= 2025–26 Sydney FC season =

Sydney FC 2025–26 Season

Sydney FC
2025–26 season
- Chairman: Jan Voss
- Head Coach: Ufuk Talay (to 24 March 2026); Patrick Kisnorbo (from 24 March 2026)
- Stadium: Leichhardt Oval (until 22 November 2025); Allianz Stadium (from 18 January 2026); Jubilee Oval (Note: Australia Cup matches only)
- A-League Men: 5th
- A-League Men finals series: Runners up
- Australia Cup: Quarter-final
- Top goalscorer: League: Tiago Quintal; Al Hassan Toure (5 goals each); All: Al Hassan Toure (6 goals)
- Highest home attendance: 33,265 vs. Western Sydney Wanderers (31 January 2026); A-League Men
- Lowest home attendance: 3,237 vs. Auckland FC (23 August 2025); Australia Cup
- Average home league attendance: 12,459
- Biggest win: 4–1 vs. Newcastle Jets (A) (1 November 2025); A-League Men; 3–0 vs. Melbourne Victory (H) (22 November 2025); A-League Men; 3–0 vs. Macarthur FC (A) (10 January 2026); A-League Men; 4–1 vs. Western Sydney Wanderers (H) (31 January 2026); A-League Men
- Biggest defeat: 0–4 vs. Melbourne Victory (A) (26 January 2026); A-League Men
Home colours	Away colours
- All statistics correct as of 23 May 2026.

The 2025–26 season is Sydney Football Club's 21st season in the A-League Men. In addition to the domestic league, Sydney will participate in this season's edition of the Australia Cup. This season covers the period from 1 July 2025 to 30 June 2026.

Sydney was forced to temporarily relocate to Leichhardt Oval, with the club scheduled to play its first four home matches at the ground, due to the clubs home ground, Allianz Stadium, undergoing repairs to its drainage system. The club later had to reschedule its final match at Leichhardt four days prior to kick-off, after a pitch inspection deemed the playing surface unsafe due to large patches of mud and sand on the pitch. Sydney played its first match at Allianz Stadium against Wellington Phoenix on 18 January 2026.

This is the first season since 2015–16 without Andrew Redmayne, who departed Sydney for the Central Coast Mariners at the end of his contact, as well as the first since 2017–18 without Anthony Caceres who departed as a free agent to Macarthur FC.

== Summary ==
=== Pre-season ===
On 18 April 2025, during the 2024–25 season, Sydney announced that Andrew Redmayne would depart at the end of his contract after eight years, leaving the club as its third-most capped player. On 7 May, Sydney announced that Patryk Klimala would be returning to Śląsk Wrocław following the conclusion of his loan deal. On 14 May, Sydney announced that manager Ufuk Talay had signed a one-year contract extension. On 16 May, the club announced that, in addition to the previously announced departures of Klimala and Redmayne; Max Burgess, Jaiden Kucharski and Jaushua Sotirio would also depart the club. On 20 May, both the Newcastle Jets and Perth Glory announced that Matthew Scarcella and Patrick Wood would be returning to Sydney after their respective loan deals ended. On 30 May, Sydney announced that midfielder Rhys Youlley had signed a three-year contract with the club, from Belgian Pro League side Westerlo. On 12 June, Sydney confirmed the signing of Akol Akon from arch-rivals' Western Sydney Wanderers NPL side. On 14 June, Sydney announced the mutual termination of Anas Ouahim's contract, as Ouahim wished to move closer to his son in Germany. On 19 June, Sydney confirmed that 2024–25 A-League Men golden boot winner Adrian Segečić would leave for Championship side Portsmouth. Four days later, Sydney announced that Anthony Caceres would also depart the club upon the expiration of his contract.

On 24 July, Sydney announced the signing of Al Hassan Toure on a two-year contract from FC Tulsa. The following day, the signing of Paul Okon-Engstler from Benfica B on a three-year deal was announced by Sydney. Following his omission from the first team squad in the Australia Cup, Sydney announced on 2 September that Léo Sena had agreed to a mutual contract termination. On 18 August, Sydney announced the signing of Congolese defender Marcel Tisserand. Between 3 and 21 September, the signings of Peruvian midfielder Piero Quispe on loan from UNAM; Spanish striker Víctor Campuzano as a free agent; Ben Garuccio and Abel Walatee who became free agents after Western United were placed into hibernation and all players were released from their contracts. On 12 September, defender Aaron Gurd went on loan to Thai League 1 side Kanchanaburi Power. Following weeks of speculation regarding his return to Sydney following the off-season, Sydney confirmed on 19 September that marquee player Douglas Costa and the club had agreed to a contract termination. Due to financial and legal matters concerning his family in Brazil, Costa was unable to leave the country and rejoin the club.

=== Australia Cup ===
Sydney's first game of the season came in the round of 32 of the 2025 Australia Cup, where they beat Western United 1–0. Mathias Macallister scored the game's only goal, in what proved to be Western United's final match before being placed into hibernation by the Australian Professional Leagues. In the round of 16, Sydney defeated NPL NSW side Sydney United 58 2–0, thanks to goals from Toure and Youlley. The match was notable for Akon's debut, as he would become the youngest ever player to play for Sydney's first team at 16 years and 81 days old. In the quarter-finals Sydney would lose to reigning A-League Men premiers Auckland FC 1–3 on penalties, after the match finished 1–1 after extra time, marking the club's first-ever defeat in a penalty shoot-out.

=== October/November ===
Sydney would start the 2025–26 A-League Men season with a 1–2 defeat away to Adelaide United on 17 October, with a goal from Joe Lolley. Sydney would bounce back the following week, with goals from Campuzano and Patrick Wood helping the club defeat the Central Coast Mariners 2–0 at Leichhardt Oval. On 1 November, a hat-trick from Toure and a goal from Wood would inspire the club to a 4–1 come from behind win over the Newcastle Jets. Sydney would continue their winning ways with a 2–0 win over Macarthur FC, thanks to Tisserand and Lolley scoring late into the second half of the match. The November international break would see three Sydney players get called up to their national teams: Okon-Engstler and Toure for Australia; and Quispe for Peru.

A brace from Lolley and a goal from Alex Grant, meant that Sydney would return from the international break with a convincing 3–0 win at home over rivals Melbourne Victory. This marked the first time since the 2020–21 season that Sydney had won four consecutive league matches, and the first time since the 2019–20 season that the club finished a match week at the top of the table. Sydney's winning run would come to an abrupt halt on 29 November, with a controversial 0–1 defeat to the Western Sydney Wanderers in the Sydney Derby.

Sydney's strong form in the opening rounds of the season would see Talay and Lolley be awarded coach and PFA player of the month respectively.

=== December ===
Sydney recorded a Central Coast Mariners 2–1 comeback win in Gosford, with Campuzano and Toure scoring on 6 December. Despite missing Lolley and Okon-Engstler due to injury, Sydney would claim a 1–0 win over Perth Glory, after a fifth minute goal from Walatee helped the Sky Blues claim all three points in Perth. Sydney would lose top spot in the league to Auckland, after a 0–2 defeat away to the Newcastle Jets on 20 December.

On 23 December, Sydney was forced to cancel its 27 December match against Auckland FC after the pitch inspection at Leichhardt Oval deemed the playing surface unsafe and in an unsatisfactory condition due to large patches of mud and sand on the pitch. Chair of the APL Stephen Conroy called the situation "unacceptable", stating that "It's simply not good enough, and our game and our fans deserve better." The match was later rescheduled to take place on 17 February 2026.

On 24 December, Sydney announced that assistant coach John Maisano would depart the club after being offered a coaching role with La Liga club Real Sociedad.

=== January ===
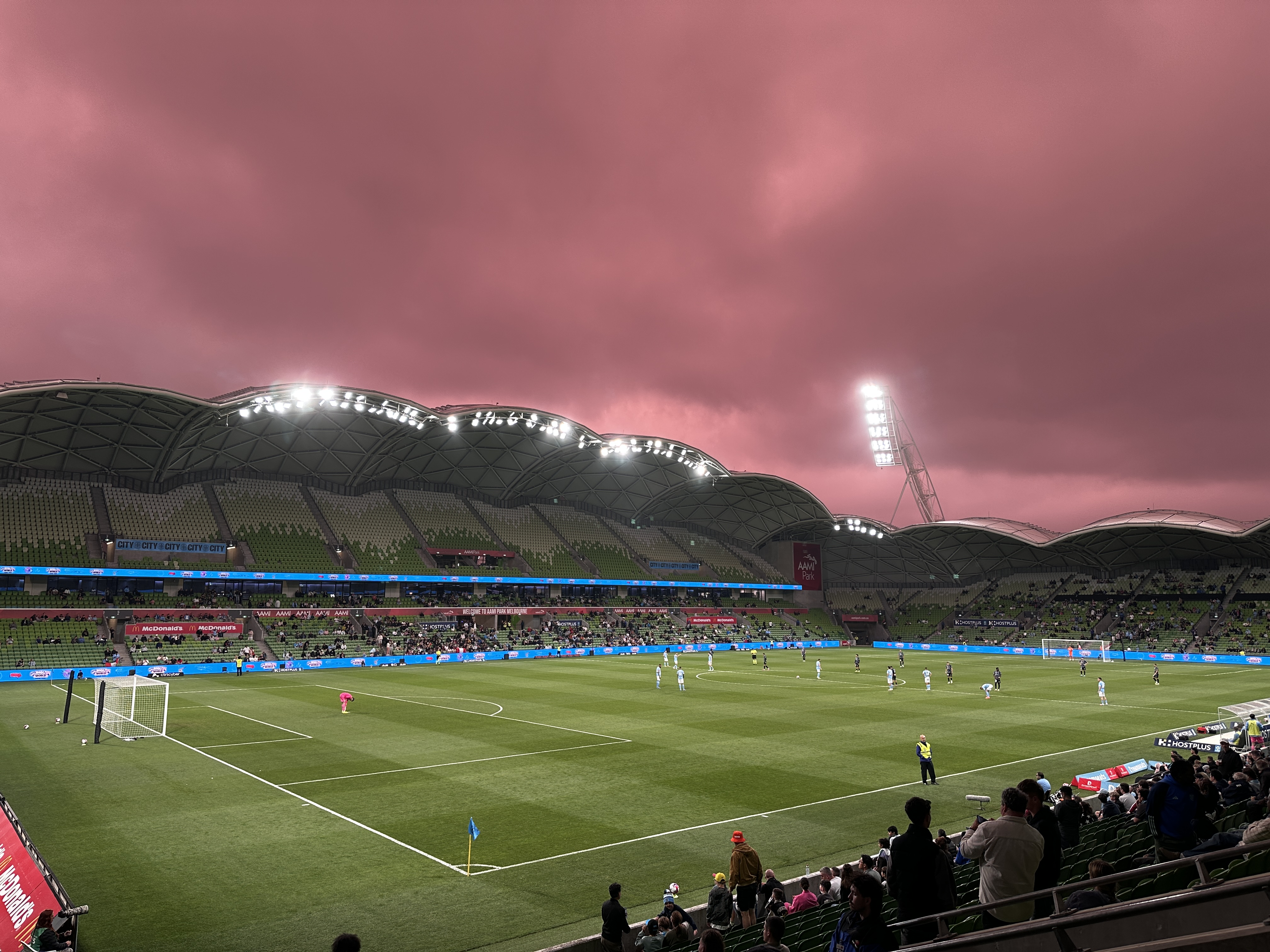
Melbourne City v Sydney FC on 3 January 2026

Sydney would start the new year with a 0–0 draw away to Melbourne City, with goalkeeper Harrison Devenish-Meares producing nine saves in the match. Sydney's performance drew criticism, after only managing 15 touches of the ball in Melbourne City's half in the second-half of the match, club legend Alex Brosque called the performance poorest display he had seen from the club since the inception of the A-League Men competition. On 10 January, Sydney bounced back in a 3–0 win over Macarthur FC, with goals coming from Quispe, Campuzano and Wood. Sydney's return to Allianz Stadium would end in disappointment, with Talay's men squandering the opportunity to return to the top of the table. Having played most of the match down a man after Youlley was sent off in the first half, the Sky Blues would lose 0–2 to the Wellington Phoenix. On 26 January, Sydney FC lost 4–0 away to Melbourne Victory, their heaviest defeat to the club since the inaugural season of the A-League Men. The club would bounce back five days later against the Western Sydney Wanderers with a 4–1 win at home, with a brace from Tiago Quintal and a hat-trick of assists from Akon helping the Sky Blues to victory.

=== February ===
On 7 February 2026, Sydney FC would lose 1–0 away to Auckland FC. On 10 February 2026, Sydney announced two deadline day signings – German midfielder Ahmet Arslan from Rot-Weiss Essen, and Australian striker Apostolos Stamatelopoulos on loan from Motherwell.

== Coaching staff ==
Position	Name
Head coach	(Australia) Patrick Kisnorbo
Assistant coach	(Australia) Matt Sim
Goalkeeping coach	(Australia) Matthew Nash

Source: Sydney FC

== Players ==
=== First-team squad ===
Note: Flags indicate national team as defined under FIFA eligibility rules; some limited exceptions apply. Players may hold more than one non-FIFA nationality.

No.	Pos.	Nation	Player
1	GK	AUS	Gus Hoefsloot
4	DF	AUS	Jordan Courtney-Perkins
5	DF	AUS	Alex Grant
6	MF	AUS	Corey Hollman (scholarship)
7	MF	PER	Piero Quispe (on loan from UNAM)
8	MF	AUS	Wataru Kamijo
9	FW	ESP	Víctor Campuzano
10	FW	ENG	Joe Lolley
11	FW	AUS	Abel Walatee
12	GK	AUS	Harrison Devenish-Meares
13	FW	AUS	Patrick Wood
16	DF	AUS	Joel King
17	DF	AUS	Ben Garuccio
19	FW	AUS	Mitchell Glasson
20	FW	AUS	Tiago Quintal
21	DF	AUS	Zac De Jesus

No.	Pos.	Nation	Player
22	FW	AUS	Mathias Macallister
23	DF	AUS	Rhyan Grant (captain)
24	MF	AUS	Paul Okon-Engstler
26	MF	AUS	Nick Alfaro (scholarship)
27	MF	AUS	Lachie Middleton
29	MF	WAL	Joe Lacey
32	DF	COD	Marcel Tisserand
33	MF	AUS	Marin France
34	DF	AUS	Tyler Williams (scholarship)
35	FW	AUS	Al Hassan Toure
36	MF	AUS	Rhys Youlley
41	DF	AUS	Alexandar Popovic
44	FW	AUS	Akol Akon (scholarship)
70	MF	GER	Ahmet Arslan
80	FW	AUS	Apostolos Stamatelopoulos (on loan from Motherwell)

== Transfers ==
=== Transfers in ===
No.	Position	Player	Transferred from	Type/fee	Contract length	Date	Ref.
44	FW	Akol Akon	Western Sydney Wanderers NPL	Free transfer	3 year scholarship	12 June 2025	
13	FW	Patrick Wood	Perth Glory	End of loan	(1 year)	1 July 2025	
18	MF	Matthew Scarcella	Newcastle Jets	End of loan		1 July 2025	
36	MF	Rhys Youlley	(Belgium) Westerlo	Free transfer	3 years	1 July 2025	
35	FW	Al Hassan Toure	(United States) FC Tulsa	Free transfer	2 years	24 July 2025	
24	MF	Paul Okon-Engstler	(Portugal) Benfica B	Free transfer	3 years	25 July 2025	
32	DF	(Democratic Republic of the Congo) Marcel Tisserand	Unattached	Free transfer	2 years	18 August 2025	
7	MF	(Peru) Piero Quispe	(Mexico) UNAM	Loan	1 year	3 September 2025	
9	FW	(Spain) Víctor Campuzano	Unattached	Free transfer	2 years	15 September 2025	
11	FW	Abel Walatee	Unattached	Free transfer	4 years	16 September 2025	
17	DF	Ben Garuccio	Unattached	Free transfer	2 years	21 September 2025	
19	FW	Mitchell Glasson	(Finland) KTP	End of loan	(6 months)	19 January 2026	
80	FW	Apostolos Stamatelopoulos	(Scotland) Motherwell	Loan	5 months	10 February 2026	
70	MF	(Germany) Ahmet Arslan	(Germany) Rot-Weiss Essen	Free transfer	5 months (Note: There is an option to extend for an additional season.)	10 February 2026	

=== From youth squad ===
N	Pos.	Nat.	Name	Age	Notes
26	MF	(Australia)	Nick Alfaro	17	3-year scholarship
34	DF	(Australia)	Tyler Williams	17	3-year scholarship
22	FW	(Australia)	Mathias Macallister	18	3-year scholarship

=== Transfers out ===
No.	Position	Player	Transferred to	Type/fee	Date	Ref.
9	FW	(Poland) Patryk Klimala	(Poland) Śląsk Wrocław	End of loan	7 May 2025	
8	MF	(Morocco) Anas Ouahim	(Bahrain) Al-Khaldiya	Mutual contract termination	14 June 2025	
1	GK	Andrew Redmayne	Central Coast Mariners	End of contract	30 June 2025	
7	FW	Adrian Segecic	(England) Portsmouth	End of contract	30 June 2025	
17	MF	Anthony Caceres	Macarthur FC	End of contract	30 June 2025	
23	MF	Max Burgess	Newcastle Jets	End of contract	30 June 2025	
25	FW	Jaiden Kucharski	Western United	End of contract	30 June 2025	
31	FW	Jaushua Sotirio	Unattached	End of contract	30 June 2025	
18	MF	Matthew Scarcella	(Norway) Hødd	End of contract	30 June 2025	
15	MF	(Brazil) Léo Sena	Unattached	Mutual contract termination	2 September 2025	
3	DF	Aaron Gurd	(Thailand) Kanchanaburi Power	Loan	12 September 2025	
37	DF	Will Kennedy	Central Coast Mariners	Mutual contract termination	17 September 2025	
11	FW	(Brazil) Douglas Costa	Unattached	Mutual contract termination	17 September 2025	

=== Contract extensions ===
No.	Position	Name	Duration	Date	Note
1	GK	Gus Hoefsloot	3 years	21 May 2025	Replaces previous scholarship contract
5	DF	Alex Grant	2 years	28 May 2025	
24	MF	Wataru Kamijo	4 years	11 June 2025	Replaces previous scholarship contract
23	DF	Rhyan Grant	1 year	5 August 2025	Contract extended from end of 2025–26 to end of 2026–27
3	DF	Aaron Gurd	1 year	12 September 2025	Contract extended from end of 2025–26 to end of 2026–27

== Kits ==
Supplier: Under Armour / Sponsor: Macquarie University

Outfield players kits

Home	Away	Australia Cup Home

Goalkeeper kits

Goalkeeper 1	Goalkeeper 2	Goalkeeper 3	Australia Cup Goalkeeper 1	Australia Cup Goalkeeper 2

== Pre-season and friendlies ==
8 July 2025	Sydney FC (Australia)	7–0	(Australia) Hakoah Sydney City	Sydney, Australia
	Wood 3' (pen.); Courtney-Perkins 13'; Youlley 50'; Macallister 70', 80', 85'; Farias 84'	Report		Stadium: Sydney Olympic Park Athletic Centre; Attendance: 0 (behind closed doors)
Note: The match was played with a 60 minute first half and a 30 minute second half.

15 July 2025	Sydney FC (Australia)	2–1	(Wales) Wrexham	Sydney, Australia
19:30 AEST	Popovic 45'; Lacey 74'	Report	Hollman 18' (o.g.)	Stadium: Allianz Stadium; Attendance: 40,242; Referee: Adam Kersey

22 July 2025	Sydney FC (Australia)	4–1	(Australia) Blacktown City	Sydney, Australia
	Lolley 7', 12'; King 44'; Youlley 66'	Report	Kriaris 84'	Stadium: Sydney Olympic Park Athletic Centre; Attendance: 0 (behind closed doors)

6 September 2025	Brisbane Roar (Australia)	0–1	(Australia) Sydney FC	Brisbane, Australia
		Report	Macallister (pen.)	Stadium: Goodwin Park; Attendance: 0 (behind closed doors)

11 September 2025	Sydney FC (Australia)	2–2	(Australia) Newcastle Jets	Sydney, Australia
	Wood; Macallister	Report	Rose; ?	Stadium: Valentine Sports Park; Attendance: 0 (behind closed doors)

26 September 2025	Sydney FC (Australia)	1–0	(New Zealand) Wellington Phoenix	Sydney, Australia
	Macallister	Report		Stadium: Leichhardt Oval; Attendance: 0 (behind closed doors)

1 October 2025	Sydney FC (Australia)	0–1	(Australia) Central Coast Mariners	Sydney, Australia
		Report	Edmondson 29'	Stadium: Leichhardt Oval; Attendance: 0 (behind closed doors)

7 October 2025	Sydney FC (Australia)	3–1	(Australia) Perth Glory	Sydney, Australia
	Campuzano 36', 52'; Macallister 84'	Report	Taggart 33'	Stadium: Sydney Olympic Park Athletic Centre; Attendance: 0 (behind closed doors)

== Competitions ==
=== Overall record ===
Competition	First match	Last match	Starting round	Final position	Record							
Competition	First match	Last match	Starting round	Final position	Pld	W	D	L	GF	GA	GD	Win %
A-League Men	17 October 2025	26 April 2026	Matchday 1	5th	26	11	6	9	33	25	+8	42.31
A-League Men Finals	2 May 2026	23 May 2026	Elimination final		4	1	2	1	3	3	+0	25.00
Australia Cup	29 July 2025	23 August 2025	Round of 32	Quarter-final	3	2	1	0	4	1	+3	66.67
Total					33	14	9	10	40	29	+11	42.42

Last updated: 23 May 2026
Source: Competitions

=== A-League Men ===
==== League table ====
Pos	Team	Pld	W	D	L	GF	GA	GD	Pts	Qualification
3	Auckland FC (Note: Auckland FC and Wellington Phoenix cannot qualify for Asian Football Confederation competitions as they are based in New Zealand, which is part of the Oceania Football Confederation.) (C)	26	11	9	6	42	29	+13	42	Qualification for the finals series (Note: The top two teams enter the finals series at the semi-finals, while the teams ranked third to sixth enter the finals series at the elimination-finals.)
4	Melbourne Victory	26	11	7	8	44	33	+11	40	Qualification for the AFC Champions League Two group stage and the finals series (Note: Since the 2025 Australia Cup winners, Newcastle Jets, occupy an AFC Champions League Elite position, the AFC Champions League Two spot goes to the next eligible team. The AFC ruled that the Australia Cup runner-up Heidelberg United was ineligible to compete.)
5	Sydney FC	26	11	6	9	33	25	+8	39	Qualification for the finals series
6	Melbourne City	26	10	8	8	33	33	0	38	Qualification for the finals series
7	Macarthur FC	26	9	7	10	37	44	−7	34	

Source: A-Leagues
Rules for classification: 1) points; 2) goal difference; 3) goals scored; 4) wins; 5) head-to-head results; 5a) head-to-head points; 5b) head-to-head goal difference; 6) Fair Play points; 7) away goal difference; 8) away goals per match; 9) home goal difference; 10) home goals per match; 11) toss of a coin in an event of a tie of two clubs.
(C) Champions

==== Results summary ====
Overall								Home						Away					
Pld	W	D	L	GF	GA	GD	Pts	W	D	L	GF	GA	GD	W	D	L	GF	GA	GD
26	11	6	9	33	25	+8	39	5	4	4	19	13	+6	6	2	5	14	12	+2

Source: Ultimate A-League

==== Results by round ====
Round	1	2	3	4	5	6	7	8	9	11	12	13	14	15	16	17	10	18	19	20	21	22	23	24	25	26
Ground	A	H	A	H	H	A	A	A	A	H	A	A	H	A	H	A	H	H	A	H	H	H	A	A	H	H
Result	L	W	W	W	W	L	W	W	L	D	W	L	L	W	L	L	D	W	W	D	L	L	D	W	D	D
Position	11	5	2	2	1	1	1	1	2	2	2	2	4	2	3	4	3	3	3	3	3	5	5	3	4	5
Points	0	3	6	9	12	12	15	18	18	19	22	22	22	25	25	25	26	29	32	33	33	33	34	37	38	39

Source: Ultimate A-League
A = Away; H = Home; W = Win; D = Draw; L = Loss

==== Matches ====
The league fixtures were announced on 11 September 2025.

Win Draw Loss Fixtures

17 October 2025 1	Adelaide United	2–1	Sydney FC	Adelaide
18:35 ACDT	Kitto 55'; Alagich 65'	Report	Lolley 90+1'	Stadium: Coopers Stadium; Attendance: 11,708; Referee: Alireza Faghani

25 October 2025 2	Sydney FC	2–0	Central Coast Mariners	Sydney
19:35 AEDT	Campuzano 58'; Wood 90'	Report		Stadium: Leichhardt Oval; Attendance: 10,700; Referee: Ben Abraham

1 November 2025 3	Newcastle Jets	1–4	Sydney FC	Newcastle
17:00 AEDT	Gibson 8'	Report	Toure 11', 51', 58'; Wood 74'	Stadium: McDonald Jones Stadium; Attendance: 7,815; Referee: Shane Skinner

9 November 2025 4	Sydney FC	2–0	Macarthur FC	Sydney
15:00 AEDT	Tisserand 76'; Lolley 90+3'	Report		Stadium: Leichhardt Oval; Attendance: 10,817; Referee: Daniel Elder

22 November 2025 5	Sydney FC	3–0	Melbourne Victory	Sydney
19:35 AEDT	Lolley 58', 70'; A. Grant 76'	Report		Stadium: Leichhardt Oval; Attendance: 10,916; Referee: Alex King

29 November 2025 6	Western Sydney Wanderers	1–0	Sydney FC	Sydney
19:35 AEDT	Kuol 51'	Report		Stadium: CommBank Stadium; Attendance: 21,258; Referee: Alex King

6 December 2025 7	Central Coast Mariners	1–2	Sydney FC	Gosford
20:30 AEDT	Tapp 10'	Report	Toure 29'; Campuzano 68'	Stadium: Polytech Stadium; Attendance: 3,571; Referee: Ben Abraham
Note: The match was originally scheduled for 19:35, but was delayed to 20:30 due to adverse weather conditions.

13 December 2025 8	Perth Glory	0–1	Sydney FC	Perth
17:35 AWST		Report	Walatee 5'	Stadium: HBF Park; Attendance: 6,689; Referee: Lachlan Keevers

20 December 2025 9	Newcastle Jets	2–0	Sydney FC	Newcastle
17:00 AEDT	Dobson 66'; Bertoncello 84'	Report		Stadium: McDonald Jones Stadium; Attendance: 5,587; Referee: Lachlan Keevers

3 January 2026 11	Melbourne City	0–0	Sydney FC	Melbourne
19:35 AEDT		Report		Stadium: AAMI Park; Attendance: 5,035; Referee: Shaun Evans
Note: Due to the availability of Allianz Stadium, the hosting of rounds 11 and 21 were switched and the dates changed.

10 January 2026 12	Macarthur FC	0–3	Sydney FC	Sydney
19:35 AEDT		Report	Quispe 31'; Campuzano 48'; Wood 62'	Stadium: Campbelltown Sports Stadium; Attendance: 6,023; Referee: Shaun Evans

18 January 2026 13	Sydney FC	0–2	Wellington Phoenix	Sydney
17:00 AEDT		Report	Armiento 29'; Hughes 63'	Stadium: Allianz Stadium; Attendance: 13,678; Referee: Sam Kelly

26 January 2026 14	Melbourne Victory	4–0	Sydney FC	Melbourne
17:30 AEDT	Santos 53', 64'; Jelacic 79'; Jackson 82'	Report		Stadium: AAMI Park; Attendance: 14,816; Referee: Daniel Elder

31 January 2026 15	Sydney FC	4–1	Western Sydney Wanderers	Sydney
19:35 AEDT	Campuzano 10'; Tisserand 49'; Quintal 55', 68'	Report	Fraser 1'	Stadium: Allianz Stadium; Attendance: 33,265; Referee: Adam Kersey

7 February 2026 16	Auckland FC	1–0	Sydney FC	Auckland
15:00 NZDT	Cosgrove 20'	Report		Stadium: Go Media Stadium; Attendance: 13,050; Referee: Alex King

14 February 2026 17	Sydney FC	1–2	Adelaide United	Sydney
19:35 AEDT	Quintal 14'	Report	Kitto 18'; Jovanovic 87'	Stadium: Allianz Stadium; Attendance: 8,816; Referee: Ben Abraham

17 February 2026 10	Sydney FC	1–1	Auckland FC	Sydney
19:00 AEDT	Popovic 84'	Report	Grant 90+5' (o.g.)	Stadium: Leichhardt Oval; Attendance: 6,471; Referee: Daniel Elder
Note: The game was postponed from 27 December 2025, due to the Leichhardt Oval pitch not being ready to accommodate games.

21 February 2026 18	Sydney FC	1–0	Brisbane Roar	Sydney
17:00 AEDT	Quintal 54'	Report		Stadium: Allianz Stadium; Attendance: 10,087; Referee: Alex King

1 March 2026 19	Wellington Phoenix	0–1	Sydney FC	Wellington
13:00 NZDT		Report	Popovic 49'	Stadium: Hnry Stadium; Attendance: 4,322; Referee: Tim Danaskos

7 March 2026 20	Sydney FC	2–2	Melbourne Victory	Sydney
19:35 AEDT	Stamatelopoulos 73'; Arslan 75'	Report	Mata 34'; Nduka 69'	Stadium: Allianz Stadium; Attendance: 15,071; Referee: Lachlan Keevers

17 March 2026 21	Sydney FC	0–1	Melbourne City	Sydney
19:00 AEDT		Report	Caputo 54'	Stadium: Allianz Stadium; Attendance: 5,115; Referee: Daniel Elder
Note: Due to the availability of Allianz Stadium, the hosting of rounds 11 and 21 were switched and the dates changed.

22 March 2026 22	Sydney FC	1–2	Newcastle Jets	Sydney
15:00 AEDT	Quintal 68'	Report	Mizunuma 32'; Gibson 90+3'	Stadium: Allianz Stadium; Attendance: 10,159; Referee: Adam Kersey

2 April 2026 23	Brisbane Roar	0–0	Sydney FC	Brisbane
20:00 AEST		Report		Stadium: Suncorp Stadium; Attendance: 5,648; Referee: Alireza Faghani

11 April 2026 24	Western Sydney Wanderers	0–2	Sydney FC	Sydney
19:35 AEST		Report	Toure 20'; Stamatelopoulos 83'	Stadium: CommBank Stadium; Attendance: 16,135; Referee: Daniel Elder

18 April 2026 25	Sydney FC	0–0	Perth Glory	Sydney
19:35 AEST		Report		Stadium: Allianz Stadium; Attendance: 10,212; Referee: Eric Saba

26 April 2026 26	Sydney FC	2–2	Auckland FC	Sydney
15:00 AEST	Garuccio 56'; Popovic 85'	Report	May 67', 90'	Stadium: Allianz Stadium; Attendance: 16,661; Referee: Ben Abraham

==== Finals series ====
2 May 2026 Elimination final	Melbourne Victory	0–1	Sydney FC	Melbourne
19:40 AEST		Report	Wood 80'	Stadium: AAMI Park; Attendance: 15,258; Referee: Lachlan Keevers

9 May 2026 Semi-finals first leg	Sydney FC	1–1	Newcastle Jets	Sydney
19:40 AEST	Stamatelopoulos 50'	Report	Adams 58'	Stadium: Allianz Stadium; Attendance: 17,771; Referee: Daniel Elder

16 May 2026 Semi-finals second leg	Newcastle Jets	1–1 (a.e.t.) (2–2 agg.) (2–4 p)	Sydney FC	Newcastle
19:40 AEST	Adams 90+5'	Report	Quispe 63'	Stadium: McDonald Jones Stadium; Attendance: 25,082; Referee: Shaun Evans
	Penalties
	Grozos (penalty missed); Mizunuma (penalty scored); Gibson (penalty scored); Bertoncello (penalty missed)		(penalty missed) Lolley; (penalty scored) Youlley; (penalty scored) Campuzano; (penalty scored) R. Grant; (penalty scored) Garuccio

23 May 2026 Grand Final	Auckland FC	1–0	Sydney FC	Auckland
20:10 NZST	Howieson 60'	Report		Stadium: Go Media Stadium; Attendance: 28,374; Referee: Alex King

=== Australia Cup ===
29 July 2025 Round of 32	Western United	0–1	Sydney FC	Tarneit
19:30 AEST		Report	Macallister 75'	Stadium: Ironbark Fields; Attendance: 1,347; Referee: Jack Morgan

10 August 2025 Round of 16	Sydney United 58	0–2	Sydney FC	Sydney
15:00 AEST		Report	Toure 11'; Youlley 88'	Stadium: Sydney United Sports Centre; Attendance: 4,000; Referee: Thomas Dale

23 August 2025 Quarter-final	Sydney FC	1–1 (a.e.t.) (1–3 p)	Auckland FC	Sydney
19:30 AEST	Lolley 87'	Report	Brook 85'	Stadium: Jubilee Stadium; Attendance: 3,237; Referee: Casey Reibelt
	Penalties
	Grant (penalty scored); King (penalty missed); Macallister (penalty missed); Lolley (penalty missed)		(penalty scored) Cosgrove; (penalty missed) May; (penalty scored) de Vries; (penalty scored) Brimmer

== Statistics ==
=== Appearances and goals ===
Includes all competitions. Players with no appearances not included in the list.

As of match played 23 May 2026

No.	Pos	Nat	Player	Total		A-League Men		A-League Men Finals series		Australia Cup	
No.	Pos	Nat	Player	Apps	Goals	Apps	Goals	Apps	Goals	Apps	Goals
Goalkeepers
1	GK	(Australia) AUS	Gus Hoefsloot	3	0	0	0	0	0	3	0
12	GK	(Australia) AUS	Harrison Devenish-Meares	30	0	26	0	4	0	0	0
Defenders
4	DF	(Australia) AUS	Jordan Courtney-Perkins	16	0	4+6	0	4	0	2	0
5	DF	(Australia) AUS	Alex Grant	24	1	21+1	1	0	0	1+1	0
16	DF	(Australia) AUS	Joel King	12	0	7+2	0	0	0	3	0
17	DF	(Australia) AUS	Ben Garuccio	24	1	19+1	1	4	0	0	0
21	DF	(Australia) AUS	Zac De Jesus	1	0	0+1	0	0	0	0	0
23	DF	(Australia) AUS	Rhyan Grant	33	0	26	0	4	0	3	0
32	DF	(Democratic Republic of the Congo) COD	Marcel Tisserand	19	2	18+1	2	0	0	0	0
41	DF	(Australia) AUS	Alexandar Popovic	25	3	10+8	3	4	0	3	0
Midfielders
6	MF	(Australia) AUS	Corey Hollman	13	0	5+5	0	0	0	2+1	0
7	MF	(Peru) PER	Piero Quispe	30	2	24+2	1	4	1	0	0
8	MF	(Australia) AUS	Wataru Kamijo	17	0	4+7	0	4	0	1+1	0
24	MF	(Australia) AUS	Paul Okon-Engstler	30	0	22+1	0	4	0	3	0
26	MF	(Australia) AUS	Nickolas Alfaro	1	0	0+1	0	0	0	0	0
29	MF	(Wales) WAL	Joe Lacey	2	0	0+1	0	0	0	0+1	0
33	MF	(Australia) AUS	Marin France	1	0	0+1	0	0	0	0	0
36	MF	(Australia) AUS	Rhys Youlley	25	1	13+6	0	0+3	0	3	1
70	MF	(Germany) GER	Ahmet Arslan	15	1	10+1	1	0+4	0	0	0
Forwards
9	FW	(Spain) ESP	Víctor Campuzano	26	4	20+3	4	0+3	0	0	0
10	FW	(England) ENG	Joe Lolley	20	5	11+3	4	0+3	0	3	1
11	FW	(Australia) AUS	Abel Walatee	14	1	3+11	1	0	0	0	0
13	FW	(Australia) AUS	Patrick Wood	26	4	3+16	3	0+4	1	3	0
20	FW	(Australia) AUS	Tiago Quintal	31	5	15+9	5	4	0	1+2	0
22	FW	(Australia) AUS	Mathias Macallister	7	1	0+4	0	0	0	0+3	1
35	FW	(Australia) AUS	Al Hassan Toure	22	6	14+6	5	0	0	1+1	1
44	FW	(Australia) AUS	Akol Akon	17	0	2+9	0	4	0	1+1	0
80	FW	(Australia) AUS	Apostolos Stamatelopoulos	14	4	9+1	3	4	1	0	0

=== Disciplinary record ===
Includes all competitions. The list is sorted by squad number when total cards are equal. Players with no cards not included in the list.

As of match played 23 May 2026

Rank	No.	Pos.	Nat.	Name	A-League Men			A-League Men Finals Series			Australia Cup			Total		
Rank	No.	Pos.	Nat.	Name	Booked	(yellow card) (yellow-red card)	Sent off (straight red)	Booked	(yellow card) (yellow-red card)	Sent off (straight red)	Booked	(yellow card) (yellow-red card)	Sent off (straight red)	Booked	(yellow card) (yellow-red card)	Sent off (straight red)
1	36	MF	(Australia)	Rhys Youlley	2	0	1	0	0	0	0	0	0	2	0	1
2	24	MF	(Australia)	Paul Okon-Engstler	6	0	0	3	0	0	0	0	0	9	0	0
3	23	DF	(Australia)	Rhyan Grant	5	0	0	0	0	0	1	0	0	6	0	0
4	5	DF	(Australia)	Alex Grant	4	0	0	0	0	0	1	0	0	5	0	0
5	7	MF	(Peru)	Piero Quispe	3	0	0	1	0	0	0	0	0	4	0	0
5	9	FW	(Spain)	Víctor Campuzano	3	0	0	1	0	0	0	0	0	4	0	0
5	13	FW	(Australia)	Patrick Wood	2	0	0	2	0	0	0	0	0	4	0	0
8	8	MF	(Australia)	Wataru Kamijo	1	0	0	1	0	0	1	0	0	3	0	0
8	16	DF	(Australia)	Joel King	2	0	0	0	0	0	1	0	0	3	0	0
8	20	MF	(Australia)	Tiago Quintal	3	0	0	0	0	0	0	0	0	3	0	0
8	32	DF	(Democratic Republic of the Congo)	Marcel Tisserand	3	0	0	0	0	0	0	0	0	3	0	0
8	44	FW	(Australia)	Akol Akon	1	0	0	0	0	0	2	0	0	3	0	0
8	70	MF	(Germany)	Ahmet Arslan	1	0	0	2	0	0	0	0	0	3	0	0
14	4	DF	(Australia)	Jordan Courtney-Perkins	2	0	0	0	0	0	0	0	0	2	0	0
14	12	GK	(Australia)	Harrison Devenish-Meares	2	0	0	0	0	0	0	0	0	2	0	0
14	17	DF	(Australia)	Ben Garuccio	2	0	0	0	0	0	0	0	0	2	0	0
14	41	DF	(Australia)	Alexander Popovic	2	0	0	0	0	0	0	0	0	2	0	0
18	4	DF	(Australia)	Jordan Courtney-Perkins	1	0	0	0	0	0	0	0	0	1	0	0
18	35	FW	(Australia)	Al Hassan Toure	1	0	0	0	0	0	0	0	0	1	0	0
Total					45	0	1	10	0	0	6	0	0	61	0	1

=== Hat-tricks ===
Player	Against	Result	Date	Competition	Ref.
(Australia) Al Hassan Toure	Newcastle Jets (A)	4–1	1 November 2024	A-League Men	

=== Clean sheets ===
Includes all competitions. The list is sorted by squad number when total clean sheets are equal. Numbers in parentheses represent games where both goalkeepers participated and both kept a clean sheet; the number in parentheses is awarded to the goalkeeper who was substituted on, whilst a full clean sheet is awarded to the goalkeeper who was on the field at the start of play. Goalkeepers with no clean sheets not included in the list.

As of match played 23 May 2026

Rank	No.	Nat.	Goalkeeper	A-League Men	A-League Men finals series	Australia Cup	Total
1	12	(Australia)	Harrison Devenish-Meares	11	1	0	12
2	1	(Australia)	Gus Hoefsloot	0	0	2	2
Total				11	1	2	14

== See also ==
- 2025–26 Sydney FC (women) season
