= 2026 A-League Men Grand Final =

2025 edition of the A-League Men Grand Final

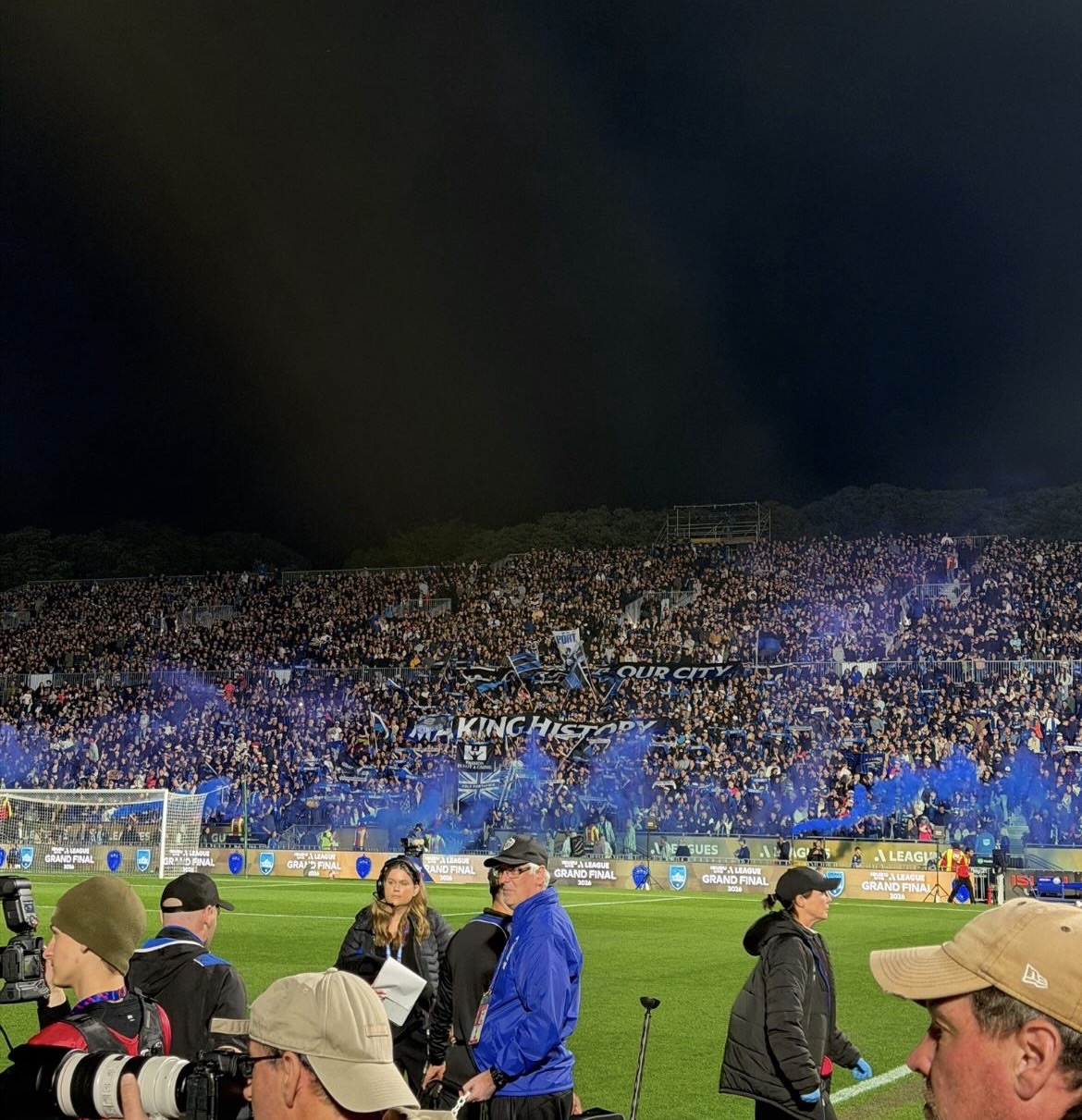
- The match was held at Go Media Stadium
- Event: 2025–26 A-League Men
Auckland	Sydney
1	0
- Date: 23 May 2026
- Venue: Go Media Stadium, Auckland
- Joe Marston Medal: Cameron Howieson (Auckland)
- Referee: Alex King (Queensland)
- Attendance: 28,374

The 2026 A-League Men Grand Final, known officially as the Isuzu UTE A-League Grand Final, was a soccer match played between Auckland and Sydney on 23 May 2026 at Go Media Stadium in Auckland, New Zealand.

== Background ==
The Game would be Auckland's first Grand Final since being established in 2024. Auckland would achieve this in its second season in the A-League season where they would be knocked out by Melbourne Victory 2–1 in the 2025 A-League Finals series. In the 2026 Finals series Auckland played Melbourne City after penalties in the elimination finals and Adelaide United 4–1 in the Semi Final. Previously Auckland also won the A-League Premiership in the 2024-25 season.

For Sydney FC it would be there first time in the grand final since 2021 where they lost 3–1 against Melbourne City. This will be Sydney's eighth Grand Final in the club's history, with their last championship coming in 2020 against the Melbourne City and last trophy being the 2023 Australia Cup. This would be coach Patrick Kisnorbo's 8th match after being appointed Sydney coach in March of 2026.

=== Previous finals ===
In the following table, finals until 2004 were in the National Soccer League era, since 2006 were in the A-League Men era.

Team	Previous grand final appearances (bold indicates winners)
Auckland	None
Sydney	7 (**2006**, **2010**, 2015, **2017**, **2019**, **2020**, 2021)

== Road to the final ==
Following the regular season, a four-week Finals Series was played to determine the winner of the A-League Championship. The top two highest-placed teams were given a bye into the semi-finals, while third to sixth were drawn into the elimination finals; both third and fourth hosted against the sixth and fifth-placed sides respectively. The winners progressed to a two-legged semi-final, first introduced in the 2021–22 season, with the first leg played at the home stadium of the lowest-ranked club. Both legs' results were put into an aggregate score to decide the winners, which would face each other in the Grand Final. Should the aggregate scores were level, the second match would go into extra time, and then to a penalty shoot-out should the score remained level. The away goals rule was not used in the semi-finals. The finalists who placed higher on the table would host the Grand Final.

Auckland FC				Round	Sydney FC			
2025–26 A-League Men; 2nd place: Pos / Team / Pld / Pts; 1 / Newcastle Jets / 26 / 48; 2 / Adelaide United / 26 / 43; 3 / Auckland FC (C) / 26 / 42; 4 / Melbourne Victory / 26 / 40; 5 / Sydney FC / 26 / 39; Source: A-Leagues (C) Champions				Regular season	2025–26 A-League Men; 5th place: Pos / Team / Pld / Pts; 3 / Auckland FC (C) / 26 / 42; 4 / Melbourne Victory / 26 / 40; 5 / Sydney FC / 26 / 39; 6 / Melbourne City / 26 / 38; 7 / Macarthur FC / 26 / 34; Source: A-Leagues (C) Champions			
Opponent	Score			Elimination-finals	Opponent	Score		
Melbourne City	1–1 (a.e.t.) (7–6 p) (H)			Elimination-finals	Melbourne Victory	0–1 (A)		
Opponent	Agg.	1st leg	2nd leg	Semi-finals	Opponent	Agg.	1st leg	2nd leg
Adelaide United	4–1	1–1 (H)	3–0 (A)	Semi-finals	Newcastle Jets	2–2 (4–2 p)	1–1 (H)	1–1 (a.e.t.) (A)

== Prematch ==
=== Venue ===
The Grand Final was held at Go Media Stadium, Auckland, New Zealand, the home ground of Auckland FC. It was the first Grand Final hosted at the venue. This was the first A-League Grand Final to be hosted in New Zealand.

=== Ticketing ===
Tickets went on sale for the match on 18 May, with member pre-sale tickets being sold at 7am and public sales beginning at 2pm. The match officially sold out three days later on 21 May.

=== Broadcasting ===
The match was broadcast on Network 10 and Paramount+ for Australian viewers, Sky Sport for New Zealand viewers, and YouTube for some international viewers. Although the regular season was broadcast on ESPN3 for viewers in the United States, neither the finals series nor the Grand Final were broadcast in the United States, with coverage unavailable on both ESPN and YouTube.

=== Officiating ===
After winning his third referee of the year award, Alex King would be announced to be the referee in this game. this would be Kings third time as referee in the A-League Grand Final.

Kearney Robinson and Daniel Ilievski were named as assistant referees. The fourth official duties were given to Daniel Elder, with Shaun Evans being named the video assistant referee, along with Kate Jacewicz as assistant VAR and Sam Kelly taking the role of Offside Support Official.

=== Team selection ===
Squads of both clubs for the match were named on 21 May. Coming into Auckland's squad was only Felipe Gallegos while they had Oli Sail, Guillermo May, and Marlee Francois were out due to injuries. Sydney FC saw no unavailability's in the squad while Al-Hassan Toure returned from injury and Corey Hollman would be promoted into the senior squad.

== Match ==
23 May 2026
20:10 NZST

Auckland FC	1–0	Sydney FC
Howieson 60'	Report

Go Media Stadium, Auckland
Attendance: 28,374
Referee: Alex King

Auckland FC	Sydney FC

GK	1	(New Zealand) Michael Woud
RB	2	(Japan) Hiroki Sakai (c)
CB	3	(Australia) Jake Girdwood-Reich
CB	23	(Fiji) Dan Hall	(yellow card) 56'
CB	4	(New Zealand) Nando Pijnaker	(yellow card) 31'
LB	17	(New Zealand) Callan Elliot	(yellow card) 58'	(substituted off) 72'
RM	7	(New Zealand) Cameron Howieson
CM	6	(Belgium) Louis Verstraete	(yellow card) 53'
LM	21	(New Zealand) Jesse Randall		(substituted off) 90'
RF	77	(Australia) Lachlan Brook		(substituted off) 72'
LF	9	(England) Sam Cosgrove	(yellow card) 56'
Substitutes:
GK	12	(Australia) James Hilton
DF	15	(New Zealand) Francis de Vries		(substituted on) 72'
DF	52	(New Zealand) Luka Vicelich
MF	8	(Chile) Felipe Gallegos
MF	57	(New Zealand) Van Fitzharris
FW	14	(New Zealand) Liam Gillion		(substituted on) 90'
FW	27	(New Zealand) Logan Rogerson		(substituted on) 72'
Manager:
(Australia) Steve Corica

GK	12	(Australia) Harrison Devenish-Meares
RB	23	(Australia) Rhyan Grant (c)
CB	41	(Australia) Alexandar Popovic
CB	4	(Australia) Jordan Courtney-Perkins
LB	17	(Australia) Ben Garuccio
DM	8	(Australia) Wataru Kamijo		(substituted off) 84'
DM	24	(Australia) Paul Okon-Engstler
RM	44	(Australia) Akol Akon		(substituted off) 64'
CM	20	(Australia) Tiago Quintal		(substituted off) 72'
LM	7	(Peru) Piero Quispe		(substituted off) 71'
CF	80	(Australia) Apostolos Stamatelopoulos		(substituted off) 84'
Substitutes:
GK	1	(Australia) Gus Hoefsloot
DF	16	(Australia) Joel King
MF	36	(Australia) Rhys Youlley		(substituted on) 72'
MF	70	(Germany) Ahmet Arslan		(substituted on) 84'
FW	9	(Spain) Víctor Campuzano	(yellow card) 76'	(substituted on) 71'
FW	10	(England) Joe Lolley		(substituted on) 64'
FW	13	(Australia) Patrick Wood		(substituted on) 84'
Manager:
(Australia) Patrick Kisnorbo

Man of the Match (Joe Marston Medal):
Cameron Howieson (Auckland FC)

Assistant referees:
Kearney Robinson (New South Wales)
Daniel Ilievski (Victoria)
Fourth official:
Daniel Elder (South Australia)
Reserve assistant referee:
Bradley Wright (New South Wales)
Video assistant referee:
Shaun Evans (Victoria)
Assistant video assistant referees:
Kate Jacewicz (Victoria)
Sam Kelly (New South Wales)

Match rules

- 90 minutes.
- 30 minutes of extra time if necessary.
- Penalty shoot-out if scores still level.
- Seven named substitutes.
- Maximum of five substitutions, with a sixth allowed in extra time. (Note: Each team is given only three opportunities to make substitutions, with a fourth opportunity in extra time, excluding substitutions made at half-time, before the start of extra time and at half-time in extra time.)
