= List of Auckland FC seasons =

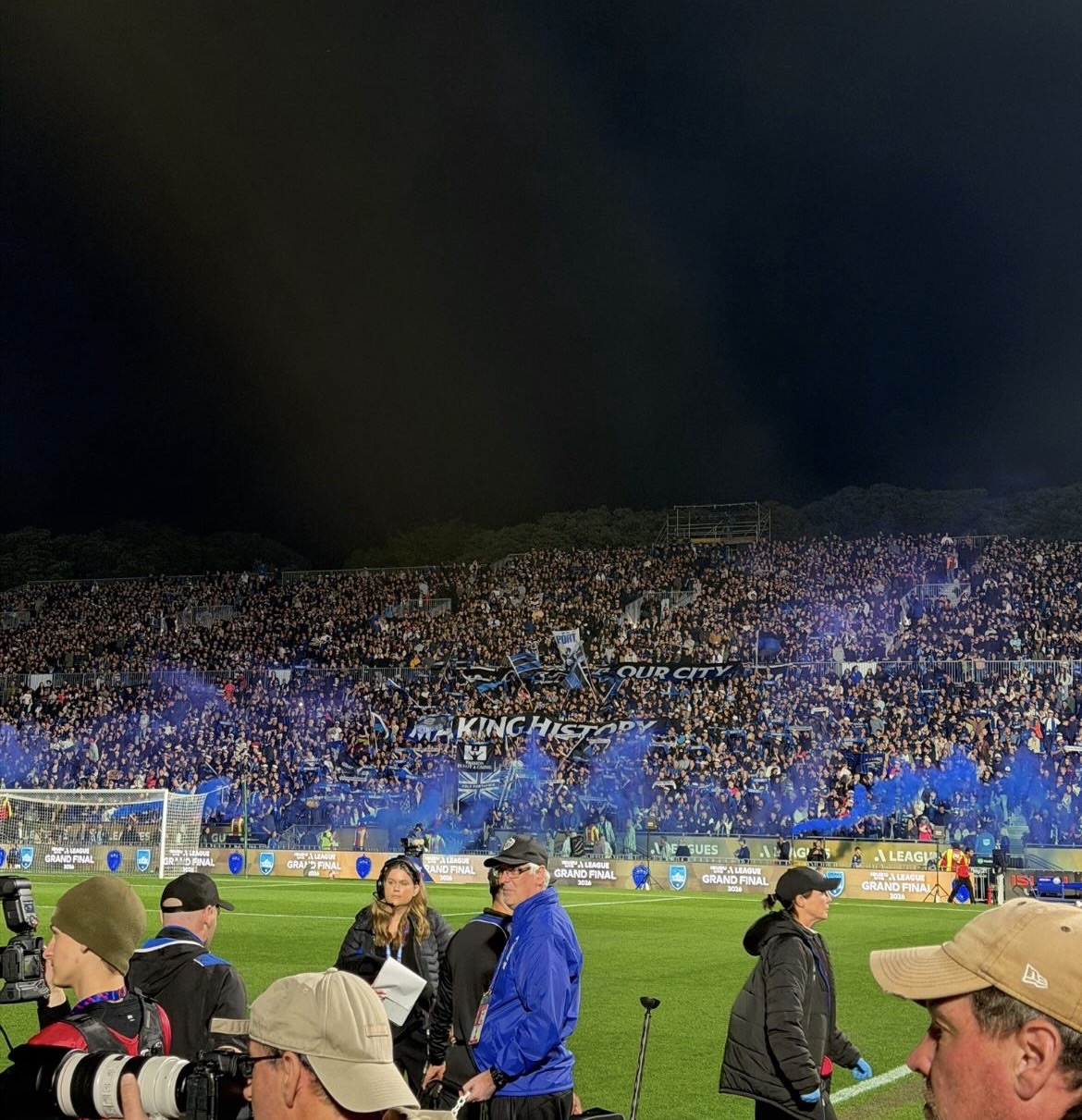
Auckland FC fans at the 2026 A-League Grand Final

This is a list of all seasons played by Auckland Football Club in Australian soccer, from their inaugural season in 2024–25. It details their record in every major competition entered, as well as the top goalscorers for each season. Top scorers in bold were also the top scorers in Auckland FC's division that season.

Auckland FC, is a New Zealand professional association football club based in Penrose, Auckland. The club was founded in March 2024 competing in the A-League Men. The club has won one A-League Premiership, as well as one A-League Championship.

== Key ==
Key to league competitions:

- A-League Men

Key to colours and symbols:

1st or W	Winners
2nd or RU	Runners-up
3rd	Third place
♦	Top scorer in division

Key to league record:

- Season = The year and article of the season
- Pos = Final position
- Pld = Matches played
- W = Matches won
- D = Matches drawn
- L = Matches lost
- GF = Goals scored
- GA = Goals against
- Pts = Points

Key to cup record:

- En-dash (–) = Auckland FC did not participate or cup not held
- R1 = First round
- R2 = Second round, etc.
- R32 = Round of 32
- R16 = Round of 16
- QF = Quarter-finals
- EF = Elimination-finals
- SF = Semi-finals
- RU = Runners-up
- W = Winners

== Seasons ==
Results of league and cup competitions by season
Season	League									Finals	Australia Cup	Top goalscorer(s) (Note: Competitive matches only. Includes all goals scored in the A-League Men, A-League Men Finals, and Australia Cup.)	
Season	Division	Pld	W	D	L	GF	GA	Pts	Pos	Finals	Australia Cup	Player(s)	Goals
2024–25	A-League Men	26	15	8	3	49	27	53	**1st**	SF	—N/a	(Uruguay) Guillermo May (New Zealand) Logan Rogerson	9
2025–26	A-League Men	26	11	9	6	42	29	42	3rd	**W**	SF	(England) Sam Cosgrove ♦ (Note: 11 goals in the A-League Men)	12
2025–26	A-League Men	26	11	9	6	42	29	42	3rd	**W**	SF	(New Zealand) Jesse Randall	12
