= 2026 A-League Men finals series =

A-League Men finals series
- Season: 2025–26
- Dates: 1–23 May 2026
- Champions: Auckland FC
- Runner up: Sydney FC
- Matches: 7
- Goals: 13 (1.86 per match)
- Top goalscorer: Eli Adams (2 goals)
- Biggest home win: Auckland FC 1–0 Sydney FC (23 May 2026)
- Biggest away win: Adelaide United 0–3 Auckland FC (15 May 2026)
- Highest scoring: Adelaide United 0–3 Auckland FC (15 May 2026)
- Highest attendance: 28,374; Auckland FC 1–0 Sydney FC (23 May 2026)
- Lowest attendance: 11,351; Auckland FC 1–1 Melbourne City (2 May 2026)
- Total attendance: 128,915
- Average attendance: 18,416

The 2026 A-League Men finals series was the 21st annual edition of A-League finals series, the playoffs tournament staged to determine the champions of the 2025–26 A-League Men season. The series was played over four weeks culminating in the 2026 A-League Men Grand Final.

== Qualification ==
The top two teams; Newcastle Jets and Adelaide United, qualify directly for the semi-finals. The teams placed third through to sixth play in the elimination-finals, with the third and fourth placed teams; Auckland FC and Melbourne Victory , hosting the matches. All teams qualified in round 25 with Newcastle claiming the premiership. This would be the Jets first finals appearance since the 2018 A-League finals Series. The rest of the teams would finalise their places in round 26 of the regular season. Among the teams who made it too the finals series Melbourne Victory and Sydney FC would both qualify for their 15th Finals series appearance.

Pos	Team	Pld	W	D	L	GF	GA	GD	Pts	Qualification
1	Newcastle Jets	26	15	3	8	55	39	+16	48	Qualification for the AFC Champions League Elite league stage and the finals series (Note: The top two teams enter the finals series at the semi-finals, while the teams ranked third to sixth enter the finals series at the elimination-finals.)
2	Adelaide United	26	12	7	7	46	36	+10	43	Qualification for the AFC Champions League Elite preliminary stage and the finals series
3	Auckland FC (Note: Auckland FC and Wellington Phoenix cannot qualify for Asian Football Confederation competitions as they are based in New Zealand, which is part of the Oceania Football Confederation.) (C)	26	11	9	6	42	29	+13	42	Qualification for the finals series
4	Melbourne Victory	26	11	7	8	44	33	+11	40	Qualification for the AFC Champions League Two group stage and the finals series (Note: Since the 2025 Australia Cup winners, Newcastle Jets, occupy an AFC Champions League Elite position, the AFC Champions League Two spot goes to the next eligible team. The AFC ruled that the Australia Cup runner-up Heidelberg United was ineligible to compete.)
5	Sydney FC	26	11	6	9	33	25	+8	39	Qualification for the finals series
6	Melbourne City	26	10	8	8	33	33	0	38	Qualification for the finals series
7	Macarthur FC	26	9	7	10	37	44	−7	34	
8	Wellington Phoenix	26	9	6	11	36	48	−12	33	
9	Central Coast Mariners	26	8	8	10	35	42	−7	32	
10	Perth Glory	26	8	7	11	32	39	−7	31	
11	Brisbane Roar	26	6	8	12	27	36	−9	26	
12	Western Sydney Wanderers	26	5	6	15	27	43	−16	21	

Source: A-Leagues
Rules for classification: 1) points; 2) goal difference; 3) goals scored; 4) wins; 5) head-to-head results; 5a) head-to-head points; 5b) head-to-head goal difference; 6) Fair Play points; 7) away goal difference; 8) away goals per match; 9) home goal difference; 10) home goals per match; 11) toss of a coin in an event of a tie of two clubs.
(C) Champions

== Venues ==
Newcastle Jets and Adelaide United are both guaranteed a top two finish, and have each secured a home semi-final. Auckland FC and Melbourne Victory both hosted an elimination-final.

Auckland	Adelaide	Australia: New Zealand:	Sydney
Go Media Stadium	Coopers Stadium	Australia: New Zealand:	Allianz Stadium
Capacity: 25,000	Capacity: 16,500	Australia: New Zealand:	Capacity: 45,500
Melbourne		Australia: New Zealand:	Newcastle
AAMI Park		Australia: New Zealand:	McDonald Jones Stadium
Capacity: 30,050		Australia: New Zealand:	Capacity: 33,000

== Bracket ==
The system used for the 2025 A-League Men finals series is the modified top-six play-offs by the A-Leagues. The top two teams entered the two-legged semi-finals receiving the bye for the elimination-finals in which the teams from third placed to sixth place enter the elimination-finals with "third against sixth" and "fourth against fifth". Losers for the elimination-finals were eliminated, and winners qualified for the two-legged semi-finals.

First placed team in the semi-finals played the lowest ranked elimination-final winning team and second placed team in the semi-finals played the highest ranked elimination-final winner. Home-state advantage went to the team with the higher ladder position.

Elimination-finals
4	Melbourne Victory	0
5	Sydney FC	1
3	Auckland FC (p)	1 (7)
6	Melbourne City	1 (6)

Semi-finals
1	Newcastle Jets	1	1	2 (2)
5	Sydney FC (p)	1	1	2 (4)
2	Adelaide United	1	0	1
3	Auckland FC	1	3	4

Grand Final
3	Auckland FC	1
5	Sydney FC	0

== Elimination finals ==
=== First elimination final: Auckland FC vs Melbourne City ===
The first game of the A-League finals series delivered a thriller under the lights at Go Media Stadium, with both winners of silverware last season playing for a spot in next week’s semi-finals. Despite dominating possession in the opening half, it was Melbourne City that looked like the more threatening side with their chances in front of goal. With the seconds ticking away in the first half, Auckland opened the scoring with a sensational header from Guillermo May. City would continue into the second half attacking and attempting to score an equaliser. With just seconds remaining in regulation, Medin Memeti netted one of the most memorable goals in A-Leagues Finals history. the game would go to extra time and then penalties. In an exiting penalty shootout Nathaniel Atkinson would miss the deciding penalty to qualify Auckland for the semi final against Adelaide United.

2 May 2026
17:00 NZST

Auckland FC	1–1 (a.e.t.)	Melbourne City
May 45+3'	Report	Memeti 90+4'
Penalties
Cosgrove (penalty scored); May (penalty scored); Brimmer (penalty scored); Gillion (penalty scored); Pijnaker (penalty scored); Sakai (penalty scored); Hall (penalty scored)	7–6	Nabbout (penalty scored); Leckie (penalty scored); Younis (penalty scored); Schreiber (penalty scored); Memeti (penalty scored); Behich (penalty scored); Atkinson (penalty missed)

Go Media Stadium, Auckland
Attendance: 11,351
Referee: Alex King

Auckland FC	Melbourne City

GK	1	(New Zealand) Michael Woud
RB	2	(Japan) Hiroki Sakai (c) (yellow card) 90+1'
CB	23	(Fiji) Dan Hall (yellow card) 116'
CB	3	(Australia) Jake Girdwood-Reich
LB	17	(New Zealand) Callan Elliot (substituted off) 111'
RM	27	(New Zealand) Logan Rogerson (substituted off) 83'
CM	6	(Belgium) Louis Verstraete
CM	7	(New Zealand) Cameron Howieson (yellow card) 12' (substituted off) 91'
LM	77	(Australia) Lachlan Brook (substituted off) 63'
RF	10	(Uruguay) Guillermo May
LF	21	(New Zealand) Jesse Randall (substituted off) 84'
Substitutes
GK	12	(Australia) James Hilton
DF	4	(New Zealand) Nando Pijnaker (substituted on) 83'
DF	52	(New Zealand) Luka Vicelich (substituted on) 111'
MF	22	(Australia) Jake Brimmer (substituted on) 84' (yellow card) 117'
MF	57	(New Zealand) Van Fitzharris
FW	9	(England) Sam Cosgrove (substituted on) 63'
FW	14	(New Zealand) Liam Gillion (substituted on) 91'
Manager
(Australia) Steve Corica

GK	1	(Australia) Patrick Beach
RB	44	(Australia) Besian Kutleshi (substituted off) 73'
CB	2	(Australia) Harrison Delbridge
CB	22	(Argentina) Germán Ferreyra
LB	16	(Australia) Aziz Behich (c)
DM	7	(Australia) Mathew Leckie
DM	13	(Australia) Nathaniel Atkinson
RW	28	(Australia) Marcus Younis (yellow card) 106'
AM	30	(Austria) Andreas Kuen (substituted off) 73'
LW	11	(Norway) Elbasan Rashani (substituted off) 62'
ST	17	(Australia) Max Caputo (substituted off) 106'
Substitutes
GK	40	(Australia) James Nieuwenhuizen
DF	36	(Australia) Harry Shillington
MF	8	(Australia) Ryan Teague
MF	19	(Australia) Zane Schreiber (substituted on) 106'
FW	10	(Japan) Takeshi Kanamori (substituted on) 73'
FW	15	(Australia) Andrew Nabbout (substituted on) 73'
FW	35	(Australia) Medin Memeti (substituted on) 62'
Manager
(Australia) Aurelio Vidmar

Man of the Match:

Aziz Behich (Melbourne City)

Assistant referees:

Emma Kocbek

Kearney Robinson

Fourth official:

Tim Danaskos

Video assistant referee:

Daniel Elder

Assistant video assistant referees:

Casey Reibelt

Match rules
- 90 minutes.
- 30 minutes of extra time if necessary.
- Penalty shoot-out if scores still level.
- Seven named substitutes.
- Maximum of five substitutions, with a sixth allowed in extra time. (Note: Each team was given only three opportunities to make substitutions, with a fourth opportunity in extra time, excluding substitutions made at half-time, before the start of extra time and at half-time in extra time.)

=== Second elimination final: Melbourne Victory vs Sydney FC ===
This match would be the first time Victory would meet Sydney since Patrick Kisnorbo took the job of Sydney FC coach in March of 2026. This was controversial for Victory Fans as he had previously coached Victory before shockingly departing the club early on 17 December 2024. In the pre-game the camera would pan to show Kisnorbo with a large negative response from the Victory fans. To begin the game Victory would start the game strong but Sydney's defence would hold strong. The half would end scoreless with most chances created by Victory while Sydney's goalkeeper Harrison Devenish-Meares kept a strong performance in goals. This pattern would continue into the second half. Then the referee, after giving a penalty to Victory, as Santos and Paul Okon-Engstler collided, was sent to the pitch-side monitor and decided to overturn his original decision. Three minutes after being substituted on Patrick Wood would capitalise on a mistake by Franco Lino in the 80th minute to put Sydney ahead and would eventually be the difference to win Sydney the game and qualify for the semi final against Newcastle Jets.

2 May 2026
19:40 AEST

Melbourne Victory	0–1	Sydney FC
	Report	Wood 80'

AAMI Park, Melbourne
Attendance: 15,258
Referee: Lachlan Keevers

Melbourne Victory	Sydney FC

GK	40	(Australia) Jack Warshawsky
RB	22	(Australia) Joshua Rawlins
CB	21	(Portugal) Roderick Miranda (c)
CB	2	(Australia) Jason Davidson
LB	18	(Australia) Franco Lino
DM	10	(Australia) Denis Genreau (substituted off) 89'
DM	8	(Australia) Jordi Valadon
RW	11	(Brazil) Santos (substituted off) 71'
AM	64	(Spain) Juan Mata (substituted off) 84'
LW	17	(Australia) Nishan Velupillay (substituted off) 84'
ST	44	(Japan) Charles Nduka (substituted off) 84'
Substitutes
GK	25	(Australia) Jack Duncan
DF	15	(Australia) Sebastian Esposito
MF	14	(Australia) Matthew Grimaldi (substituted on) 84'
MF	23	(Australia) Keegan Jelacic (substituted on) 71'
MF	27	(Australia) Louis D'Arrigo (substituted on) 84'
FW	7	(Australia) Reno Piscopo (substituted on) 89'
FW	9	(Greece) Nikos Vergos (substituted on) 84'
Manager
(Australia) Arthur Diles

GK	12	(Australia) Harrison Devenish-Meares
RB	23	(Australia) Rhyan Grant (c) (substituted off) 73'
CB	41	(Australia) Alexandar Popovic
CB	4	(Australia) Jordan Courtney-Perkins
LB	17	(Australia) Ben Garuccio
DM	8	(Australia) Wataru Kamijo (yellow card) 78'
DM	24	(Australia) Paul Okon-Engstler (yellow card) 68'
RW	44	(Australia) Akol Akon (substituted off) 82'
AM	20	(Australia) Tiago Quintal (substituted off) 61'
LW	7	(Peru) Piero Quispe
ST	80	(Australia) Apostolos Stamatelopoulos (substituted off) 77'
Substitutes
GK	1	(Australia) Gus Hoefsloot
DF	16	(Australia) Joel King
MF	36	(Australia) Rhys Youlley (substituted on) 82'
MF	70	(Germany) Ahmet Arslan (substituted on) 61' (yellow card) 90+5'
FW	9	(Spain) Víctor Campuzano
FW	10	(England) Joe Lolley
FW	13	(Australia) Patrick Wood (substituted on) 77' (yellow card) 85'
Manager
(Australia) Patrick Kisnorbo

Man of the Match:

Harrison Devenish-Meares (Sydney FC)

Assistant referees:

Andrew Meimarakis

Luke Gennimatas

Fourth official:

Ben Abraham

Video assistant referee:

Shaun Evans

Assistant video assistant referees:

Sam Kelly

Match rules
- 90 minutes.
- 30 minutes of extra time if necessary.
- Penalty shoot-out if scores still level.
- Seven named substitutes.
- Maximum of five substitutions, with a sixth allowed in extra time.

== Semi-finals ==
=== Summary ===
Team 1	Agg.	Team 2	1st leg	2nd leg
Newcastle Jets	2–2 (2–4 p)	Sydney FC	1–1	1–1 (a.e.t.)
Adelaide United	1–4	Auckland FC	1–1	0–3

=== Matches ===
==== First semi-final: Newcastle Jets vs Sydney FC ====
===== First leg =====
9 May 2026
19:40 AEST

Sydney FC	1–1	Newcastle Jets
Stamatelopoulos 50'	Report	Adams 58'

Allianz Stadium, Sydney
Attendance: 17,771
Referee: Daniel Elder

GK	12	(Australia) Harrison Devenish-Meares
RB	23	(Australia) Rhyan Grant (c)
CB	41	(Australia) Alexandar Popovic
CB	4	(Australia) Jordan Courtney-Perkins
LB	17	(Australia) Ben Garuccio
DM	8	(Australia) Wataru Kamijo
DM	24	(Australia) Paul Okon-Engstler (yellow card) 17'
RW	44	(Australia) Akol Akon (substituted off) 77'
AM	10	(Australia) Tiago Quintal (substituted off) 66'
LW	7	(Peru) Piero Quispe (substituted off) 86'
ST	80	(Australia) Apostolos Stamatelopoulos (substituted off) 66'
Substitutes
GK	1	(Australia) Gus Hoefsloot
DF	16	(Australia) Joel King
MF	36	(Australia) Rhys Youlley
MF	70	(Germany) Ahmet Arslan (substituted on) 66'
MF	10	(England) Joe Lolley (substituted on) 77'
FW	9	(Spain) Víctor Campuzano (substituted on) 86'
FW	13	(Australia) Patrick Wood (substituted on) 66'
Manager
(Australia) Patrick Kisnorbo

GK	1	(Australia) James Delianov
RB	22	(Australia) Joel Bertolissio
CB	5	(Republic of Ireland) Joe Shaughnessy (yellow card) 73' (substituted off) 75'
CB	33	(Australia) Mark Natta
LB	23	(Australia) Daniel Wilmering
DM	28	(Australia) Will Dobson (substituted off) 65'
DM	14	(Australia) Max Burgess (c)
RW	7	(Australia) Eli Adams
AM	8	(New Zealand) Lachlan Bayliss
LW	13	(Australia) Clayton Taylor (substituted off) 76'
ST	11	(Australia) Ben Gibson (substituted off) 65'
Substitutes
GK	40	(Australia) Jordan Baylis
DF	42	(Australia) Max Cooper
MF	17	(Australia) Kosta Grozos (substituted on) 75'
MF	10	(England) Zach Clough (substituted on) 65'
FW	24	(Australia) Alex Nunes
FW	18	(Japan) Kota Mizunuma (substituted on) 76'
FW	43	(Australia) Xavier Bertoncello (substituted on) 65'
Manager
(Australia) Mark Milligan

Man of the Match:

Wataru Kamijo (Sydney FC)

Assistant referees: Ashley Beecham

Daniel Ilievski

Fourth official:

Tim Danaskos

Video assistant referee:

Alex King

Assistant video assistant referees:

Casey Reibelt

Match rules
- 90 minutes.
- 30 minutes of extra time if necessary.
- Penalty shoot-out if scores still level.
- Seven named substitutes.
- Maximum of five substitutions, with a sixth allowed in extra time.

===== Second leg =====
16 May 2026
19:40 AEST

Newcastle Jets	1–1 (a.e.t.)	Sydney FC
Adams 90+5'	Report	Quispe 63'
Penalties
Grozos (penalty missed); Mizunuma (penalty scored); Gibson (penalty scored); Bertoncello (penalty missed)	2–4	Lolley (penalty missed); Youlley (penalty scored); Campuzano (penalty scored); R. Grant (penalty scored); Garuccio (penalty scored)

McDonald Jones Stadium, Newcastle
Attendance: 25,082
Referee: Shaun Evans

Sydney FC won 2–2 on aggregate via a 4-2 penalty shootout.

GK	1	(Australia) James Delianov
RB	22	(Australia) Joel Bertolissio (yellow card) 103'
CB	5	(Republic of Ireland) Joe Shaughnessy
CB	33	(Australia) Mark Natta (yellow card) 87'
LB	23	(Australia) Daniel Wilmering (yellow card) 46'
DM	14	(Australia) Max Burgess (c) (yellow card) 21' (substituted off) 101'
CM	28	(Australia) Will Dobson (yellow card) 57' (substituted off) 69'
CM	8	(New Zealand) Lachlan Bayliss (substituted off) 101'
RW	7	(Australia) Eli Adams
LW	13	(Australia) Clayton Taylor (substituted off) 90'
ST	80	(Australia) Lachlan Rose (yellow card) 79' (substituted off) 80'
Substitutes
GK	20	(Australia) Alex Nassiep
MF	17	(Australia) Kosta Grozos (substituted on) 101'
MF	24	(Australia) Alex Nunes
MF	10	(England) Zach Clough (substituted on) 101'
FW	18	(Japan) Kota Mizunuma (substituted on) 90'
FW	43	(Australia) Xavier Bertoncello (substituted on) 69'
FW	11	(Australia) Ben Gibson (substituted on) 80'
Manager
(Australia) Mark Milligan

GK	12	(Australia) Harrison Devenish-Meares
RB	23	(Australia) Rhyan Grant (c)
CB	41	(Australia) Alexandar Popovic
CB	4	(Australia) Jordan Courtney-Perkins
LB	17	(Australia) Ben Garuccio
DM	24	(Australia) Paul Okon-Engstler (yellow card) 82'
DM	8	(Australia) Wataru Kamijo (substituted off) 97'
RW	44	(Australia) Akol Akon (substituted off) 97'
AM	20	(Australia) Tiago Quintal (substituted off) 73'
LW	7	(Peru) Piero Quispe (yellow card) 52' (substituted off) 76'
ST	80	(Australia) Apostolos Stamatelopoulos (substituted off) 87'
Substitutes
GK	1	(Australia) Gus Hoefsloot
DF	16	(Australia) Joel King
MF	36	(Australia) Rhys Youlley (substituted on) 73'
MF	10	(England) Joe Lolley (substituted on) 97'
FW	70	(Germany) Ahmet Arslan (substituted on) 97' (yellow card) 113'
FW	9	(Spain) Víctor Campuzano (substituted on) 76'
FW	13	(Australia) Patrick Wood (substituted on) 87' (yellow card) 117'
Manager
(Australia) Patrick Kisnorbo

Match rules
- 90 minutes.
- 30 minutes of extra time if necessary.
- Penalty shoot-out if scores still level.
- Seven named substitutes.
- Maximum of five substitutions, with a sixth allowed in extra time.

==== Second semi-final: Adelaide United vs Auckland FC ====
===== First leg =====
9 May 2026
18:00 NZST

Auckland FC	1–1	Adelaide United
Brook 24'	Report	Crawford 63'

Go Media Stadium, Auckland
Attendance: 16,093
Referee: Ben Abraham

GK	1	(New Zealand) Michael Woud
RB	2	(Japan) Hiroki Sakai (c)
CB	3	(Australia) Jake Girdwood-Reich
CB	23	(Australia) Dan Hall
LB	17	(New Zealand) Callan Elliot (substituted off) 79'
DM	7	(New Zealand) Cam Howieson (substituted off) 57'
DM	6	(Belgium) Louis Verstraete
RW	77	(Australia) Lachlan Brook (substituted off) 79'
LW	21	(New Zealand) Jesse Randall
ST	10	(Uruguay) Guillermo May (substituted off) 51'
ST	9	(England) Sam Cosgrove (yellow card) 80'
Substitutes
GK	12	(Australia) James Hilton
DF	4	(New Zealand) Nando Pijnaker (substituted on) 57'
DF	15	(New Zealand) Francis de Vries (substituted on) 79'
MF	18	(New Zealand) Finn McKenlay
MF	57	(New Zealand) Van Fitzharris
FW	14	(New Zealand) Liam Gillion (substituted on) 79'
FW	27	(New Zealand) Logan Rogerson (substituted on) 51'
Manager
(Australia) Steve Corica

GK	22	(Netherlands) Joshua Smits
RB	14	(Australia) Jay Barnett
CB	3	(Netherlands) Bart Vriends (c)
CB	4	(Australia) Panagiotis Kikianis
LB	19	(Australia) Yaya Dukuly
DM	23	(Australia) Luke Duzel
CM	55	(Australia) Ethan Alagich
CM	44	(Australia) Ryan White (substituted off) 71'
RW	58	(Australia) Harry Crawford (substituted off) 71'
LW	12	(Australia) Jonny Yull (substituted off) 83'
ST	87	(Brazil) Anselmo
Substitutes
GK	40	(Australia) Ethan Cox
DF	52	(Australia) Sotiri Phillis
DF	62	(Australia) Fabian Talladira
MF	10	(Spain) Juan Muñiz (substituted on) 83'
FW	42	(Australia) Austin Ayoubi
FW	11	(Australia) Craig Goodwin (substituted on) 71'
FW	35	(Australia) Brody Burkitt (substituted on) 71'
Manager
(Brazil) Airton Andrioli

Man of the Match:

Harry Crawford (Adelaide United)

Assistant referees:

Anton Shchetinin

Astro Sakalis

Fourth official:

Shaun Evans

Video assistant referee:

Kearney Robinson

Assistant video assistant referees:

Sam Kelly

Match rules
- 90 minutes.
- 30 minutes of extra time if necessary.
- Penalty shoot-out if scores still level.
- Seven named substitutes.
- Maximum of five substitutions, with a sixth allowed in extra time.

===== Second leg =====
15 May 2026
19:05 ACST

Adelaide United	0–3	Auckland FC
	Report	Girdwood-Reich 44'; Cosgrove 58' (pen.); Rogerson 86'

Coopers Stadium, Adelaide
Attendance: 14,716
Referee: Daniel Elder

Auckland FC won 4–1 on aggregate.

GK	22	(Netherlands) Joshua Smits
RB	14	(Australia) Jay Barnett (substituted off) 80'
CB	3	(Netherlands) Bart Vriends (c)
CB	4	(Australia) Panagiotis Kikianis
LB	7	(Australia) Ryan Kitto (substituted off) 70'
DM	55	(Australia) Ethan Alagich (yellow card) 90+4'
DM	44	(Australia) Ryan White
RW	12	(Australia) Lachlan Brook
AM	87	(Brazil) Anselmo (substituted off) 24'
LW	19	(Australia) Yaya Dukuly
ST	35	(Australia) Brody Burkitt (substituted off) 70'
Substitutes
GK	40	(Australia) Ethan Cox
DF	52	(Australia) Sotiri Phillis
DF	58	(Australia) Harry Crawford (substituted on) 80'
MF	23	(Australia) Luke Duzel
MF	10	(Spain) Juan Muñiz (substituted on) 70'
FW	11	(Australia) Craig Goodwin (substituted on) 70'
FW	9	(Australia) Luka Jovanovic (substituted on) 24'
Manager
(Brazil) Airton Andrioli

GK	1	(New Zealand) Michael Woud
RWB	2	(Japan) Hiroki Sakai (c) (yellow card) 4' (substituted off) 71'
CB	3	(Australia) Jake Girdwood-Reich
CB	23	(Australia) Dan Hall
CM	4	(New Zealand) Nando Pijnaker
LWB	17	(New Zealand) Callan Elliot (substituted off) 71'
CM	7	(New Zealand) Cam Howieson
CM	6	(Belgium) Louis Verstraete (yellow card) 64'
RW	77	(Australia) Lachlan Brook (substituted off) 71'
LW	21	(New Zealand) Jesse Randall (substituted off) 83'
ST	9	(England) Sam Cosgrove (substituted off) 71'
Substitutes
GK	12	(Australia) James Hilton
DF	52	(New Zealand) Luka Vicelich (substituted on) 90'
DF	15	(New Zealand) Francis de Vries (substituted on) 76'
MF	18	(New Zealand) Finn McKenlay
MF	57	(New Zealand) Van Fitzharris (substituted on) 90'
FW	14	(New Zealand) Liam Gillion (substituted on) 84'
FW	27	(New Zealand) Logan Rogerson (substituted on) 76'
Manager
(Brazil) Airton Andrioli

Man of the Match:

Sam Cosgrove (Auckland FC)

Assistant referees:

Fourth official:

Video assistant referee:

Assistant video assistant referees:

Match rules
- 90 minutes.
- 30 minutes of extra time if necessary.
- Penalty shoot-out if scores still level.
- Seven named substitutes.
- Maximum of five substitutions, with a sixth allowed in extra time.

== Grand Final ==
23 May 2026
20:10 NZST

Auckland FC	1–0	Sydney FC
Howieson 60'	Report

Go Media Stadium, Auckland
Attendance: 28,374
Referee: Alex King
