= Australia men's national under-23 soccer team =

National under-23 soccer team representing Australia

Australia U-23
- Nickname: Olyroos
- Association: Football Australia
- Confederation: AFC (Asia)
- Sub-confederation: AFF (Southeast Asia)
- Head coach: Vacant
- Captain: Alexander Robinson
- Most caps: Brett Emerton; Mark Milligan (25 each)
- Top scorer: Mark Viduka (17)
- FIFA code: AUS
First colours	Second colours

First international
- New Caledonia 2–1 Australia (Nouméa, New Caledonia; 6 November 1967)

Biggest win
- Australia 14–0 Northern Mariana Islands (Xi'an, China; 3 September 2025)

Biggest defeat
- Australia 1–6 Poland (Barcelona, Spain; 5 August 1992); Australia 0–5 Japan (Pekanbaru, Indonesia; 15 July 2012)

Summer Olympics
- Appearances: 6 (first in 1992)
- Best result: Fourth place (1992)

AFC U-23 Asian Cup
- Appearances: 7 (first in 2013)
- Best result: Third place (2020)
- Website: Website

The Australia national under-23 soccer team represents Australia in international under-23 soccer and at the Olympic Games. The team is controlled by the governing body for soccer in Australia, Football Australia (FA), which is currently a member of the Asian Football Confederation (AFC) and the regional ASEAN Football Federation (AFF) since leaving the Oceania Football Confederation (OFC) in 2006. The team's official nickname is the Olyroos.

Australia's first two appearances in the Olympic Games saw the senior men's team participate, but in 1992 the eligibility was restricted to players under the age of 23, while in 1996, it was decided to allow teams to choose three over-age players in the final Olympic squads.

The team has represented Australia at the Olympic Games on six occasions, in 1992, 1996, 2000, 2004, 2008 and 2020 games. The team also represented Australia at the AFC U-23 Championship tournaments in 2013, 2016, 2018 & 2020.

== History ==
=== Early years ===
The Australian national under-23 team made its international debut in 1967, when it took part in a triangular tournament against New Caledonia and New Zealand in Nouméa. Australia lost its first game 2–1 on 6 November, and won its second 1–3 on 10 November, with Garry Manuel supplying goals in both games. The team next played almost eight years later in 1974, in a tour of Indonesia, sponsored by the Australian Government. During the tour, Australia, coached by Eric Worthington, won all three match against the host nation. It would then be another 16 years before the team competed in international competition of any kind.

In August 1990, Australia played a series of friendly matches in Europe under coach Eddie Thomson. The first against Switzerland ended in a 0–0 draw. The second match was played against the League of Ireland XI, and ended in a 2–2 draw, with goals from Gary Hasler and John Gibson. Australia's final match was lost 2–0 against Czechoslovakia.

=== Olympic Games ===
==== 1992 Barcelona Olympics ====
The team's first Olympic football tournament, coached by Eddie Thomson contained just two overseas based players: KV Mechelen striker Zlatko Arambasic and Club Brugge midfielder Paul Okon, as the rest of the squad hailed from NSL clubs. The squad saw Mark Bosnich, John Filan, Tony Vidmar and Tony Popovic, and most importantly, Ned Zelic, who had virtually single-handedly gotten the Olyroos to Barcelona with a sensational double strike in the second leg play off against the much admired Dutch team, take part before commencing their careers in Europe.

Drawn with Mexico, Denmark and Ghana, the Olyroos would take on the Africans in Zaragoza in their first round fixture. An early goal on 12 minutes, a long range free kick by Mohammed Gargo set the tone for Ghana as they held onto that lead until the 83rd minute when it was extended to 2–0 by Kwame Ayew. Ayew grabbed another on 89 minutes before Tony Vidmar scored a consolation goal for Australia on 91 minutes to bring the score to 3–1. John Filan was eventually dropped after this game after coming under heavy criticism for failing to put up a wall for Ghana's first goal, and the ever green Mark Bosnich was brought in, cementing his spot in the side for the Olympics.

Two days later in Barcelona, Zlatko Arambasic opened the scoring after 20 minutes as Australia lead Mexico 1–0 until the 63rd minute when Jorge Castañeda leveled the tie at 1–1, the game would finish this way which meant that Australia would need to win their last group stage game to proceed to the knock-out stages.

The Olyroos finally put in a performance worthy of note as the entire team began to fire on all cylinders, winning 3–0 against Denmark to book a spot in the quarter-finals. The game saw one first half goal by John Markovski and two second half goals thanks to Damian Mori and Tony Vidmar.

Australia and Ghana progressed to the knock-out stages where Australia were tied to play against Sweden in Barcelona. In front of 30, 000 spectators at the Camp Nou, John Markovski put Australia ahead after 30 minutes. A 53rd-minute strike by Shaun Murphy put the Olyroos 2–0 up until Patrik Andersson scored one back for Sweden on 62 minutes. The game stayed at 2–1 and the result sent the Olyroos to the semi-finals where they would face Poland.

At the Camp Nou in front of 45,000 spectators, Poland struck on 27 minutes, taking the lead after a goal from Wojciech Kowalczyk. Australia, however, hit back on 35 minutes when Adelaide City striker Carl Veart equalised. Just before half time though, Mark Viduka lashed out at a Polish defender, earning himself a straight red card, and leaving the Australian's a man down against a Polish side who were technically gifted all over the park. Poland truly came to life in the second period, putting on a dazzling display of soccer and scoring five goals in the process, which saw a hat-trick from Andrzej Juskowiak and an own goal from Shaun Murphy, to take out the game at 6–1.

In the bronze medal game, Australia would meet up with group stage outfit Ghana, who took the lead when Isaac Asare scored after 19 minutes and eventually winning the game 1–0, the result left the Olyroos to claim fourth spot at the tournament, as Spain would finish in first place after beating Poland 3–2.

==== 1996 Atlanta Olympics ====
Eddie Thomson took a young squad to the United States, which included Aurelio Vidmar and Steve Horvat as the overaged players, the squad was combined of 7 overseas players out of the 18 men squad. A young Mark Viduka was in his second year at Dinamo Zagreb in Croatia and Kevin Muscat had just signed with English Premier League club Crystal Palace. Drawn into Group B with European heavy weights Spain and France, as well as Saudi Arabia, the Olyroos would lose 2–0 to France in their opening clash thanks to goals from Robert Pires and Florian Maurice, as Australia's Danny Tiatto saw a red card just after 24 minutes. A 2–1 win over Saudi Arabia earned the Olyroos their first 3 points of the campaign. Peter Tsekenis scored after just 12 minutes before the Saudis were able to draw level through Mohammed Al Khilaiwi on 37 minutes. On 63 minutes Mark Viduka put Australia in front as Australia came out winners at 2–1. After leading Spain 2–0 courtesy of two early goals from Aurelio Vidmar, Raúl González scored one on 40 minutes, Santiago Denia added after 86 minutes to level the tie. Shortly after, the deadlock was broken as Raúl netted on the 90th minute to seal victory for Spain. The result had eliminated Australia from tournament as Spain and France progressed to the knock-out stages.

==== 2000 Sydney Olympics ====
In a full-strength side, which included Stan Lazaridis, Josip Skoko and Mark Viduka as over aged players, under coach Raul Blanco the Olyroos were drawn against Italy, Nigeria and Honduras in Group A. In front of 93, 252 spectators at the Melbourne Cricket Ground, Australia were defeated 1–0 by an Italian Andrea Pirlo goal after 81 minutes. At the Sydney Football Stadium, Australia's second group stage fixture saw them down 2–0 against Nigeria after just 22 minutes. Two goals in the space of just four minutes from Hayden Foxe and Kasey Wehrman saw Australia draw level just before half time. The second half saw the expulsion of both Brett Emerton and Celestine Babayaro ten minutes after play had commenced. On 64 minutes, Victor Agali's goal was enough to see Nigeria take out the game at 3–2. The result meant that Australia had been knocked out of the tournament with one match remaining. In Sydney, Honduras sealed a 2–1 victory after a brace by Cagliari striker David Suazo. Hondouras would finish in third place, Nigeria and Italy finished in the top two positions whereas the hosts finished in bottom spot on 0 points, much to the disappointment of the local media and then-active Australian Soccer Association.

==== 2004 Athens Olympics ====
Frank Farina took an 18-man squad which included Millwall's Tim Cahill, Osasuna's striker John Aloisi and Rangers' defender Craig Moore as over aged players. The squad proved to be good enough to reach the quarter finals, drawing 1–1 with Tunisia thanks to an Aloisi equaliser and beating Serbia and Montenegro in a 5–1 thrashing which saw a brace from Aloisi, Ahmad Elrich and a goal by Cahill. Australia would lose 1–0 to Argentina when Andrés D'Alessandro scored after 9 minutes in their final group stage game as both teams went on to qualify for the knock out stages. Australia would meet Iraq at the quarter-final stage where Emad Mohammed scored after 64 minutes, sending Iraq through to the semi-finals as they won the game 1–0.

==== 2008 Beijing Olympics ====
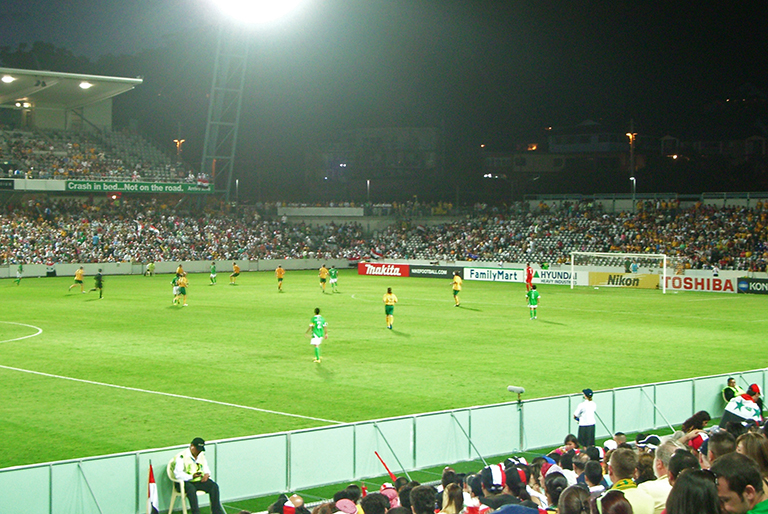
The 'Olyroos' playing v Iraq at Bluetongue Stadium in 2007

The Olyroos' first qualifying game for the 2008 Beijing Olympics was held on 7 February 2007, when Australia hosted Taiwan in Adelaide. Midfielder Kristian Sarkies became the first player to score a hat-trick for the Under-23's in the Asian competition and Australia won the home tie 11–0. They then travelled to Taipei and narrowly edged out the home side 1–0 in difficult conditions to advance to the second stage of the qualifications. In February 2007 the Olyroos played Iran in the first game of the second round, which resulted in a 0–0 draw. In the second game of the round, against Jordan in Adelaide, they drew 1–1. This result left Australia in second spot, four points behind leaders Saudi Arabia. Against Saudi Arabia, Australia won the first leg 2–0 and lost 2–1 in the second. In May 2007 they defeated Iran 3–1. Australia qualified for the third and final round of the Asian qualifications after beating Jordan 4–0 in their final game in June 2007. The Olyroos met Iraq, Korea DPR and Lebanon at the final round (August until November 2007). Australia started their campaign with a scoreless draw against Iraq in Doha. Then the Olyroos went on to win their home games against North Korea (1–0) and Lebanon (3–0). After another scoreless draw against Lebanon in Beirut, Australia was behind Iraq with both eight points but Iraq leading because of the better goal difference. The decisive match was held in Gosford on 17 November 2007 and saw the Olyroos emerging as 2–0 winners thanks to goal from Adrian Leijer and Mark Milligan. The following 1–1 draw against North Korea in Pyongyang sealed Australia's qualification for Beijing, as they finished as group winners with 12 points, one more than Iraq.

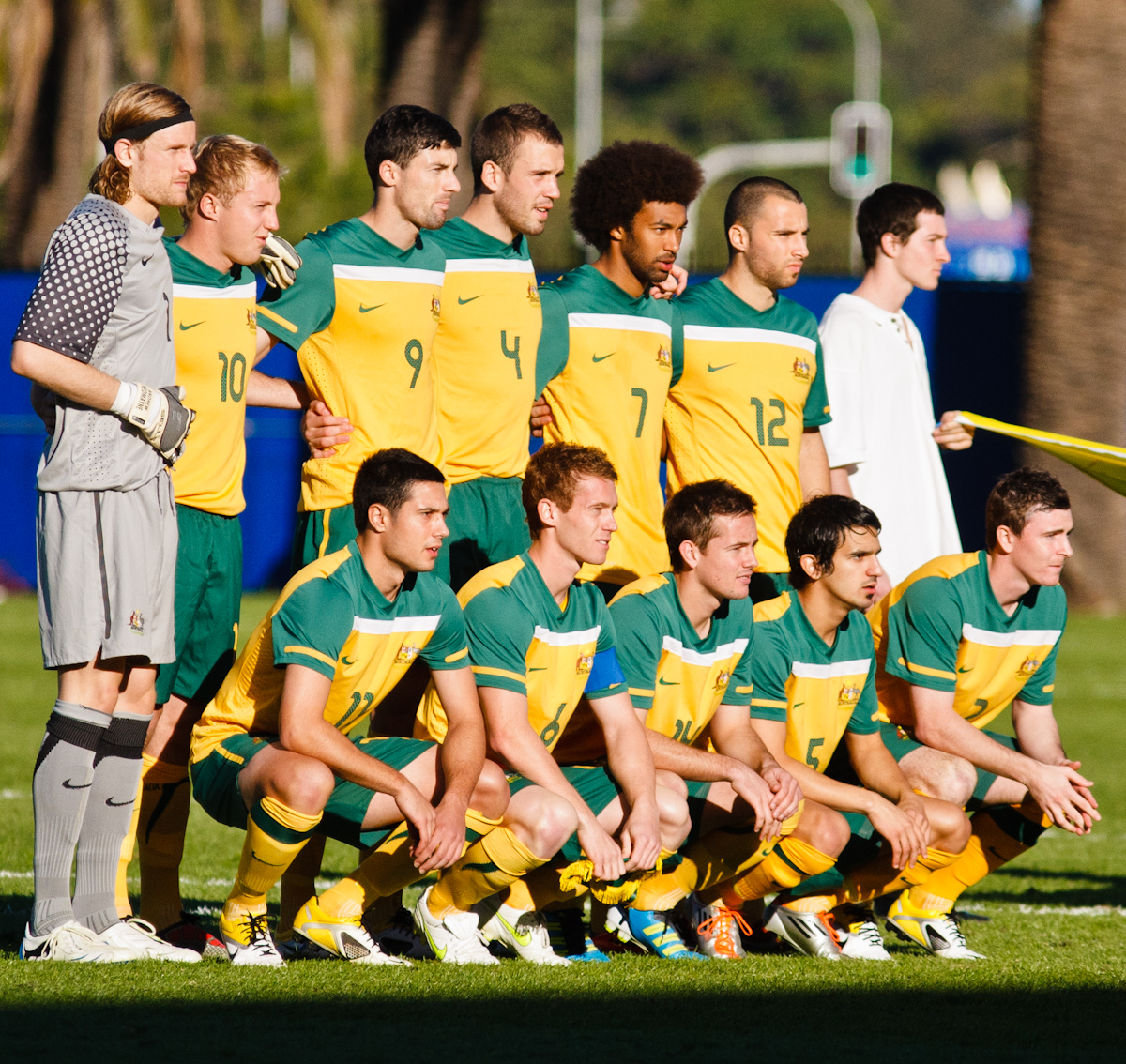
The starting team for the Olyroos match against Yemen on 19 June 2011

When the eventual tournament took place in August 2008, the Olyroos were drawn against Argentina, Ivory Coast and Serbia where coach Graham Arnold had controversially left out overseas-based players Nathan Burns and Bruce Djite, which left half of the squad including domestic players. A hopeful squad looked upon by the public which included Nürnberg's Matthew Spiranovic and Gençlerbirliği's James Troisi, the experience of Archie Thompson and Jade North were included as the over aged players. Shanghai was the venue of Australia's first group stage clash against Serbia, which saw them go in front after 69 minutes thanks to a Ruben Zadkovich goal. Slobodan Rajković however leveled the scores after 78 minutes to end the game at 1–1. Australia's second game was against Argentina, who had beaten Ivory Coast 2–1 in their opening clash. The Olyroos held the Albiceleste at 0–0 until Napoli's Ezequiel Lavezzi latched on to a cross to score after 76 minutes. The full strength Argentina side, a team that included Roman Riquelme, Sergio Agüero and Lionel Messi, took out the game at 1–0 which left Australia in a must-win situation against the Ivory Coast. An 81st minute Salomon Kalou strike gave Côte d'Ivoire a 1–0 victory knocking Australia out of the tournament.

==== 2012 London Olympics ====
Under coach Aurelio Vidmar, Australia commenced their qualification for the 2012 London Olympic soccer tournament in the second round of qualification where they faced Yemen in a two-game series, the first on 19 June 2011 at Central Coast Stadium in Gosford and the second on 23 June at Newcastle International Sports Centre in Newcastle. Australia won 7–0 on aggregate and progressed to the next stage. For the third round of the qualifiers Australia was drawn into Group B with Iraq, Uzbekistan and the United Arab Emirates, with the group's fixtures commencing in September 2011 and concluding in March 2012. Australia's attempt to qualify for the 2012 Olympic Games failed, with the team finishing last in their group, with four draws and two losses. All four draws were nil-all and Australia failed to score in all six games.

==== 2020 Tokyo Olympics ====
Australia returned to the Olympics after missing the 2012 and 2016 editions, with the team largely composed of mostly A-League players, a number of Europe-based players and Mitchell Duke as the only over-aged player, being drawn in Group C, alongside Argentina, Spain and Egypt.

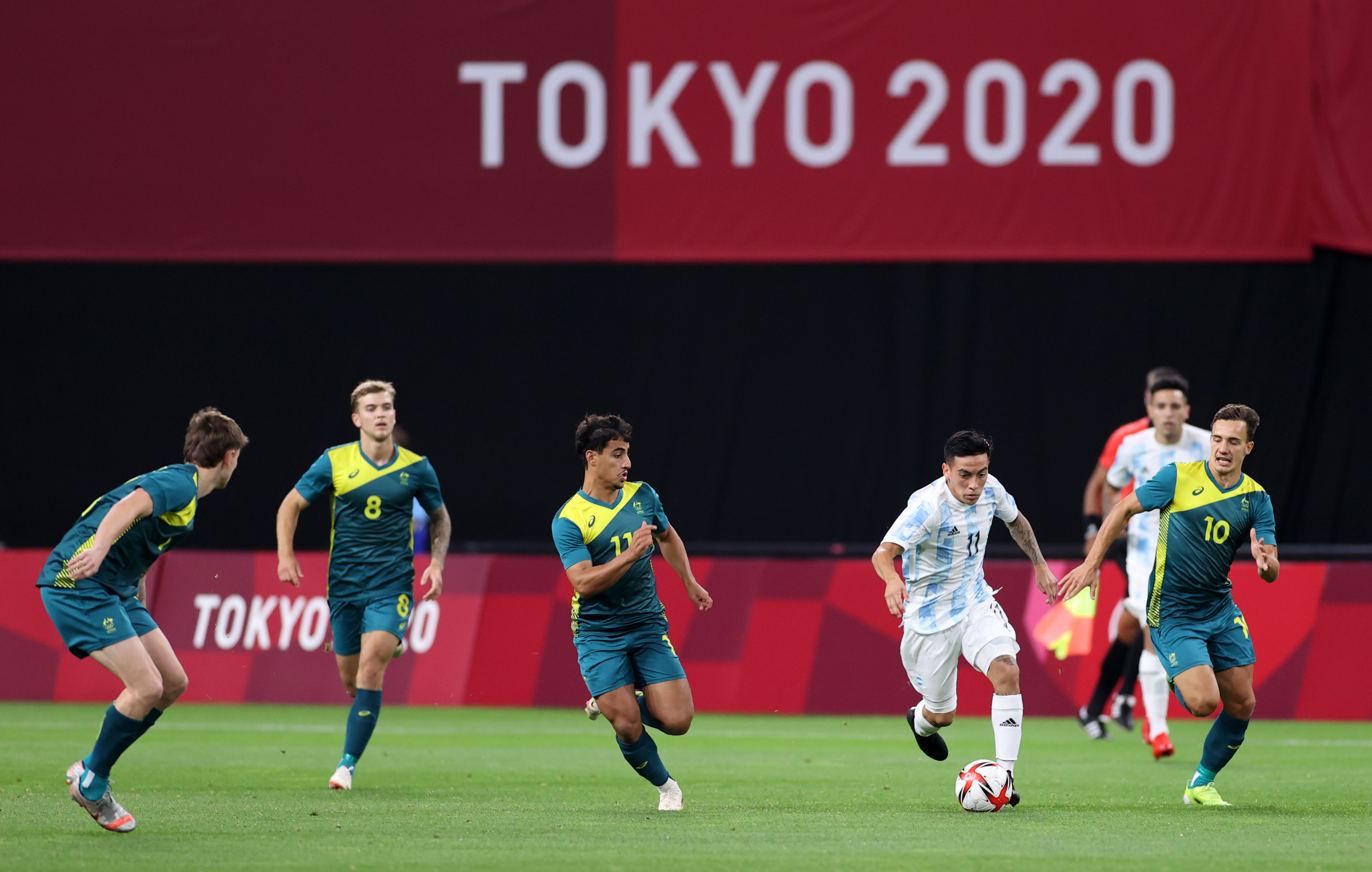
The Olyroos playing v Argentina in the 2020 Summer Olympics

Australia, in their first game since the 2008 Summer Olympics, defeated Argentina 2–0 with goals scored by Lachlan Wales and Marco Tilio, as well as having a numerical advantage following the expulsion of Argentina's Francisco Ortega. Australia then nearly held on for a draw to Spain however conceded a goal scored by Mikel Oyarzabal in the 81st minute, ending the game with a 1–0 loss. Australia needed at least a draw against Egypt to progress to the next stage however lost 2–0 and finished last in the group.

==== 2032 Brisbane Olympics ====
Australia automatically qualified for the 2032 Summer Olympics held in Brisbane.

=== AFC U23 Championship / Asian Cup ===
==== 2013 AFC U22 Championship ====
In July 2012 the Olyroos travelled to Pekanbaru, Indonesia for the qualification round to participate in the inaugural 2013 AFC U-22 Championship. Wins over Indonesia, Macau and Timor-Leste, a draw with Singapore and a heavy loss to Japan left Australia in second place in the group. This was enough to qualify to the final tournament which was hosted by Oman in January 2014. Despite a 4–0 loss to Japan in the group stage, Australia still managed to top their group, but were eliminated in the quarter final after a 2–1 loss to Saudi Arabia.

==== 2016 AFC U23 Championship ====
The 2016 AFC U-23 Championship final tournament was held in Qatar from 12 to 30 January 2016. Australia qualified for the tournament by winning all three group matches in the qualification stage in Taiwan in March 2015. The Olyroos recorded comprehensive victories; 6–0 against Hong Kong with Jamie Maclaren scoring three; 4–0 against the hosts Chinese Taipei and 5–1 over Myanmar where Andrew Hoole scored a hat trick.

The 2016 AFC U-23 Championship doubled as the qualifying tournament for the 2016 Summer Olympics Football tournament in Rio de Janeiro. Australia were eliminated from the championship in the group stage. A 1–0 loss to United Arab Emirates followed by a 2–0 win over Vietnam meant that Australia needed to defeat Jordan in the final group match. A nil-all draw resulted in the elimination for Australia from the tournament and hence failure to qualify for the Olympics for the second consecutive time.

==== 2018 AFC U23 Championship ====
Australia qualified for the 2018 AFC U-23 Championship final tournament in China in January 2018, after wins in the qualifying event against Brunei, Singapore and Myanmar. Australia scored 12 goals and did not concede any during qualification.

Ante Milicic coached the team who failed to get out of the group in the tournament. They won their first match 3–1 against Syria with George Blackwood scoring twice. They then lost the next game to Vietnam 1–0. In the final game against Korea Republic, Australia was three goals down before scoring twice however they were unable to complete the comeback required and the result of 3–2 saw Australia end their tournament third in the group.

==== 2020 AFC U23 Championship ====
In March 2019 Australia participated in the 2020 AFC U-23 Championship qualification rounds. They travelled to Cambodia who were the hosts of the group that also included Chinese Taipei and South Korea. Australia's first match was a 6–0 win against Cambodia. Two days later they defeated Chinese Taipei by the same scoreline. The eleven group winners and the four best runners-up would qualify for the final tournament held in Thailand in 2020 so Australia needed to ensure they did not lose in the third match against South Korea. Nicholas D'Agostino gave Australia the lead in the 16th minute which he then doubled in the 24th minute. However, the Koreans responded quickly, scoring in the 26th minute and when they equalised in the 63rd minute, this placed them at the top of the group at Australia's expense. The match finished 2-all however, as the best runner-up of the 11 groups, Australia still qualified for the 2020 AFC U-23 Championship as one of the top 4 runner-ups.

The 2020 AFC U-23 Championship was hosted by Thailand and a top three finish was required for Australia to progress to the Olympics for the first time since 2008. Australia, coached by Graham Arnold, faced Iraq in the opening game. Reno Piscopo opened the scoring in the second half although 15 minutes later Iraq equalised and the game finished 1–1. Australia's next match was against the host Thailand. After going behind in the first half, Nicholas D'Agostino leveled the score just before half time and then scored the winner in the 76th minute. Now sitting on top of the group, a win or draw against debutant Bahrain would secure progression. Ramy Najjarine scored Australia's only goal and despite Bahrain scoring in first half injury time, the Olyroos held on to top the group and move through to the quarter-finals.

The quarter-final opponent was Syria and the game entered extra time after a scoreless ninety minutes. Australia's Al Hassan Toure scored the only goal of the game to send them through to the semi-finals for the first time.

Australia next played South Korea, a team that had won all four of its matches in the tournament. The Koreans won the match 2–0 with both goals coming in the second half sending Australia into a third place playoff with defending champions Uzbekistan for the final AFC qualification spot for the 2020 Olympics.

Australia defeated Uzbekistan 1–0 at the Rajamangala Stadium in Bangkok to claim third-place, their best ever finish in the tournament, which also qualified them for the Summer Olympics for the first time since 2008. D'Agostino scored the only goal in the 47th minute. Uzbekistan's Oybek Bozorov was sent off in the 59th minute, just 6 minutes after coming on although Australia couldn't take advantage and didn't add to their tally.

==== 2022 AFC U-23 Asian Cup ====
For the 2022 AFC U-23 Asian Cup, Australia was drawn into Group B with Iraq, Jordan and Kuwait.

Australia began their tournament with a 2–0 win over Kuwait, with goals from Louis D'Arrigo and Jay Rich-Baghuelou. Three days later, Australia went down to ten men against Iraq after Kusini Yengi was shown a red card in the 17th minute of Australia's second match. Alou Kuol scored the opening goal of the match near the end of half time, however, Hasan Abdulkareem equalized for Iraq in the second half, and the game ended in a 1–1 draw. In their final group stage match against Jordan, a 61st-minute penalty from Ramy Najjarine gave Australia a 1–0 victory, despite Tristan Hammond receiving a red card in the 79th minute. The win saw Australia top Group B and advance to the quarter-finals.

Australia faced Turkmenistan in the quarter-finals, where an own goal from Oraz Orazow secured Australia a 1–0 victory. In the semi-finals, Australia lost 2–0 to Saudi Arabia. During the match, Australia went down to ten men for the third time in the tournament after Jay Rich-Baghuelou received a red card in the 35th minute. In the third place play-off, Australia lost 3–0 to Japan, finishing the tournament in fourth place.

==== 2024 AFC U-23 Asian Cup ====
The 2024 AFC U-23 Asian Cup campaign was the worst for the Olyroos in their participation history. In their first match, they drew with Jordan, despite having a one-man advantage for the last ten minutes. In the following match, they lost to Indonesia 1–0, in a match where Mohamed Toure failed to convert a penalty attempt. They were again goalless in their draw with Qatar, resulting in the Olyroos finishing the tournament without scoring a goal.

== Results and fixtures ==
The following is a list of match results in the last 12 months, as well as any future matches that have been scheduled.

Legend

Win Draw Loss Fixture

=== 2026 ===
8 January 2026 AFC U-23 Asian Cup GS	Australia	2–1	Thailand	Riyadh, Saudi Arabia
14:30 UTC+3	Alagich 29' (pen.); Macallister 30'	Report	Sittha 8'	Stadium: Al-Shabab Stadium; Attendance: 90; Referee: Kim Yu-jeong (South Korea)

11 January 2026 AFC U-23 Asian Cup GS	China	1–0	Australia	Riyadh, Saudi Arabia
14:30 UTC+3	Peng Xiao 43'	Report		Stadium: Al-Shabab Stadium; Attendance: 475; Referee: Thoriq Alkatiri (Indonesia)

14 January 2026 AFC U-23 Asian Cup GS	Iraq	1–2	Australia	Riyadh, Saudi Arabia
14:30 UTC+3	Faisal 63' (pen.)	Report	Dukuly 90+3'; Macallister 90+7'	Stadium: Prince Faisal bin Fahd Stadium; Attendance: 183; Referee: Abdullah Jamali (Kuwait)

17 January 2026 AFC U-23 Asian Cup QF	Australia	1–2	South Korea	Jeddah, Saudi Arabia
18:30 UTC+3	Jovanovic 51'	Report	Baek Ga-on 21'; Shin Min-ha 88'	Stadium: Prince Abdullah Al-Faisal Stadium; Attendance: 172; Referee: Fu Ming (China)

3 October Friendly	Australia	1–2	South Korea	Gosford, Australia
15:00 UTC+10	Kim Min-soo 19' (o.g.)	Report	Ha Jeong-woo 2'; Yoon Do-young 39' (pen.)	Stadium: polytec Stadium

6 October Friendly	Australia	2–2	South Korea	Gosford, Australia
13:00 UTC+11	Di Pizio 45+5'; Akon 73'	Report	Sung Ye-geon 12'; Kim Ye-geon 36'	Stadium: polytec Stadium

== Coaching staff ==
=== Current coaching staff ===
As of 13 February 2026

Position	Name
Head coach	Vacant
Assistant coach	Vacant

== Players ==
=== Current squad ===
The following players were called up for friendlies against South Korea on 3rd and 6th October 2026.

Caps and goals correct as of 6 October 2026, after the game against South Korea.

No.	Pos.	Player	Date of birth (age)	Caps	Goals	Club
1	GK	Alexander Robinson (Captain)	9 March 2005 (age 21)	1	0	(Football Australia) Macarthur FC
12	GK	George Plusnin	27 December 2007 (age 18)	1	0	(Football Australia) Brisbane Roar
18	GK	Jai Ajanovic	31 August 2008 (age 18)	0	0	(Football Australia) Central Coast Mariners
2	DF	Jesse Cameron	11 August 2005 (age 21)	0	0	(Football Australia) Sutherland Sharks
3	DF	Liam Bonetig	20 August 2005 (age 21)	2	0	(Football Australia) Melbourne City
4	DF	Panagiotis Kikianis	8 March 2005 (age 21)	2	0	(Football Australia) Adelaide United
5	DF	Sebastian Duarte		0	0	(Football Australia) Wollongong Wolves
13	DF	James Overy	9 November 2007 (age 18)	5	0	(Football Australia) Sydney FC
14	DF	Fabian Talladira	4 February 2006 (age 20)	1	0	(Football Australia) Adelaide United
16	DF	Nathan Barrie	29 May 2006 (age 20)	0	0	(Football Australia) Western Sydney Wanderers
6	MF	Oliver Randazzo	12 November 2006 (age 19)	1	0	(Football Australia) Macarthur FC
7	MF	Tiago Quintal	16 June 2006 (age 20)	2	0	(Football Australia) Sydney FC
8	MF	Rhys Youlley	13 February 2005 (age 21)	2	0	(Football Australia) Sydney FC
10	MF	Jonny Yull	5 March 2005 (age 21)	1	0	(Football Australia) Adelaide United
15	MF	Wataru Kamijo	17 April 2006 (age 20)	1	0	(Football Australia) Sydney FC
19	MF	Miguel Di Pizio	4 January 2006 (age 20)	2	1	(Football Australia) Western Sydney Wanderers
20	MF	Lawrence Wong	6 October 2007 (age 19)	1	0	(Football Australia) Melbourne City
21	MF	Quinn MacNicol	10 January 2008 (age 18)	1	0	(Football Australia) Melbourne City
9	FW	Medin Memeti	20 June 2007 (age 19)	2	0	(Football Australia) Melbourne City
11	FW	Dean Bosnjak	11 October 2006 (age 20)	1	0	(Football Australia) Macarthur FC
17	FW	Akol Akon	21 May 2009 (age 17)	2	1	(Football Australia) Sydney FC
22	FW	Amlani Tatu	1 July 2008 (age 18)	2	0	(Football Australia) Adelaide United
23	FW	Atiya Waraga	24 December 2006 (age 19)	1	0	(Football Australia) Western Sydney Wanderers

=== Recent call-ups ===
- The following players have been called up within the last 12 months and remain eligible for selection.

Pos.	Player	Date of birth (age)	Caps	Goals	Club	Latest call-up
GK	Lachlan Allen	4 April 2009 (age 17)	0	0	(Australia) Western Sydney Wanderers	2026 AFC U-23 Asian Cup, 6–24 January 2026
GK	Steven Hall	16 January 2005 (age 21)	6	0	(England) Brighton & Hove Albion	2026 AFC U-23 Asian Cup, 6–24 January 2026
GK	Dylan Peraić-Cullen	25 July 2006 (age 20)	1	0	(Australia) Central Coast Mariners	2026 AFC U-23 Asian Cup, 6–24 January 2026
DF	Joshua Inserra	21 January 2005 (age 21)	1	0	(Australia) Melbourne Victory	v. South Korea, 3 October 2026
DF	Franco Lino	26 August 2005 (age 21)	1	0	(Australia) Melbourne Victory	v. South Korea, 3 October 2026
MF	Louis Agosti	2 March 2005 (age 21)	3	0	(Italy) Dolomiti Bellunesi	2026 AFC U-23 Asian Cup, 6–24 January 2026
MF	Mathias Macallister	12 April 2007 (age 19)	4	2	(Australia) Sydney FC	2026 AFC U-23 Asian Cup, 6–24 January 2026
MF	Jaylan Pearman	18 April 2006 (age 20)	3	0	(England) Queens Park Rangers	2026 AFC U-23 Asian Cup, 6–24 January 2026
FW	Luka Jovanovic	20 May 2005 (age 21)	4	1	(United States) San Jose Earthquakes	2026 AFC U-23 Asian Cup, 6–24 January 2026
FW	Marcus Younis	3 July 2005 (age 21)	1	0	(Denmark) Brøndby	2026 AFC U-23 Asian Cup, 6–24 January 2026

=== Over-age players in Olympic Games ===
Tournament	Player 1	Player 2	Player 3
1996	Steve Horvat (MF)	Aurelio Vidmar (FW)	did not select
2000	Stan Lazaridis (MF)	Josip Skoko (MF)	Mark Viduka (FW)
2004	Craig Moore (DF)	Tim Cahill (MF)	John Aloisi (FW)
2008	Jade North (DF)	David Carney (MF)	Archie Thompson (FW)
2020	Mitchell Duke (FW)	did not select	

== Competitive record ==
In 1992, 1996 and 2004 Olympics, Australia qualified representing OFC, while in 2008 and 2020 representing AFC. They automatically qualified for the 2000 Olympics as hosts and are set to do it again as host of the 2032 Olympics.

Summer Olympics record
Appearances: 6
Year	Round	Position	Pld	W	D	L	GF	GA
1900–1988	See Australia men's national soccer team							
(Spain) 1992	Fourth place	4th	6	2	1	3	8	12
(United States) 1996	Group stage	13th	3	1	0	2	4	6
(Australia) 2000	Group stage	15th	3	0	0	3	3	6
(Greece) 2004	Quarter-finals	7th	4	1	1	2	6	4
(China) 2008	Group stage	11th	3	0	1	2	1	3
(United Kingdom) 2012	Did not qualify							
(Brazil) 2016	Did not qualify							
(Japan) 2020	Group stage	12th	3	1	0	2	2	3
(France) 2024	Did not qualify							
(United States) 2028	To be determined							
(Australia) 2032	Qualified as hosts							
Total	Fourth place	6/11	22	5	3	14	24	34

AFC U-23 Asian Cup record
Appearances: 7
Year	Round	Position	Pld	W	D	L	GF	GA
(Oman) 2013	Quarter-finals	6th	4	2	0	2	3	6
(Qatar) 2016	Group stage	9th	3	1	1	1	2	1
(China) 2018	Group stage	11th	3	1	0	2	5	5
(Thailand) 2020	Third place	3rd	6	3	2	1	6	5
(Uzbekistan) 2022	Fourth place	4th	6	3	1	2	5	6
(Qatar) 2024	Group stage	12th	3	0	2	1	0	1
(Saudi Arabia) 2026	Quarter-finals	7th	4	2	0	2	5	5
(Japan) 2028	To be determined							
Total	Third place	7/8	29	12	6	11	26	29

=== Other tournaments ===
WAFF U-23 Championship record
Appearances: 1
Year	Round	Position	Pld	W	D	L	GF	GA
(Saudi Arabia) 2024	Runners-up	2nd	3	1	2	0	5	4

AFF U-23 Championship record
Appearances: 0
Year	Round	Position	Pld	W	D	L	GF	GA
(Thailand) 2005	Not an AFF member							
(Cambodia) 2019	Did not enter							
(Cambodia) 2022	Did not enter							
(Thailand) 2023	Did not enter							
(Indonesia) 2025	Did not enter							

== Head-to-head record ==
The following table shows Australia men's national under-23 soccer team's head-to-head record in the Olympic Games and AFC U-23 Asian Cup.

In the Olympic Games

Opponent	Pld	W	D	L	GF	GA	GD	Win %
Argentina	3	1	0	2	2	2	+0	33.33
Denmark	1	1	0	0	3	0	+3	100.00
Egypt	1	0	0	1	0	2	−2	0.00
France	1	0	0	1	0	2	−2	0.00
Ghana	2	0	0	2	1	4	−3	0.00
Honduras	1	0	0	1	1	2	−1	0.00
Iraq	1	0	0	1	0	1	−1	0.00
Italy	1	0	0	1	0	1	−1	0.00
Ivory Coast	1	0	0	1	0	1	−1	0.00
Mexico	1	0	1	0	1	1	+0	0.00
Nigeria	1	0	0	1	2	3	−1	0.00
Poland	1	0	0	1	1	6	−5	0.00
Saudi Arabia	1	1	0	0	2	1	+1	100.00
Serbia	2	1	1	0	6	2	+4	50.00
Spain	2	0	0	2	2	4	−2	0.00
Sweden	1	1	0	0	2	1	+1	100.00
Tunisia	1	0	1	0	1	1	+0	0.00
Total	22	5	3	14	24	34	−10	22.73

In the AFC U-23 Asian Cup

Opponent	Pld	W	D	L	GF	GA	GD	Win %
Bahrain	1	0	1	0	1	1	+0	0.00
China	1	0	0	1	0	1	−1	0.00
Indonesia	1	0	0	1	0	1	−1	0.00
Iran	1	1	0	0	1	0	+1	100.00
Iraq	3	1	2	0	4	3	+1	33.33
Japan	2	0	0	2	0	7	−7	0.00
Jordan	3	1	2	0	1	0	+1	33.33
Kuwait	2	2	0	0	3	0	+3	100.00
Qatar	1	0	1	0	0	0	+0	0.00
Saudi Arabia	2	0	0	2	1	4	−3	0.00
South Korea	3	0	0	3	3	7	−4	0.00
Syria	2	2	0	0	4	1	+3	100.00
Thailand	2	2	0	0	4	2	+2	100.00
Turkmenistan	1	1	0	0	1	0	+1	100.00
United Arab Emirates	1	0	0	1	0	1	−1	0.00
Uzbekistan	1	1	0	0	1	0	+1	100.00
Vietnam	2	1	0	1	2	1	+1	50.00
Total	29	12	6	11	26	29	−3	41.38

== See also ==
- Sport in Australia
  - Soccer in Australia
- Australia men's national soccer team
- Australia men's national under-20 soccer team
- Australia men's national under-17 soccer team
