= Harrison Devenish-Meares =

Australian professional soccer player (born 1996)

Personal information
- Date of birth: 27 October 1996 (age 30)
- Place of birth: Sydney, New South Wales, Australia
- Height: 1.90 m (6 ft 3 in)
- Position: Goalkeeper

Team information
- Current team: Sydney FC
- Number: 12

Youth career
- Blacktown City
- Rockdale Ilinden
- Sydney FC
- –2016: Northern Tigers

College career
Years	Team	Apps	(Gls)
2017–2019	South Florida Bulls	38	(0)

Senior career*
Years	Team	Apps	(Gls)
2013–2017	Northern Tigers		(0)
2019	Portland Phoenix	7	(0)
2020	Bucharest United		
2020–2021	Rapid București	0	(0)
2021–2022	Politehnica Timișoara	5	(0)
2022–2023	CS Tunari	5	(0)
2023–2024	Rockdale Ilinden	19	(0)
2024–	Sydney FC	46	(0)
- * Club domestic league appearances and goals as of 24 December 2024

Harrison Devenish-Meares (born 26 October 1996) is an Australian soccer who plays as a goalkeeper for A-League Men club Sydney FC.

== Early and personal life ==
Devenish-Meares was born on 27 October 1996 in Sydney, Australia and raised in the Upper North Shore in Gordon. His mother, Rossana Devenish-Meares, is an ENT doctor while his father is an accountant. His mother was diagnosed with renal cell carcinoma after she collapsed at a homecoming party in 2021. His mother was cancer-free in 2025 and raised A$4,000 for Cancer Council after her recovery.

Devenish-Meares moved to Florida, United States in 2017 to study for a Bachelor of Biological Science at the University of South Florida. He graduated in 2019. Outside of soccer, he practises veganism. As a child, he supported Sydney FC, and Premier League club Tottenham Hotspur. He is of South American descent. He is humorously nicknamed "Sevenish Beers".

== Club career ==
=== Early career ===
Devenish-Meares started his career with Northern Tigers in NPL NSW 2. He played for both youth and senior squads and was on the bench when the club won the NPL NSW Men’s 2 Grand Final in 2015. He later made the move to the United States in July 2017 to train full-time with South Florida Bulls in the US College System. After he graduated from college soccer, Devenish-Meares signed a short-term contract with Portland Phoenix in the USL League Two. During the off-season, he had trials scheduled with clubs in the Major League Soccer (MLS), but used the break to look for trials in Romania.

Devenish-Meares had a stint with Bucharest United in the fourth tier of Romania while he trialed with Liga II club Rapid București from January 2020. At the time, Rapid had a FIFA-sanctioned transfer ban and delayed his signing until the summer in August. He joined on a one-year contract with the option to extend for another year. He is the second Australian to sign with the club since Ryan Griffiths in 2006. Until halfway of the 2020–21 season, Devenish-Meares was ineligible for squad selection due to issues with his work permit. He was available to play in January 2021. He left the club at the end of the season with no appearances made for the first-team. He made seven appearances for Rapid II in Liga III.

In July 2021, Devenish-Meares signed a two-year contract for Politehnica Timișoara in the same league as his former club. He kept a clean sheet in his professional debut on 22 September in a 1–0 win over Unirea Slobozia in the Romanian Cup. Politehnica finished with their worst season in Liga II and were relegated at the end of the season. In the 2022–23 season, Devenish-Meares played a season with CS Tunari in Liga III and took part in the club's promotion campaign. He signed for Rockdale Ilinden in NPL NSW while he was on trial at Sydney FC in 2023. Despite leaving mid-way of the 2024 season, Devenish-Meares was a member of the squad that won the premiership and the club's first in 40 years.

=== Sydney FC ===
In June 2024, Devenish-Meares signed for A-League Men club Sydney FC on a two-year deal. After first-choice goalkeeper Andrew Redmayne was ruled out with a concussion, Devenish-Meares made his debut in the first group stage match against Eastern SC in the AFC Champions League Two. He managed a clean sheet in the 5–0 win at home on 19 September. In his league debut on 8 December, Devenish-Meares was sent-off in the first-half of a 2–1 defeat to Central Coast Mariners. He served a one-match suspension. In January 2025, Devenish-Meares extended on a three-year contract with the club. At the end of the 2024–25 season, Devenish-Meares was nominated for the Save of the Year award.

During pre-season for the 2025–26 season, Devenish-Meares suffered an ankle syndesmosis before the cup match against Western United on 29 July. He underwent surgery the next month. He returned from injury for the opening league game against Adelaide United on 17 October. In the first Big Blue derby of the season, Devenish-Meares recorded his third clean sheet on 22 November in a 3–0 win to put Sydney FC top of the table. He kept his fifth clean sheet with nine saves in a goalless draw against Melbourne City on 3 January 2026. His sixth came eight days later in a 3–0 win against Macarthur FC. By end of March, Devenish-Meares recorded eight clean sheets in 21 appearances across all competitions for his side who fell down to fifth place. In his first game under new head coach Patrick Kisnorbo, he kept a ninth clean sheet in a goalless draw to Brisbane Roar on 2 April.

For finishing fifth in the regular season, Sydney FC faced Melbourne Victory for the first round of the final series. Devenish-Meares was named man of the match in the 1–0 elimination final win with six saves and a clean sheet. In a two-legged semi-final against Newcastle Jets, Devenish-Meares made two saves in the 4–2 shoot-out win, after the game tied 2–2 on aggregate, to qualify to the Grand Final. In the final on 23 May, he started in a 1–0 loss to Auckland FC. In the same month, Devenish-Meares was named captain in the A-League Men's Team of the Season, and was also named Goalkeeper of the Year with two nominations for Player of the Month and a total of 12 clean sheets during the season.

== Honours ==
Individual

- A-League Men Goalkeeper of the Year: 2025–26
- A-League Men Save of the Year: 2025–26
- A-League Men Team of the Year: 2025–26
