= Joe Lacey =

Australian soccer player (born 2007)

Personal information
- Date of birth: 22 June 2007 (age 19)
- Place of birth: Northern Beaches, New South Wales, Australia

Team information
- Current team: Sydney FC
- Number: 29

Senior career*
Years	Team	Apps	(Gls)
2023–	Sydney FC NPL	31	(3)
2023–	Sydney FC	2	(0)

International career
2025	Australia U20	1	(0)
2026–	Wales U19	2	(0)
- * Club domestic league appearances and goals as of 26 April 2026

Joseph Steven Colin Lacey (born 22 June 2007) is a professional soccer player who plays as a midfielder for A-League Men club Sydney FC. Born in Australia, he received one cap for the Australia under-20 national team before playing for the Wales under-19 national team.

== Early life ==
Lacey was born on Sydney's Northern Beaches. He is of Welsh descent on his mother's side, with his mother being from Pontypridd and his aunt living near Wrexham and working as a paramedic for EFL Championship club Wrexham, and English descent on his father's side, with his father being an award-winning potter from Brighton.

== Club career ==
Lacey began his career at Sydney FC Youth in the National Premier Leagues NSW (NPL NSW). He signed his first professional contract in 2023. Sydney FC's head coach Ufuk Talay described him as a "very technically gifted number 10" who "scores goals and is equally adept using both feet".

On 15 July 2025, Lacey, who is of Welsh descent, scored the winning goal for Sydney FC in a 2–1 comeback victory against newly-promoted EFL Championship side Wrexham in a friendly at Allianz Stadium in front of a sold-out crowd. Lacey's first competitive appearance for the club came six weeks later against Auckland FC in the quarter-finals of the 2025 Australia Cup.

== International career ==
Born in Australia to an English mother and a Welsh father, Lacey is eligible to represent either Australia, England or Wales at international level under FIFA eligibility rules.

In June 2026, Lacey was called up to the Wales under-19 squad.

== Career statistics ==
=== Club ===
As of 26 April 2026

Club	Season	League			Cup		Continental		Total	
Club	Season	Division	Apps	Goals	Apps	Goals	Apps	Goals	Apps	Goals
Sydney FC	2025–26	A-League Men	1	0	1	0	—		2	0
Career total			1	0	1	0	0	0	2	0
