= Tiago Quintal =

Australian soccer player

Personal information
- Date of birth: 16 June 2006 (age 20)
- Place of birth: Sydney, Australia
- Height: 1.76 m (5 ft 9 1/2 in)
- Position: Attacking midfielder

Team information
- Current team: Sydney FC

Youth career
- Baulkham Hills FC
- 2018–: Sydney FC

Senior career*
Years	Team	Apps	(Gls)
2022–2025	Sydney FC NPL	28	(9)
2024–	Sydney FC	41	(6)

International career^{‡}
2022–2023	Australia U17	7	(4)
2024–2025	Australia U20	16	(0)
2026–	Australia U23	1	(0)
Medal record
Men's football
Representing Australia
AFC U-20 Asian Cup
Winner	2025 China	Team
- * Club domestic league appearances and goals as of 26 April 2026 ‡ National team caps and goals as of 5 October 2025

Tiago Quintal (Portuguese: [tiˈaɣu kĩˈtal]; born 16 June 2006) is an Australian professional soccer player who plays as an attacking midfielder for A-League Men club Sydney FC.

== Early life ==
Quintal was born on 16 June 2006 in Sydney and raised in the suburb of Baulkham Hills to Portuguese and Italian parents. As a child, Quintal attended King Park Public School and Westfields Sports High School. He supported Premier League club Chelsea and idolised Eden Hazard and Adrian Mierzejewski. Quintal started playing soccer at Baulkham Hills FC and signed for the youth academy of Sydney FC at the age of 11. In March 2023, he went on a two-week trial at Lyon Academy in France.

== Club career ==
=== Sydney FC ===
==== 2024–25: Youth career and debut ====
Quintal played for the under-20 and first grade teams in the 2022 NPL NSW season and made his senior debut on 19 June against Sutherland Sharks. In the 2024 season, he scored a brace and his first goal of the season in a 2–0 win over Manly United on 23 February. He scored his third goal in a 4–1 win over Central Coast Mariners on 8 March. Two days later, Quintal featured for the first time in an A-League Men match as an unused substitute against Brisbane Roar. He scored once more with the youth team in the next NPL match against Western Sydney Wanderers on 15 March.

In April, Quintal signed his first professional contract on a three-year deal. After he scored a goal on his 18th birthday, Quintal scored his seventh in a 3–0 win in the returning fixture against the Wanderers. On 11 August, he registered two goals and two assists in a 5–1 win over APIA Leichhardt to move his side up to 15th on the table. In the final match of the season on 25 August, he recorded one assist in a 2–1 win over Sydney Olympic to help his side avoid relegation. At the 2024–25 season, he was included in the squad that played in the AFC Champions League Two. On 7 November, he made his professional debut against Sanfrecce Hiroshima in the fourth group stage match. On 18 January 2025, Quintal scored his first goal in the A-League in a 4–3 loss to Brisbane Roar.

==== 2025–27: Breakthrough seasons ====
The 2025–26 season saw Quintal make his breakthrough in the first-team. On 6 December, Quintal registered an assist in his first league start in a 2–1 win over Central Coast Mariners. He scored a brace in the Sydney Derby on 31 January 2026. In February, he managed two goals in four appearances with a goal each in the matches against Adelaide United (1–2), and Brisbane Roar (1–0). He scored his fifth goal in a 2–1 defeat to Newcastle Jets on 22 March. In the third derby clash against Western Sydney Wanderers, he recorded an assist in the 2–0 win at home. At the end of the regular season, Sydney finished fifth in the table. In the finals series, Quintal started in all three knockout matches leading to the Grand Final in Auckland, New Zealand. He started in the 1–0 final loss against Auckland FC on 23 May. In the same month, he was named the under-20 Player of the Year at the club's end of year ceremony.

In the 2026 Australia Cup, Quintal scored his first career hat-trick in a 5–1 first-round win over Bayswater City on 21 July. He became the youngest-ever player to score a hat-trick for Sydney FC, aged 20 years and 35 days. He scored his fourth goal of the campaign in a 4–2 win over Brisbane Roar in the Round of 16. Sydney FC were later knocked out in the semi-final by Melbourne Victory.

== International career ==
Quintal received his first international call-up with the Australian under-17 team ahead of the 2022 AFF U16 Youth Championship. He featured in all three matches and started in two of them. Quintal was recalled for the under-17 side ahead of the AFC U23 Asian Cup. He made two appearances as Australia reached the quarter-finals before being knocked out by Japan. He scored four goals during the qualification stage with two goals each in the matches against Northern Mariana Islands, and Cambodia.

== Style of play ==
Mainly positioned as an attacking midfielder, Quintal is described as having quick feet and awareness. He was described by then head coach Ufuk Talay as a creative player that "can play between the lines" and a good dribbler with a natural goal-scoring ability.

== Career statistics ==
As of 26 April 2026

Appearances and goals by club, season and competition
Club	Season	League			Domestic Cup		Continental		Total	
Club	Season	Division	Apps	Goals	Apps	Goals	Apps	Goals	Apps	Goals
Sydney FC NPL	2022	NPL NSW	4	0	—		—		4	0
Sydney FC NPL	2023	NPL NSW	1	0	—		—		1	0
Sydney FC NPL	2024	NPL NSW	23	9	—		—		23	9
Sydney FC NPL	2025	NPL NSW	7	1	—		—		1	1
Sydney FC NPL	Total		35	10	0	0	0	0	35	10
Sydney FC	2024–25	A-League Men	17	1	0	0	5	0	22	1
Sydney FC	2025–26	A-League Men	24	5	3	0	—		27	5
Sydney FC	Total		41	6	3	0	5	0	49	6
Career total			76	16	3	0	5	0	84	16

== Honours ==
Australia U-20

- AFC U-20 Asian Cup Champions: 2025
