= Mathias Macallister =

Australian soccer player (born 2007)

Personal information
- Full name: Mathias Langeland Macallister
- Date of birth: 12 April 2007 (age 19)
- Place of birth: Oslo, Norway
- Height: 1.81 m (5 ft 11 in)
- Position: Striker

Team information
- Current team: Sydney FC
- Number: 22

Youth career
- Avalon SC

Senior career*
| Years | Team | Apps | (Gls) |
| 2024– | Sydney FC NPL | 53 | (20) |
| 2025– | Sydney FC | 4 | (0) |

International career^{‡}
| 2025–2026 | Australia U20 | 4 | (1) |
| 2026– | Australia U23 | 4 | (2) |
- * Club domestic league appearances and goals as of 16:31, 24 September 2026 (UTC) ‡ National team caps and goals as of 16:31, 24 September 2026 (UTC)

Mathias Langeland Macallister (born 12 April 2007) is an Australian professional footballer who plays as a striker for A-League Men club Sydney FC.

== Early life ==
Macallister was born in Oslo, Norway. He is the son of Dylan Macallister, a former professional footballer.

== Club career ==
Macallister made his senior debut for Sydney FC against Bangkok United in the Round of 16 2nd leg in the 2024–25 AFC Champions League Two.
