= Piero Quispe =

Peruvian footballer (born 2001)

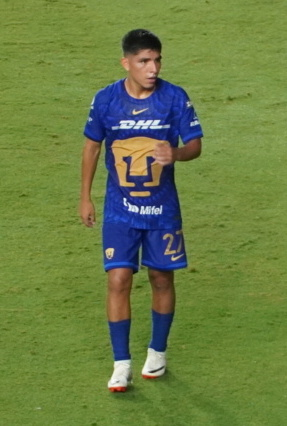

Personal information
- Full name: Piero Aldair Quispe Córdova
- Date of birth: 14 August 2001 (age 25)
- Place of birth: Lima, Peru
- Height: 1.68 m (5 ft 6 in)
- Position: Midfielder

Team information
- Current team: Universitario de Deportes

Youth career
- 2014–2017: CD Hector Chumpitaz
- 2017–2021: Universitario de Deportes

Senior career*
Years	Team	Apps	(Gls)
2021–2023	Universitario de Deportes	78	(9)
2024–2026	UNAM	58	(5)
2025–2026	→ Sydney FC (loan)	28	(2)
2026–	Universitario de Deportes	0	(0)

International career^{‡}
2022–	Peru	12	(1)
- * Club domestic league appearances and goals as of 26 April 2026 ‡ National team caps and goals as of 19 November 2024

Piero Aldair Quispe Córdova (Spanish: [ˈpjeɾo alˈdajɾ ˈkispe ˈkoɾðoβa]; born 14 August 2001) is a Peruvian professional footballer who plays as a midfielder for Liga 1 club Universitario de Deportes and the Peru national team.

== Club career ==
=== Universitario de Deportes ===
A youth product of CD Hector Chumpitaz, Quispe played the 2017 Copa Peru at the District Stage in the Los Olivos League, before moving to the youth academy of Universitario de Deportes in the same year. He was promoted to the club reserves in 2019, scoring three goals in the 2019 Torneo de Promoción y Reserva.

Quispe began his senior career with Universitario in 2021, playing in the Peruvian Liga 1, making his professional debut in March, in a 3–1 defeat against Academia Cantolao. In July 2021, he scored his first professional goal with la U in the opening match of the season of Liga 1's Fase 2 in a 2–2 draw against Alianza Atlético. Following an injury to teammate Hernán Novick after the Peruvian Clásico against Alianza Lima, manager Gregorio Pérez gave Quispe an opportunity, and he stood out in a 4–0 victory against Alianza Universidad he would score his second professional goal playing as a starter in the next match, a 3–1 victory against Sport Huancayo.

He played in the second qualifying stage of the 2022 Copa Libertadores with Universitario against Barcelona de Guayaquil, but the team ended up losing both home and away matches and was eliminated from the tournament. In April 2022, Quispe signed a contract tying him with the club until 2025. In that year's season, he was the Universitario player with the most appearances (35).

In the 2023 Copa Sudamericana first stage match against Cienciano, Quispe scored the first goal in a 2–0 victory which allowed los cremas to proceed to the group stage of the tournament. He played a leading role and scored the winning goal in a 1–0 victory against Gimnasia de La Plata in the last matchday; this triumph helped Universitario advance to the knockout round play-offs. Universitario was eliminated from the tournament by Corinthians in those play-offs, with Quispe being one of the few players to stand out in the return home game. In October 2023, after a 2–0 victory against Sport Huancayo, Universitario won the Clausura phase of the 2023 Liga 1, with Quispe being chosen as the best player of said phase. In November, the team won the national title after defeating Alianza Lima 3–1 on aggregate in the finals. In December, he was chosen as the best player of the season amid rumours of his departure from both Universitario and the Liga 1.

=== UNAM ===
On 27 December 2023, Mexican club UNAM announced the signing of Quispe on a permanent deal, starting from the 2024 Clausura season. He scored his first goal with Pumas on matchday 15 of the 2024 Torneo Clausura, in a 1–0 victory against León. During the 2024 Torneo Apertura, Quispe became a regular starter for Pumas and scored in the 0–1 victory against Club América in the Clásico Capitalino.

==== Loan to Sydney FC ====
On 3 September 2025, Quispe joined Australian side Sydney FC on loan for the 2025–26 season; with the club having the option to sign him on a permanent basis at the end of the season. He became the first Peruvian to join a A-League Men club. His debut for the club was in the opening round of the A-League Menseason, against Adelaide United at Coopers Stadium on 17 October 2025. On 11 January 2026, Quispe would score his first goal for Sydney in a 3–0 win against Macarthur FC.

== International career ==
Quispe debuted with the Peru national team in a 1–0 friendly win over Bolivia on 19 November 2022. In November 2023, he played his first official match against Bolivia in a 0–2 away defeat, being considered one of the few Peruvian players that stood out. Quispe would score his first international goal in a friendly against the Dominican Republic. In October 2024, he made an assist for a Miguel Araujo goal in a 1–0 win against Uruguay, giving Peru its first victory in the 2026 CONMEBOL World Cup qualification.

== Personal life ==
Quispe was born in the Naranjal neighborhood in San Martin de Porres District, in Lima. He has one daughter with his girlfriend Cielo Berrios.

== Career statistics ==
=== Club ===
As of 26 April 2026

Appearances and goals by club, season and competition
Club	Season	League			Cup		Continental		Other		Total	
Club	Season	Division	Apps	Goals	Apps	Goals	Apps	Goals	Apps	Goals	Apps	Goals
Universitario de Deportes	2021	Liga 1	9	2	0	0	0	0	—		9	2
Universitario de Deportes	2022	Liga 1	35	3	0	0	2	0	—		37	3
Universitario de Deportes	2023	Liga 1	34	4	0	0	8	2	—		42	6
Universitario de Deportes	Total		78	9	0	0	10	2	0	0	88	11
UNAM	2023–24	Liga MX	17	1	0	0	0	0	0	0	17	1
UNAM	2024–25	Liga MX	35	4	0	0	6	0	4	0	42	4
UNAM	2025–26	Liga MX	6	0	0	0	0	0	3	0	9	0
UNAM	Total		58	5	0	0	6	0	7	0	69	5
Sydney FC (loan)	2025–26	A-League Men	26	1	0	0	—		—		26	1
Career total			162	15	0	0	16	2	7	0	183	17

=== International ===
As of 19 November 2024.

Peru
Year	Apps	Goals
2022	1	0
2023	2	0
2024	9	1
Total	12	1

International goals

As of match played 26 March 2024. Scores and results list Peru's goal tally first.

No.	Date	Venue	Opponent	Score	Result	Competition
1	26 March 2024	Estadio Monumental "U", Lima, Peru	Dominican Republic	3–0	4–1	Friendly

== Honours ==
Universitario de Deportes

- Peruvian Liga 1: 2023

Individual

- Peruvian Liga 1 Team of the Year: 2023
- Peruvian Liga 1 Player of the Year: 2023
