= Rhys Youlley =

Australian soccer player

Personal information
- Full name: Rhys Marlon Youlley
- Date of birth: February 13, 2005 (age 21)
- Place of birth: Sydney, Australia
- Height: 1.84 m (6 ft 0 in)
- Position: Central midfielder

Team information
- Current team: Sydney FC
- Number: 36

Youth career
- 2016–2018: Sydney FC
- 2018–2022: Western Sydney Wanderers
- 2022–2023: Macarthur FC
- 2023–2025: Westerlo

Senior career*
Years	Team	Apps	(Gls)
2022–2023	Bulls FC Academy	27	(2)
2022–2023	Macarthur FC	1	(0)
2023–2025	Westerlo	5	(0)
2025–	Sydney FC	22	(0)

International career^{‡}
2023	Australia U18	3	(0)
2023–2025	Australia U20	10	(1)
2024	Australia U23	4	(0)
- * Club domestic league appearances and goals as of 23 May 2026 ‡ National team caps and goals as of 5 October 2025

Rhys Marlon Youlley is an Australian professional soccer player who plays as a central midfielder for Sydney FC in the A-League Men.

== Early life ==
Rhys grew up in Sydney and played football from a young age, often going along to watch his older brother Liam play matches before he could join a team himself.

In 2016 he joined the Sydney FC Academy as a 12 year old, before moving to Western Sydney Wanderers Academy in 2018.

== Club career ==
=== Macarthur FC ===
From his time at the Western Sydney Wanderers Academy, Youlley made the move to Macarthur FC where he made his A-League debut in a 1–0 loss to Newcastle Jets, coming on as a 79th-minute substitute in February 2023. He continued to play for the Bulls Academy team before earning himself a move to Belgium.

=== Westerlo ===
Youlley joined Belgian side Westerlo in 2023 with his previous employer Macarthur granting him the opportunity to pursue his football career overseas. Youlley initially played in the youth team upon arrival before making his first team debut in a defeat to R.S.C. Anderlecht in the Croky Cup on 5 December 2024.

He made his league debut on 9 February 2025, at home against Standard Liege and continued to feature off the bench at the back end of the campaign for his side.

=== Sydney FC ===
Youlley returned to Australia, signing a 3-year contract with Sydney FC on 30 May 2025.

== International career ==
=== Youth ===
Youlley has represented Australia on more than one occasion in the youth set ups, moving his way through the ranks of the U18's, U20's and U23 sides. He has featured at a number of major youth tournaments, including the 2024 AFC U-23 Asian Cup, and the 2025 FIFA U-20 World Cup.

== Career statistics ==
As of 18 August 2026

Club	Season	League			Cup		Continental		Total	
Club	Season	Division	Apps	Goals	Apps	Goals	Apps	Goals	Apps	Goals
Macarthur FC	2022–23	A-League Men	1	0	0	0	—		1	0
Macarthur FC	2023–24	A-League Men	0	0	2	0	—		2	0
Macarthur FC	Total		1	0	2	0	0	0	3	0
Westerlo	2023–24	Belgian Pro League	0	0	0	0	—		0	0
Westerlo	2024–25	Belgian Pro League	5	0	1	0	—		6	0
Westerlo	Total		5	0	1	0	0	0	6	0
Sydney FC	2024–25	A-League Men	0	0	3	1	—		3	1
Sydney FC	2025–26	A-League Men	22	0	3	0	—		25	0
Sydney FC	Career total		28	0	12	1	0	0	37	1
