= Gus Hoefsloot =

Australian professional footballer

Personal information
- Full name: Gus Hoefsloot
- Date of birth: 13 March 2006 (age 20)
- Place of birth: Sydney, New South Wales, Australia
- Position: Goalkeeper

Team information
- Current team: Sydney FC
- Number: 1

Youth career
- Helensburgh Thistles SC
- 2019–2023: Sydney FC

Senior career*
Years	Team	Apps	(Gls)
2022–	Sydney FC NPL	9	(0)
2023–	Sydney FC	0	(0)

International career^{‡}
2023–	Australia U17	1	(0)
Medal record
Men's football
Representing Australia
AFC U-20 Asian Cup
Winner	2025 China	Team
- * Club domestic league appearances and goals as of 26 April 2026 ‡ National team caps and goals as of 2 July 2023

Gus Hoefsloot (/ˈhuːfsloʊt/ HOOF-sloht, Dutch: [ˈɦufsloːt]; born 13 March 2006) is an Australian professional footballer who plays as a goalkeeper for Sydney FC.

== Early life ==
Born to Dutch parents, Hoefsloot was raised in Stanwell Park and joined the Sydney FC Academy in 2019 as a 12-year-old. He grew up playing futsal for South Coast Taipans.

== Career ==
=== Sydney FC NPL ===
Hoefsloot made his debut for Sydney FC's NPL side on 2 April 2022, in a 4–3 win over Sutherland Sharks, at the age of 16.

=== Sydney FC ===
On 28 June 2023, Sydney FC announced it had promoted Hoefsloot to its A-League Men's squad, signing him to a three-year scholarship contract. He had previously trialled with French side Olympique Lyonnais and had attracted interest from overseas clubs before signing. In May 2025, Hoefsloot signed a new professional three-year contract and was given the #1 jersey, following the departure of Andrew Redmayne. His debut for the club would be in a 1–0 win over Western United in the Australia Cup.

== International career ==
Hoefsloot was named in the Australia men's national under-17 soccer team for the 2022 AFF U-16 Youth Championship. He made his first and only appearance for the team in a 4–2 loss to Cambodia.

He is also eligible to represent Netherlands.

== Career statistics ==
As of match played 26 April 2026

Club	Season	League			National Cup		Continental		Total	
Club	Season	Division	Apps	Goals	Apps	Goals	Apps	Goals	Apps	Goals
Sydney FC	2023–24	A-League Men	0	0	0	0	—		0	0
Sydney FC	2024–25	A-League Men	0	0	0	0	0	0	0	0
Sydney FC	2025–26	A-League Men	0	0	3	0	—		3	0
Sydney FC	Total		0	0	3	0	0	0	3	0
Career total			0	0	3	0	0	0	3	0

== Honours ==
Australia U-20

- AFC U-20 Asian Cup Champions: 2025
