= Wataru Kamijo =

Australian-Japanese footballer (born 2006)

Personal information
- Date of birth: 17 April 2006 (age 20)
- Place of birth: Nagoya, Japan
- Height: 1.78 m (5 ft 10 in)
- Position: Defensive midfielder

Team information
- Current team: Sydney FC
- Number: 8

Youth career
- 2020–2023: Western Sydney Wanderers
- 2023–2024: Sydney FC

Senior career*
Years	Team	Apps	(Gls)
2023	Sydney FC NPL	6	(0)
2023–	Sydney FC	19	(0)

International career^{‡}
2023	Australia U17	1	(1)
2025–2026	Australia U20	2	(0)
- * Club domestic league appearances and goals as of 26 April 2026 ‡ National team caps and goals as of 10 June 2025

Wataru Kamijō

Korean name
- Hangul: 카미조 와타루
Transcriptions
- Revised Romanization: Kamijo Wataru

Japanese name
- Kanji: 上條 航
Transcriptions
- Romanization: Kamijō Wataru

Wataru Kamijō (/wəˈtɑːruː kəˈmiːdʒoʊ/ wə-TAR-oo kə-MEE-joh; (Note: Japanese: 上條 航, romanized: Kamijō Wataru, pronounced [kamidʑoː ɰataɾɯ]; Korean: 카미조 와타루, romanized: Kamijo Wataru, pronounced [kʰamidʑo watʰaɾu].) born 17 April 2006) is a professional soccer player who plays as a defensive midfielder for A-League Men club Sydney FC. Born in Japan, he has represented Australia at under-17 and under-20 level.

== Early life ==
Kamijo was born on 17 April 2006 in Nagoya, Japan, to a Korean mother and a Japanese father. Growing up, he attended elementary school in South Korea for one year.

== Club career ==
=== Sydney FC ===
Kamijo was promoted to Sydney FC's first team in the 2023–24 A-League Men season. He made his debut for the club in a 4–1 win over Philippine side Kaya–Iloilo in Manila in the group stage of the AFC Champions League Two on 3 October 2024. At the end of the 2024–25 season Kamijo was named as the clubs U20 player of the year.

On 11 June 2025, Kamijo signed a four-year contract extension, keeping him with the Sky Blues until the end of the 2028–29 season.

== Career statistics ==
As of match played 26 April 2026

Club	Season	League			Cup		Continental		Other		Total	
Club	Season	Division	Apps	Goals	Apps	Goals	Apps	Goals	Apps	Goals	Apps	Goals
Sydney FC	2024–25	A-League Men	8	0	0	0	5	0	0	0	13	0
Sydney FC	2025–26	A-League Men	11	0	2	0	—		0	0	13	0
Career total			19	0	2	0	5	0	0	0	26	0

== Honours ==
=== Individual ===
- Sydney FC Under 20 Player of the Year: 2025
