= 2025–26 Newcastle Jets FC season =

Newcastle Jets
2025–26 season
- Owner: Maverick Sports Partners (100%)
- Chairman: Maurice Bisetto
- Head Coach: Mark Milligan
- Stadium: McDonald Jones Stadium
- A-League Men: 1st - Premiers
- A-League Men Finals: Semi-final
- Australia Cup: Winners
- Top goalscorer: League: Clayton Taylor (9 goals); All: Eli Adams (10 goals)
- Highest home attendance: 25,082 vs. Sydney FC (16 May 2026); A League Men
- Lowest home attendance: 3,728 vs. Melbourne City (6 December 2025); A League Men
- Average home league attendance: 9,496
- Biggest win: 5–0 vs. Cooks Hill United (A) (13 August 2025); Australia Cup
- Biggest defeat: 1–4 vs. Sydney FC (H) (1 November 2025); A-League Men; 0–3 vs. Brisbane Roar (A) (9 November 2025); A-League Men
Home colours	Away colours	Third colours
- All statistics correct as of 24 May 2026.

The 2025–26 season was the Newcastle Jets Football Club's 25th season since its establishment in 2000. Newcastle Jets participated in the A-League Men for the 21st season, and in the Australia Cup for the tenth time.

== Players ==
Note: Flags indicate national team as defined under FIFA eligibility rules; some limited exceptions apply. Players may hold more than one non-FIFA nationality.

No.	Pos.	Nation	Player
1	GK	AUS	James Delianov
5	DF	IRL	Joe Shaughnessy
7	MF	AUS	Eli Adams
8	MF	NZL	Lachlan Bayliss
9	FW	AUS	Lachlan Rose
10	MF	ENG	Zach Clough
11	FW	AUS	Ben Gibson
13	FW	AUS	Clayton Taylor
14	MF	AUS	Max Burgess
17	MF	AUS	Kosta Grozos (captain)
18	MF	JPN	Kota Mizunuma
19	FW	AUS	Alexander Badolato
20	GK	AUS	Alex Nassiep (scholarship)
21	GK	AUS	Noah James

No.	Pos.	Nation	Player
22	DF	AUS	Joel Bertolissio
23	DF	AUS	Daniel Wilmering
24	MF	AUS	Alex Nunes (scholarship)
25	MF	AUS	Oscar Fryer (scholarship)
28	MF	AUS	Will Dobson
33	DF	AUS	Mark Natta
34	DF	AUS	Richard Nkomo (scholarship)
39	DF	AUS	Thomas Aquilina
41	MF	MLT	Lucas Scicluna (scholarship)
42	DF	AUS	Max Cooper (scholarship)
43	FW	AUS	Xavier Bertoncello (scholarship)
44	DF	AUS	Ben van Dorssen (scholarship)
45	MF	AUS	Christian Bracco (scholarship)

== Transfers and contracts ==
=== Transfers in ===
No.	Position	Name	From	Type/fee	Contract length	Date	Ref.
66	GK	Zac Bowling	(Australia) Blacktown City	End of loan		30 June 2025	
19	FW	Alexander Badolato	Western Sydney Wanderers	Free transfer	2 years	1 July 2025	
14	MF	Max Burgess	Sydney FC	Free transfer	2 years	1 July 2025	
5	DF	(Republic of Ireland) Joe Shaughnessy	(Scotland) Dundee	Free transfer	2 years	9 July 2025	
1	GK	James Delianov	Adelaide United	Free transfer	2 years	16 July 2025	
22	DF	Joel Bertolissio	(Australia) APIA Leichhardt	Free transfer	1 year	8 August 2025	
34	DF	Richard Nkomo	Western Sydney Wanderers NPL	Free transfer	1 year scholarship	19 September 2025	
20	GK	Alex Nassiep	Unattached	Free transfer	1 year scholarship	29 September 2025	
10	FW	(England) Zach Clough	(Malaysia) Selangor	Free transfer	2.5 years	14 January 2026	

==== From youth squad ====
N	Pos.	Nat.	Name	Age	Notes
43	FW	(Australia)	Xavier Bertoncello	20	1-year scholarship
41	MF	(Malta)	Lucas Scicluna	19	1-year scholarship
45	MF	(Australia)	Christian Bracco	21	1-year scholarship
42	DF	(Australia)	Max Cooper	18	Multi-year scholarship

=== Transfers out ===
No.	Position	Name	To	Type/fee	Date	Ref.
14	DF	(New Zealand) Dane Ingham	(Malaysia) Sabah	End of contract	15 June 2025	
1	GK	Ryan Scott	(Australia) Preston Lions	End of contract	25 June 2025	
4	DF	Phillip Cancar	Western Sydney Wanderers	Mutual contract termination	30 June 2025	
6	MF	Matthew Scarcella	Sydney FC	End of loan	30 June 2025	
10	FW	(Brazil) Wellissol	Unattached	End of contract	30 June 2025	
11	MF	Jacob Dowse	Retired	End of contract	30 June 2025	
19	MF	Callum Timmins	Perth Glory	End of contract	30 June 2025	
20	MF	(Tanzania) Charles M'Mombwa	(Malta) Floriana	End of contract	30 June 2025	
29	FW	Justin Vidic	Unattached	End of contract	30 June 2025	
66	GK	Zac Bowling	Unattached	End of contract	30 June 2025	
15	DF	Aleksandar Šušnjar	(Uzbekistan) Lokomotiv Tashkent	Mutual contract termination	22 December 2025	

=== Contract extensions ===
No.	Name	Position	Duration	Date	Notes
18	(Japan) Kota Mizunuma	Winger	1 year	12 June 2025	
23	Daniel Wilmering	Left-back	2 years	16 June 2025	
28	Will Dobson	Midfielder	2 years	6 November 2025	Contract extended from end of 2025–26 to end of 2027–28
22	Joel Bertolissio	Right-back	2 years	25 February 2026	Contract extended from end of 2025–26 to end of 2027–28
43	Xavier Bertoncello	Winger	2 years	26 February 2026	Contract extended from end of 2025–26 to end of 2027–28

== Pre-season and friendlies ==
19 July 2025	St George FC (Australia)	1–4	(Australia) Newcastle Jets	Sydney, Australia
	Macarthur 59'	Report	Bertoncello 14'; Cockle 37'; Burgess 42' (pen.); Mizunuma 71'	Stadium: Barton Park

22 July 2025	Edgeworth FC (Australia)	0–3	(Australia) Newcastle Jets	Newcastle, Australia
19:00 AEST		Report	Mizunuma (?); Wilmering 55'	Stadium: Jack McLaughlan Oval

9 August 2025	Newcastle Jets (Australia)	1–3	(Australia) Brisbane Roar	Lismore, Australia
15:00 AEST	Bouzanis 61' (o.g.)	Report	Ruhs 20', 35'; Hore 46'	Stadium: Oakes Oval

19 August 2025	Western Sydney Wanderers (Australia)	1–1	(Australia) Newcastle Jets	Sydney, Australia
	Barbarouses	Report	Fryer	Stadium: Wanderers Football Park; Attendance: 0 (behind closed doors)

11 September 2025	Sydney FC (Australia)	2–2	(Australia) Newcastle Jets	Sydney
	Wood; Macallister	Report	Rose; ?	Stadium: Valentine Sports Park; Attendance: 0 (behind closed doors)

20 September 2025	Northern NSW All-Stars (Australia)	0–4	(Australia) Newcastle Jets	Newcastle, Australia
17:00 AEST		Report	Fryer 49'; Rose 56' (pen.), 66'; Bertoncello 81'	Stadium: Darling Street Oval

23 September 2025	Melbourne City (Australia)	3–2	(Australia) Newcastle Jets	Melbourne
	Durakovic 17'; Rahmani 21'; Behich	Report	Bertoncello 45'; Burgess 67'	Stadium: City Football Academy; Attendance: 0 (behind closed doors)

== Competitions ==
=== Overall record ===
Competition	First match	Last match	Starting round	Final position	Record							
Competition	First match	Last match	Starting round	Final position	Pld	W	D	L	GF	GA	GD	Win %
A-League Men	19 October 2025	25 April 2026	Matchday 1	Winners	26	15	3	8	55	39	+16	57.69
A-League Men finals series	9 May	16 May	Semi-finals	Semi finals	2	0	2	0	2	2	+0	0.00
Australia Cup	30 July 2025	4 October 2025	Round of 32	Winners	5	5	0	0	17	4	+13	100.00
Total					33	20	5	8	74	45	+29	60.61

Last updated: 16 May 2026
Source: Competitions

=== A-League Men ===
==== League table ====
Pos	Team	Pld	W	D	L	GF	GA	GD	Pts	Qualification
1	Newcastle Jets	26	15	3	8	55	39	+16	48	Qualification for the AFC Champions League Elite league stage and the finals series (Note: The top two teams enter the finals series at the semi-finals, while the teams ranked third to sixth enter the finals series at the elimination-finals.)
2	Adelaide United	26	12	7	7	46	36	+10	43	Qualification for the AFC Champions League Elite preliminary stage and the finals series
3	Auckland FC (Note: Auckland FC and Wellington Phoenix cannot qualify for Asian Football Confederation competitions as they are based in New Zealand, which is part of the Oceania Football Confederation.) (C)	26	11	9	6	42	29	+13	42	Qualification for the finals series
4	Melbourne Victory	26	11	7	8	44	33	+11	40	Qualification for the AFC Champions League Two group stage and the finals series (Note: Since the 2025 Australia Cup winners, Newcastle Jets, occupy an AFC Champions League Elite position, the AFC Champions League Two spot goes to the next eligible team. The AFC ruled that the Australia Cup runner-up Heidelberg United was ineligible to compete.)
5	Sydney FC	26	11	6	9	33	25	+8	39	Qualification for the finals series

Source: A-Leagues
Rules for classification: 1) points; 2) goal difference; 3) goals scored; 4) wins; 5) head-to-head results; 5a) head-to-head points; 5b) head-to-head goal difference; 6) Fair Play points; 7) away goal difference; 8) away goals per match; 9) home goal difference; 10) home goals per match; 11) toss of a coin in an event of a tie of two clubs.
(C) Champions

==== Results summary ====
Overall								Home						Away					
Pld	W	D	L	GF	GA	GD	Pts	W	D	L	GF	GA	GD	W	D	L	GF	GA	GD
26	15	3	8	55	39	+16	48	7	1	5	30	20	+10	8	2	3	25	19	+6

Last updated: 25 April 2025.
Source: Ultimate A-League

==== Results by round ====
Round	1	2	3	4	5	6	7	8	9	10	11	12	13	14	15	16	17	18	19	20	21	22	23	24	25	26
Ground	A	H	H	A	H	A	H	A	H	H	A	A	A	H	H	A	A	H	A	H	H	A	A	H	A	H
Result	L	W	L	L	L	W	L	W	W	L	W	W	W	W	W	W	W	W	D	W	L	W	L	D	D	W
Position	10	5	9	10	12	11	11	8	6	9	6	4	3	2	1	1	1	1	1	1	1	1	1	1	1	1
Points	0	3	3	3	3	6	6	9	12	12	15	18	21	24	27	30	33	36	37	40	40	43	43	44	45	48

Updated to match(es) played on 25 April 2026. Source: Ultimate A-League
A = Away; H = Home; N = Neutral; B = Bye; W = Win; D = Draw; L = Loss; X = Bye

==== Matches ====
Win Draw Loss Fixtures

19 October 2025 1	Central Coast Mariners	3–2	Newcastle Jets	Gosford
15:00 AEDT	McCalmont 28' (pen.); Di Pizio 30'; Duarte 90+8'	Report	Badolato 14'; Rose 80'	Stadium: polytec Stadium; Attendance: 8,002; Referee: Shaun Evans

24 October 2025 2	Newcastle Jets	5–2	Melbourne Victory	Newcastle
19:35 AEDT	Gibson 14'; Badolato 20', 45+1', 79'; Fryer 90+2'	Report	Genreau 25'; Jelacic 55'	Stadium: McDonald Jones Stadium; Attendance: 6,137; Referee: Adam Kersey

1 November 2025 3	Newcastle Jets	1–4	Sydney FC	Newcastle
17:00 AEDT	Gibson 8'	Report	Toure 11', 51', 58'; Wood 74'	Stadium: McDonald Jones Stadium; Attendance: 7,815; Referee: Shane Skinner

9 November 2025 4	Brisbane Roar	3–0	Newcastle Jets	Bokarina
16:00 AEST	Herrington 31'; O'Shea 79' (pen.); Delianov 89' (o.g.)	Report		Stadium: Sunshine Coast Stadium; Attendance: 7,122; Referee: Alireza Faghani

23 November 2025 5	Newcastle Jets	1–2	Perth Glory	Newcastle
17:00 AEDT	Bertoncello 15'	Report	Lawrence 38'; Pennington 79' (pen.)	Stadium: McDonald Jones Stadium; Attendance: 5,578; Referee: Nathan Shakespear

30 November 2025 6	Auckland FC	1–2	Newcastle Jets	Auckland
15:00 NZDT	Verstraete 14'	Report	Dobson 3'; Rose 41'	Stadium: Go Media Stadium; Attendance: 10,837; Referee: Alireza Faghani

6 December 2025 7	Newcastle Jets	0–1	Melbourne City	Newcastle
17:00 AEDT		Report	Rahmani 27'	Stadium: McDonald Jones Stadium; Attendance: 3,728; Referee: Tim Danaskos

14 December 2025 8	Wellington Phoenix	1–3	Newcastle Jets	Wellington
15:00 NZDT	Eze 69'	Report	Adams 50'; Rose 54'; Taylor 57'	Stadium: Sky Stadium; Attendance: 3,030; Referee: Alex King

20 December 2025 9	Newcastle Jets	2–0	Sydney FC	Newcastle
17:00 AEDT	Dobson 66'; Bertoncello 84'	Report		Stadium: McDonald Jones Stadium; Attendance: 5,587; Referee: Lachlan Keevers

26 December 2025 10	Newcastle Jets	4–5	Macarthur FC	Newcastle
19:35 AEDT	Adams 42'; Taylor 48'; Bertoncello 75'; Gibson 83'	Report	Bernardo 15'; Bosnjak 45+1', 50'; Sawyer 68'; Vickery 90+6'	Stadium: McDonald Jones Stadium; Attendance: 5,307; Referee: Sam Kelly

1 January 2026 11	Auckland FC	1–3	Newcastle Jets	Auckland
17:00 NZDT	Randall 13'	Report	Rose 7', 90+6'; Dobson 16'	Stadium: Go Media Stadium; Attendance: 16,156; Referee: Daniel Elder

11 January 2026 12	Melbourne City	0–1	Newcastle Jets	Melbourne
17:00 AEDT		Report	Rose 67'	Stadium: AAMI Park; Attendance: 5,288; Referee: Casey Reibelt

17 January 2026 13	Western Sydney Wanderers	1–2	Newcastle Jets	Sydney
17:00 AEDT	Lual 83'	Report	Shaughnessy 15'; Adams 38'	Stadium: CommBank Stadium; Attendance: 5,243; Referee: Alireza Faghani

23 January 2026 14	Newcastle Jets	4–1	Wellington Phoenix	Newcastle
19:35 AEDT	Bayliss 1'; Taylor 56'; Adams 70'; Bertoncello 89'	Report	Kartum 86'	Stadium: McDonald Jones Stadium; Attendance: 8,207; Referee: Declan Woods

31 January 2026 15	Newcastle Jets	4–1	Brisbane Roar	Newcastle
17:00 AEDT	Rose 18' (pen.); Taylor 52'; Bayliss 64', 90+1'	Report	Valkanis 62'	Stadium: McDonald Jones Stadium; Attendance: 12,162; Referee: Alex King

8 February 2026 16	Adelaide United	2–3	Newcastle Jets	Adelaide
16:30 ACDT	Muñiz 53'; Dukuly 64'	Report	Taylor 45+2', 51', 72'	Stadium: Coopers Stadium; Attendance: 9,839; Referee: Jonathan Barreiro

13 February 2026 17	Perth Glory	1–3	Newcastle Jets	Perth
18:45 AWT	Colakovski 90+1'	Report	Bayliss 15'; Rose 47'; Bertoncello 81'	Stadium: HBF Park; Attendance: 7,177; Referee: Lachlan Keevers

22 February 2026 18	Newcastle Jets	1–0	Macarthur FC	Newcastle
18:00 AEDT	Bayliss 54'	Report		Stadium: McDonald Jones Stadium; Attendance: 14,035; Referee: Ben Abraham

28 February 2026 19	Central Coast Mariners	0–0	Newcastle Jets	Gosford
17:00 AEDT		Report		Stadium: polytec Stadium; Attendance: 9,033; Referee: Lachlan Keevers

7 March 2026 20	Newcastle Jets	2–1	Western Sydney Wanderers	Newcastle
17:00 AEDT	Adams 47'; Natta 77'	Report	Kraev 20'	Stadium: McDonald Jones Stadium; Attendance: 10,995; Referee: Adam Kersey

14 March 2026 21	Newcastle Jets	1–2	Auckland FC	Newcastle
17:00 AEDT	Taylor 28'	Report	Cosgrove 15', 52'	Stadium: McDonald Jones Stadium; Attendance: 12,014; Referee: Alex King

22 March 2026 22	Sydney FC	1–2	Newcastle Jets	Sydney
15:00 AEDT	Quintal 68'	Report	Mizunuma 32'; Gibson 90+3'	Stadium: Allianz Stadium; Attendance: 10,159; Referee: Adam Kersey

2 April 2026 23	Macarthur FC	3–2	Newcastle Jets	Sydney
19:35 AEDT	Duke 10', 68'; Durán 23'	Report	Bertoncello 13', 45+5'	Stadium: Campbelltown Sports Stadium; Attendance: 3,621; Referee: Shane Skinner

11 April 2026 24	Newcastle Jets	1–1	Adelaide United	Newcastle
15:00 AEST	Wilmering 90+4'	Report	White 73'	Stadium: McDonald Jones Stadium; Attendance: 10,959; Referee: Adam Kersey

17 April 2026 25	Melbourne Victory	2–2	Newcastle Jets	Melbourne
19:35 AEST	Nduka 31', 34'	Report	Adams 19', 89' (pen.)	Stadium: AAMI Park; Attendance: 8,762; Referee: Alex King

25 April 2026 26	Newcastle Jets	4–0	Central Coast Mariners	Newcastle
17:00 AEST	Dobson 21'; Taylor 25'; Adams 44'; Mizunuma 85'	Report		Stadium: McDonald Jones Stadium; Attendance: 20,930; Referee: Calvin Berg

==== Finals series ====
9 May 2026 Semi-finals first leg	Sydney FC	1–1	Newcastle Jets	Sydney
19:40 AEST	Stamatelopoulos 50'	Report	Adams 58'	Stadium: Allianz Stadium; Attendance: 17,771; Referee: Daniel Elder

16 May 2026 Semi-finals second leg	Newcastle Jets	1–1 (a.e.t.) (2–4 p)	Sydney FC	Newcastle
19:40 AEST	Adams 90+5'	Report	Quispe 63'	Stadium: McDonald Jones Stadium; Attendance: 25,082; Referee: Shaun Evans
	Penalties
	Grozos (penalty missed); Mizunuma (penalty scored); Gibson (penalty scored); Bertoncello (penalty missed)		Lolley (penalty missed); Youlley (penalty scored); Campuzano (penalty scored); R. Grant (penalty scored); Garuccio (penalty scored)

=== Australia Cup ===
30 July 2025 Round of 32	Newcastle Jets	2–1	Adelaide United	Maitland
19:30 AEST	Gibson 31'; Badolato 48'	Report	Mauk 15'	Stadium: Maitland Sportsground; Attendance: 2,167; Referee: Joshua Attard

13 August 2025 Round of 16	Cooks Hill United	0–5	Newcastle Jets	Newcastle
19:30 AEST		Source	Wilmering 20', 86'; Bertoncello 41'; Mizunuma 53'; Gibson 56'	Stadium: No.2 Sportsground; Attendance: 4,256; Referee: Matt Staples

24 August 2025 Quarter-final	Newcastle Jets	3–0	Macarthur FC	Maitland
16:00 AEST	Burgess 18'; Dobson 73'; Mizunuma 77'	Report		Stadium: Maitland Sportsground; Attendance: 2,579; Referee: Tim Danaskos

31 August 2025 Semi-final	Avondale FC	2–4	Newcastle Jets	Melbourne
15:00 AEST	Tevere 32', 57' (pen.)	Report	Bertoncello 6'; Mizunuma 16'; Adams 75'; Nunes 90+5'	Stadium: Avenger Park; Attendance: 2,352; Referee: Lachlan Keevers

4 October 2025 Final	Heidelberg United	1–3 (a.e.t.)	Newcastle Jets	Melbourne
19:40 AEST	Lethlean 8'	Report	Burgess 22'; Fryer 96'; Gibson 115'	Stadium: Lakeside Stadium; Attendance: 10,000; Referee: Adam Kersey

== Statistics ==
=== Appearances and goals ===
Includes all competitions. Players with no appearances not included in the list.

As of match played 16 May 2026

No.	Pos	Nat	Player	Total		A-League Men		A-League Men finals series		Australia Cup	
No.	Pos	Nat	Player	Apps	Goals	Apps	Goals	Apps	Goals	Apps	Goals
1	GK	(Australia) AUS	James Delianov	33	0	26	0	2	0	5	0
5	DF	(Republic of Ireland) IRL	Joe Shaughnessy	22	1	16+4	1	2	0	0	0
7	FW	(Australia) AUS	Eli Adams	25	11	15+6	8	2	2	0+2	1
8	MF	(New Zealand) NZL	Lachlan Bayliss	31	5	17+8	5	2	0	2+2	0
9	FW	(Australia) AUS	Lachlan Rose	30	8	19+6	8	1	0	2+2	0
10	FW	(England) ENG	Zach Clough	6	0	1+3	0	0+2	0	0	0
11	FW	(Australia) AUS	Ben Gibson	31	7	7+18	4	1+1	0	3+1	3
13	FW	(Australia) AUS	Clayton Taylor	23	9	17+4	9	2	0	0	0
14	MF	(Australia) AUS	Max Burgess	31	2	24	0	2	0	5	2
17	MF	(Australia) AUS	Kosta Grozos	25	0	15+3	0	0+2	0	3+2	0
18	FW	(Japan) JPN	Kota Mizunuma	25	5	2+16	2	0+2	0	5	3
19	MF	(Australia) AUS	Alexander Badolato	15	5	11	4	0	0	4	1
22	DF	(Australia) AUS	Joel Bertolissio	27	0	21+4	0	2	0	0	0
23	DF	(Australia) AUS	Daniel Wilmering	30	3	23	1	2	0	5	2
24	MF	(Australia) AUS	Alex Nunes	12	1	0+8	0	0	0	0+4	1
25	FW	(Australia) AUS	Oscar Fryer	6	2	1+2	1	0	0	0+3	1
28	MF	(Australia) AUS	Will Dobson	31	5	22+2	4	2	0	1+4	1
32	DF	(Australia) AUS	Mark Natta	25	1	21	1	2	0	2	0
34	DF	(Australia) AUS	Richard Nkomo	1	0	1	0	0	0	0	0
39	DF	(Australia) AUS	Thomas Aquilina	14	0	6+4	0	0	0	2+2	0
41	MF	(Malta) MLT	Lucas Scicluna	11	0	0+9	0	0	0	0+2	0
42	DF	(Australia) AUS	Max Cooper	12	0	8	0	0	0	4	0
43	FW	(Australia) AUS	Xavier Bertoncello	32	9	8+17	7	0+2	0	5	2
45	MF	(Australia) AUS	Christian Bracco	8	0	0+5	0	0	0	2+1	0
46	FW	(Malta) MLT	Ethan Debono	1	0	0	0	0	0	0+1	0
Player(s) transferred out but featured this season
15	DF	(Australia) AUS	Aleksandar Šušnjar	9	0	5	0	0	0	4	0

=== Disciplinary record ===
Includes all competitions. The list is sorted by squad number when total cards are equal. Players with no cards not included in the list.

As of match played 16 May 2026

Rank	No.	Pos.	Nat.	Name	A-League Men			A-League Men finals series			Australia Cup			Total		
Rank	No.	Pos.	Nat.	Name	Booked	(yellow card) (yellow-red card)	Sent off (straight red)	Booked	(yellow card) (yellow-red card)	Sent off (straight red)	Booked	(yellow card) (yellow-red card)	Sent off (straight red)	Booked	(yellow card) (yellow-red card)	Sent off (straight red)
1	17	MF	(Australia)	Kosta Grozos	2	0	0	0	0	0	1	1	0	3	1	0
2	42	DF	(Australia)	Max Cooper	1	1	0	0	0	0	0	0	0	1	1	0
3	8	MF	(New Zealand)	Lachlan Bayliss	5	0	0	0	0	0	1	0	0	6	0	0
4	14	MF	(Australia)	Max Burgess	4	0	0	0	0	0	1	0	0	5	0	0
5	19	MF	(Australia)	Alexander Badolato	2	0	0	0	0	0	2	0	0	4	0	0
5	22	DF	(Australia)	Joel Bertolissio	3	0	0	1	0	0	0	0	0	4	0	0
7	7	MF	(Australia)	Eli Adams	2	0	0	0	0	0	1	0	0	3	0	0
7	28	MF	(Australia)	Will Dobson	2	0	0	1	0	0	0	0	0	3	0	0
9	5	DF	(Republic of Ireland)	Joe Shaughnessy	1	0	0	1	0	0	0	0	0	2	0	0
9	9	FW	(Australia)	Lachlan Rose	1	0	0	1	0	0	0	0	0	2	0	0
9	23	DF	(Australia)	Daniel Wilmering	1	0	0	0	0	0	1	0	0	2	0	0
9	33	DF	(Australia)	Mark Natta	1	0	0	1	0	0	0	0	0	2	0	0
9	41	MF	(Malta)	Lucas Scicluna	2	0	0	0	0	0	0	0	0	2	0	0
14	1	GK	(Australia)	James Delianov	1	0	0	0	0	0	0	0	0	1	0	0
14	11	FW	(Australia)	Ben Gibson	0	0	0	0	0	0	1	0	0	1	0	0
14	39	DF	(Australia)	Thomas Aquilina	0	0	0	0	0	0	1	0	0	1	0	0
Player(s) transferred out but featured this season
1	15	DF	(Australia)	Aleksandar Šušnjar	1	0	0	0	0	0	4	0	0	5	0	0
Total					29	1	0	7	0	0	11	1	0	47	2	0

=== Clean sheets ===
Includes all competitions. The list is sorted by squad number when total clean sheets are equal. Numbers in parentheses represent games where both goalkeepers participated and both kept a clean sheet; the number in parentheses is awarded to the goalkeeper who was substituted on, whilst a full clean sheet is awarded to the goalkeeper who was on the field at the start of play. Goalkeepers with no clean sheets not included in the list.

As of match played 16 May 2026

Rank	No.	Nat.	Goalkeeper	A-League Men	A-League Men finals series	Australia Cup	Total
1	1	(Australia)	James Delianov	5	0	2	7
Total				5	0	2	7

== Club Awards ==
Award	Recipient
Player of the Year	Max Burgess
Member's Player of the Year	Max Burgess
Golden Boot	Clayton Taylor
Rising Star	Xavier Bertoncello
Craig Johnston Medal	Will Dobson
Emerging Jet	Archie Brideson
Goal of the Year	Alexander Badolato, 2025–26 A-League round one vs Central Coast Mariners

== See also ==
- 2025–26 Newcastle Jets FC (women) season
