= 2025 Australia Cup final =

- Event: 2025 Australia Cup
Heidelberg United	Newcastle Jets
1	3
- Date: 4 October 2025
- Venue: Lakeside Stadium, Melbourne
- Referee: Adam Kersey
- Attendance: 10,000

The 2025 Australia Cup final was a soccer match on 4 October played between NPL Victoria side Heidelberg United and A-League Men side Newcastle Jets to decide the winner of the 2025 Australia Cup. The winner of the final will also qualify for the 2026–27 AFC Champions League Two, provided they meet the AFC’s club licensing requirements. On 6 September, it was announced that the game would be played at Lakeside Stadium.

The 2025 Australia Cup final's crowd of 10,000 is the lowest ever crowd for an Australia Cup final.

== Route to the final ==
Heidelberg United		Round	Newcastle Jets	
Opponent	Score		Opponent	Score
St Albans Dinamo	2–0 (A)	Fourth Preliminary Round		
Hampton East Brighton	3–0 (H)	Fifth Preliminary Round		
Clifton Hill	4–1 (H)	Sixth Preliminary Round		
Northcote City FC	2–0 (A)	Seventh Preliminary Round		
Weston Bears	2–0 (H)	Round of 32	Adelaide United FC	2–1 (H)
Western Sydney Wanderers	3–0 (H)	Round of 16	Cooks Hill United FC	5–0 (A)
Wellington Phoenix	4–0 (H)	Quarter Finals	Macarthur FC	3–0 (H)
Auckland FC	2–0 (H)	Semi Finals	Avondale FC	4–2 (A)
Note: In all results above, the score of the finalist is given first (H: home; A: away).

=== Heidelberg United ===
==== Preliminary Rounds ====
Heidelberg United started their cup run in the Victoria 2025 Australia Cup fourth preliminary round, beating fellow NPL Victoria side St Albans Dinamo 2–0 courtesy of a Sabit Ngor 5th minute goal and a 90th minute goal by Fletcher Fulton. Despite Heidelberg having the lead for majority of the game, the game remained tense. Against lower division club Hampton East Brighton, a rotated Heidelberg side took another early lead through Jay McGowan, before Chok Dau and Bul Juach added to the score late in the game. Against Clifton Hill, Heidelberg took yet another early lead after Max Bisetto tapped in a loose ball off of a corner. The Hillmen responded with an equaliser 11 minutes later after Mohamed Aidara gave the ball away in the middle of the pitch, allowing Dean Lorenzi to lob the ball over Ryan Govan's head and into the goal from 40 yards out. The Bergers retook the lead in the 41st minute after Chok Dau charged down a clearance, tapped the ball around the goalkeeper, and shot it into an empty net. In the middle of the second half a low cross from Dalibor Markovic was tapped in by Sabit Ngor. Finally, in the last minute of regular time, Fletcher Fulton struck the ball into the bottom corner from the edge of the box, scoring the fourth goal for the Alexandros. Away at John Cain Memorial Park against Victorian Premier League 1 side Northcote City FC, the Bergers took the lead right before half time after Jamal Ali's shot fell to Anthony Theodoropoulos, who finished near post. In the second half, Fletcher Fulton was brought down in the box for a penalty which was put away by Sabit Ngor. With the win against Northcote City FC, Heidelberg United qualified for the semi finals of the Dockerty Cup and the Round of 32 in the Australia Cup.

==== Australia Cup ====
On 25 June, Heidelberg were drawn at home against National Premier Leagues Northern NSW side Weston Bears. 5 minutes in, Ryan Lethlean's header off of a corner was saved onto the crossbar by Bears goalkeeper Gerrard Roebuck. In the 26th minute, forward Peter Kaassen got onto a long ball from Anthony Theodoropoulos and squared it to Asahi Yokokawa, who tapped the ball into the net under defensive pressure to make it 1–0. The Bergers soon hit the woodwork for the second time. Yaren Sözer, managed to tip the ball over the bar off of a Weston Bears header, allowing Heidelberg to go into the break 1–0 up. Max Bisetto then scored late in the second half to win the game for the Alexandros 2–0. The total attendance at Olympic Village was 525.

On 30 July, the Bergers were drawn against A-League side Western Sydney Wanderers, which would again be played at Olympic Village.

== Match ==
=== Details ===
4 October 2025
19:40 AEST

Heidelberg United (2)	1–3 (a.e.t.)	Newcastle Jets (1)
Lethlean 8'	Report	Burgess 21'; Fryer 96'; Gibson 115'

Lakeside Stadium, Melbourne
Attendance: 10,000
Referee: Adam Kersey

Heidelberg United	Newcastle Jets

GK	1	(Australia) Yaren Sözer
RB	4	(Australia) Jamal Ali
CB	3	(Australia) Ben Collins
CB	14	(Australia) Ryan Lethlean	(yellow card) 99'	(substituted off) 106'
LB	7	(Australia) Fletcher Fulton	(yellow card) 69'
RM	17	(Australia) Jay McGowan		(substituted off) 86'
CM	8	(Senegal) Mohamed Aidara		(substituted off) 68'
CM	6	(Australia) Anthony Lesiotis
LM	20	(Australia) Max Bisetto		(substituted off) 62'
CF	9	(Australia) Bul Juach	(yellow card) 33'
CF	10	(Japan) Asahi Yokokawa		(substituted off) 111'
Substitutes:
GK	22	(Australia) Ryan Govan
DF	12	(Australia) Dalibor Markovic
DF	13	(Australia) Johnny Apostolopoulos	(red card) 113'	(substituted on) 106'
MF	18	(Australia) Anthony Theodoropoulos		(substituted on) 111'
MF	27	(Australia) Akiel Raffie		(substituted on) 68'
FW	15	(South Sudan) Chok Dau		(substituted on) 62'
FW	19	(Australia) Peter Klaassen		(substituted on) 86'
Head Coach:
(Australia) John Anastasiadis

GK	1	(Australia) James Delianov
RB	39	(Australia) Thomas Aquilina	(yellow card) 100'
CB	33	(Australia) Mark Natta
CB	15	(Australia) Aleksandar Šušnjar	(yellow card) 27'
LB	23	(Australia) Daniel Wilmering		(substituted off) 106'
RM	18	(Japan) Kota Mizunuma		(substituted off) 86'
CM	17	(Australia) Kosta Grozos	(yellow card) 108' (yellow-red card) 112'
CM	14	(Australia) Max Burgess		(substituted off) 76'
LM	28	(Australia) Will Dobson		(substituted off) 63'
CF	9	(Australia) Lachlan Rose		(substituted off) 63'
CF	43	(Australia) Xavier Bertoncello		(substituted off) 76'
Substitutes:
GK	40	(Australia) Jordan Baylis
MF	8	(New Zealand) Lachlan Bayliss		(substituted on) 63'
MF	24	(Australia) Alex Nunes		(substituted on) 86'
MF	25	(Australia) Oscar Fryer		(substituted on) 76'
MF	41	(Malta) Lucas Scicluna		(substituted on) 106'
MF	45	(Australia) Christian Bracco		(substituted on) 76'
FW	11	(Australia) Ben Gibson	(yellow card) 105+1'	(substituted on) 63'
Head Coach:
(Australia) Mark Milligan

Assistant referees:
Emma Kocbek
Paula Orlandi
Fourth official:
Lachlan Keevers

Match rules

- 90 minutes
- 30 minutes of extra time if necessary
- Penalty shoot-out if scores still level
- Seven named substitutes
