= 2024–25 Newcastle Jets FC season =

Newcastle Jets
2024–25 season
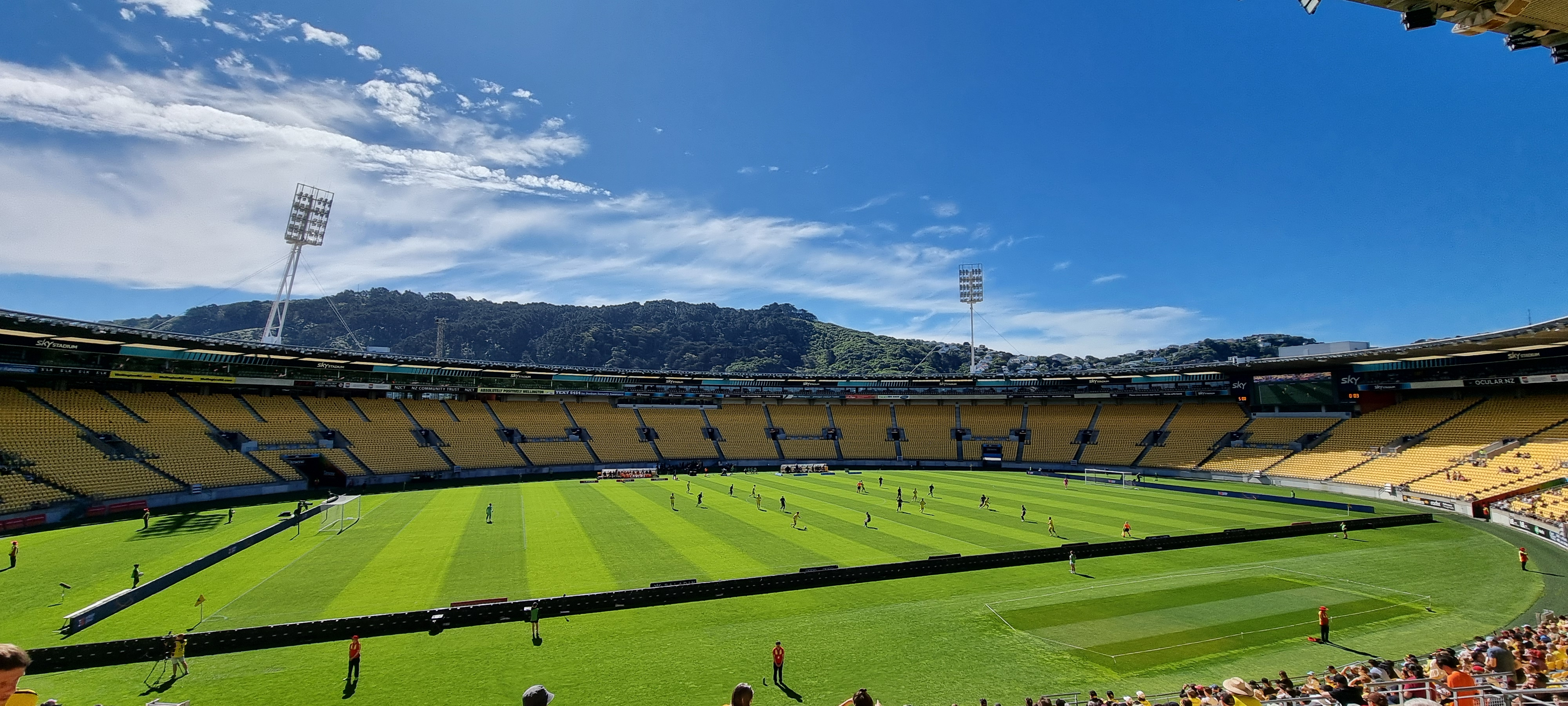
- Newcastle Jets playing away to Wellington Phoenix on 28 December 2024.
- Owner: Maverick Sports Partners (100%)
- Chairman: Shane Mattiske/Maurice Bisetto
- Head Coach: Robert Stanton
- Stadium: McDonald Jones Stadium
- A-League Men: 9th
- A-League Men Finals: DNQ
- Australia Cup: Round of 16
- Top goalscorer: League: Eli Adams (9); All: Eli Adams (9)
- Highest home attendance: 8,548 vs. Sydney FC (4 January 2025); A-League Men
- Lowest home attendance: 2,971 vs. Macarthur FC (25 August 2024); Australia Cup
- Average home league attendance: 6,608
- Biggest win: 6–0 vs. Newcastle Jets (H) (12 April 2025); A-League Men
- Biggest defeat: 2–6 vs. Western United (H) (16 March 2025); A-League Men
Home colours	Away colours	Third colours

The 2024–25 season was the Newcastle Jets Football Club's 24th season since its establishment in 2000. Newcastle Jets participated in the A-League Men for the 20th season, and the Australia Cup for the ninth time.

== Players ==
Note: Flags indicate national team as defined under FIFA eligibility rules; some limited exceptions apply. Players may hold more than one non-FIFA nationality.

No.	Pos.	Nation	Player
1	GK	AUS	Ryan Scott (vice-captain)
4	DF	AUS	Phillip Cancar
6	MF	AUS	Matthew Scarcella (on loan from Sydney FC)
7	MF	AUS	Eli Adams
9	FW	AUS	Lachlan Rose
10	FW	BRA	Wellissol
11	MF	AUS	Jacob Dowse
13	FW	AUS	Clayton Taylor
14	DF	NZL	Dane Ingham
15	DF	AUS	Aleksandar Šušnjar
17	MF	AUS	Kosta Grozos (captain)
18	MF	JPN	Kota Mizunuma
19	MF	AUS	Callum Timmins

No.	Pos.	Nation	Player
20	MF	TAN	Charles M'Mombwa
21	GK	AUS	Noah James
22	FW	AUS	Ben Gibson
23	DF	AUS	Daniel Wilmering
24	MF	AUS	Alex Nunes (scholarship)
25	MF	AUS	Oscar Fryer (scholarship)
28	MF	AUS	Will Dobson (scholarship)
29	FW	AUS	Justin Vidic (scholarship)
33	DF	AUS	Mark Natta
37	MF	NZL	Lachlan Bayliss
39	DF	AUS	Thomas Aquilina
44	DF	AUS	Ben van Dorssen (scholarship)

== Transfers and contracts ==
=== Transfers in ===
No.	Position	Name	From	Type/fee	Contract length	Date	Ref.
15	DF	Aleksandar Šušnjar	Perth Glory	Free transfer	2 years	21 May 2024	
7	MF	Eli Adams	Melbourne Victory	Free transfer	3 years	2 June 2024	
21	GK	Noah James	(Australia) Sydney Olympic	End of loan	(2 years)	18 June 2024	
25	MF	Oscar Fryer	Sydney FC NPL	Free transfer	2 year scholarship	23 June 2024	
6	MF	Matthew Scarcella	Sydney FC	Loan	1 year	2 July 2024	
9	FW	Lachlan Rose	Macarthur FC	Free transfer	2 years	21 July 2024	
22	FW	Ben Gibson	(Australia) APIA Leichhardt	Free transfer	2 years	9 September 2024	
10	FW	(Brazil) Wellissol	Unattached	Free transfer	1 year	16 September 2024	
18	FW	(Japan) Kota Mizunuma	(Japan) Yokohama F. Marinos	Free transfer	6 months (Note: Option for an additional year.)	21 January 2025	
20	MF	(Tanzania) Charles M'Mombwa	Unattached	Free transfer	6 months	23 January 2025	

==== From youth squad ====
N	Pos.	Nat.	Name	Age	Notes
44	DF	(Australia)	Ben van Dorssen	19	2-year scholarship
24	MF	(Australia)	Alex Nunes	17	2-year scholarship
28	MF	(Australia)	Will Dobson	16	2-year scholarship

=== Transfers out ===
No.	Position	Name	To	Type/fee	Date	Ref.
3	DF	Jason Hoffman	Retired		25 April 2024	
25	DF	(England) Carl Jenkinson	Unattached	End of contract	3 May 2024	
20	GK	Michael Weier	(Australia) Hume City	End of contract	25 May 2024	
5	DF	Lucas Mauragis	Unattached	End of contract	29 May 2024	
6	MF	Brandon O'Neill	Perth Glory	End of contract	29 May 2024	
7	FW	Trent Buhagiar	Unattached	End of contract	29 May 2024	
10	MF	Reno Piscopo	Unattached	End of contract	29 May 2024	
15	MF	(France) Jason Berthomier	Unattached	End of contract	29 May 2024	
18	MF	Daniel Stynes	Unattached	End of contract	29 May 2024	
26	FW	Archie Goodwin	Adelaide United	Mutual contract termination	29 May 2024	
8	FW	Apostolos Stamatelopoulos	(Scotland) Motherwell	$501,000	21 July 2024	
27	DF	Nathan Grimaldi	(Australia) St George City	Mutual contract termination	31 January 2025	
66	GK	Zac Bowling	(Australia) Blacktown City	Loan	31 January 2025	

=== Contract extensions ===
No.	Name	Position	Duration	Date	Notes
21	Noah James	Goalkeeper	2 years	18 June 2024	
19	Callum Timmins	Central midfielder	1 year	19 June 2024	
22	Phillip Cancar	Centre-back	2 years	20 June 2024	
66	Zac Bowling	Goalkeeper	1 year	21 June 2024	Scholarship contract
37	(New Zealand) Lachlan Bayliss	Midfielder	2 years	24 June 2024	
17	Kosta Grozos	Central midfielder	2 years	25 June 2024	

== Pre-season and friendlies ==
18 July 2024	Newcastle Jets (Australia)	0–4	(Australia) Sydney FC	Maitland
		Report	Kucharski 13'; Courtney-Perkins 48'; Ouahim 53' (pen.); Amanatidis 75' (pen.)	Stadium: Maitland Sports Ground; Attendance: 0 (behind closed doors)

13 August 2024	Newcastle Jets (Australia)	2–2	(New Zealand) Auckland FC	Sydney
	Natta (?); Vidic (?)	Report (Auckland FC); Report (Newcastle Herald)	Rogerson 1'; ? (?)	Stadium: Leichhardt Oval

11 September 2024	Sydney FC (Australia)	3–2	(Australia) Newcastle Jets	Sydney
	Lolley 13'; Grant 48'; Courtney-Perkins 59'	Report	Rose 30'; Gibson 87'	Stadium: Jubilee Oval; Attendance: 0 (behind closed doors)

17 September 2024	Newcastle Jets (Australia)	1–0	(New Zealand) Wellington Phoenix	Sydney
	Gibson 60'	Report		Attendance: 0 (behind closed doors)

29 September 2024	Perth Glory (Australia)	2–3	(Australia) Newcastle Jets	Bunbury
15:00 AWST	Majekodunmi 15'; Williams 43'	Report	Ingham 10'; Šušnjar 55'; Adams 66'	Stadium: Hay Park; Attendance: 2,043; Referee: Shane Skinner

2 October 2024	Perth Glory (Australia)	2–0	(Australia) Newcastle Jets	Albany
16:00 AWST	Taggart 5', 12' (pen.)	Report		Stadium: Retravision Stadium; Attendance: 2,022; Referee: Shane Skinner

12 October 2024	Sydney FC (Australia)	3–2	(Australia) Newcastle Jets	Sydney
	Lolley 10'; Klimana 20'; Costa 48'	Report	Rose 5'; Adams 75'	Stadium: Sky Park; Attendance: 0 (behind closed doors)

== Competitions ==
=== Overall record ===
Competition	First match	Last match	Starting round	Final position	Record							
Competition	First match	Last match	Starting round	Final position	Pld	W	D	L	GF	GA	GD	Win %
A-League Men	19 October 2024	4 May 2025	Matchday 1	9th	26	8	6	12	43	44	−1	30.77
Australia Cup	24 July 2024	25 August 2024	Play-offs	Round of 16	3	2	0	1	9	6	+3	66.67
Total					29	10	6	13	52	50	+2	34.48

Last updated: 4 May 2025
Source: Competitions

=== A-League Men ===
==== League table ====
Pos	Team	Pld	W	D	L	GF	GA	GD	Pts	Qualification
7	Sydney FC	26	10	7	9	53	46	+7	37	
8	Macarthur FC	26	9	6	11	50	45	+5	33	Qualification for AFC Champions League Two (Note: Qualified for AFC Champions League Two as the 2024 Australia Cup winners.)
9	Newcastle Jets	26	8	6	12	43	44	−1	30	
10	Central Coast Mariners	26	5	11	10	29	51	−22	26	Qualification for 2025 Australia Cup play-offs
11	Wellington Phoenix (Note: Auckland FC and Wellington Phoenix cannot qualify for Asian Football Confederation competitions as they are based in New Zealand, which is part of the Oceania Football Confederation.)	26	6	6	14	27	43	−16	24	Qualification for 2025 Australia Cup play-offs

Source: A-Leagues
Rules for classification: 1) points; 2) goal difference; 3) goals scored; 4) wins; 5) head-to-head results; 5a) head-to-head points; 5b) head-to-head goal difference; 6) Fair Play points; 7) away goal difference; 8) away goals per match; 9) home goal difference; 10) home goals per match; 11) toss of a coin in an event of a tie of two clubs.

==== Results summary ====
Overall								Home						Away					
Pld	W	D	L	GF	GA	GD	Pts	W	D	L	GF	GA	GD	W	D	L	GF	GA	GD
26	8	6	12	43	44	−1	30	3	3	7	22	22	0	5	3	5	21	22	−1

Last updated: 4 May 2025.
Source: Ultimate A-League
Home figures include Newcastle Jets' 1–2 loss on neutral ground in Unite Round against Central Coast Mariners on 22 November 2024.

==== Results by round ====
Round	1	2	3	4	5	6	7	8	9	10	12	11	13	15	16	17	18	19	20	21	22	14	23	24	25	26	27	28	29
Ground	H	A	B	A	N	A	H	A	B	A	H	A	H	A	H	A	H	A	H	B	H	A	H	A	H	H	A	H	A
Result	L	W	X	L	L	L	L	W	X	L	D	W	L	L	D	D	W	W	W	X	D	W	L	D	L	W	L	L	D
Position	11	5	8	9	11	11	11	11	11	11	11	11	11	11	11	11	11	11	9	9	9	9	9	9	9	9	9	9	9
Points	0	3	3	3	3	3	3	6	6	6	7	10	10	10	11	12	15	18	21	21	22	25	25	26	26	29	29	29	30

Updated to match(es) played on 4 May 2025. Source: Ultimate A-League
A = Away; H = Home; N = Neutral; B = Bye; W = Win; D = Draw; L = Loss; X = Bye

==== Matches ====
Win Draw Loss Fixtures

19 October 2024 1	Newcastle Jets	0–1	Melbourne City	Newcastle
17:00 AEDT		Report	Tilio 2'	Stadium: McDonald Jones Stadium; Attendance: 8,032; Referee: Shaun Evans

25 October 2024 2	Macarthur FC	1–2	Newcastle Jets	Sydney
19:35 AEDT	Jakoliš 19'	Report	Adams 56', 60'	Stadium: Campbelltown Sports Stadium; Attendance: 3,809; Referee: Tim Danaskos

8 November 2024 4	Western Sydney Wanderers	4–1	Newcastle Jets	Sydney
19:35 AEDT	Milanovic 22', 33', 75' (pen.); Sapsford 55'	Report	Grozos 67' (pen.)	Stadium: CommBank Stadium; Attendance: 6,220; Referee: Jack Morgan

22 November 2024 5	Newcastle Jets	1–2	Central Coast Mariners	Sydney
20:00 AEDT	Aquilina 64'	Report	Kaltak 66'; Šušnjar 75' (o.g.)	Stadium: Allianz Stadium; Attendance: 5,156; Referee: Shaun Evans

30 November 2024 6	Auckland FC	2–0	Newcastle Jets	Auckland
17:00 NZDT	Moreno 84'; de Vries 89'	Report		Stadium: Go Media Stadium; Attendance: 13,138; Referee: Tim Danaskos

7 December 2024 7	Newcastle Jets	0–1	Adelaide United	Newcastle
17:00 AEDT		Report	Mauk 14'	Stadium: McDonald Jones Stadium; Attendance: 5,713; Referee: Ben Abraham

14 December 2024 8	Perth Glory	0–4	Newcastle Jets	Perth
18:45 AWST		Report	Aquilina 8'; Bayliss 21'; Gibson 26', 46'	Stadium: HBF Park; Attendance: 5,459; Referee: Lachlan Keevers

28 December 2024 10	Wellington Phoenix	2–1	Newcastle Jets	Wellington
17:00 NZDT	Barbarouses 2'; Retre 59'	Report	Gibson 73'	Stadium: Sky Stadium; Attendance: 5,460; Referee: Jonathan Barreiro

4 January 2025 12	Newcastle Jets	2–2	Sydney FC	Newcastle
17:00 AEDT	Gurd 45' (o.g.); Taylor 72'	Report	Lolley 78'; Caceres 89'	Stadium: McDonald Jones Stadium; Attendance: 8,548; Referee: Alex King

7 January 2025 11	Brisbane Roar	0–1	Newcastle Jets	Brisbane
19:00 AEST		Report	Rose 71'	Stadium: Suncorp Stadium; Attendance: 4,821; Referee: Alireza Faghani

12 January 2025 13	Newcastle Jets	1–3	Macarthur FC	Newcastle
17:00 AEDT	Gibson 18'	Report	Germain 23'; Drew 59'; Bernardo 90+1'	Stadium: McDonald Jones Stadium; Attendance: 6,152; Referee: Shaun Evans

17 January 2025 15	Western United	3–1	Newcastle Jets	Melbourne
18:00 AEDT	Danzaki 17'; Botic 37', 54'	Report	Rose 58'	Stadium: Ironbark Fields; Attendance: 3,430; Referee: Adam Bavcar

25 January 2025 16	Newcastle Jets	2–2	Perth Glory	Newcastle
18:00 AEDT	Adams 11'; Taylor 78'	Report	Taggart 37' (pen.); Wales 84'	Stadium: McDonald Jones Stadium; Attendance: 6,354; Referee: Ben Abraham

1 February 2025 17	Central Coast Mariners	2–2	Newcastle Jets	Gosford
19:35 AEDT	Paull 39'; Faisal 50'	Report	Rose 59'; Natta 87'	Stadium: Industree Group Stadium; Attendance: 9,145; Referee: Jonathan Barreiro

8 February 2025 18	Newcastle Jets	3–0	Melbourne Victory	Newcastle
17:00 AEDT	Grozos 90+9' (pen.); Taylor 90+14'; Rose 90+20'	Report		Stadium: McDonald Jones Stadium; Attendance: 7,285; Referee: Daniel Elder

15 February 2025 19	Adelaide United	1–2	Newcastle Jets	Adelaide
19:05 ACDT	Mauk 45+1'	Report	Rose 37'; Taylor 55'	Stadium: Coopers Stadium; Attendance: 10,722; Referee: Shane Skinner

21 February 2025 20	Newcastle Jets	3–1	Brisbane Roar	Newcastle
19:35 AEDT	Mizunuma 21'; Adams 38'; Taylor 50'	Report	O'Shea 43'	Stadium: McDonald Jones Stadium; Attendance: 5,461; Referee: Sam Kelly

9 March 2025 22	Newcastle Jets	1–1	Auckland FC	Newcastle
17:00 AEDT	Adams 13'	Report	Randall 37'	Stadium: McDonald Jones Stadium; Attendance: 6,130; Referee: Nathan Shakespear

12 March 2025 14	Melbourne City	0–1	Newcastle Jets	Melbourne
19:00 AEDT		Report	Rose 69'	Stadium: AAMI Park; Attendance: 3,071; Referee: Sam Kelly

16 March 2025 23	Newcastle Jets	2–6	Western United	Newcastle
17:00 AEDT	M'Mombwa 65'; Thurgate 72' (o.g.)	Report	Botic 6'; Natta 8' (o.g.); Bozinovski 29', 53'; Danzaki 35'; Ruhs 85'	Stadium: McDonald Jones Stadium; Attendance: 5,816; Referee: Daniel Elder

28 March 2025 24	Macarthur FC	3–3	Newcastle Jets	Sydney
19:35 AEDT	Sawyer 65', 90+5'; Uskok 82'	Report	Rose 2'; Adams 7', 71'	Stadium: Campbelltown Sports Stadium; Attendance: 4,678; Referee: Alex King

6 April 2025 25	Newcastle Jets	1–2	Wellington Phoenix	Newcastle
17:00 AEDT	Oluwayemi 65' (o.g.)	Report	Barbarouses 34'; Nagasawa 41'	Stadium: McDonald Jones Stadium; Attendance: 5,109; Referee: Alireza Faghani

12 April 2025 26	Newcastle Jets	6–0	Central Coast Mariners	Newcastle
19:35 AEDT	Šušnjar 17'; Sainsbury 45' (o.g.); Wilmering 48'; Taylor 50'; Adams 73', 90+2'	Report		Stadium: McDonald Jones Stadium; Attendance: 6,822; Referee: Declan Woods

20 April 2025 27	Sydney FC	3–2	Newcastle Jets	Sydney
15:00 AEDT	Costa 36'; Segecic 55'; Kucharski 83'	Report	Rose 18'; Mizunuma 22'	Stadium: Allianz Stadium; Attendance: 10,114; Referee: Shaun Evans

26 April 2025 28	Newcastle Jets	0–1	Western Sydney Wanderers	Newcastle
17:00 AEDT		Report	Sapsford 57'	Stadium: McDonald Jones Stadium; Attendance: 7,871; Referee: Tim Danaskos

4 May 2025 29	Melbourne Victory	1–1	Newcastle Jets	Melbourne
17:00 AEDT	Bos 47'	Report	Taylor 83'	Stadium: AAMI Park; Attendance: 10,033; Referee: Shaun Evans

=== Australia Cup ===
24 July 2024 Play-offs	Newcastle Jets	4–1	Western United	Darwin
17:25 ACST	Garuccio 17' (o.g.); Aquilina 29', 66'; Grimaldi 42'	Report	Danzaki 89'	Stadium: Larrakia Park; Attendance: 1,238; Referee: Tim Danaskos

31 July 2024 Round of 32	Rockdale Ilinden	1–2	Newcastle Jets	Sydney
19:30 AEST	Antoniou 30'	Report	Vidic 11', 45+3'	Stadium: Rockdale Ilinden Sports Centre; Referee: Ben Abraham

25 August 2024 Round of 16	Newcastle Jets	3–4	Macarthur FC	Maitland
15:00 AEST	Grozos 14' (pen.); Natta 20'; Aquilina 68'	Report	Germain 48', 54'; Jakoliš 71', 75'	Stadium: Maitland Sportsground; Attendance: 2,971; Referee: Ben Abraham

== Statistics ==
=== Appearances and goals ===
Includes all competitions. Players with no appearances not included in the list.

As of match played 4 May 2025

No.	Pos	Nat	Player	Total		A-League Men		Australia Cup	
No.	Pos	Nat	Player	Apps	Goals	Apps	Goals	Apps	Goals
Goalkeepers
1	GK	(Australia) AUS	Ryan Scott	22	0	19	0	3	0
21	GK	(Australia) AUS	Noah James	7	0	7	0	0	0
Defenders
4	DF	(Australia) AUS	Phillip Cancar	20	0	15+3	0	1+1	0
14	DF	(New Zealand) NZL	Dane Ingham	16	0	7+6	0	3	0
15	DF	(Australia) AUS	Aleksandar Šušnjar	19	1	13+3	1	1+2	0
23	DF	(Australia) AUS	Daniel Wilmering	29	1	23+3	1	3	0
33	DF	(Australia) AUS	Mark Natta	25	2	21+1	1	3	1
39	DF	(Australia) AUS	Thomas Aquilina	29	5	26	2	3	3
60	DF	(Australia) AUS	Garang Arou	1	0	0+1	0	0	0
Midfielders
6	MF	(Australia) AUS	Matthew Scarcella	16	0	2+11	0	2+1	0
17	MF	(Australia) AUS	Kosta Grozos	27	3	24	2	3	1
19	MF	(Australia) AUS	Callum Timmins	28	0	23+2	0	3	0
20	MF	(Tanzania) TAN	Charles M'Mombwa	13	1	5+8	1	0	0
24	MF	(Australia) AUS	Alex Nunes	1	0	0	0	0+1	0
28	MF	(Australia) AUS	Will Dobson	12	0	1+11	0	0	0
37	MF	(New Zealand) NZL	Lachlan Bayliss	27	1	19+7	1	0+1	0
45	MF	(Australia) AUS	Christian Bracco	4	0	0+2	0	0+2	0
Forwards
7	FW	(Australia) AUS	Eli Adams	27	9	24	9	0+3	0
9	FW	(Australia) AUS	Lachlan Rose	18	8	12+6	8	0	0
10	FW	(Brazil) BRA	Wellissol	15	0	3+12	0	0	0
13	FW	(Australia) AUS	Clayton Taylor	29	7	20+6	7	3	0
18	MF	(Japan) JPN	Kota Mizunuma	12	2	8+4	2	0	0
22	FW	(Australia) AUS	Ben Gibson	22	4	12+10	4	0	0
29	FW	(Australia) AUS	Justin Vidic	10	2	1+7	0	1+1	2
Player(s) transferred out but featured this season
27	DF	(Australia) AUS	Nathan Grimaldi	4	1	1	0	2+1	1

=== Disciplinary record ===
Includes all competitions. The list is sorted by squad number when total cards are equal. Players with no cards not included in the list.

As of match played 4 May 2025

Rank	No.	Pos.	Nat.	Name	A-League Men			Australia Cup			Total		
Rank	No.	Pos.	Nat.	Name	Yellow card	(yellow card) (yellow-red card)	Red card	Yellow card	(yellow card) (yellow-red card)	Red card	Yellow card	(yellow card) (yellow-red card)	Red card
1	19	MF	(Australia)	Callum Timmins	3	0	0	2	0	0	5	0	0
1	23	DF	(Australia)	Daniel Wilmering	4	0	0	1	0	0	5	0	0
3	14	DF	(New Zealand)	Dane Ingham	4	0	0	0	0	0	4	0	0
3	15	DF	(Australia)	Aleksandar Šušnjar	4	0	0	0	0	0	4	0	0
3	39	DF	(Australia)	Thomas Aquilina	4	0	0	0	0	0	4	0	0
6	4	DF	(Australia)	Phillip Cancar	3	0	0	0	0	0	3	0	0
6	17	MF	(Australia)	Kosta Grozos	2	0	0	1	0	0	3	0	0
8	7	FW	(Australia)	Eli Adams	2	0	0	0	0	0	2	0	0
8	14	FW	(Japan)	Kota Mizunuma	2	0	0	0	0	0	2	0	0
8	33	DF	(Australia)	Mark Natta	1	0	0	1	0	0	2	0	0
8	37	MF	(New Zealand)	Lachlan Bayliss	2	0	0	0	0	0	2	0	0
11	10	FW	(Brazil)	Wellissol	1	0	0	0	0	0	1	0	0
11	20	MF	(Tanzania)	Charles M'Mombwa	1	0	0	0	0	0	1	0	0
11	21	GK	(Australia)	Noah James	1	0	0	0	0	0	1	0	0
Total					34	0	0	5	0	0	39	0	0

=== Clean sheets ===
Includes all competitions. The list is sorted by squad number when total clean sheets are equal. Numbers in parentheses represent games where both goalkeepers participated and both kept a clean sheet; the number in parentheses is awarded to the goalkeeper who was substituted on, whilst a full clean sheet is awarded to the goalkeeper who was on the field at the start of play. Goalkeepers with no clean sheets not included in the list.

As of match played 4 May 2025

Rank	No.	Nat.	Goalkeeper	A-League Men	Australia Cup	Total
1	1	(Australia)	Ryan Scott	3	0	3
2	21	(Australia)	Noah James	2	0	2
Total				5	0	5
