= Max Cooper (soccer) =

Australian soccer player

Personal information
- Full name: Maxwell Cooper
- Date of birth: 14 January 2007 (age 19)
- Place of birth: Newcastle, Australia
- Position: Central defender

Team information
- Current team: Newcastle Jets FC
- Number: 42

Youth career
- Warners Bay FC
- 2015–: Newcastle Jets

Senior career*
Years	Team	Apps	(Gls)
2025–	Newcastle Jets NPL	11	(1)
2025–	Newcastle Jets	9	(0)

International career
2026–	Australia U20	2	(0)
- * Club domestic league appearances and goals as of 17 June 2026

Max Cooper (born 14 January 2007) is an Australian professional soccer player who plays as a central defender for the Newcastle Jets.

== Youth Career ==
=== Newcastle Jets FC ===
Max joined the Jets academy at the age of eight, progressing through the entire academy before cracking into the Newcastle Jets Youth Team in the 2025 Football NSW League One season.

He would score his first goal for the Youth team against Northern Tigers in round 21, a last minute header from a set-piece.

== Club career ==
=== Newcastle Jets FC ===
==== 2025-26 - Debut season and Australia Cup Success ====
Max made his senior debut for the Jets against Adelaide United in the Australia Cup after impressing Head Coach Mark Milligan with his Youth team performances. Max played all available minutes from the Round of 32 through to the semi-final against Avondale.

Max signed a multi-year scholarship deal ahead of the 2025 Australia Cup Final, which he would unfortunately miss due to illness. He would return to the starting lineup in round one of the 2025–26 A-League against the Central Coast Mariners, where he was shown a yellow card. He would also start the round five fixture against Perth Glory.

== International Career ==
=== Youth ===
Max received his first call-up for the Australian under-20 national team alongside club team-mate Will Dobson for the Australia-China Friendship Series in March 2026. He debuted in the second game of the series, starting in a 4-2 win.

== Career statistics ==
As of 5th May 2026

Appearances and goals by club, season and competition
Club	Season	League			Domestic Cup		Continental		Other		Total	
Club	Season	Division	Apps	Goals	Apps	Goals	Apps	Goals	Apps	Goals	Apps	Goals
Newcastle Jets FC Youth	2025	Football NSW League One	8	1	—		—		—		8	1
Newcastle Jets FC Youth	2026	Football NSW League One	3	0	—		—		—		3	0
Newcastle Jets FC Youth	Jets Youth Sub-Total		11	1	—		—		—		11	1
Newcastle Jets FC	2025-26	A-League Men	9	0	4	0	—		—		13	0
Newcastle Jets FC	2026–27	A-League Men	0	0	1	0	0	0	—		1	0
Newcastle Jets FC	Jets Sub-Total		9	0	5	0	0	0	0	0	14	0
Career total			20	1	5	0	—		—		25	1

== Honours ==
Newcastle Jets FC

- Australia Cup Champions: 2025
- A-League Premiership: 2025–26
