= Xavier Bertoncello =

Australian soccer player

Personal information
- Full name: Xavier Bertoncello
- Date of birth: 6 June 2005 (age 21)
- Place of birth: Newcastle, Australia
- Position: Winger

Team information
- Current team: Newcastle Jets
- Number: 43

Youth career
- New Lambton
- 2013–2025: Newcastle Jets

Senior career*
Years	Team	Apps	(Gls)
2022–2025	Newcastle Jets NPL	87	(47)
2025–	Newcastle Jets	30	(8)
- * Club domestic league appearances and goals

Xavier Bertoncello (born 6 June 2005) is an Australian professional soccer player who plays as a winger for Newcastle Jets.

== Youth Career ==
=== Newcastle Jets FC ===
Xavier first joined the Newcastle Jets Academy at the age of nine, progressing through the ranks before cracking into the Youth Team in 2022, aged 16. After initially playing as a Left back and left winger, he eventually began playing as a Striker.

In 2022, Xavier helped the Jets Youth to promotion from the FNSW League Three competition, as they won their Grand Final.

In 2024, Xavier lead the Youth Team in scoring as they went undefeated throughout the entire 2024 FNSW League Two season, getting promoted into FNSW League One. He also won the Newcastle Jets 23/24 Emerging Jet Award, which is given to the best prospect from the club's academy for that year.

== Club career ==
=== Newcastle Jets ===
==== 2025–26: Debut season, Australia Cup and Premiers Plate Success ====
After several successful years in the Academy, Xavier would get called into the senior team for an Australia Cup Round of 32 fixture against Adelaide United. Xavier would start the match, playing 62 minutes before being substituted off. He would remain in the starting lineup for the next round, against Cooks Hill United, where he would score his first professional goal. Xavier would remain in the starting lineup for the remainder of the Australia Cup run, scoring in the semi-final against Avondale as the Newcastle Jets went on to win the Australia Cup for the first time in their history.

Xavier would start in the first round of the 2025–26 A-League Men, as the Newcastle Jets went down 3–2 to the Central Coast Mariners. He would score his first A-League goal in a 2–1 loss to Perth Glory in round five. His second goal would come in round nine, a stunning strike against Sydney FC in a 2–0 win. which would be named as the goal of the week

Bertoncello would continue to be frequently used as an impact sub for the remainder of the season, contributing a number of goals, including scoring late against Perth Glory in round 17. He also provided a match-winning assist in the 93rd minute of the Jets 2-1 win over Sydney FC, out-pacing Alex Grant before squaring the ball to Ben Gibson who tapped home the winner. Xavier would help the Jets win their first ever A-League Premiership, however they would be defeated via a penalty shootout in the semi-finals against Sydney FC, with Bertoncello having his penalty in the shootout saved by Harrison Devenish-Meares.

==== 2026–27: ====
Xavier would start in the Jets opening fixture, a 3-2 defeat to Preston Lions in the 2026 Australia Cup round of 32, providing an assist for Nikos Vergos who scored the Jet's second goal. He would make his AFC Champions League Elite debut in the Jet's 7-1 loss to Kashima Antlers, coming off the bench at half-time. Bertoncello would make his first start in the competition in the next match, a 3-1 loss to Gamba Osaka.

Bertoncello's first goal of the season would come in the Newcastle Jets 1-1 draw with Macarthur FC in match-week 2. He scored his first AFC Champions League Elite goal against Shanghai Port F.C. as the Jets lost 4-2.

== Career statistics ==
As of match played 4 November 2026

Appearances and goals by club, season and competition
Club	Season	League			Domestic Cup		Continental		Total	
Club	Season	Division	Apps	Goals	Apps	Goals	Apps	Goals	Apps	Goals
Newcastle Jets FC Youth	2022	NSW League Three	15	3	—		—		15	3
Newcastle Jets FC Youth	2023	NSW League Two	25	14	—		—		25	14
Newcastle Jets FC Youth	2024	NSW League Two	24	18	—		—		24	18
Newcastle Jets FC Youth	2025	NSW League One	23	12	—		—		23	12
Newcastle Jets FC Youth	Total		87	47	—		—		87	47
Newcastle Jets	2025–26	A-League Men	27	7	5	2	—		32	9
Newcastle Jets	2026–27	A-League Men	3	1	1	0	4	1	8	2
Newcastle Jets	Total		30	8	6	2	4	1	40	11
Career total			117	55	6	2	4	1	127	58

== Honours ==
=== Team ===
Newcastle Jets Youth

- NSW League Two Champions: 2024
- NSW League Two Premiers: 2024
- NSW League Three Champions: 2022
- NSW League Three Premiers: 2022

Newcastle Jets

- Australia Cup: 2025
- A-League Premiership: 2025–26

=== Personal ===
- Newcastle Jets Emerging Jet: 2023–24
- A-League Men Goal of the Week 2025/26, Round 9
- Newcastle Jets A-League Men's Rising Star: 2025–26
