= Clayton Taylor =

Australian soccer player (born 2004)

Personal information
- Full name: Clayton John Taylor
- Date of birth: 1 March 2004 (age 22)
- Place of birth: Sydney, New South Wales, Australia
- Height: 1.75 m (5 ft 9 in)
- Position: Winger

Team information
- Current team: Barnsley
- Number: 13

Youth career
- Rouse Hill Rams SC
- Sydney FC

Senior career*
Years	Team	Apps	(Gls)
2020–2023	Sydney FC NPL	48	(13)
2023–2026	Newcastle Jets	72	(23)
2026–	Barnsley	5	(0)

International career^{‡}
2025–	Australia U23	1	(0)
- * Club domestic league appearances and goals as of 16:28, 17 October 2026 (UTC) ‡ National team caps and goals as of 23 March 2025

Clayton John Taylor (born 1 March 2004) is an Australian professional soccer player who plays as a winger for EFL League One club Barnsley.

== Career ==
Born in Sydney, Taylor joined the Sydney FC academy having previously played for Blacktown City.

In June 2023, Taylor joined A-League Men club Newcastle Jets. He departed the club at the end of the 2025–26 season.

On 2 July 2026, Taylor joined EFL League One club Barnsley on a three-year contract with the option for a further year.

== Career statistics ==
As of match played 10 November 2026

Appearances and goals by club, season and competition
Club	Season	League			National cup (Note: Includes Australia Cup and FA Cup)		League cup (Note: Includes EFL Cup)		Other		Total	
Club	Season	Division	Apps	Goals	Apps	Goals	Apps	Goals	Apps	Goals	Apps	Goals
Sydney FC NPL	2020	National Premier Leagues NSW	2	0	–		–		—		2	0
Sydney FC NPL	2021	National Premier Leagues NSW	8	2	–		–		—		8	2
Sydney FC NPL	2022	National Premier Leagues NSW	20	5	–		–		—		20	5
Sydney FC NPL	2023	National Premier Leagues NSW	18	6	–		–		—		18	6
Sydney FC NPL	Total		48	13	–		–		–		48	13
Newcastle Jets	2023–24	A-League Men	25	7	2	1	–		0	0	27	8
Newcastle Jets	2024–25	A-League Men	26	7	3	0	–		0	0	29	7
Newcastle Jets	2025–26	A-League Men	21	9	0	0	–		2 (Note: Appearances in A-League Finals)	0	23	9
Newcastle Jets	Total		72	23	5	1	–		2	0	79	24
Barnsley	2026–27	EFL League One	5	0	1	0	2	0	2 (Note: Appearances in EFL Trophy)	0	9	0
Career total			125	36	6	1	2	0	4	0	137	37
