= Joel Bertolissio =

Australian soccer player

Personal information
- Full name: Joel Bertolissio
- Date of birth: 27 May 2003 (age 23)
- Height: 1.82 m (6 ft 0 in)
- Position: Right-back

Team information
- Current team: Newcastle Jets
- Number: 22

Youth career
- –2014: Bonnyrigg White Eagles FC
- 2015: St George FC
- 2016: Blacktown City FC
- 2016: St George FC
- 2017–2021: Western Sydney Wanderers FC

Senior career*
Years	Team	Apps	(Gls)
2020–2022	Western Sydney Wanderers FC Youth	11	(0)
2022–2024	Bulls FC Academy	43	(8)
2023–2024	Macarthur FC	3	(0)
2024–2025	APIA Leichhardt FC	25	(0)
2025–	Newcastle Jets FC	27	(0)
- * Club domestic league appearances and goals

Joel Bertolissio (born 27 May 2003) is an Australian professional soccer player who plays as a right-back for Newcastle Jets.

== Youth career ==
Joel spent his career playing for several clubs across the Football NSW Youth competitions, before finally settling in the academy of A-League club Western Sydney Wanderers FC.

== Club career ==
=== Western Sydney Wanderers Youth ===
Joel featured semi-regularly for the Western Sydney Wanderers FC Youth Team, playing for them in the National Premier Leagues NSW as well as the Football NSW League One competitions.

=== Macarthur FC/Bulls FC Academy ===
==== 2023 NPL Season/2022-23 A-League Season ====
After leaving the Wanderers, Joel signed with Bulls FC Academy, the academy of A-League side Macarthur FC. Joel featured heavily in their 2023 National Premier Leagues NSW campaign as they were relegated in dead last. Joel was also called up to first team, debuting off of the bench in a 6–1 loss to Melbourne City.

==== 2024 FNSW League One Season/2023-24 A-League Season ====
In his second season with Bulls FC, Joel dominated, scoring 7 goals in 17 games in Football NSW League One. He also featured in an Australia Cup qualifier against Perth Glory FC. He also made two short cameo's off of the bench in the 2023–24 A-League season for the first team. After limited opportunities in the first team, Joel departed Macarthur FC.

=== APIA Leichhardt ===
Joel signed for APIA Leichhardt ahead of the 2025 National Premier Leagues NSW season. He made his APIA debut as a starter in a 3–3 draw with Wollongong Wolves FC in round one of the 2025 NPL Season. He scored his only goal for APIA in a 4–1 win over NWS Spirit in an Australia Cup Qualifier. Joel helped APIA to qualify for the Australia Cup proper, before grabbing an assist in a 2–0 win over Melbourne City in the Round of 32. He made his final appearance for APIA in a 1–0 win over Manly United.

=== Newcastle Jets ===
==== 2025–26 ====
Following a trial period, Joel signed for the Newcastle Jets on the 8th of August 2025. Due to his previous cup appearance for APIA Leichhardt in the 2025 Australia Cup, Joel was ineligible to play for the Jets, as they went on to win the tournament. Joel made his Newcastle debut in round one of the 2025–26 A-League season, replacing Lachlan Bayliss in the 72nd minute as the Jets lost 3–2 to the Central Coast Mariners. He made his first start in the A-League in a round five clash against Perth Glory. Joel featured in 25 out of the 26 regular season games, as the Jets went on to win the A-League Premiership. He started both legs of the A-League semi-finals, as the Jets were defeated by Sydney FC.

== Career statistics ==
As of match played 3 June 2026

Appearances and goals by club, season and competition
Club	Season	League			Domestic Cup		Continental		Total	
Club	Season	Division	Apps	Goals	Apps	Goals	Apps	Goals	Apps	Goals
Western Sydney Wanderers FC Youth	2020	National Premier Leagues NSW	1	0	N/A		N/A		1	0
Western Sydney Wanderers FC Youth	2021	NPL2 NSW	10	0	N/A		N/A		10	0
Western Sydney Wanderers FC Youth	Wanderers Youth Total		11	0	0	0	0	0	11	0
Bulls FC Academy	2022	National Premier Leagues NSW	0	0	N/A		N/A		0	0
Bulls FC Academy	2023	National Premier Leagues NSW	26	1	N/A		N/A		26	1
Bulls FC Academy	2024	Football NSW League One	17	7	N/A		N/A		17	7
Bulls FC Academy	Bulls FC Total		43	8	0	0	0	0	43	8
Macarthur FC	2022–23	A-League	1	0	0	0	0	0	1	0
Macarthur FC	2023–24	A-League	2	0	1	0	0	0	3	0
Macarthur FC	Macarthur FC Total		3	0	1	0	0	0	4	0
APIA Leichhardt FC	2025	National Premier Leagues NSW	25	0	6	1	0	0	31	1
Newcastle Jets FC	2025–26	A-League	27	0	0	0	0	0	27	0
Newcastle Jets FC	2026–27	A-League	0	0	1	0	0	0	1	0
Career Total			109	8	8	1	0	0	117	9

== Honours ==
=== Team ===
Newcastle Jets

- A-League Premiership: 2025–26
