= Ben Gibson (soccer, born 2003) =

Australian soccer player

Personal information
- Full name: Ben Gibson
- Date of birth: 14 July 2003 (age 23)
- Place of birth: Sydney, New South Wales, Australia
- Position: Striker

Team information
- Current team: Macarthur FC
- Number: 9

Youth career
- –2021: Manly United

Senior career*
Years	Team	Apps	(Gls)
2021	Manly United	10	(2)
2022–2023	Sydney FC NPL	39	(4)
2024	APIA Leichhardt	26	(19)
2024–2026	Newcastle Jets	49	(8)
2026–	Macarthur FC	4	(0)
- * Club domestic league appearances and goals as of 16 May 2026

Ben Gibson (born 14 July 2003) is an Australian professional soccer player who plays as striker for Macarthur FC.

== Early life ==
Gibson was born on 14 July 2003 in Sydney, New South Wales. He is of New Zealander descent, with his mother being born in New Zealand.

== Career ==
Gibson joined Newcastle Jets from NPL NSW side APIA Leichhardt ahead of the 2024–25 season after finishing third in the 2024 NPL NSW Golden Boot race, one goal off top spot.

On 4 October 2025 he scored in extra time of the Australia Cup final at Lakeside Stadium, Melbourne, sealing a 3–1 win over Heidelberg United to deliver the Jets’ first Australia Cup title.

== International career ==
Gibson is a dual international, being eligible to represent either Australia (where he was born) or New Zealand (where his mother was born) at international level. In February 2025, it was reported that he was in contact with All Whites head coach Darren Bazeley over potentially representing them at the 2026 FIFA World Cup in Canada, Mexico and the United States. He was ultimately not selected and is yet to be capped for either nation.

== Career statistics ==
As of match played 10 November 2026

Appearances and goals by club, season and competition
Club	Season	League			Australia Cup		Total	
Club	Season	Division	Apps	Goals	Apps	Goals	Apps	Goals
Manly United	2021	National Premier Leagues NSW	10	2	–		10	2
Sydney FC NPL	2022	National Premier Leagues NSW	18	1	–		18	1
Sydney FC NPL	2023	National Premier Leagues NSW	21	3	–		21	3
Sydney FC NPL	Total		39	4	–		39	4
APIA Leichhardt	2024	National Premier Leagues NSW	26	19	5	5	31	24
Newcastle Jets	2024–25	A-League Men	22	4	0	0	22	4
Newcastle Jets	2025–26	A-League Men	27	4	4	3	20	6
Newcastle Jets	Total		49	8	4	3	53	11
Macarthur FC	2026–27	A-League Men	4	0	2	1	6	1
Career total			128	33	11	9	139	42

== Honours ==
Newcastle Jets

- Australia Cup: 2025
- A-League Premiership: 2025–26

Individual

- Newcastle Jets A-League Men Young Player of the Year: 2024–25
