= 2017 Emperor's Cup final =

2017 Emperor's Cup Final
Cerezo Osaka	Yokohama F. Marinos
2	1
- Date: January 1, 2018
- Venue: Saitama Stadium 2002, Saitama

2017 Emperor's Cup Final was the 97th final of the Emperor's Cup competition. The final was played at Saitama Stadium 2002 in Saitama on January 1, 2018. Cerezo Osaka won the championship.

== Match details ==
January 1, 2018

Cerezo Osaka	2–1	Yokohama F. Marinos
Kazuya Yamamura 65'; Kota Mizunuma 95'	Report	Sho Ito 8'

Saitama Stadium 2002

Cerezo Osaka
GK	21	(South Korea) Kim Jin-hyeon
DF	2	(Japan) Riku Matsuda
DF	14	(Japan) Yusuke Maruhashi	(substituted off) 77'
DF	15	(Japan) Yasuki Kimoto
DF	22	(Croatia) Matej Jonjic
MF	6	(Brazil) Souza	(substituted off) 119'
MF	10	(Japan) Hotaru Yamaguchi
MF	16	(Japan) Kota Mizunuma
MF	46	(Japan) Hiroshi Kiyotake
FW	8	(Japan) Yoichiro Kakitani	(substituted off) 80'
FW	24	(Japan) Kazuya Yamamura
Substitutes:
GK	27	(Japan) Kenta Tanno
DF	5	(Japan) Yusuke Tanaka	(substituted on) 77'
DF	23	(Japan) Tatsuya Yamashita
MF	17	(Japan) Takaki Fukumitsu
MF	20	(Japan) Noriyuki Sakemoto
MF	26	(Japan) Daichi Akiyama	(substituted on) 119'
FW	11	(Brazil) Ricardo Santos	(substituted on) 80'
Manager:
(South Korea) Yoon Jong-hwan

Yokohama F. Marinos
GK	21	(Japan) Hiroki Iikura
DF	27	(Japan) Ken Matsubara
DF	22	(Japan) Yuji Nakazawa
DF	2	(South Korea) Park Jeong-su
DF	23	(Japan) Takumi Shimohira
MF	8	(Japan) Kosuke Nakamachi
MF	14	(Japan) Jun Amano	(substituted off) 106'
MF	20	(Curaçao) Martinus
MF	33	(North Macedonia) David Babunski	(substituted off) 70'
MF	24	(Japan) Ryosuke Yamanaka	(substituted off) 45+1'
FW	16	(Japan) Sho Ito
Substitutes:
GK	31	(Japan) Daichi Sugimoto
DF	4	(Japan) Yuzo Kurihara
DF	13	(Japan) Takashi Kanai
MF	5	(Japan) Takuya Kida
MF	18	(Japan) Keita Endo	(substituted on) 45+1'
MF	25	(Japan) Naoki Maeda	(substituted on) 106'
FW	7	(Portugal) Hugo Vieira	(substituted on) 70'
Manager:
(France) Erick Mombaerts

== See also ==
- 2017 Emperor's Cup
