= Max Burgess =

Australian soccer player

Personal information
- Full name: Max Barry Burgess
- Date of birth: 16 January 1995 (age 31)
- Place of birth: Sydney, Australia
- Height: 1.85 m (6 ft 1 in)
- Position: Attacking midfielder

Team information
- Current team: Newcastle Jets
- Number: 14

Youth career
- 2013–2014: Sydney FC
- 2015–2017: Sydney FC

Senior career*
Years	Team	Apps	(Gls)
2013	Rockdale City Suns	14	(2)
2014	Sydney FC	1	(0)
2015	Newcastle Jets	5	(0)
2016	Sydney FC	0	(0)
2016–2017	Sydney FC NPL	6	(3)
2017	Sydney Olympic	8	(2)
2017	União da Madeira	2	(0)
2018	Sydney Olympic	23	(7)
2018–2019	Wellington Phoenix	23	(0)
2019–2021	Western United	25	(6)
2021–2025	Sydney FC	72	(7)
2025–	Newcastle Jets	26	(0)
- * Club domestic league appearances and goals as of 30 June 2025

Max Barry Burgess (/ˈbɜːrdʒəs/, ber-JUHS; born 16 January 1995) is an Australian professional soccer player who plays for Newcastle Jets in the A-League.

== Career ==
=== Sydney FC ===
Burgess started his career at Rockdale City Suns under coach Branko Culina, where he was spotted by Sydney FC management and signed up to the Sydney FC Youth team. He made his first start for the senior squad in Round 1 of the 2014-15 A-League against Melbourne City.

=== Newcastle Jets ===
On 28 March 2015 Newcastle Jets announced that they had signed Burgess as an injury replacement player for the remainder of the 2014–15 A-League season. Burgess made his Jet's inauguration in the Round 23 clash against Adelaide United, coming off the bench as a substitute for fellow youngster Mitch Cooper. He continued his spree of appearances, and was issued a yellow card in the 4–3 loss to Sydney FC. His A-League season culminated against the Brisbane Roar in the final round of the season, again coming on for the aforementioned Cooper in the 52nd minute. The game ended 2–1 to the Roar.

=== Return to Sydney ===
On 3 August 2015, Burgess returned to Sydney FC as part of the FFA Cup squad and the Youth Team.

=== C.F. União ===
Burgess joined Portuguese LigaPro side União in June 2017 on a three-year deal.

=== Wellington Phoenix ===
In October 2018, Burgess joined Wellington Phoenix on a one-year contract from Sydney Olympic.

=== Western United ===
On 16 May 2019, it was announced that Burgess would be departing from the Phoenix. He later signed for Western United on a two-year contract. Burgess scored his first hat-trick in the A-League on 1 March 2020 against Central Coast Mariners.

=== Second Return to Sydney FC ===
It was announced in late May 2021, that Burgess would sign a third time for Sydney FC in controversial manner, after walking way from Western United with a season left to run on his contract.

Burgess spent 4 seasons at Sydney FC, before departing at the end of the 2024-25 season.

=== Return to Newcastle Jets ===
Burgess re-joined Newcastle Jets ahead of the 2025-26 season.

== Career Statistics ==
As of match played 17 April 2026

Club	Season	League			Domestic Cup		Continental		Total	
Club	Season	Division	Apps	Goals	Apps	Goals	Apps	Goals	Apps	Goals
Rockdale City Suns	2013	National Premier Leagues NSW	14	2	—		—		14	2
Newcastle Jets FC	2014–15	A-League Men	5	0	—		—		5	0
Sydney FC	2014–15	A-League Men	1	0	—		—		1	0
Sydney FC	2015–16	A-League Men	0	0	—		0	0	0	0
Sydney FC Youth	2016	National Premier Leagues NSW 2	6	3	—		—		6	3
União da Madeira	2017–18	LigaPro	1	0	1	0	—		2	0
Sydney Olympic FC	2017	National Premier Leagues NSW	8	2	—		—		8	2
Sydney Olympic FC	2018	National Premier Leagues NSW	23	7	—		—		23	7
Sydney Olympic FC	Sydney Olympic Total		31	9	0	0	0	0	31	9
Wellington Phoenix Reserves	2018-19	New Zealand Football Premiership	1	0	—		—		1	0
Wellington Phoenix FC	2018–19	A-League Men	23	0	0	0	—		23	0
Western United FC	2019–20	A-League Men	24	7	0	0	—		24	7
Western United FC	2020–21	A-League Men	1	0	0	0	—		1	0
Western United FC	Western United Total		25	7	0	0	0	0	25	7
Sydney FC	2021–22	A-League Men	23	3	4	0	6	0	33	3
Sydney FC	2022–23	A-League Men	26	2	3	1	—		29	3
Sydney FC	2023–24	A-League Men	22	2	3	0	—		25	2
Sydney FC	2024–25	A-League Men	3	0	0	0	4	0	7	0
Sydney FC	Sydney FC 3rd Spell Total		74	7	10	1	10	0	94	8
Newcastle Jets FC	2025–26	A-League Men	26	0	5	2	—		31	2
Newcastle Jets FC	2026–27	A-League Men	4	0	1	0	4	0	9	0
Newcastle Jets FC	Newcastle Jets 2nd Spell Total		30	0	6	2	4	0	40	2
Career total			211	28	17	3	14	0	242	31

== Honours ==
=== Player ===
Sydney FC

- Australia Cup: 2023

Newcastle Jets

- Australia Cup: 2025
- A-League Premiership: 2025–26

=== Individual ===
- Mark Viduka Medal: 2025
- Newcastle Jets A-League Men's Player of the Year: 2025–26
- Newcastle Jets A-League Men's Members Player of the Year: 2025–26
