= Lucas Scicluna =

Maltese footballer

Personal information
- Full name: Lucas Dean Scicluna
- Date of birth: 7 November 2005 (age 21)
- Place of birth: Australia
- Position: Defensive midfielder

Team information
- Current team: Perth Glory
- Number: 16

Youth career
- 2011–2012: Aston Villa
- 2012–2023: Wolverhampton Wanderers
- 2024–2025: Central Coast Mariners

Senior career*
Years	Team	Apps	(Gls)
2024–2025	Central Coast Mariners Academy	36	(3)
2024–2025	Central Coast Mariners	4	(0)
2025–2026	Newcastle Jets NPL	9	(1)
2025–2026	Newcastle Jets	10	(0)
2026–	Perth Glory	4	(0)

International career^{‡}
2022–2025	Malta U19	14	(0)
2025–	Malta U21	1	(0)
- * Club domestic league appearances and goals as of 14 March 2026 ‡ National team caps and goals as of 9 September 2025

Lucas Dean Scicluna (born 7 November 2005) is a professional footballer who plays as a defensive midfielder for Perth Glory. Born in Australia, he represents Malta at youth level.

== Club career ==
=== Youth ===
Lucas moved to England from Australia at the age of eight, first joining the Aston Villa academy at under-8s. After a season with Aston Villa, he moved to the academy of Wolverhampton Wanderers.

Scicluna earned a scholarship deal with Wolverhampton, spending the 2022–23 season with their Under-18s side before departing at the end of the season.

Lucas returned to Australia, signing with the Central Coast Mariners Academy.

=== Central Coast Mariners ===
After returning from England, Lucas featured heavily for the Central Coast Mariners reserve team in the National Premier Leagues NSW

Lucas featured in the Central Coast Mariners senior squad for the first time in the 2024–25 AFC Champions League Elite, as he was on the bench against Shanghai Shenhua F.C. He made his professional debut against Western United FC on January 29, 2025. Lucas departed the Mariners at the conclusion of the 2024–25 A-League season.

=== Newcastle Jets ===
After initially playing for the Newcastle Jets Youth team in the Football NSW League One competition, Scicluna debuted for the senior team against Adelaide United in the Australia Cup. On the 23rd of September 2025, the Newcastle Jets would announce that Scicluna had signed a one-year scholarship deal with the club. Lucas would not feature for the senior team again until the 2025 Australia Cup final, coming off of the bench to help the Jets win the cup.

== International career ==
Lucas has featured for the Malta national football team at both U19 and U21 level.

== Personal life ==
He is the younger brother of Dylan Scicluna.

== Career statistics ==
As of 7 February 2026

Appearances and goals by club, season and competition
Club	Season	League			Domestic Cup		Continental		Other		Total	
Club	Season	Division	Apps	Goals	Apps	Goals	Apps	Goals	Apps	Goals	Apps	Goals
Central Coast Mariners Academy	2024	National Premier Leagues NSW	28	3	—		—		—		28	3
Central Coast Mariners Academy	2025	National Premier Leagues NSW	8	0	—		—		—		8	0
Central Coast Mariners Academy	Total		36	3	0	0	0	0	0	0	36	3
Central Coast Mariners FC	2024–25	A-League Men	4	0	1	0	0	0	—		5	0
Newcastle Jets FC Youth	2025	Football NSW League One	7	1	—		—		—		7	1
Newcastle Jets FC Youth	2026	Football NSW League One	2	0	—		—		—		1	0
Newcastle Jets FC Youth	Total		9	1	0	0	0	0	0	0	9	1
Newcastle Jets FC	2025–26	A-League Men	10	0	2	0	—		—		12	0
Perth Glory FC	2026–27	A-League Men	4	0	1	0					5	0
Career total			62	4	4	0	—		—		66	4

== Honours ==
=== Newcastle Jets ===
Australia Cup: 2025

A-League Premiership: 2025–26
