= Kota Mizunuma =

Japanese footballer

Kota Mizunuma 水沼 宏太
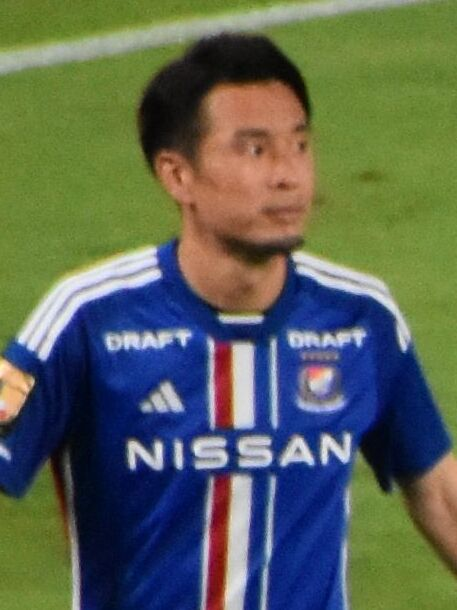
- Mizunuma with Yokohama F. Marinos in 2023

Personal information
- Full name: Kota Mizunuma
- Date of birth: 22 February 1990 (age 36)
- Place of birth: Aoba-ku, Yokohama, Kanagawa, Japan
- Height: 1.77 m (5 ft 10 in)
- Position: Winger

Team information
- Current team: Urawa Red Diamonds
- Number: 8

Youth career
- 1997–2001: Azamino FC
- 2002–2007: Yokohama F. Marinos

Senior career*
Years	Team	Apps	(Gls)
2008–2012	Yokohama F. Marinos	29	(0)
2010–2011	→ Tochigi SC (loan)	50	(7)
2012	→ Sagan Tosu (loan)	33	(5)
2013–2015	Sagan Tosu	91	(15)
2016–2017	FC Tokyo	17	(1)
2016	FC Tokyo U-23	9	(3)
2017	→ Cerezo Osaka (loan)	24	(3)
2018–2019	Cerezo Osaka	58	(8)
2020–2025	Yokohama F. Marinos	143	(16)
2025–2026	Newcastle Jets	30	(4)
2026–	Urawa Red Diamonds	0	(0)

International career^{‡}
2005–2007	Japan U17	11	(6)
2007–2008	Japan U19	11	(4)
2009	Japan U20	3	(1)
2010	Japan U21	7	(2)
2011–2012	Japan U23	2	(0)
2022	Japan	2	(0)
Medal record
Cerezo Osaka
Winner	J.League Cup	2017
Winner	Emperor's Cup	2017
Yokohama F. Marinos
Runner-up	J1 League	2021
Winner	J1 League	2022
Runner-up	J1 League	2023
Men's football
Representing Japan
Asian Games
Gold medal – first place	2010 Guangzhou	Team
EAFF Championship
Winner	2022 Japan	Team
AFC U-16 Championship
Gold medal – first place	2006 Singapore
- * Club domestic league appearances and goals as of 03:57, 26 January 2026 (UTC) ‡ National team caps and goals as of 27 July 2022

Kota Mizunuma (水沼 宏太, Mizunuma Kōta; pronounced [mʲizɯnɯma koːta]; born 22 February 1990) is a Japanese professional footballer who plays for J1 League club Urawa Red Diamonds.

== Club career ==
On 1 January 2018, Mizunuma scored the game winning goal in extra-time of the final of the Emperor's Cup, helping secure Cerezo Osaka their fourth national cup trophy.

He was included in the J1 League Best XI during the 2022 season as his club Yokohama F. Marinos won their fifth J1 title and seventh Japanese title overall.

=== Newcastle Jets ===
==== 2024-25 Season ====
On 21 January 2025, Mizunuma moved abroad for the first time in his career, signing for A-League Men side Newcastle Jets on an initial six-month deal.

==== 2025-26 Season ====
Mizunuma impressed during the successful 2025 Australia Cup campaign, playing all five games whilst scoring three times and assisting once. An injury ruled Kota out of the first seven rounds of the A-League, making his first appearance of the campaign off the bench in a 3–1 away win over Wellington Phoenix. He scored his first goal of the A-League campaign in his first start in a 2–1 win over Sydney FC.

On 28 May 2026, the club confirmed that Mizunuma would depart the club at the expiration of his contract at the end of the 2025–26 season.

== International career ==
In August 2007, Mizunuma was elected Japan U-17 national team for 2007 U-17 World Cup. He served as captain and played all 3 matches as right midfielder.

Mizunuma earned two caps for the Japan national team in 2022, both coming in the EAFF E-1 Football Championship which Japan won for a second time.

== Personal life ==
His father, Takashi, was also a professional footballer who earned 32 caps for Japan.

== Club statistics ==
As of match played on 23 January 2026

Appearances and goals by club, season and competition
Club	Season	League			National cup (Note: Includes Emperor's Cup, Australia Cup)		League cup (Note: Includes J.League Cup)		Continental		Other		Total	
Club	Season	Division	Apps	Goals	Apps	Goals	Apps	Goals	Apps	Goals	Apps	Goals	Apps	Goals
Yokohama F. Marinos	2007	J. League Division 1	3	0	0	0	0	0	—		—		3	0
Yokohama F. Marinos	2008	J. League Division 1	10	0	0	0	4	0	—		—		14	0
Yokohama F. Marinos	2009	J. League Division 1	12	0	1	0	5	0	—		—		18	0
Yokohama F. Marinos	2010	J. League Division 1	4	0	0	0	2	0	—		—		6	0
Yokohama F. Marinos	Total		29	0	1	0	11	0	—		—		41	0
Tochigi S.C.	2010	J. League Division 2	13	2	2	1	—		—		—		15	3
Tochigi S.C.	2011	J. League Division 2	37	5	2	0	—		—		—		39	5
Tochigi S.C.	Total		50	7	4	1	—		—		—		54	8
Sagan Tosu	2012	J. League Division 1	33	5	1	0	4	2	—		—		38	7
Sagan Tosu	2013	J. League Division 1	27	4	3	1	4	0	—		—		34	5
Sagan Tosu	2014	J. League Division 1	32	4	1	0	3	1	—		—		36	5
Sagan Tosu	2015	J1 League	32	7	2	2	4	1	—		—		38	10
Sagan Tosu	Total		124	20	7	3	15	4	—		—		146	27
FC Tokyo	2016	J1 League	17	1	2	0	2	0	—		—		21	1
Cerezo Osaka	2017	J1 League	24	3	2	2	7	2	—		—		33	7
Cerezo Osaka	2018	J1 League	27	1	2	1	0	0	4 (Note: Appearances in AFC Champions League)	1	1 (Note: Appearance in Japanese Super Cup)	0	34	3
Cerezo Osaka	2019	J1 League	31	7	3	0	6	2	—		—		40	9
Cerezo Osaka	Total		82	11	7	3	13	2	4	1	1	0	107	19
Yokohama F. Marinos	2020	J1 League	25	3	—		1	0	6	0	1	0	33	3
Yokohama F. Marinos	2021	J1 League	36	3	1	0	7	3	—		—		44	6
Yokohama F. Marinos	2022	J1 League	31	7	2	0	2	0	7	0	—		42	7
Yokohama F. Marinos	2023	J1 League	33	1	2	0	9	2	6	2	1	0	51	5
Yokohama F. Marinos	2024	J1 League	18	2	5	1	3	1	8	1	—		34	5
Yokohama F. Marinos	Total		143	16	10	1	22	6	27	3	2	0	204	26
Newcastle Jets FC	2024–25	A-League Men	12	2	—		—		—		—		12	2
Newcastle Jets FC	2025–26	A-League Men	17	1	5	3	—		—		—		22	4
Newcastle Jets FC	Total		29	3	5	3	—		—		—		34	6
Urawa Red Diamonds	2026–27	J1 League	2	0	1	0	0	0	0	0	0	0	3	0
Career total			476	58	39	11	63	14	31	4	3	0	602	87

== Honours ==
Cerezo Osaka

- Emperor's Cup: 2017
- J.League Cup: 2017

Yokohama F. Marinos

- J1 League: 2022
- Japanese Super Cup: 2023

Newcastle Jets

- Australia Cup: 2025
- A-League Premiership: 2025–26

Japan U17

- AFC U-17 Championship: 2006

Japan U23

- Asian Games: 2010

Japan

- EAFF Championship: 2022

Individual

- J.League Best XI: 2022
- A-League Men Goal of the Month: March 2026
