= Oscar Fryer =

Australian soccer player

Personal information
- Full name: Oscar Fryer
- Date of birth: 16 April 2006 (age 20)
- Height: 1.78 m (5 ft 10 in)
- Position: Winger

Team information
- Current team: Newcastle Jets
- Number: 25

Youth career
- Hurlstone Park Wanderers FC
- –2020: Sydney University SFC
- 2021: Hakoah Sydney City East FC
- 2022: SD Raiders
- 2023–2024: Sydney FC

Senior career*
Years	Team	Apps	(Gls)
2023–2024	Sydney FC Youth	20	(6)
2024–	Newcastle Jets	3	(1)

International career
2022	Australia U17s		
- * Club domestic league appearances and goals

Oscar Fryer (born 16 April 2006) is an Australian professional soccer player who plays as a winger for Newcastle Jets.

== Youth Career ==
=== Sydney FC ===
Oscar spent his youth in the systems of several NPL clubs around Sydney, before signing with the Sydney FC academy. Oscar cracked into the Sydney FC Youth team in 2023, before departing halfway through the 2024 NPL NSW season.

=== 2024-25 ===
Fryer joined the Newcastle Jets FC as an 18-year-old, signing a two-year deal with the Hunter based club. Shortly after signing, Oscar suffered a devastating Anterior cruciate ligament injury that kept him out for 13 months.

=== 2025-26 ===
He returned from injury against Cooks Hill United in the Australia Cup. Oscar scored his first goal for the Newcastle Jets in the 2025 Australia Cup final, a stunning curling effort to put the Jets up 2-1 over Heidelberg United.. Oscar made his A-League debut in the Jets opening day defeat to the Central Coast Mariners, starting before being withdrawn in the 56th minute. Fryer scored his first league goal in a 5-2 win over Melbourne Victory. Unfortunately, Oscar suffered a second ACL injury in two seasons, ruling him out for the remainder of the season.

== Career statistics ==
As of match played 22 June 2026

Appearances and goals by club, season and competition
Club	Season	League			Domestic Cup		Continental		Total	
Club	Season	Division	Apps	Goals	Apps	Goals	Apps	Goals	Apps	Goals
Sydney FC Youth	2023	NPL NSW	13	4	-	-	-	-	13	4
Sydney FC Youth	2024	NPL NSW	7	2	-	-	-	-	7	2
Sydney FC Youth	Sydney FC Youth Total		20	6	0	0	0	0	20	6
Newcastle Jets FC	2024–25	A-League	0	0	0	0	-	-	0	0
Newcastle Jets FC	2025–26	A-League	3	1	3	1	-	-	6	2
Newcastle Jets FC	Newcastle Jets Total		3	1	3	1	0	0	6	2
Career Total			23	7	3	1	0	0	26	8

== Honours ==
=== Team ===
Newcastle Jets

- Australia Cup: 2025
- A-League Premiership: 2025–26
