= Ryan Lethlean =

Australian soccer player

Personal information
- Full name: Ryan Alexander Lethlean
- Date of birth: 27 March 2002 (age 24)
- Place of birth: Melbourne, Australia
- Position: Defender

Youth career
- Sydenham Park
- Keilor Park
- Moreland City
- 2018–2023: Melbourne Victory

Senior career*
Years	Team	Apps	(Gls)
2018–2024	Melbourne Victory NPL	56	(7)
2021–2023	Melbourne Victory	0	(0)
2024	Brisbane Roar	2	(0)
2024	Brisbane Roar NPL	18	(0)
2025–	Heidelberg United	3	(0)
- * Club domestic league appearances and goals as of 28 February 2025

Ryan Lethlean (born 27 March 2002) is an Australian professional footballer who plays as a centre-back for National Premier Leagues Victoria club Heidelberg United.

== Club career ==
=== Melbourne Victory ===
In 2021 season, Ryan Lethlean made his professional debut in a FFA Cup playoff match on 24 November 2021 against Perth Glory, scoring in a penalty shootout.
