= Wellissol =

Brazilian footballer

Personal information
- Full name: Wellissol Santos de Oliveira
- Date of birth: 16 February 1998 (age 28)
- Place of birth: Salvador, Bahia, Brazil
- Height: 1.82 m (6 ft 0 in)
- Position: Forward

Team information
- Current team: Samgurali
- Number: 9

Youth career
- Galícia Esporte Clube
- SC Internacional
- Criciúma
- Chapecoense

Senior career*
Years	Team	Apps	(Gls)
2019	Rio Branco	6	(1)
2019–2021	Coritiba	24	(1)
2021	→ Brasil de Pelotas (loan)	7	(0)
2021	Figueirense	5	(0)
2022–2024	São Joseense	35	(3)
2022	→ Boa Esporte (loan)	17	(2)
2023	→ Novo Hamburgo (loan)	2	(0)
2023	→ Eschen/Mauren (loan)	10	(0)
2024	Brusque	12	(1)
2024–2025	Newcastle Jets	15	(0)
2025–	Samgurali	36	(12)
- * Club domestic league appearances and goals as of 10 July 2026

Wellissol Santos de Oliveira, known as Wellissol (born 16 February 1998) is a Brazilian professional footballer who plays as a forward for Samgurali.

== Youth career ==
Wellissol played for Galícia Esporte Clube in his native city of Salvador, Bahia. He spent time with SC Internacional before turning out for Criciúma and Chapecoense.

== Club career ==
In 2019, Wellissol transferred from Chapecoense to Coritiba. Later that year, he entered the national level of Brazilian football, making his debut in the Campeonato Brasileiro Série B. With Coritiba being promoted, Wellissol gained experience playing four matches in the first tier. In December 2020, he joined Brasil de Pelotas on loan, making seven appearances in Série B.

Transferring in April 2021, Wellissol played five times for Figureirense in the Santa Catarina state league.

In 2022, he moved to São Joseense where he played in the Parana state league. He spent time on loan in 2023 playing in the Gaúcho state league for Novo Hamburgo before returning to São Joseense, where he appeared in ten matches in the Campeonato Brasileiro Série D in 2023. In late 2023, Wellissol moved on loan to USV Eschen/Mauren, a club from Liechtenstein who play in the Swiss fourth tier.

Wellissol transferred from São Joseense to Brusque in February 2024. In 2024, he played twice in the Santa Catarina state league and ten times in Série B. In August 2024, Wellissol left Brusque. On 16 September 2024, it was announced that Wellissol had signed for Australian club Newcastle Jets.

== Career statistics ==
As of match played 22 August 2024

Appearances and goals by club, season and competition
Club	Season	League			National cup		State league		Total	
Club	Season	Division	Apps	Goals	Apps	Goals	Apps	Goals	Apps	Goals
Rio Branco	2019	Campeonato Paranaense	—		0	0	6	1	6	1
Coritiba	2019	Campeonato Brasileiro Série B	10	0	0	0	0	0	10	0
Coritiba	2020	Campeonato Paranaense	—		0	0	10	1	10	1
Coritiba	2020	Campeonato Brasileiro Série A	4	0	0	0	0	0	4	0
Coritiba	Total		14	0	0	0	10	1	24	1
Brasil de Pelotas (loan)	2020	Campeonato Brasileiro Série B	7	0	0	0	0	0	7	0
Figueirense	2021	Campeonato Catarinense	—		0	0	5	0	5	0
São Joseense	2022	Campeonato Paranaense	—		0	0	12	2	12	2
Boa Esporte (loan)	2022	Campeonato Mineiro Módulo II	—		0	0	17	2	17	2
São Joseense	2023	Campeonato Paranaense	—		0	0	6	0	6	0
São Joseense	2023	Campeonato Brasileiro Série D	7	0	0	0	0	0	7	0
São Joseense	Total		7	0	0	0	6	0	13	0
Novo Hamburgo (loan)	2023	Campeonato Gaúcho	—		0	0	2	0	2	0
Eschen/Mauren (loan)	2023	Swiss 1. Liga	10	0	0	0	0	0	10	0
São Joseense	2024	Campeonato Paranaense	—		0	0	7	1	7	1
Brusque	2024	Campeonato Catarinense	—		0	0	2	0	2	0
Brusque	2024	Campeonato Brasileiro Série B	10	1	2	0	0	0	12	1
Brusque	Total		10	1	2	0	2	0	14	1
