= Will Dobson (soccer) =

Australian soccer player

Personal information
- Full name: Will Dobson
- Date of birth: 7 September 2007 (age 19)
- Position: Attacking midfielder

Team information
- Current team: Newcastle Jets
- Number: 28

Youth career
- Belmont FC
- 2020–2021: Weston Bears FC
- 2022–2024: Newcastle Jets FC

Senior career*
Years	Team	Apps	(Gls)
2022–2025	Newcastle Jets FC Youth	41	(8)
2024–	Newcastle Jets FC	41	(4)

International career^{‡}
2026 -	Australia U20	4	(1)
- * Club domestic league appearances and goals as of 1 April 2026 ‡ National team caps and goals as of 1 September 2026

Will Dobson (born 7 September 2007) is an Australian professional soccer player who plays as an attacking midfielder for the Newcastle Jets.

== Youth career ==
Will Dobson joined the Newcastle Jets Academy in 2022 after a two year spell away with Weston Bears FC, where he played in their U16s as a 14 year old.

He made his debut for the Jets Youth team in 2023, coming off the bench against Hurstville ZFC as a 15 year old. He scored his first goal for the Youth team in the 2024 Football NSW League Two season against South Coast Flame FC, going on to finish that campaign with 7 goals in 26 games as the Jets Youth team went unbeaten and earned promotion into FNSW League One.

== Club career ==
=== Newcastle Jets FC ===
==== Debut Season (2024-25) ====
Ahead of the 2024–25 A-League season, Dobson was awarded a two-year scholarship deal by Head Coach Robert Stanton. He made his debut off of the bench in round one against Melbourne City. Dobson made his first start later on that season against Perth Glory.

== International Career ==
=== Youth ===
Having previously represented the Australian schoolboys on a tour of the United Kingdom and Netherlands alongside Newcastle Jets team-mate Alex Nunes, Dobson received his first official call-up in 2026, where he was named in the Australia Men's National Under-20's Football Team to play China in the Australia-China Friendship Series. Dobson started the first match of the series, playing 62 minutes.

== Career statistics ==
As of 4 November 2026

Appearances and goals by club, season and competition
Club	Season	League			Domestic Cup		Continental		Other		Total	
Club	Season	Division	Apps	Goals	Apps	Goals	Apps	Goals	Apps	Goals	Apps	Goals
Newcastle Jets FC Youth	2023	Football NSW League Two	6	0	—		—		—		6	0
Newcastle Jets FC Youth	2024	Football NSW League Two	26	7	—		—		—		26	7
Newcastle Jets FC Youth	2025	Football NSW League One	9	1	—		—		—		9	1
Newcastle Jets FC Youth	Jets Youth Sub-Total		41	8	—		—		—		41	8
Newcastle Jets FC	2024–25	A-League Men	12	0	0	0	—		—		12	0
Newcastle Jets FC	2025-26	A-League Men	26	4	5	1	—		—		31	5
Newcastle Jets FC	2026–27	A-League Men	3	0	1	1	4	0	—		8	1
Newcastle Jets total			41	4	6	2	4	0	—		51	6
Career Total			82	12	6	2	4	0	0	0	92	14

== Honours ==
Newcastle Jets FC Youth

- Football NSW League Two Champions: 2024
- Football NSW League Two Premiers: 2024

Newcastle Jets FC

- Australia Cup Champions: 2025
- A-League Premiership: 2025–26

Individual

- Newcastle Jets Craig Johnston award: 2025–26
