= Daniel Wilmering =

Australian soccer player

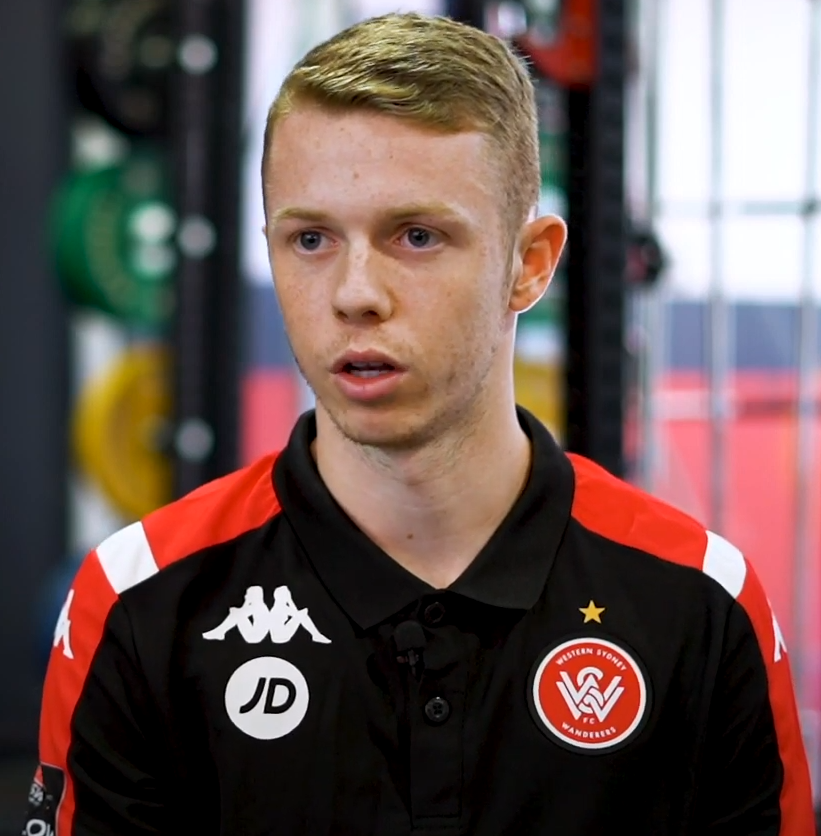
- Wilmering with Western Sydney Wanderers in 2021

Personal information
- Full name: Daniel Wilmering
- Date of birth: 19 December 2000 (age 25)
- Place of birth: Sydney, Australia
- Height: 1.78 m (5 ft 10 in)
- Position: Left back

Team information
- Current team: Newcastle Jets
- Number: 23

Youth career
- Moorebank Soccer Club
- 2013–2015: Marconi Stallions
- 2016–2018: Western Sydney Wanderers

Senior career*
Years	Team	Apps	(Gls)
2018–2023	Western Sydney Wanderers NPL	51	(4)
2019–2023	Western Sydney Wanderers	34	(1)
2023–	Newcastle Jets	71	(2)
- * Club domestic league appearances and goals as of 22 February 2026

Daniel Wilmering (born 19 December 2000) is an Australian professional soccer player who plays as a left back for Newcastle Jets.

== Personal life ==
Wilmering attended Westfields Sports High School.

== Career ==
=== Western Sydney Wanderers ===
Wilmering made his professional debut on 17 March 2019, replacing Raúl Llorente in the 94th minute as the Wanderers were downed 3–1 by Wellington Phoenix at Westpac Stadium.

On 3 July 2019, he signed a two-year scholarship contract with Western Sydney, famously graduating from being a ball boy at the Wanderers’ first ever A-League match in 2012.

=== Newcastle Jets ===
In June 2023, Wilmering left Western Sydney Wanderers and joined Newcastle Jets.
