= Christian Bracco =

Australian soccer player

Personal information
- Full name: Christian Bracco
- Date of birth: 29 January 2004 (age 22)
- Place of birth: Newcastle, Australia
- Positions: Midfielder; right back

Youth career
- 2017–2018: Newcastle Olympic
- 2019–2020: Lambton Jaffas
- 2020–2022: Broadmeadow Magic
- 2023–2025: Newcastle Jets Youth

Senior career*
Years	Team	Apps	(Gls)
2022	Broadmeadow Magic	5	(0)
2023–2025	Newcastle Jets Youth	57	(3)
2024–2026	Newcastle Jets	6	(0)
- * Club domestic league appearances and goals

Christian Bracco (Born 29 January 2004) is an association football player who last played for the Newcastle Jets.

== Career ==
=== Broadmeadow Magic FC ===
Christian made his senior debut against Valentine FC in the semi-professional National Premier Leagues Northern NSW competition. He played five games, all of them off the bench, before signing with the Newcastle Jets Academy.

=== Newcastle Jets FC ===
After several years impressing in the academy, Christian was called into the senior team for a 2024 Australia Cup qualifier against Western United FC. He came off of the bench to play the last 18 minutes. He also featured in the Round of 32 fixture against Rockdale Ilinden FC. He made his A-League Men debut against Sydney FC, coming off of the bench for the last five minutes of the game.

Christian started two of the five games in the Jets successful 2025 Australia Cup run, also coming off of the bench in the 3-1 extra time victory against Heidelberg United FC in the final.

== Career statistics ==
As of 18 November 2025

Appearances and goals by club, season and competition
Club	Season	League			Domestic Cup		Continental		Other		Total	
Club	Season	Division	Apps	Goals	Apps	Goals	Apps	Goals	Apps	Goals	Apps	Goals
Broadmeadow Magic FC	2022	National Premier Leagues Northern NSW	5	0	—		—		—		5	0
Broadmeadow Magic FC	Broadmeadow Magic Sub-Total		5	0	0	0	0	0	0	0	5	0
Newcastle Jets FC Youth	2023	Football NSW League Two	19	0	—		—		—		19	0
Newcastle Jets FC Youth	2024	Football NSW League Two	20	1	—		—		—		20	1
Newcastle Jets FC Youth	2025	Football NSW League One	18	2	—		—		—		18	2
Newcastle Jets FC Youth	Jets Youth Sub-Total		57	3	—		—		—		57	3
Newcastle Jets FC	2024–25	A-League Men	2	0	2	0	—		—		4	0
Newcastle Jets FC	2025-26	A-League Men	5	0	3	0	—		—		7	0
Newcastle Jets FC	Newcastle Jets Sub-Total		7	0	5	0	0	0	0	0	12	0
Career total			68	3	5	0	0	0	0	0	73	5

== Honours ==
Newcastle Jets FC

- Australia Cup Champions: 2025
