= Aleksandar Šušnjar =

Australian soccer player (born 1995)

Personal information
- Full name: Aleksandar Šušnjar
- Date of birth: 19 August 1995 (age 31)
- Place of birth: Perth, Australia
- Height: 1.91 m (6 ft 3 in)
- Position: Centre back

Team information
- Current team: Lokomotiv Tashkent
- Number: 15

Youth career
- 2015: Perth Glory

Senior career*
Years	Team	Apps	(Gls)
2013–2014	Ekranas	30	(5)
2015	Perth	4	(1)
2016	Lietava Jonava	14	(1)
2016–2017	Gaz Metan Mediaș	18	(0)
2017	Teplice	27	(0)
2018–2019	Mladá Boleslav	9	(0)
2018	→ Žilina (loan)	12	(0)
2018	→ Žilina II (loan)	1	(0)
2019	Busan IPark	29	(0)
2020–2023	Macarthur FC	50	(2)
2023	Novi Pazar	3	(0)
2023–2024	Perth Glory	21	(2)
2024–2025	Newcastle Jets	16	(0)
2026–	Lokomotiv Tashkent	11	(0)

International career^{‡}
2011	Serbia U17	1	(0)
2018	Australia U23	3	(0)
2018	Australia	1	(0)
- * Club domestic league appearances and goals as of 13 May 2026 ‡ National team caps and goals as of 23 April 2018

Aleksandar Šušnjar (Serbian Cyrillic: Александар Шушњар, pronounced [alɛ̌ksaːndar ʃûʃɲaːr]; born 19 August 1995) is an Australian professional soccer player who plays as a defender for Lokomotiv Tashkent.

== Club career ==
Born in Perth, Šušnjar made his senior debut in Europe, playing with Lithuanian side Ekranas in A Lyga seasons 2013 and 2014. Then he returned to Australia and played with Perth SC in the 2015 National Premier Leagues. Next he signed with Lietava Jonava playing with them in the 2016 A Lyga. Romanian Liga I club Gaz Metan Mediaș signed him and Šušnjar played with them until the winter-break when he moved to Czech Republic and joined FK Teplice. A year later, another Czech First League signed him, Mladá Boleslav. On 24 July 2018, he joined MŠK Žilina on a six-month loan deal. Susnjar then moved to Busan IPark in South Korea's K League on 28 February 2019.

In October 2020, Šušnjar joined A-League expansion club Macarthur FC. In May 2023, he left the club.

In September 2023, Šušnjar returned to the A-League Men, joining Perth Glory.

In May 2024, it was announced Šušnjar left Perth Glory to join Newcastle Jets.

On 22 December 2025, the club announced the immediate departure of Šušnjar by mutual agreement.

== International career ==
Šušnjar initially represented Serbia, having made one appearance in 2011 for the Serbian U-17 side. However, by January 2018, he already called the attention of the Australian FA and made a debut for the Australian U23 team.

He received his first senior call up when he was selected in Bert van Marwijk's first Socceroos squad for the March 2018 friendlies. He made the debut for the Australian national team in a friendly game against Norway played on 23 March 2018, but has not made any future appearances for the Australian team after 2018.

== Personal life ==
In addition to his native English, Šušnjar can also speak Serbian, Lithuanian, Czech and can get by in Romanian. He has been often confused with same named Serbian footballer, who previously played with Donji Srem in the Serbian First League, along with older brother, Milan.
