= Lachlan Bayliss =

New Zealand association footballer

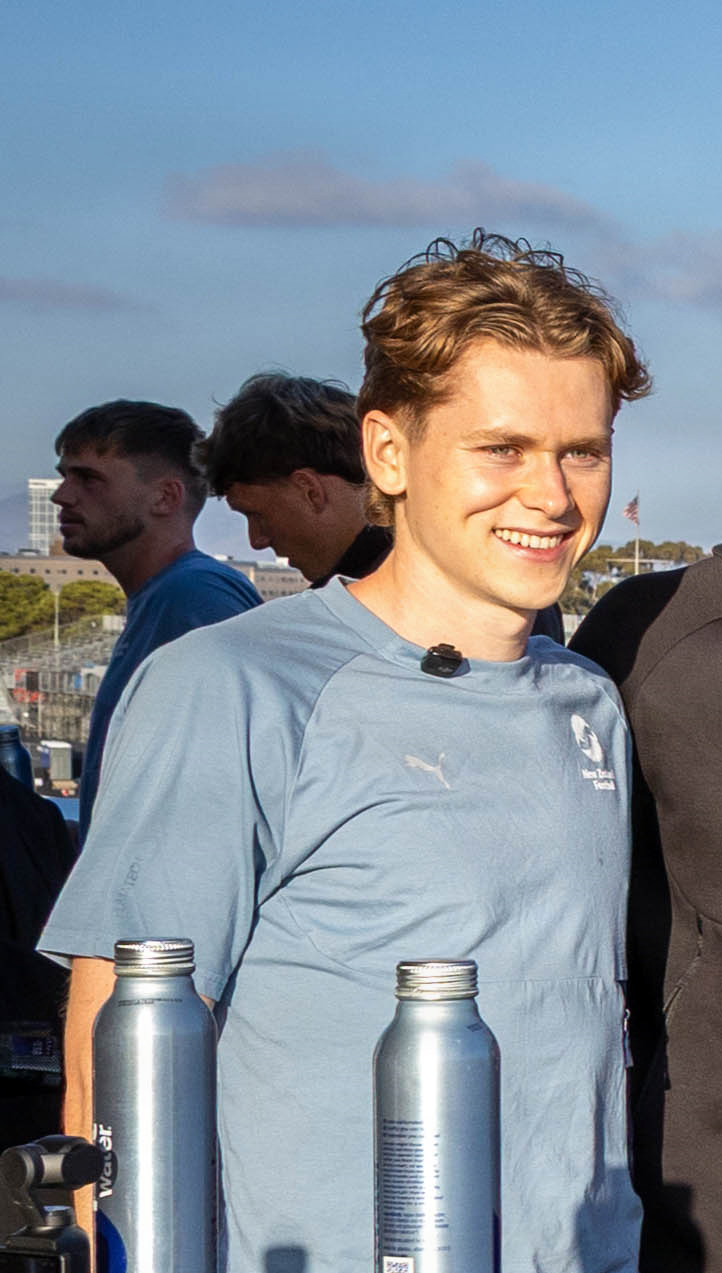
- Bayliss in June 2026.

Personal information
- Full name: Lachlan Ryan Bayliss
- Date of birth: 24 July 2002 (age 24)
- Place of birth: Darwin, Northern Territory, Australia
- Height: 1.78 m (5 ft 10 in)
- Position: Central midfielder

Team information
- Current team: Auckland FC
- Number: 10

Youth career
- Mindil Aces
- Newcastle Jets
- 2018–2023: Central Coast Mariners

Senior career*
| Years | Team | Apps | (Gls) |
| 2022–2023 | CCM Academy | 46 | (23) |
| 2023–2026 | Newcastle Jets | 62 | (6) |
| 2026– | Auckland FC | 4 | (2) |

International career^{‡}
| 2024 | New Zealand U23 | 3 | (0) |
| 2026– | New Zealand | 7 | (1) |
- * Club domestic league appearances and goals as of 7 November 2026 ‡ National team caps and goals as of 12 November 2026

Lachlan Ryan Bayliss (born 24 July 2002) is a professional footballer who plays as a central midfielder for A-League Men side Auckland FC. Born in Australia, he represents the New Zealand national team.

== Club career ==
Bayliss' formative years as a footballer were spent in Darwin, Northern Territory, spending 4 years playing at youth level for Mindil Aces, before joining the youth set up at Central Coast Mariners as a 16 year old in 2018.

=== Central Coast Mariners ===
Having come through the age groups for the Central Coast Mariners Academy, Bayliss was promoted into the NPL First Grade team for the Mariners for the 2022 season, with the Mariners competing in the newly renamed NSW League One competition, the second tier in the National Premier Leagues NSW system. Bayliss made an immediate impact for the team, ending the season as the equal top scorer in the competition with 13 goals in 22 appearances. The season saw the team win the Premiership for finishing top of the table and achieve promotion to the top flight, however losing the Grand Final 2–1 after extra time to St George City.

In January 2023, Bayliss was signed on a scholarship contract with the Mariners, joining his older brother James in training with the Mariners first team squad for the 2022–23 season. Bayliss continued his fine form into the 2023 NPL season, with the team now competing in the top flight following the previous season's promotion. Bayliss was a key member of the team, scoring 9 goals in 21 appearances. Bayliss had a standout performance against North West Sydney Spirit at Pluim Park, being involved in all 4 goals for the side in a 4–2 victory, initially with two assists and then scoring two goals in two minutes late in the match to secure the victory from a position of 2–2. However, that match would be his penultimate appearance for the club, appearing one final time against Sydney FC Youth. Bayliss scored again in his farewell match, and was clapped off by teammates and supporters at the end of the match.

His departure from the club was confirmed the following day.

=== Newcastle Jets ===
Following his surprise release from the Mariners, it was announced the following day that Bayliss had signed for F3 Derby rivals, Newcastle Jets.

On 17 July 2023, Bayliss made his professional debut in an Australia Cup play-off match against Melbourne Victory at Larrakia Park in Darwin, coming off the bench as Newcastle won on penalties to qualify for the 2023 Australia Cup round of 32. Bayliss also made his A-League debut in Newcastle's opening match of the season, a 2–2 away draw against Perth Glory. Newcastle Jets would announce on 24 June 2024, Bayliss had signed a contract extension for 2 more years. Bayliss scored his first professional goal in round eight of the 2024–25 A-League in a 4–0 win over Perth Glory. Bayliss featured in all 26 league matches, starting 19 of them.

Bayliss contributed to Newcastle Jets’ second major trophy, making four appearances during their victorious 2025 Australia Cup campaign. On 23 January 2026, Bayliss scored after just 21 seconds in a 4–1 win over Wellington Phoenix, becoming the scorer of the second-fastest goal in A-League Men history behind Louis Brain. He later assisted Eli Adams during the match.

Bayliss and the Jets would go on to win their second title of the season, winning the A-League Men Premier's Plate on 19 April 2026 following Auckland FC's 1–0 loss to the Central Coast Mariners. Bayliss scored 5 goals and registered 3 assists during the regular season in 27 appearances. On 28 May 2026, the club confirmed that Bayliss would depart the club at the expiration of his contract at the end of the 2025–26 season.

=== Auckland FC ===
On 24 June 2026, Bayliss joined fellow A-League Men side Auckland FC on a free transfer. On 26 August, Bayliss made his debut for the club in the FIFA Intercontinental Cup, starting in their 1–0 loss to Al-Ahli at the King Abdullah Sports City Stadium.

Bayliss made his A-League Men debut for the club on 17 October, scoring twice in a 3–1 win over Melbourne City at Mount Smart Stadium. His first goal was a 35-metre chip over goalkeeper Macklin Freke.

== International career ==
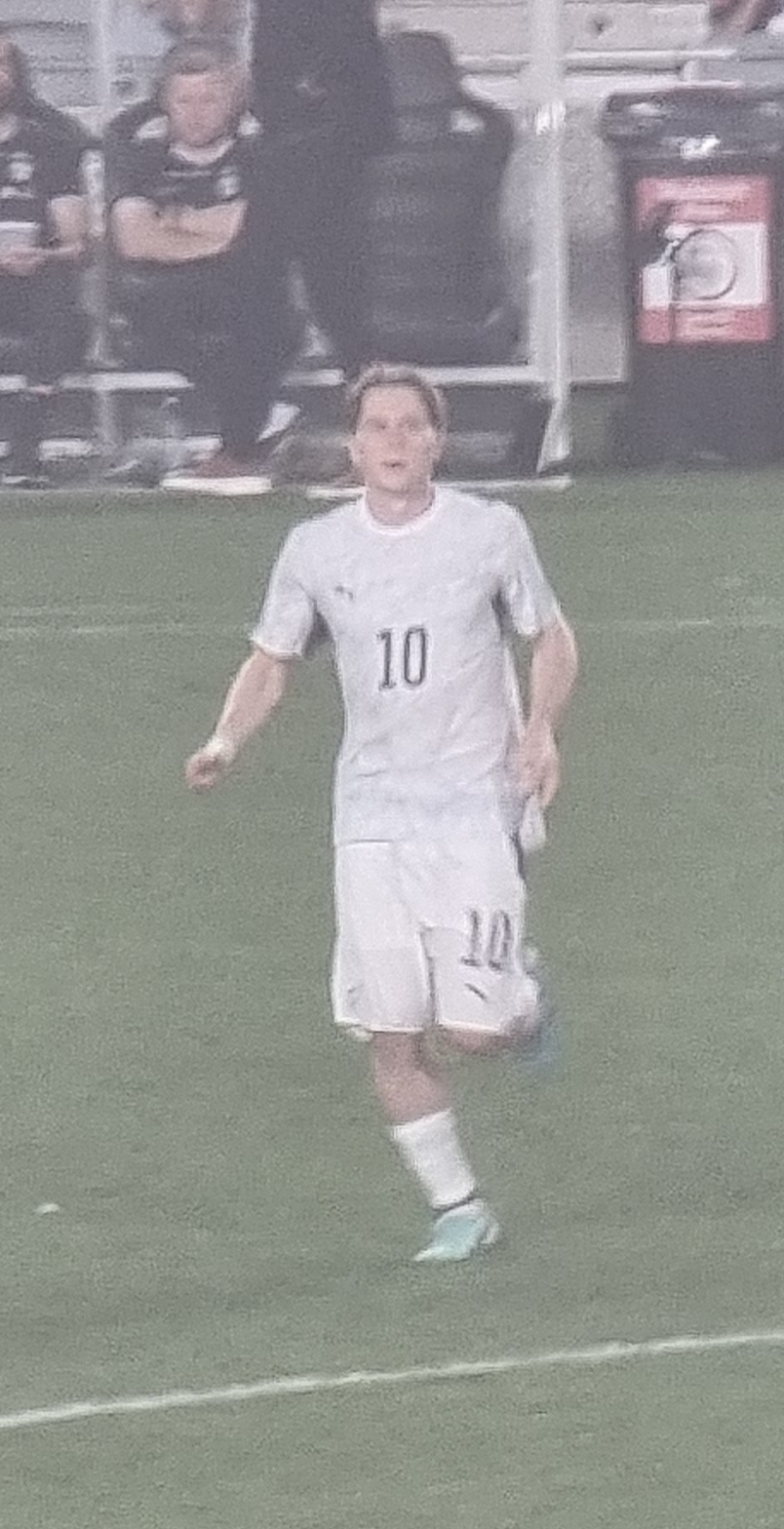
Bayliss making his debut for the All Whites in March 2026.

Bayliss was eligible to represent both Australia and New Zealand, through his father being born in New Zealand.

In August 2023, Bayliss was called up to New Zealand U23 squad for OFC Olympic qualification matches against Papua New Guinea and Fiji. In July 2024, he was named as an alternate player for the New Zealand Olympic football team. On 23 July 2024, Bayliss was announced as being included in the squad proper after Riley Bidois withdrew due to injury and he subsequently appeared in all three of New Zealand's matches.

On 16 March 2026, Bayliss earned his maiden call-up to the All Whites for the FIFA Series, where the team were scheduled to face Finland and Chile. Bayliss made his debut in a 0–2 loss to Finland.

Bayliss was called up to the New Zealand squad for their two-match series against India. He started in New Zealand's 5–0 victory over India at Go Media Stadium, scoring his first international goal.

On 14 May 2026, he was named in the 26-man squad for the 2026 FIFA World Cup.

== Personal life ==
Bayliss' brother James also played for the Central Coast Mariners, making 13 A-League appearances and also played for Auckland FC in during the 2026 OFC Professional League. The brothers featured together in the Mariners NPL first grade sides in 2022 and 2023.

They are not related to three-time Superbike World Champion Troy Bayliss.

== Career statistics ==
=== Club ===
As of 10 November 2026

Appearances and goals by club, season and competition
| Club | Season | League | | | Cup (Note: Appearances in Australia Cup) | | Continental | | Other | | Total | |
| Club | Season | Division | Apps | Goals | Apps | Goals | Apps | Goals | Apps | Goals | Apps | Goals |
|---|---|---|---|---|---|---|---|---|---|---|---|---|
| Central Coast Mariners Academy | 2022 | Football NSW League One | 25 | 14 | — | | — | | — | | 25 | 14 |
| Central Coast Mariners Academy | 2023 | NPL NSW | 21 | 9 | — | | — | | — | | 21 | 9 |
| Central Coast Mariners Academy | Total | | 46 | 23 | 0 | 0 | 0 | 0 | 0 | 0 | 46 | 23 |
| Newcastle Jets | 2023–24 | A-League Men | 11 | 0 | 2 | 0 | — | | 0 | 0 | 13 | 0 |
| Newcastle Jets | 2024–25 | A-League Men | 26 | 1 | 1 | 0 | — | | 0 | 0 | 27 | 1 |
| Newcastle Jets | 2025–26 | A-League Men | 25 | 5 | 4 | 0 | — | | 2 (Note: Appearances in A-League Finals) | 0 | 31 | 5 |
| Newcastle Jets | Total | | 62 | 6 | 7 | 0 | 0 | 0 | 0 | 0 | 71 | 6 |
| Auckland FC | 2026–27 | A-League Men | 4 | 2 | — | | 1 (Note: Appearance in FIFA Intercontinental Cup) | 0 | 0 | 0 | 5 | 2 |
| Career total | | | 115 | 31 | 7 | 0 | 1 | 0 | 0 | 0 | 122 | 31 |

=== International ===
As of match played 12 November 2026

Appearances and goals by national team and year
| National team | Year | Apps | Goals |
|---|---|---|---|
| New Zealand | 2026 | 7 | 1 |
| Total | | 7 | 1 |

Scores and results list New Zealand's goal tally first, score column indicates score after each Bayliss goal.

List of international goals scored by Lachlan Bayliss
| No. | Date | Venue | Opponent | Score | Result | Competition |
|---|---|---|---|---|---|---|
| 1 | 12 November 2026 | Go Media Stadium, Auckland, New Zealand | India | 5–0 | 5–0 | Friendly |

== Honours ==
=== Club ===
Newcastle Jets

- A-League Men – Premier's Plate (1): 2025–26.
- Australia Cup (1): 2025.
- A-League Men Goal of the Month: January 2026
