= 2022 Football NSW season =

Football season in New South Wales

Football New South Wales
- Season: 2022

The Football NSW 2022 season is the tenth season of soccer in New South Wales under the banner of the National Premier Leagues. The competition consists of four divisions across the state of New South Wales.

A restructuring of Football NSW competitions is taking place where the top 4 teams of League One are promoted to the NPL, the top 8 of League Two are promoted to the League One and all 11 of the League Three teams will be promoted to League Two, creating two 16-team leagues and one 15-team league.

== Competitions ==
=== 2022 National Premier League NSW Men's ===
NPL NSW Men's
- Season: 2022
- Champions: Blacktown City
- Premiers: Sydney Olympic
- Relegated: none
- Top goalscorer: Roy O'Donovan (Sydney Olympic) (21 goals)
- Biggest home win: Sydney Olympic 4–0 Mt Druitt Town Rangers (7 May 2022)
- Biggest away win: Sydney United 58 1–6 Sydney FC Youth (1 May 2022); Manly United 1–6 Blacktown City (9 July 2022)
- Highest scoring: Northbridge 2–6 Sydney FC Youth (21 May 2022); Mt Druitt Town Rangers 3–5 APIA Leichhardt (16 March 2022); Marconi Stallions 5–3 Sydney FC Youth (28 May 2022)

==== League table ====
Pos	Team	Pld	W	D	L	GF	GA	GD	Pts	Qualification or relegation
1	Sydney Olympic	22	12	5	5	40	27	+13	41	2022 NPL NSW Finals
2	Manly United	22	12	5	5	36	24	+12	41	2022 NPL NSW Finals
3	Blacktown City (C)	22	12	4	6	43	25	+18	40	2022 NPL NSW Finals
4	Marconi Stallions	22	11	7	4	43	31	+12	40	2022 NPL NSW Finals
5	APIA Leichhardt Tigers	22	10	5	7	41	33	+8	35	2022 NPL NSW Finals
6	Rockdale Ilinden	22	10	5	7	39	36	+3	35	
7	Sydney FC Youth	22	8	8	6	53	45	+8	32	
8	Sydney United 58	22	8	5	9	32	42	−10	29	
9	Wollongong Wolves	22	4	8	10	37	42	−5	20	
10	Mt Druitt Town Rangers	22	4	7	11	37	52	−15	19	
11	Northbridge Bulls	22	5	3	14	32	57	−25	18	
12	Sutherland Sharks	22	3	4	15	28	47	−19	13	

Source: Ladder
Rules for classification: 1) points; 2) goal difference; 3) number of goals scored.
(C) Champions

==== Results ====
Home \ Away	ALT	BLC	MUT	MST	MDT	NBB	RCS	SFY	SYO	SYU	SUT	WOL
APIA Leichhardt Tigers	—	1–0	1–0	2–0	4–1	0–2	2–0	1–1	0–1	1–3	3–0	2–0
Blacktown City	0–1	—	3–1	2–2	4–2	3–0	1–0	4–2	1–2	1–2	1–0	4–1
Manly United	4–1	1–6	—	0–1	2–0	3–0	3–1	0–0	0–0	1–0	2–1	2–0
Marconi Stallions	4–1	1–1	1–1	—	1–1	2–2	2–2	5–3	1–2	4–2	2–1	2–0
Mt Druitt Town Rangers	3–5	1–1	2–4	2–4	—	4–2	1–1	1–1	2–3	2–2	2–3	4–3
Northbridge Bulls	3–3	1–3	0–3	1–3	1–0	—	2–1	2–6	2–4	4–2	1–2	0–4
Rockdale Ilinden	2–1	0–3	0–1	3–1	2–2	4–2	—	2–1	1–3	3–3	3–2	2–1
Sydney FC Youth	4–3	2–2	2–2	1–0	0–3	3–2	3–4	—	3–1	0–1	3–3	3–3
Sydney Olympic	0–4	2–0	0–1	2–3	4–0	2–0	1–1	0–3	—	0–0	4–1	1–1
Sydney United 58	2–2	0–1	2–4	0–1	2–2	1–0	0–2	1–6	0–3	—	1–0	1–0
Sutherland Sharks	1–1	0–1	2–0	2–3	0–2	2–2	0–3	3–4	0–2	2–3	—	0–1
Wollongong Wolves	2–2	3–1	1–1	0–0	3–0	2–3	1–2	2–2	3–3	3–4	3–3	—

Legend: Blue = home team win; Yellow = draw; Red = away team win.
For upcoming matches, an "a" indicates there is an article about the rivalry between the two participants.

==== Finals ====
Qualifying Final
2	Manly United (a.e.t.)	2
3	Blacktown City	1
4	Marconi Stallions	0
5	APIA Leichhardt	1

Major Semi-Final
1	Sydney Olympic	1 (3)
2	Manly United	1 (4)
Minor Semi-Final
3	Blacktown City	2
5	APIA Leichhardt	0

Preliminary final
1	Sydney Olympic	1 (4)
3	Blacktown City	1 (5)

Grand Final
2	Manly United	0
3	Blacktown City	2

=== 2022 NSW League One ===
NSW League One
- Season: 2022
- Champions: St George City
- Premiers: Central Coast Mariners Academy
- Promoted: Central Coast Mariners Academy, NWS Spirit, St George City, Western Sydney Wanderers Youth
- Relegated: none
- Top goalscorer: Lachlan Bayliss (Central Coast Mariners Academy), Emmanuel Gonzalez (Blacktown Spartans) (13 goals)
- Biggest home win: (6 goal margin); 4 games
- Biggest away win: Hakoah Sydney City East 0–6 St George FC (28 May 2022)
- Highest scoring: Northern Tigers 8–2 Blacktown Spartans (12 March 2022)

==== League Table ====
Pos	Team	Pld	W	D	L	GF	GA	GD	Pts	Qualification or relegation
1	Central Coast Mariners Academy (P)	22	14	5	3	48	17	+31	47	Promotion to the 2023 NPL NSW and 2022 League One Finals
2	St George City (C, P)	22	14	5	3	46	24	+22	47	Promotion to the 2023 NPL NSW and 2022 League One Finals
3	Western Sydney Wanderers Youth (P)	22	15	3	4	68	31	+37	45 (Note: Western Sydney Wanderers FC Youth had 3 points deducted due to spectator incidents)	Promotion to the 2023 NPL NSW and 2022 League One Finals
4	NWS Spirit (P)	22	13	6	3	41	19	+22	45	Promotion to the 2023 NPL NSW and 2022 League One Finals
5	Northern Tigers	22	10	3	9	40	35	+5	33	2022 League One Finals
6	Hakoah Sydney City East	22	8	6	8	32	41	−9	30	
7	Blacktown Spartans	21	6	7	8	29	38	−9	25	
8	Bonnyrigg White Eagles	20	6	5	9	28	29	−1	23	
9	St George FC	21	6	3	12	31	39	−8	21	
10	Mounties Wanderers	22	6	2	14	25	51	−26	20	
11	SD Raiders	22	5	2	15	25	50	−25	17	
12	Hills United	22	3	1	18	23	62	−39	10	

Source: Ladder
Rules for classification: 1) points; 2) goal difference; 3) number of goals scored.
(C) Champions; (P) Promoted

==== Finals ====
Qualifying Final
2	St George City	2
3	Western Sydney Wanderers Youth	1
4	NWS Spirit	1
5	Northern Tigers	2

Major Semi-Final
1	Central Coast Mariners Academy	1
2	St George City (a.e.t.)	2
Minor Semi-Final
3	Western Sydney Wanderers Youth	0
Northern Tigers	5

Preliminary final
Central Coast Mariners Academy	2
Northern Tigers	0

Grand Final
St George City (a.e.t.)	2
Central Coast Mariners Academy	1

=== 2022 NSW League Two ===
NSW League Two
- Season: 2022
- Premiers: Inter Lions
- Promoted: Bankstown City Lions, Canterbury Bankstown, Central Coast United, Dulwich Hill, Dunbar Rovers, Inter Lions, Macarthur Rams, Rydalmere Lions
- Relegated: none
- Top goalscorer: Ahmad Taleb (Rydalmere Lions), Bonmyeong Koo (Canterbury Bankstown) (19 goals)
- Biggest home win: Dulwich Hill 5–0 Inner West Hawks (9 April 2022); Bankstown City Lions 5–0 Macarthur Rams (9 April 2022)
- Biggest away win: Bankstown United 0–5 Bankstown City Lions (14 May 2022)
- Highest scoring: (8 goals); 4 games

==== League Table ====
Pos	Team	Pld	W	D	L	GF	GA	GD	Pts	Qualification or relegation
1	Inter Lions (P)	22	15	3	4	63	38	+25	48	Promotion to the 2023 NSW League One and 2022 League Two Finals
2	Central Coast United (P)	22	13	4	5	49	34	+15	43	Promotion to the 2023 NSW League One and 2022 League Two Finals
3	Rydalmere Lions (P)	22	12	5	5	52	36	+16	41	Promotion to the 2023 NSW League One and 2022 League Two Finals
4	Canterbury Bankstown (P)	22	12	2	8	48	37	+11	38	Promotion to the 2023 NSW League One and 2022 League Two Finals
5	Macarthur Rams (P, C)	22	11	5	6	38	33	+5	38	Promotion to the 2023 NSW League One and 2022 League Two Finals
6	Bankstown City Lions (P)	22	12	1	9	44	38	+6	37	Promotion to the 2023 NSW League One
7	Dulwich Hill (P)	22	9	6	7	42	35	+7	33	Promotion to the 2023 NSW League One
8	Dunbar Rovers (P)	22	8	4	10	32	33	−1	28	Promotion to the 2023 NSW League One
9	Gladesville Ryde Magic	22	5	8	9	35	46	−11	23	
10	Sydney University	22	5	4	13	30	40	−10	19	
11	Bankstown United	22	3	5	14	16	42	−26	14	
12	Inner West Hawks	22	3	1	18	24	61	−37	10	

Source: Ladder
Rules for classification: 1) points; 2) goal difference; 3) number of goals scored.
(C) Champions; (P) Promoted

==== Finals ====
Qualifying Final
2	Central Coast United	2
3	Rydalmere Lions (a.e.t.)	3
4	Canterbury Bankstown	2 (2)
5	Macarthur Rams (p)	2 (4)

Major Semi-Final
1	Inter Lions	3
3	Rydalmere Lions	0
Minor Semi-Final
2	Central Coast United	1
Macarthur Rams	4

Preliminary final
Rydalmere Lions	2
Macarthur Rams	3

Grand Final
Inter Lions	1
Macarthur Rams	2

=== 2022 NSW League Three ===
NSW League Three
- Season: 2022
- Promoted: All teams
- Top goalscorer: Kevin Lopes (UNSW FC) (15 goals)
- Biggest home win: (4 goal margin); 4 games
- Biggest away win: Fraser Park 0–8 Newcastle Jets Youth (19 March 2022)
- Highest scoring: Fraser Park 0–8 Newcastle Jets Youth (19 March 2022); Western Rage 2–6 UNSW FC (30 April 2022)

==== League Table ====
Pos	Team	Pld	W	D	L	GF	GA	GD	Pts	Qualification or relegation
1	Newcastle Jets Youth (P, C)	19	12	5	2	55	23	+32	41	Promotion to the 2023 NSW League Two and 2022 League Three Finals
2	Nepean FC (P)	20	10	6	4	36	23	+13	36	Promotion to the 2023 NSW League Two and 2022 League Three Finals
3	Hawkesbury City (P)	19	11	3	5	38	26	+12	36	Promotion to the 2023 NSW League Two and 2022 League Three Finals
4	UNSW (P)	20	10	5	5	56	30	+26	35	Promotion to the 2023 NSW League Two and 2022 League Three Finals
5	Prospect United (P)	20	9	4	7	36	35	+1	31	Promotion to the 2023 NSW League Two and 2022 League Three Finals
6	Hurstville FC (P)	20	8	7	5	30	29	+1	31	Promotion to the 2023 NSW League Two
7	Camden Tigers (P)	20	6	5	9	34	44	−10	23	Promotion to the 2023 NSW League Two
8	Fraser Park (P)	20	6	2	12	22	56	−34	20	Promotion to the 2023 NSW League Two
9	South Coast Flame (P)	20	5	4	11	35	45	−10	19	Promotion to the 2023 NSW League Two
10	Parramatta FC (P)	20	5	3	12	23	35	−12	18	Promotion to the 2023 NSW League Two
11	Western Rage (P)	20	4	2	14	35	54	−19	14	Promotion to the 2023 NSW League Two

Source: Ladder
Rules for classification: 1) points; 2) goal difference; 3) number of goals scored.
(C) Champions; (P) Promoted

==== Finals ====
Qualifying Final
2	Nepean FC (a.e.t.)	3
3	Hawkesbury City	2
4	UNSW	0
5	Prospect United	1

Major Semi-Final
1	Newcastle Jets Youth (p)	0 (5)
2	Nepean FC	0 (3)
Minor Semi-Final
3	Hawkesbury City	1
5	Prospect United	5

Preliminary final
Nepean FC	1
Prospect United	0

Grand Final
Newcastle Jets Youth
Nepean FC

=== 2022 National Premier Leagues NSW Women's ===
National Premier Leagues NSW Women's
- Season: 2022
- Champions: Macarthur Rams
- Premiers: Sydney University

The 2022 National Premier Leagues NSW Women's was the ninth edition of the NPL NSW Women's competition to be incorporated under the National Premier Leagues banner. 12 teams competed, playing each other twice for a total of 22 rounds. The top four teams played-off in a finals series.

==== League Table ====
Pos	Team	Pld	W	D	L	GF	GA	GD	Pts	
1	Sydney University	22	16	3	3	37	14	+23	51	2022 NPL NSW Women's Finals
2	APIA Leichhardt Tigers	22	12	4	6	48	25	+23	40	2022 NPL NSW Women's Finals
3	Macarthur Rams (C)	22	12	4	6	41	25	+16	40	2022 NPL NSW Women's Finals
4	Northern Tigers	22	10	8	4	47	28	+19	38	2022 NPL NSW Women's Finals
5	Sydney Olympic	22	11	3	8	42	28	+14	36	
6	Bankstown City	22	10	4	8	34	33	+1	34	
7	Manly United	22	7	10	5	40	33	+7	31	
8	Illawarra Stingrays	22	8	5	9	35	37	−2	29	
9	North West Sydney Koalas	22	7	4	11	31	42	−11	25	
10	Blacktown Spartans	22	7	3	12	25	36	−11	24	
11	Football NSW Institute	22	4	5	13	19	36	−17	17	
12	Emerging Jets	22	1	1	20	16	78	−62	4	

Source: Ladder
Rules for classification: 1) points; 2) goal difference; 3) number of goals scored.
(C) Champions

==== Finals ====
Semi-Final
1	Sydney University	0
4	Northern Tigers	3
2	APIA Leichhardt Tigers	1
3	Macarthur Rams	2

Grand Final
Northern Tigers	0 (5)
Macarthur Rams (p)	0 (6)

== 2022 Waratah Cup ==
Football NSW soccer clubs competed in 2022 for the Waratah Cup. The tournament doubled as the NSW qualifier for the 2022 Australia Cup, with the top four clubs progressing to the Round of 32. A total of 162 clubs entered the qualifying phase, with the clubs entering in a staggered format.

The Cup was won by NWS Spirit, their first title.

In addition to four of the five NSW-based A-League clubs (Central Coast Mariners, Sydney FC, Newcastle Jets and Macarthur FC), the four qualifiers (Bonnyrigg White Eagles, NWS Spirit, Sydney United 58 and Wollongong United) entered into the final rounds of the 2022 Australia Cup.

== End of Year awards ==
The End of Year awards took place on 16 September 2022.

Award	Men's	Women's
Goal of the Year	Bruno Mendes (Manly United)	—
Fair Play Award	Sydney FC Youth	FNSW Institute
Club Championship	Blacktown City FC	Sydney University SFC
Referee of the Year	Hassan Jomaa	Mikayla Ryan
Goalkeeper of the Year	Jack Greenwood (Manly United)	Courtney Newbon (Sydney University SFC)
Coach of the Year	Adam Griffiths (Manly United)	Emily Husband (Sydney University SFC)
Golden Boot Awards	Men's: Roy O'Donovan (Sydney Olympic; 21 goals) 20's: Mabior Garang (Mt Druitt Town Rangers; 18 goals)	Women's: Shea Connors (APIA Leichhardt; 15 goals) Reserves: Stephanie Augoustis (Sydney University SFC; 21 goals)
Player of the Year	Men's: Jaiden Kucharski (Sydney FC Youth) 20's: Luka Smyth (Sydney FC Youth)	Women's: Rola Badawiya (Sydney University SFC) Reserves: Siena Arrate (FNSW Institute)
