= 2026–27 Newcastle Jets FC season =

Newcastle Jets
2026–27 season
- Owner: Maverick Sports Partners (100%)
- Chairman: Maurice Bisetto
- Head Coach: Mark Milligan
- Stadium: McDonald Jones Stadium
- A-League Men: 11th
- Australia Cup: Round of 32
- AFC Champions League Elite: League Stage
- Top goalscorer: League: Xavier Bertoncello; Nikos Vergos; Patrick Wood (1 goal each); All: Patrick Wood (5 goals)
- Highest home attendance: 7,293 vs. Macarthur FC (24 October 2026); A-League Men
- Lowest home attendance: 4,558 vs. Wellington Phoenix (31 October 2026); A-League Men
- Average home league attendance: 5,926
- Biggest defeat: 1–7 vs. Kashima Antlers (A) (15 September 2026); AFC Champions League Elite
Home colours	Away colours	Third colours
- All statistics correct as of 7 November 2026.

The 2026–27 season is the Newcastle Jets Football Club's 26th season since its establishment in 2000. Newcastle Jets is participating in the A-League Men for the 22nd season, and in the Australia Cup for the eleventh time.

== Players ==
Note: Flags indicate national team as defined under FIFA eligibility rules; some limited exceptions apply. Players may hold more than one non-FIFA nationality.

No.	Pos.	Nation	Player
1	GK	AUS	James Delianov
2	DF	AUS	Alex Grant
5	DF	IRL	Joe Shaughnessy (vice-captain)
6	MF	AUS	Zane Schreiber
8	FW	AUS	Patrick Wood
9	FW	GRE	Nikos Vergos
10	MF	ENG	Zach Clough
11	FW	ENG	Joe Lolley
14	MF	AUS	Max Burgess (captain)
16	DF	AUS	Will Kennedy
17	FW	MLT	Ethan Debono
19	MF	AUS	Alexander Badolato
20	GK	AUS	Alex Nassiep
22	DF	AUS	Joel Bertolissio

No.	Pos.	Nation	Player
23	DF	AUS	Daniel Wilmering
24	MF	AUS	Alex Nunes (scholarship)
25	FW	AUS	Oscar Fryer (scholarship)
26	FW	AUS	Oscar Gonzalez
27	MF	AUS	Julian Recchia (scholarship)
28	MF	AUS	Will Dobson
37	FW	AUS	Oliver Cockle (scholarship)
39	DF	AUS	Thomas Aquilina
40	GK	AUS	Jordan Baylis (scholarship)
42	DF	AUS	Max Cooper (scholarship)
43	FW	AUS	Xavier Bertoncello (scholarship)
52	MF	AUS	Nicholas Badolato (scholarship)
54	FW	AUS	Jake Goodwin (scholarship)
61	DF	AUS	Angus Reid (scholarship)

== Transfers and contracts ==
=== Transfers in ===
No.	Position	Name	From	Type/fee	Contract length	Date	Ref.
9	FW	(Greece) Nikos Vergos	Melbourne Victory	Free transfer	2 years	1 July 2026	
6	MF	Zane Schreiber	Melbourne City	Free transfer	1 year	1 July 2026	
8	FW	Patrick Wood	Sydney FC	Free transfer	2 years	1 July 2026	
11	FW	(England) Joe Lolley	Sydney FC	Free transfer	2 years	1 July 2026	
26	FW	Oscar Gonzalez	(Australia) APIA Leichhardt	Free transfer	2 years	2 July 2026	
16	DF	Will Kennedy	Central Coast Mariners FC	Free transfer	2 years	3 July 2026	
2	DF	Alex Grant	Sydney FC	Free transfer	1 year	20 July 2026	
27	MF	Julian Recchia	Melbourne City NPL	Free transfer	1 year scholarship	14 September 2026	

==== From youth squad ====
N	Pos.	Nat.	Name	Age	Notes
37	FW	(Australia)	Oliver Cockle	18	Scholarship contract
40	GK	(Australia)	Jordan Baylis	20	Scholarship contract
17	FW	(Malta)	Ethan Debono	20	1-year contract
52	MF	(Australia)	Nicholas Badolato	18	Scholarship contract
61	DF	(Australia)	Angus Reid	19	Scholarship contract
54	FW	(Australia)	Jake Goodwin	19	Scholarship contract

=== Transfers out ===
No.	Position	Name	To	Type/fee	Date	Ref.
8	MF	(New Zealand) Lachlan Bayliss	Auckland FC	End of contract	30 June 2026	
9	FW	Lachlan Rose	(Scotland) Dundee United	End of contract	30 June 2026	
11	FW	Ben Gibson	Macarthur FC	End of contract	30 June 2026	
13	FW	Clayton Taylor	(England) Barnsley	End of contract (compensation fee)	30 June 2026	
17	MF	Kosta Grozos	Macarthur FC	End of contract	30 June 2026	
18	FW	(Japan) Kota Mizunuma	(Japan) Urawa Red Diamonds	End of contract	30 June 2026	
21	GK	Noah James	Unattached	End of contract	30 June 2026	
33	DF	Mark Natta	Unattached	End of contract	30 June 2026	
34	DF	Richard Nkomo	(Australia) South Melbourne	End of contract	30 June 2026	
41	MF	(Malta) Lucas Scicluna	Perth Glory	End of contract	30 June 2026	
44	DF	Ben van Dorssen	Unattached	End of contract	30 June 2026	
45	MF	Christian Bracco	Unattached	End of contract	30 June 2026	
7	FW	Eli Adams	(Japan) Gamba Osaka	Undisclosed	2 July 2026	

=== Contract extensions ===
No.	Name	Position	Duration	Date	Notes
24	Alex Nunes	Attacking midfielder	2 years	5 June 2026	
39	Thomas Aquilina	Right-back	2 years	23 June 2026	
20	Alex Nassiep	Goalkeeper	2 years	24 June 2026	
5	(Republic of Ireland) Joe Shaughnessy	Central defender	1 year	25 June 2026	
25	Oscar Fryer	Winger	1 year	27 June 2026	

== Pre-season and friendlies ==
14 July 2026	Bankstown City (Australia)	0–2	(Australia) Newcastle Jets	Sydney, Australia
19:30		Report	Wood; Dobson	Stadium: Blacktown Exercise Sports and Technology Hub

25 July 2026	Adamstown Rosebuds (Australia)	0–3	(Australia) Newcastle Jets	Adamstown, Australia
10:00		Report	Wilmering; Wood; Clough	Stadium: Adamstown Oval

28 July 2026	Broadmeadow Magic (Australia)	0–7	(Australia) Newcastle Jets	Newcastle, Australia
19:00		Report	Clough; Aquilina; Cockle; Goodwin; Gonzalez; Nunes	Stadium: Magic Park

3 August 2026	Newcastle Jets (Australia)	0–2	(Australia) Macarthur FC	Maitland, Australia
		Report	Gibson; Reec	Stadium: Cooks Square Park

15 August 2026	Western Sydney Wanderers (Australia)	5–4	(Australia) Newcastle Jets	Sydney, Australia
	Waraga; Rose; Gillion	Report	Goal	Attendance: 0 (behind closed doors)

1 September 2026	Melbourne City (Australia)	2–1	(Australia) Newcastle Jets	Melbourne, Australia
	Caputo 10'; Kutleshi	Report	58'	Stadium: City Football Academy; Attendance: 0 (behind closed doors)

8 September 2026	Newcastle Jets (Australia)	2–2	(New Zealand) Auckland FC	Sydney, Australia
	?; ?	Report	Bayliss; Brook	Attendance: 0 (behind closed doors)

27 September 2026	Sydney FC (Australia)	3–4	(Australia) Newcastle Jets	Sydney, Australia
	Toure; Quintal; Alfaro	Report	Goal	Stadium: Sky Park

1 October 2026	Newcastle Jets (Australia)	5–3	(New Zealand) Wellington Phoenix	Sydney, Australia
	Debono; Gonzalez; Morris	Report	Walker; Nagasawa	Stadium: TBC

== Competitions ==
=== Overall record ===
Competition	First match	Last match	Starting round	Final position	Record							
Competition	First match	Last match	Starting round	Final position	Pld	W	D	L	GF	GA	GD	Win %
A-League Men	October 2026	8 May 2027	Matchday 1		4	0	2	2	4	8	−4	0.00
Australia Cup	21 July 2026	21 July 2026	Round of 32	Round of 32	1	0	0	1	2	3	−1	0.00
AFC Champions League Elite	15 September 2026		League stage		4	0	0	4	6	19	−13	0.00
Total					9	0	2	7	12	30	−18	0.00

Last updated: 7 November 2026
Source: Competitions

=== A-League Men ===
==== Results summary ====
Overall								Home						Away					
Pld	W	D	L	GF	GA	GD	Pts	W	D	L	GF	GA	GD	W	D	L	GF	GA	GD
4	0	2	2	4	8	−4	2	0	1	1	1	4	−3	0	1	1	3	4	−1

Last updated: 7 November 2026.
Source: Ultimate A-League

==== Results by round ====
Round	1	2	3	4	5	6
Ground	A	H	H	A	B	B
Result	D	D	L	L	X	X
Position	4	7	11	10	11	
Points	1	2	2	2	2	2

Updated to match(es) played on 7 November 2026. Source: Ultimate A-League
A = Away; H = Home; W = Win; D = Draw; L = Loss; X = Bye

==== League table ====
Pos	Team	Pld	W	D	L	GF	GA	GD	Pts
8	Auckland FC (Note: Auckland FC and Wellington Phoenix cannot qualify for Asian Football Confederation competitions as they are based in New Zealand, which is part of the Oceania Football Confederation.)	5	1	3	1	7	8	−1	6
9	Melbourne Victory	5	0	4	1	6	7	−1	4
10	Central Coast Mariners	5	0	3	2	4	9	−5	3
11	Newcastle Jets	4	0	2	2	4	8	−4	2
12	Adelaide United	4	0	1	3	5	12	−7	1

Updated to match(es) played on 22 November 2026. Source: A-Leagues
Rules for classification: 1) points; 2) goal difference; 3) goals scored; 4) wins; 5) head-to-head results; 5a) head-to-head points; 5b) head-to-head goal difference; 6) Fair Play points; 7) away goal difference; 8) away goals per match; 9) home goal difference; 10) home goals per match; 11) toss of a coin in an event of a tie of two clubs.

==== Matches ====
Win Draw Loss Fixtures

17 October 2026 1	Central Coast Mariners	2–2	Newcastle Jets	Gosford
19:40 AEDT	Auglah 11' (pen.); Lavale 60' (pen.)	Report	Wood 49'; Lavale 78' (o.g.)	Stadium: Polytec Stadium; Attendance: 8,155; Referee: Adam Kersey

24 October 2026 2	Newcastle Jets	1–1	Macarthur FC	Newcastle
15:00 AEDT	Bertoncello 5'	Report	Toure 70'	Stadium: McDonald Jones Stadium; Attendance: 7,293; Referee: Alex King

31 October 2026 3	Newcastle Jets	0–3	Wellington Phoenix	Newcastle
15:00 AEDT		Report	Piper 14'; Bidois 87'; Walker 90+3'	Stadium: McDonald Jones Stadium; Attendance: 4,558; Referee: Eric Saba

7 November 2026 4	Perth Glory	2–1	Newcastle Jets	Perth
18:45 AWST	Kucharski 39', 48'	Report	Vergos 90+2'	Stadium: HBF Park; Attendance: 7,642; Referee: Sam Kelly

12 December 2026 8	Melbourne Victory	v	Newcastle Jets	Melbourne
19:40 AEST				Stadium: AAMI Park

20 December 2026 9	Adelaide United	v	Newcastle Jets	Adelaide
16:30 ACDT		Source		Stadium: Coopers Stadium

2 January 2027 10	Wellington Phoenix	v	Newcastle Jets	Wellington
17:00 NZDT				Stadium: Hnry Stadium

9 January 2027 11	Newcastle Jets	v	Auckland FC	Newcastle
19:00 AEDT		Report		Stadium: McDonald Jones Stadium

9 January 2027 12	Newcastle Jets	v	Auckland FC	Newcastle
19:00 AEDT		Report		Stadium: McDonald Jones Stadium

16 January 2027 13	Sydney FC	v	Newcastle Jets	Sydney
19:40 AEDT		Report		Stadium: Allianz Stadium

19 January 2027 5	Newcastle Jets	v	Melbourne City	Newcastle
19:00 AEDT		Report		Stadium: McDonald Jones Stadium

23 January 2027 14	Newcastle Jets	v	Central Coast Mariners	Newcastle
19:40 AEDT		Report		Stadium: McDonald Jones Stadium

30 January 2027 15	Newcastle Jets	v	Melbourne Victory	Newcastle
17:00 AEST				Stadium: McDonald Jones Stadium

5 February 2027 16	Newcastle Jets	v	Perth Glory	Newcastle
19:40 AEDT		Report		Stadium: McDonald Jones Stadium

13 February 2027 17	Newcastle Jets	v	Brisbane Roar	Newcastle
17:00 AEDT		Report		Stadium: McDonald Jones Stadium

21 February 2027 18	Newcastle Jets	v	Adelaide United	Newcastle
17:00 AEDT		Source		Stadium: McDonald Jones Stadium

13 March 2027 19	Auckland FC	v	Newcastle Jets	Auckland
17:00 NZDT		Report		Stadium: Go Media Stadium

6 March 2027 20	Macarthur FC	v	Newcastle Jets	Sydney
17:00 AEDT		Report		Stadium: Campbelltown Sports Stadium

13 March 2027 21	Auckland FC	v	Newcastle Jets	Auckland
17:00 NZDT		Report		Stadium: Go Media Stadium

20 March 2027 22	Newcastle Jets	v	Sydney FC	Newcastle
19:40 AEDT		Source		Stadium: McDonald Jones Stadium

3 April 2027 23	Perth Glory	v	Newcastle Jets	Perth
18:45 AWST		Report		Stadium: HBF Park

10 April 2027 24	Newcastle Jets	v	Adelaide United	Newcastle
17:00 AEST		Source		Stadium: McDonald Jones Stadium

17 April 2027 25	Wellington Phoenix	v	Newcastle Jets	Wellington
17:00 NZST				Stadium: Hnry Stadium

25 April 2027 26	Newcastle Jets	v	Central Coast Mariners	Newcastle
16:00 AEST				Stadium: McDonald Jones Stadium

30 April 2027 27	Brisbane Roar	v	Newcastle Jets	Brisbane
20:00 AEST		Report		Stadium: Suncorp Stadium

8 May 2027 28	Melbourne City	v	Newcastle Jets	Melbourne
17:00 AEDT		Report		Stadium: AAMI Park

=== Australia Cup ===
21 July 2026 Round of 32	Preston Lions	3–2	Newcastle Jets	Melbourne
19:30	Bonada 56', 62'; Lazarevski 90+3'	Report	Dobson 17'; Vergos 23'	Stadium: Genis Steel Stadium; Attendance: 4,334; Referee: Eric Saba

=== AFC Champions League Elite ===
Pos	Team	Pld	W	D	L	GF	GA	GD	Pts
12	(Thailand) Buriram United	4	0	3	1	2	3	−1	3
13	(Thailand) Port	4	1	0	3	9	14	−5	3
14	(Thailand) Ratchaburi	4	0	1	3	6	10	−4	1
15	(South Korea) Pohang Steelers	4	0	1	3	4	11	−7	1
16	(Australia) Newcastle Jets	4	0	0	4	6	19	−13	0

Updated to match(es) played on 4 November 2026. Source: AFC
Rules for classification: 1) points; 2) goal difference; 3) number of goals scored; 4) number of matches won; 5) penalty shoot-out if only two teams remain tied and played each other on the final matchday 6) fair play ranking; 7) drawing of lots

15 September 2026 1	Kashima Antlers (Japan)	7–1	(Australia) Newcastle Jets	Kashima, Japan
19:00 JST	Čavrić 11', 16', 42'; Delianov 19' (o.g.); Tokuda 40', 56'; Tagawa 73'	Report	Wood 79'	Stadium: Kashima Soccer Stadium; Referee: Khalid Al-Turais (Saudi Arabia)

13 October 2026 2	Newcastle Jets (Australia)	1−3	(Japan) Gamba Osaka	Newcastle, Australia
18:45 AEDT	Vergos 32'	Report	Toshida 40'; Hümmet 73'; Welton 86'	Stadium: Newcastle International Sports Centre; Attendance: 3,219; Referee: Ahmad Al-Ali (Kuwait)

27 October 2026 3	Kyoto Sanga (Japan)	5–2	(Australia) Newcastle Jets	Kameoka, Japan
19:00 JST	Tawiah 45+6'; A. Souza 56', 84'; Túlio 60'; Elias 67'	Report	Wood 13' (pen.), 45+2' (pen.)	Stadium: Kyoto Stadium; Attendance: 4,205; Referee: Kim Jong-hyeok (South Korea)

3 November 2026 4	Newcastle Jets (Australia)	2–4	(China) Shanghai Port	Newcastle, Australia
18:45 AEDT	Wood 58'; Bertoncello 80'	Report	Leonardo 23'; Aquilina 26' (o.g.); Ampem 51'; Li Xinxiang 86'	Stadium: Newcastle International Sports Centre; Attendance: 1,614; Referee: Omar Al-Ali (United Arab Emirates)

24 November 2026 5	Newcastle Jets (Australia)	v	(Japan) Kashiwa Reysol	Gosford, Australia
18:45 AEDT		Source		Stadium: Central Coast Stadium

1 December 2026 6	Vissel Kobe (Japan)	v	(Australia) Newcastle Jets	Kobe, Japan
19:00 JST		Source		Stadium: Kobe City Misaki Park Stadium

9 February 2027 7	Newcastle Jets (Australia)	v	(Malaysia) Johor Darul Ta'zim	Newcastle, Australia
18:45 AEDT		Source		Stadium: Newcastle International Sports Centre

16 February 2027 8	Beijing Guoan (China)	v	(Australia) Newcastle Jets	Beijing, China
18:00 CST		Source		Stadium: Workers' Stadium

== Statistics ==
=== Appearances and goals ===
Includes all competitions. Players with no appearances not included in the list.

As of match played 7 November 2026

No.	Pos	Nat	Player	Total		A-League Men		Australia Cup		AFC Champions League Elite	
No.	Pos	Nat	Player	Apps	Goals	Apps	Goals	Apps	Goals	Apps	Goals
1	GK	(Australia) AUS	James Delianov	9	0	4	0	1	0	4	0
2	DF	(Australia) AUS	Alex Grant	5	0	3	0	1	0	1	0
5	DF	(Republic of Ireland) IRL	Joe Shaughnessy	7	0	3+1	0	0	0	3	0
6	MF	(Australia) AUS	Zane Schreiber	8	0	1+2	0	0+1	0	4	0
8	FW	(Australia) AUS	Patrick Wood	8	5	2+1	1	0+1	0	2+2	4
9	FW	(Greece) GRE	Nikos Vergos	9	3	3+1	1	1	1	2+2	1
10	MF	(England) ENG	Zach Clough	8	0	2+2	0	1	0	2+1	0
11	FW	(England) ENG	Joe Lolley	8	0	2+2	0	0	0	3+1	0
14	MF	(Australia) AUS	Max Burgess	9	0	3+1	0	1	0	4	0
17 (Note: Ethan Debono wears number 17 in the A-League Men and 46 in the AFC Champions League Elite)	FW	(Malta) MLT	Ethan Debono	3	0	0+1	0	0	0	0+2	0
19	MF	(Australia) AUS	Alexander Badolato	4	0	1+2	0	0	0	0+1	0
22	DF	(Australia) AUS	Joel Bertolissio	9	0	2+2	0	1	0	4	0
23	DF	(Australia) AUS	Daniel Wilmering	9	0	4	0	1	0	4	0
24	MF	(Australia) AUS	Alex Nunes	3	0	1	0	1	0	0+1	0
27	MF	(Australia) AUS	Julian Recchia	7	0	2+1	0	0	0	2+2	0
28	MF	(Australia) AUS	Will Dobson	9	1	2+2	0	1	1	2+2	0
37	FW	(Australia) AUS	Oliver Cockle	1	0	0	0	0+1	0	0	0
39	DF	(Australia) AUS	Thomas Aquilina	7	0	3	0	0+1	0	3	0
42	DF	(Australia) AUS	Max Cooper	1	0	0	0	1	0	0	0
43	FW	(Australia) AUS	Xavier Bertoncello	9	2	3+1	1	1	0	3+1	1
52	MF	(Australia) AUS	Nicholas Badolato	1	0	1	0	0	0	0	0
61	DF	(Australia) AUS	Angus Reid	1	0	0	0	0	0	1	0
64	FW	(Australia) AUS	Jesse Hill	2	0	1+1	0	0	0	0	0

=== Disciplinary record ===
Includes all competitions. The list is sorted by squad number when total cards are equal. Players with no cards not included in the list.

As of match played7 November 2026

Rank	No.	Pos.	Nat.	Name	A-League Men			Australia Cup			AFC Champions League Elite			Total		
Rank	No.	Pos.	Nat.	Name	Yellow card	(yellow card) (yellow-red card)	Red card	Yellow card	(yellow card) (yellow-red card)	Red card	Yellow card	(yellow card) (yellow-red card)	Red card	Yellow card	(yellow card) (yellow-red card)	Red card
1	8	FW	(Australia)	Patrick Wood	0	0	0	0	0	0	3	0	0	3	0	0
2	6	MF	(Australia)	Zane Schreiber	1	0	0	0	0	0	1	0	0	2	0	0
2	14	MF	(Australia)	Max Burgess	1	0	0	1	0	0	0	0	0	2	0	0
2	28	MF	(Australia)	Will Dobson	2	0	0	0	0	0	0	0	0	2	0	0
5	5	DF	(Republic of Ireland)	Joe Shaughnessy	0	0	0	0	0	0	1	0	0	1	0	0
5	17 (Note: Ethan Debono wears number 17 in the A-League Men and 46 in the AFC Champions League Elite)	FW	(Malta)	Ethan Debono	0	0	0	0	0	0	1	0	0	1	0	0
5	23	DF	(Australia)	Daniel Wilmering	1	0	0	0	0	0	0	0	0	1	0	0
5	27	MF	(Australia)	Julian Recchia	0	0	0	0	0	0	1	0	0	1	0	0
Player(s) transferred out but featured this season
Total					5	0	0	1	0	0	7	0	0	13	0	0

=== Clean sheets ===
Includes all competitions. The list is sorted by squad number when total clean sheets are equal. Numbers in parentheses represent games where both goalkeepers participated and both kept a clean sheet; the number in parentheses is awarded to the goalkeeper who was substituted on, whilst a full clean sheet is awarded to the goalkeeper who was on the field at the start of play. Goalkeepers with no clean sheets not included in the list.

As of match played 7 November 2026

Rank	No.	Nat.	Goalkeeper	A-League Men	Australia Cup	AFC Champions League Elite	Total
Total				0	0	0	0

== See also ==
- 2026–27 Newcastle Jets FC (women) season
