= Oliver Cockle =

Australian soccer player

Personal information
- Full name: Oliver Cockle
- Date of birth: 3 February 2008 (age 18)
- Place of birth: Cayman Islands
- Position: Winger

Team information
- Current team: Newcastle Jets
- Number: 37

Youth career
- 2013–2018: Cooks Hill United FC
- 2018–2020: Newcastle Jets
- 2020: Broadmeadow Magic FC
- 2021–2025: Newcastle Jets FC

Senior career*
Years	Team	Apps	(Gls)
2024–	Newcastle Jets NPL	43	(16)
2025–	Newcastle Jets	0	(0)
- * Club domestic league appearances and goals

Oliver Cockle (born 3 February 2008) is an Australian professional soccer player who plays as a winger for Newcastle Jets.

== Club career ==
=== Newcastle Jets ===
Oliver Cockle was first named in the Newcastle Jets squad for an A-League Men's fixture against Wellington Phoenix FC, however he did not come off the bench.

He signed his first professional contract for the Jets ahead of the 2026–27 A-League season. Oliver made his professional debut in the Australia Cup Round of 32, in a 3-2 loss to Preston Lions.

== Club career ==
Cockle was born in the Cayman Islands and moved to Australia at age four.

== Career statistics ==
As of match played 17 July 2026

Appearances and goals by club, season and competition
Club	Season	League			Domestic Cup		Continental		Total	
Club	Season	Division	Apps	Goals	Apps	Goals	Apps	Goals	Apps	Goals
Newcastle Jets FC Youth	2024	NSW League Two	1	0	—		—		1	0
Newcastle Jets FC Youth	2025	NSW League One	25	13	—		—		25	13
Newcastle Jets FC Youth	2026	NSW League One	17	3	—		—		17	3
Newcastle Jets FC Youth	Jets Youth Total		43	16	—		—		43	16
Newcastle Jets	2025–26	A-League Men	0	0	0	0	—		0	0
Newcastle Jets	2026–27	A-League Men	0	0	1	0	0	0	1	0
Newcastle Jets	Newcastle Jets Total		0	0	1	0	0	0	1	0
Career total			43	16	1	0	0	0	44	16

== Honours ==
=== Personal ===
- Newcastle Jets FC Emerging Jet 2024-25
