= Jordan Baylis =

Australian soccer player

Personal information
- Full name: Jordan Baylis
- Date of birth: 17 October 2005 (age 21)
- Place of birth: Newcastle, Australia
- Height: 1.85 m (6 ft 1 in)
- Position: Goalkeeper (association football)

Team information
- Current team: Newcastle Jets
- Number: 40

Youth career
- Cardiff City FC
- South Cardiff FC
- –2019: Edgeworth Eagles FC
- 2020–2023: Newcastle Jets FC

Senior career*
Years	Team	Apps	(Gls)
2022–	Newcastle Jets FC Youth	52	(0)
2025–	Newcastle Jets	0	(0)
- * Club domestic league appearances and goals

Jordan Baylis (born 17 October 2005) is an Australian professional soccer player who plays as a Goalkeeper for the Newcastle Jets.

== Youth Career ==
=== Newcastle Jets FC ===
After excelling at Edgeworth FC, Jordan was selected for the Newcastle Jets FC academy for their 2020 U15s squad. By 2022, Jordan was representing the Newcastle Jets FC Youth team, which is the club's reserve team. He started in their 2-1 Football NSW League Three grand final victory over Nepean FC, helping earn promotion into the Football NSW League Two competition.

Jordan played regularly for the Youth team in 2024, helping them earn promotion to the Football NSW League One. In 2025, Jordan started 21 of the 30 games as the Youth team finished 5th in their debut season in League One.

== Club career ==
=== Newcastle Jets ===
Whilst not debuting for the first team as of yet, Jordan has featured on the bench several times across the A-League and Australia Cup, earning winners medals for both competitions in the 2025-26 season.

== Career statistics ==
As of match played 19 June 2026

Appearances and goals by club, season and competition
Club	Season	League			Domestic Cup		Continental		Total	
Club	Season	Division	Apps	Goals	Apps	Goals	Apps	Goals	Apps	Goals
Newcastle Jets FC Youth	2022	Football NSW League Three	10	0	-	-	-	-	10	0
Newcastle Jets FC Youth	2023	Football NSW League Two	0	0	-	-	-	-	0	0
Newcastle Jets FC Youth	2024	Football NSW League Two	12	0	-	-	-	-	12	0
Newcastle Jets FC Youth	2025	Football NSW League One	21	0	-	-	-	-	21	0
Newcastle Jets FC Youth	2026	Football NSW League One	9	0	-	-	-	-	9	0
Newcastle Jets FC Youth	Jets Youth Total		52	0	0	0	0	0	0	0
Newcastle Jets FC	2024–25	A-League	0	0	0	0	-	-	0	0
Newcastle Jets FC	2025–26	A-League	0	0	0	0	0	0	0	0
Newcastle Jets FC	Jets Total		0	0	0	0	0	0	0	0
Career Total			52	0	0	0	0	0	0	0

== Honours ==
=== Team ===
Newcastle Jets Youth

- NSW League Two Champions: 2024
- NSW League Two Premiers: 2024
- NSW League Three Champions: 2022
- NSW League Three Premiers: 2022

Newcastle Jets

- Australia Cup: 2025
- A-League Premiership: 2025–26
