= Ethan Debono =

Australian soccer player

Personal information
- Full name: Ethan Debono
- Date of birth: 15 December 2005 (age 20)
- Place of birth: Gosford, New South Wales, Australia
- Position: Winger

Team information
- Current team: Newcastle Jets
- Number: 17

Youth career
- Terrigal United FC
- 2018–2024: Central Coast Mariners
- 2024: Bulls FC Academy
- 2025–2026: Newcastle Jets FC

Senior career*
Years	Team	Apps	(Gls)
2024	Central Coast Mariners Academy	3	(1)
2024	Bulls FC Academy	1	(0)
2025–2026	Newcastle Jets Youth	44	(22)
2025–	Newcastle Jets FC	2	(0)
2025	→ NWS Spirit FC (loan)	7	(0)

International career
2023	Malta U19	3	(1)
- * Club domestic league appearances and goals

Etha Debono (born 15 December 2005) is an Australian professional soccer player who plays as a winger for Newcastle Jets.

== Club career ==
=== Newcastle Jets ===
==== 2025–26: Professional Debut and loan spell away ====
Ethan made his professional debut against Adelaide United in the Australia Cup Round of 32, qualifying him for a winners medal when the Newcastle Jets won the 2025 Australia Cup. He then spent a short period of time on loan at NWS Spirit in the 2025 Australian Championship, before returning to the Jets. He featured in one A-League squad during the season, being named on the bench as the Jets beat Sydney FC 2–1 in round 22.

==== 2026-27 ====
Debono made his A-League debut against his boyhood club, the Central Coast Mariners, coming off the bench in a 2–2 draw in matchweek one.

== International career ==
Ethan has represented Malta at under 19 level.

== Career statistics ==
As of match played 3 November 2026

Appearances and goals by club, season and competition
Club	Season	League			Domestic Cup		Continental		Total	
Club	Season	Division	Apps	Goals	Apps	Goals	Apps	Goals	Apps	Goals
Central Coast Mariners Academy	2024	NPL NSW	3	1	N/A		N/A		3	1
Bulls FC Academy	2024	FNSW League One	1	0	N/A		N/A		1	0
Newcastle Jets Youth	2025	FNSW League One	28	12	N/A		N/A		28	12
Newcastle Jets Youth	2026	FNSW League One	16	10	N/A		N/A		16	10
Newcastle Jets Youth	Newcastle Jets Youth Total		44	22	0	0	0	0	44	22
NWS Spirit (loan)	2025	Australian Championship	7	0	N/A		N/A		7	0
Newcastle Jets	2025–26	A-League	0	0	1	0	N/A		1	0
Newcastle Jets	2026–27	A-League	2	0	0	0	2	0	4	0
Newcastle Jets	Newcastle Jets Total		2	0	1	0	2	0	5	0
Career Total			57	22	1	0	2	0	60	23

== Honours ==
=== Team ===
Newcastle Jets

- Australia Cup: 2025
- A-League Premiership: 2025–26
