= Alex Nunes =

Australian soccer player

Personal information
- Full name: Alexandro Nunes
- Date of birth: 22 February 2007 (age 19)
- Place of birth: Darwin, Northern Territory, Australia
- Positions: Winger; attacking midfielder

Team information
- Current team: Newcastle Jets
- Number: 24

Youth career
- Litchfield Football Club
- 2016–2025: Newcastle Jets FC

Senior career*
Years	Team	Apps	(Gls)
2022–	Newcastle Jets FC Youth	65	(14)
2024–	Newcastle Jets FC	8	(0)

International career
2026–	Australia U20	2	(2)
- * Club domestic league appearances and goals

Alexandro Nunes (born 22 February 2007) is an Australian professional soccer player who plays for Newcastle Jets.

== Youth career ==
=== Newcastle Jets FC ===
Originally from Darwin, Nunes joined the Newcastle Jets academy at under-9s level. In 2022, at the age of 15, he spent two weeks on trial with Portuguese powerhouse S.L. Benfica.

Nunes first featured for the Newcastle Jets Youth Team against in the Football NSW League Three competition at just 14 years old. Nunes helped them to promotion that season, as he also appeared in the grand final against Nepean FC. Nunes was the third top scorer for the Jets Youth team that went unbeaten in the 2024 Football NSW League Two competition with 11 goals, behind Xavier Bertoncello (18) and Janni Rafty (13).

== Club career ==
=== Newcastle Jets FC ===
==== 2024-25 - Debut Season ====
Following his form for the Youth Team, Nunes was rewarded with a two-year scholarship deal. He made his professional debut in the Australia Cup for the Newcastle Jets against Western United FC. Nunes featured on the bench in the next round against Rockdale Ilinden, however that was the last time he featured in the squad in 2024–25.

==== 2025-26 - Australia Cup Success ====
Nunes made his second Jets appearance over a year after his first, when he came off of the bench against Adelaide United in the 2025 Australia Cup Round of 32. He also featured in next round against Cooks Hill United, before missing the quarter-final clash with Macarthur FC. He returned to the squad for the semi-final against Avondale, where he scored his first professional goal as the Jets won 4–2. Nunes would assist Ben Gibson in scoring the third goal as the Jets defeated Heidelberg United 3–1 in extra-time to win the Australia Cup.

Nunes made his A-League debut in round one of the 2025–26 A-League competition, as the Jets lost to the Central Coast Mariners 3–2.

== Career statistics ==
As of 26 May 2026

Appearances and goals by club, season and competition
Club	Season	League			Domestic Cup		Continental		Other		Total	
Club	Season	Division	Apps	Goals	Apps	Goals	Apps	Goals	Apps	Goals	Apps	Goals
Newcastle Jets FC Youth	2022	Football NSW League Three	5	0	—		—		—		5	0
Newcastle Jets FC Youth	2023	Football NSW League Two	14	0	—		—		—		14	0
Newcastle Jets FC Youth	2024	Football NSW League Two	22	11	—		—		—		22	11
Newcastle Jets FC Youth	2025	Football NSW League One	19	4	—		—		—		19	4
Newcastle Jets FC Youth	2026	Football NSW League One	5	0							5	0
Newcastle Jets FC Youth	Jets Youth Sub-Total		60	14	—		—		—		65	14
Newcastle Jets FC	2024–25	A-League Men	0	0	1	0	—				1	0
Newcastle Jets FC	2025-26	A-League Men	8	0	4	1	—		—		12	1
Newcastle Jets FC	2026–27	A-League Men	0	0	1	0					1	0
Newcastle Jets FC	Newcastle Jets Sub-Total		8	0	6	1	0	0	0	0	14	1
Career total			73	14	6	1	—		—		79	15

== Honours ==
Newcastle Jets FC Youth

- Football NSW League Three Champions: 2022
- Football NSW League Three Premiers: 2022
- Football NSW League Two Champions: 2024
- Football NSW League Two Premiers: 2024

Newcastle Jets FC

- Australia Cup Champions: 2025
- A-League Premiership: 2025–26
