= Oscar Gonzalez (soccer) =

Australian soccer player (born 2008)

Personal information
- Full name: Oscar Gonzalez
- Date of birth: 12 December 2008 (age 17)
- Position: Forward

Team information
- Current team: Newcastle Jets
- Number: 26

Youth career
- –2023: Sydney Olympic FC
- 2024–2026: APIA Leichhardt FC

Senior career*
Years	Team	Apps	(Gls)
2025–2026	APIA Leichhardt FC	21	(8)
2026–	Newcastle Jets	0	(0)
- * Club domestic league appearances and goals

Oscar Gonzalez (born 12 December 2008) is an Australian professional soccer player who plays as a forward for the Newcastle Jets.

== Youth Career ==
Oscar Gonzalez came through the NPL youth systems at Sydney Olympic and APIA Leichhardt, before being promoted to the APIA first team for the 2025 Australian Championship.

== Club career ==
=== APIA Leichhardt ===
==== 2025 Australian Championship ====
Oscar made his senior debut for APIA against Bayswater City in the Australian Championship, coming off the bench to score APIA's third goal in a 4-1 win. As a result of his goal, Oscar became the youngest goal-scorer in Australian Championship history.

Gonzalez would again score off the bench, this time a dramatic late equaliser against Marconi Stallions in the quarter-finals of the Australian Championship, however APIA would be knocked out via penalties.

==== 2026 NPL NSW ====
Oscar would make his NPL NSW senior debut in round one of the 2026 season, coming off the bench to score a late consolation against Marconi. His first start would come in the Australia Cup round four preliminary qualifier against Banksia Tigers FC, in which he would score a hat-trick.

Oscar's first league start would come in round eleven, against Sydney Olympic, with Gonzalez scoring the fourth as APIA won 4-1. Gonzalez added another two to his season tally against SD Raiders in a 3-2 comeback win, before scoring another the following week against Sydney United 58 to send APIA top of the NPL NSW.

In the final Australia Cup qualifier, Oscar would score the only goal in a 1-0 win over Rockdale Ilinden to secure qualification into the 2026 Australia Cup Round of 32. Gonzalez would score two goals in his final game for APIA, a 4-2 win over SD Raiders to secure a spot in the 2026 Waratah Cup Final.

=== Newcastle Jets FC ===
On the 2nd of July 2026, the Newcastle Jets announced the signing of Oscar Gonzalez on a two-year deal.

== Career statistics ==
As of match played 2 July 2026

Appearances and goals by club, season and competition
Club	Season	League			Domestic Cup		Continental		Total	
Club	Season	Division	Apps	Goals	Apps	Goals	Apps	Goals	Apps	Goals
APIA Leichhardt FC	2025	Australian Championship	2	2	0	0	0	0	2	2
APIA Leichhardt FC	2026	NPL NSW	19	6	3	6	0	0	22	12
APIA Leichhardt Total			21	8	3	6	0	0	24	14
Newcastle Jets FC	2026–27	A-League	0	0	0	0	0	0	0	0
Career Total			21	8	3	6	0	0	24	14
