= Angus Reid (soccer) =

Australian soccer player

Personal information
- Full name: Angus Reid
- Date of birth: 18 March 2007 (age 19)
- Place of birth: Newcastle, Australia
- Position: Defender

Team information
- Current team: Newcastle Jets
- Number: 34

Youth career
- Valentine FC
- 2021–2025: Central Coast Mariners

Senior career*
Years	Team	Apps	(Gls)
2024–2025	Central Coast Mariners Academy	16	(0)
2025–	Newcastle Jets Youth	28	(1)
2026–	Newcastle Jets	0	(0)
- * Club domestic league appearances and goals

Angus Reid (born 18 March 2007) is an Australian professional soccer player who plays as a Centre-back for the Newcastle Jets.

== Club career ==
=== Newcastle Jets ===
==== 2026–27: Debut season ====
Angus made his professional against Kashima Antlers in the 2026–27 AFC Champions League Elite, starting and playing the full game in a 7–1 loss.

== Career statistics ==
As of match played 17 November 2026

Appearances and goals by club, season and competition
Club	Season	League			Domestic Cup		Continental		Total	
Club	Season	Division	Apps	Goals	Apps	Goals	Apps	Goals	Apps	Goals
Central Coast Mariners Academy	2024	NPL NSW	0	0	N/A		N/A		0	0
Central Coast Mariners Academy	2025	NPL NSW	16	0	N/A		N/A		16	0
Central Coast Mariners Academy	Mariners Academy Total		16	0	0	0	0	0	16	0
Newcastle Jets Youth	2026	Football NSW League One	28	1	N/A		N/A		28	1
Newcastle Jets	2026–27	A-League Men	0	0	0	0	1	0	1	0
Career Total			44	1	0	0	1	0	45	1
