= 2024 Football NSW season =

Football New South Wales
- Season: 2024

The 2024 Football NSW season is the 12th season of soccer in New South Wales under the banner of the National Premier Leagues. The season was the second under the revamped format which consisted of three senior divisions in the state of New South Wales. The official schedule was released on 12 December 2023.

== Competitions ==
=== 2024 National Premier Leagues NSW ===
NPL NSW Men's
- Season: 2024
- Dates: 16 February – 25 August
- Champions: Marconi Stallions
- Premiers: Rockdale Ilinden
- Relegated: Hills United
- Matches: 231
- Goals: 778 (3.37 per match)
- Top goalscorer: Alec Urosevski (Rockdale Ilinden) 31

==== Stadiums and locations ====
Team	Head coach	Location	Stadium	Capacity
APIA Leichhardt	(Australia) Franco Parisi	Leichhardt	Lambert Park	7,000
APIA Leichhardt	(Australia) Franco Parisi	Leichhardt	Leichhardt Oval	20,000
Blacktown City	(Australia) Mark Crittenden	Blacktown	Blacktown City Sports Centre	7,500
Central Coast Mariners Academy	(Brazil) Lucas Vilela	Gosford	Pluim Park	2,000
Hills United	(Australia) Luke Casserly	Hills District	Blacktown City Sports Centre	7,500
Marconi Stallions	(Australia) Peter Tsekenis	Fairfield	Marconi Stadium	9,000
Manly United	(Netherlands) Patrick Zwaanswijk	Dee Why	Cromer Park	5,000
NWS Spirit	(Australia) David Perkovic	North Sydney	Christie Park	1,000
Rockdale Ilinden	(Australia) Paul Dee	Rockdale	Rockdale Ilinden Sports Centre	5,000
St George	(Australia) Steve Karavatakis	St George	Rockdale Ilinden Sports Centre	5,000
St George City	(Australia) Mirko Jurilj	St George	Penshurst Park	1,000
Sutherland Sharks	(Australia) Steven Zoric	Sutherland	Seymour Shaw Park	5,000
Sydney FC Youth	(Australia) Jimmy Van Weeren	Moore Park	Valentine Sports Park	4,000
Sydney Olympic	(Australia) Labinot Haliti	Belmore	Belmore Sports Ground	20,000
Sydney United	(Australia) Zeljko Kalac	Edensor Park	Sydney United Sports Centre	12,000
Western Sydney Wanderers Youth	(Australia) Andrew Christiansen	Blacktown	Wanderers Football Park	4,500
Wollongong Wolves	(Australia) David Carney	Wollongong	WIN Stadium	22,000

==== Table ====
Pos	Team	Pld	W	D	L	GF	GA	GD	Pts	Qualification or relegation
1	Rockdale Ilinden	30	23	3	4	76	40	+36	72	Qualification for the Finals series
2	Marconi Stallions (C)	30	21	2	7	70	35	+35	65	Qualification for the Finals series
3	APIA Leichhardt	30	18	3	9	78	48	+30	57	Qualification for the Finals series
4	Blacktown City	30	17	6	7	66	37	+29	57	Qualification for the Finals series
5	St George City	30	16	3	11	46	40	+6	51	Qualification for the Finals series
6	Sydney United	30	15	5	10	45	40	+5	50	Qualification for the Finals series
7	Wollongong Wolves	30	13	5	12	55	41	+14	44	
8	Sydney Olympic	30	13	3	14	51	42	+9	42	
9	Manly United	30	10	5	15	33	50	−17	35	
10	NWS Spirit	30	10	4	16	39	53	−14	34	
11	Western Sydney Wanderers Youth	30	12	2	16	62	68	−6	32 (Note: Western Sydney Wanderers were deducted six points for breaches of the grievance and disciplinary regulations. In addition, they were fined $33,500 and given 'restricted access' for away supporters.)	
12	St George FC	30	8	8	14	37	58	−21	32	
13	Sutherland Sharks	30	7	8	15	32	49	−17	29	
14	Sydney FC Youth	30	8	5	17	39	67	−28	29	
15	Central Coast Mariners Academy (O)	30	8	4	18	42	67	−25	28	Qualification for the Relegation play-off
16	Hills United (R)	30	8	0	22	35	71	−36	24	Relegation to 2025 NSW League One

Source: Football NSW
Rules for classification: 1) Points; 2) Goal difference; 3) Goals scored; 4) Head-to-head points; 5) Head-to-head goals scored; 6) Play-off match
(C) Champions; (O) Play-off winners; (R) Relegated

==== Results ====
Home \ Away	API	BCT	CCM	HIL	MAN	MAR	NWS	ROC	SGC	STG	SUT	SFC	SOL	SUN	WSW	WOL
APIA Leichhardt	—	3–1	3–1	4–1	4–0	1–4	1–0	3–2	4–1	5–0	3–2	1–5	2–0	1–5	5–3	1–1
Blacktown City	6–3	—	3–1	4–0	2–0	3–0	3–1	1–2	3–0	1–2	3–2	8–0	1–0	2–2	3–0	0–1
CCM Academy	3–2	1–1	—	5–3	2–2	0–1	3–0	1–2	0–3	3–3	3–2	1–1	0–2	1–2	2–5	3–2
Hills United	1–2	0–2	2–0	—	2–1	1–3	4–1	0–3	2–0	2–3	2–3	4–2	2–1	2–3	1–2	0–2
Manly United	1–0	1–1	2–0	0–2	—	0–1	3–2	1–1	1–2	3–0	1–1	1–0	0–2	1–1	0–5	2–1
Marconi Stallions	1–2	6–2	2–0	4–0	2–1	—	2–1	9–0	2–1	4–0	3–3	3–0	0–4	2–1	3–1	2–1
NWS Spirit	0–2	4–2	1–2	3–1	4–2	1–0	—	1–2	1–2	1–3	1–3	0–0	1–2	1–1	1–0	1–0
Rockdale Ilinden	2–1	2–3	4–1	5–0	4–0	2–2	3–1	—	2–0	4–0	4–0	3–1	3–2	1–1	3–2	3–1
St George City	1–0	0–2	2–0	3–1	3–1	2–1	3–4	1–2	—	1–1	1–1	1–2	1–0	2–1	5–0	0–2
St George FC	2–2	0–0	2–0	2–0	1–1	0–1	0–2	1–4	0–2	—	3–1	2–1	2–1	2–3	2–2	2–2
Sutherland Sharks	0–7	2–0	0–1	2–1	1–2	1–2	0–0	0–3	0–1	3–1	—	0–0	1–0	0–1	0–0	0–4
Sydney FC Youth	1–7	1–2	4–1	3–1	2–0	0–4	1–3	1–2	1–3	2–1	0–0	—	1–3	0–2	2–5	1–5
Sydney Olympic	1–1	3–3	1–2	1–2	2–1	1–2	2–1	2–1	0–1	0–3	1–1	1–2	—	6–0	4–1	4–3
Sydney United	2–0	0–2	1–0	3–0	0–2	3–2	3–0	1–2	1–0	0–0	1–0	0–0	0–1	—	3–2	1–2
WSW Youth	0–6	3–0	3–5	2–0	0–1	2–5	4–1	2–3	6–1	4–2	3–1	0–3	3–2	0–2	—	0–2
Wollongong Wolves	1–2	2–2	5–1	4–0	1–2	1–2	0–0	1–2	1–1	1–0	2–1	3–2	1–2	3–2	0–2	—

Updated to match(es) played on 25 August 2024. Source: footballnsw.com.au
Legend: Blue = home team win; Yellow = draw; Red = away team win.
For upcoming matches, an "a" indicates there is an article about the rivalry between the two participants.

==== Finals series ====
Elimination semi-finals
3	APIA Leichhardt	1
6	Sydney United	2
4	Blacktown City	4
5	St George City	2

Preliminary finals
1	Rockdale Ilinden	3
6	Sydney United	1
2	Marconi Stallions	6
4	Blacktown City	2

Grand final
1	Rockdale Ilinden	0
2	Marconi Stallions	3

==== Relegation play-off ====
Team 1	Agg.	Team 2	1st leg	2nd leg
Central Coast Mariners Academy	5–2	Bulls FC Academy	1–2	4–0

=== 2024 National Premier Leagues NSW Women's ===
National Premier Leagues NSW Women's
- Season: 2024
- Champions: Macarthur Rams
- Premiers: Macarthur Rams

The 2024 National Premier Leagues NSW Women's was the 11th edition of the NPL NSW Women's competition to be incorporated under the National Premier Leagues banner. 14 teams competed, playing each other twice for a total of 26 rounds. The top four teams played-off in a finals series.

==== League Table ====
Pos	Team	Pld	W	D	L	GF	GA	GD	Pts	
1	Macarthur Rams (C)	26	17	5	4	63	23	+40	56	2024 NPL NSW Women's Finals
2	APIA Leichhardt	26	15	6	5	55	37	+18	51	2024 NPL NSW Women's Finals
3	Illawarra Stingrays	26	14	5	7	53	34	+19	47	2024 NPL NSW Women's Finals
4	Sydney Olympic	26	14	4	8	48	40	+8	46	2024 NPL NSW Women's Finals
5	Northern Tigers	26	13	5	8	65	49	+16	44	
6	NWS Spirit	26	11	8	7	46	36	+10	41	
7	Gladesville Ravens	26	12	4	10	51	37	+14	40	
8	Bulls FC Academy	26	12	4	10	60	49	+11	40	
9	Manly United	26	11	5	10	45	42	+3	38	
10	Sydney University	26	7	7	12	41	51	−10	28	
11	UNSW	26	6	7	13	38	45	−7	25	
12	Football NSW Institute	26	7	1	18	38	66	−28	22	
13	Emerging Jets	26	5	5	16	38	94	−56	20	
14	Blacktown Spartans	26	4	2	20	32	70	−38	14	

Source: Ladder
Rules for classification: 1) points; 2) goal difference; 3) number of goals scored.
(C) Champions

==== Finals ====
Semi-final
1	Macarthur Rams	2
4	Sydney Olympic	0
2	APIA Leichhardt	1
3	Illawarra Stingrays	0

Grand final
Macarthur Rams (p)	2 (4)
APIA Leichhardt	2 (2)
