= Peter Tsekenis =

Australian soccer player

Personal information
- Full name: Peter Nectario Tsekenis
- Date of birth: 4 August 1973 (age 53)
- Place of birth: Sydney, New South Wales, Australia
- Height: 1.83 m (6 ft 0 in)
- Position: Defender

Senior career*
Years	Team	Apps	(Gls)
1990–1991	St George	3	(0)
1991–2000	Sydney Olympic	173	(6)
2000–2004	Newcastle United	81	(5)
2004	Belmore Hercules	8	(0)
2004–2008	Bankstown City Lions		

International career
1996	Australia U23	2	(1)

Managerial career
- 2004–2010: Bankstown City Lions
- 2011–2013: Sydney Olympic
- 2018–2026: Marconi Stallions
- * Club domestic league appearances and goals

Peter Nectario Tsekenis (born 4 August 1973) is an Australian former professional soccer player who played as a defender and the former coach of Marconi Stallions, Sydney Olympic and Bankstown City Lions.

== Career ==
Born in Sydney, Tsekenis played at club level for St George, Sydney Olympic, Newcastle United and Belmore Hercules, before becoming player-manager of Bankstown City Lions.

He also participated at the 1996 Summer Olympics.

In 2011, Tsekenis returned to Sydney Olympic Football Club as coach of their first grade side. By April 2019 he was coaching Marconi Stallions. He left the club in August 2026.

== Personal life ==
He is of Greek descent.
