= Nikos Vergos =

Greek footballer (born 1996)

Personal information
- Full name: Nikolaos Vergos
- Date of birth: 13 January 1996 (age 30)
- Place of birth: Kilkis, Greece
- Height: 1.84 m (6 ft 1/2 in)
- Position: Striker

Team information
- Current team: Newcastle Jets
- Number: 9

Youth career
- 2002–2004: Alexandros Kilkis
- 2004–2006: Doxa Chersou
- 2006–2009: Alexandros Kilkis
- 2009–2014: Olympiacos

Senior career*
| Years | Team | Apps | (Gls) |
| 2014–2018 | Olympiacos | 5 | (1) |
| 2015–2016 | → Elche (loan) | 13 | (2) |
| 2016–2017 | → Real Madrid B (loan) | 25 | (5) |
| 2017–2018 | → Vasas (loan) | 4 | (0) |
| 2018–2020 | Panathinaikos | 4 | (0) |
| 2020 | → Hércules (loan) | 8 | (1) |
| 2020–2022 | Panetolikos | 67 | (15) |
| 2022–2023 | Wolfsberger AC | 11 | (1) |
| 2023 | → Lamia (loan) | 16 | (4) |
| 2023–2024 | Atromitos | 31 | (5) |
| 2024–2026 | Melbourne Victory | 55 | (14) |
| 2026– | Newcastle Jets | 4 | (1) |

International career^{‡}
| 2011–2013 | Greece U17 | 3 | (3) |
| 2013–2014 | Greece U18 | 5 | (0) |
| 2013–2015 | Greece U19 | 17 | (2) |
| 2015–2018 | Greece U21 | 13 | (4) |
- * Club domestic league appearances and goals as of 10 May 2026 ‡ National team caps and goals as of 5 May 2019

Nikos Vergos (Greek: Νίκος Βέργος, pronounced [ˈnikos ˈverɣos]; born 13 January 1996) is a Greek professional footballer. He plays as a striker for A-League Men club Newcastle Jets.

== Domestic career ==
=== Greece ===
Vergos is a product of the youth system of Olympiacos and made his debut on 25 September 2013, as a substitute in a Greek Football Cup match against Fokikos.

On 19 March 2014, he was substituted on to replace David Fuster in a Champions League match against Manchester United in the Round of 16.

Vergos made his Super League Greece debut on 23 March 2014 as a substitute in an away game against Ergotelis. Three days later, on 26 March, in an away game against Asteras Tripolis, he made his second appearance as a substitute, where he scored his first goal with a header.

=== Europe ===
On 20 August 2015, he signed for Segunda División club Elche on a one-year loan from Olympiacos.

On 24 August 2016, he was loaned out for a year to Spanish club Real Madrid Castilla from Super League Greece club Olympiacos. On 4 September 2016, he made his debut with the club as a substitute in a 3–2 home win against SD Amorebieta. On 15 October 2016, he scored his first goal with the club, in his second appearance against UD Socuéllamos. On 5 March 2017, he scored a brace leading the team to a 3–1 away win against UD Socuéllamos. On 13 March 2017, he was the only scorer in a 1–0 home win against Zamudio SD, which gave Castilla their second consecutive win.

On 28 August 2017, Vergos was loaned out for a season to Hungarian club Vasas from Super League Greece club Olympiacos. On 9 January 2018 he returned to Olympiacos.

After returning to Olympiacos in January from an unsuccessful loan spell at Vasas, Vergos failed to make an impression on new head coach Pedro Martins, which resulted in him being released. On 21 August 2018, Panathinaikos signed Vergos on a three-year deal as a free agent from Olympiacos, which kept a resale rate of 20%. On 13 January 2020, he was loaned out to Segunda División B club Hércules CF from Panathinaikos. On 4 August 2020, Panetolikos signed Vergos in a two-year deal as a free agent from Panathinaikos. On 30 May 2021, the 25-year-old striker scored a penalty against Xanthi in a relegation play-off game, in which Panetolikos secured their place in Greece's top flight.

On 1 July 2023, Vergos joined Atromitos on a two-year deal, which only lasted one season.

=== Australia ===
Vergos joined Melbourne Victory on 8 August 2024. On 29 December 2025, Vergos scored his first professional hat-trick in a 5–1 win over Wellington Phoenix.

== Career statistics ==
As of match played 3 November 2026

Appearances and goals by club, season and competition
| Club | Season | League | | | Domestic Cup | | Continental | | Total | |
| Club | Season | Division | Apps | Goals | Apps | Goals | Apps | Goals | Apps | Goals |
|---|---|---|---|---|---|---|---|---|---|---|
| Olympiacos | 2013–14 | Super League Greece | 3 | 1 | 1 | 0 | 1 | 0 | 5 | 1 |
| Olympiacos | 2014–15 | Super League Greece | 0 | 0 | 3 | 0 | 0 | 0 | 3 | 0 |
| Olympiacos | 2015–16 | Super League Greece | 0 | 0 | 0 | 0 | 0 | 0 | 0 | 0 |
| Olympiacos | 2016–17 | Super League Greece | 0 | 0 | 0 | 0 | 0 | 0 | 0 | 0 |
| Olympiacos | 2017–18 | Super League Greece | 2 | 0 | 0 | 0 | 0 | 0 | 0 | 0 |
| Olympiacos | Olympiacos Total | | 5 | 1 | 4 | 0 | 1 | 0 | 10 | 1 |
| Elche (loan) | 2015–16 | Segunda División | 12 | 2 | 1 | 0 | N/A | | 12 | 2 |
| Real Madrid Castilla (loan) | 2016–17 | Segunda División B | 25 | 5 | N/A | | N/A | | 25 | 5 |
| Vasas SC (loan) | 2017–18 | Nemzeti Bajnokság I | 4 | 0 | 2 | 1 | N/A | | 6 | 1 |
| Panathinaikos | 2018–19 | Super League Greece | 4 | 0 | 4 | 1 | N/A | | 8 | 1 |
| Hércules CF | 2019–20 | Segunda División B | 8 | 1 | 0 | 0 | N/A | | 8 | 1 |
| Panetolikos | 2020–21 | Super League Greece | 31 | 7 | 1 | 0 | N/A | | 32 | 7 |
| Panetolikos | 2021–22 | Super League Greece | 31 | 6 | 4 | 2 | N/A | | 35 | 8 |
| Panetolikos | Panetolikos Total | | 62 | 13 | 5 | 2 | 0 | 0 | 67 | 15 |
| Wolfsberger AC | 2022–23 | Austrian Bundesliga | 11 | 1 | 2 | 0 | 3 | 0 | 16 | 1 |
| PAS Lamia | 2022–23 | Super League Greece | 16 | 4 | 2 | 0 | N/A | | 18 | 4 |
| Atromitos | 2023–24 | Super League Greece | 31 | 5 | 4 | 1 | N/A | | 35 | 6 |
| Melbourne Victory | 2024–25 | A-League Men | 30 | 7 | 4 | 3 | N/A | | 34 | 10 |
| Melbourne Victory | 2025–26 | A-League Men | 24 | 7 | 1 | 0 | N/A | | 25 | 7 |
| Melbourne Victory | Melbourne Victory Total | | 54 | 14 | 5 | 3 | 0 | 0 | 59 | 17 |
| Newcastle Jets | 2026–27 | A-League Men | 4 | 1 | 1 | 1 | 4 | 1 | 9 | 3 |
| Career Total | | | 236 | 47 | 30 | 9 | 7 | 1 | 273 | 57 |

== Honours ==
Olympiacos

- Super League: 2013–14, 2014–15
- Greek Cup: 2015
