= 2025 Football NSW season =

Football New South Wales
- Season: 2025

The 2025 Football NSW season was the 13th season of soccer in New South Wales under the banner of the National Premier Leagues. The season was the third under the revamped format which consisted of three senior divisions in the state of New South Wales. The official schedule was released on 19 December 2023.

== Competitions ==
=== 2025 National Premier Leagues NSW ===
NPL NSW Men's
- Season: 2025
- Dates: 7 February – 31 August
- Champions: APIA Leichhardt
- Premiers: NWS Spirit
- Matches: 118
- Goals: 374 (3.17 per match)
- Top goalscorer: Alec Urosevski – 17 goals (Rockdale Ilinden)
- Biggest home win: Rockdale Ilinden 8–1 Western Sydney Wanderers Youth (19 April 2025)
- Biggest away win: Blacktown City 0–5 Sydney FC Youth (11 May)
- Highest scoring: Rockdale Ilinden 8–1 Western Sydney Wanderers Youth (19 April)
- Longest winning run: 8 – Marconi (16 March – 2 May)
- Longest unbeaten run: 13 – Marconi (8 February – 2 May)
- Longest winless run: 9 – CCM Youth (15 March – )
- Longest losing run: 7 – CCM Youth (23 March – 11 May)

==== Stadiums and locations ====
Team	Head coach	Location	Stadium	Capacity
APIA Leichhardt	(Australia) Franco Parisi	Leichhardt	Lambert Park	7,000
APIA Leichhardt	(Australia) Franco Parisi	Leichhardt	Leichhardt Oval	20,000
Blacktown City	(Australia) Mark Crittenden	Blacktown	Landen Stadium	7,500
Central Coast Mariners Academy	(Brazil) Lucas Vilela	Gosford	Pluim Park	2,000
Manly United	(Australia) Jimmy Snedden (interim)	Dee Why	Cromer Park	5,000
Marconi Stallions	(Australia) Peter Tsekenis	Fairfield	Marconi Stadium	9,000
Mount Druitt Town Rangers	(Australia) Andrew Montgomery	Mount Druitt	Popondetta Park	4,000
NWS Spirit	(Australia) David Perkovic	Macquarie Park	Christie Park	1,000
Rockdale Ilinden	(Australia) Paul Dee	Rockdale	Rockdale Ilinden Sports Centre	5,000
St George FC	(Australia) Fabian Miceli	St George	Barton Park	1,500
St George City	(Australia) Manny Spanoudakis	St George	Penshurst Park	1,000
Sutherland Sharks FC	(Australia) Steven Zoric	Sutherland	Seymour Shaw Park	5,000
Sydney FC Youth	(Australia) Jimmy Van Weeren	Moore Park	Rockdale Ilinden Sports Centre	5,000
Sydney Olympic	(Australia) Labinot Haliti	Belmore; Carlton	Belmore Sports Ground	20,000
Sydney Olympic	(Australia) Labinot Haliti	Belmore; Carlton	Jubilee Stadium	20,500
Sydney United	(Australia) Ante Juric	Edensor Park	Sydney United Sports Centre	12,000
Western Sydney Wanderers Youth	(Australia) Richie Cardozo	Blacktown	Wanderers Football Park	4,500
Wollongong Wolves	(Australia) Julio Miranda (interim)	Wollongong	WIN Stadium	22,000
Wollongong Wolves	(Australia) Julio Miranda (interim)	Wollongong	Macedonia Park	10,000

Note: Sutherland Sharks FC announced that the club would re-brand as 'Sharks FC' on 31 January, and played round 1 under the new name, before reverting to Sutherland Sharks FC a week later following widespread negative feedback for the new name.

==== Table ====
Pos	Team	Pld	W	D	L	GF	GA	GD	Pts	Qualification or relegation
1	NWS Spirit (Q)	30	20	6	4	67	30	+37	66	Qualification to Australian Championship and Finals series
2	APIA Leichhardt (Note: Team pre-qualified to the Australian Championship as a Foundation club.) (C)	30	20	4	6	75	35	+40	64	Qualification to Finals series
3	Marconi Stallions	30	19	5	6	48	29	+19	62	Qualification to Finals series
4	Rockdale Ilinden	30	15	10	5	68	41	+27	55	Qualification to Finals series
5	Blacktown City	30	15	5	10	50	50	0	50	Qualification to Finals series
6	Sydney United 58	30	14	7	9	41	39	+2	49	Qualification to Finals series
7	Sydney Olympic	30	12	7	11	50	38	+12	40 (Note: Western Sydney Wanderers Youth team and Sydney Olympic were deducted three points for breaches of administrative procedures.)	
8	Wollongong Wolves	30	10	10	10	42	38	+4	40	
9	St George City	30	10	7	13	37	42	−5	37	
10	Sydney FC Youth	30	9	7	14	43	46	−3	34	
11	Manly United	30	9	7	14	40	46	−6	34	
12	St George FC	30	8	8	14	44	55	−11	32	
13	Sutherland Sharks	30	7	5	18	28	53	−25	26	
14	Western Sydney Wanderers Youth	30	7	7	16	29	51	−22	25	
15	Central Coast Mariners Academy (R)	30	5	8	17	29	62	−33	23	Qualification for the Relegation play-off
16	Mount Druitt Town Rangers (R)	30	5	7	18	24	60	−36	22	Relegation to 2026 NSW League One

Source: Dribl
Rules for classification: 1) points; 2) goal difference; 3) number of goals scored; 4) head-to-head points; 5) head-to-head goals scored; 6) play-off.
(C) Champions; (Q) Qualified for the phase indicated; (R) Relegated

==== Results ====
Home \ Away	API	BCT	CCM	MAN	MAR	MTD	NWS	ROC	SGC	STG	SUT	SFC	SOL	SUN	WSW	WOL
APIA Leichhardt	—	1–0	5–0	1–0	0–2	5–0	0–3	3–4	1–0	3–3	5–0	2–0	2–0	2–2	6–1	3–3
Blacktown City	4–3	—	1–0	1–1	0–2	2–2	0–4	1–3	3–1	3–2	1–0	0–5	2–2	3–2	1–0	1–0
CCM Academy	2–6	1–4	—	1–1	1–0	2–0	1–3	1–1	0–0	4–2	0–0	0–3	1–1	3–1	0–3	0–2
Manly United	1–2	3–2	5–0	—	0–3	5–0	0–1	1–1	0–2	0–0	0–3	0–6	1–5	0–0	3–2	6–0
Marconi Stallions	3–2	1–1	3–0	4–2	—	2–1	0–5	0–1	3–1	1–1	3–0	1–0	1–1	2–0	1–0	0–3
Mount Druitt Town Rangers	0–2	2–3	1–1	1–0	0–2	—	1–1	2–3	0–1	0–2	0–0	0–0	0–4	0–2	1–2	3–1
NWS Spirit	1–0	4–1	3–1	2–1	1–2	5–0	—	6–3	2–0	2–2	1–1	3–2	2–1	1–1	1–0	1–0
Rockdale Ilinden	1–4	3–0	3–1	0–0	1–2	4–0	1–1	—	2–2	3–1	1–2	2–1	4–0	0–0	8–1	1–1
St George City	0–0	0–2	3–2	1–2	2–1	1–1	3–2	1–4	—	1–2	1–0	5–0	1–1	0–2	1–0	1–1
St George	2–3	3–2	2–0	1–2	2–2	2–3	0–3	1–2	1–3	—	3–0	1–0	2–0	2–4	0–3	2–1
Sutherland Sharks	0–2	1–2	1–0	0–1	0–2	2–0	1–3	2–3	0–3	1–1	—	4–0	1–5	1–2	3–1	1–3
Sydney FC Youth	2–6	3–3	1–0	0–0	0–1	0–2	2–0	2–2	3–1	1–1	2–0	—	0–2	3–1	1–2	2–2
Sydney Olympic	0–1	0–2	3–0	2–5	2–0	1–2	3–0	2–2	2–1	2–1	2–1	1–2	—	4–0	0–1	0–0
Sydney United	2–1	1–0	0–3	1–0	1–2	2–0	0–2	1–3	1–0	1–1	2–2	3–2	2–1	—	2–0	0–0
WSW Youth	0–1	0–4	2–2	2–0	0–1	1–1	2–3	0–0	1–1	3–0	0–1	0–0	1–1	0–3	—	1–1
Wollongong Wolves	0–2	0–1	2–2	2–0	1–1	2–1	1–1	1–3	3–0	2–1	4–0	1–0	0–2	1–2	4–0	—

Source: Football NSW
Legend: Blue = home team win; Yellow = draw; Red = away team win.
For upcoming matches, an "a" indicates there is an article about the rivalry between the two participants.

==== Finals series ====
Elimination semi-finals
3	Marconi Stallions (p)	1 (3)
6	Sydney United	1 (2)
4	Rockdale Ilinden	1
5	Blacktown City	0

Preliminary finals
2	APIA Leichhardt	2
3	Marconi Stallions	0
1	NWS Spirit	1
4	Rockdale Ilinden (a.e.t.)	2

Grand final
2	APIA Leichhardt	2
4	Rockdale Ilinden	1

=== 2025 National Premier Leagues NSW Women's ===
National Premier Leagues NSW Women's
- Season: 2025
- Champions: Bulls FC Academy
- Premiers: Bulls FC Academy

The 2025 National Premier Leagues NSW Women's was the 12th edition of the NPL NSW Women's competition to be incorporated under the National Premier Leagues banner. 14 teams competed, playing each other twice for a total of 26 rounds. The top four teams played-off in a finals series.

==== League Table ====
Pos	Team	Pld	W	D	L	GF	GA	GD	Pts	
1	Bulls FC Academy (C)	26	16	4	6	57	31	+26	52	2025 NPL NSW Women's Finals
2	APIA Leichhardt	26	15	4	7	52	32	+20	49	2025 NPL NSW Women's Finals
3	UNSW	26	15	4	7	52	40	+12	49	2025 NPL NSW Women's Finals
4	Mount Druitt Town Rangers	26	14	6	6	49	28	+21	48	2025 NPL NSW Women's Finals
5	Manly United	26	13	6	7	45	28	+17	45	
6	Illawarra Stingrays	26	12	9	5	38	33	+5	45	
7	NWS Spirit	26	12	5	9	44	36	+8	41	
8	Gladesville Ravens	26	9	7	10	46	40	+6	34	
9	Northern Tigers	26	9	6	11	49	43	+6	33	
10	Sydney University	26	9	3	14	36	42	−6	30	
11	Macarthur Rams	26	9	0	17	41	66	−25	27	
12	Sydney Olympic	26	7	5	14	41	54	−13	26	
13	Western Sydney Wanderers	26	6	5	15	39	58	−19	23	
14	Newcastle Jets	26	4	0	22	28	86	−58	12	

Source: Ladder
Rules for classification: 1) points; 2) goal difference; 3) number of goals scored.
(C) Champions

==== Finals ====
Semi-final
1	Bulls FC Academy	3
4	Mount Druitt Town Rangers	1
2	APIA Leichhardt	2
3	UNSW	0

Grand final
Bulls FC Academy	4 (a.e.t.)
APIA Leichhardt	3
