= David Perkovic =

Australian football coach

David Perkovic is an Australian association football coach. He has coached senior clubs in Australia and the Philippines, including Kaya FC, NWS Spirit FC and Sutherland Sharks FC. He has also contributed to coach education through Football NSW.

== Education ==
Perkovic holds the Football Federation Australia/AFC Professional Diploma, the highest coaching qualification issued by Football Australia in partnership with the Asian Football Confederation.

== Coaching career ==
Perkovic began coaching in New South Wales, working in youth development and senior football before moving to the Philippines. He was appointed head coach of Kaya FC in the United Football League, where the club competed for domestic honours during the 2014–15 season. He departed the club following the expiration of his contract at the conclusion of the season.

In September 2016, Spirit FC appointed Perkovic as head coach of its men's first-grade team ahead of the 2017 National Premier Leagues NSW season. During his tenure, the club established itself as a finals contender and promoted academy players into senior football. Following the club's rebranding, he continued in the role with NWS Spirit FC.

In May 2021, Perkovic coached his 100th competitive match as head coach of NWS Spirit FC. In 2022, he guided the club to victory in the Waratah Cup, becoming the first second-tier club to win the competition, while also securing promotion to the National Premier Leagues NSW.

Perkovic signed a five-year contract extension with NWS Spirit FC in 2023. During the same year, he was selected as a presenter at the Football NSW Coaching Conference, where he delivered sessions on coaching methodology and player development.

In 2025, Perkovic led NWS Spirit FC to the National Premier Leagues NSW Premiership, the club's first premiership since its promotion to the competition three seasons earlier. At the conclusion of the season, he announced his departure after nine seasons as head coach.

Later in 2025, Sutherland Sharks FC announced Perkovic's appointment as head coach ahead of the 2026 National Premier Leagues NSW season.
