= 2026–27 A-League Men =

50th season of top-tier soccer league in Australia

A-League Men
- Season: 2026–27
- Dates: 16 October 2026 – 5/6 June 2027
- Matches: 28
- Goals: 74 (2.64 per match)
- Top goalscorer: Al Hassan Toure (4 goals)
- Biggest home win: Perth Glory 4–0 Adelaide United (1 November 2026)
- Biggest away win: Newcastle Jets 0–3 Wellington Phoenix (31 October 2026)
- Highest scoring: Western Sydney Wanderers 5–2 Auckland FC (24 October 2026)
- Longest winning run: 3 matches Wellington Phoenix
- Longest unbeaten run: 4 matches Brisbane Roar; Melbourne Victory; Wellington Phoenix
- Longest winless run: 5 matches Central Coast Mariners; Melbourne Victory
- Longest losing run: 2 matches Adelaide United; Newcastle Jets; Perth Glory
- Highest attendance: 30,103; Sydney FC 0–0 Western Sydney Wanderers (16 October 2026)
- Lowest attendance: 3,441; Macarthur FC 2–1 Perth Glory (17 October 2026)
- Total attendance: 254,017
- Average attendance: 9,408
- All statistics correct as of 22 November 2026.

The 2026–27 A-League Men is the 50th season of national level men's soccer in Australia, and the 22nd since the establishment of the competition as the A-League in 2004. Newcastle Jets are the defending premiers while Auckland FC are defending champions.

== Clubs ==
=== Stadiums and locations ===
Twelve clubs are participating in the 2026–27 season.

Note: Table lists in alphabetical order.

Club	City	Home ground	Capacity
Adelaide United	Adelaide	Coopers Stadium	16,500
Auckland FC	Auckland	Go Media Stadium	27,700
Brisbane Roar	Brisbane	Suncorp Stadium	52,500
Brisbane Roar	Brisbane	Kayo Stadium	10,000
Central Coast Mariners	Gosford	Polytec Stadium	20,059
Macarthur FC	Sydney	Campbelltown Sports Stadium	17,500
Melbourne City	Melbourne	AAMI Park	30,050
Melbourne Victory	Melbourne	AAMI Park	30,050
Newcastle Jets	Newcastle	McDonald Jones Stadium	30,000
Perth Glory	Perth	HBF Park	20,500
Sydney FC	Sydney	Allianz Stadium	42,500
Wellington Phoenix	Wellington	Hnry Stadium	34,500
Wellington Phoenix	Christchurch	One New Zealand Stadium	25,000
Western Sydney Wanderers	Sydney	CommBank Stadium	30,000

=== Personnel and kits ===
Team	Manager	Captain	Kit manufacturer	Kit sponsor
Adelaide United	(Brazil) Airton Andrioli	(Australia) Craig Goodwin	UCAN	Mega Rewards
Auckland FC	(Portugal) Pedro Moreira	(Japan) Hiroki Sakai	New Balance	ANZ
Brisbane Roar	(Australia) Michael Valkanis	(Scotland) Tom Aldred	Kelme	Focus Construct
Central Coast Mariners	(Malta) John Hutchinson	(Australia) Trent Sainsbury	KonQa	polytec
Macarthur FC	(Australia) Sasa Ognenovski	(Australia) Liam Rose	Kelme	Pennytel
Melbourne City	(Australia) Aurelio Vidmar	(Australia) Aziz Behich	Puma	Etihad Airways
Melbourne Victory	(Venezuela) Giovanni Savarese	(Australia) Jason Davidson	Elite Eleven	Turkish Airlines
Newcastle Jets	(Australia) Mark Milligan	(Australia) Max Burgess	New Balance	Oz Shipping Containers
Perth Glory	(Australia) Adam Griffiths	(Wales) Tom Lawrence	Macron	Chicken Treat
Sydney FC	(Australia) Patrick Kisnorbo	(Australia) Rhyan Grant	Under Armour	Macquarie University
Wellington Phoenix	(England) Chris Greenacre	(New Zealand) Alex Rufer	Dynasty Sport	Entelar Group; Oppo
Western Sydney Wanderers	(Australia) Ufuk Talay	(Australia) Brandon Borrello	Asics	Westfield; Turner Freeman Lawyers (Note: Away kit)

=== Managerial changes ===
Team	Outgoing manager	Manner of departure	Date of vacancy	Position on table	Incoming manager	Date of appointment
Western Sydney Wanderers	(Australia) Gary van Egmond (caretaker)	End of contract	25 April 2026	Pre-season	(Australia) Ufuk Talay	26 April 2026
Central Coast Mariners	(Australia) Warren Moon	End of contract	25 April 2026	Pre-season	(Malta) John Hutchinson	29 June 2026
Wellington Phoenix	(England) Chris Greenacre (caretaker)	Promoted to full time role	N/A	Pre-season	(England) Chris Greenacre	28 April 2026
Melbourne Victory	(Australia) Arthur Diles	End of contract	19 May 2026	Pre-season	(Venezuela) Giovanni Savarese	18 June 2026
Auckland FC	(Australia) Steve Corica	Signed by Yokohama F. Marinos	19 June 2026	Pre-season	(Portugal) Pedro Moreira	30 July 2026
Macarthur FC	(Australia) Mile Sterjovski	Mutual termination	18 August 2026	Pre-season	(Australia) Sasa Ognenovski	20 August 2026

=== Foreign players ===
Club	Visa 1	Visa 2	Visa 3	Visa 4	Visa 5	Non-visa foreigner(s)	Former player(s)
Adelaide United	(Brazil) Anselmo	(Netherlands) Joshua Smits	(Netherlands) Bart Vriends	(Spain) Juan Muñiz		(South Sudan) Ajak Riak (Note: Australian citizens (or New Zealand citizens, in the case of Auckland FC and/or Wellington Phoenix) who have chosen to represent another national team)	
Auckland FC	(Chile) Felipe Gallegos	(England) Sam Cosgrove	(Japan) Hiroki Sakai	(Norway) Daniel Normann		(Malta) Jake Brimmer	
Brisbane Roar	(Bosnia and Herzegovina) Milorad Stajić	(Germany) Marko Ilic	(Moldova) Virgiliu Postolachi	(South Korea) Nam Tae-hee		(Scotland) Tom Aldred (Note: Those players who were born and started their professional career abroad but have since gained Australian citizenship (or New Zealand citizenship, in the case of Auckland FC and/or Wellington Phoenix))	
Central Coast Mariners	(England) John-Kymani Gordon	(Jamaica) Daniel Scarlett	(Japan) Taiyo Hisamatsu	(Nigeria) Rufai Abubakar	(Scotland) Noah McCann	(New Zealand) Will Martin (New Zealand) Storm Roux	
Macarthur FC	(Japan) Tatsuki Nara	(Scotland) Ryan Fraser	(Scotland) Kai Kennedy			(Indonesia) Luke Vickery	
Melbourne City	(Brazil) Matheus Rossetto	(Costa Rica) Julio Cascante	(Denmark) Emiliano Marcondes	(Japan) Takeshi Kanamori		(Indonesia) Mathew Baker	
Melbourne Victory	(Brazil) Clarismario Santos	(Germany) Philipp Ziereis	(Japan) Charles Nduka	(Uruguay) Guillermo May	(Wales) Tom Lockyer		
Newcastle Jets	(England) Zach Clough	(England) Joe Lolley	(Greece) Nikos Vergos	(Republic of Ireland) Joe Shaughnessy		(Malta) Ethan Debono	
Perth Glory	(New Zealand) Matt Ellis	(New Zealand) Sam Sutton	(Vanuatu) Brian Kaltak	(Wales) Tom Lawrence		(Iraq) Charbel Shamoon (Malta) Lucas Scicluna (North Macedonia) Stefan Colakovski (Republic of Ireland) Jay O'Shea	
Sydney FC	(Democratic Republic of the Congo) Marcel Tisserand	(Japan) Takahiro Sekine	(Nigeria) Oriola Sunday	(Spain) Víctor Campuzano		(New Zealand) Ethan Dyer (Wales) Joe Lacey	
Wellington Phoenix	(Japan) Kazuki Nagasawa	(Mexico) Rafael Durán	(Scotland) Max Anderson	(United States) Bryce Duke			
Western Sydney Wanderers	(Argentina) Germán Ferreyra	(Japan) Hiroshi Ibusuki	(New Zealand) Liam Gillion			(New Zealand) Ricky Fransen	

== Regular season ==
The regular season is made up of a full home-and-away 22-match schedule for each club, plus four extra rounds, for a total of 26 matches played. The top six will qualify for the finals series.

=== League table ===
Pos	Team	Pld	W	D	L	GF	GA	GD	Pts	Qualification
1	Wellington Phoenix (Note: Auckland FC and Wellington Phoenix cannot qualify for Asian Football Confederation competitions as they are based in New Zealand, which is part of the Oceania Football Confederation.)	5	3	1	1	8	3	+5	10	Qualification for the finals series (Note: The top two teams enter the finals series at the semi-finals, while the teams ranked third to sixth enter the finals series at the elimination-finals.)
2	Western Sydney Wanderers	5	2	2	1	10	6	+4	8	Qualification for the AFC Champions League Elite league stage and the finals series
3	Sydney FC	5	2	2	1	7	4	+3	8	Qualification for the AFC Champions League Elite preliminary stage and the finals series
4	Brisbane Roar	4	2	2	0	5	3	+2	8	Qualification for the finals series
5	Macarthur FC	5	2	2	1	6	5	+1	8	Qualification for the finals series
6	Perth Glory	5	2	1	2	8	5	+3	7	Qualification for the finals series
7	Melbourne City	4	2	1	1	6	6	0	7	
8	Auckland FC	5	1	3	1	7	8	−1	6	
9	Melbourne Victory	5	0	4	1	6	7	−1	4	
10	Central Coast Mariners	5	0	3	2	4	9	−5	3	
11	Newcastle Jets	4	0	2	2	4	8	−4	2	
12	Adelaide United	4	0	1	3	5	12	−7	1	

Updated to match(es) played on 22 November 2026. Source: A-Leagues
Rules for classification: 1) points; 2) goal difference; 3) goals scored; 4) wins; 5) head-to-head results; 5a) head-to-head points; 5b) head-to-head goal difference; 6) Fair Play points; 7) away goal difference; 8) away goals per match; 9) home goal difference; 10) home goals per match; 11) toss of a coin in an event of a tie of two clubs.

=== Results ===
Home \ Away	ADL	AKL	BRI	CCM	MAC	MCY	MVC	NEW	PER	SYD	WEL	WSW	ADL	AKL	BRI	CCM	MAC	MCY	MVC	NEW	PER	SYD	WEL	WSW
Adelaide United		1 May	15 Dec	27 Dec	11 Dec	29 Jan	2–2	20 Dec	5 Mar	9 Jan	2 Apr	17 Jan			24 Apr				6 Feb					
Auckland FC	1 Jan		31 Jan	7 Mar	4 Apr	3–1	1–1	13 Mar	24 Jan	12 Dec	0–0	8 May			18 Apr								13 Feb	
Brisbane Roar	14 Mar	1–1		7 Feb	19 Feb	3 Apr	9 Jan	30 Apr	2–1	0–0	23 Jan	19 Dec							21 Mar		30 Dec			
Central Coast Mariners	28 Feb	28 Nov	12 Dec		31 Jan	31 Dec	4 Apr	2–2	0–0	17 Apr	13 Mar	8 Jan					5 May				19 Mar			
Macarthur FC	25 Jan	6 Feb	1–2	20 Dec		27 Nov	26 Apr	6 Mar	2–1	13 Mar	14 Jan	0–0										1 May		18 Apr
Melbourne City	21 Mar	27 Dec	16 Jan	13 Feb	9 Apr		19 Dec	8 May	16 Apr	2–1	10 Jan	2–1				1 May							28 Feb	
Melbourne Victory	17 Apr	15 Jan	9 May	1–1	27 Feb	1–1		12 Dec	3 Jan	26 Jan	29 Dec	14 Feb						6 Mar				10 Apr		
Newcastle Jets	21 Feb	9 Jan	13 Feb	27 Jan	1–1	19 Jan	30 Jan		5 Feb	20 Mar	0–3	26 Feb	10 Apr			25 Apr								
Perth Glory	4–0	10 Apr	27 Feb	16 Jan	8 Jan	11 Dec	14 Mar	2–1		20 Feb	30 Apr	24 Apr	7 May							3 Apr				
Sydney FC	2–1	27 Feb	2 Jan	4–1	28 Dec	7 Feb	6 Dec	16 Jan	18 Dec		7 Mar	0–0		23 Apr										3 Apr
Wellington Phoenix	29 Nov	19 Dec	9 Apr	2–0	1–2	24 Apr	2–1	2 Jan	30 Jan	6 Mar		6 Feb					20 Mar			17 Apr				
Western Sydney Wanderers	4–2	5–2	7 Mar	11 Apr	1 Jan	22 Jan	2 May	26 Dec	5 Dec	30 Jan	13 Dec			20 Mar				12 Mar						

Updated to match(es) played on 22 November 2026. Source: A-Leagues
Legend: Blue = home team win; Yellow = draw; Red = away team win.

== Regular season statistics ==
=== Top scorers ===
As of 22 November 2026

Rank	Player	Club	Goals
1	(Australia) Al Hassan Touré	Sydney FC	4
2	(New Zealand) Lachlan Bayliss	Auckland FC	3
2	(New Zealand) Riley Bidois	Wellington Phoenix	3
2	(Australia) Brandon Borrello	Western Sydney Wanderers	3
2	(New Zealand) Liam Gillion	Western Sydney Wanderers	3
2	(Australia) Jaiden Kucharski	Perth Glory	3
2	(Australia) Oliver Lavale	Central Coast Mariners	3
2	(New Zealand) Corban Piper	Wellington Phoenix	3
9	multiple		2

=== Hat-tricks ===
Player	For	Against	Result	Date	Ref.
(Australia) Al Hassan Toure	Sydney FC	Central Coast Mariners	4–1 (H)	6 November 2026	

Key
(H)	Home team
(A)	Away team

=== Clean sheets ===
As of 22 November 2026

Rank	Goalkeeper	Club	Clean sheets
1	(New Zealand) Henry Gray	Wellington Phoenix	3
2	(Australia) Harrison Devenish-Meares	Sydney FC	2
2	(Australia) Daniel Solsky	Perth Glory	2
2	(Australia) Lawrence Thomas	Western Sydney Wanderers	2
5	(Australia) George Plusnin	Brisbane Roar	1
5	(Australia) Andrew Redmayne	Central Coast Mariners	1
5	(Australia) Alexander Robinson	Macarthur FC	1
5	(New Zealand) Michael Woud	Auckland FC	1

== See also ==
- 2026–27 A-League Women
- 2026–27 Adelaide United FC season
- 2026–27 Auckland FC season
- 2026–27 Brisbane Roar FC season
- 2026–27 Central Coast Mariners FC season
- 2026–27 Macarthur FC season
- 2026–27 Melbourne City FC season
- 2026–27 Melbourne Victory FC season
- 2026–27 Newcastle Jets FC season
- 2026–27 Perth Glory FC season
- 2026–27 Sydney FC season
- 2026–27 Wellington Phoenix FC season
- 2026–27 Western Sydney Wanderers FC season
