= Newcastle Jets FC =

Newcastle Jets
- Full name: Newcastle United Jets Football Club
- Nickname: The Jets
- Founded: 1 August 1999; 27 years ago
- Ground: McDonald Jones Stadium
- Capacity: 33,000
- Owner: Maverick Sports Partners
- Chairman: Maurice Bisetto
- Head coach: Mark Milligan
- League: A-League Men
- 2025–26: 1st of 12 (premiers); Finals: Semi-finals
- Website: newcastlejetsfc.com.au
Home colours	Away colours	Third colours

Newcastle United Jets Football Club, commonly known as Newcastle Jets, is an Australian professional soccer club based in Newcastle, New South Wales. It competes in the country's premier competition, the A-League, under licence from the Australian Professional Leagues (APL) (formerly under licence from Football Australia). The club was formed in 2000 when it joined the National Soccer League (NSL) and was one of only three former NSL clubs to join in the formation of the A-League.

Newcastle Jets have won one A-League championship, after defeating rivals Central Coast Mariners 1–0 in the 2008 A-League Grand Final. In 2009, Newcastle competed in the AFC Champions League for the first time, reaching the Round of 16. In May 2015, FFA revoked Newcastle's licence after owner Nathan Tinkler placed the club into voluntary administration. A new A-League club was formed for the 2015–16 season, under the same name and colours.

In October 2025, the Jets defeated Heidelberg United 3–1 to win the Australia Cup for the first time.

The club plays home games at McDonald Jones Stadium. An affiliated youth team competes in the National Premier Leagues NSW competition. A women's team competes in the A-League Women. The youth team's matches are played at Lake Macquarie Regional Football Facility. The Women's team play at McDonald Jones Stadium and No. 2 Sportsground

== History ==
Chart of yearly table positions for Newcastle Jets in NSL & A-League Men

=== Early years ===
Newcastle United was formed in 2000 by Cypriot-Australian businessman Con Constantine from the remnants of the Newcastle Breakers. The Breakers were dissolved when Soccer Australia revoked its NSL license at the conclusion of the 1999–2000 season. After the formation of Newcastle United, the home ground was moved back to McDonald Jones Stadium.

Newcastle United competed in the NSL Final Series of 2001-02 and 2002-03 and finished second in the League behind Perth Glory in the 2001–02 NSL season.

The club renamed itself to the Newcastle United Jets Football Club and launched a new badge at the start of the new national league, the A-League. This was done in an attempt to project a new image of the club and avoid confusion with the English club Newcastle United. The name "Jets" is a reference to RAAF Base Williamtown, located just 20 kilometres north of Newcastle. The club's logo depicts three F/A-18 Hornets, which the Royal Australian Air Force has based in Williamtown.

Former England and Australia manager Terry Venables was reported as the favourite to become the team's technical director, including reports from the Jets, but declined the role. Instead, the club signed Richard Money for the 2005–2006 season. In 2006, Money was replaced with Nick Theodorakopoulos after Money returned to England to take the manager's job at Walsall. In October 2006, after recording no wins during the Pre-Season Cup and the first seven rounds of A-League matches, Theodorakopoulos became the first coach to be sacked in the club's A-League history. His assistant Gary van Egmond was the caretaker coach for the remainder of the 2005–06 season, and later signed a contract to remain as the coach of the Jets for the next three years.

The club surprised many observers in the Australian game by signing Ned Zelic, the second big name signing of the inaugural A-League, signing a two year contract as the clubs marquee player and the Jets inaugural club captain.

The Jets attempted to bring former Liverpool and England striker Stan Collymore out of retirement for a four-match guest stint; however, the move broke down within 24 hours of it being made public.

With the leadership of Gary van Egmond, crowds in Newcastle reached all time highs, culminating in a crowd of over 24,000 for their home final against Sydney FC on 2 February 2007.

Newcastle were eliminated in penalties in the preliminary final by Adelaide. Vaughan Coveny and Stuart Musialik missed their attempts in a shoot-out that ended up at 4–3 in favour of Adelaide, costing Newcastle their place in the grand final and a berth in the Asian Champions League.

=== Champions of Australia (2008) ===
Season 3 of the A-League saw a number of Newcastle's biggest stars of the previous season leave the club. Captain Paul Okon retired, fan favourite Milton Rodriguez returned to Colombia and Johnny Warren Medal winner Nick Carle moved to Turkey to join with Gençlerbirliği S.K. New recruits included Joel Griffiths' twin brother Adam and previous European Golden Boot winner Mario Jardel. Throughout the season, star striker Joel Griffiths broke the record for most goals in a regular season by scoring 12 in 21 rounds.

The Jets started the season 5-0 but struggled for consistency until the end of the season. Wins in the last three competition rounds saw the Jets move up the ladder to equal points with the Central Coast Mariners, finishing the season in second place due to inferior goal difference. The Jets went on to play the Mariners in the two legged Major Semi Final. The Jets won the first leg at home 2–0 thanks to a first-half header from Adam Griffiths and a late penalty from his brother Joel. The game was controversial as Mariners striker John Aloisi had a seemingly legitimate goal disallowed and also missed a penalty. Steeled by the defeat in the first leg, the Mariners overturned the 2–0 deficit and won to advance to their second Grand Final in three years.

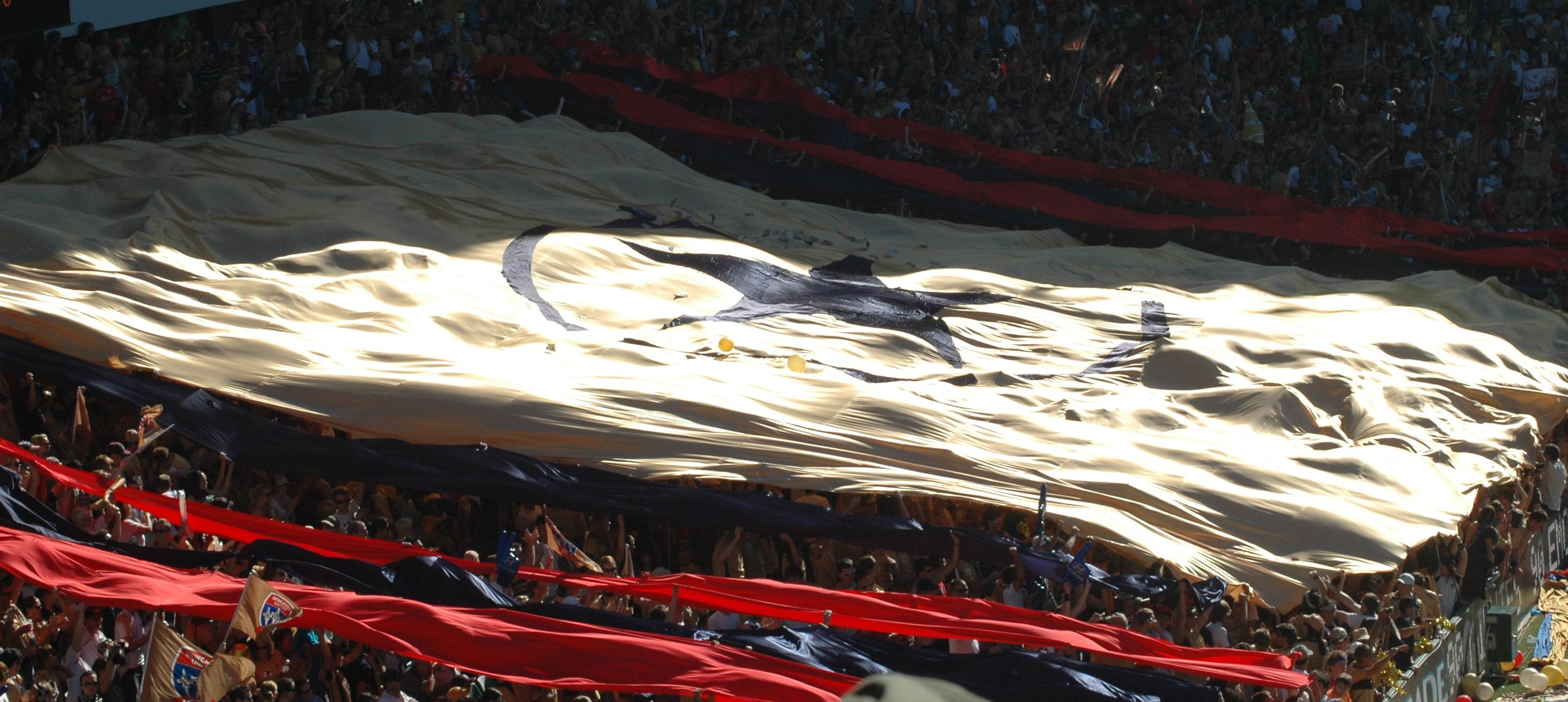
Newcastle Jets Squadron Banner before the 2007–08 Grand Final

The Jets qualified for their first A-League Grand Final by beating the Queensland Roar 3–2 in the 2008 Preliminary Final on 17 February 2008.

The Jets defeated the Central Coast Mariners in the 2007–08 A-League Grand Final, in front of 36,354 fans, becoming A-League Champions for the first time.

The game was sealed with a solitary Mark Bridge strike in the 63rd minute after an error from Tony Vidmar. The game was marred by a late penalty appeal for a handball. Mariners goalkeeper Danny Vukovic had come up for the corner and was so infuriated by referee Mark Shield's decision that he slapped his hand away, earning a lengthy ban and ruling himself out of the early rounds of the next season. Both the Jets and Mariners qualified to take part in the 2009 AFC Champions League.

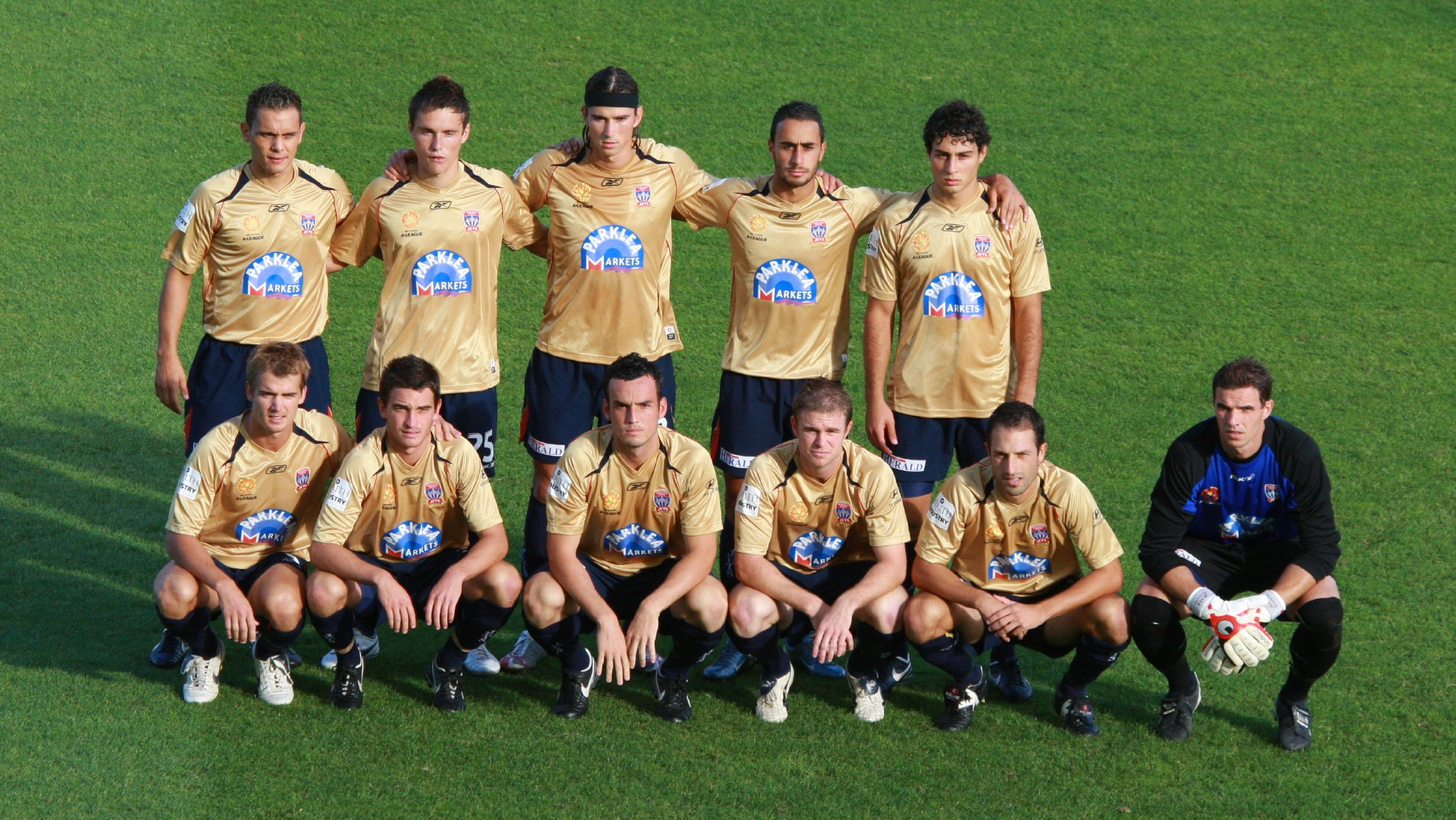
Newcastle Jets starting line-up in 2008

After the departure of high performance manager Ian Crook, the Jets signed former Sydney FC boss Branko Culina as their new Technical Director.

After the success of the 2007–08 season, a number of Jets players left the club, including Mark Bridge and Stuart Musialik to Sydney FC and Joe Marston Medal winner Andrew Durante and Troy Hearfield to Wellington Phoenix. Although rumours persisted about captain Jade North and Adam Griffiths wishing to leave the club after being a part of the Socceroos squad that faced Singapore and China, both chose to remain with the Jets for the 2008–09 season. The regular season proved to be a disaster for the Jets. The team won only four out of twenty-one matches and were rooted to the bottom of the ladder, missing the finals for the first time, and collecting their first wooden spoon.

=== Branko Culina reigns (2009–2011) ===
Preparations for the following season were thrown into turmoil when championship-winning manager Gary van Egmond left the club for a lucrative job with the Australian Institute of Sport. That created a public rift between the club and FFA over FFA's possible involvement in inducing van Egmond to break his contract by taking up the new position. The relationship between owner and FFA fell to the point where the club has threatened legal action against both the FFA and van Egmond for breach of contract. Former club technical director, Branko Culina, was named as his replacement on 30 June 2009.

==== AFC Champions League debut ====
In order to rebuild the team for the 2009 AFC Champions League, the Jets signed Perth defender Nikolai Topor-Stanley in early January 2008. But the signing of Topor-Stanley would prove to be the Jets' sole gain on the transfer market for several weeks, and fans grew even more disgruntled as the Jets were confirmed as the 2009 A-League "Wooden Spooners" with a 2–0 loss to Adelaide United in mid-January. An encouraging 2–1 win over Perth Glory in the Jets' final home game of the A-League 2008-09 season lightened the mood somewhat, but when the Jets crashed in a 4–0 capitulation at the Sydney Football Stadium the following week, things were looking grim. And the picture only grew bleaker as the notorious player exodus continued and the club lost Socceroos defender Mark Milligan to Shanghai Shenhua, along with Jesper Hakansson, who left the club after agreeing to a mutual termination. Talisman and captain Joel Griffiths also agreed to move to Asia, although only on a one-year loan to Beijing Guoan.

The Jets got off to a bad start, losing 2–0 to Beijing Guoan in Beijing. However, they rebounded with a 2–0 defeat of Ulsan Hyundai Horang-i back in Newcastle. After a heroic 1–1 draw in Japan against Nagoya Grampus, they lost 1–0 in the return fixture. Then, on 6 May, the Jets grabbed two goals in the last two minutes to defeat Beijing in Newcastle 2–1. The Jets qualified for the last 16 by defeating Ulsan Hyundai 1–0 away from home with Jason Hoffman scoring his debut goal to seal the win. The Jets faced Pohang Steelers in their round of 16 fixture on 24 June, crashing out of the competition 6–0 to the hands of the South Koreans.

The first ten days of league season saw the Jets engage in a surprisingly successful flurry of transfer activity to bolster their squad for the impending Champions League before 11 February date by which clubs are required to submit their squad lists. Acting on an urgent need to improve their attacking stocks, the Jets announced simultaneously the signing of Dutchman Donny de Groot from De Graafschap along with former Sydney FC and Central Coast Mariners striker Sasho Petrovski. Next, the Jets reinforced their shaky defence by obtaining the signatures of talented former FC Thun and Melbourne Victory defender Ljubo Miličević, who had been battling depression since being released by the Victory, veteran centre-back Angelo Costanzo from Adelaide United, and young Sydney FC left-back Nikolas Tsattalios. These signings were followed by the surprise announcement that the Jets had secured the services of former S.S. Lazio forward Fabio Vignaroli on a six-month contract. In a further boost for the depth of its squad, the club signed three local players on six-month deals with the option for an extension into the 2009–10 A-League season: former Newcastle United midfielder Mitchell Johnson and strikers Peter Haynes and Joel Wood.

In the 2009–10 Season, the Jets qualified for the finals series after coming sixth in the regular season. In the first week of the finals the Jets unexpectedly defeated Gold Coast in a penalty shoot-out 6 goals to 5, after the full time score had been 0–0. In the second week, they played Wellington Phoenix. The full time score was 1–1, but in extra time, Paul Ifill scored the match winner for Wellington followed by a goal from Eugène Dadi, putting the Jets out of the competition.

Prior to Newcastle's round 4 game against Brisbane Roar, it was revealed that the club was under significant financial stress and was unable to pay staff and player wages on time. That resulted in the club seeking either a loan or an advance on their quarterly share of the A-League television deal. It was announced by the club and Football Federation Australia that the governing body would provide a short-term assistance package, making sure the club made it through their next few games and back into financial viability.

After weeks of speculation about the future of the Jets, it was announced by the FFA on 22 September, before the team's midweek game against Gold Coast United, that businessman Nathan Tinkler would buy a majority share in the Jets, saving the club from ruin. Tinkler had a positive influence at the Jets. A new price for tickets included a free season pass for children younger than 15, a family pass for 11 home games with reserved grandstand for $100, and general admission for $10.

The club gained the Hunter Medical Research Institute as a new sponsor, and its logo appeared on the front of the players shirts. The Institute said it would donate $5000 for every goal scored at home and $2500 for an away goal. The club set up a new administration office, extended the contract of coach Branko Culina until March 2015, and unveiled a $2.5 million blueprint for the football department. It was confirmed that the Jets would host Los Angeles Galaxy, which included big-name players such as David Beckham and Landon Donovan, for a friendly in November 2010. The Jets won the match 2–1.

During the January transfer window, the Jets announced the signing of Ryan Griffiths, the brother of Newcastle Jets legend Joel Griffiths, for the remainder of the season and the 2011–2012 season. With the future of North Queensland Fury in doubt, the Newcastle Jets signed Chris Payne for the 2011–2012 season. 16 December 2010 saw the inaugural meeting of the new Football Advisory Board put in place by new owner Nathan Tinkler. The board included prominent names from Newcastle's soccer history, community members, and the president of Northern NSW Football. The Jets finished the 2010–11 season in seventh position, narrowly missing out on the finals series on the last day of the regular season.

=== The Return of Gary van Egmond (2011–2014) ===
On 4 October 2011, the club terminated the contract of coach Branko Culina, as well commencing the process of applying to the FFA to have the three-year "marquee" contract of (Culina's son) Jason set aside. Although no one reason was cited for the decision it was believed that an argument was reached between Branko, CEO Robbie Middleby, and owner Nathan Tinkler, regarding the nepotist nature of Jason's signing, as well as "medical advice". Middleby stated: "The decision to terminate the contracts was made after a long deliberation by the Newcastle Jets’ Advisory Board". While Tinkler stated that "Jason's injury could mean the Jets are without their marquee player for up to three seasons – not a good result for the club, supporters, sponsors and players." The Jets appointed Gary van Egmond as Culina's replacement.

In April 2012, Nathan Tinkler announced that he would hand back the Newcastle Jets A-League licence to the FFA, because of his mounting financial difficulties. The Federation said that Tinkler's Hunter Sports Group could not just hand back its licence, and was breaching a binding contract by walking away from the Jets. On 1 May, after face-to-face talks between Tinkler and FFA chairman Frank Lowy, it was announced that Tinkler would remain the owner of the club.

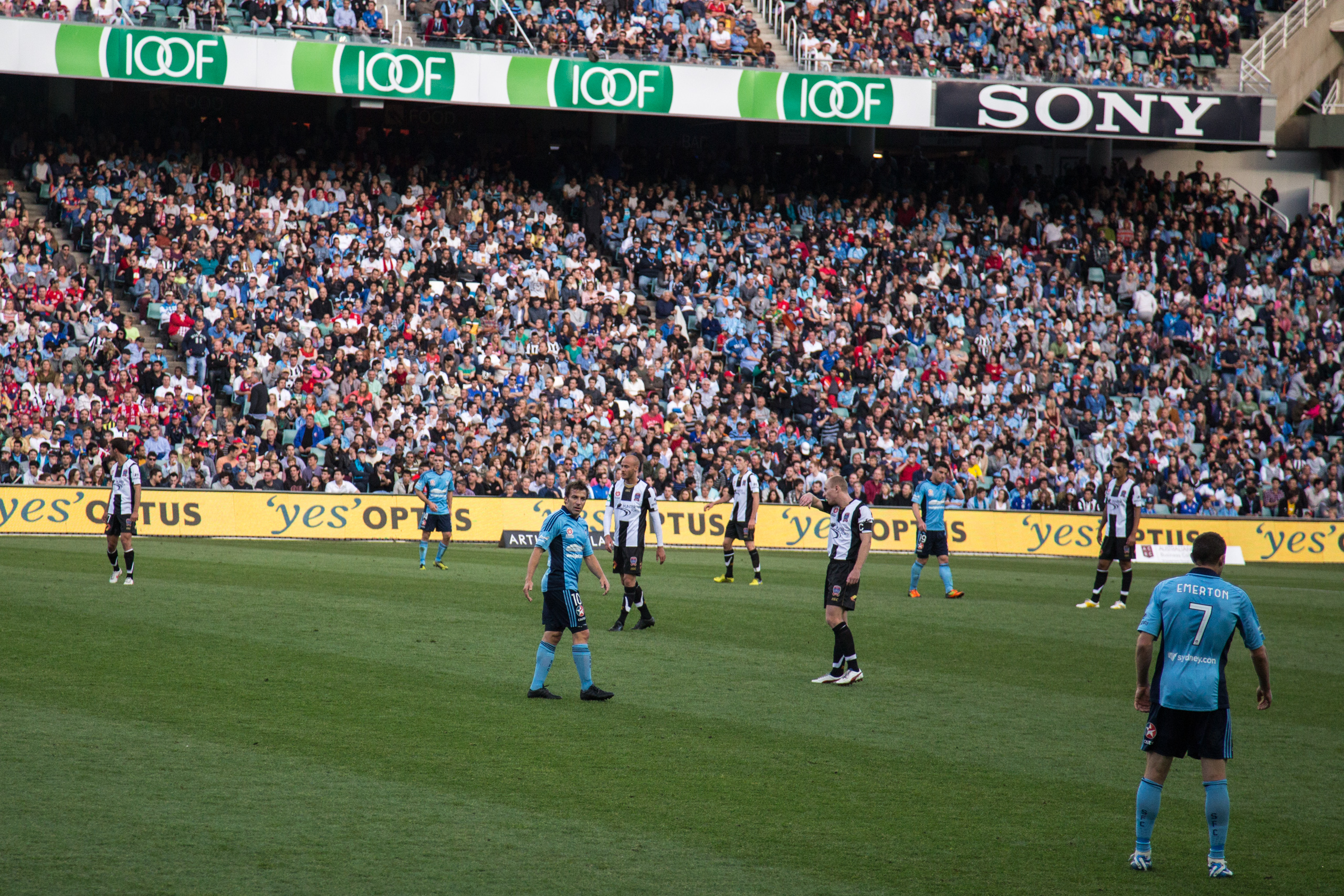
Newcastle Jets playing against Sydney FC in October 2012.

At the end of the 2011–12 A-League season, Gary van Egmond started a clean-out by getting rid of the majority of Branko Čulina's squad. That including fan-favourites Jeremy Brockie, Tarek Elrich, Labinot Haliti and Nikolai Topor-Stanley. Van Egmond implemented his possession-based style by signing many young talents such as James Brown, Scott Neville and Craig Goodwin. The Jets went unbeaten throughout the entire 2012–13 pre-season, with wins over defending champions Brisbane Roar and rivals Central Coast Mariners.

On 21 September 2012, the Jets signed former England international and Premier League giant Emile Heskey as their marquee player for the 2012–13 season. Heskey signed for a one-year deal but hoped to extend his stay. He wore the number 9 jersey throughout his time in Newcastle. The Jets lost their first game of the season against Adelaide United, but then went on to beat Sydney FC, rivals Central Coast Mariners and Melbourne Victory, to sit second behind Adelaide on goal difference after round 4.

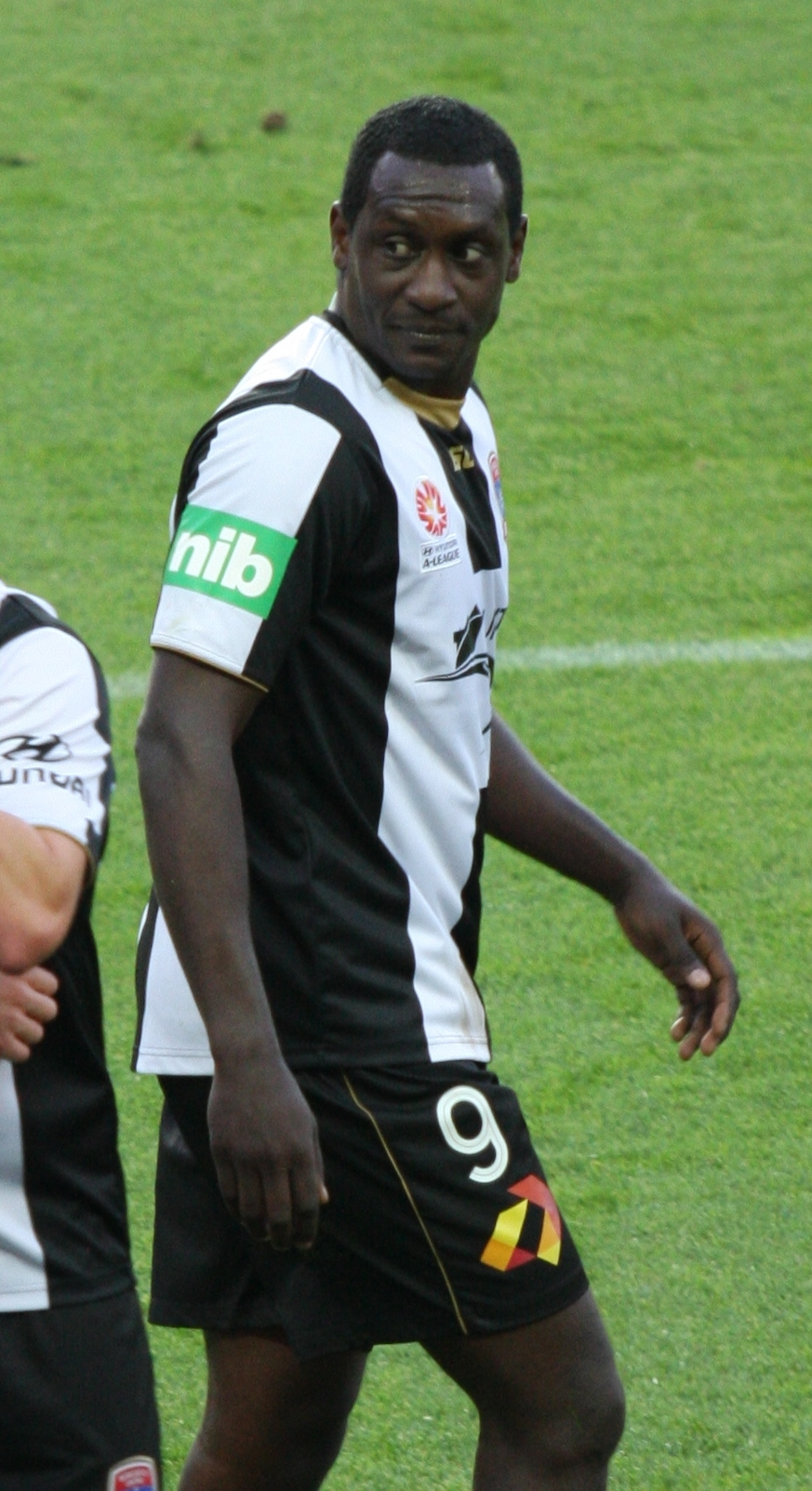
Emile Heskey played for the club from 2012 until 2014

During the January transfer window, the Jets released Brazilian international Tiago Calvano, due to his lack of game time and falling out of favour with head coach Gary van Egmond. The Jets replaced Tiago with attacking midfielder Zenon Caravella, and signed local talent Andrew Hoole to his first professional contract after he impressed in the round 15 match against the Brisbane Roar. On 31 January 2013, club captain and foundation player Jobe Wheelhouse, terminated his contract because he wanted a break from football. Ruben Zadkovich wore the captain's arm band for the rest of the season. The Jets finished 8th, missing out on the finals for the third year in a row. During the following season, van Egmond was sacked after 15 matches, due to poor results and a lack of harmony within the squad.

=== Near close performances (2014–2017) ===
On 5 May 2014, Phil Stubbins signed a two-year coaching contract at the Jets. The club hoped that Stubbins' attacking mentality would bring success, along with a number of new signings, such as Argentinians Jeronimo Neumann and Marcos Flores, Australian international David Carney, and the club's highest-ever goal scorer, Joel Griffiths. A poor start to the season saw CEO Robbie Middleby and chairman Ray Baartz resign from their positions during a mid-season break. On 10 January 2015, three days after Middleby and Baartz resigned, Newcastle owner Nathan Tinkler took the club off the market and was appointed chairman. On 29 January 2015, Newcastle players Kew Jaliens, Billy Celeski, Adrian Madaschi, David Carney and Joel Griffiths were released. Stubbins started rebuilding the club, bringing in imports Lee Ki-je and Enver Alivodic, along with signing defender Nigel Boogaard. The Jets ended the season at the bottom of the table with only three wins, making it their worst-ever season. On 21 May, Football Federation Australia terminated the club's licence after the Jets failed to settle debts and pay problems.

On 21 May 2015, the FFA issued a licence for a new team in Newcastle, indicating that the new entity would continue to hold the Newcastle Jets' name and colours, and would continue to play its games at Hunter Stadium. All players, along with the administration staff, were issued new contracts. The coaching staff, however, underwent a performance review by FFA. Consequently, on 26 May, Phil Stubbins, along with fellow coaching staff Mark Jones, James Pascoe and Jess Vanstrattan, all had their contracts terminated by the FFA, which wanted a fresh start for the club. The FFA began the rebuilding process by setting up three forums: a business forum, a members' forum and a supporters' forum, so that fans could voice their opinions about the club's restructuring. On 18 June 2015, the FFA appointed former Fulham assistant coach, Scott Miller as the club's head coach. Former Melbourne Victory assistant coach, Jean-Paul de Marigny was appointed as Miller's senior assistant.

On Thursday 10 September 2015, the club announced its new major sponsor, Inspirations Paint. Acting CEO, David Eland said, "To get a brand like Inspirations Paint behind the club is absolutely fantastic. They are Australia's largest and leading network of paint stores, founded here in 1979. I think it's a sign that the community are starting to re-align with their club."

On Tuesday 14 June 2016, it was announced that the FFA had completed the sale of the club to the Ledman Group, a leading high-tech LED signage manufacturer, operator and sports business, headquartered in Shenzhen, China. The Ledman Group was valued at over one billion Australian dollars on the Shenzhen Stock Exchange. The Ledman Group was an official partner of the Chinese Super League and China League (Division Two), and had a strategic partnership with the Chinese Football Association.

In September 2016, Scott Miller was dismissed by the club. Later that month, the club announced that previous club assistant and fitness coach, Mark Jones, would take the reins for the 2016–17 season. However, his coaching tenure at Newcastle was brought to an end after a 2–0 away loss to Sydney FC, which saw the club receive their second wooden spoon in three seasons.

On Friday 30 September 2016, the club announced Inspirations Paint had re-signed as a Major Sponsor for a further year. Newcastle Jets Chief Executive Officer, Lawrie McKinna, announced the news recently at the launch of #TheJetsHouse opposite Hunter Stadium in Broadmeadow – a painted home which has been decked out in Jets colours and branding by the Inspirations Paint for the entirety of the club's Hyundai A-League 2016/17 campaign.

=== Ernie Merrick Era (2017–2020) ===
==== 2017–18 season ====
On 9 May 2017, Ernie Merrick was named as Newcastle's new coach for the next two A-League seasons after previously managing A-League teams Melbourne Victory and Wellington Phoenix, managing a total of 241 A-League games, and winning the 2006–07, 2008–09 titles.

After the announcement Merrick stated:

I believe that the club has all the necessary ingredients for on-field success, with a strong core of good quality players, a very competent staff, excellent facilities, and most importantly a wealth of extremely passionate fans.

Merrick's first A-League match as coach was on 7 October 2017, against F3 Derby rivals Central Coast Mariners, with the Mariners having won the previous meeting 2–0 at home. Newcastle won the game 1–5, beating the Mariners by four goals and making it the largest F3 Derby victory. After Newcastle's first game, they followed up by going five games undefeated, losing their first game of the season on 18 November 2017, to 2016–17 champions, Sydney FC in round 7. Between rounds 7 and 24 Newcastle achieved 10 wins, 3 draws, and 3 losses, before losing three games on the trot, scoring only two and conceding ten. In the last game of the regular season Newcastle again played F3 Derby rivals, Central Coast, playing them for a third time during the season. After three consecutive losses Newcastle made both A-League and F3 derby history, beating the Mariners 2–8, winning by the highest margin in the F3 derby, a feat they achieved in round 1 of the season. Playing in the highest scoring A-League match, winning all three F3 Derby matches during the 2017–18 season and finishing in second position and qualifying for the AFC Champions League for a second time. After one of the most successful regular seasons in Newcastle Jets history, manager Ernie Merrick signed on for a further season extending his contract to the end of the 2019–20 A-League season.

Newcastle played Melbourne City at home in the semi-final of the A-League finals, winning 2–1, with goals to Riley McGree and Jason Hoffman – McGree's goal came from a scorpion kick that was subsequently nominated for the Puskás Award. Newcastle reached their second A-League Grand Final in history, and their first to be hosted at home, facing Melbourne Victory – Newcastle were ultimately defeated 1–0 in controversial circumstances, as the only goal was scored from an offside assist that was undetected by VAR. Dimitri Petratos was named Newcastle Jets player of the season. After a very successful season in the A-League, Andrew Nabbout, a former Newcastle player, and Dimitri Petratos, Newcastle player of the season and joint golden boot winner for Newcastle, were named in the Australian squad for the 2018 FIFA World Cup. Nabbout played in two of the three group stage matches (France, Denmark).

==== 2018–19 season ====
Before the start of the 2018–19 A-League season, Newcastle signed New Zealand international Matthew Ridenton from fellow A-League club Wellington Phoenix on a free transfer which reunited him with former Phoenix boss Ernie Merrick. The Jets also announced the signings of Brazilian striker Jair Eduardo, former Melbourne Victory winger Mitch Austin, attacker Kaine Sheppard and goalkeeper Lewis Italiano prior to the start of the season.

Newcastle enjoyed their best ever run in the FFA Cup, beating Queensland side Gold Coast Knights 0–1 in the Round of 32. In the Round of 16, the Jets went down to fellow A-League side Melbourne City 0–1.

=== Ownership uncertainty and managerial changes (2020–2024) ===
After a poor start to the season where the Jets only won 2 of their first 13 A-League matches and sat at the bottom of the table, Ernie Merrick was sacked as manager. Newcastle Jets Women coach Craig Deans and Qiang Li were named joint-caretaker managers the same day. On 6 February, former Vancouver Whitecaps manager Carl Robinson was named as the club's new head coach signing a deal until the end of the 2022–23 season. The club won 4 of their first 7 league matches under Robinson's stewardship, losing only once, before the FFA announced that the 2019–20 A-League season would be postponed until further notice due to the COVID-19 pandemic in Australia and New Zealand on 24 March 2020.

Although the Jets results had improved under Robinson, he departed the club in October 2021 to assume the vacant managerial position at Western Sydney Wanderers. The timing of Robinson's departure was not ideal for Newcastle who were close to commencing the 2020–21 season. Craig Deans subsequently returned for his third stint as interim manager.

On 4 January 2021, it was reported that the Jets' licence had been terminated and absentee owner Martin Lee, who had not injected any funds into the club since October 2019 and had failed to pay club debts, had been removed. The Jets were controlled for an interim period by investors from other A-League clubs, to whom a new licence was granted. Australian Professional Leagues commissioner Greg O'Rourke confirmed that the club could continue to play in A-League and W-League competitions despite the uncertainty.

After a positive start to the season, Deans was appointed as the full-time head coach on 9 February. However the Jets experienced a downturn in results, only winning a further two matches and narrowly avoiding the wooden spoon. Deans resigned on 2 June.

On 28 June 2021, Newcastle Jets appointed Arthur Papas as manager.

On 19 June 2023, Arthur Papas resigned as manager.

On 26 June 2023, Newcastle Jets announced the appointment of Rob Stanton as Head Coach of the A-League Men's side for the next two seasons.

=== Back to glory days (2024–present) ===
On 11 June 2024, the Jets announced that Maverick Sports Partners would become the new owners of the club. The new owners, spearheaded by Executive Director Maurice Bisseto, brought stability to the club after years of ownership uncertainty.

The Jets began their new era in the 2024 Australia Cup, defeating Western United and Rockdale Ilinden, before being knocked out by eventual champions Macarthur in the Round of 16.

==== Domestic double ====
On 4 October 2025, The Jets then went on to advance all the way to the 2025 Australia Cup final where they would face Heidelberg United. The game was tied at 1–1 thus bringing the game to extra time. Oscar Fryer and Ben Gibson then scored the winning goal to secure a 3–1 win to ensure that Newcastle Jets become the 2025 Australia Cup champions. The Jets would continue with the silverware run the same season by winning the 2025–26 A-League Men Premiership for the first in club history by outright finishing top league season table with one game remaining in the season thus seeing the club qualifying to the 2026–27 AFC Champions League Elite for the first time since the 2019 edition.

== Team image ==
=== Supporters ===
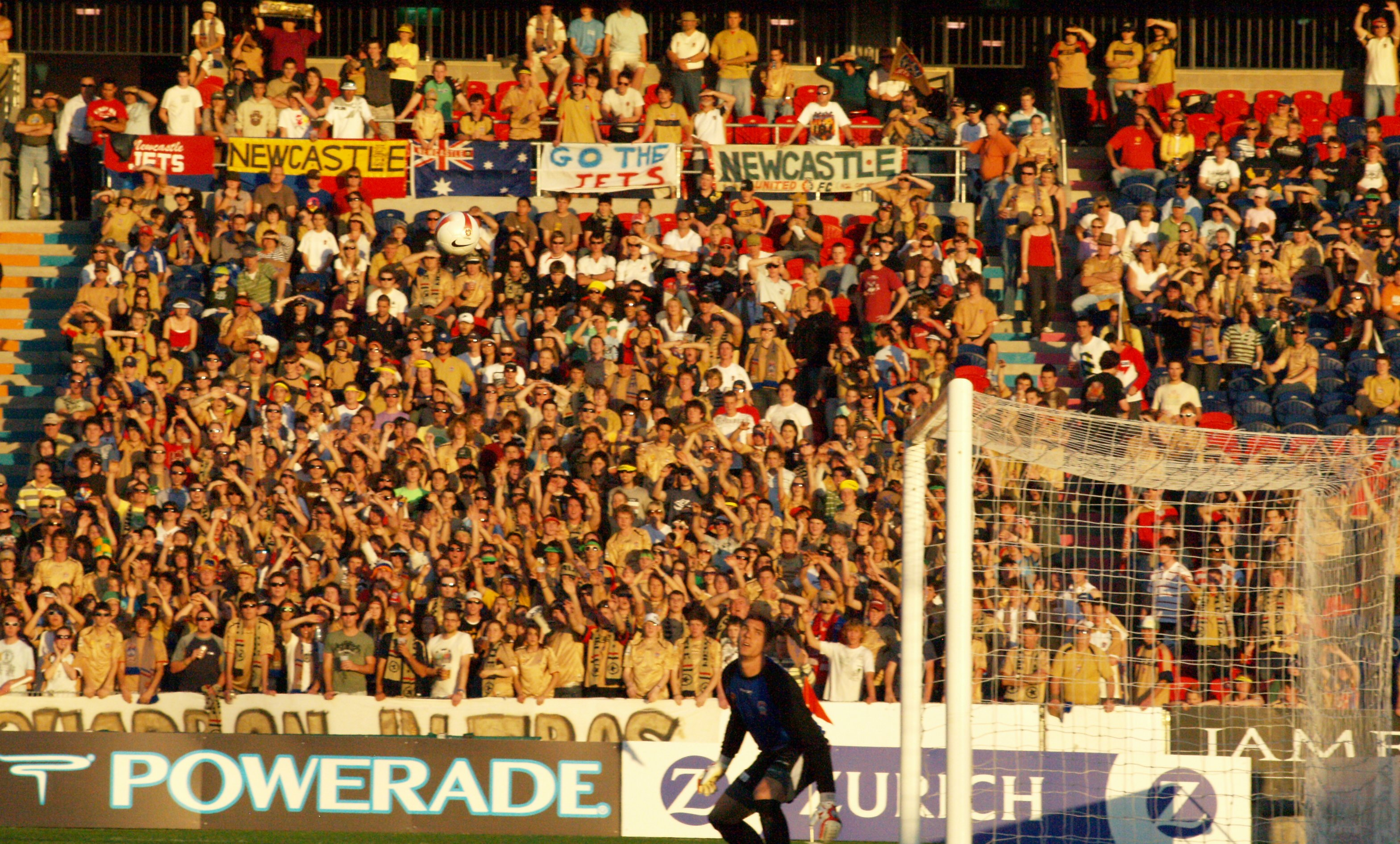
Squadron Novocastria during the 2007–08 A-League.

The main active supporter group of the Newcastle Jets were the Squadron Novocastria, which was formed in anticipation of the first ever A-League game between Newcastle and Adelaide United. The Squadron began standing behind the goals on the Southern Hill, however because of the layout of the stadium and FFA regulations requiring them to be located in a fully seated area, they moved to Bay 2 of the Eastern Grandstand at McDonald Jones Stadium. Standard songs/chants include, "We go by land and sea", "The Newy Boys go one by one" and "When The Jets Go Flying In". The Squadron have also started a new tradition of singing the chorus to the INXS song "Never Tear Us Apart" before the start of the game and second half. As the club's performances improved throughout the 2006–07 season the Squadron grew rapidly and continued to grow throughout the 2007–08 season.

In the interest of increasing active support participation during the 2013–14 season, and after months of negotiation with club, stadium and security, the Squadron initiated a move from their Bay 2 location, to the other side of the stadium in Bay 60. This took effect for the first time for the visit of the Western Sydney Wanderers on 31 January 2014. The Newcastle Herald reported that this was to avoid clashes with opposition fans.

Before the start of the 2014–15 season the Squadron threatened to boycott the designated active supporter bay due to measures introduced by the FFA, which meant that the area would be a "members only" area. The Squadron believed this would adversely affect the large demographic of young people regularly joining the Squadron, along with other issues. However through negotiation with the club the Squadron ensured that all fans, members or not were able to join the Squadron on matchday and so the boycott was avoided. For the 2016–17 A-League season, the Squadron, with financial support from the Jets, moved to the southern end of McDonald Jones Stadium in a bid to improve active support at home games.

In late 2016, a new supporter group, the Newcastle City Legionaries (NCL) was formed by previous founders of the Squadron. The group sits in Bay 1, a general admission bay of McDonald Jones Stadium, and aims to be a "traditional" supporter group, by engaging in "English style" active support (i.e. no capo, and anybody can start chants). The group has received praise from Lawrie McKinna, who credited the group with engaging with the crowd, and creating a great atmosphere.

On 22 April 2017, the Squadron announced that they would be ceasing active support, due to harsh FFA restrictions regarding active support. Although the Squadron resumed active support during the 2017–18 season, declining attendances and poor on-field performances the following season resulted in the group dissolving once more.

=== Rivalries ===
Due to its geographical proximity, Newcastle shares a strong rivalry with Central Coast Mariners. Known as The F3 Derby, the first meeting between the teams resulted in a tough semi-final tie in the 2005 Oceania Club Championship qualification competition (held in May 2005, prior to the start of the inaugural A-League season), when star Mariners striker Nik Mrdja broke the leg of Newcastle defender Andrew Durante, earning him a tag as Newcastle's "hate-boy". In the 2007–08 season, Newcastle Jets beat the Mariners 2–0 in the first leg of the Major Semi-Final, before being beaten 3–0 in extra time in the second leg at Bluetongue Stadium. After beating Queensland Roar 3–2 in the Preliminary Final, the Jets then went on to defeat the Mariners 1–0 in the 2007/08 A-League Grand Final. In round 17 of the 2008/09 season, the Jets and Mariners faced each other at Ausgrid Stadium. The Mariners won the game 2–1 courtesy of a Matt Simon goal in the 80th minute. After the full-time whistle, star Jets striker Joel Griffiths grabbed Mariners midfielder John Hutchinson around the neck causing players from both sides to intervene. Referee Peter O'Leary sent off Mariners' striker Dylan Macallister for abusive language.

== Kit suppliers and shirt sponsors ==
Newcastle United strip (2000–04)

Period	Kit manufacturer	A-League kit partners
Period	Kit manufacturer	Shirt (major)
2005–2011	(United States) Reebok	(Australia) Centrebet
2011–2014	(Australia) ISC	(Australia) Hunter Ports
2014–2015	(Australia) BLK	(Australia) Castle Quarry Products
2015–2016	(Australia) BLK	(Australia) Beachwood Homes
2016–2017	(Australia) BLK	(Australia) Inspirations Paint
2017–2020	(Australia) VIVA	(Australia) Ledman (Note: in 2019, the City of Newcastle were the shirt sponsors for the AFC Champions League competition)
2021-2021	(Australia) Apelle	(Australia) Inspirations Paint
2021–2025	(Australia) VIVA	(Australia) Port of Newcastle
2025–2028	(United States) New Balance	(Australia) Emerald Horizon

The club's traditional colours are blue and red; colours also worn by the Newcastle Knights rugby league team in the region. When Newcastle joined the A-League the club changed its colours to a gold jersey with a navy and red trim and navy blue shorts and socks. The kit was markedly different to the jersey worn by the original NSL club which was almost exclusively red and blue. The away jersey was white with gold sleeves, gold shorts and white socks. The club's jersey for the 2009–10 season retained the home kit design, however, the away strip revert to something more historic, in light of the club's tenth anniversary. The jersey featured blue and red, with white and blue shorts and socks, in line with the old Newcastle United strips. In early 2011, the new Tinkler Sports Group revealed that Newcastle's colours would revert to the blue and red worn by Newcastle United. The decision was also made to combined colours with the Newcastle Knights who became a cousin club due to the shared ownership. The 2011–12 season away kit was revealed to be a black and white, with the same stripped design of the home kit. The Jets wore the black and white kit until the conclusion of the 2012–13 season. It was after the conclusion of that season when it was announced that Newcastle Jets members would vote for the sides new away kit. The first of three options was an emerald jersey with a brown and white stripe going diagonally across the shirt, based on KB United, a team that represented Newcastle in the NSL. The second was a white jersey that featured red down the sides, and blue on the back at the base of the shirt. The final option was a dark grey jersey, with a red and blue diagonal stripe, the same design as the first option. After members chose the emerald green jersey, the club revealed a new home kit. Similar to the home shirt from the previous two seasons, the red and blue stripes became slightly thinner, featuring five stripes on the front of the jersey, opposed to three stripes on the former kit. The stripes were largely replaced on the back of the shirt with a solid blue, yet stripes still featured at the bottom. The three jets from the club's crest were also added to the back of both the home and away kits, located just underneath the neck.

A simple blue and red logo with the name "Newcastle United" was used during the club's time in the NSL. After joining the A-League, a new logo was designed to incorporate the new name "Newcastle United Jets". The name change was done so to project a new image for the club and to prevent confusion with the English side Newcastle United The name "Jets" is a reference to RAAF Base Williamtown, located just 20 kilometres north of Newcastle. The club's logo also depicts three F/A-18 Hornets, which the Royal Australian Air Force had based at Williamtown.

== Stadium ==
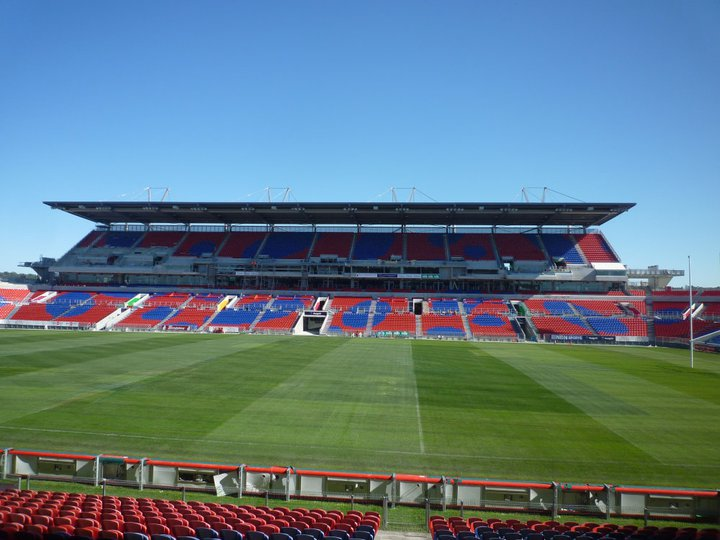
Western stand of Newcastle International Sports Centre

McDonald Jones Stadium, at the Newcastle International Sports Centre, is the home ground of the Newcastle Jets and is the home of the Newcastle Knights. It has a capacity of 33,000. The stadium is located in the suburb of Broadmeadow.

The record crowd for a soccer match in Newcastle was set at Ausgrid Stadium on 2 February 2007 in the second leg of the 2006-07 A-League minor semi final against Sydney FC, in front of 24,338 people. This broke the record set earlier that season on New Years Day, where a crowd of 20,980 turned up to see a 2–0 loss against the same opposition. Prior to that game the soccer attendance record for a match in Newcastle stood for 52 years, set when Australia played Rapid Vienna.

This upgrade is a result of Australia gaining rights to hold the finals of the 2015 AFC Asian Cup in Australia between 4 and 26 January 2015. Newcastle may be one of the venues for this event, and minimum standards set by FIFA mean EAS is inadequate for this role. The newest upgrade involved demolishing the western grandstand and replacing it with one similar to the east, as well as placing seated areas on the hill at either end of the ground. This upgrade cost around $60 million, of which $50 million was provided by the State Government. This upgrade means the Jets attendance figures can grow immensely, and will also qualify the Jets to host any Grand Finals they reach in the future.

During the Australia Cup, the Newcastle Jets play at Maitland Sports Ground.

== Players ==
=== First-team squad ===
As of 22 October 2026

Note: Flags indicate national team as defined under FIFA eligibility rules; some limited exceptions apply. Players may hold more than one non-FIFA nationality.

No.	Pos.	Nation	Player
1	GK	AUS	James Delianov
2	DF	AUS	Alex Grant
5	DF	IRL	Joe Shaughnessy (vice-captain)
6	MF	AUS	Zane Schreiber
8	FW	AUS	Patrick Wood
9	FW	GRE	Nikos Vergos
10	MF	ENG	Zach Clough
11	FW	ENG	Joe Lolley
14	MF	AUS	Max Burgess (captain)
16	DF	AUS	Will Kennedy
17	FW	MLT	Ethan Debono
19	MF	AUS	Alexander Badolato
20	GK	AUS	Alex Nassiep
22	DF	AUS	Joel Bertolissio

No.	Pos.	Nation	Player
23	DF	AUS	Daniel Wilmering
24	MF	AUS	Alex Nunes (scholarship)
25	FW	AUS	Oscar Fryer (scholarship)
26	FW	AUS	Oscar Gonzalez
27	MF	AUS	Julian Recchia (scholarship)
28	MF	AUS	Will Dobson
29	FW	AUS	Jake Goodwin (scholarship)
34	DF	AUS	Angus Reid (scholarship)
37	FW	AUS	Oliver Cockle (scholarship)
39	DF	AUS	Thomas Aquilina
40	GK	AUS	Jordan Baylis (scholarship)
42	DF	AUS	Max Cooper (scholarship)
43	FW	AUS	Xavier Bertoncello (scholarship)
52	MF	AUS	Nicholas Badolato (scholarship)

=== Youth ===
- Includes players who have appeared in a match-day or extended squad, but are not members of the first team.

Note: Flags indicate national team as defined under FIFA eligibility rules; some limited exceptions apply. Players may hold more than one non-FIFA nationality.

No.	Pos.	Nation	Player
63	DF	AUS	Callan Prestwidge
64	FW	AUS	Jesse Hill

No.	Pos.	Nation	Player
65	DF	AUS	Kaiden Walshe

== Personnel ==
=== Current technical staff ===
Position	Staff
Head Coach	(Australia) Mark Milligan
Assistant Coach	(Australia) Nick Stavroulakis (Australia) Ruben Zadkovich
Goalkeeping Coach	(Australia) Jess Vanstrattan
Head Performance Analyst	(Australia) Caleb Wickens
Head Physiotherapist	(Australia) Justin Dougherty
Strength and Conditioning Coach	(Australia) Chris Smith
Football Operation's Manager	(Australia) Adrian Talevski
Kit Man	(Australia) Ezekiel Gentle

=== Administration ===
- Owners Maverick Sports Partners
- Executive Director Maurice Bisetto
- Head of Football Operations Nigel Boogaard

=== Managers ===
- (Australia) Ian Crook (2001–2004)
- (England) Richard Money (1 January 2005 – 31 December 2005)
- (Australia) Nick Theodorakopoulos (2006)
- (Australia) Gary van Egmond (2006–2009)
- (Australia) Branko Culina (1 January 2009 – 4 October 2011)
- (Australia) Craig Deans (3 October 2011 – 20 October 2011)
- (Australia) Gary van Egmond (20 October 2011 – 20 January 2014)
- (Australia) Clayton Zane (20 January 2014 – 5 May 2014)
- (Australia) Phil Stubbins (5 May 2014 – 26 May 2015)
- (Australia) Scott Miller (18 June 2015 – 7 September 2016)
- (Australia) Mark Jones (23 September 2016 – 16 April 2017)
- (Scotland) Ernie Merrick (9 May 2017 – 6 January 2020
- (Australia) Craig Deans and (China) Qiang Li (6 January 2020 – 6 February 2020)
- (Wales) Carl Robinson (6 February 2020 – 15 October 2020)
- (Australia) Craig Deans (15 October 2020 – 10 February 2021)
- (Australia) Craig Deans (10 February 2021 – 10 June 2021)
- (Australia) Arthur Papas (28 June 2021– 19 June 2023)
- (Australia) Robert Stanton (26 June 2023 – 6 May 2025)
- (Australia) Mark Milligan (6 May 2025 – present)

== Club captains ==
Dates	Name	Notes	Honours (as captain)
2005–2006	(Australia) Ned Zelic	Inaugural club captain	
2006–2007	(Australia) Paul Okon		
2007–2009	(Australia) Jade North		2007–08 A-League Championship
2009–2010	(Australia) Matt Thompson		
2010–2011	(England) Michael Bridges	First foreign captain	
2011–2013	(Australia) Jobe Wheelhouse		
2013–2014	(Australia) Ruben Zadkovich		
2014–2015	(Netherlands) Kew Jaliens		
2015	(Australia) Taylor Regan		
2015–2021	(Australia) Nigel Boogaard	Longest serving captain	
2021–2023	(Australia) Matthew Jurman	Sole captain in 2021–22 season, co-captain in 2022–23	
2022–2023	(England) Carl Jenkinson	Co-captain in 2022–23	
2022–2024	(Australia) Brandon O'Neill	Co-captain in 2022–23, sole captain from 2023 to 2024	
2024–2026	(Australia) Kosta Grozos	Youngest club captain, most trophies won	2025 Australia Cup Winners 2025–26 A-League Men Premiers
2026–	(Australia) Max Burgess		

== Season by season record ==
Season	Division	League										FFA/Australia Cup	ACL	Top Goalscorer	
Season	Division	P	W	D	L	F	A	GD	Pts	Pos	Finals	FFA/Australia Cup	ACL	Name	Goals
2000–01	1st (NSL)	30	7	9	14	37	56	–19	30	14th	—	—	—	(Australia) John Buonavoglia	7
2001–02	1st (NSL)	24	10	12	2	33	21	+12	42	2nd	3rd	—	—	(Australia) Joel Griffiths	9
2002–03	1st (NSL)	24	10	7	7	37	25	+12	37	4th	6th	—	—	(Australia) Joel Griffiths	15
2003–04	1st (NSL)	24	6	6	12	18	33	–15	24	11th	—	—	—	(Australia) Jobe Wheelhouse	4
2005–06	1st (A-League)	21	9	4	8	27	29	–2	31	4th	4th	—	—	(Australia) Ante Milicic	7
2006–07	1st (A-League)	21	8	6	7	32	30	+2	30	3rd	3rd	—	—	(Australia) Mark Bridge	8
2007–08	1st (A-League)	21	9	7	5	25	21	+4	34	2nd	W	—	—	(Australia) Joel Griffiths	14
2008–09	1st (A-League)	21	4	6	11	21	39	–18	18	8th	—	—	Round of 16	(Australia) Joel Griffiths	7
2009–10	1st (A-League)	27	10	4	13	33	45	–12	34	6th	4th	—	—	(Australia) Matt Thompson, (England) Michael Bridges	6
2010–11	1st (A-League)	30	9	8	13	29	33	–4	35	7th	—	—	—	(Australia) Sasho Petrovski	5
2011–12	1st (A-League)	27	10	5	12	38	41	–3	35	7th	—	—	—	(Australia) Ryan Griffiths, (New Zealand) Jeremy Brockie	9
2012–13	1st (A-League)	27	8	7	12	30	45	–15	31	8th	—	—	—	(Australia) Ryan Griffiths, (England) Emile Heskey	9
2013–14	1st (A-League)	27	10	6	11	34	34	0	36	7th	—	—	—	(Australia) Adam Taggart	16
2014–15	1st (A-League)	27	3	8	16	23	55	–32	17	10th	—	Round of 32	—	(Ecuador) Edson Montaño	6
2015–16	1st (A-League)	27	8	6	13	28	41	–13	30	8th	—	Round of 32	—	(Serbia) Miloš Trifunović	9
2016–17	1st (A-League)	27	5	7	15	28	53	–25	22	10th	—	Round of 32	—	(Australia) Andrew Nabbout	8
2017–18	1st (A-League)	27	15	5	7	57	37	+20	50	2nd	2nd	Round of 32	—	(Australia) Andrew Nabbout, (Australia) Dimitri Petratos	10
2018–19	1st (A-League)	27	10	5	12	40	36	+4	35	7th	—	Round of 16	Play-off round	(Republic of Ireland) Roy O'Donovan	10
2019–20	1st (A-League)	26	9	7	10	32	40	–8	34	8th	—	Quarter-final	—	(Australia) Dimitri Petratos	7
2020–21	1st (A-League)	26	5	6	15	24	38	–14	21	11th	—	—	—	(Republic of Ireland) Roy O'Donovan	7
2021–22	1st (A-League)	26	8	5	13	45	43	+2	29	9th	—	Play-off round	—	(Georgia (country)) Beka Mikeltadze	13
2022–23	1st (A-League)	26	8	5	13	30	45	–15	29	10th	—	Round of 32	—	(Georgia (country)) Beka Mikeltadze	6
2023–24	1st (A-League)	27	6	10	11	39	47	–8	28	10th	—	Round of 32	—	(Australia) Apostolos Stamatelopoulos	17
2024–25	1st (A-League)	26	8	6	12	43	44	–1	30	9th	—	Round of 16	—	(Australia) Eli Adams	9
2025–26	1st (A-League)	26	15	3	8	55	39	+16	48	1st	SF	W	—	(Australia) Eli Adams	11
Season	Division	P	W	D	L	F	A	GD	Pts	Pos	Finals	FFA/Australia Cup	ACL	Name	Goals
Season	Division	League										FFA/Australia Cup	ACL	Top scorer	

Champions	Runners-up	Third Place

=== Continental ===
AFC Champions League
Season	Round	Date	Result	Team	Venue
2009 AFC Champions League	Group stage	10 March	0–2	(China) Beijing Guoan	Beijing, China
2009 AFC Champions League	Group stage	17 March	2–0	(South Korea) Ulsan Hyundai	Newcastle, New South Wales, Australia
2009 AFC Champions League	Group stage	7 April	1–1	(Japan) Nagoya Grampus	Nagoya, Aichi, Japan
2009 AFC Champions League	Group stage	22 April	0–1	Nagoya Grampus	Newcastle, New South Wales, Australia
2009 AFC Champions League	Group stage	6 May	2–1	Beijing Guoan	Newcastle, New South Wales, Australia
2009 AFC Champions League	Group stage	20 May	1–0	Ulsan Hyundai	Ulsan, South Korea
2009 AFC Champions League	Round of 16	24 June	0–6	(South Korea) Pohang Steelers	Pohang, South Korea
2019 AFC Champions League	Preliminary round 2	12 February	3–1	(Indonesia) Persija Jakarta	Newcastle, New South Wales, Australia
2019 AFC Champions League	Play-off	19 February	1–4	(Japan) Kashima Antlers	Kashima, Ibaraki, Japan
2026–27 AFC Champions League Elite	League Stage	15 September	1–7	(Japan) Kashima Antlers	Kashima, Ibaraki, Japan
2026–27 AFC Champions League Elite	League Stage	13 October	1–3	(Japan) Gamba Osaka	Newcastle, New South Wales, Australia
2026–27 AFC Champions League Elite	League Stage	27 October	2–5	(Japan) Kyoto Sanga FC	Kameoka, Kyoto, Japan
2026–27 AFC Champions League Elite	League Stage	3 November	2–4	(China) Shanghai Port F.C	Newcastle, New South Wales, Australia
2026–27 AFC Champions League Elite	League Stage	24 November		(Japan) Kashiwa Reysol	Central Coast, New South Wales, Australia
2026–27 AFC Champions League Elite	League Stage	1 December		(Japan) Vissel Kobe	Kobe, Hyōgo, Japan
2026–27 AFC Champions League Elite	League Stage	9 February		(Malaysia) Johor Darul Ta'zim	Newcastle, New South Wales, Australia
2026–27 AFC Champions League Elite	League Stage	16 February		(China) Beijing Guoan	Beijing, China

== Honours ==
=== Domestic ===
- A-League Men Championship
  - Winners (1): 2008
  - Runners-up (1): 2018
- A-League Men Premiership
  - Winners (1): 2025–26
  - Runners-up (2): 2007–08, 2017–18
- Australia Cup
  - Winners (1): 2025

== Emerging Jets Academy ==
The Emerging Jets program is underpinned by a tri-party agreement between the National Body (Football Federation Australia), the Member Federation (Northern New South Wales Football Federation) and the local A-League club (Newcastle Jets). The integrated talented player pathway by provides a development program for players from as young as eight years to the National Youth League, A-League and W-League.

In January 2015 the Emerging Jets Program moved to the Lake Macquarie Regional Football Facility. For the first time since its inauguration the Emerging Jets have a home base for their training and fixtures. The Lake Macquarie Regional Football Facility has also been the home of Northern NSW Football since late 2014.

The program is designed to provide players with the opportunity to develop their skills through access to quality coaching, competitive opportunities and support services. It aims to provide identified players and coaches with the opportunity to reach their full potential.

== See also ==
- Newcastle Jets FC W-League
- Newcastle Jets FC Youth
