= A-League Men transfers for 2022–23 season =

This is a list of Australian soccer transfers for the 2022–23 A-League Men. Only moves featuring at least one A-League Men club are listed.

Clubs were able to sign players at any time, but many transfers will only officially go through on 1 June because the majority of player contracts finish on 31 May.

== Transfers ==
All players without a flag are Australian. Clubs without a flag are clubs participating in the A-League Men.

=== Pre-season ===
| Date | Name | Moving from | Moving to |
|---|---|---|---|
| 17 February 2022 | Connor Metcalfe | Melbourne City | (Germany) FC St. Pauli |
| 25 March 2022 | (England) Gary Hooper | Wellington Phoenix | Unattached |
| 21 April 2022 | (Republic of Ireland) Andy Keogh | Perth Glory | Retired |
| 3 May 2022 | (Brazil) Bobô | Sydney FC | Retired |
| 5 May 2022 | Joshua Rawlins | Perth Glory | (Netherlands) Utrecht |
| 14 May 2022 | Phillip Cancar | Western Sydney Wanderers | (Scotland) Livingston |
| 14 May 2022 | Bernie Ibini | Western Sydney Wanderers | Unattached |
| 14 May 2022 | Dimitri Petratos | Western Sydney Wanderers | (Saudi Arabia) Al Wehda (end of loan) |
| 14 May 2022 | (Israel) Tomer Hemed | Western Sydney Wanderers | Unattached |
| 14 May 2022 | (Spain) Tomás Mejías | Western Sydney Wanderers | Unattached |
| 14 May 2022 | (Scotland) Ziggy Gordon | Western Sydney Wanderers | Unattached |
| 14 May 2022 | (Japan) Keijiro Ogawa | Western Sydney Wanderers | (Japan) Yokohama FC (end of loan) |
| 16 May 2022 | Michael Zullo | Sydney FC | Unattached |
| 16 May 2022 | Liam Rose | Macarthur FC | (United States) El Paso Locomotive |
| 17 May 2022 | Nicholas Olsen | Brisbane Roar | Unattached |
| 17 May 2022 | (Japan) Ryo Wada | Brisbane Roar | (Japan) Sagan Tosu (end of loan) |
| 19 May 2022 | (Netherlands) Luciano Narsingh | Sydney FC | Unattached |
| 19 May 2022 | Liam McGing | Sydney FC | Unattached |
| 19 May 2022 | Chris Zuvela | Sydney FC | Unattached |
| 20 May 2022 | (New Zealand) Louis Fenton | Wellington Phoenix | Retired |
| 20 May 2022 | Dylan Murnane | Newcastle Jets | Unattached |
| 20 May 2022 | Taylor Regan | Newcastle Jets | Unattached |
| 20 May 2022 | Jordan O'Doherty | Newcastle Jets | Unattached |
| 20 May 2022 | (South Sudan) Valentino Yuel | Newcastle Jets | Unattached |
| 20 May 2022 | (Cameroon) Olivier Boumal | Newcastle Jets | Unattached |
| 20 May 2022 | (Greece) Savvas Siatravanis | Newcastle Jets | Unattached |
| 20 May 2022 | (Spain) Mario Arqués | Newcastle Jets | Unattached |
| 23 May 2022 | (Mexico) Gael Sandoval | Wellington Phoenix | (Mexico) Guadalajara (end of loan) |
| 23 May 2022 | (North Macedonia) Matthew Bozinovski | Wellington Phoenix | Melbourne Victory (end of loan) |
| 23 May 2022 | (New Zealand) Kurtis Mogg | Wellington Phoenix | Unattached |
| 23 May 2022 | (New Zealand) George Ott | Wellington Phoenix | Unattached |
| 24 May 2022 | Callum Talbot | Sydney FC | Melbourne City |
| 25 May 2022 | Aaron Anderson | Melbourne Victory | Unattached |
| 25 May 2022 | Luis Lawrie-Lattanzio | Melbourne Victory | Unattached |
| 27 May 2022 | Eli Babalj | Newcastle Jets | Unattached |
| 27 May 2022 | Ben Kantarovski | Newcastle Jets | Unattached |
| 30 May 2022 | Lawrence Thomas | (Denmark) SønderjyskE | Western Sydney Wanderers |
| 31 May 2022 | Joe Caletti | Adelaide United | Unattached |
| 2 June 2022 | Zac Sapsford | Sydney FC Youth | Western Sydney Wanderers |
| 3 June 2022 | Nick Fitzgerald | Perth Glory | Unattached |
| 3 June 2022 | Osama Malik | Perth Glory | Unattached |
| 3 June 2022 | (Serbia) Darko Stanojević | Perth Glory | Unattached |
| 3 June 2022 | (England) Daniel Sturridge | Perth Glory | Unattached |
| 3 June 2022 | Steven Ugarkovic | Western Sydney Wanderers | Wellington Phoenix |
| 3 June 2022 | Mohamed Toure | Adelaide United | (France) Reims |
| 3 June 2022 | Yaya Dukuly | Adelaide United | (France) Reims |
| 4 June 2022 | (France) Romain Amalfitano | Unattached | Western Sydney Wanderers |
| 5 June 2022 | Kusini Yengi | Adelaide United | Western Sydney Wanderers |
| 6 June 2022 | (Germany) Nicolai Müller | Central Coast Mariners | Unattached |
| 6 June 2022 | Lewis Miller | Central Coast Mariners | Macarthur FC |
| 6 June 2022 | Calem Nieuwenhof | Sydney FC | Western Sydney Wanderers |
| 7 June 2022 | (Denmark) Michael Jakobsen | Adelaide United | Unattached |
| 7 June 2022 | (North Macedonia) Stefan Colakovski | Melbourne City | Perth Glory |
| 7 June 2022 | (England) Carl Jenkinson | Melbourne City | (England) Nottingham Forest (end of loan) |
| 7 June 2022 | (Japan) Tsubasa Endoh | Melbourne City | Unattached |
| 7 June 2022 | Anthony Lesiotis | Melbourne City | Unattached |
| 8 June 2022 | Matt Hatch | Central Coast Mariners | Perth Glory |
| 8 June 2022 | Robbie Kruse | Melbourne Victory | Unattached |
| 8 June 2022 | Brandon Wilson | Newcastle Jets | Unattached |
| 8 June 2022 | Samuel Silvera | Newcastle Jets | (Portugal) Paços de Ferreira (end of loan) |
| 8 June 2022 | Riley Warland | Newcastle Jets | Unattached |
| 8 June 2022 | Harry Van Der Saag | Sydney FC | Adelaide United |
| 9 June 2022 | (New Zealand) Keegan Jelacic | (Australia) Olympic FC | Perth Glory |
| 9 June 2022 | Thomas Aquilina | Western Sydney Wanderers | Central Coast Mariners |
| 9 June 2022 | Michael Ruhs | Macarthur FC | Central Coast Mariners |
| 9 June 2022 | Kye Rowles | Central Coast Mariners | (Scotland) Heart of Midlothian |
| 9 June 2022 | Aidan Simmons | Sydney FC Youth | Western Sydney Wanderers |
| 9 June 2022 | Lewis Miller | Macarthur FC | (Scotland) Hibernian |
| 10 June 2022 | Noah Smith | Central Coast Mariners | Melbourne Victory |
| 10 June 2022 | George Timotheou | Adelaide United | Melbourne Victory |
| 10 June 2022 | (Slovenia) Rene Krhin | Western United | Unattached |
| 10 June 2022 | Mustafa Amini | Sydney FC | Perth Glory |
| 10 June 2022 | Nathaneal Blair | (Australia) APIA Leichhardt | Western Sydney Wanderers |
| 11 June 2022 | Brandon O'Neill | Perth Glory | Newcastle Jets |
| 15 June 2022 | Jed Drew | (Australia) Northbridge Bulls | Macarthur FC |
| 16 June 2022 | Ryan Williams | (England) Oxford United | Perth Glory |
| 16 June 2022 | Tass Mourdoukoutas | Western Sydney Wanderers | (Canada) York United |
| 17 June 2022 | Eddie Caspers | (Australia) Northbridge Bulls | Macarthur FC |
| 17 June 2022 | Apostolos Giannou | Macarthur FC | Unattached |
| 17 June 2022 | Antony Golec | Macarthur FC | Unattached |
| 17 June 2022 | Aleksandar Jovanovic | Macarthur FC | Unattached |
| 17 June 2022 | (England) Jordon Mutch | Macarthur FC | Unattached |
| 19 June 2022 | Oliver Bozanic | Central Coast Mariners | Western Sydney Wanderers |
| 20 June 2022 | Gabriel Cleur | (Italy) Virtus Entella | Western Sydney Wanderers |
| 21 June 2022 | (New Zealand) Kosta Barbarouses | Sydney FC | Wellington Phoenix |
| 21 June 2022 | Reno Piscopo | Wellington Phoenix | Newcastle Jets |
| 22 June 2022 | (England) Mark Beevers | (England) Peterborough United | Perth Glory |
| 22 June 2022 | Samuel Silvera | (Portugal) Paços de Ferreira | Central Coast Mariners |
| 22 June 2022 | Jason Davidson | Melbourne Victory | (Belgium) Eupen |
| 22 June 2022 | (Netherlands) Richard van der Venne | Unattached | Melbourne City |
| 22 June 2022 | Brendan Hamill | Melbourne Victory | (India) ATK Mohun Bagan |
| 23 June 2022 | (Democratic Republic of the Congo) Yeni Ngbakoto | Unattached | Western Sydney Wanderers |
| 23 June 2022 | (Italy) Francesco Margiotta | Melbourne Victory | Unattached |
| 23 June 2022 | (Brazil) Daniel Penha | Newcastle Jets | (Brazil) Atlético Mineiro (end of loan) |
| 24 June 2022 | Trent Buhagiar | Sydney FC | Newcastle Jets |
| 25 June 2022 | Daniel Walsh | Perth Glory | (Australia) Gwelup Croatia |
| 27 June 2022 | (England) Charlie Austin | (England) Queens Park Rangers | Brisbane Roar |
| 27 June 2022 | Ben Warland | Sydney FC | Adelaide United |
| 27 June 2022 | Jaushua Sotirio | Wellington Phoenix | Newcastle Jets |
| 27 June 2022 | Tomi Juric | Macarthur FC | Melbourne Victory |
| 27 June 2022 | Keanu Baccus | Western Sydney Wanderers | (Scotland) St Mirren |
| 28 June 2022 | Ahmad Taleb | Melbourne City | Melbourne Victory |
| 28 June 2022 | Eli Adams | Brisbane Roar Youth | Melbourne Victory |
| 28 June 2022 | Rory Jordan | (Australia) Northbridge Bulls | Newcastle Jets |
| 30 June 2022 | Lucas Mauragis | Newcastle Jets | Wellington Phoenix (loan) |
| 1 July 2022 | Tom Beadling | (England) Barrow | Western Sydney Wanderers |
| 1 July 2022 | Vedran Janjetovic | Western Sydney Wanderers | Unattached |
| 1 July 2022 | Jordi Swibel | Western Sydney Wanderers | Unattached |
| 2 July 2022 | (Italy) Manuel Pucciarelli | Melbourne City | Unattached |
| 3 July 2022 | (Ghana) Paul Ayongo | (Portugal) Académico de Viseu | Central Coast Mariners |
| 3 July 2022 | (Serbia) Miloš Ninković | Sydney FC | Western Sydney Wanderers |
| 4 July 2022 | Mark Natta | Western Sydney Wanderers | Newcastle Jets |
| 4 July 2022 | (Israel) Ben Azubel | (Israel) Hapoel Ra'anana | Perth Glory |
| 4 July 2022 | Jerry Skotadis | Western United | Macarthur FC |
| 5 July 2022 | (New Zealand) James McGarry | Wellington Phoenix | Newcastle Jets |
| 5 July 2022 | Jonathan Aspropotamitis | Perth Glory | Macarthur FC |
| 5 July 2022 | Alexander Robinson | (Australia) Blacktown City | Macarthur FC |
| 6 July 2022 | Kearyn Baccus | Unattached | Macarthur FC |
| 7 July 2022 | (Japan) Kosuke Ota | Perth Glory | Unattached |
| 7 July 2022 | Anthony Carter | (Thailand) Bangkok United | Macarthur FC |
| 7 July 2022 | Matthew Millar | (Scotland) St Mirren | Macarthur FC |
| 8 July 2022 | Ivan Vujica | Western United | Macarthur FC |
| 8 July 2022 | (Croatia) Ivan Kelava | Melbourne Victory | Unattached |
| 8 July 2022 | Paul Izzo | Unattached | Melbourne Victory |
| 9 July 2022 | (Argentina) Juan Lescano | Brisbane Roar | Unattached |
| 9 July 2022 | (Japan) Riku Danzaki | (Japan) Consadole Sapporo | Brisbane Roar (loan) |
| 10 July 2022 | Rostyn Griffiths | Melbourne City | (India) Mumbai City |
| 11 July 2022 | (New Zealand) Marco Rojas | Melbourne Victory | (Chile) Colo-Colo |
| 12 July 2022 | (Portugal) Nani | (Italy) Venezia | Melbourne Victory |
| 13 July 2022 | (Spain) Diego Caballo | Unattached | Sydney FC |
| 17 July 2022 | James Troisi | Western Sydney Wanderers | Western United |
| 19 July 2022 | (Republic of Ireland) Aaron McEneff | (Scotland) Heart of Midlothian | Perth Glory |
| 19 July 2022 | Mark Birighitti | Central Coast Mariners | (Scotland) Dundee United |
| 19 July 2022 | Tommy Oar | Macarthur FC | Retired |
| 20 July 2022 | James Meredith | Macarthur FC | Retired |
| 21 July 2022 | (Costa Rica) Marco Ureña | Central Coast Mariners | Unattached |
| 22 July 2022 | (Spain) Cadete | Unattached | Melbourne Victory |
| 22 July 2022 | (Bulgaria) Bozhidar Kraev | (Denmark) Midtjylland | Wellington Phoenix |
| 22 July 2022 | Ruon Tongyik | Central Coast Mariners | Western Sydney Wanderers |
| 22 July 2022 | Lachlan Brook | Adelaide United | (England) Brentford (end of loan) |
| 23 July 2022 | (Burundi) Elvis Kamsoba | Sydney FC | (Iran) Sepahan |
| 24 July 2022 | (Bosnia and Herzegovina) Sulejman Krpić | Unattached | Western Sydney Wanderers |
| 26 July 2022 | Brandon Borrello | (Germany) Dynamo Dresden | Western Sydney Wanderers |
| 26 July 2022 | Daniel Arzani | (England) Manchester City | Macarthur FC |
| 26 July 2022 | Nectarios Triantis | Western Sydney Wanderers | Central Coast Mariners |
| 26 July 2022 | (Japan) Cy Goddard | Central Coast Mariners | (United States) Detroit City |
| 29 July 2022 | John Koutroumbis | Western Sydney Wanderers | Perth Glory |
| 31 July 2022 | (Brazil) Marcelo | Unattached | Western Sydney Wanderers |
| 3 August 2022 | (England) Carl Jenkinson | Unattached | Newcastle Jets |
| 3 August 2022 | Ben Halloran | Unattached | Adelaide United |
| 4 August 2022 | Daniel Stynes | Perth Glory | Newcastle Jets |
| 4 August 2022 | Callum Timmins | Perth Glory | Newcastle Jets |
| 5 August 2022 | Danny Vukovic | (Netherlands) NEC | Central Coast Mariners |
| 9 August 2022 | (Slovakia) Róbert Mak | Unattached | Sydney FC |
| 10 August 2022 | Alex Parsons | Brisbane Roar | Sydney FC |
| 12 August 2022 | (England) Jack Rodwell | Western Sydney Wanderers | Sydney FC |
| 13 August 2022 | (Brazil) Yan Sasse | (Brazil) América Mineiro | Wellington Phoenix |
| 15 August 2022 | (England) Joe Lolley | (England) Nottingham Forest | Sydney FC |
| 16 August 2022 | (Nigeria) Kelechi John | Unattached | Central Coast Mariners |
| 16 August 2022 | (Finland) Thomas Lam | Unattached | Melbourne City |
| 18 August 2022 | Corey Brown | Brisbane Roar | Unattached |
| 22 August 2022 | Jacob Tratt | Adelaide United | Western United |
| 23 August 2022 | Noah James | (Australia) Dandenong Thunder | Newcastle Jets (end of loan) |
| 24 August 2022 | (Mali) Tongo Doumbia | Unattached | Western United |
| 25 August 2022 | David Williams | Unattached | Perth Glory |
| 30 August 2022 | (Georgia (country)) Beka Dartsmelia | (Georgia (country)) Locomotive Tbilisi | Newcastle Jets |
| 30 August 2022 | (Poland) Oskar Zawada | Unattached | Wellington Phoenix |
| 30 August 2022 | (Jamaica) Adrian Mariappa | Macarthur FC | Unattached |
| 1 September 2022 | (Georgia (country)) Bachana Arabuli | Unattached | Macarthur FC |
| 6 September 2022 | Zach Duncan | (Denmark) AGF | Perth Glory (loan) |
| 7 September 2022 | Jacob Dowse | (Australia) Broadmeadow Magic | Perth Glory |
| 7 September 2022 | (Kosovo) Valon Berisha | (France) Reims | Melbourne City (loan) |
| 14 September 2022 | Luke Ivanovic | Brisbane Roar | Perth Glory |
| 14 September 2022 | Carlo Armiento | Perth Glory | Brisbane Roar |
| 14 September 2022 | Nathan Konstandopoulos | Adelaide United | Melbourne Victory |
| 14 September 2022 | Birkan Kirdar | Melbourne Victory | Unattached |
| 14 September 2022 | Zaydan Bello | Melbourne Victory | Unattached |
| 15 September 2022 | (Tunisia) Salim Khelifi | Unattached | Perth Glory |
| 16 September 2022 | (Barbados) Mario Williams | (Barbados) Weymouth Wales | Macarthur FC |
| 16 September 2022 | Joe Knowles | (Australia) Oakleigh Cannons | Brisbane Roar |
| 16 September 2022 | Jordan Courtney-Perkins | (Poland) Raków Częstochowa | Brisbane Roar (loan) |
| 19 September 2022 | (Brazil) Marco Túlio | (Portugal) Sporting CP B | Central Coast Mariners |
| 27 September 2022 | (Vanuatu) Brian Kaltak | Unattached | Central Coast Mariners |
| 3 October 2022 | Matt Simon | Central Coast Mariners | Retired |
| 5 October 2022 | Pierce Clark | Unattached | Perth Glory |
| 15 November 2022 | Ciaran Bramwell | Perth Glory | (Australia) Melbourne Knights |

=== Mid-season ===
| Date | Name | Moving from | Moving to |
|---|---|---|---|
| 20 October 2022 | Joshua Mori | (Australia) Beograd | Adelaide United |
| 31 October 2022 | Bruno Fornaroli | Perth Glory | Melbourne Victory |
| 4 November 2022 | Adrian Vlastelica | (Australia) Sydney United 58 | Sydney FC |
| 9 November 2022 | Isaac Hovar | (Australia) Northbridge Bulls | Macarthur FC |
| 9 November 2022 | Oliver Jones | (Australia) Northbridge Bulls | Macarthur FC |
| 2 December 2022 | (Barbados) Mario Williams | Macarthur FC | Unattached |
| 8 December 2022 | Joshua Mori | Adelaide United | Unattached |
| 14 December 2022 | (England) Charlie Austin | Brisbane Roar | Unattached |
| 15 December 2022 | Jesse Daley | Brisbane Roar | (Canada) Cavalry FC |
| 15 December 2022 | Adam Taggart | (Japan) Cerezo Osaka | Perth Glory |
| 15 December 2022 | (Burundi) Pacifique Niyongabire | Perth Glory | (Canada) Valour FC |
| 24 December 2022 | (Israel) Ben Azubel | Perth Glory | (Thailand) BG Pathum United |
| 27 December 2022 | (Germany) Matti Steinmann | Brisbane Roar | Unattached |
| 30 December 2022 | (New Zealand) Ben Waine | Wellington Phoenix | (England) Plymouth Argyle |
| 1 January 2023 | Garang Kuol | Central Coast Mariners | (England) Newcastle United |
| 17 January 2023 | Christian Theoharous | Western United | Central Coast Mariners |
| 17 January 2023 | Cyrus Dehmie | Brisbane Roar | (Denmark) Næstved Boldklub |
| 20 January 2023 | Dalibor Markovic | Western United | Unattached |
| 20 January 2023 | (Austria) Marcel Canadi | (Croatia) Šibenik | Brisbane Roar |
| 21 January 2023 | Nicholas D'Agostino | Melbourne Victory | (Norway) Viking FK |
| 21 January 2023 | Anthony Carter | Macarthur FC | (Portugal) Oliveirense |
| 21 January 2023 | Jordan Elsey | Newcastle Jets | Perth Glory |
| 21 January 2023 | Rory Jordan | Newcastle Jets | (Australia) APIA Leichhardt (loan) |
| 25 January 2023 | (Japan) Manabu Saitō | Unattached | Newcastle Jets |
| 27 January 2023 | Ruon Tongyik | Western Sydney Wanderers | (Iran) Mes Kerman (loan) |
| 28 January 2023 | (France) Morgan Schneiderlin | (France) Nice | Western Sydney Wanderers (loan) |
| 28 January 2023 | (Japan) Riku Danzaki | Brisbane Roar | (Japan) Consadole Sapporo (end of loan) |
| 29 January 2023 | (Bosnia and Herzegovina) Sulejman Krpić | Western Sydney Wanderers | (Bosnia and Herzegovina) Željezničar |
| 29 January 2023 | Dylan Wenzel-Halls | Western United | Central Coast Mariners |
| 1 February 2023 | (Nigeria) Kelechi John | Central Coast Mariners | (Portugal) Belenenses SAD |
| 1 February 2023 | Taras Gomulka | Melbourne City | Brisbane Roar |
| 1 February 2023 | Bruce Kamau | (Greece) OFI Crete | Melbourne Victory (loan) |
| 1 February 2023 | Joel King | (Denmark) OB | Sydney FC (loan) |
| 2 February 2023 | Adrian Vlastelica | Sydney FC | (Australia) Sydney United 58 |
| 2 February 2023 | Matthew Spiranovic | Melbourne Victory | Retired |
| 2 February 2023 | Robbie Kruse | Unattached | Brisbane Roar |
| 2 February 2023 | Luka Prso | Melbourne Victory | (Austria) SV Stripfing |
| 5 February 2023 | Jakob Cresnar | Central Coast Mariners | (Australia) Sydney Olympic |
| 6 February 2023 | Michael Ruhs | Central Coast Mariners | Western United |
| 6 February 2023 | Connor O'Toole | Sydney FC | Western United |
| 6 February 2023 | (France) Damien Da Silva | (France) Lyon | Melbourne Victory |
| 7 February 2023 | (New Zealand) Nikko Boxall | (New Zealand) Auckland City | Wellington Phoenix |
| 7 February 2023 | Nicolas Milanovic | Western United | Western Sydney Wanderers |
| 7 February 2023 | Ramy Najjarine | Western Sydney Wanderers | Western United |
| 7 February 2023 | Anton Mlinaric | Brisbane Roar | Unattached |
| 7 February 2023 | Connor Chapman | Brisbane Roar | Melbourne Victory |
| 7 February 2023 | Noah Smith | Melbourne Victory | Brisbane Roar |
| 7 February 2023 | (Serbia) Stefan Šćepović | (Cyprus) AEL Limassol | Brisbane Roar |
| 8 February 2023 | (Paraguay) Fernando Romero | (Paraguay) Cerro Porteño | Melbourne Victory (loan) |
| 8 February 2023 | Phillip Cancar | (Scotland) Livingston | Newcastle Jets |
| 8 February 2023 | Thomas Aquilina | Central Coast Mariners | Newcastle Jets |
| 8 February 2023 | (New Zealand) James McGarry | Newcastle Jets | Central Coast Mariners |
| 8 February 2023 | Jay Barnett | Melbourne Victory | Adelaide United |
| 8 February 2023 | Luke Duzel | Western United | Adelaide United |
| 9 February 2023 | (Tunisia) Amor Layouni | (Norway) Vålerenga | Western Sydney Wanderers (loan) |
| 18 February 2023 | Patrick Yazbek | Sydney FC | (Norway) Viking FK |
| 24 February 2023 | Dor Jok | Central Coast Mariners | (Australia) Port Melbourne |
| 24 February 2023 | (United States) Jason Romero | (Australia) APIA Leichhardt | Macarthur FC |
| 27 March 2023 | (Georgia (country)) Beka Dartsmelia | Newcastle Jets | Unattached |
| 29 March 2023 | Liam Reddy | Perth Glory | Retired |

Player was released to free agency before joining new club
Following the conclusion of his loan, Jordan signed a contract extension with APIA Leichhardt, mutually terminating his contract with Newcastle Jets.
