= 2022–23 Newcastle Jets FC season =

Newcastle Jets
2022–23 season
- Chairman: Shane Mattiske
- Manager: Arthur Papas
- Stadium: McDonald Jones Stadium
- A-League Men: 10th
- A-League Men Finals: DNQ
- Australia Cup: Round of 32
- Top goalscorer: League: Beka Mikeltadze (6); All: Beka Mikeltadze (6)
- Highest home attendance: 9,271 vs. Central Coast Mariners (22 April 2023); A-League Men
- Lowest home attendance: 4,380 vs. Macarthur FC (14 April 2023); A-League Men
- Average home league attendance: 6,152
- Biggest win: 4–0 vs. Brisbane Roar (H) (27 January 2023); A-League Men
- Biggest defeat: 0–4 vs. Melbourne Victory (A) (4 November 2022)
Home colours	Away colours
- All statistics correct as of 29 April 2023.

The 2022–23 season was the 22nd in the history of Newcastle Jets Football Club and the club's 18th season in the A-League Men. In addition to the domestic league, Newcastle Jets also competed in the Australia Cup for the seventh time.

== Players ==
=== First-team squad ===
Note: Flags indicate national team as defined under FIFA eligibility rules; some limited exceptions apply. Players may hold more than one non-FIFA nationality.

No.	Pos.	Nation	Player
1	GK	AUS	Jack Duncan
2	DF	NZL	Dane Ingham
3	DF	AUS	Jason Hoffman
4	FW	JPN	Manabu Saitō
5	DF	AUS	Matthew Jurman (co-captain)
6	MF	AUS	Brandon O'Neill (co-captain)
7	FW	AUS	Trent Buhagiar
9	FW	GEO	Beka Mikeltadze
10	MF	AUS	Reno Piscopo
11	FW	AUS	Jaushua Sotirio
14	MF	AUS	Mohamed Al-Taay

No.	Pos.	Nation	Player
17	MF	AUS	Kosta Grozos
18	MF	AUS	Daniel Stynes
19	MF	AUS	Callum Timmins
20	GK	AUS	Michael Weier
22	DF	AUS	Phillip Cancar
25	DF	ENG	Carl Jenkinson (co-captain)
26	FW	AUS	Archie Goodwin
30	GK	AUS	Noah James
32	MF	AUS	Angus Thurgate
33	DF	AUS	Mark Natta
39	DF	AUS	Thomas Aquilina

== Transfers ==
=== Transfers in ===
No.	Position	Player	Transferred from	Type/fee	Contract length	Date	Ref
6	MF	Brandon O'Neill	Perth Glory	Free transfer	2 years	11 June 2022	
10	FW	Reno Piscopo	Unattached	Free transfer	2 years	21 June 2022	
7	FW	Trent Buhagiar	Unattached	Free transfer	2 years	24 June 2022	
11	FW	Jaushua Sotirio	Unattached	Free transfer	2 years	27 June 2022	
23	FW	Rory Jordan	(Australia) Northbridge Bulls	Free transfer	2 years	28 June 2022	
33	DF	Mark Natta	Unattached	Free transfer	2 years	4 July 2022	
24	DF	(New Zealand) James McGarry	Unattached	Free transfer	2 years	5 July 2022	
25	DF	(England) Carl Jenkinson	Unattached	Free transfer	2 years	3 August 2022	
18	MF	Daniel Stynes	Perth Glory	Free transfer	1 year	4 August 2022	
19	MF	Callum Timmins	Perth Glory	Free transfer	2 years	4 August 2022	
30	GK	Noah James	(Australia) Dandenong Thunder	End of loan	(1 year)	23 August 2022	
8	MF	(Georgia (country)) Beka Dartsmelia	(Georgia (country)) Locomotive Tbilisi	Free transfer	Multi-year	30 August 2022	
4	FW	(Japan) Manabu Saitō	Unattached	Free transfer	6 months	25 January 2023	
39	DF	Thomas Aquilina	Central Coast Mariners	Free transfer	1.5 years	8 February 2023	
22	DF	Phillip Cancar	(Scotland) Livingston	Free transfer	1.5 years	8 February 2023	

=== Transfers out ===
No.	Position	Player	Transferred to	Type/fee	Date	Ref.
7	MF	Jordan O'Doherty	Unattached	End of contract	20 May 2022	
8	MF	(Spain) Mario Arqués	Unattached	End of contract	20 May 2022	
10	FW	(Cameroon) Olivier Boumal	Unattached	End of contract	20 May 2022	
15	DF	Dylan Murnane	Unattached	End of contract	20 May 2022	
17	FW	(South Sudan) Valentino Yuel	Unattached	End of contract	20 May 2022	
19	DF	Taylor Regan	Unattached	End of contract	20 May 2022	
21	MF	(Greece) Savvas Siatravanis	Unattached	End of contract	20 May 2022	
5	MF	Ben Kantarovski	Unattached	End of contract	27 May 2022	
23	FW	Eli Babalj	Unattached	End of contract	27 May 2022	
13	MF	Brandon Wilson	Unattached	End of contract	8 June 2022	
25	MF	Samuel Silvera	(Portugal) Paços de Ferreira	End of loan	8 June 2022	
44	DF	Riley Warland	Unattached	Mutual contract termination	8 June 2022	
11	MF	(Brazil) Daniel Penha	(Brazil) Atlético Mineiro	End of loan	23 June 2022	
27	DF	Lucas Mauragis	Wellington Phoenix	Loan	30 June 2022	
4	DF	Jordan Elsey	Perth Glory	Mutual contract termination	21 January 2023	
23	FW	Rory Jordan	(Australia) APIA Leichhardt	Loan (Note: Following the conclusion of his loan, Jordan signed a contract extension with APIA Leichhardt, mutually terminating his contract with Newcastle Jets.)	21 January 2023	
24	DF	(New Zealand) James McGarry	Central Coast Mariners	Mutual contract termination	8 February 2023	
8	MF	(Georgia (country)) Beka Dartsmelia	Unattached	Mutual contract termination	27 March 2023	

=== Contract extensions ===
No.	Name	Position	Duration	Date	Notes
3	Jason Hoffman	Right-back	1 year	20 May 2022	
20	Michael Weier	Goalkeeper	2 years	20 May 2022	
14	Mohamed Al-Taay	Central midfielder	1 year	24 May 2022	
16	Kosta Grozos	Central midfielder	1 year	24 May 2022	
26	Archie Goodwin	Striker	3 years	25 May 2022	
27	Lucas Mauragis	Left-back	2 years	30 June 2022	New two-year contract signed, replacing previous contract which was until end of 2022–23.

== Pre-season and friendlies ==
6 August 2022	Sydney Olympic (Australia)	1–2	Newcastle Jets	Sydney
	O'Donovan ?'	Report	Sotirio; Jordan ?'	Stadium: WSW training facility

25 August 2022	Coastal Premier League All-Stars (Australia)	1–15	Newcastle Jets	Coffs Harbour
	? ?'	Report	Stynes 2', 16', 21'; Buhagiar 9'; Mikeltadze 10', 15', 17'; ? ?'; ? ?'; ? ?'; ? ?'; ? ?'; ? ?'; ? ?'; ? ?'	Stadium: Coffs Harbour International Stadium; Attendance: 2,000+

4 September 2022	Newcastle Jets	3–3	Wellington Phoenix	Sydney
	Piscopo ?'; Goodwin ?' (pen.); Hoffman ?'	CoY report Newcastle Herald report	van Hattum ?', ?'; Bidois ?'
Note: The match was played over three 45-minute periods

17 September 2022	Western Sydney Wanderers	0–0	Newcastle Jets	Blacktown
		Report		Stadium: Wanderers Football Park

29 September 2022	Newcastle Jets	1–0	Melbourne Victory	Newcastle
AEST	Dartsmelia	Report		Stadium: McDonald Jones Stadium

26 November 2022 Greater Bank Tour of Tamworth	Newcastle Jets	1–1	Melbourne City	Tamworth
17:30 AEDT	Mikeltadze 23'	Report	Berisha 69'	Stadium: Scully Park

== Competitions ==
=== Overall record ===
Competition	First match	Last match	Starting round	Final position	Record							
Competition	First match	Last match	Starting round	Final position	Pld	W	D	L	GF	GA	GD	Win %
A-League Men	15 October 2022	29 April 2023	Matchday 1	10th	26	8	5	13	30	45	−15	30.77
Australia Cup	30 July 2022		Round of 32	Round of 32	1	0	0	1	0	2	−2	0.00
Total					27	8	5	14	30	47	−17	29.63

Last updated: 29 April 2023
Source: Soccerway

=== A-League Men ===
==== League table ====
Pos	Team	Pld	W	D	L	GF	GA	GD	Pts	Qualification
8	Brisbane Roar	26	7	9	10	26	33	−7	30	
9	Perth Glory	26	7	8	11	36	46	−10	29	Qualification for 2023 Australia Cup play-offs
10	Newcastle Jets	26	8	5	13	30	45	−15	29	Qualification for 2023 Australia Cup play-offs
11	Melbourne Victory	26	8	4	14	29	34	−5	28	Qualification for 2023 Australia Cup play-offs
12	Macarthur FC	26	7	5	14	31	48	−17	26	Qualification for AFC Cup group stage and 2023 Australia Cup play-offs (Note: Qualified to the AFC Cup as the 2022 Australia Cup winners.)

Source: A-Leagues
Rules for classification: 1) Points; 2) Goal difference; 3) Goals scored; 4) Points per game; 5) Least red cards; 6) Least yellow cards; 7) Toss of a coin in an event of a tie of two clubs.

==== Results summary ====
Overall								Home						Away					
Pld	W	D	L	GF	GA	GD	Pts	W	D	L	GF	GA	GD	W	D	L	GF	GA	GD
26	8	5	13	30	45	−15	29	5	2	6	21	22	−1	3	3	7	9	23	−14

Last updated: 29 April 2023.
Source: Ultimate A-League

==== Results by round ====
Round	2	3	4	5	6	7	8	1	9	10	11	12	13	14	15	16	17	18	19	20	21	22	23	24	25	26
Ground	H	H	A	A	H	A	H	A	A	H	A	A	H	H	A	H	A	H	A	H	H	A	A	H	H	A
Result	W	W	L	L	L	W	L	L	W	L	L	D	D	W	D	W	W	L	L	L	D	D	L	W	L	L
Position	7	3	5	9	11	8	11	12	6	8	10	10	11	9	8	7	7	7	7	8	7	8	9	7	8	10
Points	3	6	6	6	6	9	9	9	12	12	12	13	14	17	18	21	24	24	24	24	25	26	26	29	29	29

Updated to match(es) played on 29 April 2023. Source: Ultimate A-League
A = Away; H = Home; W = Win; D = Draw; L = Loss

==== Matches ====
15 October 2022 2	Newcastle Jets	2–1	Perth Glory	Newcastle
17:00 AEDT	Elsey 59'; Mikeltadze 90+3'	Report	McEneff 73' (pen.)	Stadium: McDonald Jones Stadium; Attendance: 7,089; Referee: Daniel Elder

22 October 2022 3	Newcastle Jets	3–1	Wellington Phoenix	Newcastle
17:00 AEDT	McGarry 4'; Dartsmelia 16'; Buhagiar 44'	Report	Kraev 39'	Stadium: McDonald Jones Stadium; Attendance: 7,028; Referee: Jack Morgan

28 October 2022 4	Western Sydney Wanderers	2–0	Newcastle Jets	Sydney
19:45 AEDT	Amalfitano 44'; Borrello 51'	Report		Stadium: CommBank Stadium; Attendance: 9,641; Referee: Shaun Evans

4 November 2022 5	Melbourne Victory	4–0	Newcastle Jets	Melbourne
19:45 AEDT	Brimmer 16' (pen.); Ikonomidis 50'; D'Agostino 54'; Fornaroli 89' (pen.)	Report		Stadium: AAMI Park; Attendance: 13,052; Referee: Ben Abraham

12 November 2022 6	Newcastle Jets	1–2	Melbourne City	Newcastle
17:00 AEDT	Jamieson 38' (o.g.)	Report	van der Venne 20'; Maclaren 57'	Stadium: McDonald Jones Stadium; Attendance: 7,234; Referee: Jonathan Barreiro

11 December 2022 7	Central Coast Mariners	1–2	Newcastle Jets	Gosford
15:00 AEDT	Cummings 53'	Report	Buhagiar 12'; Mikeltadze 66'	Stadium: Central Coast Stadium; Attendance: 7,078; Referee: Ben Abraham

16 December 2022 8	Newcastle Jets	0–1	Brisbane Roar	Newcastle
19:45 AEDT		Report	Mileusnic 80'	Stadium: McDonald Jones Stadium; Attendance: 5,135; Referee: Kurt Ams

21 December 2022 1	Central Coast Mariners	3–0	Newcastle Jets	Gosford
19:00 AEDT	Túlio 22'; Cummings 63'; Nkololo 87' (pen.)	Report		Stadium: Central Coast Stadium; Attendance: 7,173; Referee: Lachlan Keevers

27 December 2022 9	Adelaide United	0–1	Newcastle Jets	Adelaide
19:15 AEDT		Report	Sotirio 25'	Stadium: Coopers Stadium; Attendance: 8,350; Referee: Ben Abraham

1 January 2023 10	Newcastle Jets	0–2	Sydney FC	Newcastle
15:00 AEDT		Report	Le Fondre 37'; Mak 41'	Stadium: McDonald Jones Stadium; Attendance: 8,041; Referee: Alireza Faghani

8 January 2023 11	Macarthur FC	2–0	Newcastle Jets	Campbelltown
15:00 AEDT	Toure 43'; Dávila 78'	Report		Stadium: Campbelltown Stadium; Attendance: 3,123; Referee: Adam Kersey

15 January 2023 12	Western United	1–1	Newcastle Jets	Ballarat
17:00 AEDT	Wales 13'	Report	Stynes 17'	Stadium: Mars Stadium; Attendance: 2,356; Referee: Kurt Ams

22 January 2023 13	Newcastle Jets	1–1	Western Sydney Wanderers	Newcastle
15:00 AEDT	Thurgate 37'	Report	Bozanic 64' (pen.)	Stadium: McDonald Jones Stadium; Attendance: 5,081; Referee: Daniel Elder

27 January 2023 14	Newcastle Jets	4–0	Brisbane Roar	Newcastle
19:45 AEDT	Sotirio 52'; Buhagiar 72'; Mikeltadze 76'; Goodwin 90+4'	Report		Stadium: McDonald Jones Stadium; Attendance: 5,235; Referee: Jonathon Barreiro

4 February 2023 15	Perth Glory	2–2	Newcastle Jets	Perth
22:00 AEDT	Bodnar 44'; Beevers 79'	Report	Piscopo 59'; Goodwin 88'	Stadium: Macedonia Park; Attendance: 3,858; Referee: Shaun Evans

12 February 2023 16	Newcastle Jets	2–1	Melbourne Victory	Newcastle
15:00 AEDT	Mikeltadze 37' (pen.); Grozos 58'	Report	Velupillay 51'	Stadium: McDonald Jones Stadium; Attendance: 5,595; Referee: Alex King

18 February 2023 17	Macarthur FC	0–1	Newcastle Jets	Campbelltown
17:00 AEDT		Report	Buhagiar 8'	Stadium: Campbelltown Stadium; Attendance: 2,223; Referee: Stephen Lucas

25 February 2023 18	Newcastle Jets	1–3	Western United	Newcastle
17:00 AEDT	Mikeltadze 33' (pen.)	Report	Botic 3', 29'; Doumbia 72'	Stadium: McDonald Jones Stadium; Attendance: 6,190; Referee: Ben Abraham

4 March 2023 19	Wellington Phoenix	2–1	Newcastle Jets	Wellington
15:00 AEDT	Elliot 40'; Zawada 45+6' (pen.)	Report	Saito 51'	Stadium: Sky Stadium; Attendance: 6,388; Referee: Shaun Evans

11 March 2023 20	Newcastle Jets	2–4	Adelaide United	Newcastle
19:45 AEDT	Hoffman 16'; Thurgate 45+3'	Report	Goodwin 12'; Clough 14'; Jovanovic 44'; Irankunda 65'	Stadium: McDonald Jones Stadium; Attendance: 4,839; Referee: Daniel Elder

18 March 2023 21	Newcastle Jets	2–2	Perth Glory	Newcastle
17:00 AEDT	Buhagiar 36'; Grozos 79'	Report	McEneff 52'; R. Williams 90+7'	Stadium: McDonald Jones Stadium; Attendance: 4,864; Referee: Adam Bavcar

2 April 2023 22	Melbourne City	1–1	Newcastle Jets	Melbourne
15:00 AEST	Caputo 90+2'	Report	Mikeltadze 31' (pen.)	Stadium: AAMI Park; Attendance: 4,088; Referee: Jack Morgan

8 April 2023 23	Brisbane Roar	3–0	Newcastle Jets	Brisbane
17:00 AEST	Hore 35'; O'Shea 70'; Šćepović 90+3'	Report		Stadium: Kayo Stadium; Attendance: 3,911; Referee: Shane Skinner

14 April 2023 24	Newcastle Jets	2–1	Macarthur FC	Newcastle
19:45 AEST	Jurman 79'; O'Neill 90+5'	Report	Arabuli 90+2'	Stadium: McDonald Jones Stadium; Attendance: 4,380; Referee: Lachlan Keevers

22 April 2023 25	Newcastle Jets	1–3	Central Coast Mariners	Newcastle
17:00 AEST	Sotirio 9'	Report	Silvera 28', 58'; Túlio 69'	Stadium: McDonald Jones Stadium; Attendance: 9,271; Referee: Shaun Evans

29 April 2023 26	Sydney FC	2–0	Newcastle Jets	Sydney
17:00 AEST	Le Fondre 29'; Wood 63'	Report		Stadium: Allianz Stadium; Attendance: 12,541; Referee: Alex King

=== Australia Cup ===
30 July 2022 Round of 32	Newcastle Jets	0–2	Adelaide United	Newcastle
19:30 AEDT		Report	Blackwood 45'; Ibusuki 79'	Stadium: McDonald Jones Stadium; Attendance: 4,439; Referee: Kurt Ams

== Statistics ==
=== Appearances and goals ===
Includes all competitions. Players with no appearances not included in the list.

As of 29 April 2023

No.	Pos.	Nat.	Name	A-League Men		Australia Cup		Total	
No.	Pos.	Nat.	Name	Apps	Goals	Apps	Goals	Apps	Goals
1	GK	(Australia)	Jack Duncan	16	0	0	0	16	0
2	DF	(New Zealand)	Dane Ingham	21+3	0	1	0	25	0
3	DF	(Australia)	Jason Hoffman	10+15	1	1	0	26	1
4	FW	(Japan)	Manabu Saitō	4+4	1	0	0	8	1
5	DF	(Australia)	Matthew Jurman	19+1	1	1	0	21	1
6	MF	(Australia)	Brandon O'Neill	14+2	1	1	0	17	1
7	FW	(Australia)	Trent Buhagiar	17+8	5	1	0	26	5
9	FW	(Georgia (country))	Beka Mikeltadze	21+2	6	1	0	24	6
10	MF	(Australia)	Reno Piscopo	14+4	1	0	0	18	1
11	FW	(Australia)	Jaushua Sotirio	16+7	3	1	0	24	3
14	MF	(Australia)	Mohamed Al-Taay	7+11	0	0	0	18	0
17	MF	(Australia)	Kosta Grozos	14+9	2	1	0	24	2
18	MF	(Australia)	Daniel Stynes	7+9	1	0	0	16	1
19	MF	(Australia)	Callum Timmins	2+11	0	0	0	13	0
20	GK	(Australia)	Michael Weier	10	0	1	0	11	0
22	DF	(Australia)	Phillip Cancar	1+2	0	0	0	3	0
25	DF	(England)	Carl Jenkinson	22+1	0	0	0	23	0
26	FW	(Australia)	Archie Goodwin	1+7	2	0+1	0	9	2
31	FW	(Australia)	Moonib Adus	0+1	0	0	0	1	0
32	MF	(Australia)	Angus Thurgate	25+1	2	1	0	27	2
33	DF	(Australia)	Mark Natta	14+6	0	0+1	0	21	0
39	DF	(Australia)	Thomas Aquilina	5+5	0	0	0	10	0
Player(s) transferred out but featured this season
4	DF	(Australia)	Jordan Elsey	7+2	1	1	0	10	1
8	MF	(Georgia (country))	Beka Dartsmelia	11+7	1	0	0	18	1
23	FW	(Australia)	Rory Jordan	0	0	0+1	0	1	0
24	DF	(New Zealand)	James McGarry	7+3	1	0+1	0	11	1

=== Disciplinary record ===
Includes all competitions. The list is sorted by squad number when total cards are equal. Players with no cards not included in the list.

As of 29 April 2023

Rank	No.	Pos.	Nat.	Name	A-League Men			Australia Cup			Total		
Rank	No.	Pos.	Nat.	Name	Booked	(yellow card) (yellow-red card)	Sent off (straight red)	Booked	(yellow card) (yellow-red card)	Sent off (straight red)	Booked	(yellow card) (yellow-red card)	Sent off (straight red)
1	6	MF	(Australia)	Brandon O'Neill	5	1	0	0	0	0	5	1	0
2	25	DF	(England)	Carl Jenkinson	4	0	1	0	0	0	4	0	1
3	5	DF	(Australia)	Matthew Jurman	5	0	0	0	0	0	5	0	0
3	7	FW	(Australia)	Trent Buhagiar	5	0	0	0	0	0	5	0	0
3	9	FW	(Georgia (country))	Beka Mikeltadze	5	0	0	0	0	0	5	0	0
6	2	DF	(New Zealand)	Dane Ingham	4	0	0	0	0	0	4	0	0
6	3	DF	(Australia)	Jason Hoffman	4	0	0	0	0	0	4	0	0
6	14	MF	(Australia)	Mohamed Al-Taay	4	0	0	0	0	0	4	0	0
6	32	MF	(Australia)	Angus Thurgate	4	0	0	0	0	0	4	0	0
10	11	FW	(Australia)	Jaushua Sotirio	3	0	0	0	0	0	3	0	0
11	1	GK	(Australia)	Jack Duncan	2	0	0	0	0	0	2	0	0
11	10	MF	(Australia)	Reno Piscopo	2	0	0	0	0	0	2	0	0
11	17	MF	(Australia)	Kosta Grozos	2	0	0	0	0	0	2	0	0
11	18	MF	(Australia)	Callum Timmins	2	0	0	0	0	0	2	0	0
11	39	DF	(Australia)	Thomas Aquilina	2	0	0	0	0	0	2	0	0
16	19	MF	(Australia)	Daniel Stynes	1	0	0	0	0	0	1	0	0
16	33	DF	(Australia)	Mark Natta	1	0	0	0	0	0	1	0	0
Player(s) transferred out but featured this season
1	4	DF	(Australia)	Jordan Elsey	1	0	1	0	0	0	1	0	1
2	8	MF	(Georgia (country))	Beka Dartsmelia	2	0	0	0	0	0	2	0	0
3	24	DF	(New Zealand)	James McGarry	1	0	0	0	0	0	1	0	0
Total					59	1	2	0	0	0	59	1	2

=== Clean sheets ===
Includes all competitions. The list is sorted by squad number when total clean sheets are equal. Numbers in parentheses represent games where both goalkeepers participated and both kept a clean sheet; the number in parentheses is awarded to the goalkeeper who was substituted on, whilst a full clean sheet is awarded to the goalkeeper who was on the field at the start and end of play. Goalkeepers with no clean sheets not included in the list.

As of 29 April 2023

Rank	No.	Nat.	Goalkeeper	A-League Men	Australia Cup	Total
1	1	(Australia)	Jack Duncan	3	0	3
Total				3	0	3

== See also ==
- 2022–23 in Australian soccer
- List of Newcastle Jets FC seasons
