= List of Newcastle Jets FC players (25–99 appearances) =

Newcastle Jets Football Club is an Australian professional association football club based in Newcastle, New South Wales. The club was formed in 2000 as Newcastle United, and played their first competitive match in October 2000, when they entered the First Round of the 2000–01 National Soccer League. The club was renamed Newcastle Jets in 2004.

== Key ==
- The list is ordered first by date of debut, and then if necessary in alphabetical order.
- Appearances as a substitute are included.
- Statistics are correct up to and including the match played on 25 July 2024. Where a player left the club permanently after this date, his statistics are updated to his date of leaving.

Positions key
GK	Goalkeeper
DF	Defender
MF	Midfielder
FW	Forward

Nationality
Unless otherwise noted, the nationality of a player is determined by the country/countries which he has played for, or if said person has not played international football, their country of birth.
Position
Playing positions are listed according to the tactical formations that were employed at the time.
Club career
Club career is defined as the first and last calendar years in which the player appeared for the club in any of the competitions listed below.
Total appearances and Total goals
Total appearances and goals comprise those in the National Soccer League, A-League Men, Australia Cup, A-League Pre-Season Challenge Cup, AFC Champions League and the 2005 Australian Club World Championship Qualifying Tournament.

== Players ==
Players highlighted in bold are still actively playing at Newcastle Jets.

List of Newcastle Jets FC players with between 25 and 99 appearances
Player	Nationality	Pos	Club career	Starts	Subs	Total	Goals	Ref.
Player	Nationality	Pos	Club career	Appearances			Goals	Ref.
John Buonavoglia	Australia	FW	2000–2001	28	0	28	7	
Travis Dodd	Australia	FW	2000–2003	53	29	82	9	
Esala Masi	Fiji	FW	2000–2004	78	18	96	18	
Daniel McBreen	Australia	FW	2000–2002	11	25	36	9	
Todd McManus	Australia	DF	2000–2001	27	0	27	1	
Andy Roberts	Australia	DF	2000–2003	63	6	69	1	
Glenn Sprod	Australia	MF	2000–2001	22	3	25	0	
Peter Tsekenis	Australia	MF	2000–2004	75	5	80	6	
Mark Wilson	Australia	MF	2000–2004	72	14	86	1	
Chris Zoricich	Australia	DF	2000–2003	47	3	50	0	
Bob Catlin	Australia	GK	2000–2001	25	0	25	0	
Mitchell Johnson	Australia	MF	2001–2004	32	16	48	2	
Daniel Beltrame	Australia	GK	2001–2003	51	0	51	0	
Matthew Bingley	Australia	DF	2001–2003	54	1	55	2	
Scott Baillie	Australia	DF	2001–2003	44	1	45	4	
Milan Blagojevic	Australia	DF	2001–2003	55	2	57	1	
Robbie Middleby	Australia	MF	2001–2004	61	1	62	6	
Joey Schirripa	Australia	DF	2001–2003	34	1	35	0	
Steve Eagleton	Australia	DF	2002–2007	49	17	66	0	
Adam Griffiths	Australia	MF	2002–2003; 2007–2009	80	0	80	0	
Scott Thomas	Australia	MF	2002–2004	46	5	51	1	
Tom Willis	Australia	GK	2003–2004	24	2	26	0	
Josh Mitchell	Australia	DF	2003–2004; 2012–2014	42	7	49	1	
Stuart Musialik	Australia	MF	2004; 2015–2021	47	17	64	3	
Nick Carle	Australia	MF	2005–2007	55	0	55	8	
Andrew Durante	Australia	DF	2005–2008	47	4	51	0	
Paul Kohler	Australia	DF	2005–2007	44	12	56	0	
Jade North	Australia	DF	2005–2008	92	1	93	3	
Liam Reddy	Australia	GK	2005–2006	27	0	27	0	
Ned Zelic	Australia	DF	2005–2006	27	0	27	1	
Mark Bridge	Australia	FW	2005–2009	51	9	60	14	
Vaughan Coveny	New Zealand	FW	2005–2007	32	5	37	10	
Ante Covic	Australia	GK	2006–2009	64	0	64	0	
Noel Spencer	Australia	MF	2007–2008	16	14	30	1	
Song Jin-hyung	South Korea	MF	2008–2010	50	2	52	5	
Kaz Patafta	Australia	MF	2008–2010	12	30	42	1	
Marko Jesic	Australia	FW	2008–2013	42	6	48	6	
Sean Rooney	Australia	FW	2008–2010	15	19	34	4	
James Virgili	Australia	FW	2009–2015	22	36	58	0	
Ljubo Milicevic	Australia	DF	2009–2011	49	1	50	0	
Sasho Petrovski	Australia	FW	2009–2011	12	30	42	11	
Ali Abbas	Iraq	FW	2009–2012; 2020–2021	34	44	78	4	
Michael Bridges	England	FW	2009–2014	33	33	66	12	
Jeremy Brockie	New Zealand	MF	2010–2012	32	9	41	11	
Kasey Wehrman	Australia	MF	2010–2012	34	2	36	0	
Ruben Zadkovich	Australia	MF	2010–2014	97	0	97	0	
Taylor Regan	Australia	DF	2010–2015	72	7	79	1	
Francis Jeffers	England	FW	2010–2012	22	4	26	2	
Jacob Pepper	Australia	MF	2010–2015	42	32	74	2	
Sam Gallaway	Australia	DF	2011–2014	43	2	45	0	
Byun Sung-hwan	South Korea	DF	2011–2012	24	2	26	2	
Tiago Calvano	Brazil	DF	2011–2012	27	1	28	1	
Jack Duncan	Australia	GK	2011; 2016–2018; 2020–2023	98	1	99	0	
Connor Chapman	Australia	DF	2012–2013	21	4	25	0	
Mark Birighitti	Australia	GK	2012–2016	77	0	77	0	
Craig Goodwin	Australia	DF	2012–2014	33	12	45	5	
Emile Heskey	England	FW	2012–2014	36	6	42	10	
Scott Neville	Australia	DF	2012–2015	42	1	43	3	
Adam Taggart	Australia	FW	2012–2014	34	10	44	18	
Joshua Brillante	Australia	MF	2012–2014	39	7	46	0	
James Brown	Australia	MF	2012–2014	16	12	28	0	
Andrew Hoole	Australia	FW	2013–2015; 2016–2017	62	15	77	6	
Zenon Caravella	Australia	MF	2013–2015	37	8	45	0	
Mitch Cooper	Australia	MF	2013–2016	17	17	34	1	
Kew Jaliens	Netherlands	DF	2013–2015	36	1	37	3	
David Carney	Australia	MF	2014–2016	35	3	38	4	
Edson Montaño	Ecuador	FW	2014–2015	23	4	27	6	
Nick Cowburn	Australia	DF	2014–2019	42	29	71	1	
Daniel Mullen	Australia	DF	2015–2017	47	2	49	0	
Enver Alivodic	Serbia	MF	2015–2016	35	1	36	4	
Mateo Poljak	Croatia	MF	2015–2017	69	6	75	4	
Lachlan Jackson	Australia	DF	2015–2021	70	22	92	1	
Morten Nordstrand	Denmark	FW	2016–2017	26	8	34	7	
Wayne Brown	England	MF	2016–2018	32	14	44	3	
Andrew Nabbout	Australia	FW	2016–2018	47	1	48	18	
Ivan Vujica	Australia	DF	2016–2019	38	10	48	0	
John Koutroumbis	Australia	MF	2016–2021	74	21	95	4	
Daniel Georgievski	Macedonia	DF	2017–2019	47	0	47	1	
Roy O'Donovan	Republic of Ireland	FW	2017–2019; 2020–2022	71	3	74	31	
Dimitri Petratos	Australia	MF	2017–2020	83	4	87	24	
Kosta Petratos	Australia	MF	2017–2021	5	23	28	1	
Joe Champness	Australia	FW	2017–2019	18	20	38	8	
Ronald Vargas	Venezuela	FW	2017–2019	28	5	33	7	
Glen Moss	Australia	GK	2017–2020	48	3	51	0	
Matthew Ridenton	New Zealand	MF	2018–2020	24	13	37	2	
Kaine Sheppard	England	FW	2018–2020	9	23	32	3	
Lewis Italiano	Australia	GK	2018–2021	31	2	33	0	
Matthew Millar	Australia	DF	2019–2021	44	1	45	4	
Connor O'Toole	Australia	DF	2020–2021	27	0	27	1	
Lucas Mauragis	Australia	FW	2020–2022; 2023–2024	31	19	50	4	
Valentino Yuel	South Sudan	FW	2020–2022	27	20	47	10	
Jordan Elsey	Australia	DF	2021–2023	35	2	37	3	
**Kosta Grozos**	Australia	MF	2021–	52	24	76	3	
**Dane Ingham**	New Zealand	DF	2021–	71	9	80	0	
Matthew Jurman	Australia	DF	2021–2023	43	2	45	1	
Beka Mikeltadze	Georgia	FW	2021–	48	2	50	19	
Daniel Penha	Brazil	MF	2021–2022	25	0	25	6	
Mohamed Al-Taay	Iraq	MF	2021–2023	9	21	30	0	
Trent Buhagiar	Australia	FW	2022–2024	33	18	51	12	
**Mark Natta**	Australia	DF	2022–	41	7	48	1	
Brandon O'Neill	Australia	MF	2022–2024	35	7	42	1	
Carl Jenkinson	England	DF	2022–2024	29	5	34	0	
Reno Piscopo	Australia	FW	2022–2024	26	8	34	2	
Daniel Stynes	Australia	MF	2022–2024	14	18	32	1	
**Thomas Aquilina**	Australia	DF	2023–	19	9	28	2	
**Phillip Cancar**	Australia	DF	2023–	24	4	28	1	
**Ryan Scott**	Australia	GK	2023–	30	0	30	0	
**Clayton Taylor**	Australia	FW	2023–	24	4	28	8	
**Daniel Wilmering**	Australia	DF	2023–	11	14	25	0	
