= 2023–24 Newcastle Jets FC season =

Newcastle Jets
2023–24 season
- Chairman: Shane Mattiske
- Manager: Robert Stanton
- Stadium: McDonald Jones Stadium
- A-League Men: 10th
- A-League Men Finals: DNQ
- Australia Cup: Round of 32
- Top goalscorer: League: Apostolos Stamatelopoulos (17); All: Apostolos Stamatelopoulos (17)
- Highest home attendance: 9,416 vs. Central Coast Mariners (27 April 2024); A-League Men
- Lowest home attendance: 2,763 vs. Brisbane Roar (14 August 2023); Australia Cup
- Average home league attendance: 5,704
- Biggest win: 3–0 vs. Wellington Phoenix (A) (9 December 2023); A-League Men
- Biggest defeat: 0–4 vs. Sydney FC (A) (19 January 2024); A-League Men
Home colours
- All statistics correct as of 27 April 2024.

The 2023–24 season was the 23rd in the history of Newcastle Jets Football Club since its establishment in 2000 and the club's 19th season in the A-League Men.

== Players ==
=== First-team squad ===
Note: Flags indicate national team as defined under FIFA eligibility rules; some limited exceptions apply. Players may hold more than one non-FIFA nationality.

No.	Pos.	Nation	Player
1	GK	AUS	Ryan Scott
3	DF	AUS	Jason Hoffman
5	DF	AUS	Lucas Mauragis
6	MF	AUS	Brandon O'Neill (captain)
7	FW	AUS	Trent Buhagiar
8	FW	AUS	Apostolos Stamatelopoulos
10	MF	AUS	Reno Piscopo
11	MF	AUS	Jacob Dowse
13	FW	AUS	Clayton Taylor
14	DF	NZL	Dane Ingham
15	MF	FRA	Jason Berthomier
17	MF	AUS	Kosta Grozos
18	MF	AUS	Daniel Stynes

No.	Pos.	Nation	Player
19	MF	AUS	Callum Timmins
20	GK	AUS	Michael Weier
22	DF	AUS	Phillip Cancar
23	DF	AUS	Daniel Wilmering
25	DF	ENG	Carl Jenkinson
26	FW	AUS	Archie Goodwin
27	DF	AUS	Nathan Grimaldi (scholarship)
29	FW	AUS	Justin Vidic (scholarship)
33	DF	AUS	Mark Natta
37	MF	NZL	Lachlan Bayliss
39	DF	AUS	Thomas Aquilina
66	GK	AUS	Zac Bowling (scholarship)

== Transfers ==
=== Transfers in ===
No.	Position	Player	Transferred from	Type/fee	Contract length	Date	Ref
27	DF	Lucas Mauragis	Wellington Phoenix	End of loan	(1 year)	10 May 2023	
11	MF	Jacob Dowse	Unattached	Free transfer	2 years	16 May 2023	
1	GK	Ryan Scott	Western United	Free transfer	2 years	8 June 2023	
13	FW	Clayton Taylor	Sydney FC NPL	Free transfer	2 years	16 June 2023	
23	DF	Daniel Wilmering	Unattached	Free transfer	2 years	16 June 2023	
37	MF	Lachlan Bayliss	Central Coast Mariners	Free transfer	1 year	27 June 2023	
66	GK	Zac Bowling	(Australia) Altona Magic	Free transfer	2 year scholarship	4 July 2023	
8	FW	Apostolos Stamatelopoulos	(Greece) PAS Giannina	Free transfer	2 years	7 July 2023	
15	MF	(France) Jason Berthomier	(France) Valenciennes	Free transfer	1 year	29 August 2023	
27	DF	Nathan Grimaldi	(Australia) Sutherland Sharks	Free transfer	1 year scholarship	12 September 2023	
29	FW	Justin Vidic	(Australia) Marconi Stallions	Free transfer	2 year scholarship	12 September 2023	

=== Transfers out ===
No.	Position	Player	Transferred to	Type/fee	Date	Ref.
4	FW	(Japan) Manabu Saitō	Unattached	End of contract	6 May 2023	
9	FW	(Georgia (country)) Beka Mikeltadze	Unattached	End of contract	6 May 2023	
14	MF	Mohamed Al-Taay	Unattached	End of contract	6 May 2023	
32	MF	Angus Thurgate	Unattached	End of contract	6 May 2023	
11	FW	Jaushua Sotirio	(India) Kerala Blasters	Undisclosed	16 May 2023	
1	GK	Jack Duncan	Wellington Phoenix	Mutual contract termination	8 June 2023	
5	DF	Matthew Jurman	Unattached	End of contract	9 June 2023	
21	GK	Noah James	(Australia) Sydney Olympic	Loan	12 January 2024	

=== Contract extensions ===
No.	Name	Position	Duration	Date	Notes
14	(New Zealand) Dane Ingham	Right-back	2 years	4 May 2023	
17	Kosta Grozos	Attacking midfielder	1 year	21 June 2023	
3	Jason Hoffman	Right-back	1 year	23 June 2023	
18	Daniel Stynes	Attacking midfielder	1 year	27 June 2023	
21	Noah James	Goalkeeper	1 year	7 September 2023	
39	Thomas Aquilina	Right-back	2 years	7 February 2024	Contract extended from end of 2023–24 until end of 2025–26.
27	Nathan Grimaldi	Centre-back	2 years	20 February 2024	Contract extended from end of 2023–24 until end of 2025–26.
33	Mark Natta	Centre-back	2 years	22 February 2024	Contract extended from end of 2023–24 until end of 2025–26.
13	Clayton Taylor	Winger	1 year	29 February 2024	Contract extended from end of 2024–25 until end of 2025–26.

== Pre-season and friendlies ==
6 August 2023	Sydney FC (Australia)	0–0	(Australia) Newcastle Jets	Sydney
		Report		Stadium: Sky Park

28 August 2023	Central Coast Mariners	v	Newcastle Jets
		Source

6 September 2023	Newcastle Jets (Australia)	0–1	(Australia) Sydney FC	Maitland
		Report	Kucharski 22'	Stadium: Maitland Sportsground; Attendance: 0 behind closed doors

20 September 2023	Newcastle Jets (Australia)	4–0	(Australia) Brisbane Roar	Coffs Harbour
19:00	Bayliss; Buhagiar; Mauragis	Report		Stadium: C.ex Coffs International Stadium; Attendance: 4,100

28 September 2023	Newcastle Jets (Australia)	3–0	(Australia) Macarthur FC
	Stamatelopoulos; Natta; Dowse	Report

7 October 2023	Newcastle Jets (Australia)	2–2	(New Zealand) Wellington Phoenix	Sydney
	Stamatelopoulos (?)	Report	Kraev (?); ? (?)	Stadium: Valentine Sports Park; Attendance: 0 (behind closed doors)

13 October 2023	Newcastle Jets (Australia)	2–2	(Australia) Western Sydney Wanderers	Maitland
	Stamatelopoulos 2'; Buhagiar 50'	Report	Beadling (?); Blair (?)	Stadium: Maitland Sportsground; Attendance: 0 (behind closed doors); Referee: Tim Danaskos

== Competitions ==
=== Overall record ===
Competition	First match	Last match	Starting round	Final position	Record							
Competition	First match	Last match	Starting round	Final position	Pld	W	D	L	GF	GA	GD	Win %
A-League Men	22 October 2023	27 April 2023	Matchday 1	10th	27	6	10	11	39	47	−8	22.22
Australia Cup	17 July 2023	14 August 2023	Play-offs	Round of 32	2	0	1	1	4	5	−1	0.00
Total					29	6	11	12	43	52	−9	20.69

Last updated: 27 April 2024
Source: Soccerway

=== A-League Men ===
==== League table ====
Pos	Team	Pld	W	D	L	GF	GA	GD	Pts	Qualification
8	Adelaide United	27	9	5	13	52	53	−1	32	
9	Brisbane Roar	27	8	6	13	42	55	−13	30	Qualification for 2024 Australia Cup play-offs
10	Newcastle Jets	27	6	10	11	39	47	−8	28	Qualification for 2024 Australia Cup play-offs
11	Western United	27	7	5	15	36	55	−19	26	Qualification for 2024 Australia Cup play-offs
12	Perth Glory	27	5	7	15	46	69	−23	22	Qualification for 2024 Australia Cup play-offs

Source: A-Leagues
Rules for classification: 1) points; 2) wins; 3) goal difference; 4) goals scored; 5) head-to-head results; 5a) head-to-head points; 5b) head-to-head goal difference; 6) Fair Play points; 7) away goal difference; 8) away goals per match; 9) home goal difference; 10) home goals per match; 11) toss of a coin in an event of a tie of two clubs.

==== Results summary ====
Away figures include Newcastle Jets 3–2 loss on neutral ground against Brisbane Roar on 14 January 2024.

Overall								Home						Away					
Pld	W	D	L	GF	GA	GD	Pts	W	D	L	GF	GA	GD	W	D	L	GF	GA	GD
27	6	10	11	39	47	−8	28	3	5	5	18	19	−1	3	5	6	21	28	−7

Last updated: 27 April 2024.
Source: Ultimate A-League

==== Results by round ====
Round	1	2	3	4	5	6	7	8	9	10	11	27	13	12	14	15	16	17	18	19	20	21	22	23	24	25	26
Ground	A	A	H	A	A	H	A	H	A	H	A	N	A	H	H	H	A	A	H	H	A	H	A	H	A	H	H
Result	D	L	D	W	L	L	W	D	L	W	D	L	L	W	L	D	D	L	D	L	D	L	D	W	W	D	L
Position	4	9	10	7	7	9	8	8	10	10	10	10	10	10	10	10	10	11	11	11	10	11	11	10	10	10	10
Points	1	1	2	5	5	5	8	9	9	12	13	13	13	16	16	17	18	18	19	19	20	20	21	24	27	28	28

Updated to match(es) played on 27 April 2024. Source: Ultimate A-League
A = Away; H = Home; N = Neutral; W = Win; D = Draw; L = Loss

==== Matches ====
Win Draw Loss Fixtures

22 October 2023 1	Perth Glory	2–2	Newcastle Jets	Perth
16:45 AWST	Taggart 2'; Colakovski 64'	Report	Grozos 14'; Stamatelopoulos 90+2'	Stadium: HBF Park; Attendance: 6,592; Referee: Tim Danaskos

29 October 2023 2	Melbourne Victory	5–3	Newcastle Jets	Melbourne
17:00 AEDT	Fornaroli 8', 31', 40' (pen.), 45+3'; Velupillay 55'	Report	Natta 6'; Taylor 49', 74'	Stadium: AAMI Park; Attendance: 13,663; Referee: Jonathon Barreiro

5 November 2023 3	Newcastle Jets	2–2	Western Sydney Wanderers	Newcastle
15:00 AEDT	Stamatelopoulos 18', 37'	Report	Brillante 61'; Antonsson 81'	Stadium: McDonald Jones Stadium; Attendance: 5,166; Referee: Ben Abraham

11 November 2023 4	Western United	0–1	Newcastle Jets	Ballarat
15:30 AEDT		Report	Stamatelopoulos 44'	Stadium: Mars Stadium; Attendance: 2,410; Referee: Casey Reibelt

25 November 2023 5	Central Coast Mariners	3–1	Newcastle Jets	Gosford
17:30 AEDT	Roux 45+2'; Wilson 57'; Reec 90+3'	Report	Goodwin 76'	Stadium: Industree Group Stadium; Attendance: 5,143; Referee: Jack Morgan
Note: Match originally set to be played home at McDonald Jones Stadium, but changed to away at Industree Group Stadium, due to turf renovations.

3 December 2023 6	Newcastle Jets	0–2	Melbourne City	Newcastle
17:00 AEDT		Report	Mazzeo 12'; Maclaren 58'	Stadium: McDonald Jones Stadium; Attendance: 5,636; Referee: Shane Skinner

9 December 2023 7	Wellington Phoenix	0–3	Newcastle Jets	Wellington
19:30 NZDT		Report	Stamatelopoulos 4', 47' (pen.); Taylor 43'	Stadium: Sky Stadium; Attendance: 4,395; Referee: Jonathan Barreiro

16 December 2023 8	Newcastle Jets	2–2	Perth Glory	Newcastle
18:00 AEDT	Stamatelopoulos 26' (pen.); Buhagiar 90+8'	Report	Taggart 47'; Colakovski 55'	Stadium: McDonald Jones Stadium; Attendance: 4,714; Referee: Shaun Evans

22 December 2023 9	Adelaide United	3–1	Newcastle Jets	Adelaide
19:15 ACDT	Ibusuki 14'; Clough 68' (pen.); Halloran 70'	Report	Vidic 89'	Stadium: Coopers Stadium; Attendance: 10,064; Referee: Ben Abraham

30 December 2023 10	Newcastle Jets	2–0	Western United	Newcastle
17:30 AEDT	Buhagiar 9', 22'	Report		Stadium: McDonald Jones Stadium; Attendance: 6,453; Referee: Adam Kersey

5 January 2024 11	Macarthur FC	1–1	Newcastle Jets	Sydney
19:45 AEDT	Germain 90+9' (pen.)	Report	Taylor 9'	Stadium: Campbelltown Stadium; Attendance: 4,234; Referee: Tim Danaskos

14 January 2024 27	Brisbane Roar	3–2	Newcastle Jets	Sydney
19:45 AEDT	O'Shea 61', 90' (pen.); Markovski 82'	Report	Stamatelopoulos 18'; Cancar 65'	Stadium: Allianz Stadium; Attendance: 3,948; Referee: Jack Morgan

19 January 2024 13	Sydney FC	4–0	Newcastle Jets	Sydney
19:45 AEDT	Wood 40'; Lolley 66'; Burgess 76', 79'	Report		Stadium: Allianz Stadium; Attendance: 11,160; Referee: Adam Bavcar

23 January 2024 12	Newcastle Jets	3–1	Brisbane Roar	Newcastle
17:00 AEDT	Stamatelopoulos 29', 54'; Mauragis 57'	Report	Majok 71'	Stadium: McDonald Jones Stadium; Attendance: 5,245; Referee: Daniel Cook

27 January 2024 14	Newcastle Jets	1–2	Wellington Phoenix	Newcastle
18:00 AEDT	Buhagiar 80'	Report	Rufer 5' (pen.); Zawada 87'	Stadium: McDonald Jones Stadium; Attendance: 5,437; Referee: Casey Reibelt

3 February 2024 15	Newcastle Jets	1–1	Melbourne Victory	Newcastle
18:00 AEDT	Stamatelopoulos 88'	Report	Miranda 20'	Stadium: McDonald Jones Stadium; Attendance: 5,930; Referee: Jonathon Barreiro

11 February 2024 16	Western Sydney Wanderers	3–3	Newcastle Jets	Sydney
17:00 AEDT	Brook 28', 31'; Marcelo 90+2'	Report	Buhagiar 5'; Stamatelopoulos 50' (pen.), 70'	Stadium: CommBank Stadium; Attendance: 9,967; Referee: Shaun Evans

16 February 2024 17	Western United	2–0	Newcastle Jets	Melbourne
17:30 AEDT	Penha 16' (pen.); Botic 55'	Report		Stadium: AAMI Park; Attendance: 2,947; Referee: Jack Morgan

25 February 2024 18	Newcastle Jets	2–2	Macarthur FC	Newcastle
18:00 AEDT	Dávila 69'; Germain 81'	Report	Goodwin 71'; Stamatelopoulos 89' (pen.)	Stadium: McDonald Jones Stadium; Attendance: 4,789; Referee: Jonathan Barreiro

2 March 2024 19	Newcastle Jets	0–1	Central Coast Mariners	Newcastle
18:00 AEDT		Report	Nisbet 75'	Stadium: McDonald Jones Stadium; Attendance: 7,117; Referee: Adam Kersey
Note: Match originally set to be played away at Industree Group Stadium, but changed to home at McDonald Jones Stadium, due to last match against Central Coast Mariners resulting in a venue swap.

9 March 2024 20	Perth Glory	2–2	Newcastle Jets	Perth
18:45 AWST	Taggart 72', 90'	Report	Taylor 40'; Mauragis 54'	Stadium: HBF Park; Attendance: 6,190; Referee: Lachlan Keevers

15 March 2024 21	Newcastle Jets	0–1	Adelaide United	Newcastle
19:45 AEDT		Report	Jovanovic 80'	Stadium: McDonald Jones Stadium; Attendance: 4,103; Referee: Daniel Elder

30 March 2024 22	Melbourne City	0–0	Newcastle Jets	Melbourne
17:30		Report		Stadium: AAMI Park; Attendance: 5,534; Referee: Daniel Cook

7 April 2024 23	Newcastle Jets	3–1	Sydney FC	Newcastle
15:00	Taylor 19'; Piscopo 28'; Stamatelopoulos 62'	Report	Gomes 45'	Stadium: McDonald Jones Stadium; Attendance: 5,765; Referee: Jack Morgan

13 April 2024 24	Brisbane Roar	0–2	Newcastle Jets	Brisbane
17:30		Report	Taylor 53'; Stamatelopoulos 63'	Stadium: Suncorp Stadium; Attendance: 7,486; Referee: Adam Kersey

19 April 2024 25	Newcastle Jets	1–1	Wellington Phoenix	Newcastle
19:45 AEDT	Paulsen 15' (o.g.)	Report	Barbarouses 71'	Stadium: McDonald Jones Stadium; Attendance: 4,376; Referee: Alireza Faghani

27 April 2024 26	Newcastle Jets	1–3	Central Coast Mariners	Newcastle
17:15 AEDT	Stamatelopoulos 47'	Report	Kuol 21'; Steele 82'; Edmondson 87'	Stadium: McDonald Jones Stadium; Attendance: 9,416; Referee: Daniel Elder

=== Australia Cup ===
Win Draw Loss

17 July 2023 Play-offs	Newcastle Jets	2–2 (a.e.t.) (4–2 p)	Melbourne Victory	Darwin
19:00 ACST	Buhagiar 18'; Goodwin 70'	Report	Velupillay 90+2'; Wilson 90+7'	Stadium: Larrakia Park; Attendance: 2,105; Referee: Jack Morgan
	Penalties
	Goodwin (penalty scored); Stynes (penalty missed); Timmins (penalty scored); Jenkinson (penalty scored); Cancar (penalty scored)		(penalty scored) Folami; (penalty missed) Wilson; (penalty scored) Velupillay; (penalty missed) Valadon

14 August 2023 Round of 32	Newcastle Jets	2–3 (a.e.t.)	Brisbane Roar	Maitland
19:30 AEST	Buhagiar 12'; Taylor 58'	Report	Scott 45+3' (o.g.); Zabala 62'; Parsons 118'	Stadium: Maitland Sportsground; Attendance: 2,763; Referee: Ben Abraham

== Statistics ==
=== Appearances and goals ===
Includes all competitions. Players with no appearances not included in the list.

As of 27 April 2024

No.	Pos.	Nat.	Name	A-League Men		Australia Cup		Total	
No.	Pos.	Nat.	Name	Apps	Goals	Apps	Goals	Apps	Goals
1	GK	(Australia)	Ryan Scott	27	0	2	0	29	0
3	DF	(Australia)	Jason Hoffman	2+7	0	0+1	0	10	0
5	DF	(Australia)	Lucas Mauragis	21+1	2	2	0	24	2
6	MF	(Australia)	Brandon O'Neill	18+5	0	2	0	25	0
7	FW	(Australia)	Trent Buhagiar	13+10	5	2	2	25	7
8	FW	(Australia)	Apostolos Stamatelopoulos	25	17	0+1	0	26	17
10	MF	(Australia)	Reno Piscopo	11+4	1	1	0	16	1
11	MF	(Australia)	Jacob Dowse	0	0	0+1	0	1	0
13	FW	(Australia)	Clayton Taylor	21+4	7	2	1	27	8
14	DF	(New Zealand)	Dane Ingham	26+1	0	2	0	29	0
15	MF	(France)	Jason Berthomier	2+5	0	0	0	7	0
17	MF	(Australia)	Kosta Grozos	25+2	1	1+1	0	29	1
18	MF	(Australia)	Daniel Stynes	7+7	0	0+2	0	16	0
19	MF	(Australia)	Callum Timmins	14+10	0	1+1	0	26	0
22	DF	(Australia)	Phillip Cancar	20+2	1	2	0	24	1
23	DF	(Australia)	Daniel Wilmering	10+12	0	0+2	0	24	0
25	DF	(England)	Carl Jenkinson	6+3	0	1+1	0	11	0
26	FW	(Australia)	Archie Goodwin	1+19	2	0+1	1	21	3
27	DF	(Australia)	Nathan Grimaldi	5+2	0	0	0	7	0
29	FW	(Australia)	Justin Vidic	1+4	1	0	0	5	1
33	DF	(Australia)	Mark Natta	24	1	2	0	26	1
37	MF	(New Zealand)	Lachlan Bayliss	6+5	0	1+1	0	13	0
39	DF	(Australia)	Thomas Aquilina	12+4	0	1	0	17	0

=== Disciplinary record ===
Includes all competitions. The list is sorted by squad number when total cards are equal. Players with no cards not included in the list.

As of 27 April 2024

Rank	No.	Pos.	Nat.	Name	A-League Men			Australia Cup			Total		
Rank	No.	Pos.	Nat.	Name	Yellow card	(yellow card) (yellow-red card)	Red card	Yellow card	(yellow card) (yellow-red card)	Red card	Yellow card	(yellow card) (yellow-red card)	Red card
1	8	FW	(Australia)	Apostolos Stamatelopoulos	4	1	0	1	0	0	5	1	0
2	6	MF	(Australia)	Brandon O'Neill	2	0	0	0	1	0	2	1	0
3	22	DF	(Australia)	Phillip Cancar	5	0	0	1	0	0	6	0	0
4	14	DF	(New Zealand)	Dane Ingham	5	0	0	0	0	0	5	0	0
5	5	DF	(Australia)	Lucas Mauragis	4	0	0	0	0	0	4	0	0
5	17	MF	(Australia)	Kosta Grozos	4	0	0	0	0	0	4	0	0
5	19	MF	(Australia)	Callum Timmins	3	0	0	1	0	0	4	0	0
8	7	FW	(Australia)	Trent Buhagiar	2	0	0	0	0	0	2	0	0
8	18	MF	(Australia)	Daniel Stynes	2	0	0	0	0	0	2	0	0
8	25	DF	(England)	Carl Jenkinson	2	0	0	0	0	0	2	0	0
8	27	DF	(Australia)	Nathan Grimaldi	2	0	0	0	0	0	2	0	0
8	39	DF	(Australia)	Thomas Aquilina	2	0	0	0	0	0	2	0	0
13	10	MF	(Australia)	Reno Piscopo	1	0	0	0	0	0	1	0	0
13	23	DF	(Australia)	Daniel Wilmering	1	0	0	0	0	0	1	0	0
13	33	DF	(Australia)	Mark Natta	1	0	0	0	0	0	1	0	0
Total					40	1	0	3	1	0	43	2	0

=== Clean sheets ===
Includes all competitions. The list is sorted by squad number when total clean sheets are equal. Numbers in parentheses represent games where both goalkeepers participated and both kept a clean sheet; the number in parentheses is awarded to the goalkeeper who was substituted on, whilst a full clean sheet is awarded to the goalkeeper who was on the field at the start of play. Goalkeepers with no clean sheets not included in the list.

As of 27 April 2024

Rank	No.	Nat.	Goalkeeper	A-League Men	Australia Cup	Total
1	1	(Australia)	Ryan Scott	5	0	5
Total				5	0	5

== See also ==
- 2023–24 Newcastle Jets FC (A-League Women) season
- List of Newcastle Jets FC seasons
