= 2022 A-Leagues All Stars Game =

2022 A-Leagues All Star Game
- Event: 2021–22 A-League Men
A-Leagues All Stars	Barcelona
(Australia) (New Zealand)	(Spain)
2	3
- Date: 25 May 2022
- Venue: Accor Stadium, Sydney, New South Wales
- Referee: Alex King
- Attendance: 70,174

The 2022 A-Leagues All Stars Game was the third edition of the A-Leagues All Stars Game, and the first since the 2014 Game. It was held at Accor Stadium in Sydney on 25 May 2022 against Spanish club Barcelona. Barcelona won the game 3–2.

The game was televised in Australia on Network 10.

== Pre-match ==
Having not played an All Stars game since the 2014 edition against Juventus, on 6 April 2022, the A-Leagues announced the return of the concept for the match against Barcelona. It was the first time Barcelona has visited Australia.

The game was in the same week as the 2022 A-League Men Grand Final. Players participating in the Grand Final did not play in the All Stars Game.

On 27 April 2022, it was announced that former Sydney FC midfielder Dwight Yorke would coach the A-Leagues All-Stars. The appointment was criticised by Football Coaches Australia, who argued that the All Stars coach should be an A-League Men or Australian national team coach. On 13 May 2022, it was announced that Yorke's assistants would be Rob Stanton, Heather Garriock and goalkeeping coach Davide Del Giovine.

The match was Barcelona's first ever game in Australia, the 68th country in which Barcelona has played.

== Squads ==
=== A-Leagues All Stars ===
On 5 May 2022, it was announced that the A-Leagues All Stars squad would consist of thirty players: 13 selected by a fan vote, 15 selected by Dwight Yorke and his assistants and two selected by A-Leagues commissioner Greg O'Rourke. Every A-League Men club had at least one player selected. While players participating in the 2022 A-League Men Grand Final were unable to play in the All Stars Game, they remained eligible for inclusion in the squad with "non-playing" status.

The initial thirteen players, selected by fan vote, were named on 19 May 2022. The remaining seventeen squad members were named on 20 May 2022.

Note: Flags indicate national team as defined under FIFA eligibility rules; some limited exceptions apply. Players may hold more than one non-FIFA nationality.

No.	Pos.	Nation	Player
1	GK	POL	Filip Kurto (Macarthur FC)
2	DF	AUS	Scott Neville (Brisbane Roar)
3	DF	AUS	Jason Davidson (Melbourne Victory)
4	DF	JAM	Adrian Mariappa (Macarthur FC)
5	MF	ENG	Jack Rodwell (Western Sydney Wanderers, captain)
7	MF	CMR	Olivier Boumal (Newcastle Jets)
8	MF	AUS	Isaías (Adelaide United)
9	FW	AUS	Jason Cummings (Central Coast Mariners)
10	MF	SRB	Miloš Ninković (Sydney FC)
11	MF	BRA	Daniel Penha (Newcastle Jets)
14	DF	AUS	Kye Rowles (Central Coast Mariners)
17	MF	AUS	Anthony Caceres (Sydney FC)
18	DF	CIV	Adama Traoré (Western Sydney Wanderers)
19	MF	AUS	Callum Timmins (Perth Glory)
20	GK	AUS	Andrew Redmayne (Sydney FC)
23	DF	AUS	Rhyan Grant (Sydney FC)

No.	Pos.	Nation	Player
26	MF	IRL	Jay O'Shea (Brisbane Roar)
27	MF	AUS	Reno Piscopo (Wellington Phoenix)
36	FW	AUS	Garang Kuol (Central Coast Mariners)
41	DF	AUS	Alexandar Popovic (Adelaide United)
66	FW	AUS	Nestory Irankunda (Adelaide United)
—	GK	ENG	Jamie Young^{a} (Western United)
—	DF	AUS	Ben Garuccio^{a} (Western United)
—	DF	AUS	Curtis Good^{a} (Melbourne City)
—	DF	SUI	Léo Lacroix^{a} (Western United)
—	DF	POR	Roderick Miranda^{a} (Melbourne Victory)
—	MF	AUS	Jake Brimmer^{a} (Melbourne Victory)
—	FW	AUS	Craig Goodwin^{a} (Adelaide United)
—	FW	AUS	Mathew Leckie^{a} (Melbourne City)
—	FW	AUS	Jamie Maclaren^{a} (Melbourne City)
—	FW	GEO	Beka Mikeltadze^{a} (Newcastle Jets)
—	FW	AUS	Marco Tilio^{a} (Melbourne City)

=== Barcelona ===
Barcelona's squad to travel to Australia was named on 22 May 2022.

Note: Flags indicate national team as defined under FIFA eligibility rules; some limited exceptions apply. Players may hold more than one non-FIFA nationality.

No.	Pos.	Nation	Player
1	GK	GER	Marc-André ter Stegen
4	DF	URU	Ronald Araújo
5	MF	ESP	Sergio Busquets (captain)
7	FW	FRA	Ousmane Dembélé
8	DF	BRA	Dani Alves
9	FW	NED	Memphis Depay
10	FW	ESP	Ansu Fati
11	FW	ESP	Adama Traoré (on loan from Wolverhampton)
17	FW	NED	Luuk de Jong (on loan from Sevilla)
18	DF	ESP	Jordi Alba

No.	Pos.	Nation	Player
21	MF	NED	Frenkie de Jong
23	DF	FRA	Samuel Umtiti
25	FW	GAB	Pierre-Emerick Aubameyang
30	MF	ESP	Gavi
31	DF	ESP	Alejandro Balde
34	MF	ESP	Álvaro Sanz
36	GK	ESP	Arnau Tenas
41	DF	ESP	Mika Màrmol
43	MF	ESP	Jandro Orellana
44	MF	ESP	Antonio Aranda

Notes:

^{a} Injured or otherwise unable to play.

== Match ==
The game was broadcast in Australia on Network 10.

=== Details ===
25 May 2022
20:05 AEST

A-Leagues All Stars	2–3	(Spain) Barcelona
Piscopo 47'; Traoré 53'	Report	Dembélé 34'; Traoré 72'; Fati 77'

Accor Stadium, Sydney
Attendance: 70,174
Referee: Alex King

A-Leagues All Stars	Barcelona

GK	1	(Poland) Filip Kurto	(substituted off) 46'
DF	3	(Australia) Jason Davidson	(substituted off) 30'
DF	14	(Australia) Kye Rowles
DF	4	(Jamaica) Adrian Mariappa	(substituted off) 58'
DF	23	(Australia) Rhyan Grant	(substituted off) 85'
MF	5	(England) Jack Rodwell (c)	(substituted off) 58'
MF	26	(Republic of Ireland) Jay O'Shea	(substituted off) 79'
MF	27	(Australia) Reno Piscopo	(substituted off) 64'
MF	11	(Brazil) Daniel Penha	(substituted off) 58'
MF	17	(Australia) Anthony Caceres	(substituted off) 79'
FW	9	(Australia) Jason Cummings	(substituted off) 57'
Substitutes:
GK	20	(Australia) Andrew Redmayne	(substituted on) 46'
DF	2	(Australia) Scott Neville	(substituted on) 58'
MF	7	(Cameroon) Olivier Boumal	(substituted on) 79'
MF	8	(Australia) Isaías	(substituted on) 58'
MF	10	(Serbia) Miloš Ninković	(substituted on) 58'
DF	18	(Ivory Coast) Adama Traoré	(substituted on) 30'
FW	19	(Australia) Callum Timmins	(substituted on) 79'
FW	36	(Australia) Garang Kuol	(substituted on) 57'
DF	41	(Australia) Alexandar Popovic	(substituted on) 85'
FW	66	(Australia) Nestory Irankunda	(substituted on) 64'
Manager:
(Trinidad and Tobago) Dwight Yorke

GK	1	(Germany) Marc-André ter Stegen	(substituted off) 46'
DF	31	(Spain) Alejandro Balde	(substituted off) 62'
DF	23	(France) Samuel Umtiti	(substituted off) 73'
DF	4	(Uruguay) Ronald Araújo
DF	8	(Brazil) Dani Alves
MF	30	(Spain) Gavi	(substituted off) 73'
MF	5	(Spain) Sergio Busquets (c)	(substituted off) 79'
MF	34	(Spain) Álvaro Sanz	(substituted off) 62'
FW	7	(France) Ousmane Dembélé	(substituted off) 78'
FW	17	(Netherlands) Luuk de Jong
FW	11	(Spain) Adama Traoré	(substituted off) 73'
Substitutes:
GK	24	(Spain) Arnau Tenas	(substituted on) 46'
FW	9	(Netherlands) Memphis Depay
MF	10	(Spain) Ansu Fati	(substituted on) 73'
DF	18	(Spain) Jordi Alba	(substituted on) 62'
FW	21	(Netherlands) Frenkie de Jong	(substituted on) 73'
FW	25	(Gabon) Pierre-Emerick Aubameyang	(substituted on) 62'
DF	41	(Spain) Mika Màrmol	(substituted on) 73'
MF	43	(Spain) Jandro Orellana	(substituted on) 79'
MF	44	(Spain) Antonio Aranda	(substituted on) 62'
Manager:
(Spain) Xavi

Match rules

- 90 minutes.
