= Nathan Grimaldi =

Australian soccer player

Personal information
- Full name: Nathan Grimaldi
- Date of birth: 15 September 2001 (age 25)
- Place of birth: Rouse Hill, Australia
- Height: 1.91 m (6 ft 3 in)
- Position: Centre-back

Team information
- Current team: St George City

Youth career
- Marconi Stallions
- Mt Druitt Town Rangers
- 2018: Sydney United 58
- 2019–2022: Sydney FC

Senior career*
Years	Team	Apps	(Gls)
2020–2022	Sydney FC NPL	21	(1)
2023	Sutherland Sharks	25	(1)
2023–2025	Newcastle Jets	8	(0)
2025–	St George City	12	(0)
- * Club domestic league appearances and goals as of 26 April 2025

Nathan Grimaldi (born 15 September 2001) is an Australian association footballer who currently plays for St George City in NPL NSW and his last played in the A-League Men for Newcastle Jets.

== Career ==
Having come through the Sydney FC academy system, Grimaldi was signed by former Sydney FC youth coach Rob Stanton shortly after taking the helm at Newcastle Jets.

He re-signed for the Hunter club on a multi-year contract ahead of the 2024–25 A-League Men season and scored a crucial goal in Newcastle's 4–1 victory of Western United in the 2024 Australia Cup qualification play-off.
