= Kosta Grozos =

Australian soccer player

Personal information
- Full name: Kostandinos Grozos
- Date of birth: 10 August 2000 (age 26)
- Place of birth: Kingsgrove, New South Wales, Australia
- Position: Defensive midfielder

Team information
- Current team: Macarthur FC
- Number: 23

Youth career
- Sutherland Sharks
- 2015–2016: Western Sydney Wanderers

Senior career*
| Years | Team | Apps | (Gls) |
| 2016–2021 | Western Sydney Wanderers NPL | 47 | (19) |
| 2018–2021 | Western Sydney Wanderers | 8 | (0) |
| 2021–2026 | Newcastle Jets | 114 | (5) |
| 2026– | Macarthur FC | 0 | (0) |

International career^{‡}
| 2017–2018 | Australia U20 | 2 | (0) |
- * Club domestic league appearances and goals as of 7 March 2026 ‡ National team caps and goals as of 6 October 2018

Kostandinos Grozos (Greek: [kostanˈdinos ˈɡrozos]; born 10 August 2000) is an Australian professional soccer player who plays as a defensive midfielder for A-League Men club Macarthur FC.

== Early life ==
Grozos was born on 10 August 2000 in Kingsgrove, a Southern suburb of Sydney, New South Wales. He is of Greek descent.

== Club career ==
=== Western Sydney Wanderers ===
In 2017, Grozos was awarded the Wanderer's NPL Player of the Year having scored 11 goals in 13 games for the Youth team in their NPL NSW 2 campaign.

Grozos was part of the 2017-18 Y-League championship winning Western Sydney Wanderers Youth team. He played the full game as they beat Melbourne City Youth 3–1 in the 2018 Y-League Grand Final on 3 February 2018.

On 7 August 2018, Grozos made his professional debut in a Round of 32 FFA Cup clash with Hellenic Athletic, starting the game before being withdrawn for Nick Fitzgerald in the 26th minute due to an injury, the Wanderers going on to win the match 4–3. He made his second appearance for Western Sydney in their 3-0 FFA Cup semi-final loss to Sydney FC on 8 October 2018, with Grozos playing the full game. Two days later, he was awarded with a two-year professional contract with the Wanderers. At the conclusion of the 2020-21 season he left the Wanderers to join the Newcastle Jets. He made 8 A-League appearances and 3 FFA Cup appearances for the first team.

=== Newcastle Jets ===
His first season at the Jets was one where he rotated between starting and playing as a substitute. In 2022-23 he started more regularly and scored his first A-League goal, in Round 16 on 12 December 2023 against the Melbourne Victory. His performances earned him a contract extension for the 2023-24 season, and in that season he played every match of the A-League regular season. He signed an additional two year contract extension in June 2024 and following the 2024-25 pre-season he was named as the Jets captain. After playing the first 7 games of the season he missed a game due to injury, then returned for a match against Sydney FC. In this game he started in the defensive line, away from his position in the central midfield, playing as a regulation central defender when his team formation had 4 defenders, or as a central sweeper with 5 defenders.

== International career ==
Grozos is a youth international for the Australia U-20s.

== Career statistics ==
=== Club ===
As of 27 April 2024.

Appearances and goals by club, season and competition
| Club | Season | League | | | National cup | | Continental | | Total | |
| Club | Season | Division | Apps | Goals | Apps | Goals | Apps | Goals | Apps | Goals |
|---|---|---|---|---|---|---|---|---|---|---|
| Western Sydney Wanderers | 2017–18 | A-League | 0 | 0 | 0 | 0 | — | | 0 | 0 |
| Western Sydney Wanderers | 2018–19 | A-League | 0 | 0 | 2 | 0 | — | | 2 | 0 |
| Western Sydney Wanderers | 2019–20 | A-League | 7 | 0 | 1 | 0 | — | | 8 | 0 |
| Western Sydney Wanderers | 2020–21 | A-League | 1 | 0 | — | | — | | 1 | 0 |
| Western Sydney Wanderers | Total | | 8 | 0 | 3 | 0 | — | | 11 | 0 |
| Newcastle Jets | 2021–22 | A-League Men | 20 | 0 | 1 | 0 | — | | 21 | 0 |
| Newcastle Jets | 2022–23 | A-League Men | 23 | 2 | 2 | 0 | — | | 25 | 2 |
| Newcastle Jets | 2023–24 | A-League Men | 27 | 1 | 2 | 0 | — | | 29 | 1 |
| Newcastle Jets | 2024–25 | A-League Men | 24 | 2 | 3 | 1 | — | | 27 | 3 |
| Newcastle Jets | 2025–26 | A-League Men | 20 | 0 | 5 | 0 | — | | 25 | 0 |
| Newcastle Jets | Total | | 114 | 5 | 13 | 1 | — | | 127 | 6 |
| Career total | | | 122 | 5 | 16 | 1 | 0 | 0 | 138 | 6 |

== Honours ==
=== Club ===
Western Sydney Wanderers

- Y-League: 2017–18
