= Reno Piscopo =

Australian soccer player

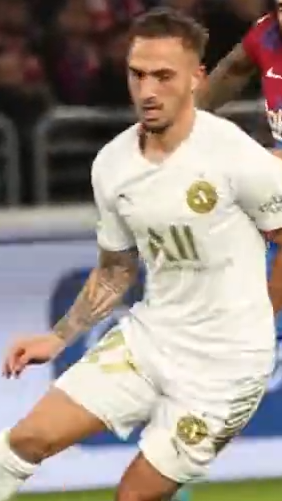
- Piscopo playing with A-Leagues All Stars in 2022

Personal information
- Full name: Reno Mauro Piscopo
- Date of birth: 27 May 1998 (age 28)
- Place of birth: Melbourne, Australia
- Height: 1.70 m (5 ft 7 in)
- Positions: Winger; attacking midfielder

Team information
- Current team: Persik Kediri
- Number: 98

Youth career
- Fawkner Blues
- North Coburg United
- Melbourne Phoenix
- 2011–2017: Inter Milan
- 2017: Torino

Senior career*
Years	Team	Apps	(Gls)
2017–2019	Renate	50	(5)
2019–2022	Wellington Phoenix	59	(8)
2022–2024	Newcastle Jets	33	(2)
2024–2026	Melbourne Victory	35	(2)
2026–	Persik Kediri	0	(0)

International career
2013	Italy U15	6	(0)
2013–2014	Italy U16	4	(1)
2014	Italy U17	3	(0)
2016	Australia U20	1	(0)
2019–2021	Australia U23	11	(2)
Medal record
Men's football
Representing Australia
AFC U23 Asian Cup
Third place	2020 Thailand	Squad
- * Club domestic league appearances and goals as of 2 May 2026

Reno Piscopo (Italian: [ˈrɛ.no ˈpis.ko.po]; born 27 May 1998) is an Australian professional soccer player who plays as a winger or attacking midfielder for Super League club Persik Kediri.

== Early life ==
Piscopo was born in Melbourne, Australia to an Italian father and Maltese mother.

== Club career ==
=== Youth ===
Piscopo began his youth career with Melbourne Phoenix, and later the Genova International School of Soccer. He was signed by Inter Milan in 2011, where he played with the youth teams for six years, before signing with Torino in 2017 to join the youth setup.

=== Renate ===
In August 2017, Piscopo was transferred to Renate, signing a three-year deal. Piscopo stated his intentions for leaving Torino were attain more first team experience. He made his league debut on 27 August as a substitute in a 3–0 win at home against Padova.

=== Wellington Phoenix ===
In August 2019, Piscopo signed a three-year deal with Wellington Phoenix.

=== Newcastle Jets ===
After departing Wellington phoenix at the conclusion of his contract, Piscopo signed a two-year deal with A-League side Newcastle Jets on 21 June 2022.

=== Melbourne Victory ===
On 5 July 2024, Piscopo signed a two-year deal with A-League Men club Melbourne Victory.

=== Persik Kediri ===
On 29 August 2026, Piscopo moved to Indonesia and signed with Super League club Persik Kediri ahead of the 2026–27 season.

== International career ==
At international youth level, he made his debut with the Italy under-15 against Russia on 20 March 2013. He later represented the Italy under-17, and most recently the Australia under-20.

Piscopo qualified for the Tokyo 2020 Olympics. He was part of the Olyroos Olympic squad. The team beat Argentina in their first group match but were unable to win another match. They were therefore not in medal contention. He is also eligible to represent Malta.

== Career statistics ==
=== Club ===
As of 2 May 2026

Appearances and goals by club, season and competition
Club	Season	League			National cup (Note: Includes Coppa Italia, Australia Cup)		Other		Total	
Club	Season	Division	Apps	Goals	Apps	Goals	Apps	Goals	Apps	Goals
A.C. Renate	2017–18	Serie C	18	0	0	0	1 (Note: Appearance in Coppa Italia Serie C)	0	19	0
A.C. Renate	2018–19	Serie C	32	5	1	0	1	0	34	5
A.C. Renate	Total		50	5	1	0	2	0	53	5
Wellington Phoenix	2019–20	A-League	21	2	0	0	—		21	2
Wellington Phoenix	2020–21	A-League	16	2	—		—		16	2
Wellington Phoenix	2021–22	A-League Men	22	4	2	0	—		24	4
Wellington Phoenix	Total		59	8	2	0	0	0	61	8
Newcastle Jets	2022–23	A-League Men	18	1	0	0	—		18	1
Newcastle Jets	2023–24	A-League Men	15	1	1	0	—		16	1
Newcastle Jets	Total		33	2	1	0	—		34	2
Melbourne Victory	2024–25	A-League Men	25	2	5	0	—		30	2
Melbourne Victory	2025–26	A-League Men	10	0	1	1	1 (Note: Appearance in a friendly aggainst Wrexham A.F.C.)	0	11	1
Melbourne Victory	Total		35	2	6	0	1	0	41	3
Career total			177	17	10	1	3	0	190	18

== Honours ==
Individual

- A-Leagues All Star: 2022
