= Rory Jordan =

Australian soccer player

Personal information
- Full name: Rory Jordan
- Date of birth: 9 February 2000 (age 26)
- Place of birth: Australia
- Position: Forward

Team information
- Current team: APIA Leichhardt

Youth career
- –2011: Kellyville Kolts FC
- 2012–2017: Marconi Stallions

Senior career*
Years	Team	Apps	(Gls)
2018–2020	Western Sydney Wanderers NPL	32	(5)
2021–2022	Northbridge Bulls	16	(4)
2022	Macarthur	1	(0)
2022–2023	Newcastle Jets	0	(0)
2023	→ APIA Leichhardt (loan)	25	(6)
2024–	APIA Leichhardt	27	(6)
- * Club domestic league appearances and goals as of 23 January 2025 ‡ National team caps and goals as of 6 March 2022

Rory Jordan (born 9 February 2000) is an Australian soccer player who plays as a forward for APIA Leichhardt.

== Club career ==
=== Newcastle Jets ===
In June 2022, Jordan signed a two-year contract with A-League Men club Newcastle Jets.

=== APIA Leichhardt ===
In January 2023, Jordan was loaned to NPL NSW club APIA Leichhardt to provide him with game time. Following an impressive debut season, the club re-signed Jordan who mutually terminated his contract with Newcastle Jets.
