= Callum Timmins =

English footballer

Personal information
- Full name: Callum Timmins
- Date of birth: 23 December 1999 (age 26)
- Place of birth: Birmingham, England
- Height: 1.82 m (6 ft 0 in)
- Position: Central midfielder

Team information
- Current team: Phnom Penh Crown (on loan from Perth Glory)
- Number: 45

Youth career
- Birmingham City
- 2015–2019: Perth Glory

Senior career*
Years	Team	Apps	(Gls)
2016–2018	Perth Glory NPL	46	(3)
2017–2019	Perth Glory	3	(0)
2019	Balcatta	4	(0)
2020	ECU Joondalup	16	(4)
2020–2022	Perth Glory	42	(4)
2022–2025	Newcastle Jets	62	(0)
2025–	Perth Glory	12	(0)
2026–	→ Phnom Penh Crown (loan)	3	(0)
- * Club domestic league appearances and goals as of 9 November 2026 ‡ National team caps and goals as of 31 December 2017

Callum Timmins (born 23 December 1999) is an English professional footballer who plays as a central midfielder for Phnom Penh Crown in the Cambodian Premier League, on loan from Perth Glory. Born in Birmingham, England, he moved to Perth, Australia in 2015 and began his senior career with Perth Glory, making professional debut in December 2017.

After spending time with Balcatta and ECU Joondalup, Timmins rejoined Perth Glory in January 2021, going on to establish himself as a regular in the club's midfield. In May 2022, he was selected for the A-Leagues All Stars team that faced Barcelona. He subsequently joined Newcastle Jets in August 2022, spending three seasons with the club before returning to Perth Glory in May 2025 on a three-year contract.

Eligible to represent both England and Australia, Timmins was called up to the Australia under-19 squad in January 2017.

== Club career ==
=== Perth Glory ===
Timmins began his football career at Birmingham City where he progressed at the club for six years. Because of his emigration to Australia, Timmins joined A-League Men side Perth Glory. Initially, he played three matches for Perth Glory’s under-18 side for the 2015–16 season. However, Birmingham City refused to release Timmins from an academy contract, forcing him to spend two years training with the club’s youth academy without being able to play in a competitive game. As a result, he had to wait until on 13 March 2017 to make an appearance for Perth Glory Youth, in a 4–0 loss to Balcatta. On 17 July 2017, Timmins scored his first goal for Perth Glory Youth, in a 5–0 win against Mandurah City. Two days later on 19 July 2017, he was called up to the club's first team for the pre–season friendly match against Inglewood United, coming on as a second–half substitute, in a 3–1 loss. After the match, manager Kenny Lowe said: "Callum Timmins looked really good and the young AIS lad, Jacob Italiano, was also impressive. We had three 15-year-olds out there in the second half and they performed really well. I’d also like to thank our members and fans who came out to support the lads on what wasn’t a great night weather-wise. Their backing was much appreciated."

On 24 November 2017, Timmins was promoted to the Perth Glory’s first team when he was named in the club’s squad as an unused substitute, in a 3–1 win against Melbourne City. On 30 December 2017, Timmins made his professional debut for Perth Glory, coming on as a 83rd-minute substitute, in a 6–0 loss against Sydney FC. He made two more appearances for the club's first team during the 2017–18 season, both as a substitute. Following this, Timmins spent the rest of the 2018 season and the whole 2019 season, playing for Perth Glory Youth. At the end of the 2018–19 season, Timmins was released by the club.

=== Balcatta FC/ECU Joondalup ===
After signing for Balcatta for the 2019 season, Timmins joined ECU Joondalup for the 2020 season, reuniting with manager Lowe.

=== Perth Glory (second spell) ===
On 8 January 2021, Timmins re-joined Perth Glory on a free transfer. He made his second debut for the club, starting a match and played 78 minutes before being substituted in the 78th minute, in a 5–3 win against Adelaide United on 20 January 2021. In a match against Melbourne City on 31 January 2021, however, Timmins was substituted in the 36th minute, because according to manager Richard Garcia, he felt that "Timmins kept plugging away and trying to find his feet", as Perth Glory went on to win 2–1. After missing two matches, Timmins made his return to the first team, starting a match and played 58 minutes before being substituted, in a 2–1 loss against Central Coast Mariners on 2 March 2021. After missing two matches in early–May, he made his return to the starting line–up against Melbourne Victory on 9 May 2021, only for him to give away a penalty for handball, but it was saved by teammate Liam Reddy, as the club went on to win 2–1. Following his return, Timmins became a first team regular for the rest of the 2020–21 season, playing in the defensive midfield position. On 30 May 2021, he scored his first goal for Perth Glory from "a thunderous long-range strike", in a 2–2 draw against Wellington Phoenix. After the match, his goal against Wellington Phoenix earned Goal of Matchweek award. At the end of the 2020–21 season, Timmins made nineteen appearances and scoring once in all competitions. Following this, he signed a two-year contract with the club, keeping him until 2023.

At the start of the 2021–22 season, Timmins missed the first three league games of the season, due to a calf injury. On 8 December 2021, he returned to the first team from injury, coming on as a 70th-minute substitute, in a 1–0 loss against Melbourne City. After missing one match, Timmins returned to the first team, coming on as a second-half substitute, in a 2–0 win against Brisbane Roar on 20 February 2022. He continued to regain his first team place, playing in the midfield position. On 2 March 2022, Timmins scored his first goal of the season, in a 2–2 draw against Melbourne City. On the last game of the season against Melbourne City, he scored twice for Perth Glory, in a 2–0 win. At the end of the 2021–22 season, Timmins made twenty–two appearances and scoring three times in all competitions.

On 20 May 2022, Timmins was called up to the A-League All-Stars team in a friendly with Barcelona. On 29 July 2022, however, he left Perth Glory along with Daniel Stynes by mutual consent.

=== Newcastle Jets ===
On 4 August 2022, Timmins, along with Stynes, joined Newcastle Jets.

After missing the opening game of the season, he made his debut for the club, coming on as a 77th-minute substitute, in a 3–1 win against Wellington Phoenix on 22 October 2022. After missing another two matches, Timmins returned to the first team, coming on as a late substitute, in a 2–1 win against Central Coast Mariners on 11 December 2022. However, his return was soon short–lived when he missed three matches in early–January. On 4 February 2023, Timmins returned to the first team, coming on as a 70th-minute substitute, in a 2–2 draw against Perth Glory. However, his return was short–lived once again when he didn’t play for a month. On 18 March 2023, Timmins made his return to the first team, coming on as a 82nd-minute substitute, in a 2–2 draw against Perth Glory. After missing a further one match, he returned to the starting line–up and played 58 minutes before being substituted, in a 2–0 loss against Sydney FC on the last game of the season. At the end of the 2022–23 season, Timmins made thirteen appearances in all competitions.

At the start of the 2023–24 season, Timmins was one of the four players to successfully convert their penalty in the shootout, as Newcastle Jets beat Melbourne Victory 4–2 following a 2–2 draw. After missing three matches in mid–November, he returned to the first team, coming on as a 78th-minute substitute, in a 3–0 win against Wellington Phoenix on 9 December 2023. Following this, Timmins soon regained his place in the first team, where he played in the midfield positions. At the end of the 2023–24 season, Timmins made twenty–six appearances in all competitions. Following this, he signed a contract extension with Newcastle Jets for another season.

At the start of the 2024–25 season, Timmins set up one of the goals for Justin Vidic to help Newcastle Jets beat Rockdale Ilinden FC 2–1 during the Round of 32 of the 2024 Australia Cup. After missing the opening game of the season due to a rib injury, he returned from injury, coming on as a 69th-minute substitute, in a 2–1 win against Macarthur FC on 25 October 2024. Following his return from injury, Timmins regained his first team place, playing in the midfield position. At the end of the 2024–25 season, he made twenty–eight appearances in all competitions. On 20 May 2025, it was announced that Timmins was released by Newcastle Jets.

=== Perth Glory (third spell) ===
On 28 May 2025, Timmins re-joined Perth Glory for the third spell, signing a three-year contract. Upon joining the club, he said: "I’m very excited to sign at Perth Glory and help them push back up to where they deserve to be. Perth being my home, it’s going to make me work harder than anywhere else as the club holds a special place for me, not only as a player, but as a supporter and I want to see the club succeed. Being from Perth and playing for Glory makes me incredibly proud and coming out to play at HBF Park in front of all the Glory Members and fans is something I’ve really missed and wanted to feel again in my career."

He made his third debut for Perth Glory, starting a match and played 106 minutes before being substituted, as the club lost 8–7 on penalties following a 1–1 draw in the first round of the Australia Cup. After missing the opening game of the season due to an injury, Timmins made his return from injury, coming on as a 61st-minute substitute, in a 4–0 loss against Melbourne City on 25 October 2025. However, he suffered a calf injury that saw him out for two months. On 6 February 2026, Timmins made his return from injury, coming on as a 87th-minute substitute, in a 2–2 draw against Macarthur FC. However, he soon suffered a thigh injury that saw him out of the rest of the 2025–26 season. At the end of the 2025–26 season, Timmins made thirteen appearances in all competitions.

== International career ==
Timmins was eligible to play for England (his birthplace) and Australia. In January 2017, he was called up to Australia U19 for the training session ahead of the AFC U-19 Championship qualification.

== Personal life ==
Born Birmingham, England, Timmins moved to Australia with his family in 2015 when his older brother moved there, bringing him and his family along. He attended Churchlands Senior High School. Timmins has since obtained Australian citizenship and considers himself Australian.

== Honours ==
Individual

- A-Leagues All Star: 2022
