= Beka Dartsmelia =

Georgian footballer

Personal information
- Date of birth: 21 March 2000 (age 26)
- Place of birth: Georgia
- Height: 1.77 m (5 ft 10 in)
- Position: Central midfielder

Team information
- Current team: Samgurali
- Number: 21

Senior career*
Years	Team	Apps	(Gls)
2017–2020	Dinamo Tbilisi	3	(0)
2019–2020	→ Locomotive Tbilisi (loan)	8	(0)
2020–2022	Locomotive Tbilisi	71	(4)
2022–2023	Newcastle Jets	18	(1)
2023	FC Saburtalo	0	(0)
2023–2024	Samgurali	27	(0)

International career
2017	Georgia U17	3	(0)
2018–2019	Georgia U19	7	(0)
2021–	Georgia U21	8	(1)
- * Club domestic league appearances and goals as of 3 December 2023

Beka Dartsmelia (born 21 March 2000) is a Georgian professional footballer who plays as a midfielder for Samgurali. He has previously played for Georgian clubs Dinamo Tbilisi, Locomotive Tbilisi, Australian side Newcastle Jets and FC Saburtalo.

== Club career ==
=== Newcastle Jets ===
In August 2022, Dartsmelia joined Newcastle Jets, signing a multi-year contract. He made his debut for the club on 15 October 2022 in a 2–1 win over Perth Glory. Dartmelia scored his first goal for Newcastle in just his second appearance for the club in a 3–1 win over Wellington Phoenix. In March 2023, Dartsmelia departed the club.
