= Beka Mikeltadze =

Georgian footballer

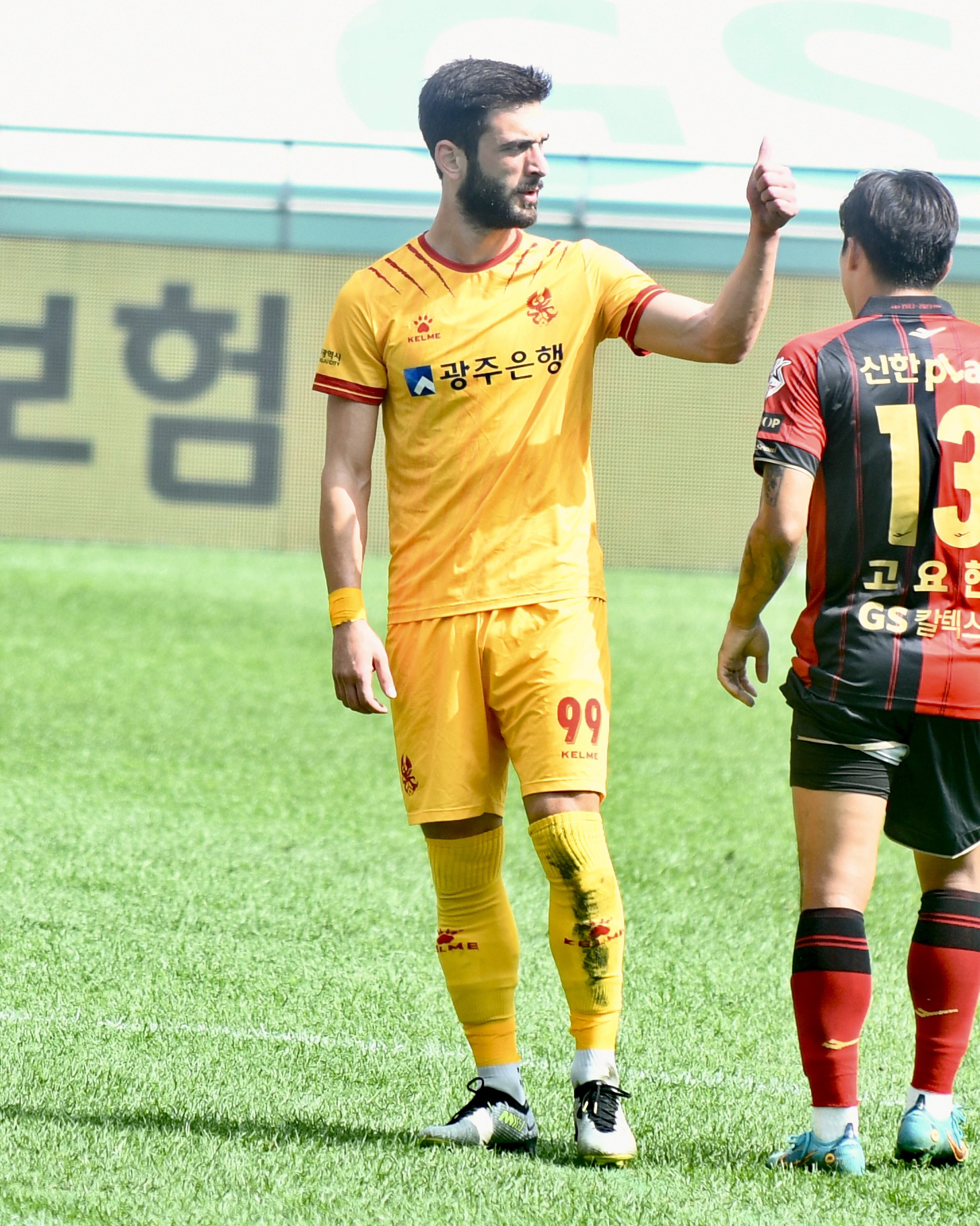
- Mikeltadze in 2023

Personal information
- Full name: Beka Mikeltadze
- Date of birth: 26 November 1997 (age 28)
- Place of birth: Kutaisi, Georgia
- Height: 1.85 m (6 ft 1 in)
- Position: Forward

Team information
- Current team: Gimhae FC 2008
- Number: 9

Youth career
- 2010–2013: Zugdidi
- 2013–2014: Zestaponi

Senior career*
Years	Team	Apps	(Gls)
2014	Zestaponi	6	(0)
2015–2017	Dinamo Tbilisi	47	(16)
2018	Rustavi	13	(3)
2018–2019	Anorthosis Famagusta	23	(2)
2019–2020	Rubin Kazan	11	(1)
2020	→ Rotor Volgograd (loan)	1	(0)
2020	Rotor Volgograd	12	(0)
2021	Xanthi	17	(3)
2021–2023	Newcastle Jets	47	(19)
2023–2024	Gwangju FC	26	(4)
2025	Montedio Yamagata	4	(0)
2026–	Gimhae FC 2008	17	(4)

International career^{‡}
2013–2014	Georgia U17	15	(4)
2015–2016	Georgia U19	12	(3)
2017–2018	Georgia U21	13	(5)
2020–	Georgia	2	(0)
- * Club domestic league appearances and goals as of 8 August 2026 ‡ National team caps and goals as of 18 November 2020

Beka Mikeltadze (Georgian: ბექა მიქელთაძე; born 26 November 1997) is a Georgian professional footballer who plays as a forward and currently play for K League 2 club, Gimhae FC 2008.

== Club career ==
In 2018, after some successful seasons with Dinamo Tbilisi and Rustavi, Mikeltadze confirmed that some Russian clubs, including Orenburg and Lokomotiv Moscow were interested in signing him, however he moved to Cyprus and signed for Anorthosis Famagusta.

On 8 July 2019, he signed with Russian Premier League club FC Rubin Kazan. He made his debut for Rubin on 21 July 2019 as a half-time substitute in an away game against FC Dynamo Moscow and scored the winning goal in the 93rd minute to make the score 1–0.

On 11 February 2020, he joined Rotor Volgograd on loan until the end of the 2019–20 season. On 21 June 2020, he re-signed with Rotor on a permanent basis.

On 19 February 2021, he moved to Greek club Xanthi.

=== Newcastle Jets ===
On 6 July 2021, Mikeltadze signed a two-year deal with A-League Men club Newcastle Jets. Mikeltadze made his debut against Central Coast Mariners at the Newcastle International Sports Centre in a 2–1 defeat, where he played the entire match. In the following fixture against Western Sydney Wanderers, Mikeltadze scored his first goal for the club with a penalty kick in the 19th minute, slotting the ball past Tomás Mejías.

At the conclusion of the 2022–23 A-League season, Mikeltadze departed Newcastle after 50 appearances and 19 goals in all competitions.

=== Gwangju FC ===
Mikeltadze moved to South Korean club Gwangju FC after departing Newcastle.

=== Montedio Yamagata ===
On 23 December 2024, Mikeltadze was announce official signing to J2 League club, Montedio Yamagata from 2025 season.

=== Gimhae FC 2008 ===
On 18 January 2026, Mikeltadze was announce official transfer to K League 2 promoted club, Gimhae FC 2008 for 2026 season.

== International career ==
He made his debut for Georgia national football team on 15 November 2020 in a Nations League game against Armenia. He substituted Valerian Gvilia in the 80th minute.

== Career statistics ==
As of 18 January 2026

Appearances and goals by club, season and competition
Club	Season	League			National Cup		Continental		Other		Total	
Club	Season	Division	Apps	Goals	Apps	Goals	Apps	Goals	Apps	Goals	Apps	Goals
Zestaponi	2014–15	Umaglesi Liga	6	0	1	0	—		—		7	0
Dinamo Tbilisi	2014–15	Umaglesi Liga	0	0	0	0	—		—		0	0
Dinamo Tbilisi	2015–16	Umaglesi Liga	1	0	1	0	—		—		2	0
Dinamo Tbilisi	2016	Umaglesi Liga	11	1	3	0	—		—		14	1
Dinamo Tbilisi	2017	Erovnuli Liga	35	15	4	1	—		—		39	16
Dinamo Tbilisi	Total		47	16	8	1	0	0	0	0	55	17
Rustavi	2018	Erovnuli Liga	13	3	0	0	—		—		13	3
Anorthosis Famagusta	2018–19	Cypriot First Division	23	2	0	0	2	0	—		25	2
Rubin Kazan	2019–20	Russian Premier League	11	1	0	0	—		—		11	1
Rotor Volgograd (loan)	2019–20	Russian National Football League	1	0	0	0	—		—		1	0
Rotor Volgograd	2020–21	Russian Premier League	12	0	1	0	—		—		13	0
Xanthi	2020–21	Super League Greece 2	17	3	0	0	—		2	1	19	4
Newcastle Jets	2021–22	A-League Men	24	13	—		—		—		24	13
Newcastle Jets	2022–23	A-League Men	23	6	1	0	—		—		24	6
Newcastle Jets	Total		47	19	1	0	0	0	0	0	48	19
Gwangju FC	2023	K League 1	10	2	—						10	2
Gwangju FC	2024	K League 1	18	3	2	0	—				20	3
Gwangju FC	Total		28	5	2	0	—				30	5
Montedio Yamagata	2025	J2 League	4	0	—				2	0	6	0
Gimhae FC 2008	2026	K League 2	0	0	0	0	—				0	0
Career total			211	51	13	1	4	0	2	1	230	53

== Honours ==
Individual

- A-Leagues All Star: 2022
