= Phillip Cancar =

Australian soccer player

Phillip Čančar
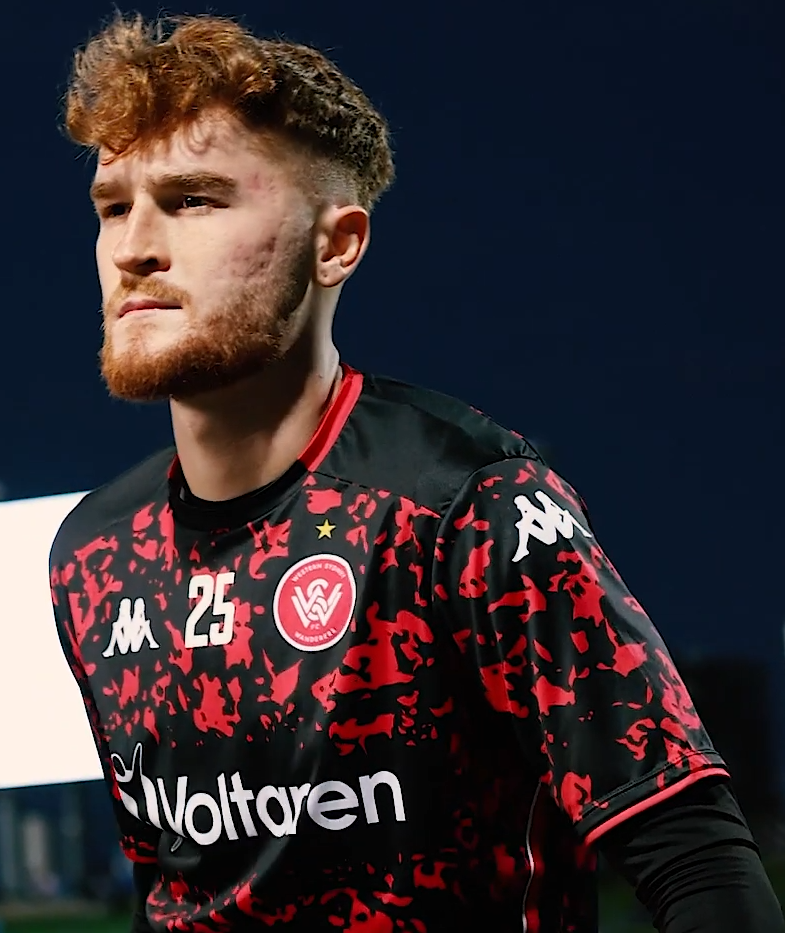
- Čančar with Western Sydney Wanderers in 2022

Personal information
- Full name: Phillip Čančar
- Date of birth: 11 May 2001 (age 25)
- Place of birth: Wollongong, Australia
- Height: 1.86 m (6 ft 1 in)
- Position: Central defender

Youth career
- –2013: Wollongong Wolves
- 2014–2015: FNSW NTC
- 2016–2018: Sydney FC
- 2018–2019: Lokomotiva
- 2019–2020: Hrvatski Dragovoljac

Senior career*
Years	Team	Apps	(Gls)
2019–2020	Hrvatski Dragovoljac	6	(0)
2020–2022	Western Sydney Wanderers	12	(1)
2021–2022	Western Sydney Wanderers NPL	13	(1)
2022–2023	Livingston	3	(0)
2023–2025	Newcastle Jets	43	(1)
2025–2026	Western Sydney Wanderers	11	(1)
- * Club domestic league appearances and goals as of 27 April 2026 ‡ National team caps and goals as of 14 February 2022

Phillip Čančar (Bosnian: [ˈtʃantʃar]; born 11 May 2001) is an Australian professional soccer player who last played as a central defender for Western Sydney Wanderers.

== Early life ==
Čančar was born and raised in the Illawarra region of Wollongong, Australia. His parents were originally from Bosnia but had moved to Croatia before ultimately seeking refuge in Australia. He attended Edmund Rice College with Tate Russell.

== Club career ==
=== Youth career ===
Čančar started his youth career in the National Premier Leagues, the second tier of Australian football, where he would play for the local club, Wollongong Wolves, before moving to the Football NSW Institute in 2014.

He would join Sydney FC through the academy system, playing alongside Jake Hollman, Callum Talbot and Marco Tilio. During his time at the Blues, he won the U18 Championship Final against Sydney United, on 14 September 2017, where his side won after extra time.

=== Croatia ===
In 2018, Čančar moved to Croatia and began his European journey at Lokomotiva, where he spent a year in the youth ranks and later joining for Hrvatski Dragovoljac, a team that competes in the Second League. Due to issues with paperwork and league rules, Cancar was initially unable to play for his team. However, after a recent change in management, these issues were resolved, and Cancar was finally given the opportunity to showcase his skills in the first team.

He made his senior club debut on 18 October 2019 against Hajduk II, coming off the bench in the 88th minute of a 1–0 home win. During a COVID-19 lockdown, Čančar's home was struck by an earthquake that nearly risked his flight back to Australia to visit his family who was in Unanderra. On 22 July 2020, Čančar scored in a friendly match for his side against NK Jarun, scoring a stoppage time goal to win the match 3–2 at full time. He would make a further 5 league appearance for his club before leaving due to his contract expiring.

=== Western Sydney Wanderers ===
On 16 November 2020, it was announced that Čančar signed for A-League club Western Sydney Wanderers on a one-year contract. He became the fourth signing under Carl Robinson. Cancar first played in the Wanderer's NPL squad that played in NSW League One. After his consistent and impressive performances on the field, Cancar scored his first official senior goal against Mounties Wanderers. Impressed by Cancar's performances, Robinson invited him to train with the first-team squad and soon offered Cancar a contract extension on 8 November 2021, which ensured his stay until the end of the 2021–22 season. After an interview Kick360, Cancar spoke highly of new signing Jack Rodwell, who provided him with valuable guidance and support both on and off the field. When former coach Robinson was sacked, Cancar explained how he found a new mentor in Marko Rudan, who helped him further develop his skills as a player from Rudan's experience as a player.

Cancar was first named in the first-team match squad against Melbourne City but did not feature. Exactly a year later, he would make his professional club debut against the same team, on 11 February 2022, coming on in the 88th minute in a 3–1 home defeat. A week later, his first A-League start for the club came against Melbourne Victory where his side won 2–0. On 5 March 2023, Cancar played in his first Sydney Derby where his side won 2–0. After the match, Cancar would receive praises for his defensive performance that kept a clean sheet and earning his side 3-points against their rivals. At the end of the season, despite the club's multiple attempts to keep him, Wanderers announced that Cancar was set to leave due to an opportunity to return to Europe.

=== Livingston ===
On 13 May 2022, Scottish club Livingston announced the signing of Cancar, agreeing a pre-contract agreement that would expire in 2024. After just two months with the club, Cancar put in an impressive performance earning him the man of the match award in a League Cup match against Kelty Hearts. Despite being subbed on in the 6th minute after Cristian Montaño picked up an injury, he made an immediate impact, keeping a clean sheet and scoring his first goal for the club. On 30 July 2022, Cancar made his Premiership debut against Rangers, but after a poor start, was taken off early in the 34th minute. Struggling to find playing time, on 8 February 2023, it was confirmed that Cancar had departed the club after only making 3 league appearances, having been an unused substitute in 15 games and brought on only twice.

=== Newcastle Jets ===
Cancar returned to Australia to join with Newcastle Jets, joining with former teammate Thomas Aquilina who played with the Western Sydney Wanderers. He made his debut on 18 February as a 84th-minute substitute in a 2–1 win at Macarthur FC. In his next appearance, on 2 April, he came on as a 86th-minute substitute against Melbourne City. On 5 January Cancar conceded a last minute stoppage time penalty to let Macarthur FC equaliser. The game ended one each

On 27 June 2025, Čančar was released by Newcastle Jets to pursue an opportunity elsewhere.

=== Return to Western Sydney Wanderers ===
Having left Newcastle, Cancar returned to his former club, Western Sydney Wanderers, for the 2025-26 season.
