= Mark Natta =

Australian soccer player

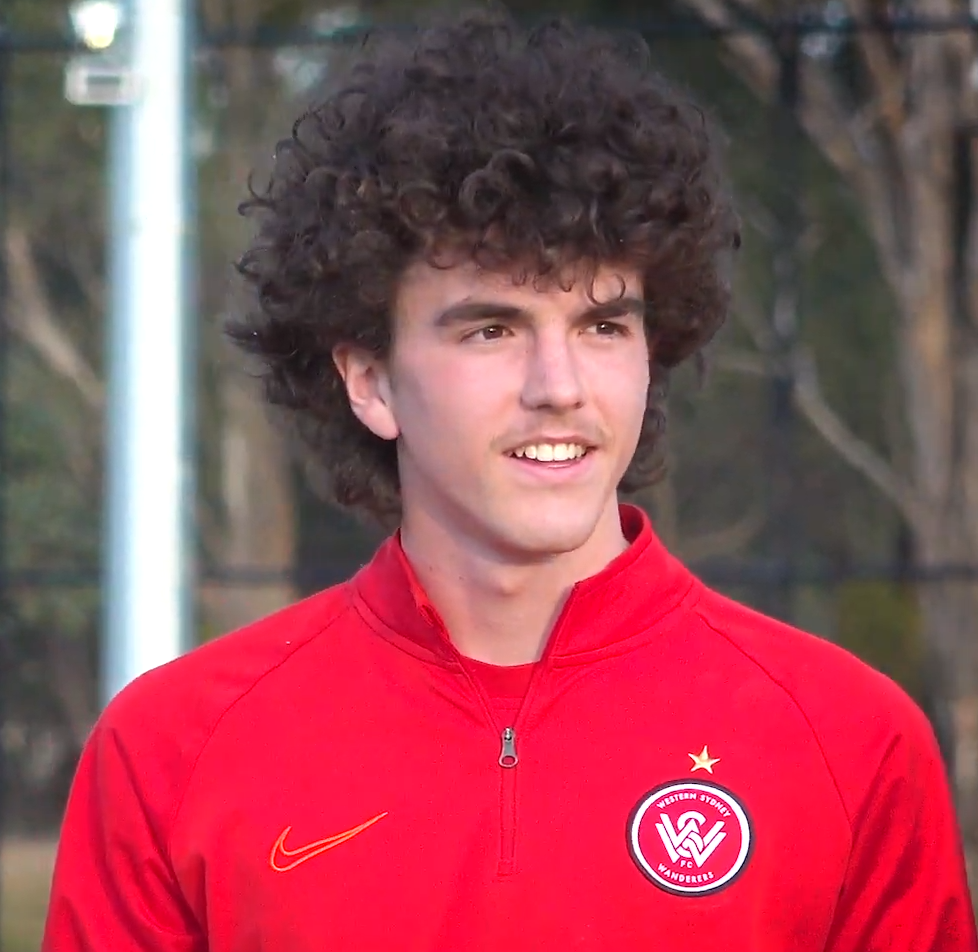
- Natta with Western Sydney Wanderers in 2020

Personal information
- Full name: Mark Natta
- Date of birth: 28 November 2002 (age 23)
- Place of birth: Sydney, New South Wales, Australia
- Height: 1.89 m (6 ft 2 in)
- Position: Central defender

Team information
- Current team: Cesena

Youth career
- Sutherland Sharks
- APIA Leichhardt
- 2015–2019: Western Sydney Wanderers

Senior career*
Years	Team	Apps	(Gls)
2019–2022	Western Sydney Wanderers NPL	17	(1)
2021–2022	Western Sydney Wanderers	23	(0)
2022–2026	Newcastle Jets	89	(3)
2026–	Cesena	0	(0)
Medal record
Men's football
Representing Australia
WAFF U-23 Championship
Runner-up	2024 Saudi Arabia
AFF U-16 Youth Championship
Third place	2017 Thailand	U-17 Team
- * Club domestic league appearances and goals as of 11 July 2026

Mark Natta (Italian: [ˈnat.ta]; born 28 November 2002) is an Australian professional soccer player who plays as a central defender for Cesena in Serie B. Born in Australia, he is a dual citizen of both Australia and Italy.

== Early life ==
Natta played in the 2015 Little League World Series, representing Cronulla Little League from Sydney and the Australia region.

== Club career ==
=== Western Sydney Wanderers ===
Natta joined Western Sydney Wanderers when he was 13. On 19 January 2021, Natta made his debut for Western Sydney Wanderers in a 1-0 win over Central Coast Mariners.

=== Newcastle Jets ===
On 4 July 2022, it was announced that Natta had signed a two-year deal with Newcastle Jets. He made his debut for Newcastle Jets in a 2–1 win over Perth Glory.

On 28 May 2026, the club confirmed that Natta would depart the club at the expiration of his contract at the end of the 2025–26 season.

=== Cesena ===
In July 2026, Italian side Cesena announced the signing of Natta on a two-year contract.

== Honours ==
Australia U-23

- WAFF U-23 Championship: runner-up 2024

Australia U-17

- AFF U16 Youth Championship: 3rd place 2017

Individual

- PFA A-League Men Team of the Season: 2025–26
