= Thomas Aquilina =

Australian soccer player

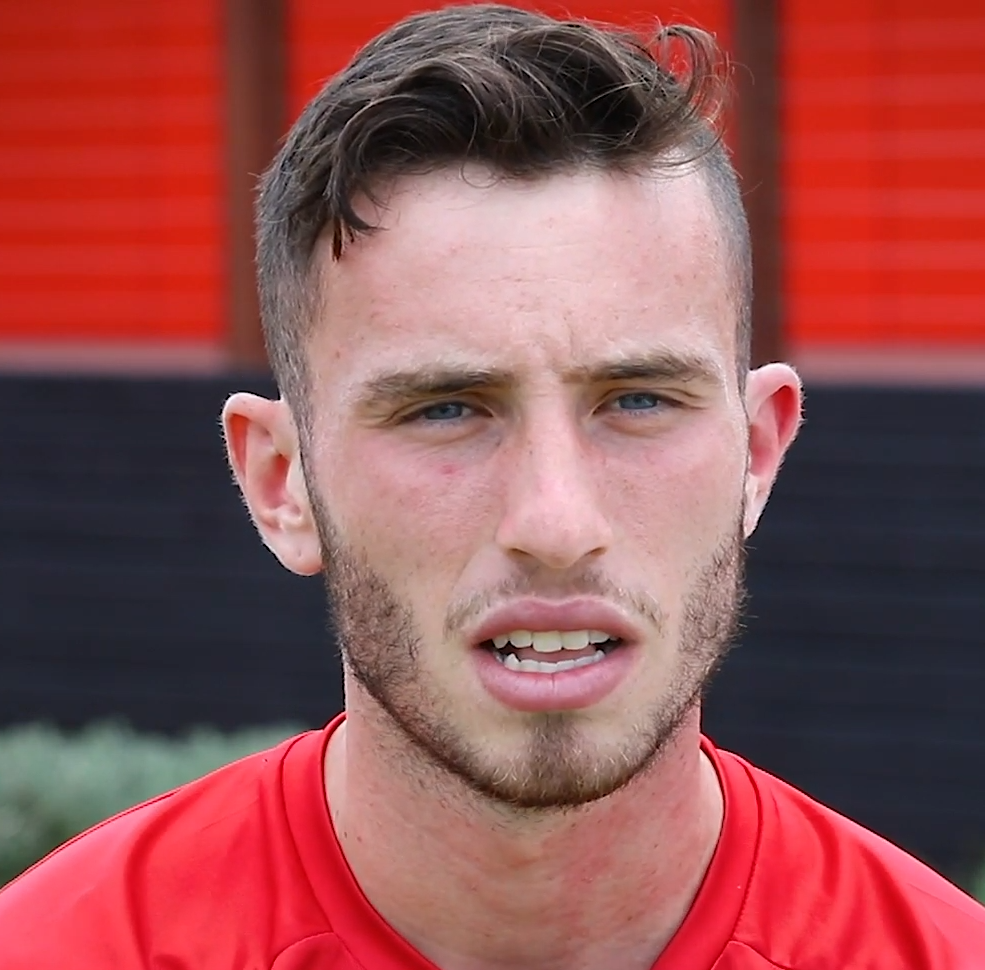
- Aquilina with Western Sydney Wanderers in 2021

Personal information
- Full name: Thomas Kevin Aquilina
- Date of birth: 2 February 2001 (age 25)
- Place of birth: Camden, Australia
- Height: 1.78 m (5 ft 10 in)
- Position: Right-back

Team information
- Current team: Newcastle Jets
- Number: 39

Youth career
- Blacktown Spartans
- FNSW NTC
- 2015-2017: Western Sydney Wanderers

Senior career*
Years	Team	Apps	(Gls)
2017–2022	Western Sydney Wanderers NPL	32	(2)
2019	→ Sutherland Sharks (loan)	1	(0)
2020–2022	Western Sydney Wanderers	40	(0)
2022–2023	Central Coast Mariners	12	(0)
2023–	Newcastle Jets	63	(2)

International career
- Australia U-16s
- Australia U-19s
2023	Australia U-23s	1	(0)
Medal record
Men's football
Representing Australia
AFF U-19 Youth Championship
First place	2019 Vietnam	U-20 Team
AFF U-16 Youth Championship
First place	2016 Cambodia	U-17 Team
- * Club domestic league appearances and goals as of 27 April 2025

Thomas Kevin Aquilina (/ˌækwɪˈliːnə/, AK-wə-LEE-nə; Maltese: [a.kɪˈliː.na]; born 2 February 2001) is an Australian professional soccer player who plays as a right-back for the Newcastle Jets.

== Early life ==
Aquilina attended Bossley Park High School where he was enrolled into the selective Talented Football Program.

Aquilina is of Maltese descent.

== Career ==
=== Western Sydney Wanderers ===
Aquilina's professional football career began at the Western Sydney Wanderers, having come through their youth program, starting in the U15 squad in 2015. Aquilina made his A-League debut in the first round of the 2020-21 season, and had reportedly attracted interest from European clubs by the end of his first season. Aquilina spent a second season at the Wanderers, before departing after 42 appearances at the end of the 2021-22 season.

=== Central Coast Mariners ===
Having departed Western Sydney Wanderers, Aquilina joined the Central Coast Mariners for the 2022-23 season. Aquilina cited his reason for his move as an opportunity to build his career with the Mariners towards a move to a European club, given the Mariners had a strong recent track record of sending their talented players to play in Europe.

Aquilina made 13 appearances for the Mariners across all competitions, before departing mid-way through his first season with the club.

=== Newcastle Jets ===
Aquilina's departure from the Mariners came via a swap deal with the Newcastle Jets, which saw Aquilina join the Jets in exchange for James McGarry heading to the Central Coast. The Mariners and Jets share a fierce rivalry, the F3 Derby, making this a controversial move for both players involved.

== Career statistics ==
As of match played 23 June 2026

Appearances and goals by club, season and competition
Club	Season	League			Domestic Cup		Continental		Total	
Club	Season	Division	Apps	Goals	Apps	Goals	Apps	Goals	Apps	Goals
Western Sydney Wanderers Youth	2017	NPL2 NSW	5	0	-	-	-	-	5	0
Western Sydney Wanderers Youth	2018	NPL2 NSW	5	0	-	-	-	-	5	0
Western Sydney Wanderers Youth	2019	NPL2 NSW	8	2	-	-	-	-	8	2
Western Sydney Wanderers Youth	2020	NPL NSW	11	0	-	-	-	-	11	0
Western Sydney Wanderers Youth	2020	NPL2 NSW	2	0	-	-	-	-	2	0
Western Sydney Wanderers Youth	2021	NPL2 NSW	1	0	-	-	-	-	1	0
Western Sydney Wanderers Youth	Wanderers Youth Total		32	2	0	0	0	0	32	2
Sutherland Sharks (loan)	2019	NPL NSW	1	0	0	0	-	-	1	0
Western Sydney Wanderers	2020–21	A-League	23	0	0	0	-	-	23	0
Western Sydney Wanderers	2021–22	A-League	17	0	0	0	-	-	17	0
Western Sydney Wanderers	Wanderers Total		40	0	0	0	0	0	40	0
Central Coast Mariners	2022–23	A-League	12	0	1	0	-	-	13	0
Newcastle Jets	2022–23	A-League	11	0	0	0	-	-	11	0
Newcastle Jets	2023–24	A-League	16	0	1	0	-	-	17	0
Newcastle Jets	2024–25	A-League	26	2	3	3	-	-	29	5
Newcastle Jets	2025–26	A-League	10	0	4	0	-	-	14	0
Newcastle Jets	2026–27	A-League	0	0	1	0	0	0	1	0
Newcastle Jets	Newcastle Jets Total		63	2	9	3	0	0	72	5
Career Total			147	4	8	3	0	0	155	7

== Honours ==
=== Newcastle Jets FC ===
- 2025 Australia Cup
- 2025–26 A-League Premiers Plate

=== International ===
Australia U20

- AFF U-19 Youth Championship: 2019

Australia U17
- AFF U-16 Youth Championship: 2016

=== Individual ===
- Newcastle Jets A-League Men's Player of the Year: 2024–25
