= Daniel Stynes =

Australian soccer player

Personal information
- Full name: Daniel Stynes
- Date of birth: 29 August 1998 (age 28)
- Place of birth: Australia
- Height: 1.82 m (6 ft 0 in)
- Positions: Attacking midfielder; winger

Team information
- Current team: Bayswater City SC
- Number: 24

Youth career
- 2015–2019: Perth Glory

Senior career*
Years	Team	Apps	(Gls)
2015–2019	Perth Glory NPL	73	(28)
2017–2018	Perth Glory	0	(0)
2019	Bentleigh Greens	13	(3)
2020	Gwelup Croatia	14	(7)
2020–2022	Perth Glory	36	(4)
2022–2024	Newcastle Jets	30	(1)
2025	Galway United	0	(0)
2025–	Ekenäs IF	20	(1)
- * Club domestic league appearances and goals as of 23 November 2025 ‡ National team caps and goals as of 7 August 2018

Daniel Stynes (born 29 August 1998) is an Australian professional footballer who plays as an attacking midfielder or winger for Ykkösliiga club Ekenäs IF. He made his senior debut for Perth Glory as an 18 year old against Heidelberg United on 1 August 2017 in the FFA cup. He made his starting professional debut for Perth Glory on 7 August 2018 in an FFA Cup match against Melbourne Victory.

== Club career ==
=== Perth Glory ===
Stynes was a member of the youth team for 3 seasons where he won the Dylan Tombides young player of the year award as well as making his debut against Heidelberg in the FFA cup. Stynes also signed his first professional contract for the 2017/18 season however tore his hamstring a day after and didn't feature at all again that season. Stynes returned in his starting debut against Melbourne Victory however was forced off due to a challenge that ruled him out for most of the 2018/19 season.

=== Bentleigh Greens ===
In June 2019, Stynes joined Bentleigh Greens in the National Premier Leagues Victoria.

=== Return to Perth ===
In November 2020, Stynes was selected as part of the 2020 Asian Champions League squad which played out the remaining games, which were originally postponed due the COVID-19 pandemic, in Qatar. His first goal for Glory came during a group stage game against Ulsan Hyundai, in which he was in the starting line-up.

=== Galway United ===
On 12 January 2025, Stynes signed for League of Ireland Premier Division club Galway United. On 2 April 2025, it was announced that he had left the club without having made an appearance.

=== Ekenäs IF ===
On 2 April 2025, Finnish Ykkösliiga club EIF announced the signing of Stynes for the 2025 season. Stynes scored 2 goals in his first official game for the club in the Suomen cup.

=== Bayswater City SC ===
Stynes signed for Bayswater City and scored in his first official game against Balcatta.
