= List of Sydney FC players (25–99 appearances) =

Sydney Football Club, an association football club based in Moore Park, Sydney, was founded in 2004. They became the first Sydney member admitted into A-League in 2005. The club's first team have competed in numerous nationally and internationally organised competitions, and all players who have played between 25 and 99 such matches, either as a member of the starting eleven or as a substitute, are listed below.

Each player's details include the duration of his Sydney FC career, his typical playing position while with the club, and the number of games played and goals scored in all senior competitive matches.

== Key ==
- The list is ordered first by date of debut, and then if necessary in alphabetical order.
- Appearances as a substitute are included.
- Statistics are correct up to and including the match played on 13 December 2025. Where a player left the club permanently after this date, his statistics are updated to his date of leaving.

Nationality
Unless otherwise noted, the nationality of a player is determined by the country/countries which he has played for, or if said person has not played international football, their country of birth.
Position
Playing positions are listed according to the tactical formations that were employed at the time.
Club career
Club career is defined as the first and last calendar years in which the player appeared for the club in any of the competitions listed below.
Total appearances and Total goals
Total appearances and goals comprise those in the A-League Men, Australia Cup, AFC Champions League, AFC Champions League Two, Oceania Club Championship, A-League Pre-Season Challenge Cup, FIFA Club World Cup and the Pan-Pacific Championship

== Players ==
Dwight Yorke played 27 games for Sydney FC, scoring nine goals.

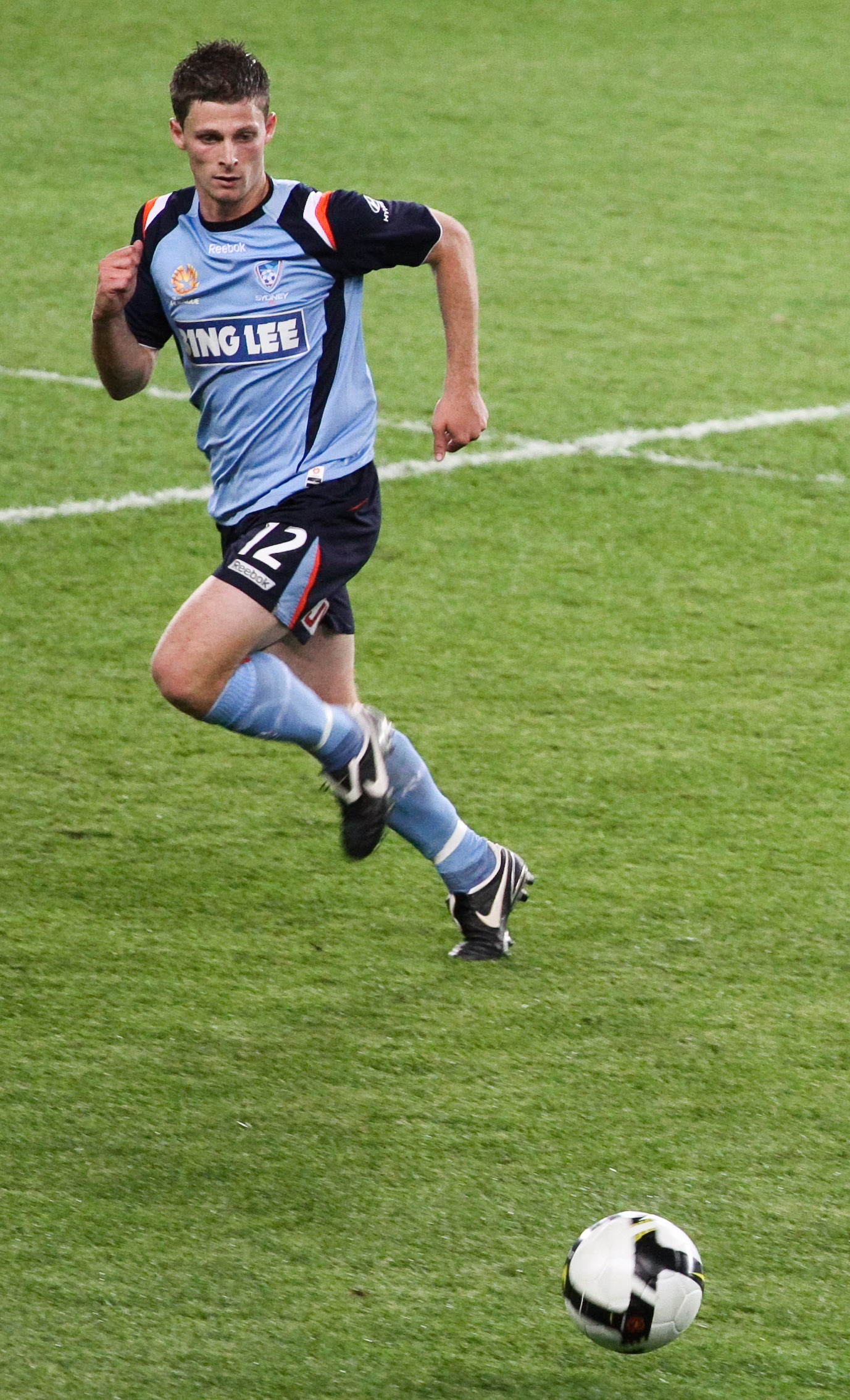
Shannon Cole has started 77 times from 2007 and 2008.

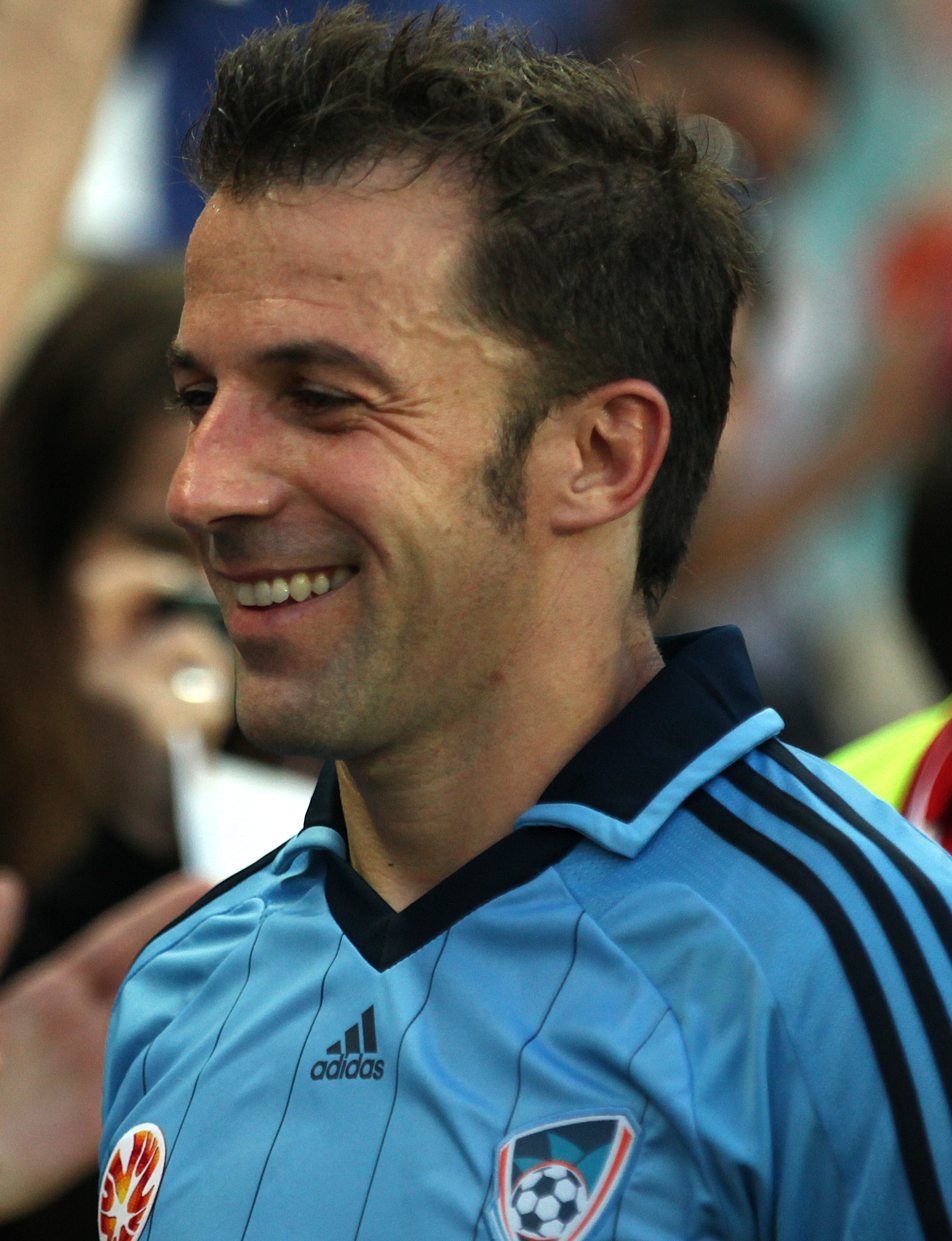
Alessandro Del Piero scored 24 goals in 48 matches in two seasons.

Players highlighted in bold are still actively playing at Sydney FC.

As of 26 April 2026

List of Sydney FC players with between 25 and 99 appearances
Player	Nationality	Pos	Club career	Starts	Subs	Total	Goals
Player	Nationality	Pos	Club career	Appearances			Goals
Matthew Bingley	Australia	MF	2005–2006	28	9	37	2
Alvin Ceccoli	Australia	DF	2005–2007	61	0	61	3
Robbie Middleby	Australia	MF	2005–2009	70	25	90	4
Mark Milligan	Australia	MF	2005–2008	58	0	58	1
Andrew Packer	Australia	DF	2005–2006	26	8	34	3
Sasho Petrovski	Australia	FW	2005–2007	45	16	61	26
Ufuk Talay	Australia	MF	2005–2008	76	9	85	11
Jacob Timpano	Australia	DF	2005–2009	29	8	37	8
David Zdrilic	Australia	FW	2005–2008	48	29	77	14
Marko Rudan	Australia	DF	2005–2007	62	9	71	6
Dwight Yorke	Trinidad and Tobago	FW	2005–2006	25	2	27	9
Ruben Zadkovich	Australia	MF	2006–2008	33	14	47	3
Nikolai Topor-Stanley	Australia	DF	2006–2007	23	3	26	1
Brendon Santalab	Australia	FW	2007–2008	14	14	28	4
Tony Popovic	Australia	DF	2007–2008	31	2	33	1
Shannon Cole	Australia	FW	2007–2012	77	22	99	3
Ivan Necevski	Australia	GK	2007–2015; 2015–2016	47	2	49	0
Simon Colosimo	Australia	DF	2008–2010	35	1	36	0
Mark Bridge	Australia	FW	2008–2012	72	13	85	1
Stuart Musialik	Australia	MF	2008–2011	72	3	75	4
John Aloisi	Australia	FW	2008–2011	26	14	40	12
Brendan Gan	Malaysia	MF	2008–2011	18	23	41	5
Kofi Danning	Australia	FW	2009–2011	8	19	27	3
Byun Sung-hwan	South Korea	DF	2009–2011	55	2	57	0
Stephan Keller	Switzerland	DF	2009–2011	56	2	58	1
Karol Kisel	Slovakia	DF	2009–2010; 2011–2012	52	0	52	0
Hayden Foxe	Australia	DF	2010–2011	14	11	25	0
Nick Carle	Australia	MF	2010–2015	63	7	70	9
Scott Jamieson	Australia	DF	2010–2012	50	4	54	1
Liam Reddy	Australia	GK	2010–2012	43	0	43	0
Hirofumi Moriyasu	Japan	DF	2011–2012	33	9	42	2
Terry Antonis	Australia	MF	2010–2015	51	21	72	5
Bruno Cazarine	Brazil	FW	2010–2012	45	11	45	20
Dimitri Petratos	Australia	MF	2010–2012	18	16	34	5
Joel Chianese	Australia	FW	2011–2014	24	17	41	11
Michael Beauchamp	Australia	DF	2011–2012	28	0	28	1
Pascal Bosschaart	Netherlands	DF	2011–2013	33	0	33	1
Brett Emerton	Australia	MF	2011–2014	54	3	57	7
Ali Abbas	Iraq	FW	2012–2016	63	12	75	8
Alessandro Del Piero	Italy	FW	2012–2014	46	2	48	24
Yairo Yau	Panama	FW	2012–2014	11	15	26	6
Peter Triantis	Australia	MF	2012–2015	17	8	25	1
Aaron Calver	Australia	DF	2012–2019	48	17	65	3
Chris Naumoff	Australia	FW	2013–2016	36	19	55	5
Nikola Petković	Serbia	DF	2013–2015	57	0	57	0
Miloš Dimitrijević	Serbia	MF	2014–2017	71	15	86	4
Alex Gersbach	Australia	DF	2014–2016	26	8	34	0
Bernie Ibini-Isei	Australia	FW	2014–2015; 2016–2017	31	20	51	11
Shane Smeltz	New Zealand	FW	2014–2016	26	26	52	13
George Blackwood	Australia	FW	2014–2017	15	11	26	1
Marc Janko	Austria	FW	2014–2015	24	1	25	16
Max Burgess	Australia	MF	2014; 2016; 2021–2025	56	41	97	9
Jacques Faty	Senegal	DF	2015–2016	27	3	30	2
Mickaël Tavares	Senegal	MF	2015–2016	32	6	38	1
Matt Simon	Australia	FW	2015–2018	23	65	88	10
Filip Hološko	Slovakia	FW	2015–2017	55	1	56	19
Danny Vukovic	Australia	GK	2016–2017	33	0	33	0
Jordy Buijs	Netherlands	DF	2016–2018	45	0	45	3
Adrian Mierzejewski	Poland	FW	2017–2018	31	3	34	15
Luke Wilkshire	Australia	DF	2017–2018	33	0	33	2
Daniel De Silva	Australia	FW	2018–2019	8	17	25	3
Ben Warland	Australia	DF	2018–2022	40	18	58	1
Trent Buhagiar	Malta	FW	2018–2022	35	39	74	21
Luke Ivanovic	Australia	FW	2018–2021	6	41	47	2
Kosta Barbarouses	New Zealand	FW	2019–2022	69	8	77	18
Alexander Baumjohann	Germany	MF	2019–2021	39	21	60	2
Ryan McGowan	Australia	DF	2019–2021	52	1	53	1
Harry Van Der Saag	Australia	DF	2019–2022	13	34	47	3
Callum Talbot	Australia	DF	2021–2022	18	7	25	0
Patrick Yazbek	Australia	MF	2021–2023	31	22	53	1
James Donachie	Australia	DF	2021–2023	44	2	46	2
**Corey Hollman**	Australia	MF	2021–	47	24	71	0
Adrian Segecic	Australia	MF	2021–2025	26	38	64	21
Diego Caballo	Spain	DF	2022–2023	26	2	28	2
Jake Girdwood-Reich	Australia	MF	2022–2024	31	14	45	1
**Aaron Gurd**	Australia	DF	2022–	16	12	28	1
Jaiden Kucharski	Australia	FW	2022–2025	14	61	75	9
Róbert Mak	Slovakia	FW	2022–2024	53	6	59	22
Jack Rodwell	England	MF	2022–2024	20	5	25	2
**Jordan Courtney-Perkins**	Australia	DF	2023–	58	19	77	7
Fábio Gomes	Brazil	FW	2023–2024	20	10	30	13
Gabriel Lacerda	Brazil	DF	2023–2024	21	5	26	0
Patryk Klimala	Poland	FW	2024–2025	29	2	31	17
Hayden Matthews	Australia	DF	2024–2025	33	3	36	0
Anas Ouahim	Morocco	MF	2024–2025	23	10	33	7
Léo Sena	Brazil	MF	2024–2025	31	0	31	1
Douglas Costa	Brazil	FW	2024–2025	20	5	25	6
**Harrison Devenish-Meares**	Australia	GK	2024–	55	0	55	0
**Alexandar Popovic**	Australia	DF	2024–	34	10	44	3
**Tiago Quintal**	Australia	FW	2024–	17	32	49	6
**Wataru Kamijo**	Australia	MF	2024–	14	12	26	0
**Alex Grant**	Australia	DF	2025–	29	2	31	2
**Paul Okon-Engstler**	Australia	MF	2025–	25	1	26	0
**Piero Quispe**	Peru	MF	2025–	24	2	26	1
