= 2024–25 A-League Men =

48th season of top-tier soccer league in Australia

A-League Men
- Season: 2024–25
- Dates: 18 October 2024 – 31 May 2025
- Champions: Melbourne City (2nd title)
- Premiers: Auckland FC (1st title)
- AFC Champions League Elite: Melbourne City
- AFC Champions League Two: Macarthur FC
- Matches: 176
- Goals: 573 (3.26 per match)
- Top goalscorer: Archie Goodwin; Adrian Segecic (13 goals)
- Best goalkeeper: Alex Paulsen
- Biggest home win: Newcastle Jets 6–0 Central Coast Mariners (12 April 2025)
- Biggest away win: Perth Glory 0–5 Melbourne City (10 November 2024)
- Highest scoring: Adelaide United 4–5 Macarthur FC (14 March 2025)
- Longest winning run: 6 matches Auckland FC
- Longest unbeaten run: 14 matches Auckland FC
- Longest winless run: 12 matches Brisbane Roar
- Longest losing run: 5 matches Brisbane Roar
- Highest attendance: 32,741; Sydney FC 3–3 Western Sydney Wanderers (8 February 2025)
- Lowest attendance: 2,425; Perth Glory 1–3 Western United (22 November 2024)
- Total attendance: 1,590,618
- Average attendance: 9,038 ( 480)
- All statistics correct as of 31 May 2025.

The 2024–25 A-League Men, known as the Isuzu UTE A-League for sponsorship reasons, was the 48th season of national level men's soccer in Australia, and the 20th since the establishment of the competition as the A-League in 2004. Central Coast Mariners were the defending premiers and champions.

The 2024–25 A-League Men season saw the league's average attendance increase for the third consecutive season, the first time this has occurred since 2013–14.

== Clubs ==

=== Stadiums and locations ===
Thirteen clubs are participating in the 2024–25 season. This is an increase from the previous years after Auckland FC joined the league.

Note: Table lists in alphabetical order.

Club	City	Home ground	Capacity
Adelaide United	Adelaide	Coopers Stadium	16,500
Auckland FC	Auckland	Go Media Stadium	25,000
Brisbane Roar	Brisbane	Suncorp Stadium	52,500
Central Coast Mariners	Gosford	Industree Group Stadium	20,059
Macarthur FC	Sydney	Campbelltown Sports Stadium	17,500
Melbourne City	Melbourne	AAMI Park	30,050
Melbourne Victory	Melbourne	AAMI Park	30,050
Newcastle Jets	Newcastle	McDonald Jones Stadium	30,000
Perth Glory	Perth	HBF Park	20,500
Sydney FC	Sydney	Allianz Stadium	42,500
Wellington Phoenix	Wellington	Sky Stadium	34,500
Wellington Phoenix	Christchurch	Apollo Projects Stadium	17,104
Western Sydney Wanderers	Sydney	CommBank Stadium	30,000
Western United	Melbourne	Ironbark Fields	5,000
Western United	Melbourne	AAMI Park	30,050

=== Personnel and kits ===
Team	Manager	Captain	Kit manufacturer	Kit sponsor
Adelaide United	(Australia) Carl Veart	(Australia) Ryan Kitto	UCAN	Flinders University; CG FinTech (Note: Away kit)
Auckland FC	(Australia) Steve Corica	(Japan) Hiroki Sakai	New Balance	Anchor; Go Media
Brisbane Roar	(Australia) Ruben Zadkovich	(Republic of Ireland) Jay O'Shea	Cikers	OutKast
Central Coast Mariners	(England) Mark Jackson	(Australia) Trent Sainsbury	Cikers	polytec
Macarthur FC	(Australia) Mile Sterjovski	(Australia) Luke Brattan	Kelme	SipEnergy
Melbourne City	(Australia) Aurelio Vidmar	(Australia) Aziz Behich	Puma	Etihad Airways
Melbourne Victory	(Australia) Arthur Diles	(Portugal) Roderick Miranda	Macron	Turkish Airlines
Newcastle Jets	(Australia) Robert Stanton	(Australia) Kosta Grozos	Legend Sportswear	Brydens Lawyers
Perth Glory	(Australia) David Zdrilic	(Australia) Adam Taggart	Macron	La Vida Homes
Sydney FC	(Australia) Ufuk Talay	(Australia) Rhyan Grant	Under Armour	Macquarie University
Wellington Phoenix	(Australia) Giancarlo Italiano	(New Zealand) Alex Rufer	Paladin Sports	Oppo; Entelar Group
Western Sydney Wanderers	(Australia) Alen Stajcic	(Australia) Lawrence Thomas	Adidas	Voltaren; Turner Freeman Lawyers
Western United	(Australia) John Aloisi	(Australia) Ben Garuccio	Kappa	Sharp

=== Managerial changes ===
Team	Outgoing manager	Manner of departure	Date of vacancy	Position on table	Incoming manager	Date of appointment
Auckland FC	Inaugural			Pre-season	(Australia) Steve Corica	20 December 2023
Melbourne City	(Australia) Aurelio Vidmar (caretaker)	Promoted to full-time	—N/a	Pre-season	(Australia) Aurelio Vidmar	15 May 2024
Western Sydney Wanderers	(Australia) Marko Rudan	Mutual consent	16 May 2024	Pre-season	(Australia) Alen Stajcic	25 June 2024
Melbourne Victory	(Australia) Tony Popovic	End of contract	12 June 2024	Pre-season	(Australia) Patrick Kisnorbo	25 June 2024
Perth Glory	(Australia) Alen Stajcic	Mutual consent	25 June 2024	Pre-season	(Australia) David Zdrilic	28 June 2024
Melbourne Victory	(Australia) Patrick Kisnorbo	Signed by Yokohama F. Marinos as assistant coach	17 December 2024	3rd	(Australia) Arthur Diles (caretaker)	17 December 2024
Melbourne Victory	(Australia) Arthur Diles (caretaker)	Promoted to full-time	N/A	6th	(Australia) Arthur Diles	31 January 2025

=== Foreign players ===
Club	Visa 1	Visa 2	Visa 3	Visa 4	Visa 5	Non-visa foreigner(s)	Former player(s)
Adelaide United	(England) Zach Clough	(England) Ryan Tunnicliffe	(Netherlands) Bart Vriends	(Spain) Javi López		(Lebanon) Austin Ayoubi^{2} (Spain) Isaías Sánchez^{1}	
Auckland FC	(Belgium) Louis Verstraete	(Chile) Felipe Gallegos	(Colombia) Neyder Moreno	(Japan) Hiroki Sakai	(Uruguay) Guillermo May	(Fiji) Dan Hall^{2}	
Brisbane Roar	(France) Florin Berenguer	(Indonesia) Rafael Struick	(Republic of Ireland) Jay O'Shea	(Lebanon) Walid Shour	(Portugal) Asumah Abubakar	(Sri Lanka) Jack Hingert^{2} (United States) Marcus Ferkranus^{2}	(Ecuador) Néicer Acosta
Central Coast Mariners	(Brazil) Mikael Doka	(Brazil) Vitor Feijão	(England) Ryan Edmondson	(Northern Ireland) Alfie McCalmont	(Vanuatu) Brian Kaltak	(Kenya) William Wilson^{2} (Malta) Lucas Scicluna^{2} (New Zealand) Storm Roux^{2}	
Macarthur FC	(Ivory Coast) Kévin Boli	(Poland) Filip Kurto	(Tunisia) Saîf-Eddine Khaoui			(Croatia) Marin Jakoliš^{2}	(Belgium) Dino Arslanagić (France) Valère Germain
Melbourne City	(Argentina) Germán Ferreyra	(Austria) Andreas Kuen	(France) Samuel Souprayen	(Israel) Yonatan Cohen			(England) Jamie Young^{2}
Melbourne Victory	(Brazil) Clarismario Santos	(France) Zinédine Machach	(Greece) Nikos Vergos	(Portugal) Roderick Miranda		(Ivory Coast) Adama Traoré^{1}	
Newcastle Jets	(Brazil) Wellissol	(Japan) Kota Mizunuma				(New Zealand) Lachlan Bayliss^{2} (New Zealand) Dane Ingham^{2} (Tanzania) Charles M'Mombwa^{2}	
Perth Glory	(Belgium) Anas Hamzaoui	(England) Luke Amos	(Japan) Hiroaki Aoyama	(Japan) Yuto Misao	(Japan) Takuya Okamoto	(New Zealand) Oliver Sail^{2}	(Colombia) Cristian Caicedo (Ecuador) Luis Cangá (South Sudan) Joel Anasmo^{2}
Sydney FC	(Brazil) Douglas Costa	(Brazil) Léo Sena	(England) Joe Lolley	(Morocco) Anas Ouahim	(Poland) Patryk Klimala		
Wellington Phoenix	(England) Josh Oluwayemi	(England) Scott Wootton	(Japan) Hideki Ishige	(Japan) Kazuki Nagasawa	(Portugal) Francisco Geraldes	(North Macedonia) Stefan Colakovski^{2}	(England) David Ball (Iraq) Mohamed Al-Taay^{2}
Western Sydney Wanderers	(Bulgaria) Bozhidar Kraev	(South Korea) Jeong Tae-wook	(Spain) Juan Mata	(Sweden) Marcus Antonsson		(Iraq) Mohamed Al-Taay^{2} (Malta) Dylan Scicluna^{2}	
Western United	(Japan) Riku Danzaki	(Japan) Hiroshi Ibusuki	(Japan) Tomoki Imai			(Iraq) Charbel Shamoon^{2} (Lebanon) Khoder Kaddour^{2} (New Zealand) Luka Coveny^{2}	

The following do not fill a Visa position:
^{1}Those players who were born and started their professional career abroad but have since gained Australian citizenship (or New Zealand citizenship, in the case of Auckland FC and/or Wellington Phoenix);
^{2}Australian citizens (or New Zealand citizens, in the case of Auckland FC and/or Wellington Phoenix) who have chosen to represent another national team;
^{3}Injury replacement players, or National team replacement players;
^{4}Guest players (eligible to play a maximum of fourteen games)

== Regular season ==
The regular season is made up of a full home-and-away 24-match schedule for each club, plus three byes and two extra rounds (including the Unite Round), for a total of 26 matches played. The top six qualify for a finals series.

=== League table ===
Pos	Team	Pld	W	D	L	GF	GA	GD	Pts	Qualification
1	Auckland FC (Note: Auckland FC and Wellington Phoenix cannot qualify for Asian Football Confederation competitions as they are based in New Zealand, which is part of the Oceania Football Confederation.)	26	15	8	3	49	27	+22	53	Qualification for Finals series (Note: The top two teams enter the finals series at the semi-finals, while the teams ranked third to sixth enter the finals series at the elimination-finals.)
2	Melbourne City (C)	26	14	6	6	41	25	+16	48	Qualification for AFC Champions League Elite and Finals series
3	Western United	26	14	5	7	55	37	+18	47	Qualification for Finals series
4	Western Sydney Wanderers	26	13	7	6	58	40	+18	46	Qualification for Finals series
5	Melbourne Victory	26	12	7	7	44	36	+8	43	Qualification for Finals series
6	Adelaide United	26	10	8	8	53	55	−2	38	Qualification for Finals series
7	Sydney FC	26	10	7	9	53	46	+7	37	
8	Macarthur FC	26	9	6	11	50	45	+5	33	Qualification for AFC Champions League Two (Note: Qualified for AFC Champions League Two as the 2024 Australia Cup winners.)
9	Newcastle Jets	26	8	6	12	43	44	−1	30	
10	Central Coast Mariners	26	5	11	10	29	51	−22	26	Qualification for 2025 Australia Cup play-offs
11	Wellington Phoenix	26	6	6	14	27	43	−16	24	Qualification for 2025 Australia Cup play-offs
12	Brisbane Roar	26	5	6	15	32	51	−19	21	Qualification for 2025 Australia Cup play-offs
13	Perth Glory	26	4	5	17	22	56	−34	17	Qualification for 2025 Australia Cup play-offs

Source: A-Leagues
Rules for classification: 1) points; 2) goal difference; 3) goals scored; 4) wins; 5) head-to-head results; 5a) head-to-head points; 5b) head-to-head goal difference; 6) Fair Play points; 7) away goal difference; 8) away goals per match; 9) home goal difference; 10) home goals per match; 11) toss of a coin in an event of a tie of two clubs.
(C) Champions

=== Fixtures and results ===
Home \ Away	ADL	AKL	BRI	CCM	MAC	MCY	MVC	NEW	PER	SYD	WEL	WSW	WUN	ADL	AKL	BRI	CCM	MAC	MCY	MVC	NEW	PER	SYD	WEL	WSW	WUN
Adelaide United		2–2	1–1	1–1	4–5	1–0	3–2	1–2	2–2	3–3	3–2	2–3	2–1										2–3			
Auckland FC	4–4		2–0	2–2	2–1	3–0	0–0	2–0	1–0	1–0	2–0	1–1	0–4											6–1		
Brisbane Roar	2–3	0–2		1–3	1–5	1–4	1–1	0–1	0–1	2–3	1–0	0–1	2–1	1–1												
Central Coast Mariners	0–4	1–4	1–2		2–2	1–1	0–0	2–2	0–0	2–1	0–3	0–4	1–3									3–1				
Macarthur FC	1–2	0–1	4–4	1–1		1–0	1–2	1–2	6–1	0–2	1–2	1–3	2–2								3–3					
Melbourne City	0–0	2–2	1–0	1–0	2–0		1–3	0–1	1–0	5–1	2–0	0–2	2–0			3–2										
Melbourne Victory	5–3	0–2	2–0	3–0	2–1	1–1		1–1	2–0	2–0	1–0	2–2	3–4						2–2							
Newcastle Jets	0–1	1–1	3–1	1–2	1–3	0–1	3–0		2–2	2–2	1–2	0–1	2–6				6–0									
Perth Glory	4–1	1–0	1–3	1–1	0–3	0–5	0–2	0–4		0–0	0–2	1–2	1–3													2–3
Sydney FC	4–1	2–2	3–4	4–1	1–2	2–3	3–0	3–2	3–0		1–1	4–2	3–4												3–3	
Wellington Phoenix	1–2	0–2	1–1	0–0	1–2	0–1	1–0	2–1	0–2	0–0		2–2	1–1							2–3						
Western Sydney Wanderers	3–4	0–1	2–2	1–3	2–3	2–2	4–2	4–1	4–1	1–2	4–1		2–0					2–1								
Western United	3–0	0–2	1–0	2–2	0–0	0–1	1–3	3–1	3–1	1–0	4–1	1–1			4–2											

Source: Aleagues.com.au
Legend: Blue = home team win; Yellow = draw; Red = away team win.
For upcoming matches, an "a" indicates there is an article about the rivalry between the two participants.

== Finals series ==
=== Bracket ===
Elimination finals
4	Western Sydney Wanderers	1
5	Melbourne Victory	2
3	Western United	3
6	Adelaide United	2

Semi-finals
1	Auckland FC	1	0	1
5	Melbourne Victory	0	2	2
2	Melbourne City	3	1	4
3	Western United	0	1	1

Grand Final
2	Melbourne City	1
5	Melbourne Victory	0

=== Elimination finals ===
9 May 2025
19:35 AEST (UTC+10:00)

Western United	3–2	Adelaide United
Botic 20', 31', 62'	Report	Jovanovic 3'; Mauk 79'

Ironbark Fields, Melbourne
Attendance: 3,078
Referee: Alex King

10 May 2025
19:35 AEST (UTC+10:00)

Western Sydney Wanderers	1–2	Melbourne Victory
Sapsford 23'	Report	Bos 7'; Machach 42'

CommBank Stadium, Sydney
Attendance: 16,399
Referee: Adam Kersey

=== Semi-finals ===
==== Summary ====
Team 1	Agg.	Team 2	1st leg	2nd leg
Auckland FC	1–2	Melbourne Victory	1–0	0–2
Melbourne City	4–1	Western United	3–0	1–1

==== Matches ====
17 May 2025
19:35 AEST (UTC+10:00)

Melbourne Victory	0–1	Auckland FC
	Report	Rogerson 64'

AAMI Park, Melbourne
Attendance: 14,121
Referee: Ben Abraham
24 May 2025
18:00 NZST (UTC+12:00)

Auckland FC	0–2	Melbourne Victory
	Report	Machach 55'; Fornaroli 60'

Go Media Stadium, Auckland
Attendance: 29,148
Referee: Alex King

Melbourne Victory won 2–1 on aggregate.

16 May 2025
19:35 AEST (UTC+10:00)

Western United	0–3	Melbourne City
	Report	Ferreyra 16'; Cohen 54'; Leckie 72'

AAMI Park, Melbourne
Attendance: 5,186
Referee: Shaun Evans
24 May 2025
19:35 AEST (UTC+10:00)

Melbourne City	1–1	Western United
Behich 20'	Report	Botic 66'

AAMI Park, Melbourne
Attendance: 7,691
Referee: Adam Kersey

Melbourne City won 4–1 on aggregate.

=== Grand Final ===
31 May 2025
19:40 AEST (UTC+10:00)

Melbourne City	1–0	Melbourne Victory
Cohen 10'	Report

AAMI Park, Melbourne
Attendance: 29,902
Referee: Adam Kersey (Queensland)

== Regular season statistics ==
=== Top scorers ===
As of end of regular season

Rank	Player	Club	Goals
1	(Australia) Archie Goodwin	Adelaide United	13
1	(Australia) Adrian Segecic	Sydney FC	13
3	(Australia) Noah Botic	Western United	12
3	(Australia) Nicolas Milanovic	Western Sydney Wanderers	12
5	(Poland) Patryk Klimala	Sydney FC	11
6	(New Zealand) Kosta Barbarouses	Wellington Phoenix	10
6	(Japan) Hiroshi Ibusuki	Western United	10
6	(Croatia) Marin Jakoliš	Macarthur FC	10
6	(Australia) Adam Taggart	Perth Glory	10
10	(Australia) Eli Adams	Newcastle Jets	9
10	(England) Joe Lolley	Sydney FC	9
10	(Uruguay) Guillermo May	Auckland FC	9

=== Hat-tricks ===
Player	For	Against	Result	Date	Ref.
(Australia) Nicolas Milanovic	Western Sydney Wanderers	Newcastle Jets	4–1 (H)	8 November 2024	
(England) Joe Lolley	Sydney FC	Perth Glory	3–0 (H)	8 January 2025	
(Australia) Adrian Segecic	Sydney FC	Central Coast Mariners	4–1 (H)	11 January 2025	
(New Zealand) Logan Rogerson	Auckland FC	Wellington Phoenix	6–1 (H)	22 February 2025	
(Croatia) Marin Jakoliš	Macarthur FC	Brisbane Roar	5–1 (A)	4 April 2025	
(Australia) Noah Botic	Western United	Adelaide United	3–2 (H)	9 May 2025	

Key
(H)	Home team
(A)	Away team

=== Clean sheets ===
As of end of regular season

Rank	Goalkeeper	Club	Clean sheets
1	(New Zealand) Alex Paulsen	Auckland FC	12
2	(Australia) Patrick Beach	Melbourne City	11
3	(Australia) Harrison Devenish-Meares	Sydney FC	5
3	(Australia) Matt Sutton	Western United	5
3	(Australia) Lawrence Thomas	Western Sydney Wanderers	5
6	(Australia) Jack Duncan	Melbourne Victory	4
6	(Australia) Mitchell Langerak	Melbourne Victory	4
6	(New Zealand) Oliver Sail	Perth Glory	4
9	(Poland) Filip Kurto	Macarthur FC	3
9	(Nigeria) Josh Oluwayemi	Wellington Phoenix	3
9	(Australia) Dylan Peraić-Cullen	Central Coast Mariners	3
9	(Australia) Ryan Scott	Newcastle Jets	3

== Awards ==
=== Annual awards ===
Award	Winner	Club	Ref.
Johnny Warren Medal	(Australia) Nicolas Milanovic	Western Sydney Wanderers	
Young Footballer of the Year	(Australia) Archie Goodwin	Adelaide United	
Golden Boot Award	(Australia) Archie Goodwin (Australia) Adrian Segecic	Adelaide United; Sydney FC	
Goalkeeper of the Year	(New Zealand) Alex Paulsen	Auckland FC	
Goal of the Year	(Australia) Jordan Lauton	Western United	
Save of the Year	(New Zealand) Alex Paulsen	Auckland FC	
Playmaker of the Year	(Australia) Zac Sapsford	Western Sydney Wanderers FC	
Fan Player of the Year	(New Zealand) Francis de Vries	Auckland FC	
Coach of the Year	(Australia) Steve Corica	Auckland FC	
Fair Play Award	Adelaide United		
Referee of the Year	(Australia) Adam Kersey	—N/a	

=== Club awards ===
Club	Player of the Season	Ref.
Adelaide United	(Australia) Ethan Alagich	
Auckland FC	(Uruguay) Guillermo May	
Brisbane Roar	(Republic of Ireland) Jay O'Shea	
Central Coast Mariners	(Brazil) Mikael Doka	
Macarthur FC	(Australia) Kealey Adamson	
Melbourne City	(Australia) Kai Trewin	
Melbourne Victory	(Australia) Jordi Valadon	
Newcastle Jets	(Australia) Thomas Aquilina	
Perth Glory	(Australia) Adam Taggart	
Sydney FC	(Australia) Adrian Segecic	
Wellington Phoenix	(New Zealand) Kosta Barbarouses	
Western Sydney Wanderers	(Australia) Nicolas Milanovic	
Western United	(Australia) Angus Thurgate	

=== Team of the season ===
Goalkeeper	Defenders	Midfielders	Forwards	Substitutes
(New Zealand) Alex Paulsen (Auckland FC)	(Japan) Hiroki Sakai (Auckland FC) (Australia) Nathaniel Atkinson (Melbourne City) (Australia) Kai Trewin (Melbourne City) (New Zealand) Francis de Vries (Auckland FC)	(Belgium) Louis Verstraete (Auckland FC) (Australia) Ryan Teague (Melbourne Victory) (Australia) Angus Thurgate (Western United)	(Australia) Nicolas Milanovic (Western Sydney Wanderers) (Australia) Archie Goodwin (Adelaide United) (Australia) Adrian Segecic (Sydney FC)	(Australia) Lawrence Thomas (Western Sydney Wanderers) (Australia) Aziz Behich (Melbourne City) (New Zealand) Nando Pijnaker (Auckland FC) (Australia) Anthony Caceres (Sydney FC) (Australia) Marco Tilio (Melbourne City) (Australia) Noah Botic (Western United) (Uruguay) Guillermo May (Auckland FC)

== Attendances ==
A-League clubs listed by average home league attendance:

Pos	Club	Average attendance
1	Auckland FC	18,101
2	Sydney FC	15,290
3	Melbourne Victory	12,778
4	Adelaide United	10,575
5	Western Sydney Wanderers	9,809
6	Wellington Phoenix	8,366
7	Newcastle Jets	6,608
8	Perth Glory	6,396
9	Central Coast Mariners	6,392
10	Melbourne City	6,192
11	Brisbane Roar	5,463
12	Macarthur FC	4,662
13	Western United	3,644

== See also ==
- 2024–25 A-League Women
- 2025 A-League Men finals series
- 2025 A-League Men grand final
- 2024–25 Adelaide United FC season
- 2024–25 Auckland FC season
- 2024–25 Brisbane Roar FC season
- 2024–25 Central Coast Mariners FC season
- 2024–25 Macarthur FC season
- 2024–25 Melbourne City FC season
- 2024–25 Melbourne Victory FC season
- 2024–25 Newcastle Jets FC season
- 2024–25 Perth Glory FC season
- 2024–25 Sydney FC season
- 2024–25 Wellington Phoenix FC season
- 2024–25 Western Sydney Wanderers FC season
- 2024–25 Western United FC season
