= 2024–25 Melbourne Victory FC season =

Melbourne Victory
2024–25 season
- Chairman: John Dovaston
- Head Coach: Patrick Kisnorbo (to 17 December 2024); Arthur Diles (from 17 December 2024)
- Stadium: AAMI Park
- A-League Men: 5th
- A-League Men Finals: Runners-up
- Australia Cup: Runners-up
- Top goalscorer: League: Nishan Velupillay; Nikos Vergos (7); All: Nishan Velupillay (12)
- Highest home attendance: 24,053 vs. Melbourne City (21 December 2024); A League Men
- Lowest home attendance: 5,131 vs. Adelaide United (21 September 2024); Australia Cup
- Average home league attendance: 12,778
- Biggest win: 4–0 vs. NWS Spirit (A) (28 August 2024); Australia Cup; 4–0 vs. Moreton City Excelsior (A) (14 September 2024); Australia Cup
- Biggest defeat: 0–3 vs. Sydney FC (H) (28 December 2024); A-League Men
Home colours	Away colours
- All statistics correct as of 31 May 2025.

Pregame Image of the first leg of Victory's semi final against Auckland FC in the 2025 A-League Finals Series.

The 2024–25 season was Melbourne Victory Football Club's 20th season in the A-League Men. In addition to the domestic league, Melbourne Victory participated in this season's edition of the Australia Cup.

== Players ==
=== First-team squad ===
Note: Flags indicate national team as defined under FIFA eligibility rules; some limited exceptions apply. Players may hold more than one non-FIFA nationality.

No.	Pos.	Nation	Player
1	GK	AUS	Mitchell Langerak
3	DF	CIV	Adama Traoré
4	DF	AUS	Lachlan Jackson
5	DF	AUS	Brendan Hamill
6	MF	AUS	Ryan Teague
7	FW	AUS	Daniel Arzani
8	MF	FRA	Zinédine Machach
9	FW	GRE	Nikos Vergos
10	FW	AUS	Bruno Fornaroli
11	FW	BRA	Santos
14	MF	AUS	Jordi Valadon
16	DF	AUS	Joshua Inserra (scholarship)
17	FW	AUS	Nishan Velupillay

No.	Pos.	Nation	Player
18	MF	AUS	Fabian Monge
19	FW	AUS	Jing Reec
21	DF	POR	Roderick Miranda (captain)
22	DF	AUS	Joshua Rawlins
23	MF	AUS	Alexander Badolato (on loan from Western Sydney Wanderers)
24	MF	AUS	Alexander Menelaou (scholarship)
25	GK	AUS	Jack Duncan
26	MF	AUS	Luka Kolić (scholarship)
27	MF	AUS	Reno Piscopo
28	DF	AUS	Kasey Bos
30	GK	AUS	Daniel Graskoski (scholarship)
40	GK	AUS	Christian Siciliano

== Transfers and contracts ==
=== Transfers in ===
No.	Position	Player	Transferred from	Type/fee	Contract length	Date	Ref.
22	DF	Joshua Rawlins	(Netherlands) Jong Utrecht	Free transfer	2 years	28 June 2024	
19	FW	Jing Reec	(Denmark) AGF	Free transfer	3 years	3 July 2024	
27	MF	Reno Piscopo	Unattached	Free transfer	2 years	5 July 2024	
25	GK	Jack Duncan	Wellington Phoenix	Free transfer	1 year	8 July 2024	
5	DF	Brendan Hamill	(India) Mohun Bagan	Free transfer	2 years	10 July 2024	
1	GK	Mitchell Langerak	(Japan) Nagoya Grampus	Free transfer	1.5 years	16 January 2025	
9	FW	(Greece) Nikos Vergos	(Greece) Atromitos	Free transfer	2 years	8 August 2024	
11	FW	(Brazil) Santos	(Cyprus) AEK Larnaca	Free transfer	1 year	10 October 2024	
4	DF	Lachlan Jackson	Unattached	Free transfer	1.5 years	29 January 2025	
23	MF	Alexander Badolato	Western Sydney Wanderers	Loan	5 months	13 February 2025	

==== From youth squad ====
No.	Position	Player	Age	Notes	Ref
24	MF	Alex Menelaou	20	1-year scholarship contract	
26	MF	Luka Kolić	19	1-year scholarship contract	
30	GK	Daniel Graskoski	17	1-year scholarship contract	

=== Transfers out ===
No.	Position	Player	Transferred to	Type/fee	Date	Ref
6	MF	Leigh Broxham	Retired		3 May 2023	
7	FW	Chris Ikonomidis	Unattached	End of contract	31 May 2024	
16	DF	Stefan Nigro	Unattached	End of contract	31 May 2024	
22	MF	Jake Brimmer	Unattached	End of contract	31 May 2024	
23	MF	(Tunisia) Salim Khelifi	Perth Glory	End of loan	31 May 2024	
24	MF	Eli Adams	Unattached	End of contract	31 May 2024	
30	GK	Ahmad Taleb	Unattached	End of contract	31 May 2024	
5	DF	(France) Damien Da Silva	Unattached	End of contract	19 June 2024	
14	DF	Connor Chapman	(South Korea) Gimpo	Undisclosed	19 June 2024	
20	GK	Paul Izzo	(Denmark) Randers	Undisclosed	9 July 2024	
15	DF	(North Macedonia) Matthew Bozinovski	Unattached	End of contract	7 August 2024	
28	MF	(Curaçao) Roly Bonevacia	Unattached	End of contract	13 August 2024	
11	FW	Ben Folami	Adelaide United	Mutual contract termination	17 September 2024	
2	DF	Jason Geria	(Japan) Albirex Niigata	Undisclosed	10 January 2025	

=== Contract extensions ===
No.	Position	Player	Duration	Date	Notes	Ref
2	DF	Jason Geria	2 years	9 July 2024		
14	MF	Jordi Valadon	2 years	18 February 2025	Contract extended from end of 2024–25 to end of 2026–27.	
28	DF	Kasey Bos	2 years	18 February 2025	Contract extended from end of 2024–25 to end of 2026–27.	

== Pre-season and friendlies ==
Win Draw Loss

31 July 2024	Green Gully (Australia)	2–6	(Australia) Melbourne Victory	Melbourne
19:30 AEST	? 23'; ? 53'	Report	Fornaroli 5', 43'; Velupillay 45+2'; Reec 61', 88'; Mihailidis 90+2'	Stadium: Green Gully Reserve

14 August 2024	Altona Magic (Australia)	0–2	(Australia) Melbourne Victory	Melbourne
19:30 AEST		Report	Velupillay 7'; Piscopo 17'	Stadium: Paisley Park

7 September 2024	Goulburn Valley Suns (Australia)	0–3	(Australia) Melbourne Victory	Shepparton
18:30 AEST		Report	Fornaroli 8', 36'; Reec 86'	Stadium: Shepparton Sports City

11 October 2024	Western United (Australia)	3–1	(Australia) Melbourne Victory	Melbourne
	Walatee ?'; Danzaki ?', ?'	Report	Teague ?'	Stadium: Ironbark Fields; Attendance: 0 (behind closed doors)

== Competitions ==
=== Overall record ===
Competition	First match	Last match	Starting round	Final position	Record							
Competition	First match	Last match	Starting round	Final position	Pld	W	D	L	GF	GA	GD	Win %
A League Men	18 October 2024	4 May 2025	Matchday 1	5th Place	26	12	7	7	44	36	+8	46.15
A League Men Finals	10 May 2025	31 May 2025	Elimination final	Runners-up	4	2	0	2	4	3	+1	50.00
Australia Cup	6 August 2024	29 September 2024	Round of 32	Runners-up	5	4	0	1	13	2	+11	80.00
Total					35	18	7	10	61	41	+20	51.43

Last updated: 31 May 2025
Source: Competitions

=== A-League Men ===
==== League table ====
Pos	Team	Pld	W	D	L	GF	GA	GD	Pts	Qualification
3	Western United	26	14	5	7	55	37	+18	47	Qualification for Finals series (Note: The top two teams enter the finals series at the semi-finals, while the teams ranked third to sixth enter the finals series at the elimination-finals.)
4	Western Sydney Wanderers	26	13	7	6	58	40	+18	46	Qualification for Finals series
5	Melbourne Victory	26	12	7	7	44	36	+8	43	Qualification for Finals series
6	Adelaide United	26	10	8	8	53	55	−2	38	Qualification for Finals series
7	Sydney FC	26	10	7	9	53	46	+7	37	

Source: A-Leagues
Rules for classification: 1) points; 2) goal difference; 3) goals scored; 4) wins; 5) head-to-head results; 5a) head-to-head points; 5b) head-to-head goal difference; 6) Fair Play points; 7) away goal difference; 8) away goals per match; 9) home goal difference; 10) home goals per match; 11) toss of a coin in an event of a tie of two clubs.

==== Results summary ====
Overall								Home						Away					
Pld	W	D	L	GF	GA	GD	Pts	W	D	L	GF	GA	GD	W	D	L	GF	GA	GD
26	12	8	6	44	36	+8	44	7	4	2	26	16	+10	5	4	4	18	20	−2

Last updated: 4 May 2025.
Source: Ultimate A-League
Away figures include Melbourne Victory's 1–0 loss on neutral ground in Unite Round against Wellington Phoenix on 24 November 2024.

==== Results by round ====
Round	1	2	3	4	5	6	7	8	9	10	11	12	13	14	15	16	17	18	19	20	21	22	23	24	25	26	27	28	29
Ground	A	A	H	H	N	A	H	B	H	A	A	H	H	B	A	H	A	A	H	H	A	H	A	H	B	A	H	A	H
Result	D	W	W	W	L	W	W	X	D	L	D	D	L	X	L	W	W	L	W	D	D	W	L	W	X	W	L	W	D
Position	8	3	2	1	3	2	2	3	3	3	4	3	7	7	7	6	3	6	3	4	6	4	5	5	5	5	5	5	5
Points	1	4	7	10	10	13	16	16	17	17	18	19	19	19	19	22	25	25	28	29	30	33	33	36	36	39	39	42	43

Updated to match(es) played on 4 May 2025. Source: Ultimate A-League
A = Away; H = Home; N = Neutral; B = Bye; W = Win; D = Draw; L = Loss; X = Bye

==== Matches ====
Win Draw Loss Fixtures

18 October 2024 1	Central Coast Mariners	0–0	Melbourne Victory	Gosford
19:35 AEST		Report		Stadium: Industree Group Stadium; Attendance: 6,953; Referee: Alireza Faghani

26 October 2024 2	Melbourne City	1–3	Melbourne Victory	Melbourne
19:35 AEST	Nabbout 64'	Report	Velupillay 5'; Vergos 12'; Teague 25'	Stadium: AAMI Park; Attendance: 20,093; Referee: Alex King

3 November 2024 3	Melbourne Victory	2–1	Macarthur FC	Melbourne
16:00 AEST	Arzani 69' (pen.); Piscopo 75'	Report	Germain 51'	Stadium: AAMI Park; Attendance: 11,087; Referee: Jack Morgan

9 November 2024 4	Melbourne Victory	2–0	Brisbane Roar	Melbourne
17:00 AEST	Velupillay 37'; Geria 76'	Report		Stadium: AAMI Park; Attendance: 11,251; Referee: Tim Danaskos

24 November 2024 5	Wellington Phoenix	1–0	Melbourne Victory	Sydney
13:30 AEST	Barbarouses 82'	Report		Stadium: Allianz Stadium; Attendance: 3,478; Referee: Casey Reibelt

1 November 2024 6	Western United	1–3	Melbourne Victory	Melbourne
16:00 AEST	Botic 19'	Report	Machach 8'; Vergos 48'; Fornaroli 69'	Stadium: AAMI Park; Attendance: 5,263; Referee: Adam Bavcar

8 December 2024 7	Melbourne Victory	2–0	Perth Glory	Melbourne
17:00 AEST	Machach 7'; Traoré 59'	Report		Stadium: AAMI Park; Attendance: 9,742; Referee: Shane Skinner

21 December 2024 9	Melbourne Victory	1–1	Melbourne City	Melbourne
19:35 AEST	Miranda 65'	Report	Cohen 16'	Stadium: AAMI Park; Attendance: 24,053; Referee: Shaun Evans

28 December 2024 10	Sydney FC	3–0	Melbourne Victory	Sydney
19:35 AEST	Lolley 2', 26'; Kucharski 86'	Report		Stadium: Allianz Stadium; Attendance: 20,015; Referee: Adam Kersey

1 January 2025 11	Auckland FC	0–0	Melbourne Victory	Auckland
15:00 AEST		Report		Stadium: Go Media Stadium; Attendance: 14,997; Referee: Alireza Faghani

4 January 2025 12	Melbourne Victory	2–2	Western Sydney Wanderers	Melbourne
19:35 AEST	Miranda 29'; Teague 87' (pen.)	Report	Hammond 45'; Milanovic 76'	Stadium: AAMI Park; Attendance: 10,025; Referee: Lachlan Keevers

10 January 2025 13	Melbourne Victory	3–4	Western United	Melbourne
19:35 AEST	Hamill 9'; Fornaroli 39'; Santos 79'	Report	Ibusuki 17', 90+4'; Walatee 69'; Botic 90+1'	Stadium: AAMI Park; Attendance: 11,657; Referee: Adam Kersey

18 January 2025 15	Adelaide United	3–2	Melbourne Victory	Adelaide
19:35 AEST	Mauk 31'; Miranda 45+1' (o.g.); Alagich 71'	Report	Teague 18'; Santos 66'	Stadium: Coopers Stadium; Attendance: 14,131; Referee: Alireza Faghani

24 January 2025 16	Melbourne Victory	2–0	Sydney FC	Melbourne
19:35 AEST	Vergos 24'; Fornaroli 90'	Report		Stadium: AAMI Park; Attendance: 14,038; Referee: Lachlan Keevers

1 February 2025 17	Perth Glory	0–2	Melbourne Victory	Perth
21:45 AEST		Report	Velupillay 61'; Santos 66'	Stadium: HBF Park; Attendance: 11,053; Referee: Daniel Cook

8 February 2025 18	Newcastle Jets	3–0	Melbourne Victory	Newcastle
17:00 AEST	Grozos 90+9' (pen.); Taylor 90+14'; Rose 90+20'	Report		Stadium: McDonald Jones Stadium; Attendance: 7,285; Referee: Daniel Elder

14 February 2025 19	Melbourne Victory	1–0	Wellington Phoenix	Melbourne
19:35 AEST	Vergos 57'	Report		Stadium: AAMI Park; Attendance: 9,374; Referee: Adam Bavcar

22 February 2025 20	Melbourne Victory	2–2	Melbourne City	Melbourne
19:35 AEST	Machach 45+7' (pen.); Santos 48'	Report	Tilio 5'; Trewin 70' (pen.)	Stadium: AAMI Park; Attendance: 22,806; Referee: Jonathan Barreiro

1 March 2025 21	Brisbane Roar	1–1	Melbourne Victory	Brisbane
17:00 AEST	Hore 20'	Report	Bos 90+7'	Stadium: Suncorp Stadium; Attendance: 6,544; Referee: Nathan Shakespear

8 March 2025 22	Melbourne Victory	3–0	Central Coast Mariners	Melbourne
19:35 AEST	Velupillay 9'; Fornaroli 41'; Machach 90+2'	Report		Stadium: AAMI Park; Attendance: 8,206; Referee: Shaun Evans

15 March 2025 23	Western Sydney Wanderers	4–2	Melbourne Victory	Sydney
19:35 AEST	Kraev 44'; Borrello 76'; Milanovic 87'; Antonsson 90+4'	Report	Velupillay 34'; Piscopo 41'	Stadium: CommBank Stadium; Attendance: 10,387; Referee: Alex King

29 March 2025 24	Melbourne Victory	5–3	Adelaide United	Melbourne
19:35 AEST	Arzani 29', 71' (pen.); Velupillay 39'; Vergos 88', 90'	Report	Yull 12'; Goodwin 47'; Clough 56'	Stadium: AAMI Park; Attendance: 10,273; Referee: Shaun Evans

12 April 2025 26	Wellington Phoenix	2–3	Melbourne Victory	Wellington
15:00 AEST	Piper 10'; Retre 75'	Report	Velupillay 4'; Machach 46+2'; Vergos 50'	Stadium: Sky Stadium; Attendance: 5,035; Referee: Alireza Faghani

19 April 2025 27	Melbourne Victory	0–2	Auckland FC	Melbourne
17:00 AEST		Report	Verstraete 53'; May 89'	Stadium: AAMI Park; Attendance: 13,564; Referee: Ben Abraham

25 April 2025 28	Macarthur FC	1–2	Melbourne Victory	Macarthur
19:35 AEST	Ikonomidis 68'	Report	Teague 4'; Bos 36'	Stadium: Campbelltown Stadium; Attendance: 3,763; Referee: Daniel Elder

4 May 2025 29	Melbourne Victory	1–1	Newcastle Jets	Melbourne
17:00 AEST	Bos 47'	Report	Taylor 83'	Stadium: AAMI Park; Attendance: 10,033; Referee: Shaun Evans

=== Finals series ===
10 May 2025 Elimination-final	Western Sydney Wanderers	1–2	Melbourne Victory	Sydney
19:35 AEST	Sapsford 23'	Report	Bos 7'; Machach 42'	Stadium: CommBank Stadium; Attendance: 16,399; Referee: Adam Kersey

17 May 2025 Semi-final 1st leg	Melbourne Victory	0–1	Auckland FC	Melbourne
19:35 AEST		Report	Rogerson 64'	Stadium: AAMI Park; Attendance: 14,121; Referee: Ben Abraham

17 May 2025 Semi-final 2nd leg	Auckland FC	0–2 (1–2 agg.)	Melbourne Victory	Auckland
16:00 AEST		Report	Machach 55'; Fornaroli 60'	Stadium: Go Media Stadium; Attendance: 29,148; Referee: Alex King

31 May 2025 Grand Final	Melbourne City	1–0	Melbourne Victory	Melbourne
19:35 AEST	Cohen 10'	Report		Stadium: AAMI Park; Attendance: 29,902; Referee: Adam Kersey

=== Australia Cup ===
6 August 2024 Round of 32	Lambton Jaffas	1–4	Melbourne Victory	Newcastle
19:30 AEST	Bond 36'	Report	Fornaroli 9'; Lee 27'; Velupillay 45+2', 51'	Stadium: Jack McLaughlin Oval

28 August 2024 Round of 16	NWS Spirit	0–4	Melbourne Victory	Sydney
19:30 AEST		Report	Teague 29'; Velupillay 45', 67'; Vergos 57'	Stadium: Christie Park; Attendance: 1,854; Referee: Daniel Cook

14 September 2024 Quarter-finals	Moreton City Excelsior	0–4	Melbourne Victory	Brisbane
18:00 AEST		Report	Vergos 10', 20'; Bos 31'; Velupillay 66'	Stadium: Perry Park; Attendance: 1,850; Referee: Jonathon Barreiro

21 September 2024 Semi-finals	Melbourne Victory	1–0	Adelaide United	Melbourne
19:30 AEST	Valadon 88'	Report		Stadium: AAMI Park; Attendance: 5,131; Referee: Alex King

29 September 2024 Final	Melbourne Victory	0–1	Macarthur FC	Melbourne
19:10 AEST		Report	Jakoliš 58'	Stadium: AAMI Park; Attendance: 13,289; Referee: Jonathan Barreiro

== Statistics ==
=== Appearances and goals ===
Includes all competitions. Players with no appearances not included in the list.

As of 31 May 2025

No.	Pos.	Nat.	Name	A-League Men		A-League Men Finals		Australia Cup		Total	
No.	Pos.	Nat.	Name	Apps	Goals	Apps	Goals	Apps	Goals	Apps	Goals
1	GK	(Australia)	Mitchell Langerak	11	0	0	0	0	0	11	0
3	DF	(Ivory Coast)	Adama Traoré	6+5	1	0	0	1+1	0	13	1
4	DF	(Australia)	Lachlan Jackson	6+2	0	4	0	0	0	12	0
5	DF	(Australia)	Brendan Hamill	20+4	1	1+1	0	5	0	31	1
6	MF	(Australia)	Ryan Teague	24	4	4	0	5	1	33	5
7	FW	(Australia)	Daniel Arzani	16+9	3	4	0	3+1	0	33	3
8	MF	(France)	Zinédine Machach	23+2	5	4	2	5	0	34	7
9	FW	(Greece)	Nikos Vergos	18+8	7	2+2	0	4	3	34	10
10	FW	(Australia)	Bruno Fornaroli	8+15	4	2+2	1	1+2	1	30	6
11	FW	(Brazil)	Santos	9+13	4	2+2	0	0	0	26	4
14	MF	(Australia)	Jordi Valadon	25+1	0	4	0	5	1	35	1
16	DF	(Australia)	Joshua Inserra	3+2	0	2+2	0	0	0	9	0
17	FW	(Australia)	Nishan Velupillay	15+7	7	3	0	5	5	30	12
18	MF	(Australia)	Fabian Monge	1+16	0	0	0	0+3	0	20	0
19	FW	(Australia)	Jing Reec	1+12	0	0+3	0	0+4	0	19	0
21	DF	(Portugal)	Roderick Miranda	25	2	3	0	5	0	33	2
22	DF	(Australia)	Joshua Rawlins	12+7	0	2+2	0	0+3	0	26	0
23	MF	(Australia)	Alexander Badolato	1+5	0	0+3	0	0	0	9	0
25	GK	(Australia)	Jack Duncan	15	0	4	0	5	0	24	0
27	MF	(Australia)	Reno Piscopo	14+8	2	0+3	0	1+4	0	30	2
28	DF	(Australia)	Kasey Bos	21+2	3	3	1	4	1	30	5
35	FW	(Australia)	Jordan Hoey	0	0	0	0	0+2	0	2	0
Player(s) transferred out but featured this season
2	DF	(Australia)	Jason Geria	12	1	0	0	5	0	17	1
31	FW	(Australia)	Alex Lee	0	0	0	0	1	1	1	1

=== Disciplinary record ===
Includes all competitions. The list is sorted by squad number when total cards are equal. Players with no cards not included in the list.

As of 31 May 2025

Rank	No.	Pos.	Nat.	Name	A-League Men			A-League Men Finals			Australia Cup			Total		
Rank	No.	Pos.	Nat.	Name	Booked	(yellow card) (yellow-red card)	Sent off (straight red)	Booked	(yellow card) (yellow-red card)	Sent off (straight red)	Booked	(yellow card) (yellow-red card)	Sent off (straight red)	Booked	(yellow card) (yellow-red card)	Sent off (straight red)
1	21	DF	(Portugal)	Roderick Miranda	2	0	1	0	0	0	0	0	0	2	0	1
2	8	MF	(France)	Zinédine Machach	1	0	1	0	0	0	0	0	0	1	0	1
3	7	FW	(Australia)	Daniel Arzani	2	0	0	2	0	0	1	0	0	5	0	0
4	6	MF	(Australia)	Ryan Teague	3	0	0	1	0	0	0	0	0	4	0	0
4	10	FW	(Australia)	Bruno Fornaroli	3	0	0	1	0	0	0	0	0	4	0	0
4	14	MF	(Australia)	Jordi Valadon	3	0	0	1	0	0	0	0	0	4	0	0
7	4	DF	(Australia)	Lachlan Jackson	2	0	0	1	0	0	0	0	0	3	0	0
7	22	DF	(Australia)	Josh Rawlins	2	0	0	1	0	0	0	0	0	3	0	0
7	28	DF	(Australia)	Kasey Bos	3	0	0	0	0	0	0	0	0	3	0	0
10	1	GK	(Australia)	Mitchell Langerak	2	0	0	0	0	0	0	0	0	2	0	0
10	3	DF	(Ivory Coast)	Adama Traoré	2	0	0	0	0	0	0	0	0	2	0	0
10	5	DF	(Australia)	Brendan Hamill	2	0	0	0	0	0	0	0	0	2	0	0
10	9	FW	(Greece)	Nikos Vergos	1	0	0	0	0	0	1	0	0	2	0	0
10	16	DF	(Australia)	Joshua Inserra	0	0	0	2	0	0	0	0	0	2	0	0
10	25	GK	(Australia)	Jack Duncan	2	0	0	0	0	0	0	0	0	2	0	0
16	17	FW	(Australia)	Nishan Velupillay	1	0	0	0	0	0	0	0	0	1	0	0
16	18	MF	(Australia)	Fabian Monge	1	0	0	0	0	0	0	0	0	1	0	0
16	19	FW	(Australia)	Jing Reec	1	0	0	0	0	0	0	0	0	1	0	0
16	23	MF	(Australia)	Alexander Badolato	1	0	0	0	0	0	0	0	0	1	0	0
Player(s) transferred out but featured this season
1	2	DF	(Australia)	Jason Geria	3	0	0	0	0	0	0	0	0	3	0	0
Total					37	0	2	9	0	0	2	0	0	45	0	2

=== Clean sheets ===
Includes all competitions. The list is sorted by squad number when total clean sheets are equal. Numbers in parentheses represent games where both goalkeepers participated and both kept a clean sheet; the number in parentheses is awarded to the goalkeeper who was substituted on, whilst a full clean sheet is awarded to the goalkeeper who was on the field at the start of play. Goalkeepers with no clean sheets not included in the list.

As of 31 May 2025

Rank	No.	Nat.	Goalkeeper	A-League Men	A-League Men finals series	Australia Cup	Total
1	25	(Australia)	Jack Duncan	4	1	3	8
2	1	(Australia)	Mitchell Langerak	4	0	0	4
Total				8	1	3	12
