= 2024–25 Sydney FC season =

Sydney FC 2024–25 Season

Sydney FC
2024–25 season
- Chairman: Scott Barlow (until 3 June 2025); Jan Voss (from 3 June 2025)
- Head Coach: Ufuk Talay
- Stadium: Allianz Stadium; Jubilee Oval (AFC Champions League Two Group Stage)
- A-League Men: 7th
- A-League Men finals series: DNQ
- AFC Champions League Two: Semi-finals
- Australia Cup: Round of 32
- Top goalscorer: League: Adrian Segecic (13); All: Adrian Segecic (18)
- Highest home attendance: 32,741 vs. Western Sydney Wanderers (8 February 2025); A-League Men
- Lowest home attendance: 2,188 vs. Kaya–Iloilo (5 December 2024); AFC Champions League Two
- Average home league attendance: 13,991
- Biggest win: 5–0 vs. Eastern (H) (19 September 2024); AFC Champions League Two
- Biggest defeat: 1–5 vs. Melbourne City (A) (3 May 2025); A-League Men
Home colours	Away colours

The 2024–25 season was Sydney Football Club's 20th season in the A-League Men. In addition to the domestic league, Sydney FC participated in the Australia Cup as defending champions, and the AFC Champions League Two for the first time.

This was the first season since 2018–19 without former captain Luke Brattan, who departed the club at the end of his contract. Rhyan Grant replaced him as captain in the off-season. This was also the first full season in Sydney's history to not feature Steve Corica in any capacity, following his exit as manager in the previous season.

== Players ==
=== First-team squad ===
Note: Flags indicate national team as defined under FIFA eligibility rules; some limited exceptions apply. Players may hold more than one non-FIFA nationality.

No.	Pos.	Nation	Player
1	GK	AUS	Andrew Redmayne
3	DF	AUS	Aaron Gurd
4	DF	AUS	Jordan Courtney-Perkins
5	DF	AUS	Alex Grant
6	MF	AUS	Corey Hollman (scholarship)
7	FW	AUS	Adrian Segecic
8	MF	MAR	Anas Ouahim
9	FW	POL	Patryk Klimala (on loan from Śląsk Wrocław)
10	FW	ENG	Joe Lolley
11	FW	BRA	Douglas Costa
12	GK	AUS	Harrison Devenish-Meares
15	MF	BRA	Léo Sena
16	DF	AUS	Joel King
17	MF	AUS	Anthony Caceres (vice-captain)

No.	Pos.	Nation	Player
20	FW	AUS	Tiago Quintal
21	DF	AUS	Zac De Jesus
22	MF	AUS	Max Burgess
23	DF	AUS	Rhyan Grant (captain)
24	MF	AUS	Wataru Kamijo
25	FW	AUS	Jaiden Kucharski
27	MF	AUS	Lachie Middleton
29	MF	AUS	Joe Lacey
30	GK	AUS	Gus Hoefsloot (scholarship)
31	FW	AUS	Jaushua Sotirio
33	MF	AUS	Marin France
34	DF	AUS	Will Kennedy (scholarship)
41	DF	AUS	Alexandar Popovic

== Transfers ==
=== Transfers in ===
No.	Position	Player	Transferred from	Type/fee	Contract length	Date	Ref.
12	GK	Harrison Devenish-Meares	(Australia) Rockdale Ilinden	Free transfer	2 years	27 June 2024	
7	FW	Adrian Segecic	(Netherlands) Dordrecht	End of loan	(1 year)	2 July 2024	
8	MF	(Morocco) Anas Ouahim	Unattached	Free transfer	2 years	9 July 2024	
15	MF	(Brazil) Léo Sena	(Brazil) Água Santa	Free transfer	2 years	16 August 2024	
11	FW	(Brazil) Douglas Costa	Unattached	Free transfer	2 years	26 August 2024	
9	FW	(Poland) Patryk Klimala	(Poland) Śląsk Wrocław	Loan	1 year	9 September 2024	
41	DF	Alexandar Popovic	(South Korea) Gwangju	Loan	3 months	18 September 2024	
31	FW	Jaushua Sotirio	Unattached	Free transfer	6 months	17 January 2025	
5	DF	Alex Grant	Unattached	Free transfer	6 months	1 February 2025	
41	DF	Alexandar Popovic	(South Korea) Gwangju	Undisclosed fee	3.5 years	4 February 2025	

==== From youth squad ====
N	Pos.	Nat.	Name	Age	Notes
29	MF	(Australia)	Joe Lacey	16	3-year contract
27	MF	(Australia)	Lachie Middleton	18	3-year contract
20	FW	(Australia)	Tiago Quintal	17	3-year contract
33	MF	(Australia)	Marin France	17	3-year contract
37	DF	(Australia)	Will Kennedy	19	1.5-year scholarship

=== Transfers out ===
No.	Position	Player	Transferred to	Type/fee	Date	Ref.
8	MF	Jake Girdwood-Reich	(United States) St. Louis City	Undisclosed	4 June 2024	
9	FW	(Brazil) Fábio Gomes	(Brazil) Atlético Mineiro	End of loan	30 June 2024	
15	DF	(Brazil) Gabriel Lacerda	(Brazil) Ceará	End of loan	30 June 2024	
6	DF	(England) Jack Rodwell	Unattached	End of contract	30 June 2024	
11	FW	(Slovakia) Róbert Mak	Unattached	End of contract	30 June 2024	
20	GK	Adam Pavlesic	Unattached	End of contract	30 June 2024	
26	MF	Luke Brattan	Unattached	End of contract	30 June 2024	
18	MF	Matthew Scarcella	Newcastle Jets	Loan	2 July 2024	
19	FW	Mitchell Glasson	(Finland) KTP	Loan	5 January 2025	
13	FW	Patrick Wood	Perth Glory	Loan	17 January 2025	
28	FW	Nathan Amanatidis	Brisbane Roar	Free transfer	23 January 2025	
5	DF	Hayden Matthews	(England) Portsmouth	$2,500,000	27 January 2025	
41	DF	Alexandar Popovic	(South Korea) Gwangju	End of loan	4 February 2025	

=== Contract extensions ===
No.	Position	Name	Duration	Date	Note
17	MF	Anthony Caceres	1 year	22 May 2024	(Note: Caceres was contracted until the end of the 2023–24 season, however no announcement was made by Sydney FC in relation to a contract extension.)
13	FW	Patrick Wood	1 year	17 October 2024	Contract extended from end of 2024–25 to end of 2025–26 (Note: There is an option for an additional season.)
3	DF	Aaron Gurd	1 year	19 December 2024	Contract extended from end of 2024–25 to end of 2025–26
12	GK	Harrison Devenish-Meares	1 year	2 January 2025	Contract extended from end of 2025–26 to end of 2026–27

== Kits ==
Home	Home Alt	Away	Australia Cup	Goalkeeper 1	Goalkeeper 2	Goalkeeper 3

== Pre-season and friendlies ==
18 July 2024	Newcastle Jets (Australia)	0–4	(Australia) Sydney FC	Maitland
		Report	Kucharski 13'; Courtney-Perkins 48'; Ouahim 53' (pen.); Amanatidis 75' (pen.)	Stadium: Maitland Sports Ground; Attendance: 0 (behind closed doors)

24 July 2024	Sydney FC (Australia)	6–0	(Australia) NWS Spirit	Sydney
	Kucharski 8', 27'; Segecic 13'; Courtney-Perkins 57', 62'; Gurd 90'	Report		Stadium: Leichhardt Oval; Attendance: 0 (behind closed doors)

22 August 2024	Sydney FC (Australia)	8–0	(Australia) Manly United	Sydney
	Hollman 6', 50'; Segecic 13'; Ouahim 19', 22' (pen.); Kucharski 8', 27'; ? 83' (o.g.)	Report		Stadium: Valentine Sports Park; Attendance: 0 (behind closed doors)

6 September 2024	Central Coast Mariners (Australia)	2–0	(Australia) Sydney FC	Tuggerah
	Doka 24' (pen.); Edmondson 34'	Report		Stadium: Central Coast Regional Sports Complex; Attendance: 0 (behind closed doors)

11 September 2024	Sydney FC (Australia)	3–2	(Australia) Newcastle Jets	Sydney
	Lolley 13'; Grant 48'; Courtney-Perkins 59'	Report	Rose 30'; Gibson 87'	Stadium: Jubilee Oval; Attendance: 0 (behind closed doors)

25 September 2024	Sydney FC (Australia)	6–3	(Australia) Central Coast Mariners	Sydney, Australia
	Klimala 23', 40', 65'; Hollman 48'; Costa 59'; Segecic 69'	Report	Kuol 43'; De Lima 49'; Wilson 78'	Stadium: Sky Park

12 October 2024	Sydney FC (Australia)	3–2	(Australia) Newcastle Jets	Sydney
	Lolley 10'; Klimana 20'; Costa 48'	Report	Rose 5'; Adams 75'	Stadium: Sky Park; Attendance: 0 (behind closed doors)

== Competitions ==
=== Overall record ===
Competition	First match	Last match	Starting round	Final position	Record							
Competition	First match	Last match	Starting round	Final position	Pld	W	D	L	GF	GA	GD	Win %
A-League Men	19 October 2024	3 May 2025	Matchday 1	7th	26	10	7	9	53	46	+7	38.46
Australia Cup	30 July 2024		Round of 32	Round of 32	1	0	0	1	1	3	−2	0.00
AFC Champions League Two	19 September 2024	16 April 2024	Group stage	Semi-finals	12	8	1	3	28	14	+14	66.67
Total					39	18	8	13	82	63	+19	46.15

Source: Competitions

=== A-League Men ===
==== League table ====
Pos	Team	Pld	W	D	L	GF	GA	GD	Pts	Qualification
5	Melbourne Victory	26	12	7	7	44	36	+8	43	Qualification for Finals series (Note: The top two teams enter the finals series at the semi-finals, while the teams ranked third to sixth enter the finals series at the elimination-finals.)
6	Adelaide United	26	10	8	8	53	55	−2	38	Qualification for Finals series
7	Sydney FC	26	10	7	9	53	46	+7	37	
8	Macarthur FC	26	9	6	11	50	45	+5	33	Qualification for AFC Champions League Two (Note: Qualified for AFC Champions League Two as the 2024 Australia Cup winners.)
9	Newcastle Jets	26	8	6	12	43	44	−1	30	

Source: A-Leagues
Rules for classification: 1) points; 2) goal difference; 3) goals scored; 4) wins; 5) head-to-head results; 5a) head-to-head points; 5b) head-to-head goal difference; 6) Fair Play points; 7) away goal difference; 8) away goals per match; 9) home goal difference; 10) home goals per match; 11) toss of a coin in an event of a tie of two clubs.

==== Results summary ====
Overall								Home						Away					
Pld	W	D	L	GF	GA	GD	Pts	W	D	L	GF	GA	GD	W	D	L	GF	GA	GD
26	10	7	9	51	44	+7	37	6	3	4	34	23	+11	4	4	5	17	21	−4

Source: Ultimate A-League
Home figures include Sydney FC's 4–2 win on neutral ground against Western Sydney Wanderers on 23 November 2024.

==== Results by round ====
Round	1	2	3	4	5	6	7	8	9	10	12	11	13	14	15	16	17	18	19	20	21	22	23	24	25	26	27	28	29
Ground	A	A	A	H	N	B	A	H	A	H	A	H	H	A	H	A	H	H	B	A	A	B	H	H	A	H	H	A	A
Result	W	L	W	L	W	X	L	L	D	W	D	W	W	D	L	L	W	D	X	D	W	X	D	L	W	D	W	L	L
Position	3	6	3	7	6	6	6	7	8	8	8	7	6	4	5	7	5	4	6	7	7	7	7	7	6	6	6	7	7
Points	3	3	6	6	9	9	9	9	10	13	14	17	20	21	21	21	24	25	25	26	29	29	30	30	33	34	37	37	37

Source: Ultimate A-League
A = Away; H = Home; N = Neutral; B = Bye; W = Win; D = Draw; L = Loss; X = Bye

==== Matches ====
19 October 2024 1	Western Sydney Wanderers	1–2	Sydney FC	Sydney
19:35 AEDT	Hammond 56'	Report	Lolley 17'; Klimala 63'	Stadium: CommBank Stadium; Attendance: 27,496; Referee: Alex King

27 October 2024 2	Auckland FC	1–0	Sydney FC	Auckland
16:00 NZDT	Pijnaker 90+7'	Report		Stadium: Go Media Stadium; Attendance: 14,253; Referee: Shaun Evans

1 November 2024 3	Brisbane Roar	2–3	Sydney FC	Brisbane
18:35 AEST	Waddingham 67'; Struick 78'	Report	Klimala 51'; Sena 71'; Kucharski 90'	Stadium: Suncorp Stadium; Attendance: 8,276; Referee: Shane Skinner

10 November 2024 4	Sydney FC	1–2	Macarthur FC	Sydney
18:00 AEDT	Wood 88'	Report	Piol 73'; Jakoliš 90+6'	Stadium: Allianz Stadium; Attendance: 12,194; Referee: Casey Reibelt

23 November 2024 5	Sydney FC	4–2	Western Sydney Wanderers	Sydney
19:35 AEDT	Lolley 33'; Courtney-Perkins 48'; Ouhaim 54' (pen.); Klimala 82'	Report	Sapsford 45+4'; Antonsson 78'	Stadium: Allianz Stadium; Attendance: 30,777; Referee: Daniel Elder

8 December 2024 7	Central Coast Mariners	2–1	Sydney FC	Gosford
18:00 AEDT	Kuol 58', 70'	Report	Klimala 65'	Stadium: Industree Group Stadium; Attendance: 6,191; Referee: Adam Kersey

14 December 2024 8	Sydney FC	3–4	Western United	Sydney
17:00 AEDT	Segecic 37', 45+2'; R. Grant 68'	Report	Botic 3'; Walatee 46'; Bozinovski 62'; Ruhs 87'	Stadium: Allianz Stadium; Attendance: 11,757; Referee: Jack Morgan

20 December 2024 9	Adelaide United	3–3	Sydney FC	Adelaide
19:05 ACDT	Goodwin 5', 54'; Mauk 25'	Report	Costa 16', 89'; Courtney-Perkins 90+5'	Stadium: Coopers Stadium; Attendance: 11,907; Referee: Daniel Elder

28 December 2024 10	Sydney FC	3–0	Melbourne Victory	Sydney
19:35 AEDT	Lolley 2', 26'; Kucharski 86'	Report		Stadium: Allianz Stadium; Attendance: 20,015; Referee: Adam Kersey

4 January 2025 12	Newcastle Jets	2–2	Sydney FC	Newcastle
17:00 AEDT	Gurd 45' (o.g.); Taylor 72'	Report	Lolley 78'; Caceres 89'	Stadium: McDonald Jones Stadium; Attendance: 8,548; Referee: Alex King

8 January 2025 11	Sydney FC	3–0	Perth Glory	Sydney
19:00 AEDT	Lolley 52', 70' (pen.), 88'	Report		Stadium: Allianz Stadium; Attendance: 7,634; Referee: Sam Kelly

11 January 2025 13	Sydney FCapp	4–1	Central Coast Mariners	Sydney
19:35 AEDT	Klimala 11'; Segecic 72', 83', 90+5'	Report	Steele 40'	Stadium: Allianz Stadium; Attendance: 11,111; Referee: Daniel Elder

15 January 2025 14	Wellington Phoenix	0–0	Sydney FC	Wellington
19:00 NZDT		Report		Stadium: Sky Stadium; Attendance: 4,858; Referee: Shaun Evans

18 January 2025 15	Sydney FC	3–4	Brisbane Roar	Sydney
17:00 AEDT	King 32'; Quintal 84'; Courtney-Perkins 88'	Report	Halloran 16'; Hore 21'; Zimarino 41'; Herrington 72'	Stadium: Allianz Stadium; Attendance: 10,506; Referee: Tim Danaskos

24 January 2025 16	Melbourne Victory	2–0	Sydney FC	Melbourne
19:35 AEDT	Vergos 24'; Fornaroli 90'	Report		Stadium: AAMI Park; Attendance: 14,038; Referee: Lachlan Keevers

1 February 2025 17	Sydney FC	4–1	Adelaide United	Sydney
17:00 AEDT	Lolley 36'; Klimala 46'; Segecic 75'; Caceres 83'	Report	Pierias 49'	Stadium: Allianz Stadium; Attendance: 13,096; Referee: Shaun Evans

8 February 2025 18	Sydney FC	3–3	Western Sydney Wanderers	Sydney
19:35 AEDT	Klimala 7'; Segecic 88'; Caceres 90+7'	Report	Sapsford 9', 49'; R. Grant 39' (o.g.)	Stadium: Allianz Stadium; Attendance: 32,741; Referee: Shaun Evans

22 February 2025 20	Perth Glory	0–0	Sydney FC	Perth
18:45 AWST		Report		Stadium: HBF Park; Attendance: 6,889; Referee: Daniel Elder

1 March 2025 21	Macarthur FC	0–2	Sydney FC	Sydney
19:35 AEDT		Report	Klimala 68'; Segecic 73'	Stadium: Campbelltown Sports Stadium; Attendance: 8,002; Referee: Adam Kersey

16 March 2025 23	Sydney FC	1–1	Wellington Phoenix	Sydney
17:00 AEDT	Segecic 7'	Report	Barbarouses 38'	Stadium: Allianz Stadium; Attendance: 7,014; Referee: Shaun Evans

29 March 2025 24	Sydney FC	2–3	Melbourne City	Sydney
17:00 AEDT	Courtney-Perkins 28'; Costa 39'	Report	Memeti 5'; Caputo 35'; Lopane 61'	Stadium: Allianz Stadium; Attendance: 13,268; Referee: Adam Kersey

5 April 2025 25	Adelaide United	2–3	Sydney FC	Adelaide
19:05 ACDT	Goodwin 46', 73'	Report	Klimala 18', 52'; Segecic 90+4'	Stadium: Coopers Stadium; Attendance: 10,239; Referee: Ben Abraham

12 April 2025 26	Sydney FC	2–2	Auckland FC	Sydney
17:00 AEST	Segecic 12', 32'	Report	Rogerson 35'; de Vries 68'	Stadium: Allianz Stadium; Attendance: 18,437; Referee: Alex King

20 April 2025 27	Sydney FC	3–2	Newcastle Jets	Sydney
15:00 AEST	Costa 36'; Segecic 55'; Kucharski 83'	Report	Rose 18'; Mizunuma 22'	Stadium: Allianz Stadium; Attendance: 10,114; Referee: Shaun Evans

27 April 2025 28	Western United	1–0	Sydney FC	Melbourne
17:00 AEST	Grimaldi 4'	Report		Stadium: Ironbark Fields; Attendance: 2,886; Referee: Alex King

3 May 2025 29	Melbourne City	5–1	Sydney FC	Melbourne
17:00 AEST	Behich 5'; Caputo 26'; Tilio 34'; Kuen 57'; Memeti 90+5'	Report	Klimala 66'	Stadium: AAMI Park; Attendance: 6,098; Referee: Adam Kersey

=== Australia Cup ===
30 July 2024 Round of 32	Oakleigh Cannons	3–1	Sydney FC	Melbourne
19:30 AEST	Sinclair 14'; Kasumovic 38'; Wellsmore 74'	Report	Ouahim 25' (pen.)	Stadium: The Home of the Matildas; Attendance: 1,200; Referee: Shaun Evans

=== AFC Champions League Two ===
==== Group stage ====
Pos	Team	Pld	W	D	L	GF	GA	GD	Pts	Qualification	SFR	SYD	KAY	EAS
1	(Japan) Sanfrecce Hiroshima	6	5	1	0	14	5	+9	16	Advance to round of 16	—	2–1	3–0	4–1
2	(Australia) Sydney FC	6	4	0	2	17	6	+11	12	Advance to round of 16	0–1	—	3–1	5–0
3	(Philippines) Kaya–Iloilo	6	1	1	4	6	14	−8	4		1–1	1–4	—	1–2
4	(Hong Kong) Eastern	6	1	0	5	7	19	−12	3		2–3	1–4	1–2	—

Source: AFC
Rules for classification: Tiebreakers

19 September 2024 1	Sydney FC (Australia)	5–0	(Hong Kong) Eastern	Sydney
19:00 UTC+10	Ouahim 32', 55'; R. Grant 44'; Almazan 64' (o.g.); Chun Pong 71' (o.g.)	Report		Stadium: Jubilee Stadium; Attendance: 4,021; Referee: Thoriq Alkatiri (Indonesia)

3 October 2024 2	Kaya–Iloilo (Philippines)	1–4	(Australia) Sydney FC	Manila, Philippines
18:00 UTC+8	Horikoshi 3'	Report	Lolley 26'; Klimala 59', 63'; Amanatidis 90+5'	Stadium: Rizal Memorial Sports Complex; Attendance: 372; Referee: Hassan Akrami (Iran)

24 October 2024 3	Sanfrecce Hiroshima (Japan)	2–1	(Australia) Sydney FC	Hiroshima, Japan
19:00 UTC+9	Higashi 20'; Sotiriou 55'	Report	Segecic 90'	Stadium: Hiroshima Soccer Stadium; Attendance: 12,209; Referee: Yahya Al-Mulla (United Arab Emirates)

7 November 2024 4	Sydney FC (Australia)	0–1	(Japan) Sanfrecce Hiroshima	Sydney
19:00 UTC+11		Report	Kato 60'	Stadium: Jubilee Stadium; Attendance: 3,512; Referee: Ammar Ebrahim Mahfoodh (Bahrain)

28 November 2024 5	Eastern (Hong Kong)	1–4	(Australia) Sydney FC	Kowloon, Hong Kong
18:00 UTC+8	Baffoe 49'	Report	Ouahim 5', 45+1', 62' (pen.); Klimala 17'	Stadium: Mong Kok Stadium; Attendance: 1,712; Referee: Abdulla Ali Al Athba Al Marri (Bahrain)

5 December 2024 6	Sydney FC (Australia)	3–1	(Philippines) Kaya–Iloilo	Sydney
19:00 UTC+11	Segecic 38'; Wood 45+2'; Kucharski 75'	Report	Lopez Mendy 85'	Stadium: Jubilee Stadium; Attendance: 2,188; Referee: Tejas Nagvenkar (India)

==== Knockout stage ====
12 February 2025 Round of 16	Sydney FC (Australia)	2–2	(Thailand) Bangkok United	Sydney
19:00 UTC+11	Segecic 60', 79'	Report	Živković 50' (pen.); Puangchan 90+6'	Stadium: Sydney Football Stadium; Attendance: 5,131; Referee: Yoshimi Yamashita (Japan)

19 February 2025 Round of 16	Bangkok United (Thailand)	2–3 (a.e.t.) (4–5 agg.)	(Australia) Sydney FC	Rangsit, Thailand
19:00 UTC+7	Al-Ghassani 18'; Eid 54'	Report	Lolley 2'; Segecic 88'; Costa 100'	Stadium: Thammasat Stadium; Attendance: 1,819; Referee: Ilgiz Tantashev (Uzbekistan)

6 March 2025 Quarter-final	Jeonbuk Hyundai Motors (South Korea)	0–2	(Australia) Sydney FC	Yongin, South Korea
19:00 UTC+9		Report	Klimala 36', 66'	Stadium: Yongin Mireu Stadium; Attendance: 2,561; Referee: Asker Nadjafaliev (Uzbekistan)

13 March 2025 Quarter-final	Sydney FC (Australia)	3–2 (5–2 agg.)	(South Korea) Jeonbuk Hyundai Motors	Sydney
19:00 UTC+11	A. Grant 59'; Klimala 71'; Costa 82' (pen.)		Jeon Jin-woo 35', 45+4'	Stadium: Sydney Football Stadium; Attendance: 7,039; Referee: Abdulla Al Marri (Qatar)

9 April 2025 Semi-final	Lion City Sailors (Singapore)	2–0	(Australia) Sydney FC	Singapore
20:00 UTC+8	Ramselaar 18'; Thy 53'	Report		Stadium: Jalan Besar Stadium; Attendance: 4,213; Referee: Zaid Thamer Mohammed (Iraq)

16 April 2025 Semi-final	Sydney FC (Australia)	1–0 (1–2 agg.)	(Singapore) Lion City Sailors	Sydney
20:00 UTC+10	Lolley 85'	Report		Stadium: Sydney Football Stadium; Attendance: 10,588; Referee: Abdullah Jamali (Kuwait)

== Statistics ==
=== Appearances and goals ===
Includes all competitions. Players with no appearances not included in the list.

No.	Pos	Nat	Player	Total		A-League Men		Australia Cup		AFC Champions League Two	
No.	Pos	Nat	Player	Apps	Goals	Apps	Goals	Apps	Goals	Apps	Goals
Goalkeepers
1	GK	(Australia) AUS	Andrew Redmayne	12	0	6+2	0	1	0	3	0
12	GK	(Australia) AUS	Harrison Devenish-Meares	29	0	20	0	0	0	9	0
Defenders
3	DF	(Australia) AUS	Aaron Gurd	8	0	3+3	0	0	0	1+1	0
4	DF	(Australia) AUS	Jordan Courtney-Perkins	37	4	21+4	4	1	0	11	0
5	DF	(Australia) AUS	Alex Grant	7	1	4	0	0	0	3	1
16	DF	(Australia) AUS	Joel King	35	1	15+8	1	1	0	7+4	0
21	DF	(Australia) AUS	Zac De Jesus	15	0	9+3	0	0	0	2+1	0
23	DF	(Australia) AUS	Rhyan Grant	36	2	24	1	1	0	11	1
34	DF	(Australia) AUS	Tyler Williams	1	0	0	0	0	0	0+1	0
37	DF	(Australia) AUS	Will Kennedy	6	0	0+2	0	0	0	0+4	0
41	DF	(Australia) AUS	Alexandar Popovic	23	0	15+1	0	0	0	6+1	0
42	DF	(Australia) AUS	Kyle Shaw	4	0	2+1	0	0	0	1	0
Midfielders
6	MF	(Australia) AUS	Corey Hollman	29	0	11+7	0	0+1	0	4+6	0
8	MF	(Morocco) MAR	Anas Ouahim	32	7	17+5	1	1	1	5+4	5
15	MF	(Brazil) BRA	Léo Sena	31	1	20	1	0	0	11	0
17	MF	(Australia) AUS	Anthony Caceres	35	3	24	3	0	0	11	0
22	MF	(Australia) AUS	Max Burgess	7	0	2+1	0	0	0	1+3	0
24	MF	(Australia) AUS	Wataru Kamijo	13	0	6+2	0	0	0	3+2	0
27	MF	(Australia) AUS	Lachie Middleton	1	0	0	0	1	0	0	0
32	MF	(Australia) AUS	Nick Alfaro	2	0	0	0	0+1	0	0+1	0
33	MF	(Australia) AUS	Marin France	3	0	0	0	1	0	0+2	0
Forwards
7	FW	(Australia) AUS	Adrian Segecic	36	18	14+10	13	1	0	6+5	5
9	FW	(Poland) POL	Patryk Klimala	30	17	18+2	11	0	0	10	6
10	FW	(England) ENG	Joe Lolley	34	12	24	9	0	0	10	3
11	FW	(Brazil) BRA	Douglas Costa	25	6	12+4	4	0	0	8+1	2
20	FW	(Australia) AUS	Tiago Quintal	22	1	0+17	1	0	0	1+4	0
25	FW	(Australia) AUS	Jaiden Kucharski	31	4	3+21	3	1	0	1+5	1
31	FW	(Australia) AUS	Jaushua Sotirio	2	0	0+2	0	0	0	0	0
36	FW	(Australia) AUS	Mathias Macallister	1	0	0	0	0	0	0+1	0
Player(s) transferred out but featured this season
5	DF	(Australia) AUS	Hayden Matthews	19	0	12	0	1	0	6	0
13	FW	(Australia) AUS	Patrick Wood	10	2	1+8	1	0	0	1	1
19	FW	(Australia) AUS	Mitchell Glasson	2	0	0	0	0+1	0	0+1	0
28	FW	(Australia) AUS	Nathan Amanatidis	6	1	0+2	0	1	0	1+2	1

=== Disciplinary record ===
Includes all competitions. The list is sorted by squad number when total cards are equal. Players with no cards not included in the list.

Rank	No.	Pos.	Nat.	Name	A-League Men			Australia Cup			AFC Champions League Two			Total		
Rank	No.	Pos.	Nat.	Name	Booked	(yellow card) (yellow-red card)	Sent off (straight red)	Booked	(yellow card) (yellow-red card)	Sent off (straight red)	Booked	(yellow card) (yellow-red card)	Sent off (straight red)	Booked	(yellow card) (yellow-red card)	Sent off (straight red)
1	12	GK	(Australia)	Harrison Devenish-Meares	0	0	1	0	0	0	1	0	0	1	0	1
2	22	MF	(Australia)	Max Burgess	0	0	1	0	0	0	0	0	0	0	0	1
3	8	MF	(Morocco)	Anas Ouahim	6	0	0	0	0	0	2	0	0	8	0	0
4	9	FW	(Poland)	Patryk Klimala	4	0	0	0	0	0	3	0	0	7	0	0
4	23	DF	(Australia)	Rhyan Grant	6	0	0	0	0	0	1	0	0	7	0	0
6	4	DF	(Australia)	Jordan Courtney-Perkins	6	0	0	0	0	0	0	0	0	6	0	0
6	15	MF	(Brazil)	Léo Sena	4	0	0	0	0	0	2	0	0	6	0	0
8	41	DF	(Australia)	Alexandar Popovic	3	0	0	0	0	0	2	0	0	5	0	0
9	7	FW	(Australia)	Adrian Segecic	4	0	0	0	0	0	0	0	0	4	0	0
9	11	FW	(Brazil)	Douglas Costa	3	0	0	0	0	0	1	0	0	4	0	0
11	16	DF	(Australia)	Joel King	1	0	0	1	0	0	1	0	0	3	0	0
11	17	MF	(Australia)	Anthony Caceres	3	0	0	0	0	0	0	0	0	3	0	0
11	21	DF	(Australia)	Zac De Jesus	3	0	0	0	0	0	0	0	0	3	0	0
14	24	MF	(Australia)	Wataru Kamijo	2	0	0	0	0	0	0	0	0	2	0	0
15	1	GK	(Australia)	Andrew Redmayne	1	0	0	0	0	0	0	0	0	1	0	0
15	6	MF	(Australia)	Corey Hollman	1	0	0	0	0	0	0	0	0	1	0	0
15	5	DF	(Australia)	Alex Grant	0	0	0	0	0	0	1	0	0	1	0	0
15	20	FW	(Australia)	Tiago Quintal	1	0	0	0	0	0	0	0	0	1	0	0
15	33	MF	(Australia)	Marin France	0	0	0	1	0	0	0	0	0	1	0	0
15	42	DF	(Australia)	Kyle Shaw	1	0	0	0	0	0	0	0	0	1	0	0
Player(s) transferred out but featured this season
	5	DF	(Australia)	Hayden Matthews	1	1	0	0	0	0	1	0	0	2	1	0
Total					50	1	2	2	0	0	15	0	0	67	1	2

=== Hat-tricks ===
Player	Against	Result	Date	Competition	Ref.
(Morocco) Anas Ouahim	Eastern (A)	4–1	28 November 2024	AFC Champions League Two	
(England) Joe Lolley	Perth Glory (H)	3–0	8 January 2025	A-League Men	
(Australia) Adrian Segecic	Central Coast Mariners (H)	4–1	11 January 2025	A-League Men	

=== Clean sheets ===
Includes all competitions. The list is sorted by squad number when total clean sheets are equal. Numbers in parentheses represent games where both goalkeepers participated and both kept a clean sheet; the number in parentheses is awarded to the goalkeeper who was substituted on, whilst a full clean sheet is awarded to the goalkeeper who was on the field at the start of play. Goalkeepers with no clean sheets not included in the list.

Rank	No.	Nat.	Goalkeeper	A-League Men	Australia Cup	AFC Champions League Two	Total
1	12	(Australia)	Harrison Devenish-Meares	5	0	3	8
Total				5	0	3	8

== End of Season awards ==
On 4 June 2025, Sydney FC hosted their annual Sky Blue Ball and presented thirteen awards on the night.

Award	Winner
Player of the Year	(Australia) Adrian Segecic
Member's Player of the Year	(Australia) Adrian Segecic
U20 Player of the Year	(Australia) Wataru Kamijo
Golden Boot	(Australia) Adrian Segecic
Rising Star Award	(Australia) Mathias Macallister
Powerchair Players’ Player of the Year	(Australia) Riley Brown
Sydney FC Club Star Award	Joshua Patrocinio (Videographer)
Volunteer Recognition Award	Ross Anderson
Volunteer Recognition Award	Sue McNally

== See also ==
- 2024–25 Sydney FC (A-League Women) season
