= Adrian Segečić =

Australian soccer player (born 2004)

Personal information
- Date of birth: 1 June 2004 (age 22)
- Place of birth: Westmead, New South Wales, Australia
- Height: 1.73 m (5 ft 8 in)
- Position: Attacking midfielder

Team information
- Current team: Portsmouth
- Number: 10

Youth career
- Lidcombe Waratah Junior SC
- 2016: Parramatta FC
- 2017–2023: Sydney FC

Senior career*
Years	Team	Apps	(Gls)
2020–2023	Sydney FC NPL	30	(15)
2021–2025	Sydney FC	44	(14)
2023–2024	→ Dordrecht (loan)	27	(5)
2025–	Portsmouth	47	(13)

International career^{‡}
2019	Australia U17	5	(1)
2022–2023	Australia U20	9	(4)
2023–2025	Australia U23	7	(0)
2026–	Croatia U21	6	(1)
Medal record
Men's football
Representing Australia
WAFF U-23 Championship
Runner-up	2024 Saudi Arabia
- * Club domestic league appearances and goals as of 00:21, 15 October 2026 (UTC) ‡ National team caps and goals as of 17 November 2026

Adrian Segečić (Croatian: [ǎdrian sɛɡětʃitɕ] AH-dree-ahn SEH-geh-chich; born 1 June 2004) is a professional soccer player who plays as an attacking midfielder for EFL Championship club Portsmouth. Born in Australia, he plays for the Croatia under-21 national team.

== Early life ==
Born in Westmead and raised in Lidcombe, Adrian Segečić developed a passion for football from a young age, idolising Argentine footballer Lionel Messi who he bases his playing style from. Segečić received his education at Trinity Catholic College, a prominent educational institution located in New South Wales (NSW). His father played a significant role when Adrian played football, watching every game he played and providing help and feedback after each game to aid his development. Segečić is of Croatian descent, through his grandparents who originated from the country.

He trialed for multiple clubs in Europe with the likes of Liverpool, Manchester City, Leeds United, Chelsea, Wolverhampton Wanderers, Ajax, Dinamo Zagreb and Rangers. During his trial with Rangers, a leaked photo showed him walking onto the pitch at Ibrox Stadium while being announced on the big screen. Many fans speculated that he was a new signing, even though the club did not make an official announcement.

== Club career ==
=== Sydney FC ===
After winning the MVP award at a football camp, Segečić made a strong impression on Sydney FC, who subsequently invited him to join the academy squad. In October 2016, he accepted and was officially announced as part of the squad list on 29 January 2016. In January 2020, He featured briefly for Sydney FC Youth in the final round of the A-League Youth against Canberra United. He was called up again in August after turning 16 a month before, making his NPL NSW debut against North Shore Mariners.

Segečić earned his first call-up to the A-League squad in the Finals series semi final against Adelaide United. He was on the bench in the Grand Final against Melbourne City. By the end of the 2020–21 campaign, Segečić won the club's Rising Star Award. On 26 December 2021, Segečić made his professional league debut against Macarthur FC, coming off the bench in the 76th minute in a 3–0 away win. He made his AFC Champions League debut in a play-off match against Kaya. On 7 April 2022, Sydney FC announced Segečić among the ten youth players registered for the AFC Champions League ahead of the group stage. After featuring in a number of games at the age of 17, on 9 May 2022, he was offered his first professional contract that was set to expire in 2025.

Segečić made his first start for Sydney FC in a match against Central Coast Mariners in the Round of 32 of the Australia Cup. In this match, he contributed an assist to Adam Le Fondre for the team's third goal, helping them secure a 3–3 draw and a win in the penalty shoot-out. His performance from last match earnt him a starting place in the next round against Bentleigh Greens, scoring his first senior goal for the club in a 2–1 win by full time. He would score again against Oakleigh Cannons, but only a consolation goal as his side lost in a 2–1 upset and getting knocked out of the competition. Segečić made his Big Blue debut in the opening round of the 2022–23 A-League season playing in front of 21,840 fans as his side lost 3–2 at home. On 29 October, Segečić scored his first league goal, being on the receiving end of a cross by Jaiden Kucharski to make it 3–1 against Macarthur FC. The final score was 3–2 at Campbeltown. After an impressive display against Newcastle Jets, Segečić assisted a goal to contribute a 2–0 victory and received Player of the match.

==== Loan to Dordrecht ====
On 30 August 2023, Segečić joined Dutch club Dordrecht on loan with an option to buy. He made 30 appearances for the Schapenkoppen, scoring five times as they reached the Eerste Divisie play-offs.

==== Return to Sydney FC ====
Segečić returned to Sydney FC for the 2024–25 season, where he scored thirteen times in 24 A-League appearances, sharing the Golden Boot with Adelaide United's Archie Goodwin. He was also named in the A-League's team of the season and was awarded Sydney's player of the season. On 11 January 2025, he scored his first senior hat-trick after coming on as a 55th-minute substitute in a 4–1 win over Central Coast Mariners. In the AFC Champions League Two, he scored five goals in eleven matches as Sydney reached the semi-finals, where they were defeated by Singaporean club Lion City Sailors.

Segečić's form in 2024–25 saw him named in an ASEAN All-Stars team for an exhibition match against Manchester United in May 2025. He assisted the only goal of the match as the ASEAN All-Stars defeated the Premier League team 1–0 in Kuala Lumpur.

=== Portsmouth ===
On 18 June 2025, Segečić joined EFL Championship club Portsmouth. He made his official debut in the season opener against Oxford United, scoring the only goal of a 1–0 win. Segečić scored Portsmouth's only goal in a 5–1 defeat to Coventry City, though the result confirmed Portsmouth's Championship status following other league results. The following game he first hat-trick for the club on 25 April, scoring all three goals in a 3–1 win over Stoke City at the Bet365 Stadium. Having scored a total of four goals, assisting a further three, he was named EFL Championship Player of the Month for April.

== International career ==
=== Youth ===
In July 2019, Segečić received his first call-up to the Australia U15 for the 2019 AFF U-15 Championship hosted in Thailand. He would feature in all group matches, scoring a goal in a 3–0 win against Laos.

In September 2022, Segečić was called up to the Australia U20 for the U-20 Costa Cálida Supercup in Spain. He would make his debut in a 3–0 loss against England. Segečić would remain with Australia squad, alongside teammate Jake Girdwood-Reich, to play in the 2023 AFC U-20 Asian Cup in hopes of qualifying to the U-20 World Cup. On 4 March 2023, he scored two goals, one being a free-kick, in a 3–2 victory against Iran in their second match of the tournament. Australia progressed to the quarter-finals of the AFC Championship but were knocked out by Uzbekistan in a penalty shoot-out. After the shoot-out led 5–4, Segečić missed the deciding penalty, leading to his team missing out on a place in the U-20 World Cup.

=== Senior ===
On 13 March 2026, Segečić received approval from FIFA to switch his international allegiance to the Croatia national team. His eligibility comes from his Croatian heritage through his grandparents, who immigrated to Australia. The decision, which came as a surprise, was controversial in his home country of Australia, as the Socceroos would lose a player regarded as among their best talents. Many fans blamed his defection on a lack of selection by head coach Tony Popović (who also happens to be of Croatian descent), while others blamed Croatian nationalism due to stating his desire to play for Croatia following the switch.

== Career statistics ==
As of match played 14 October 2026

Appearances and goals by club, season and competition
Club	Season	League			National cup (Note: Includes Australia Cup, KNVB Cup, FA Cup)		League cup (Note: Includes EFL Cup)		Continental		Other		Total	
Club	Season	Division	Apps	Goals	Apps	Goals	Apps	Goals	Apps	Goals	Apps	Goals	Apps	Goals
Sydney FC	2021–22	A-League	4	0	—		—		—		—		4	0
Sydney FC	2022–23	A-League Men	16	1	3	2	—		2 (Note: Appearances in AFC Champions League)	0	2 (Note: One appearance in A-League Men finals, one appearance in Sydney Super Cup)	0	23	3
Sydney FC	2023–24	A-League Men	0	0	1	0	—		—		—		1	0
Sydney FC	2024–25	A-League Men	24	13	1	0	—		11 (Note: Appearances in AFC Champions League Two)	5	—		36	18
Sydney FC	Total		44	14	5	2	—		13	5	2	0	64	21
Dordrecht (loan)	2023–24	Eerste Divisie	27	5	2	0	—		—		1 (Note: Appearance in Eerste Divisie promotion play-offs)	0	30	5
Portsmouth	2025–26	Championship	38	11	1	0	1	0	—		—		40	11
Portsmouth	2026–27	Championship	9	2	0	0	1	1	—		—		10	3
Portsmouth	Total		47	13	1	0	2	1	—		—		50	14
Career total			118	32	8	2	2	1	13	5	3	0	144	40

== Honours ==
Australia U23

- WAFF U-23 Championship runner-up: 2024

Individual

- EFL Championship Player of the Month: April 2026
