= A-League Men Goalkeeper of the Year =

The A-League Men Goalkeeper of the Year is an annual soccer award presented to the best goalkeeper in the A-League Men. The award is determined by a panel of experts.

The A-League was founded in 2005 to replace the semi-professional National Soccer League. The number of teams in the league has ranged from eight to twelve and there are currently twelve clubs in the league. The Goalkeeper of the Year award has been given out since the league's inaugural season.

Eugene Galekovic has won the award four times, the most times out of all keepers. Michael Theo is the next-most successful, with three awards.

== Winners ==
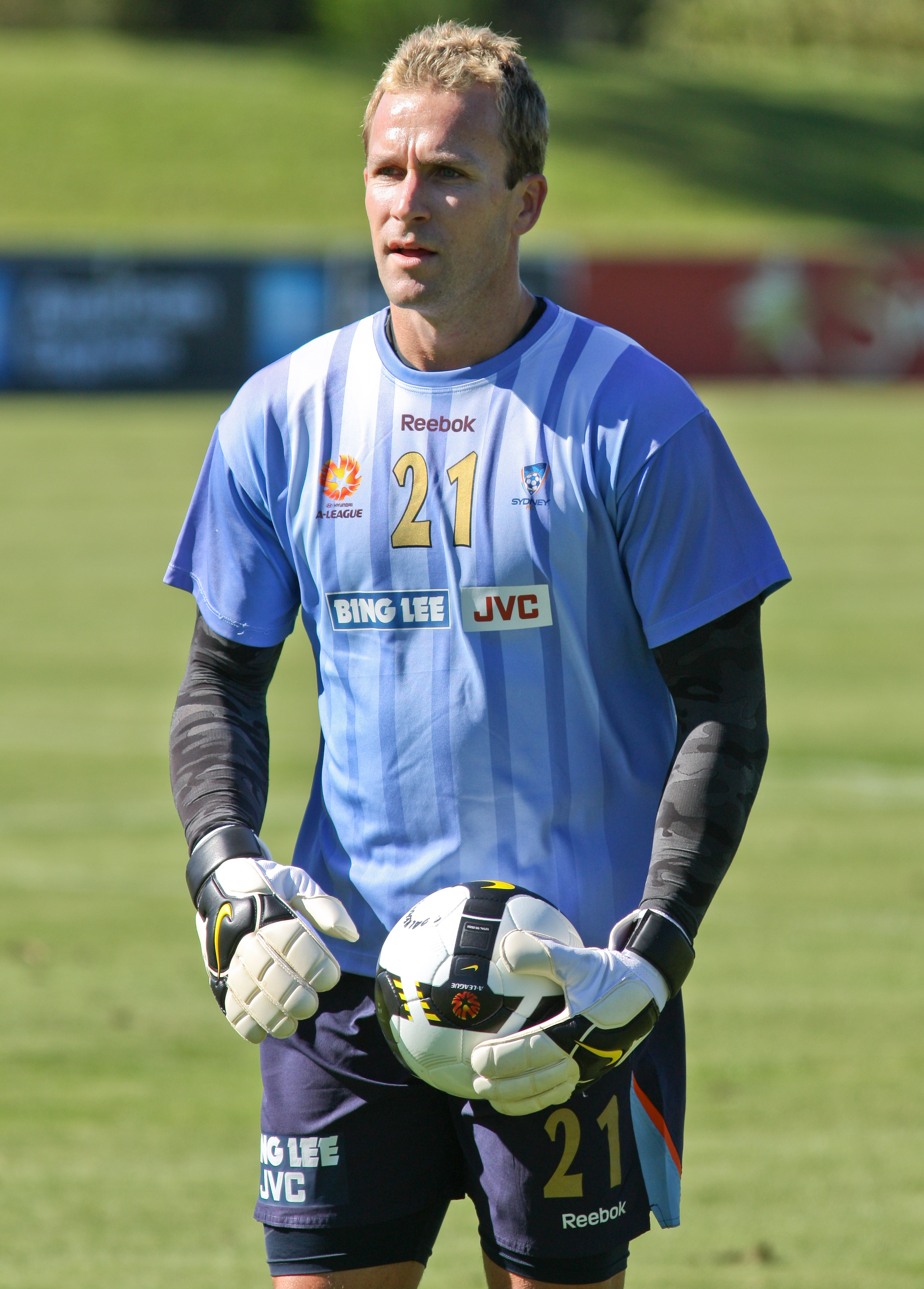
Clint Bolton won the inaugural A-League Goalkeeper of the Year award in 2005.

Key
Player (X)	Name of the player and number of times they had won the award at that point (if more than one)
§	Denotes the club were A-League premiers in the same season

A-League Goalkeeper of the Year winners
Season	Player	Nationality	Club	Clean sheets
2005–06	Clint Bolton	Australia	Sydney FC	5
2006–07	Michael Theoklitos	Australia	Melbourne Victory^{§}	10
2007–08	Michael Theoklitos (2)	Australia	Melbourne Victory	6
2008–09	Eugene Galekovic	Australia	Adelaide United	10
2009–10	Eugene Galekovic (2)	Australia	Adelaide United	6
2010–11	Michael Theoklitos (3)	Australia	Brisbane Roar^{§}	12
2011–12	Mathew Ryan	Australia	Central Coast Mariners^{§}	8
2012–13	Ante Covic	Australia	Western Sydney Wanderers^{§}	11
2013–14	Eugene Galekovic (3)	Australia	Adelaide United	8
2014–15	Eugene Galekovic (4)	Australia	Adelaide United	7
2015–16	Thomas Sørensen	Denmark	Melbourne City	4
2016–17	Danny Vukovic	Australia	Sydney FC^{§}	15
2017–18	Jamie Young	England	Brisbane Roar	5
2018–19	Filip Kurto	Poland	Wellington Phoenix	4
2019–20	Andrew Redmayne	Australia	Sydney FC^{§}	8
2020–21	Mark Birighitti	Australia	Central Coast Mariners	8
2020–21	Andrew Redmayne (2)	Australia	Sydney FC	9
2021–22	Mark Birighitti (2)	Australia	Central Coast Mariners	9
2022–23	Lawrence Thomas	Australia	Western Sydney Wanderers	10
2023–24	Alex Paulsen	New Zealand	Wellington Phoenix	11
2024–25	Alex Paulsen	New Zealand	Auckland FC^{§}	12
2025–26	Harrison Devenish-Meares	Australia	Sydney FC	11

== Awards won by nationality ==
Country	Total
Australia	17
New Zealand	2
Denmark	1
England	1
Poland	1

== Awards won by club ==
Club	Total
Sydney FC	5
Adelaide United	4
Central Coast Mariners	3
Brisbane Roar	2
Melbourne Victory	2
Wellington Phoenix	2
Western Sydney Wanderers	2
Auckland FC	1
Melbourne City	1
