= Kasey Bos =

Australian soccer player (born 2004)

- Bos training with Australia in 2026

Personal information
- Date of birth: 8 May 2004 (age 22)
- Place of birth: Melbourne, Australia
- Height: 1.80 m (5 ft 11 in)
- Position: Left-back

Team information
- Current team: Excelsior (on loan from Mainz 05)
- Number: 12

Youth career
- Point Cook
- Melbourne City
- 2021–2023: Melbourne Victory

Senior career*
Years	Team	Apps	(Gls)
2023–2024	Melbourne Victory NPL	27	(3)
2023–2025	Melbourne Victory	30	(4)
2025–	Mainz 05 II	14	(0)
2025–	Mainz 05	0	(0)
2026–	→ Excelsior (loan)	3	(0)

International career^{‡}
2026–	Australia	1	(0)
- * Club domestic league appearances and goals as of 16 May 2026 ‡ National team caps and goals as of 13 November 2026

Kasey Bos (born 8 May 2004) is an Australian professional soccer player who plays as a left-back for Eredivisie club Excelsior, on loan from Bundesliga club Mainz 05, and the Australia national team.

== Club career ==
After playing a key role in Melbourne Victory Youth's promotion from NPL3 to the second tier of Victorian football, on 8 February 2024, Bos was elevated to Melbourne Victory's senior squad.

Bos made his A-League debut with Melbourne Victory as a substitute against the Central Coast Mariners on 25 February 2024.

In Melbourne Victory's elimination final against Melbourne City on 5 May 2024, with the Victory trailing 1–0 with less than 3 minutes of regulation time remaining, Bos assisted Nishan Velupillay's 88th-minute equalising goal, which sent the match into extra time, with the Victory eventually prevailing 3–2 in a penalty shootout.

Bos scored his debut first-team goal with Melbourne Victory in an Australia Cup match against Moreton City Excelsior on 14 September 2024, with Bos scoring the Victory's third goal in an eventual 4–0 win.

Bos scored his debut A-League goal on 1 March 2025, a last-minute 97th-minute equaliser against Brisbane Roar, which helped the Victory secure a 1–1 draw.

In June 2025, Bos signed for Bundesliga club Mainz 05 on a four-year contract. On 3 June 2026, he was loaned to Excelsior in the Netherlands for the 2026–27 season.

== International career ==
In June 2025 Bos was called up by the Australian national team for their June FIFA World Cup qualifiers against Japan and Saudi Arabia.

== Personal life ==
Bos is the younger brother of Jordan Bos of Feyenoord, whom he played alongside at Melbourne City FC Youth.

== Career statistics ==
As of 16 November 2026

Appearances and goals by club, season and competition
Club	Season	League			National cup (Note: Includes Australia Cup)		Other		Total	
Club	Season	Division	Apps	Goals	Apps	Goals	Apps	Goals	Apps	Goals
Melbourne Victory Youth	2023	NPL Victoria 3	16	3	—		—		16	3
Melbourne Victory Youth	2024	Victorian Premier League 1	11	0	—		—		11	0
Melbourne Victory Youth	Total		27	3	0	0	0	0	27	3
Melbourne Victory	2023–24	A-League Men	4	0	1	0	—		5	0
Melbourne Victory	2024–25	A-League Men	30	4	4	1	—		30	5
Melbourne Victory	Total		30	4	5	1	0	0	35	5
1. FSV Mainz 05 II	2025–26	Regionalliga Südwest	14	0	—		—		14	0
1. FSV Mainz 05 II	2026–27	Regionalliga Südwest	0	0	—		—		0	0
1. FSV Mainz 05 II	Total		14	0	0	0	0	0	14	0
Excelsior Rotterdam (loan)	2026–27	Eredivisie	8	0	0	0	—		8	0
Career total			79	7	5	1	0	0	84	8
