= Alex Grant (soccer) =

Australian soccer player (born 1994)

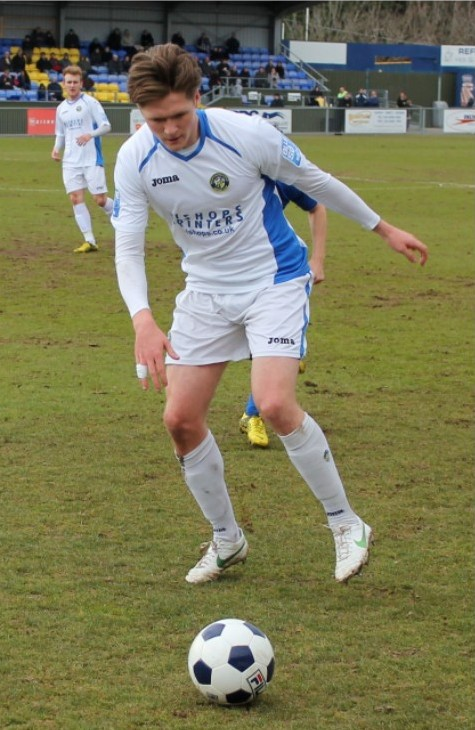
- Grant playing for Havant & Waterlooville in 2013

Personal information
- Full name: Alexander Ian Grant
- Date of birth: 23 January 1994 (age 32)
- Place of birth: Manchester, England
- Height: 1.91 m (6 ft 3 in)
- Positions: Centre back; left back

Team information
- Current team: Newcastle Jets
- Number: 2

Youth career
- ECU Joondalup
- 2010–2012: Portsmouth

Senior career*
Years	Team	Apps	(Gls)
2012–2013	Portsmouth	0	(0)
2012	→ Eastleigh (loan)	1	(0)
2013	→ Havant & Waterlooville (loan)	18	(1)
2013–2015	Stoke City	0	(0)
2014–2015	→ Macclesfield Town (loan)	25	(2)
2015–2020	Perth Glory	86	(3)
2021–2023	Pohang Steelers	75	(8)
2024	Tianjin Jinmen Tiger	10	(1)
2025–2026	Sydney FC	26	(1)
2026–	Newcastle Jets	0	(0)

International career
2012	Australia U17		
- * Club domestic league appearances and goals as of 20 July 2026

Alexander Ian Grant (born 23 January 1994) is a professional soccer player who plays as a defender for A-League Men club Newcastle Jets. Born in England, he has represented Australia at youth level.

== Club career ==
=== Portsmouth ===
Grant signed a two-year scholarship with Portsmouth in July 2010. He progressed through reserve and academy sides, and appeared on the bench against Nottingham Forest, on 28 April 2012. In his next season, on 14 August, he made his professional debut, acting as a starter in a Football League Cup match against Plymouth Argyle.

On 20 December, he was loaned to Eastleigh in a one-month deal. He made his debut on New Year's Day, against Salisbury City.

On 24 January 2013, he joined Havant & Waterlooville on a one-month loan deal. He joined Hawks as a replacement for fellow Portsmouth player Dan Butler, who gained first team action at Pompey. He made his Hawks debut two days later, in a 0–0 away draw against Dorchester Town. He scored his first goal for Hawks on 16 April, against Dover Athletic.

=== Stoke City ===
On 9 May, despite his loan being successful, he was released by Pompey. Following his release by Portsmouth, Grant signed for Stoke City who fought off competition from Everton. On 30 August 2014 Grant joined Macclesfield Town on loan. He scored his first goal for the Silkmen in an FA Cup tie against Wrexham. Grant was released by Stoke at the end of the 2014–15 season.

=== Perth Glory ===
Grant returned to Australia in June 2015 and joined A-League side Perth Glory.

=== Pohang Steelers ===
In December 2020, with 3 seasons left on his Perth Glory contract, Grant joined Pohang Steelers on an undisclosed fee transfer.

=== Tianjin Jinmen Tiger ===
On 1 February 2024, Grant joined Chinese Super League club Tianjin Jinmen Tiger.

=== Sydney FC ===
On 1 February 2025, Grant returned to Australia, signing with Sydney FC until the end of the 2024–25 season. On 19 February 2025, his debut for the club came in a 3–2 win away to Thai League 1 side Bangkok United in the round of 16 of the AFC Champions League Two. His first league appearance for Sydney was on 1 March 2025, against Macarthur FC. Grant would score his first goal for the club in the Champions League Two against Jeonbuk Hyundai Motors, his goal would be the clubs first of the evening, kickstarting a 3–2 comeback win.

On 28 May 2025, Grant would sign a two-year contract extension with Sydney FC, contracting him with the club until the end of the 2026–27 season.

Alex mutually terminated his contract with Sydney FC during pre-season of the 2026–27 season.

=== Newcastle Jets ===
Grant signed a one-year deal with the Newcastle Jets at the beginning of the 2026–27 season.

== International career ==
Despite being born in England, Grant was called to play for Australia U17. He was on the provisional 35-man squad for the 2011 FIFA U-17 World Cup.

Grant was announced in the squad to face Indonesia and China in the 2026 FIFA World Cup third round qualifiers in March 2025.

== Career statistics ==
As of match played 21 July 2026

Club	Season	League			Cup		Continental		Other		Total	
Club	Season	Division	Apps	Goals	Apps	Goals	Apps	Goals	Apps	Goals	Apps	Goals
Portsmouth	2012–13	League One	0	0	0	0	—		1	0	1	0
Eastleigh (loan)	2012–13	Conference South	1	0	0	0	—		—		1	0
Havant & Waterlooville (loan)	2012–13	Conference South	18	1	0	0	—		—		18	1
Stoke City	2014–15	Premier League	0	0	0	0	—		—		0	0
Macclesfield Town (loan)	2014–15	Conference Premier	25	2	2	1	—		1	0	28	3
Perth Glory	2015–16	A-League	22	1	1	0	—		—		23	1
Perth Glory	2016–17	A-League	10	1	1	0	—		—		11	1
Perth Glory	2017–18	A-League	20	0	1	0	—		—		21	0
Perth Glory	2018–19	A-League	11	0	1	0	—		—		12	0
Perth Glory	2019–20	A-League	23	1	0	0	1	0	—		24	1
Perth Glory	Total		86	3	4	0	1	0	1	0	91	3
Pohang Steelers	2021	K League 1	16	2	0	0	9	1	—		25	3
Pohang Steelers	2022	K League 1	27	2	2	0	—		—		29	2
Pohang Steelers	2023	K League 1	32	4	2	0	4	0	—		38	4
Pohang Steelers	Total		75	8	4	0	13	1	—		92	9
Tianjin Jinmen Tiger	2024	Chinese Super League	10	1	1	0	—		—		11	1
Sydney FC	2024–25	A-League Men	4	0	—		3	1	—		7	1
Sydney FC	2025–26	A-League Men	22	1	2	0	—		—		24	1
Sydney FC	Total		26	1	2	0	0	0	0	0	31	2
Newcastle Jets FC	2026–27	A-League Men	0	0	1	0	0	0	—		1	0
Career total			241	16	14	1	17	2	2	0	274	19

== Honours ==
Perth Glory

- A-League Premiership: 2018–19

Pohang Steelers

- AFC Champions League runner-up: 2021
- KFA Cup winner : 2023

Individual

- K League 1 Best XI: 2023
