= Patryk Klimala =

Polish footballer (born 1998)

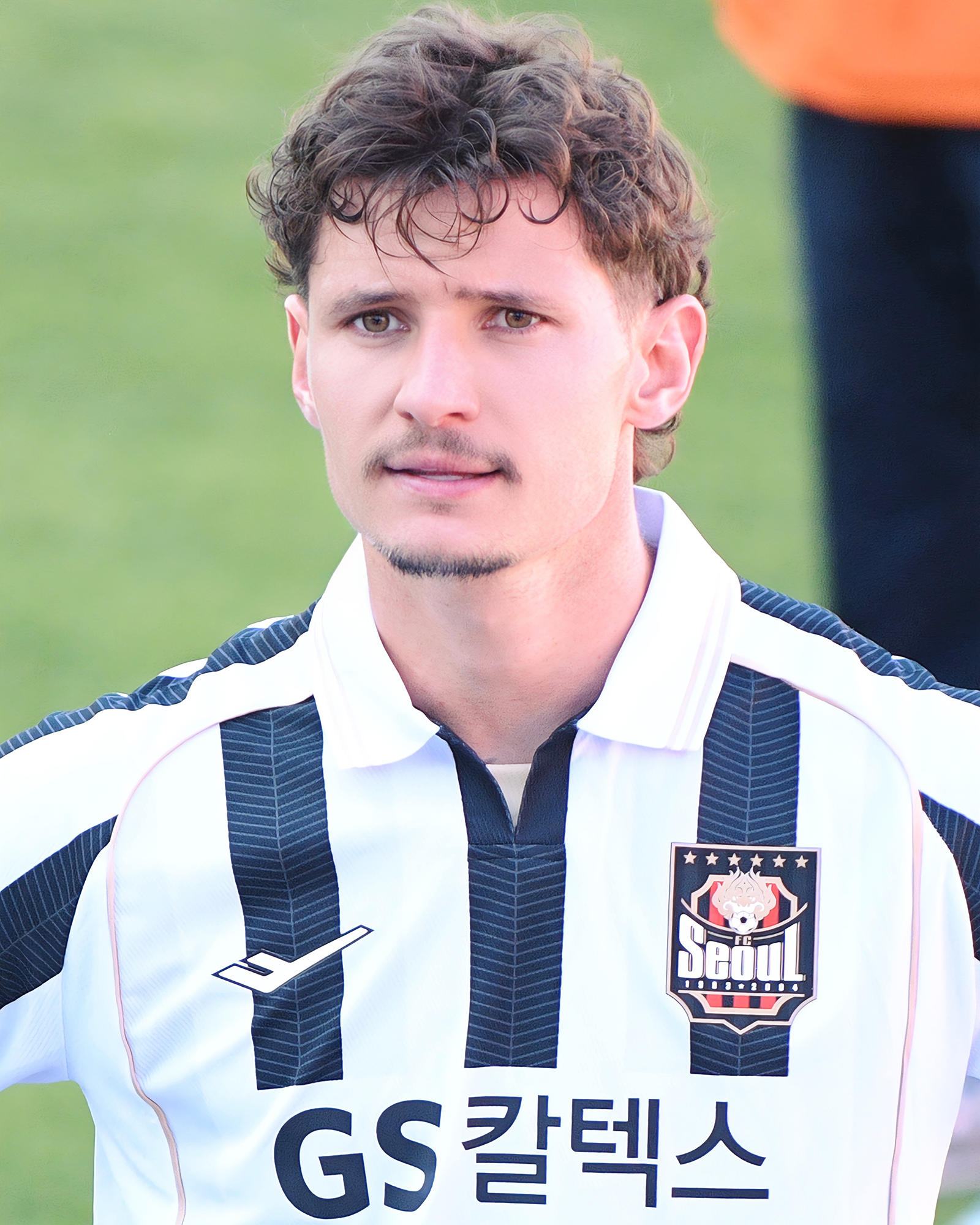
- Klimala with FC Seoul in 2026

Personal information
- Date of birth: 5 August 1998 (age 28)
- Place of birth: Świdnica, Poland
- Height: 1.83 m (6 ft 0 in)
- Position: Striker

Team information
- Current team: FC Seoul
- Number: 9

Youth career
- –2012: Zjednoczeni Żarów
- 2012–2014: Lechia Dzierżoniów
- 2014–2016: Legia Warsaw

Senior career*
Years	Team	Apps	(Gls)
2015–2016	→ Lechia Dzierżoniów (loan)	7	(1)
2016–2020	Jagiellonia Białystok	42	(8)
2017–2018	→ Wigry Suwałki (loan)	27	(13)
2020–2021	Celtic	19	(3)
2021–2022	New York Red Bulls	57	(13)
2023	Hapoel Be'er Sheva	19	(4)
2023–2025	Śląsk Wrocław	11	(0)
2024	Śląsk Wrocław II	4	(4)
2024–2025	→ Sydney FC (loan)	21	(11)
2025–	FC Seoul	33	(17)

International career
2016	Poland U19	2	(0)
2018–2019	Poland U20	3	(1)
2019–2020	Poland U21	10	(4)
- * Club domestic league appearances and goals as of 09:43, 18 October 2026 (UTC)

Patryk Klimala (born 5 August 1998) is a Polish professional footballer who plays as a forward for K League 1 club FC Seoul.

== Club career ==
=== Early career ===
Born in Świdnica, Klimala began his career in Żarów about twelve kilometers north of Świdnica. He played for the club until 2012 when he went on to Lechia Dzierżoniów. From here, Klimala moved to Legia Warsaw's youth boarding school in 2014. Legia loaned the attacker back to his previous club Lechia from 2015 to 2016. At Lechia, he played in the III liga, appearing in seven matches and scoring one goal.

=== Jagiellonia Białystok ===
Jagiellonia Białystok signed Klimala in July 2016. There, he played for the under-19 team for the first few months. Klimala made his first team debut for Jagiellonia on 25 September 2016, being subbed in for Przemysław Frankowski in the 92nd minute against Korona Kielce. He played two more games that season, against Lech Poznań and Arka Gdynia, being subbed in late in the game in both matches.

==== Loan to Wigry Suwałki ====
Klimala was loaned to I liga side Wigry Suwałki for the 2017–18 season. He scored his first goal for the club on 21 October 2017 in a 2–2 draw with Bytovia Bytów. He ended the season as the team's top scorer with 13 goals in 27 games.

==== Return to Jagiellonia ====
Following his season on loan, Klimala returned to Jagiellonia. He made his debut in the UEFA Europa League against Rio Ave on 26 July 2018 in a 1–0 victory, he was subbed in the 83rd minute. Klimala got his first chance in the starting eleven against Piast Gliwice on 19 August 2018. He played 63 minutes before being subbed out for Karol Swiderski, with Jagiellonia winning 2–1.

On 4 December 2018, Klimala scored his first goal with Jagiellonia in a 2–0 victory over Arka Gdynia in the Polish Cup. On 12 March 2019, Klimala scored two goals in a 2–0 victory over Odra Opole, helping Jagiellonia advance to the semi-finals of the Polish Cup. Klimala scored his first goal in the top flight Ekstraklasa on 6 April 2019 in a 2–1 victory over Zagłębie Sosnowiec.

=== Celtic ===
On 14 January 2020, Klimala signed a four-and-a-half-year deal with Celtic. The transfer fee was reported for £3.5 million. He scored the first goal of his Celtic career on 16 July 2020, in a pre-season friendly 1–1 draw against Nice in Lyon, France. He scored his first competitive goal for Celtic in a 5–1 win over Hamilton Academical on 2 August 2020.

=== New York Red Bulls ===
On 22 April 2021, Klimala signed a four-year contract with MLS side New York Red Bulls as a young designated player. On 23 June 2021, Klimala scored his first goal for New York in a 3-2 loss to New England Revolution. Klimala ended his first season with New York appearing in 30 matches and leading the team in scoring with 8 goals and 7 assists.

On 26 February 2022, Klimala scored New York's first goal of the season in a 3-1 victory over San Jose Earthquakes in the opening match of the season. On 5 March 2022, Klimala assisted on three Lewis Morgan first half goals to help New York to a 4-1 victory over Toronto FC. On 30 April 2022, Klimala scored two second half goals to help New York to a 2-1 victory over Chicago Fire SC. On 18 May 2022 Klimala scored in injury time to help New York a to 3-3 draw with Chicago Fire SC. On 25 May 2022 Klimale scored a goal and assisted another in a 3-1 victory for New York over Charlotte FC as his team advanced to the quarterfinals of the 2022 U.S. Open Cup.

=== Hapoel Be'er Sheva ===
On 29 January 2023, Klimala moved to Israeli side Hapoel Be'er Sheva on a three-and-a-half-year deal. In late October that year, following the breakout of the Gaza war, Klimala left Israel and returned to his native Poland, where he started training at Śląsk Wrocław's facilities. On 3 November, he terminated his contact with Hapoel by mutual consent.

=== Śląsk Wrocław ===
On 5 November 2023, Klimala was unveiled as Śląsk's new player at half-time of a 2–1 home win against ŁKS Łódź, after signing a contract until June 2027. Due to FIFA transfer regulations, he was unable to feature in an official fixture for Śląsk until the start of 2024.

After a goalless 2023–24 campaign, Klimala was not included in the first team roster for the following season.

==== Loan to Sydney FC ====
On 9 September 2024, Klimala was sent on a season-long loan to A-League club Sydney FC with an option to buy. On 19 October 2024, Klimala scored the winner for Sydney FC in a 2–1 Sydney Derby win over Western Sydney Wanderers on round 1 of the 2024–25 A-League Men at Commbank Stadium in front of 27,496 fans.

=== FC Seoul ===
On 2 June 2025, Klimala was recruited by K League 1 club FC Seoul as the first Polish player in the team's history. In his debut on 17 June 2025, he assisted a goal for Moon Seon-min in a 1–1 league draw against Gangwon FC.

== International career ==
Klimala has represented Poland at under-19 youth international level and made his international debut against Slovakia U19 in November 2016. He made his under-20 debut against England U20 in March 2018, scoring his first international goal against the same opponents exactly one year later. In March 2019, Klimala made his under-21 debut against Serbia U21.

== Career statistics ==
As of match played 17 October 2026

Appearances and goals by club, season and competition
Club	Season	League			National cup (Note: Includes Polish Cup, Scottish Cup, U.S. Open Cup, Korean FA Cup)		League cup (Note: Includes Scottish League Cup)		Continental		Total	
Club	Season	Division	Apps	Goals	Apps	Goals	Apps	Goals	Apps	Goals	Apps	Goals
Lechia Dzierżoniów (loan)	2016–17	III liga, group I	7	1	0	0	—		—		7	1
Jagiellonia Białystok	2016–17	Ekstraklasa	3	0	0	0	—		—		3	0
Jagiellonia Białystok	2018–19	Ekstraklasa	22	1	6	3	—		1 (Note: Appearance in UEFA Europa League)	0	29	4
Jagiellonia Białystok	2019–20	Ekstraklasa	17	7	1	0	—		—		18	7
Jagiellonia Białystok	Total		42	8	7	3	—		1	0	50	11
Wigry Suwałki (loan)	2017–18	I liga	27	13	1	0	—		—		28	13
Celtic	2019–20	Scottish Premiership	2	0	2	0	0	0	0	0	4	0
Celtic	2020–21	Scottish Premiership	17	3	0	0	1	0	6 (Note: One appearance in UEFA Champions League, five appearances in UEFA Europa League)	0	24	3
Celtic	Total		19	3	2	0	1	0	6	0	28	3
New York Red Bulls	2021	MLS	29	8	0	0	—		—		29	8
New York Red Bulls	2022	MLS	28	5	4	1	—		—		32	6
New York Red Bulls	Total		57	13	4	1	—		—		61	14
Hapoel Be'er Sheva	2022–23	Israeli Premier League	15	3	—		—		—		15	3
Hapoel Be'er Sheva	2023–24	Israeli Premier League	4	1	0	0	—		4 (Note: Appearances in UEFA Conference League)	0	8	1
Hapoel Be'er Sheva	Total		19	4	0	0	—		4	0	23	4
Śląsk Wrocław	2023–24	Ekstraklasa	11	0	—		—		—		11	0
Śląsk Wrocław II	2024–25	III liga, group II	4	4	—		—		—		4	4
Sydney FC (loan)	2024–25	A-League Men	21	11	—		—		10 (Note: Appearances in AFC Champions League Two)	6	31	17
FC Seoul	2025	K League 1	4	1	1	0	—		0	0	5	1
FC Seoul	2026	K League 1	29	16	0	0	—		0	0	29	16
FC Seoul	Total		33	17	1	0	—		0	0	34	17
Career total			240	74	14	4	1	0	21	6	276	84

== Honours ==
Celtic

- Scottish Cup: 2019–20

FC Seoul

- K League 1: 2026

Individual

- Ekstraklasa Young Player of the Month: October 2019
