= Léo Sena =

Brazilian footballer

Personal information
- Full name: Leonardo de Souza Sena
- Date of birth: 31 December 1995 (age 30)
- Place of birth: São Paulo, Brazil
- Height: 1.75 m (5 ft 9 in)
- Position: Midfielder

Youth career
- São Paulo
- Paraná
- Diadema
- 2014–2015: Rio Claro
- 2015: Goiás

Senior career*
Years	Team	Apps	(Gls)
2016–2020	Goiás	165	(1)
2020–2021	Atlético Mineiro	3	(0)
2020–2021	→ Spezia (loan)	16	(0)
2021–2022	Spezia	0	(0)
2022–2023	Goiás	0	(0)
2023	Lokomotiv Plovdiv	9	(0)
2024	Água Santa	18	(0)
2024–2025	Sydney FC	20	(1)
- * Club domestic league appearances and goals as of 14 May 2025

Leonardo "Léo" de Souza Sena (born 31 December 1995) is a Brazilian professional footballer who most recently played for Sydney FC in the A-League Men.

== Club career ==
Léo Sena was born in São Paulo, and represented São Paulo, Paraná, Clube Atlético Diadema and Rio Claro as a youth, before joining Goiás in 2015. Promoted to the main squad ahead of the 2016 season, he made his senior debut on 14 February of that year by coming on as a second-half substitute for Carlos Eduardo in a 2–2 Campeonato Goiano home draw against Atlético Goianiense.

Léo Sena scored his first senior goal on 8 May 2016, netting the opener in a 1–1 home draw against Anápolis, for the state league's final; his side went on to win the competition on penalties. He made his Série B debut for the club five days later, starting in a 1–0 away win against Tupi.

On 13 August 2016, Léo Sena renewed his contract with the club until the end of 2019. During the 2018 campaign, he contributed with 13 appearances as his side achieved promotion to Série A.

On 2 June 2020, Goiás announced that they had reached an agreement with Atlético Mineiro for the transfer of Léo Sena for a R$4 million fee. Four months later, he joined Spezia in the Italian Serie A on a season-long loan with the option to buy. On 2 June 2021, Sena signed a three-year contract with Spezia for €1,250,000.

In July 2023, Sena joined Bulgarian club Lokomotiv Plovdiv on a three-year contract.

On 16 August 2024, Sena signed a 2-year contract with A-League Men club Sydney FC. He made his competitive debut for the club on 19 September against Hong Kong club Eastern during the 2024–25 AFC Champions League Two. Sena scored his first goal for the club in 3–2 win against Brisbane Roar.

Following his omission from Sydney FC's squad during the club's 2025 Australia Cup campaign, club management confirmed to supporters during a fan forum that Sena was no longer part of their plans. Sena later mutually terminated his contact with the club on 2 September 2025.

== Career statistics ==
As of match played 3 May 2025

Appearances and goals by club, season and competition
Club	Season	League			State League		Cup		Continental		Other		Total	
Club	Season	Division	Apps	Goals	Apps	Goals	Apps	Goals	Apps	Goals	Apps	Goals	Apps	Goals
Goiás	2016	Série B	35	0	6	1	1	0	—		—		42	1
Goiás	2017	Série B	28	0	15	0	6	0	—		—		49	0
Goiás	2018	Série B	13	0	14	0	6	0	—		—		33	0
Goiás	2019	Série A	33	0	15	0	2	0	—		2 (Note: Appearance(s) in Copa Verde)	0	52	0
Goiás	2020	Série A	0	0	6	0	2	0	1 (Note: Appearance(s) in Copa Sudamericana)	0	—		9	0
Goiás	Total		109	0	56	1	17	0	1	0	2	0	185	1
Atlético Mineiro	2020	Série A	1	0	2	0	—		—		—		3	0
Spezia (loan)	2020–21	Serie A	16	0	—		3	0	—		—		19	0
Spezia	2021–22	Serie A	0	0	—		0	0	—		—		0	0
Spezia	Total		16	0	—		3	0	—		—		19	0
Lokomotiv Plovdiv	2023–24	First League	13	0	—		1	0	—		—		14	0
Água Santa	2024	Série D	13	0	5	0	0	0	—		—		18	0
Sydney FC	2024–25	A-League Men	20	1	—		0	0	11 (Note: Appearance(s) in AFC Champions League Two)	0	—		31	1
Sydney FC	2025–26	A-League Men	0	0	—		0	0	—		—		0	0
Career total			172	1	63	1	21	0	12	0	2	0	270	2

== Honours ==
Goiás

- Campeonato Goiano: 2016, 2017, 2018

Atlético Mineiro

- Campeonato Mineiro: 2020
