= Arthur Diles =

Australian soccer manager

Personal information
- Full name: Athanasios Arthur Diles
- Date of birth: 22 April 1982 (age 44)
- Place of birth: Sydney, Australia
- Position: Centre back

Team information
- Current team: Cong An Ho Chi Minh City (head coach)

Senior career*
Years	Team	Apps	(Gls)
1994–2000	Sydney Olympic FC		
2000	Sydney United 58 FC		
2000–2002	Parramatta Power SC		
2002	K.V. Mechelen		
2004–2005	Sydney Olympic FC		
2005	Crawley Town F.C.		
2006	Sydney Olympic FC		
2007	Western Suburbs SC		

Managerial career
- 2010–2012: AEK Athens F.C. (academy)
- 2012–2013: NSW Institute of Sport (youth)
- 2013–2015: Sydney Olympic (technical director)
- 2015–2020: Western Sydney Wanderers Youth
- 2018–2019: Western Sydney Wanderers (assistant)
- 2020–2021: Xanthi (assistant)
- 2021–2023: Newcastle Jets (assistant)
- 2023–2024: Melbourne Victory (assistant)
- 2024–2026: Melbourne Victory
- 2026–: Cong An Ho Chi Minh City
- * Club domestic league appearances and goals

Athanasios Arthur Diles (born 22 April 1982) is an Australian soccer manager and former player. He is currently the head coach of the V.League 1 club, Cong An Ho Chi Minh City.

== Personal life ==
Diles was born in Sydney. His parents were born in Greece, with his father being from Pylos and his mother from Kiato. As of 2020, he was married and had twin 8-year-old sons.

== Playing career ==
A centre-back, Diles began playing in the academy of Sydney Olympic. He also played in Australia for Sydney United and Parramatta Power, as well as spells in Europe with Crawley Town in English non-league football, and K.V. Mechelen in Belgium. He retired at age 25 due to the decline of the National Soccer League in Australia, and a prospective employer in Europe going bankrupt.

== Managerial career ==
=== Early career ===
Diles began coaching at the academy of AEK Athens F.C. in Greece before taking the under-14 team of the New South Wales Institute of Sport, leading them to a national title in 2013. As technical director of Sydney Olympic, a team based in the Greek Australian community, he signed former Greece international defender Sotirios Kyrgiakos.

At Western Sydney Wanderers, Diles won titles with the under-18 and under-20 teams before becoming manager of the reserve team in the National Premier Leagues and assistant manager of the first team. In September 2020, Diles returned to Greece as assistant manager of Xanthi F.C. after its purchase by Sydney Olympic director Bill Papas; former Australia international Tony Popovic became the manager.

In June 2021, Diles returned to Australia, being named as assistant to Arthur Papas at Newcastle Jets of A-League Men. In July 2023, he moved into the same role at Melbourne Victory, to Popovic and then Patrick Kisnorbo.

=== Melbourne Victory ===
On 16 December 2024, Kisnorbo quit the Victory five days before the local derby against Melbourne City, leaving Diles in temporary charge. His debut was a 1–1 home draw with an equaliser by captain Roderick Miranda. On 24 January 2025, he obtained his first win in his seventh game, winning The Big Blue 2–0 over Sydney FC at Melbourne Rectangular Stadium; a week later he was hired on a permanent basis until the end of the 2025–26 season.

Diles took Melbourne Victory to 5th in the regular season and then the grand final, having defeated premiers Auckland FC in the semi-finals. His team lost the final 1–0 on 31 May 2025 to Melbourne City.

Diles signed 2010 FIFA World Cup winner Juan Mata. He considered the signing to be the highlight of his time at the Victory, and that he had proven wrong the critics who had pointed to Mata's previous form at Western Sydney Wanderers.

Following a lacklustre season where Victory finished fourth in the regular season and were eliminated by Sydney FC in the elimination final, it was reported that Diles would depart the club at the expiration of his contract, with Victory opting not to offer him a new deal. The following day on 19 May, the club officially announced his departure.

=== Cong An Ho Chi Minh City ===
On 15 July 2026, Diles was hired at V.League 1 club Cong An Ho Chi Minh City in Vietnam. He signed a two-year contract.

== Managerial statistics ==
As of match played 22 November 2026

Managerial record by team and tenure
Team	Nat.	From	To	Record					Ref.
Team	Nat.	From	To	G	W	D	L	Win %	Ref.
Melbourne Victory	(Australia)	17 December 2024	19 May 2026	51	20	13	18	39.22	
Cong An Ho Chi Minh City	(Vietnam)	15 July 2026	Present	11	4	2	5	36.36	
Career Total				62	24	15	23	38.71	

== Honours ==
=== Manager ===
Western Sydney Wanderers Youth

- National Youth League Champion: 2017–18
