= Jaiden Kucharski =

Australian soccer player (born 2002)

Personal information
- Date of birth: 25 June 2002 (age 24)
- Place of birth: Westmead, New South Wales, Australia
- Position: Winger

Team information
- Current team: Perth Glory
- Number: 9

Youth career
- Glenwood Redbacks
- FNSW SAP
- Blacktown City
- 2014–2024: Sydney FC Youth

Senior career*
Years	Team	Apps	(Gls)
2018–2024	Sydney FC NPL	56	(31)
2022–2025	Sydney FC	62	(7)
2025–	Perth Glory	19	(3)

International career
2017–2018	Australia U17	9	(3)
- * Club domestic league appearances and goals as of 29 April 2026

Jaiden Kucharski (/kutʃɑrski/ kə-CHAR-SKEE, Polish: [kuˈxarskʲi]; born 25 June 2002) is an Australian professional footballer who plays as a winger for A-League Men club Perth Glory.

== Career ==
=== Sydney FC ===
Having joined Sydney FC's youth academy as a 12 year old in 2014, Kucharski progressed through the age groups to make his NSW NPL1 debut in 2018 in a 5–0 loss to former National Soccer League heavyweights Wollongong Wolves. Kucharski signed a two-year scholarship contract with the Sydney A-League Men's side after coming through the academy ranks and performing well in the National Premier League side, having scored 19 goals in the 2022 NPL season. He made his competitive debut for the senior men's team in the 2022 Australia Cup Round of 32 as a substitute against rival A-League side Central Coast Mariners at Leichhardt Oval, and scored in the penalty shootout which saw Sydney win and progress to the Round of 16.

On 13 August 2023, Kucharski was included in the youth-bolstered Australia Cup squad to take on Central Coast Mariners at WIN Illawarra Stadium in Wollongong. The game provided six goals all together, with Sydney FC prevailing to win 10–9 on penalties. In the 122nd minute, Kucharski received the ball on the wing and dribbled past numerous Central Coast defenders and curled a shot into the bottom corner to send the game to penalties.

After three seasons in Sydney FC's senior team, he departed his boyhood club at the end of the 2024–25 season to "continue his professional development".

=== Western United ===
Kucharski signed a two-year contract to join Western United ahead of the 2025–26 A-League season. However, Western United were subjected to a FIFA registration ban due to an unresolved financial dispute with former player, Aleksandar Prijovic. As a result, Kucharski was ineligible to play for Western United in their first match in the 2025 Australia Cup. On 8 August, a month to the day of the announcement of Kucharski's signing, Western United's license to play in the A-League was withdrawn by Football Australia, due to their financial troubles, throwing their future into doubt. On 19 August, while Western United were still in the process of lodging an appeal on the decision, Kucharski mutually parted ways with the club, having never represented or been registered at the club.

=== Perth Glory ===
On 21 August 2025, Perth Glory announced the signing of Kucharski on a two-year deal.

== Career statistics ==
As of match played 23 November 2024

Club	Season	League (Note: A-League statistics include final series matches)			Australia Cup		Continental		Total	
Club	Season	Division	Apps	Goals	Apps	Goals	Apps	Goals	Apps	Goals
Sydney FC	2021–22	A-League Men	0	0	0	0	0	0	0	0
Sydney FC	2022–23	A-League Men	14	0	2	0	—		16	0
Sydney FC	2023–24	A-League Men	24	4	4	1	—		28	5
Sydney FC	2024–25	A-League Men	3	1	1	0	1 (Note: Appearance in AFC Champions League 2)	0	5	1
Career total			41	5	7	1	1	0	49	6

== Honours ==
Sydney FC

- Australia Cup: 2023

Individual

- National Premier Leagues NSW Men's Player of the Year: 2022

== Personal life ==
Kucharski is of Polish descent. His father and his grandparents were born in Kraków.
