= Anas Ouahim =

German-Moroccan footballer (born 1997)

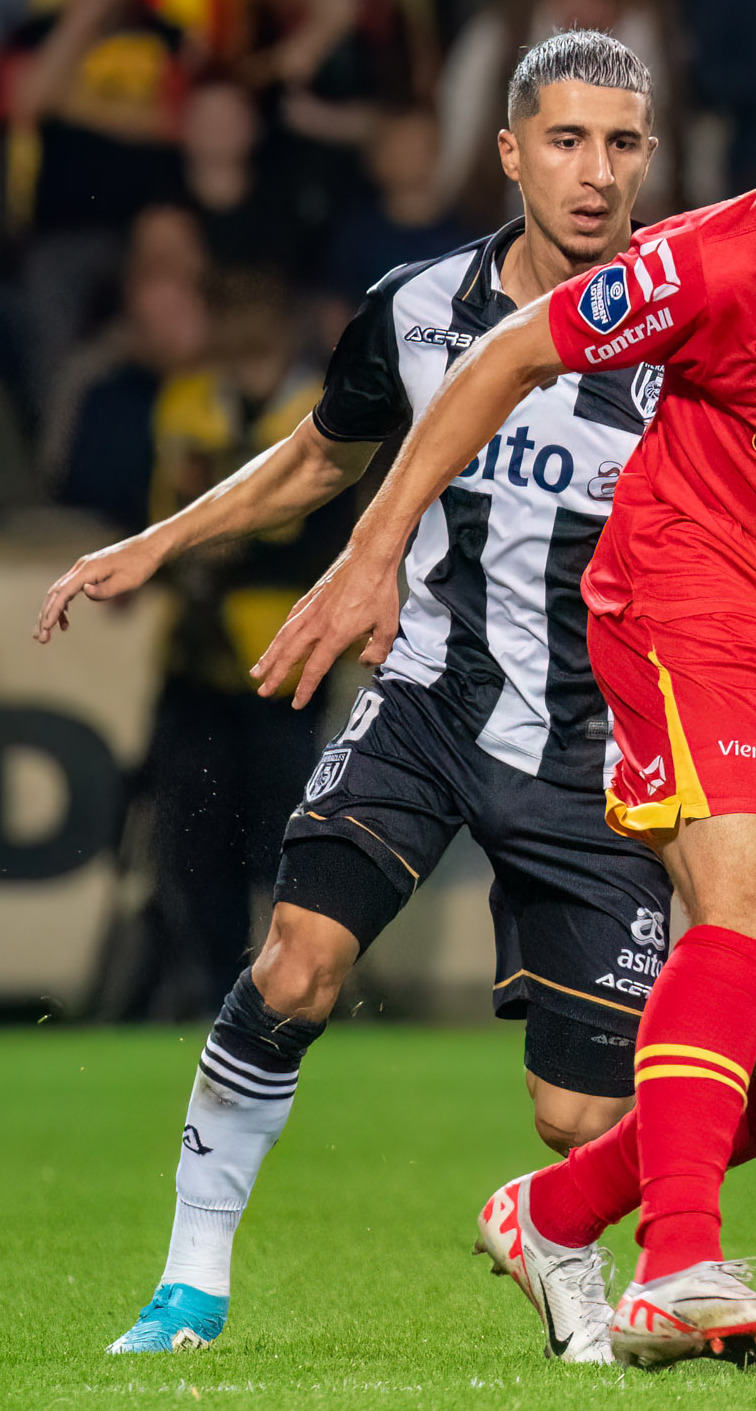
- Ouahim with Heracles Almelo in 2023

Personal information
- Date of birth: 23 September 1997 (age 29)
- Place of birth: Leverkusen, Germany
- Height: 1.75 m (5 ft 9 in)
- Position: Attacking midfielder

Team information
- Current team: Al Khaldiya

Youth career
- –2012: SV Schlebusch
- 2012–2016: 1. FC Köln

Senior career*
Years	Team	Apps	(Gls)
2016–2018	1. FC Köln II	53	(11)
2017–2018	1. FC Köln	1	(0)
2018–2020	VfL Osnabrück	58	(5)
2020–2022	SV Sandhausen	16	(0)
2021	→ 1. FC Kaiserslautern (loan)	16	(0)
2022–2024	Heracles Almelo	57	(10)
2024	→ Sheriff Tiraspol (loan)	5	(0)
2024–2025	Sydney FC	22	(1)
2025-	Al Khaldiya	0	(0)

International career
2019	Morocco U23	1	(0)
- * Club domestic league appearances and goals as of 13 August 2025 (UTC)

Anas Ouahim (born 23 September 1997) is a professional footballer who plays as an attacking midfielder for Al Khaldiya. Born in Germany, Ouahim represents Morocco internationally.

== Club career ==
=== Europe ===
In May 2018, VfL Osnabrück announced Ouahim would join the club for the 2018–19 season from 1. FC Köln. He signed a two-year contract until 2020.

On 31 January 2021, Ouahim signed a 2.5-year contract with Heracles Almelo in Eredivisie.

In March 2024, Ouahim joined Moldovan Super Liga club Sheriff Tiraspol on loan until the end of the calendar year.

=== Sydney FC ===
On 9 July 2024 Ouahim signed a 2-year deal with Australian A-League side Sydney FC.

== International career ==
Ouahim was born in Germany and is of Moroccan descent. Ouahim represented the Morocco U23s in a 1–1 tie with the Mali U23s on 8 September 2019.

== Style of play ==
Ouahim has been described as a very technical player who creates goal scoring opportunities and has an eye for goal.
