= A-League Men transfers for 2024–25 season =

Australian soccer season transfers

This is a list of Australian soccer transfers for the 2024–25 A-League Men. Only moves featuring at least one A-League Men club are listed.

Clubs were able to sign players at any time, but many transfers will only officially go through on 1 July because the majority of player contracts finish on 30 June.

== Transfers ==
All players without a flag are Australian. Clubs without a flag are clubs participating in the A-League Men.

=== Pre-season ===
Date	Name	Moving from	Moving to
14 November 2023	Nestory Irankunda	Adelaide United	(Germany) Bayern Munich
29 January 2024	(Serbia) Miloš Ninković	Western Sydney Wanderers	Retired
7 April 2024	(Colombia) Ángel Torres	Central Coast Mariners	Unattached
23 April 2024	Leigh Broxham	Melbourne Victory	Retired
25 April 2024	Jason Hoffman	Newcastle Jets	Retired
30 April 2024	Jamie Maclaren	Melbourne City	(India) Mohun Bagan
1 May 2024	Curtis Good	Melbourne City	(Thailand) Buriram United
3 May 2024	(England) Carl Jenkinson	Newcastle Jets	Unattached
8 May 2024	(England) Mark Beevers	Perth Glory	Unattached
8 May 2024	(Curaçao) Darryl Lachman	Perth Glory	Unattached
10 May 2024	Jacob Tratt	Western United	Unattached
10 May 2024	Connor O'Toole	Western United	Unattached
10 May 2024	Nikita Rukavytsya	Western United	Unattached
10 May 2024	Steven Lustica	Western United	Unattached
16 May 2024	(Croatia) Marin Jakoliš	Melbourne City	(France) Angers (end of loan)
16 May 2024	(Brazil) Léo Natel	Melbourne City	(Brazil) Corinthians (end of loan)
16 May 2024	Terry Antonis	Melbourne City	Unattached
16 May 2024	Jordon Hall	Melbourne City	Unattached
16 May 2024	(Chile) Vicente Fernández	Melbourne City	Unattached
17 May 2024	Kai Trewin	Brisbane Roar	Melbourne City
17 May 2024	Nick Ansell	Adelaide United	Unattached
17 May 2024	Harry Van Der Saag	Adelaide United	Brisbane Roar
18 May 2024	(Poland) Oskar Zawada	Wellington Phoenix	Unattached
20 May 2024	Ben Warland	Adelaide United	Brisbane Roar
21 May 2024	Aleksandar Šušnjar	Perth Glory	Newcastle Jets
21 May 2024	(Japan) Hiroshi Ibusuki	Adelaide United	Western United
22 May 2024	Raphael Borges Rodrigues	Macarthur FC	(England) Coventry City
22 May 2024	(England) Jack Rodwell	Sydney FC	Unattached
22 May 2024	(Brazil) Fábio Gomes	Sydney FC	(Brazil) Atlético Mineiro (end of loan)
22 May 2024	(Slovakia) Róbert Mak	Sydney FC	Unattached
22 May 2024	(Brazil) Gabriel Lacerda	Sydney FC	(Brazil) Ceará (end of loan)
25 May 2024	Michael Weier	Newcastle Jets	(Australia) Hume City
26 May 2024	Danny Vukovic	Central Coast Mariners	Retired
27 May 2024	(Scotland) Tom Aldred	Brisbane Roar	Unattached
28 May 2024	Jake McGing	Macarthur FC	Retired
28 May 2024	John Koutroumbis	Perth Glory	(Scotland) Motherwell
28 May 2024	Jayden Gorman	Perth Glory	Unattached
28 May 2024	(Cyprus) Antonis Martis	Perth Glory	Unattached
28 May 2024	(Kenya) Bruce Kamau	Perth Glory	Unattached
28 May 2024	Joshua Rawlins	Perth Glory	(Netherlands) Jong Utrecht (end of loan)
28 May 2024	(Tunisia) Salim Khelifi	Melbourne Victory	Perth Glory (end of loan)
28 May 2024	(Tunisia) Salim Khelifi	Perth Glory	Unattached
28 May 2024	Ali Auglah	Macarthur FC	Unattached
29 May 2024	Josh Risdon	Western United	Perth Glory
29 May 2024	Trent Buhagiar	Newcastle Jets	Unattached
29 May 2024	(France) Jason Berthomier	Newcastle Jets	Unattached
29 May 2024	Daniel Stynes	Newcastle Jets	Unattached
30 May 2024	(New Zealand) Cameron Howieson	(New Zealand) Auckland City	Auckland FC
30 May 2024	(New Zealand) Jesse Randall	(New Zealand) Wellington Olympic	Auckland FC
30 May 2024	(New Zealand) Michael Woud	Unattached	Auckland FC
30 May 2024	(New Zealand) Francis de Vries	(New Zealand) Eastern Suburbs	Auckland FC
30 May 2024	Daniel Margush	Western Sydney Wanderers	Unattached
30 May 2024	(Germany) Sonny Kittel	Western Sydney Wanderers	(Poland) Raków Częstochowa (end of loan)
30 May 2024	Daniel Bennie	Perth Glory	(England) Queens Park Rangers
31 May 2024	Brandon O'Neill	Newcastle Jets	Perth Glory
31 May 2024	Stefan Nigro	Melbourne Victory	Unattached
31 May 2024	Ahmad Taleb	Melbourne Victory	Unattached
31 May 2024	(Brazil) Ronald Barcellos	Central Coast Mariners	(Portugal) Portimonense (end of loan)
2 June 2024	Eli Adams	Melbourne Victory	Newcastle Jets
3 June 2024	Danijel Nizic	Macarthur FC	Unattached
3 June 2024	Daniel De Silva	Macarthur FC	Unattached
3 June 2024	Kearyn Baccus	Macarthur FC	Unattached
3 June 2024	Jesper Webber	Macarthur FC	Unattached
3 June 2024	(Tanzania) Charles M'Mombwa	Macarthur FC	Unattached
3 June 2024	Jerry Skotadis	Macarthur FC	Unattached
3 June 2024	Matthew Millar	Macarthur FC	Unattached
3 June 2024	Aziz Behich	(Saudi Arabia) Al Nassr	Melbourne City (end of loan)
3 June 2024	(New Zealand) Tommy Smith	Macarthur FC	Auckland FC
3 June 2024	(New Zealand) Max Mata	(England) Shrewsbury Town	Auckland FC (loan)
4 June 2024	Jake Girdwood-Reich	Sydney FC	(United States) St. Louis City
4 June 2024	Jing Reec	Central Coast Mariners	(Denmark) AGF (end of loan)
4 June 2024	Luke Brattan	Sydney FC	Macarthur FC
4 June 2024	(New Zealand) Alex Paulsen	Wellington Phoenix	(England) Bournemouth
5 June 2024	Lucas Mauragis	Newcastle Jets	Central Coast Mariners
5 June 2024	Ben Halloran	Adelaide United	Brisbane Roar
5 June 2024	(Costa Rica) Youstin Salas	Wellington Phoenix	(Costa Rica) Deportivo Saprissa (end of loan)
6 June 2024	Archie Goodwin	Newcastle Jets	Adelaide United
6 June 2024	Doni Grdić	Western Sydney Wanderers	Unattached
6 June 2024	(South Sudan) Valentino Yuel	Western Sydney Wanderers	Unattached
6 June 2024	Zach Lisolajski	Western United Youth	Perth Glory
7 June 2024	(United States) Marcus Ferkranus	(United States) LA Galaxy	Brisbane Roar
7 June 2024	(Portugal) Nuno Reis	Melbourne City	Unattached
10 June 2024	(Belgium) Anas Hamzaoui	Unattached	Perth Glory
12 June 2024	Nathanael Blair	Western Sydney Wanderers	Perth Glory
14 June 2024	Ruon Tongyik	Western Sydney Wanderers	Unattached
14 June 2024	Tate Russell	Western Sydney Wanderers	Western United
15 June 2024	(Croatia) Marin Jakoliš	(France) Angers	Macarthur FC
18 June 2024	Noah James	(Australia) Sydney Olympic	Newcastle Jets (end of loan)
19 June 2024	(France) Damien Da Silva	Melbourne Victory	Unattached
19 June 2024	Connor Chapman	Melbourne Victory	(South Korea) Gimpo
19 June 2024	Nicholas Pennington	Wellington Phoenix	Perth Glory
19 June 2024	Hosine Bility	(Portugal) Mafra	Brisbane Roar (loan)
20 June 2024	(New Zealand) Luis Toomey	(New Zealand) Eastern Suburbs	Auckland FC
20 June 2024	(New Zealand) Liam Gillion	(New Zealand) Auckland City	Auckland FC
20 June 2024	(New Zealand) Finn McKenlay	(New Zealand) Eastern Suburbs	Auckland FC
20 June 2024	(New Zealand) Adama Coulibaly	(New Zealand) Western Springs	Auckland FC
20 June 2024	(New Zealand) Oliver Middleton	(New Zealand) Auckland United	Auckland FC
20 June 2024	(New Zealand) Jonty Bidois	(New Zealand) Tauranga City	Auckland FC
20 June 2024	Adam Bugarija	Western Sydney Wanderers NPL	Perth Glory
20 June 2024	Abdelelah Faisal	Bulls FC Academy	Perth Glory
20 June 2024	Liam Rose	(United States) El Paso Locomotive	Macarthur FC
21 June 2024	Dylan Pierias	Western Sydney Wanderers	Adelaide United
21 June 2024	Jonas Markovski	Brisbane Roar	Unattached
21 June 2024	Carlo Armiento	Brisbane Roar	Unattached
21 June 2024	Shae Cahill	Brisbane Roar	Unattached
21 June 2024	James Nikolovski	Brisbane Roar	Unattached
21 June 2024	(South Sudan) Ayom Majok	Brisbane Roar	Unattached
21 June 2024	Taras Gomulka	Brisbane Roar	Perth Glory
22 June 2024	Chris Ikonomidis	Melbourne Victory	Macarthur FC
23 June 2024	Oscar Fryer	Sydney FC NPL	Newcastle Jets
24 June 2024	(Mexico) Ulises Dávila	Macarthur FC	Unattached
25 June 2024	(Lebanon) Walid Shour	(Lebanon) Al Ahed	Brisbane Roar
25 June 2024	Musa Toure	Adelaide United	(France) Clermont Foot
27 June 2024	Adam Zimarino	Perth Glory	Brisbane Roar
27 June 2024	Harrison Devenish-Meares	(Australia) Rockdale Ilinden	Sydney FC
28 June 2024	Lachlan Wales	Western United	(South Korea) Gyeongnam FC
28 June 2024	Joshua Rawlins	(Netherlands) Jong Utrecht	Melbourne Victory
29 June 2024	Maksim Kasalovic	Central Coast Mariners	(Australia) APIA Leichhardt
30 June 2024	(Netherlands) Bart Vriends	(Netherlands) Sparta Rotterdam	Adelaide United
1 July 2024	(Brazil) Marcelo	Western Sydney Wanderers	Unattached
1 July 2024	Henry Hore	Brisbane Roar	(South Korea) Gangwon FC (loan)
2 July 2024	(Fiji) Dan Hall	Central Coast Mariners	Auckland FC
2 July 2024	Adrian Segecic	(Netherlands) Dordrecht	Sydney FC (end of loan)
2 July 2024	Max Balard	Central Coast Mariners	(Netherlands) NAC Breda
2 July 2024	Matthew Scarcella	Sydney FC	Newcastle Jets (loan)
3 July 2024	(New Zealand) Joe Champness	Unattached	Auckland FC
3 July 2024	(New Zealand) Callan Elliot	Unattached	Auckland FC
3 July 2024	Scott Galloway	Melbourne City	Auckland FC
3 July 2024	Jing Reec	(Denmark) AGF	Melbourne Victory
5 July 2024	Reno Piscopo	Newcastle Jets	Melbourne Victory
5 July 2024	Lachlan Barr	Adelaide United	Perth Glory
8 July 2024	Jack Duncan	Wellington Phoenix	Melbourne Victory
9 July 2024	(New Zealand) Marco Rojas	Brisbane Roar	Wellington Phoenix
9 July 2024	Jake Brimmer	Melbourne Victory	Auckland FC
9 July 2024	Paul Izzo	Melbourne Victory	(Denmark) Randers
9 July 2024	(Germany) Tolgay Arslan	Melbourne City	Unattached
9 July 2024	(Morocco) Anas Ouahim	Unattached	Sydney FC
10 July 2024	(New Zealand) Ben Old	Wellington Phoenix	(France) Saint-Étienne
10 July 2024	(Netherlands) Jorrit Hendrix	Western Sydney Wanderers	Unattached
10 July 2024	Brendan Hamill	(India) Mohun Bagan	Melbourne Victory
12 July 2024	(Brazil) Daniel Penha	Western United	(Brazil) Atlético Mineiro (end of loan)
12 July 2024	(Northern Ireland) Alfie McCalmont	(England) Carlisle United	Central Coast Mariners
16 July 2024	(Bulgaria) Bozhidar Kraev	Wellington Phoenix	Western Sydney Wanderers
17 July 2024	(Japan) Hiroaki Aoyama	(Australia) Marconi Stallions	Perth Glory
17 July 2024	Adam Pavlesic	Sydney FC	Central Coast Mariners
17 July 2024	(Argentina) Germán Ferreyra	Unattached	Melbourne City
17 July 2024	Nikola Mileusnic	Brisbane Roar	Perth Glory
18 July 2024	Diesel Herrington	(Denmark) AGF	Central Coast Mariners
20 July 2024	(New Zealand) Finn Surman	Wellington Phoenix	(United States) Portland Timbers
21 July 2024	Lachlan Rose	Macarthur FC	Newcastle Jets
21 July 2024	Apostolos Stamatelopoulos	Newcastle Jets	(Scotland) Motherwell
23 July 2024	Lachlan Brook	Western Sydney Wanderers	(United States) Real Salt Lake
25 July 2024	(Japan) Hiroki Sakai	(Japan) Urawa Red Diamonds	Auckland FC
26 July 2024	Paulo Retre	(India) Goa	Wellington Phoenix
26 July 2024	Jacob Farrell	Central Coast Mariners	(England) Portsmouth
29 July 2024	(New Zealand) Logan Rogerson	(Armenia) Noah	Auckland FC
29 July 2024	(New Zealand) Joseph Knowles	(New Zealand) Eastern Suburbs	Auckland FC
29 July 2024	Joshua Damevski	Melbourne City NPL	Macarthur FC
1 August 2024	(Brazil) Vitor Feijão	Unattached	Central Coast Mariners
2 August 2024	Besian Kutleshi	Melbourne City NPL	Western United
3 August 2024	(South Korea) Jeong Tae-wook	(South Korea) Jeonbuk Hyundai Motors	Western Sydney Wanderers (loan)
6 August 2024	(Netherlands) Julian Kwaaitaal	(Netherlands) PSV	Adelaide United
6 August 2024	(Netherlands) Julian Kwaaitaal	Adelaide United	(Netherlands) FC Eindhoven (loan)
7 August 2024	(North Macedonia) Matthew Bozinovski	Melbourne Victory	Unattached
8 August 2024	(Greece) Nikos Vergos	(Greece) Atromitos	Melbourne Victory
9 August 2024	(New Zealand) Alex Paulsen	(England) Bournemouth	Auckland FC (loan)
13 August 2024	(New Zealand) Luke Brooke-Smith	(New Zealand) Hamilton Wanderers	Wellington Phoenix
13 August 2024	(Curaçao) Roly Bonevacia	Melbourne Victory	Unattached
15 August 2024	(Nigeria) Josh Oluwayemi	(Finland) Lahti	Wellington Phoenix
16 August 2024	(Brazil) Léo Sena	(Brazil) Água Santa	Sydney FC
22 August 2024	(Austria) Andreas Kuen	Unattached	Melbourne City
22 August 2024	Josh Nisbet	Central Coast Mariners	(Scotland) Ross County
23 August 2024	Jordan Holmes	(Australia) Rochedale Rovers	Western Sydney Wanderers
23 August 2024	Trent Sainsbury	Unattached	Central Coast Mariners
23 August 2024	Giordano Colli	Perth Glory	Unattached
26 August 2024	(Brazil) Douglas Costa	Unattached	Sydney FC
28 August 2024	Daniel De Silva	Unattached	Macarthur FC
28 August 2024	Dylan Wenzel-Halls	Central Coast Mariners	(Malaysia) Penang
29 August 2024	(Japan) Kazuki Nagasawa	(Japan) Vegalta Sendai	Wellington Phoenix
2 September 2024	(Japan) Hideki Ishige	(Japan) Gamba Osaka	Wellington Phoenix
3 September 2024	(New Zealand) Nando Pijnaker	(Republic of Ireland) Sligo Rovers	Auckland FC
4 September 2024	Marcus Younis	Western Sydney Wanderers	(Netherlands) Jong PSV (loan)
5 September 2024	(Spain) Juan Mata	Unattached	Western Sydney Wanderers
9 September 2024	(Poland) Patryk Klimala	(Poland) Śląsk Wrocław	Sydney FC (loan)
9 September 2024	Ben Gibson	(Australia) APIA Leichhardt	Newcastle Jets
10 September 2024	(Ecuador) Luis Cangá	Unattached	Perth Glory
10 September 2024	Dean Pelekanos	(Australia) Rockdale Ilinden	Western Sydney Wanderers
11 September 2024	James Temelkovski	(Australia) Marconi Stallions	Western Sydney Wanderers
12 September 2024	Sabit Ngor	(Australia) Heidelberg United	Central Coast Mariners
13 September 2024	(Colombia) Cristian Caicedo	(Colombia) Orsomarso	Perth Glory
15 September 2024	Max Vartuli	Sydney FC Youth	Adelaide United
15 September 2024	Harry Sawyer	(Australia) South Melbourne	Macarthur FC
16 September 2024	(Brazil) Wellissol	Unattached	Newcastle Jets
16 September 2024	(Belgium) Dino Arslanagić	Unattached	Macarthur FC
16 September 2024	(New Zealand) Corban Piper	(New Zealand) Birkenhead United	Wellington Phoenix
16 September 2024	(Indonesia) Rafael Struick	(Netherlands) ADO Den Haag	Brisbane Roar
16 September 2024	Nathaniel Atkinson	(Scotland) Heart of Midlothian	Melbourne City
16 September 2024	(Israel) Yonatan Cohen	Unattached	Melbourne City
17 September 2024	(Chile) Felipe Gallegos	(Greece) OFI Crete	Auckland FC
17 September 2024	(Uruguay) Guillermo May	(Argentina) Newell's Old Boys	Auckland FC
17 September 2024	(Belgium) Louis Verstraete	(Belgium) Beveren	Auckland FC
17 September 2024	Ben Folami	Melbourne Victory	Adelaide United
17 September 2024	Rylan Brownlie	Brisbane Roar	(England) Crystal Palace
17 September 2024	Ryan Lethlean	Brisbane Roar	(Australia) Heidelberg United
17 September 2024	Jez Lofthouse	Brisbane Roar	Unattached
17 September 2024	(Ecuador) Néicer Acosta	(Ecuador) Guayaquil City	Brisbane Roar
18 September 2024	Alexandar Popovic	(South Korea) Gwangju	Sydney FC (loan)
19 September 2024	Jacob Brazete	Sydney FC Youth	Brisbane Roar
19 September 2024	Pearson Kasawaya	Sydney FC Youth	Brisbane Roar
19 September 2024	Jordan Elsey	Unattached	Adelaide United
19 September 2024	(New Zealand) Clayton Lewis	Macarthur FC	Unattached
25 September 2024	Ben Holliday	(Australia) Moreton City Excelsior	Western Sydney Wanderers
10 October 2024	(North Macedonia) Stefan Colakovski	Perth Glory	Wellington Phoenix
10 October 2024	(Brazil) Santos	(Cyprus) AEK Larnaca	Melbourne Victory
14 October 2024	(Colombia) Neyder Moreno	(Colombia) Atlético Nacional	Auckland FC

=== Mid-season ===
Date	Name	Moving from	Moving to
28 November 2024	Jacob Muir	Perth Glory	(United States) Monterey Bay
5 December 2024	Tom Beadling	Western Sydney Wanderers	Unattached
6 December 2024	Tomislav Mrčela	Unattached	Perth Glory
18 December 2024	(Ecuador) Luis Cangá	Perth Glory	Unattached
23 December 2024	(New Zealand) Joe Champness	Auckland FC	Unattached
23 December 2024	(Colombia) Cristian Caicedo	Perth Glory	Unattached
28 December 2024	Mustafa Amini	Perth Glory	Unattached
2 January 2025	Luke Bodnar	Perth Glory	(United Arab Emirates) Al-Ittifaq
2 January 2025	Joe Caletti	Brisbane Roar	(Japan) Tochigi City
2 January 2025	Logan Sambrook	(Australia) North Coast Football	Central Coast Mariners
2 January 2025	Henrique Oliveira	(Australia) FFSA NTC	Macarthur FC
5 January 2025	Mitchell Glasson	Sydney FC	(Finland) KTP (loan)
6 January 2025	Harry Van Der Saag	Brisbane Roar	Unattached
9 January 2025	Marlee Francois	Unattached	Auckland FC
10 January 2025	Jason Geria	Melbourne Victory	(Japan) Albirex Niigata
11 January 2025	(New Zealand) Oskar van Hattum	Wellington Phoenix	(Republic of Ireland) Sligo Rovers
13 January 2025	(England) David Ball	Wellington Phoenix	Unattached
15 January 2025	Alex Gersbach	(Sweden) Kalmar FF	Western Sydney Wanderers
16 January 2025	Mitchell Langerak	(Japan) Nagoya Grampus	Melbourne Victory
16 January 2025	Henry Hore	(South Korea) Gangwon FC	Brisbane Roar (end of loan)
16 January 2025	Lachlan Wales	Unattached	Perth Glory
16 January 2025	Jarrod Carluccio	Perth Glory	Western Sydney Wanderers
16 January 2025	(Japan) Yuto Misao	(Japan) Kyoto Sanga	Perth Glory
16 January 2025	(Japan) Takuya Okamoto	(Japan) Shonan Bellmare	Perth Glory
17 January 2025	Patrick Wood	Sydney FC	Perth Glory (loan)
17 January 2025	Jaushua Sotirio	Unattached	Sydney FC
18 January 2025	Tom Heward-Belle	Western United	(Japan) Montedio Yamagata
21 January 2025	Abdelelah Faisal	Perth Glory	Central Coast Mariners
21 January 2025	Ben Holliday	Western Sydney Wanderers	Unattached
21 January 2025	(Japan) Kota Mizunuma	(Japan) Yokohama F. Marinos	Newcastle Jets
22 January 2025	(Belgium) Dino Arslanagić	Macarthur FC	(Turkey) Manisa
22 January 2025	Thomas Waddingham	Brisbane Roar	(England) Portsmouth
23 January 2025	Nathan Amanatidis	Sydney FC	Brisbane Roar
23 January 2025	(Tanzania) Charles M'Mombwa	Unattached	Newcastle Jets
23 January 2025	Ariath Piol	Macarthur FC	(United States) Real Salt Lake
23 January 2025	(Iraq) Mohamed Al-Taay	Wellington Phoenix	Western Sydney Wanderers
24 January 2025	Tass Mourdoukoutas	Unattached	Perth Glory
27 January 2025	Hayden Matthews	Sydney FC	(England) Portsmouth
28 January 2025	Oliver Jones	Macarthur FC	(Denmark) Randers
29 January 2025	Lachlan Jackson	Unattached	Melbourne Victory
29 January 2025	Peter Makrillos	Unattached	Macarthur FC
30 January 2025	Jed Drew	Macarthur FC	(Austria) TSV Hartberg
31 January 2025	Scott Neville	Brisbane Roar	Retired
31 January 2025	Nathan Grimaldi	Newcastle Jets	(Australia) St George City
31 January 2025	Zac Bowling	Newcastle Jets	(Australia) Blacktown City (loan)
1 February 2025	Alex Grant	Unattached	Sydney FC
2 February 2025	Alex Parsons	Brisbane Roar	(Northern Ireland) Cliftonville
3 February 2025	(Ecuador) Néicer Acosta	Brisbane Roar	Unattached
3 February 2025	(Tunisia) Saîf-Eddine Khaoui	Unattached	Macarthur FC
3 February 2025	Austin Ludwik	(Australia) Gold Coast Knights	Brisbane Roar
4 February 2025	Alexandar Popovic	Sydney FC	(South Korea) Gwangju (end of loan)
4 February 2025	Alexandar Popovic	(South Korea) Gwangju	Sydney FC
4 February 2025	(Ivory Coast) Kévin Boli	Unattached	Macarthur FC
5 February 2025	Sabit Ngor	Central Coast Mariners	(Australia) Heidelberg United (loan)
6 February 2025	(England) Jamie Young	Melbourne City	Retired
10 February 2025	Joshua Laws	Unattached	Western Sydney Wanderers
12 February 2025	(Portugal) Francisco Geraldes	(Malaysia) Johor Darul Ta'zim	Wellington Phoenix (loan)
12 February 2025	(Portugal) Asumah Abubakar	(Switzerland) Grasshopper	Brisbane Roar
13 February 2025	Alexander Badolato	Western Sydney Wanderers	Melbourne Victory (loan)
14 February 2025	(England) Luke Amos	Unattached	Perth Glory
17 February 2025	(France) Valère Germain	Macarthur FC	(Japan) Sanfrecce Hiroshima
31 March 2025	(New Zealand) Marco Rojas	Wellington Phoenix	Unattached
9 April 2025	(South Sudan) Joel Anasmo	Perth Glory	(South Korea) Jeonbuk Hyundai Motors (loan)
17 April 2025	Dakota Ochsenham	(Australia) Beograd	Melbourne City

Player was released to free agency before joining new club
