= 2025 A-League Men finals series =

A-League Men finals series
- Season: 2024–25
- Dates: 9–31 May 2025
- Champions: Melbourne City
- Runner up: Melbourne Victory
- Matches: 7
- Goals: 17 (2.43 per match)
- Top goalscorer: Noah Botic (3 goals)
- Biggest home win: Western United 3–2 Adelaide United (Elimination Final, 9 May 2025); Melbourne City 1–0 Melbourne Victory (Grand Final, 31 May 2025)
- Biggest away win: Western United 0–3 Melbourne City (Semi finals, 16 May 2025)
- Highest scoring: Western United 3–2 Adelaide United (Elimination-finals, 9 May 2025)
- Highest attendance: 29,902; Melbourne City 1–0 Melbourne Victory (Grand Final, 31 May 2025)
- Lowest attendance: 3,078; Western United 3–2 Adelaide United (Elimination-finals, 9 May 2025)
- Total attendance: 105,525
- Average attendance: 15,075

The 2025 A-League Men finals series was the 20th annual edition of A-League finals series, the playoffs tournament staged to determine the champions of the 2024–25 A-League Men season. The series was played over four weeks culminating in the 2025 A-League Men Grand Final.

== Qualification ==
Auckland FC qualified first for the Finals series, doing so in Round 25. Melbourne City qualified a round later, in Round 26. Western United qualified next following a draw between Brisbane Roar and Adelaide United in a postponed match played between Round 27 and Round 28. Melbourne Victory and Western Sydney Wanderers both qualified in Round 28, and Adelaide United qualified in Round 29.

Pos	Team	Pld	W	D	L	GF	GA	GD	Pts	Qualification
1	Auckland FC (Note: Auckland FC and Wellington Phoenix cannot qualify for Asian Football Confederation competitions as they are based in New Zealand, which is part of the Oceania Football Confederation.)	26	15	8	3	49	27	+22	53	Qualification for Finals series (Note: The top two teams enter the finals series at the semi-finals, while the teams ranked third to sixth enter the finals series at the elimination-finals.)
2	Melbourne City (C)	26	14	6	6	41	25	+16	48	Qualification for AFC Champions League Elite and Finals series
3	Western United	26	14	5	7	55	37	+18	47	Qualification for Finals series
4	Western Sydney Wanderers	26	13	7	6	58	40	+18	46	Qualification for Finals series
5	Melbourne Victory	26	12	7	7	44	36	+8	43	Qualification for Finals series
6	Adelaide United	26	10	8	8	53	55	−2	38	Qualification for Finals series
7	Sydney FC	26	10	7	9	53	46	+7	37	
8	Macarthur FC	26	9	6	11	50	45	+5	33	Qualification for AFC Champions League Two (Note: Qualified for AFC Champions League Two as the 2024 Australia Cup winners.)
9	Newcastle Jets	26	8	6	12	43	44	−1	30	
10	Central Coast Mariners	26	5	11	10	29	51	−22	26	Qualification for 2025 Australia Cup play-offs
11	Wellington Phoenix	26	6	6	14	27	43	−16	24	Qualification for 2025 Australia Cup play-offs
12	Brisbane Roar	26	5	6	15	32	51	−19	21	Qualification for 2025 Australia Cup play-offs
13	Perth Glory	26	4	5	17	22	56	−34	17	Qualification for 2025 Australia Cup play-offs

Source: A-Leagues
Rules for classification: 1) points; 2) goal difference; 3) goals scored; 4) wins; 5) head-to-head results; 5a) head-to-head points; 5b) head-to-head goal difference; 6) Fair Play points; 7) away goal difference; 8) away goals per match; 9) home goal difference; 10) home goals per match; 11) toss of a coin in an event of a tie of two clubs.
(C) Champions

== Venues ==
Auckland FC and Melbourne City are both guaranteed a top two finish, and have each secured a home semi-final. Western Sydney Wanderers and Western United both hosted an elimination-final. AAMI Park was chosen to host the Grand Final as Melbourne City were hosts against Melbourne Victory.

Melbourne	Australia: New Zealand:	Auckland
AAMI Park	Australia: New Zealand:	Go Media Stadium
Capacity: 30,050	Australia: New Zealand:	Capacity: 25,000
Melbourne	Australia: New Zealand:	Sydney
Ironbark Fields	Australia: New Zealand:	CommBank Stadium
Capacity: 5,000	Australia: New Zealand:	Capacity: 30,000

== Bracket ==
The system used for the 2025 A-League Men finals series is the modified top-six play-offs by the A-Leagues. The top two teams entered the two-legged semi-finals receiving the bye for the elimination-finals in which the teams from third placed to sixth place enter the elimination-finals with "third against sixth" and "fourth against fifth". Losers for the elimination-finals were eliminated, and winners qualified for the two-legged semi-finals.

First placed team in the semi-finals played the lowest ranked elimination-final winning team and second placed team in the semi-finals played the highest ranked elimination-final winner. Home-state advantage went to the team with the higher ladder position.

Elimination finals
4	Western Sydney Wanderers	1
5	Melbourne Victory	2
3	Western United	3
6	Adelaide United	2

Semi-finals
1	Auckland FC	1	0	1
5	Melbourne Victory	0	2	2
2	Melbourne City	3	1	4
3	Western United	0	1	1

Grand Final
2	Melbourne City	1
5	Melbourne Victory	0

== Elimination finals ==
=== First elimination final: Western United vs Adelaide United ===
9 May 2025
19:35 AEST (UTC+10:00)

Western United	3–2	Adelaide United
Botic 20', 31', 62'	Report	Jovanovic 3'; Mauk 79'

Ironbark Fields, Melbourne
Attendance: 3,078
Referee: Alex King

Western United	Adelaide United

GK	33	(Australia) Matt Sutton
RB	6	(Japan) Tomoki Imai
CB	4	(Australia) James Donachie (substituted off) 14'
CB	30	(Australia) Dylan Leonard (yellow card) 34'
LB	17	(Australia) Ben Garuccio
RM	10	(Australia) Matthew Grimaldi (substituted off) 66'
CM	23	(Australia) Rhys Bozinovski
CM	32	(Australia) Angus Thurgate
LM	77	(Japan) Riku Danzaki (yellow card) 73' (substituted off) 77'
RF	19	(Australia) Noah Botic (substituted off) 77'
LF	24	(Australia) Michael Ruhs (substituted off) 66'
Substitutes
GK	70	(Australia) Michael Vonja
DF	13	(Australia) Tate Russell (substituted on) 14'
MF	44	(Australia) Jordan Lauton
MF	20	(Australia) Abel Walatee (substituted on) 66'
MF	7	(Australia) Ramy Najjarine (substituted on) 77' (yellow card) 90+3'
FW	5	(Australia) Oliver Lavale (substituted on) 66'
FW	9	(Japan) Hiroshi Ibusuki (substituted on) 77' (yellow card) 89'
Manager
(Australia) John Aloisi

GK	13	(Australia) Max Vartuli
RB	20	(Australia) Dylan Pierias
CB	3	(Netherlands) Bart Vriends (c) (substituted off) 70'
CB	51	(Australia) Panagiotis Kikianis (yellow card) 86'
LB	21	(Spain) Javi López (substituted off) 70'
DM	8	(Spain) Isaías
DM	55	(Australia) Ethan Alagich (substituted off) 80'
RW	10	(England) Zach Clough (substituted off) 80'
AM	6	(Australia) Stefan Mauk (yellow card) 63'
LW	7	(Australia) Ryan Kitto
ST	9	(Australia) Luka Jovanovic (substituted off) 88'
Substitutes
GK	1	(Australia) James Delianov
DF	4	(Australia) Jordan Elsey (substituted on) 88'
MF	12	(Australia) Jonny Yull (substituted on) 80'
MF	14	(Australia) Jay Barnett (substituted on) 70'
FW	17	(Australia) Ben Folami
FW	19	(Australia) Yaya Dukuly (substituted on) 70'
FW	58	(Australia) Harry Crawford (substituted on) 80'
Manager
(Australia) Carl Veart

Man of the Match:
Noah Botic (Western United)

Assistant referees:
George Lakrindis
Emma Kocbek
Fourth official:
Daniel Elder
Video assistant referee:
Shaun Evans
Assistant video assistant referees:
Brad Wright

Match rules

- 90 minutes.
- 30 minutes of extra time if necessary.
- Penalty shoot-out if scores still level.
- Seven named substitutes.
- Maximum of five substitutions, with a sixth allowed in extra time. (Note: Each team was given only three opportunities to make substitutions, with a fourth opportunity in extra time, excluding substitutions made at half-time, before the start of extra time and at half-time in extra time.)

=== Second elimination final: Western Sydney Wanderers vs Melbourne Victory ===
10 May 2025
19:35 AEST (UTC+10:00)

Western Sydney Wanderers	1–2	Melbourne Victory
Sapsford 23'	Report	Bos 7'; Machach 42'

CommBank Stadium, Sydney
Attendance: 16,399
Referee: Adam Kersey

Western Sydney Wanderers	Melbourne Victory

GK	20	(Australia) Lawrence Thomas
RB	2	(Australia) Gabriel Cleur (substituted off) 73'
CB	22	(Australia) Anthony Pantazopoulos
CB	4	(Australia) Alex Bonetig
LB	3	(Australia) Alex Gersbach
RM	14	(Australia) Nicolas Milanovic (substituted off) 89'
CM	25	(Australia) Joshua Brillante (substituted off) 73'
CM	18	(Australia) Oscar Priestman
LM	23	(Bulgaria) Bozhidar Kraev
RF	26	(Australia) Brandon Borrello
LF	7	(Australia) Zac Sapsford (substituted off) 73'
Substitutes
GK	30	(Australia) Jordan Holmes
DF	28	(Australia) Joshua Laws
MF	6	(Iraq) Mohamed Al-Taay
MF	64	(Spain) Juan Mata (substituted on) 73'
FW	9	(Sweden) Marcus Antonsson (substituted on) 73'
FW	17	(Australia) Jarrod Carluccio (substituted on) 73'
FW	21	(Australia) Aydan Hammond (substituted on) 89'
Manager
(Australia) Alen Stajcic

GK	25	(Australia) Jack Duncan
RB	16	(Australia) Joshua Inserra (yellow card) 4' (substituted off) 78'
CB	21	(Portugal) Roderick Miranda (c)
CB	4	(Australia) Lachlan Jackson
LB	28	(Australia) Kasey Bos
DM	6	(Australia) Ryan Teague
DM	14	(Australia) Jordi Valadon
CM	8	(France) Zinédine Machach (substituted off) 87'
RW	7	(Australia) Daniel Arzani (yellow card) 82' (substituted off) 84'
LW	17	(Australia) Nishan Velupillay (substituted off) 87'
ST	9	(Greece) Nikos Vergos (substituted off) 88'
Substitutes
GK	30	(Australia) Daniel Graskoski
DF	5	(Australia) Brendan Hamill (substituted on) 87'
DF	22	(Australia) Joshua Rawlins (substituted on) 78'
MF	18	(Australia) Fabian Monge
FW	10	(Australia) Bruno Fornaroli (substituted on) 88'
FW	11	(Brazil) Santos (substituted on) 84'
FW	19	(Australia) Jing Reec (substituted on) 87'
Manager
(Australia) Arthur Diles

Man of the Match:
Daniel Arzani (Melbourne Victory)

Assistant referees:
Kearney Robinson
Hugh Fenton-White
Fourth official:
Ben Abraham
Video assistant referee:
Lara Lee
Assistant video assistant referees:
Casey Reibelt

Match rules

- 90 minutes.
- 30 minutes of extra time if necessary.
- Penalty shoot-out if scores still level.
- Seven named substitutes.
- Maximum of five substitutions, with a sixth allowed in extra time.

== Semi-finals ==
=== Summary ===
Team 1	Agg.	Team 2	1st leg	2nd leg
Auckland FC	1–2	Melbourne Victory	1–0	0–2
Melbourne City	4–1	Western United	3–0	1–1

=== Matches ===
==== First semi-final: Auckland FC vs Melbourne Victory ====
===== First leg =====
17 May 2025
19:35 AEST (UTC+10:00)

Melbourne Victory	0–1	Auckland FC
	Report	Rogerson 64'

AAMI Park, Melbourne
Attendance: 14,121
Referee: Ben Abraham

Melbourne Victory	Auckland FC

GK	25	(Australia) Jack Duncan
RB	16	(Australia) Joshua Inserra
CB	5	(Australia) Brendan Hamill (c) (substituted off) 58'
CB	4	(Australia) Lachlan Jackson (yellow card) 85'
LB	28	(Australia) Kasey Bos
DM	6	(Australia) Ryan Teague
DM	14	(Australia) Jordi Valadon
CM	8	(France) Zinédine Machach (substituted off) 84'
RW	7	(Australia) Daniel Arzani (substituted off) 70'
LW	17	(Australia) Nishan Velupillay (substituted off) 84'
ST	9	(Greece) Nikos Vergos (substituted off) 69'
Substitutes
GK	40	(Australia) Christian Siciliano
DF	38	(Australia) Luke Didulica
DF	22	(Australia) Joshua Rawlins (substituted on) 58'
MF	27	(Australia) Reno Piscopo (substituted on) 84'
MF	23	(Australia) Alexander Badolato (substituted on) 84'
FW	11	(Brazil) Santos (substituted on) 70'
FW	10	(Australia) Bruno Fornaroli (substituted on) 69'
Manager
(Australia) Arthur Diles

GK	12	(New Zealand) Alex Paulsen
RB	2	(Japan) Hiroki Sakai (c)
CB	23	(Australia) Dan Hall
CB	4	(New Zealand) Nando Pijnaker
LB	15	(New Zealand) Francis De Vries (substituted off) 80'
DM	6	(Belgium) Louis Verstraete
DM	28	(Chile) Felipe Gallegos (substituted off) 80'
CM	27	(New Zealand) Logan Rogerson (substituted off) 75'
CM	11	(Australia) Marlee Francois (yellow card) 60' (substituted off) 63'
RF	10	(Uruguay) Guillermo May
LF	21	(New Zealand) Jesse Randall (substituted off) 63'
Substitutes
GK	1	(New Zealand) Michael Woud
DF	5	(New Zealand) Tommy Smith (substituted on) 75'
DF	17	(New Zealand) Callan Elliot (substituted on) 80'
MF	7	(New Zealand) Cameron Howieson
MF	22	(Australia) Jake Brimmer (substituted on) 75'
MF	25	(Colombia) Neyder Moreno (substituted on) 63'
FW	14	(New Zealand) Liam Gillion (substituted on) 63'
Manager
(Australia) Steve Corica

Man of the Match:
Francis de Vries (Auckland FC)

Assistant referees:
Andrew Meimarakis
Astro Sakalis
Fourth official:
Daniel Elder
Video assistant referee:
Alex King
Assistant video assistant referees:
Casey Reibelt

Match rules

- 90 minutes.
- Seven named substitutes.
- Maximum of five substitutions. (Note: Each team was given only three opportunities to make substitutions, excluding substitutions made at half-time.)

===== Second leg =====
24 May 2025
18:00 NZST (UTC+12:00)

Auckland FC	0–2	Melbourne Victory
	Report	Machach 55'; Fornaroli 60'

Go Media Stadium, Auckland
Attendance: 29,148
Referee: Alex King

Auckland FC	Melbourne Victory

GK	12	(New Zealand) Alex Paulsen (yellow card) 44'
RB	2	(Japan) Hiroki Sakai (c) (substituted off) 74'
CB	23	(Australia) Dan Hall
CB	4	(New Zealand) Nando Pijnaker (yellow card) 78'
LB	15	(New Zealand) Francis De Vries
DM	6	(Belgium) Louis Verstraete
DM	28	(Chile) Felipe Gallegos (yellow card) 41' (substituted off) 58'
CM	27	(New Zealand) Logan Rogerson (substituted off) 74'
CM	11	(Australia) Marlee Francois (substituted off) 58'
RF	10	(Uruguay) Guillermo May
LF	21	(New Zealand) Jesse Randall (substituted off) 62'
Substitutes
GK	1	(New Zealand) Michael Woud
DF	5	(New Zealand) Tommy Smith
DF	14	(New Zealand) Callan Elliot (substituted on) 74'
MF	7	(New Zealand) Cameron Howieson (substituted on) 74'
MF	22	(Australia) Jake Brimmer (substituted on) 58'
MF	25	(Colombia) Neyder Moreno (substituted on) 58'
FW	14	(New Zealand) Liam Gillion (substituted on) 62'
Manager
(Australia) Steve Corica

GK	25	(Australia) Jack Duncan
RB	22	(Australia) Joshua Rawlins
CB	21	(Portugal) Roderick Miranda
CB	4	(Australia) Lachlan Jackson
LB	11	(Brazil) Santos (substituted off) 66'
DM	6	(Australia) Ryan Teague
DM	14	(Australia) Jordi Valadon (yellow card) 46'
CM	8	(France) Zinédine Machach (substituted off) 90+4'
RW	17	(Australia) Nishan Velupillay (substituted off) 45'
LW	7	(Australia) Daniel Arzani (yellow card) 20' (substituted off) 83'
ST	10	(Australia) Bruno Fornaroli (substituted off) 83'
Substitutes
GK	40	(Australia) Christian Siciliano
DF	16	(Australia) Joshua Inserra (substituted on) 45'
DF	38	(Australia) Luke Didulica
MF	27	(Australia) Reno Piscopo (substituted on) 83'
MF	23	(Australia) Alexander Badolato (substituted on) 90+4'
FW	11	(Australia) Jing Reec (substituted on) 66'
FW	9	(Greece) Nikos Vergos (substituted on) 83'
Manager
(Australia) Arthur Diles

Man of the Match:
Jordi Valadon (Melbourne Victory)

Assistant referees:
Kearney Robinson
Hugh Fenton-White
Fourth official:
Daniel Elder
Video assistant referee:
Shaun Evans
Assistant video assistant referees:
Brad Wright

Match rules

- 90 minutes.
- 30 minutes of extra time if necessary.
- Penalty shoot-out if aggregate scores still level.
- Seven named substitutes.
- Maximum of five substitutions, with a sixth allowed in extra time.

==== Second semi-final: Melbourne City vs Western United ====
===== First leg =====
16 May 2025
19:35 AEST (UTC+10:00)

Western United	0–3	Melbourne City
	Report	Ferreyra 16'; Cohen 54'; Leckie 72'

AAMI Park, Melbourne
Attendance: 5,186
Referee: Shaun Evans

Western United	Melbourne City

GK	33	(Australia) Matt Sutton
RB	13	(Australia) Tate Russell
CB	6	(Japan) Tomoki Imai
CB	30	(Australia) Dylan Leonard
LB	17	(Australia) Ben Garuccio (c)
RM	10	(Australia) Matthew Grimaldi (substituted off) 65'
CM	23	(Australia) Rhys Bozinovski (yellow card) 34'
CM	32	(Australia) Angus Thurgate (yellow card) 34'
LM	77	(Japan) Riku Danzaki (substituted off) 72'
RF	9	(Japan) Hiroshi Ibusuki (substituted off) 65'
LF	24	(Australia) Michael Ruhs (yellow card) 12' (substituted off) 71'
Substitutes
GK	70	(Australia) Michael Vonja
DF	22	(Australia) Kane Vidmar
MF	44	(Australia) Jordan Lauton
MF	20	(Australia) Abel Walatee (substituted on) 65'
MF	7	(Australia) Ramy Najjarine (substituted on) 72'
FW	5	(Australia) Oliver Lavale (substituted on) 65'
FW	19	(Australia) Noah Botic (substituted on) 71'
Manager
(Australia) John Aloisi

GK	33	(Australia) Patrick Beach
RB	2	(Australia) Callum Talbot (substituted off) 74'
CB	27	(Australia) Kai Trewin
CB	22	(Argentina) Germán Ferreyra (yellow card) 82'
LB	16	(Australia) Aziz Behich (c)
DM	19	(Australia) Zane Schreiber (yellow card) 58' (substituted off) 84'
CM	30	(Austria) Andreas Kuen (substituted off) 67'
CM	21	(Australia) Alessandro Lopane (substituted off) 59'
RW	10	(Israel) Yonatan Cohen (substituted off) 83'
LW	23	(Australia) Marco Tilio
ST	17	(Australia) Max Caputo (substituted off) 67'
Substitutes
GK	18	(Australia) Dakota Ochsenham
DF	36	(Australia) Harry Shillington
MF	6	(Australia) Steven Ugarkovic (substituted on) 67' (yellow card) 89'
MF	41	(Australia) Lawrence Wong (substituted on) 84'
MF	47	(Australia) Kavian Rahmani (substituted on) 83'
FW	7	(Australia) Matthew Leckie (substituted on) 59'
FW	35	(Australia) Medin Memeti (substituted on) 67'
Manager
(Australia) Aurelio Vidmar

Man of the Match:
Yonatan Cohen (Melbourne City)

Assistant referees:
Arvin Shanmuganathan
Brad Wright
Fourth official:
Adam Kersey
Video assistant referee:
Lara Lee
Assistant video assistant referee:
Kearney Robinson

Match rules

- 90 minutes.
- Seven named substitutes.
- Maximum of five substitutions.

===== Second leg =====
24 May 2025
19:35 AEST (UTC+10:00)

Melbourne City	1–1	Western United
Behich 20'	Report	Botic 66'

AAMI Park, Melbourne
Attendance: 7,691
Referee: Adam Kersey

Melbourne City	Western United

GK	33	(Australia) Patrick Beach
RB	13	(Australia) Nathaniel Atkinson (substituted off) 60'
CB	27	(Australia) Kai Trewin
CB	22	(Argentina) Germán Ferreyra
LB	16	(Australia) Aziz Behich (c) (yellow card) 72'
DM	6	(Australia) Steven Ugarkovic (substituted off) 71'
CM	30	(Austria) Andreas Kuen
CM	21	(Australia) Alessandro Lopane (substituted off) 45'
RW	10	(Israel) Yonatan Cohen (substituted off) 83'
LW	23	(Australia) Marco Tilio (substituted off) 71'
ST	17	(Australia) Max Caputo
Substitutes
GK	18	(Australia) Dakota Ochsenham
DF	2	(Australia) Callum Talbot (substituted on) 60'
MF	19	(Australia) Zane Schreiber (substituted on) 71'
MF	39	(Australia) Emin Durakovic
MF	47	(Australia) Kavian Rahmani (substituted on) 83'
FW	7	(Australia) Matthew Leckie (substituted on) 46' (yellow card) 8u'
FW	35	(Australia) Medin Memeti (substituted on) 71'
Manager
(Australia) Aurelio Vidmar

GK	33	(Australia) Matt Sutton
RB	6	(Japan) Tomoki Imai (substituted off) 46'
CB	4	(Australia) James Donachie
CB	30	(Australia) Dylan Leonard
LB	17	(Australia) Ben Garuccio (c) (yellow card) 12'
RM	77	(Japan) Riku Danzaki (substituted off) 78'
CM	23	(Australia) Rhys Bozinovski (substituted off) 82'
CM	32	(Australia) Angus Thurgate
LW	20	(Australia) Abel Walatee (substituted off) 60'
RF	19	(Australia) Noah Botic
LF	24	(Australia) Michael Ruhs (substituted off) 46'
Substitutes
GK	70	(Australia) Michael Vonja
DF	13	(Australia) Tate Russell (substituted on) 46'
MF	44	(Australia) Jordan Lauton (substituted on) 82'
MF	10	(Australia) Matthew Grimaldi (substituted on) 60'
MF	7	(Australia) Ramy Najjarine (substituted on) 78'
FW	5	(Australia) Oliver Lavale
FW	9	(Japan) Hiroshi Ibusuki (substituted on) 46'
Manager
(Australia) John Aloisi

Man of the Match:
Patrick Beach (Melbourne City)

Assistant referees:
George Lakrindis
Emma Kocbek
Fourth official:
Ben Abraham
Video assistant referee:
Lara Lee
Assistant video assistant referees:
Casey Reibelt

Match rules

- 90 minutes.
- 30 minutes of extra time if necessary.
- Penalty shoot-out if aggregate scores still level.
- Seven named substitutes.
- Maximum of five substitutions, with a sixth allowed in extra time.

== Grand Final ==
31 May 2025
19:40 AEST (UTC+10:00)

Melbourne City	1–0	Melbourne Victory
Cohen 10'	Report

AAMI Park, Melbourne
Attendance: 29,902
Referee: Adam Kersey (Queensland)

Melbourne City	Melbourne Victory

GK	33	(Australia) Patrick Beach
RB	13	(Australia) Nathaniel Atkinson
CB	22	(Argentina) Germán Ferreyra
CB	27	(Australia) Kai Trewin
LB	16	(Australia) Aziz Behich (c)
CM	6	(Australia) Steven Ugarkovic
CM	7	(Australia) Mathew Leckie	(yellow card) 79'
RW	10	(Israel) Yonatan Cohen	(yellow card) 33'	(substituted off) 90+7'
AM	30	(Austria) Andreas Kuen		(substituted off) 79'
LW	23	(Australia) Marco Tilio	(yellow card) 90+6'
CF	17	(Australia) Max Caputo		(substituted off) 65'
Substitutes:
GK	18	(Australia) Dakota Ochsenham
DF	2	(Australia) Callum Talbot		(substituted on) 90+7'
MF	19	(Australia) Zane Schreiber
MF	21	(Australia) Alessandro Lopane		(substituted on) 79'
MF	41	(Australia) Lawrence Wong
MF	47	(Australia) Kavian Rahmani
FW	35	(Australia) Medin Memeti		(substituted on) 65'
Manager:
(Australia) Aurelio Vidmar

GK	25	(Australia) Jack Duncan
RB	22	(Australia) Joshua Rawlins	(yellow card) 73'
CB	21	(Portugal) Roderick Miranda (c)
CB	4	(Australia) Lachlan Jackson		(substituted off) 74'
LB	28	(Australia) Kasey Bos
CM	6	(Australia) Ryan Teague	(yellow card) 86'
CM	14	(Australia) Jordi Valadon
RW	7	(Australia) Daniel Arzani		(substituted off) 89'
AM	8	(France) Zinédine Machach		(substituted off) 89'
LW	11	(Brazil) Clarismario Santos		(substituted off) 60'
CF	10	(Australia) Bruno Fornaroli		(substituted off) 74'
Substitutes:
GK	1	(Australia) Mitchell Langerak
DF	3	(Ivory Coast) Adama Traoré
DF	16	(Australia) Joshua Inserra	(yellow card) 78'	(substituted on) 74'
MF	23	(Australia) Alexander Badolato		(substituted on) 60'
MF	27	(Australia) Reno Piscopo		(substituted on) 89'
FW	9	(Greece) Nikos Vergos		(substituted on) 74'
FW	19	(Australia) Jing Reec		(substituted on) 89'
Manager:
(Australia) Arthur Diles

Man of the Match (Joe Marston Medal):
Mathew Leckie (Melbourne City)

Assistant referees:
George Lakrindis (Victoria)
Emma Kocbek (New South Wales)
Fourth official:
Shaun Evans (Victoria)
Reserve assistant referee:
Hugh Fenton-White (New South Wales)
Video assistant referee:
Lara Lee (Queensland)
Assistant video assistant referees:
Alex King (Queensland)
Kearney Robinson (New South Wales)

Match rules

- 90 minutes.
- 30 minutes of extra time if necessary.
- Penalty shoot-out if scores still level.
- Seven named substitutes.
- Maximum of five substitutions, with a sixth allowed in extra time. (Note: Each team is given only three opportunities to make substitutions, with a fourth opportunity in extra time, excluding substitutions made at half-time, before the start of extra time and at half-time in extra time.)
