= 2024–25 Auckland FC season =

Auckland FC
2024–25 season
- Owner: Black Knight Football and Entertainment
- Chairman: Bill Foley
- Head Coach: Steve Corica
- Stadium: Go Media Stadium
- A-League Men: 1st
- A-League Men Finals: Semi-final
- Top goalscorer: League: Guillermo May; Logan Rogerson (9); All: Guillermo May; Logan Rogerson (9)
- Highest home attendance: 29,148 vs. Melbourne Victory (24 May 2025); A-League Men finals
- Lowest home attendance: 13,138 vs. Newcastle Jets (30 November 2024); A-League Men
- Average home league attendance: 18,101
- Biggest win: 6–1 vs. Wellington Phoenix (H) (22 February 2025); A-League Men
- Biggest defeat: 0–4 vs. Western United (H) (21 December 2024); A-League Men
Home colours	Away colours	Third colours
- All statistics correct as of 24 May 2025.

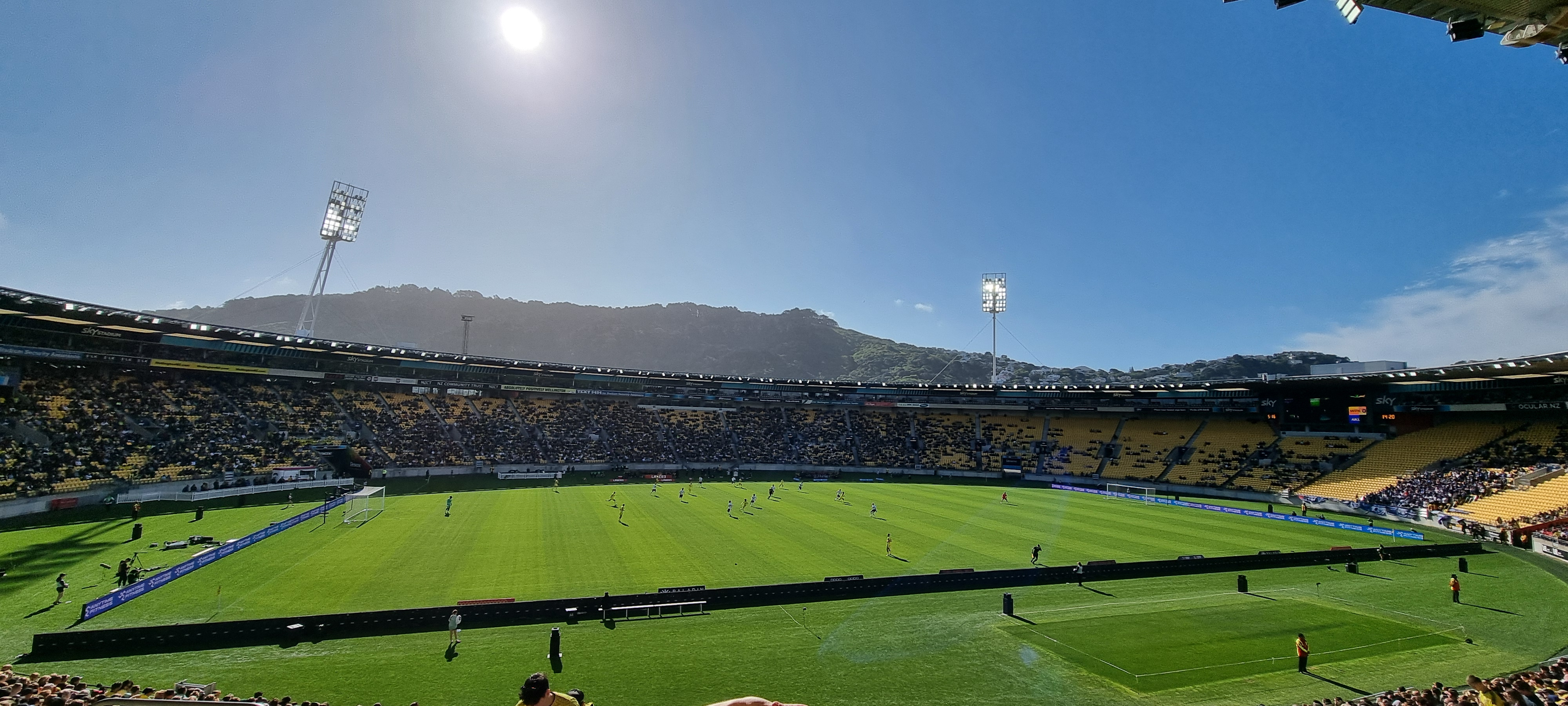
First ever New Zealand derby match between Wellington Phoenix and Auckland FC at Sky Stadium, Wellington on 2 November 2024.

The 2024–25 Auckland Football Club season was the club's first season in existence and their inaugural season in the A-League Men, the top flight of Australian soccer. The season will cover the period from 1 June 2024 until 30 June 2025.

== Notable events ==
=== Initial success ===
Auckland FC played their first competitive match in Round 1 on 21 October 2024 against Brisbane Roar, winning 2–0. The side maintained unbeaten until 21 December winning 6 out of 7 games, this run included going 532 minutes before conceding their first goal, the longest time before conceding their first goal in A-League history.

=== New Zealand Derby ===
The season saw the introduction of the New Zealand Derby between Auckland FC and Wellington Phoenix.

The first meeting between the sides took place on 2 November 2024 at Wellington Regional Stadium, where Auckland FC recorded a 2–0 victory after a late brace from Jake Brimmer. The return fixture on 7 December 2024 at Mount Smart Stadium ended in a 2–1 win for Auckland. The third meeting, played on 22 February 2025, resulted in a 6–1 victory for Auckland, which marked Auckland's biggest winning margin, and also the club's first hat-trick scored by Logan Rogerson. Auckland FC won all three meetings during the season.

=== Finals Series ===
Auckland finished 1st in the regular season, claiming the Premiership title and securing automatic qualification to the semi-final stage of the finals series played over two legs for a place in the Grand Final. Melbourne Victory earned the right to play Auckland after defeating Western Sydney Wanderers in the Elimination Final. Auckland defeated Victory 1–0 in the first leg at AAMI Park, but succumbed to a 2–0 defeat in the second leg at Mount Smart Stadium in front of a season best crowd of 29,148.

== Players ==
Note: Flags indicate national team as defined under FIFA eligibility rules; some limited exceptions apply. Players may hold more than one non-FIFA nationality.

No.	Pos.	Nation	Player
1	GK	NZL	Michael Woud
2	DF	JPN	Hiroki Sakai (captain)
3	DF	AUS	Scott Galloway
4	DF	NZL	Nando Pijnaker
5	DF	NZL	Tommy Smith (vice-captain)
6	MF	BEL	Louis Verstraete
7	MF	NZL	Cam Howieson
8	MF	NZL	Luis Toomey (scholarship)
9	FW	NZL	Max Mata (on loan from Shrewsbury Town)
10	FW	URU	Guillermo May
11	FW	AUS	Marlee Francois
12	GK	NZL	Alex Paulsen (on loan from Bournemouth)
14	FW	NZL	Liam Gillion (scholarship)

No.	Pos.	Nation	Player
15	DF	NZL	Francis de Vries
16	MF	NZL	Adama Coulibaly (scholarship)
17	DF	NZL	Callan Elliot
18	MF	NZL	Finn McKenlay (scholarship)
19	MF	NZL	Oliver Middleton (scholarship)
21	FW	NZL	Jesse Randall
22	MF	AUS	Jake Brimmer (vice-captain)
23	DF	FIJ	Dan Hall
25	FW	COL	Neyder Moreno
27	FW	NZL	Logan Rogerson
28	MF	CHI	Felipe Gallegos
30	GK	NZL	Joseph Knowles (scholarship)
35	FW	NZL	Jonty Bidois (scholarship)

=== Other players with first-team appearances ===
Note: Flags indicate national team as defined under FIFA eligibility rules; some limited exceptions apply. Players may hold more than one non-FIFA nationality.

No.	Pos.	Nation	Player
34	DF	NZL	Codey Phoenix

== Transfers ==
Note: Transfers' in/out date may refer to the date of announcement and not the date of signing from the mentioned players.

=== Transfers in ===
No.	Position	Name	From	Type/fee	Contract length	Date	Ref.
1	GK	Michael Woud	Unattached	Free transfer	3 years	30 May 2024	
15	DF	Francis de Vries	(New Zealand) Eastern Suburbs	Free transfer	2 years	30 May 2024	
7	MF	Cameron Howieson	(New Zealand) Auckland City	Free transfer	2 years	30 May 2024	
21	FW	Jesse Randall	(New Zealand) Wellington Olympic	Free transfer	2 years	30 May 2024	
5	DF	Tommy Smith	Macarthur FC	Free transfer	1 year	3 June 2024	
9	FW	Max Mata	(England) Shrewsbury Town	Loan	1 year	3 June 2024	
8	MF	Luis Toomey	(New Zealand) Eastern Suburbs	Free transfer	1 year (scholarship)	20 June 2024	
14	FW	Liam Gillion	(New Zealand) Auckland City	Free transfer	2 years (scholarship)	20 June 2024	
18	MF	Finn McKenlay	(New Zealand) Eastern Suburbs	Free transfer	2 years (scholarship)	20 June 2024	
16	MF	Adama Coulibaly	(New Zealand) Western Springs	Free transfer	2 years (scholarship)	20 June 2024	
19	MF	Oliver Middleton	(New Zealand) Auckland United	Free transfer	2 years (scholarship)	20 June 2024	
35	FW	Jonty Bidois	(New Zealand) Tauranga City	Free transfer	2 years (scholarship)	20 June 2024	
23	DF	(Fiji) Dan Hall	Central Coast Mariners	Free transfer	2 years	2 July 2024	
11	FW	Joe Champness	Unattached	Free transfer	1 year	3 July 2024	
17	DF	Callan Elliot	Unattached	Free transfer	3 years	3 July 2024	
3	DF	(Australia) Scott Galloway	Melbourne City	Free transfer	2 years	3 July 2024	
22	MF	(Australia) Jake Brimmer	Unattached	Free transfer	4 years	9 July 2024	
2	DF	(Japan) Hiroki Sakai	(Japan) Urawa Red Diamonds	Free transfer	1 year	25 July 2024	
27	FW	Logan Rogerson	(Armenia) Noah	Free transfer	1 year	29 July 2024	
30	GK	Joseph Knowles	(New Zealand) Eastern Suburbs	Free transfer	1 year (scholarship)	29 July 2024	
12	GK	Alex Paulsen	(England) Bournemouth	Loan	1 year	9 August 2024	
4	DF	Nando Pijnaker	(Republic of Ireland) Sligo Rovers	Free transfer	3 years	3 September 2024	
28	MF	(Chile) Felipe Gallegos	(Greece) OFI	Free transfer	2 years	17 September 2024	
10	FW	(Uruguay) Guillermo May	(Argentina) Newell's Old Boys	Free transfer	1 year	17 September 2024	
6	MF	(Belgium) Louis Verstraete	(Belgium) Beveren	Free transfer	2 years	17 September 2024	
25	FW	(Colombia) Neyder Moreno	(Colombia) Atlético Nacional	Free transfer	1 year	14 October 2024	
11	FW	(Australia) Marlee Francois	Unattached	Free transfer		9 January 2025	

=== Transfers out ===
No.	Position	Player	Transferred to	Type/fee	Date	Ref.
11	FW	Joe Champness	Unattached	Mutual contract termination	23 December 2024	

=== Contract extensions ===
No.	Position	Player	Duration	Date	Notes	Ref
2	Right-back	(Japan) Hiroki Sakai	1 year	18 February 2025	Contract extended from end of 2024–25 to end of 2025–26.	
5	Centre-back	Tommy Smith		29 March 2025	Contract extended from end of 2024–25.	
10	Forward	(Uruguay) Guillermo May		29 March 2025	Contract extended from end of 2024–25.	
30	Goalkeeper	Joseph Knowles		29 March 2025	Contract extended from end of 2024–25 to end of 2025–26.	

== Pre-season and friendlies ==
31 July 2024	Auckland United (New Zealand)	2–2	(New Zealand) Auckland FC	Auckland
19:35 NZST	Curry 9'; Phoenix 55'	Report (NZF); Report	Mata 27'; Toomey 80'	Stadium: Keith Hay Park; Referee: Ashley Wilson

7 August 2024	Birkenhead United (New Zealand)	Cancelled	(New Zealand) Auckland FC	Auckland
19:30 NZST		Source		Stadium: Shepherds Park
Note: Game was cancelled due to Birkenhead's rescheduled Northern League fixture.

7 August 2024	Auckland FC (New Zealand)	1–0	(New Zealand) East Coast Bays	Auckland
19:30 NZST	Toomey 39'	Report (NZF); Report		Stadium: Fred Taylor Park; Referee: Nick Waldron

13 August 2024	Newcastle Jets (Australia)	2–2	(New Zealand) Auckland FC	Sydney
	Natta ?'; Vidic ?'	Report (Auckland FC); Report (Newcastle Herald)	Rogerson 1'; ? ?' (o.g.)	Stadium: Leichhardt Oval

17 August 2024	Western Sydney Wanderers (Australia)	4–2	(New Zealand) Auckland FC	Sydney
13:00 AEST	Milanovic 21'; Borrello 38'; Sapsford 66', 90'	Report	Gillion 49'; Mata 81'	Stadium: Wanderers Football Park

21 August 2024	Central Coast Mariners (Australia)	2–2	(New Zealand) Auckland FC	Gosford
13:00 AEST	Di Pizio ?'; Doka ?'	Report	Rogerson 44'; Gillion 83'	Stadium: Industree Group Stadium; Attendance: 0 (behind closed doors)

21 September 2024	Melbourne City (Australia)	3–1	(New Zealand) Auckland FC	Melbourne
	Nabbout ?'; Memeti ?'; Talbot ?'	Report	Gillion ?'	Attendance: 0 (behind closed doors)

25 September 2024	Western United (Australia)	1–2	(New Zealand) Auckland FC	Melbourne
13:00 AEST	Lavale 23'	Report	Bidois 68'; Rogerson 72'	Stadium: Ironbark Fields

2 October 2024	Auckland FC (New Zealand)	2–0	(New Zealand) Birkenhead United	Auckland
18:30 NZST		Report (NZF); Report		Stadium: North Harbour Stadium; Attendance: 0 (behind closed doors); Referee: Luke Gardner

2 October 2024	Auckland FC (New Zealand)	2–0	(New Zealand) Western Springs	Auckland
19:40 NZST		Report (NZF); Report		Stadium: North Harbour Stadium; Attendance: 0 (behind closed doors); Referee: Veer Singh

6 October 2024	Auckland FC (New Zealand)	5–0	(New Zealand) Melville United	Auckland
13:00 NZST		Report (NZF); Report		Stadium: Mount Smart Stadium; Attendance: 0 (behind closed doors); Referee: Ashley Wilson

11 October 2024	Auckland FC (New Zealand)	1–1	Malaysia	Auckland
	de Vries 25'	Report	Laine 59'	Stadium: Go Media Stadium; Attendance: 0 (behind closed doors)

16 October 2024	Auckland FC (New Zealand)	5–0	(New Zealand) Auckland United	Auckland
11:00 NZST		Report (NZF)		Stadium: North Harbour Stadium; Referee: Ashley Wilson

16 October 2024	Auckland FC (New Zealand)	5–0	(New Zealand) East Coast Bays	Auckland
12:10 NZST		Report (NZF)		Stadium: North Harbour Stadium; Referee: Benjamin Norman

== Competitions ==
=== Overall record ===
Competition	First match	Last match	Starting round	Final position	Record							
Competition	First match	Last match	Starting round	Final position	Pld	W	D	L	GF	GA	GD	Win %
A-League Men	19 October 2024	3 May 2025	Matchday 1	Winners	26	15	8	3	49	27	+22	57.69
A-League Men Finals	17 May 2025	24 May 2025	Semi-final	Semi-final	2	1	0	1	1	3	−2	50.00
Total					28	16	8	4	50	30	+20	57.14

Last updated: 24 May 2025
Source: Competitions

=== A-League Men ===
==== League table ====
Pos	Team	Pld	W	D	L	GF	GA	GD	Pts	Qualification
1	Auckland FC (Note: Auckland FC and Wellington Phoenix cannot qualify for Asian Football Confederation competitions as they are based in New Zealand, which is part of the Oceania Football Confederation.)	26	15	8	3	49	27	+22	53	Qualification for Finals series (Note: The top two teams enter the finals series at the semi-finals, while the teams ranked third to sixth enter the finals series at the elimination-finals.)
2	Melbourne City (C)	26	14	6	6	41	25	+16	48	Qualification for AFC Champions League Elite and Finals series
3	Western United	26	14	5	7	55	37	+18	47	Qualification for Finals series
4	Western Sydney Wanderers	26	13	7	6	58	40	+18	46	Qualification for Finals series
5	Melbourne Victory	26	12	7	7	44	36	+8	43	Qualification for Finals series

Source: A-Leagues
Rules for classification: 1) points; 2) goal difference; 3) goals scored; 4) wins; 5) head-to-head results; 5a) head-to-head points; 5b) head-to-head goal difference; 6) Fair Play points; 7) away goal difference; 8) away goals per match; 9) home goal difference; 10) home goals per match; 11) toss of a coin in an event of a tie of two clubs.
(C) Champions

==== Results summary ====
Overall								Home						Away					
Pld	W	D	L	GF	GA	GD	Pts	W	D	L	GF	GA	GD	W	D	L	GF	GA	GD
26	15	8	3	49	27	+22	53	8	4	1	26	14	+12	7	4	2	23	13	+10

Last updated: 3 May 2025.
Source: Ultimate A-League
Away figures include Auckland FC's 1–0 win on neutral ground in Unite Round against Macarthur FC on 24 November 2024.

==== Results by round ====
Round	1	2	3	4	5	6	7	8	9	10	11	12	13	15	14	16	17	18	19	20	21	22	23	24	25	26	27	28	29
Ground	H	H	A	B	N	H	H	A	H	A	H	B	A	H	A	A	H	B	A	H	H	A	H	A	H	A	A	H	A
Result	W	W	W	X	W	W	W	D	L	W	D	X	L	W	D	W	W	X	W	W	D	D	D	W	D	D	W	W	L
Position	2	1	1	3	1	1	1	1	1	1	1	1	3	2	2	1	1	1	1	1	1	1	1	1	1	1	1	1	1
Points	3	6	9	9	12	15	18	19	19	22	23	23	23	26	27	30	33	33	36	39	40	41	42	45	46	47	50	53	53

Updated to match(es) played on 3 May 2025. Source: Ultimate A-League
A = Away; H = Home; N = Neutral; B = Bye; W = Win; D = Draw; L = Loss; X = Bye

==== Matches ====
Win Draw Loss Fixtures

19 October 2024 1	Auckland FC	2–0	Brisbane Roar	Auckland
17:00 NZDT	Van Der Saag 8' (o.g.); Rogerson 74'	Report		Stadium: Go Media Stadium; Attendance: 24,492; Referee: Daniel Elder

27 October 2024 2	Auckland FC	1–0	Sydney FC	Auckland
16:00 NZDT	Pijnaker 90+7'	Report		Stadium: Go Media Stadium; Attendance: 14,253; Referee: Shaun Evans

2 November 2024 3	Wellington Phoenix	0–2	Auckland FC	Wellington
17:00 NZDT		Report	Brimmer 89', 90+6'	Stadium: Sky Stadium; Attendance: 26,252; Referee: Adam Kersey

24 November 2024 5	Macarthur FC	0–1	Auckland FC	Sydney
16:00 AEDT		Report	May 34'	Stadium: Allianz Stadium; Attendance: 4,826; Referee: Ben Abraham

30 November 2024 6	Auckland FC	2–0	Newcastle Jets	Auckland
17:00 NZDT	Moreno 84'; de Vries 89'	Report		Stadium: Go Media Stadium; Attendance: 13,138; Referee: Tim Danaskos

7 December 2024 7	Auckland FC	2–1	Wellington Phoenix	Auckland
17:00 NZDT	Hughes 31' (o.g.); Pijnaker 70'	Report	Barbarouses 81'	Stadium: Go Media Stadium; Attendance: 26,253; Referee: Shaun Evans

15 December 2024 8	Melbourne City	2–2	Auckland FC	Melbourne
17:00 AEDT	Memeti 18'; Pijnaker 79' (o.g.)	Report	May 53'; Moreno 90+5'	Stadium: AAMI Park; Attendance: 5,482; Referee: Ben Abraham

21 December 2024 9	Auckland FC	0–4	Western United	Auckland
17:00 NZDT		Report	Danzaki 17' (pen.); Botic 23'; Ibusuki 34'; Grimaldi 87'	Stadium: Go Media Stadium; Attendance: 13,681; Referee: Casey Reibelt

28 December 2024 10	Central Coast Mariners	1–4	Auckland FC	Gosford
17:00 AEDT	McCalmont 15'	Report	Sakai 12'; Brimmer 31'; May 39'; Rogerson 84'	Stadium: Industree Group Stadium; Attendance: 6,338; Referee: Shaun Evans

1 January 2025 11	Auckland FC	0–0	Melbourne Victory	Auckland
17:00 NZDT		Report		Stadium: Go Media Stadium; Attendance: 14,997; Referee: Alireza Faghani

11 January 2025 13	Perth Glory	1–0	Auckland FC	Perth
16:45 AWST	Pearman 29'	Report		Stadium: HBF Park; Attendance: 5,390; Referee: Nathan Shakespear

18 January 2025 15	Auckland FC	3–0	Melbourne City	Auckland
17:00 NZDT	May 32'; Pijnaker 40'; Mata 45+3'	Report		Stadium: Go Media Stadium; Attendance: 14,131; Referee: Ben Abraham

22 January 2025 14	Adelaide United	2–2	Auckland FC	Adelaide
19:00 ACDT	Goodwin 81', 90+5'	Report	Moreno 66'; Rogerson 90+9'	Stadium: Coopers Stadium; Attendance: 12,171; Referee: Alex King

26 January 2025 16	Western Sydney Wanderers	0–1	Auckland FC	Sydney
17:00 AEDT		Report	Moreno 90+5'	Stadium: CommBank Stadium; Attendance: 7,410; Referee: Shaun Evans

1 February 2025 17	Auckland FC	2–1	Macarthur FC	Auckland
17:00 NZDT	Moreno 9'; Verstraete 80'	Report	Hollman 19'	Stadium: Go Media Stadium; Attendance: 14,051; Referee: Lachlan Keevers

15 February 2025 19	Western United	0–2	Auckland FC	Melbourne
18:00 AEDT		Report	May 44'; Mata 45+2'	Stadium: Ironbark Fields; Attendance: 3,862; Referee: Tim Danaskos

22 February 2025 20	Auckland FC	6–1	Wellington Phoenix	Auckland
17:00 NZDT	Moreno 31', 60'; Rogerson 36', 40', 80'; Randall 90+3'	Report	Brooke-Smith 49'	Stadium: Go Media Stadium; Attendance: 27,009; Referee: Ben Abraham

1 March 2025 21	Auckland FC	4–4	Adelaide United	Auckland
17:00 NZDT	May 10', 14'; Rogerson 52'; Sakai 90+2'	Report	Elsey 30'; Clough 61' (pen.), 79' (pen.); Vriends 90+8'	Stadium: Go Media Stadium; Attendance: 16,709; Referee: Daniel Elder

9 March 2025 22	Newcastle Jets	1–1	Auckland FC	Newcastle
17:00 AEDT	Adams 13'	Report	Randall 37'	Stadium: McDonald Jones Stadium; Attendance: 6,130; Referee: Nathan Shakespear

16 March 2025 23	Auckland FC	2–2	Central Coast Mariners	Auckland
17:00 NZDT	May 10'; Elliot 78'	Report	Feijão 71'; Duarte 90'	Stadium: Go Media Stadium; Attendance: 14,040; Referee: Adam Kersey

30 March 2025 24	Brisbane Roar	0–2	Auckland FC	Brisbane
16:00 AEST		Report	Pijnaker 45+3'; Sakai 85'	Stadium: Suncorp Stadium; Attendance: 5,466; Referee: Alireza Faghani

5 April 2025 25	Auckland FC	1–1	Western Sydney Wanderers	Auckland
17:00 NZDT	Gallegos 45'	Report	Milanovic 51'	Stadium: Go Media Stadium; Attendance: 18,340; Referee: Alex King

12 April 2025 26	Sydney FC	2–2	Auckland FC	Sydney
17:00 AEDT	Segecic 12', 32'		Rogerson 35'; de Vries 68'	Stadium: Allianz Stadium; Attendance: 18,437; Referee: Alex King

19 April 2025 27	Melbourne Victory	0–2	Auckland FC	Melbourne
17:00 AEDT		Report	Verstraete 53'; May 89'	Stadium: AAMI Park; Attendance: 13,564; Referee: Ben Abraham

27 April 2025 28	Auckland FC	1–0	Perth Glory	Auckland
17:00 NZDT	Francois 62'	Report		Stadium: Go Media Stadium; Attendance: 24,221; Referee: Adam Kersey

3 May 2025 29	Western United	4–2	Auckland FC	Melbourne
18:00 AEDT	Ruhs 18'; Botic 23'; Thurgate 49'; Lavale 90+6'	Report	Moreno 62'; Randall 90+4'	Stadium: Ironbark Fields; Attendance: 3,109; Referee: Daniel Elder

==== Finals series ====
17 May 2025 Semi-final 1st leg	Melbourne Victory	0–1	Auckland FC	Melbourne
19:35 AEST		Report	Rogerson 64'	Stadium: AAMI Park; Attendance: 14,121; Referee: Ben Abraham

24 May 2025 Semi-final 2nd leg	Auckland FC	0–2 (1–2 agg.)	Melbourne Victory	Auckland
16:00 AEST		Report	Machach 55'; Fornaroli 60'	Stadium: Go Media Stadium; Attendance: 29,148; Referee: Alex King

== Statistics ==
=== Appearances and goals ===
Includes all competitions. Players with no appearances not included in the list.

As of 24 May 2025

No.	Pos	Nat	Player	Total		A-League Men		A-League Men Finals	
No.	Pos	Nat	Player	Apps	Goals	Apps	Goals	Apps	Goals
Goalkeepers
12	GK	(New Zealand) NZL	Alex Paulsen	28	0	26	0	2	0
Defenders
2	DF	(Japan) JPN	Hiroki Sakai	25	3	23	3	2	0
3	DF	(Australia) AUS	Scott Galloway	4	0	0+4	0	0	0
4	DF	(New Zealand) NZL	Nando Pijnaker	27	4	25	4	2	0
5	DF	(New Zealand) NZL	Tommy Smith	23	0	10+12	0	0+1	0
15	DF	(New Zealand) NZL	Francis de Vries	28	2	26	2	2	0
17	DF	(New Zealand) NZL	Callan Elliot	20	1	6+12	1	0+2	0
23	DF	(Fiji) FIJ	Dan Hall	15	0	13	0	2	0
Midfielders
6	MF	(Belgium) BEL	Louis Verstraete	25	2	20+3	2	2	0
7	MF	(New Zealand) NZL	Cameron Howieson	20	0	3+16	0	0+1	0
8	MF	(New Zealand) NZL	Luis Toomey	8	0	0+8	0	0	0
16	MF	(New Zealand) NZL	Adama Coulibaly	2	0	0+2	0	0	0
18	MF	(New Zealand) NZL	Finn McKenlay	2	0	1+1	0	0	0
22	MF	(Australia) AUS	Jake Brimmer	27	3	18+7	3	0+2	0
25	MF	(Colombia) COL	Neyder Moreno	24	8	10+12	8	0+2	0
28	MF	(Chile) CHI	Felipe Gallegos	27	1	23+2	1	2	0
Forwards
9	FW	(New Zealand) NZL	Max Mata	19	2	11+8	2	0	0
10	FW	(Uruguay) URU	Guillermo May	28	9	26	9	2	0
11	FW	(Australia) AUS	Marlee Francois	16	1	5+9	1	2	0
14	FW	(New Zealand) NZL	Liam Gillion	15	0	11+2	0	0+2	0
21	FW	(New Zealand) NZL	Jesse Randall	20	3	5+13	3	2	0
27	FW	(New Zealand) NZL	Logan Rogerson	28	9	22+4	8	2	1
35	FW	(New Zealand) NZL	Jonty Bidois	3	0	0+3	0	0	0

=== Disciplinary record ===
Includes all competitions. The list is sorted by squad number when total cards are equal. Players with no cards not included in the list.

As of 24 May 2025

Rank	No.	Pos.	Nat.	Name	A-League Men			A-League Men Finals			Total							
Rank	No.	Pos.	Nat.	Name	Booked	(yellow card) (yellow-red card)	Sent off (straight red)	Booked	(yellow card) (yellow-red card)	Sent off (straight red)	Booked	(yellow card) (yellow-red card)	Sent off (straight red)					
Rank	No.	Pos.	Nat.	Name	1	6	MF	(Belgium)	Louis Verstraete	6	0	1	0	0	0	6	0	1
2	16	MF	(New Zealand)	Adama Coulibaly	1	0	1	0	0	0	1	0	1					
3	4	DF	(New Zealand)	Nando Pijnaker	5	0	0	1	0	0	6	0	0					
3	28	MF	(Chile)	Felipe Gallegos	5	0	0	1	0	0	6	0	0					
5	7	MF	(New Zealand)	Cameron Howieson	4	0	0	0	0	0	4	0	0					
6	2	DF	(Japan)	Hiroki Sakai	2	0	0	0	0	0	2	0	0					
6	9	FW	(New Zealand)	Max Mata	2	0	0	0	0	0	2	0	0					
6	11	FW	(Australia)	Marlee Francois	1	0	0	1	0	0	2	0	0					
6	15	DF	(New Zealand)	Francis de Vries	2	0	0	0	0	0	2	0	0					
6	17	DF	(New Zealand)	Callan Elliot	2	0	0	0	0	0	2	0	0					
6	22	MF	(Australia)	Jake Brimmer	2	0	0	0	0	0	2	0	0					
6	23	DF	(Fiji)	Dan Hall	2	0	0	0	0	0	2	0	0					
6	27	FW	(New Zealand)	Logan Rogerson	2	0	0	0	0	0	2	0	0					
14	5	DF	(New Zealand)	Tommy Smith	1	0	0	0	0	0	1	0	0					
14	12	GK	(New Zealand)	Alex Paulsen	1	0	0	0	0	0	1	0	0					
14	18	MF	(New Zealand)	Finn McKenlay	1	0	0	0	0	0	1	0	0					
14	21	FW	(New Zealand)	Jesse Randall	1	0	0	0	0	0	1	0	0					
14	25	MF	(Colombia)	Neyder Moreno	1	0	0	0	0	0	1	0	0					
Total					40	0	2	4	0	0	44	0	2					

=== Clean sheets ===
Includes all competitions. The list is sorted by squad number when total clean sheets are equal. Numbers in parentheses represent games where both goalkeepers participated and both kept a clean sheet; the number in parentheses is awarded to the goalkeeper who was substituted on, whilst a full clean sheet is awarded to the goalkeeper who was on the field at the start of play. Goalkeepers with no clean sheets not included in the list.

As of 24 May 2025

Rank	No.	Nat.	Goalkeeper	A-League Men	A-League Men Finals	Total
1	12	(New Zealand)	Alex Paulsen	12	1	13
Total				12	1	13

== Awards ==
=== Players ===
No.	Pos.	Player	Award	Source
2	DF	(Japan) Hiroki Sakai	PFA Team of the Season	
4	DF	(New Zealand) Nando Pijnaker	PFA Team of the Season	
6	MF	(Belgium) Louis Verstraete	PFA Team of the Season	
10	FW	(Uruguay) Guillermo May	Auckland FC Club MVP	
10	FW	(Uruguay) Guillermo May	PFA Team of the Season	
12	GK	(New Zealand) Alex Paulsen	Auckland FC Players’ Player of the Season	
12	GK	(New Zealand) Alex Paulsen	A-League Men Goalkeeper of the Year	
12	GK	(New Zealand) Alex Paulsen	A-League Save of the Year	
12	GK	(New Zealand) Alex Paulsen	PFA Team of the Season (Note: named as Captain)	
15	DF	(New Zealand) Francis de Vries	A-League Men Player of the Month (December)	
15	DF	(New Zealand) Francis de Vries	Auckland FC Members' Player of the Season	
15	DF	(New Zealand) Francis de Vries	A-League Men Fan Player of the Year	
15	DF	(New Zealand) Francis de Vries	PFA Team of the Season	
25	MF	(Colombia) Neyder Moreno	A-League Men Player of the Month (February)	
25	MF	(Colombia) Neyder Moreno	Auckland FC Goal of the Season (Note: vs Newcastle Jets, 30 November 2024)	

=== Managers ===
Manager	Award	Source
(Australia) Steve Corica	A-League Men Coach of the Month (October/November)	
(Australia) Steve Corica	A-League Men Coach of the Month (December)	
(Australia) Steve Corica	A-League Men Coach of the Month (January)	
(Australia) Steve Corica	A-League Men Coach of the Month (February)	
(Australia) Steve Corica	A-League Men Coach of the Month (March)	
(Australia) Steve Corica	A-League Men Coach of the Month (April)	
(Australia) Steve Corica	A-League Men Coach of the Year	
(Australia) Steve Corica	PFA Team of the Season	
