= Guillermo May =

Uruguayan footballer (born 1998)

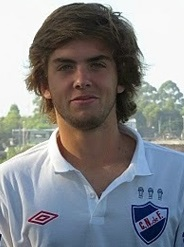
- May with Nacional in 2014

Personal information
- Full name: Luis Guillermo May Bartesaghi
- Date of birth: 11 March 1998 (age 28)
- Place of birth: Montevideo, Uruguay
- Height: 1.78 m (5 ft 10 in)
- Position: Forward

Team information
- Current team: Melbourne Victory
- Number: 21

Youth career
- Nacional

Senior career*
Years	Team	Apps	(Gls)
2018–2021	Nacional	5	(1)
2018–2019	→ Deportivo Fabril (loan)	29	(4)
2020–2021	→ Cerro Largo (loan)	27	(7)
2022–2023	Danubio	58	(16)
2023–2024	Newell's Old Boys	5	(0)
2024–2026	Auckland FC	50	(14)
2026–	Melbourne Victory	3	(0)
- * Club domestic league appearances and goals as of 1 November 2026

Luis Guillermo May Bartesaghi (Latin American Spanish: [lwis ɣiˈʃeɾmo maj], (Note: As pronounced in Uruguayan Spanish using sheísmo. Using zheísmo, Guillermo is pronounced [ɣiˈʒeɾmo], though May himself uses sheísmo as it is more common among younger speakers of Rioplatense Spanish.) Italian: [bar.teˈza.ɡi]; born 11 March 1998), known as Guillermo May, is a Uruguayan professional footballer who plays as a forward for A-League club Melbourne Victory.

== Career ==
A youth academy product of Nacional, May was part of club's under-20 team which won 2018 U-20 Copa Libertadores. He scored 4 goals from 5 matches in the tournament, including a hat-trick against Colo-Colo in group stage.

Deportivo Fabril, reserve team of Deportivo de La Coruña announced the loan signing of May in July 2018. He played 29 matches and scored four goals for the club in Spanish third division.

May joined Uruguayan top division club Cerro Largo on loan prior to 2020 Uruguayan Primera División season. He made his professional debut on 9 March 2020 in a 0–0 draw against Boston River.

On 17 September 2024, May joined Auckland FC alongside two other international visa players, Luis Felipe Gallegos and Louis Verstraete, agreeing a move to the club for their inaugural season.

On 19 October 2024, May made his debut for Auckland FC, assisting Logan Rogerson in the club's second ever goal in a 2–0 win over Brisbane Roar.

He scored his first goal for Auckland FC in a 1–0 away win over Macarthur FC. May finished the 2024–25 season as Auckland FC's leading scorer with nine goals, helping the club win the A-League Men Premiership and earning the inaugural player of the season award.

On 6 December 2025, May came on as a second-half substitute in the 5th iteration of the New Zealand Derby over Wellington Phoenix, scoring his first goal of the 2025–26 season during the 3–1 win, with the goal he became the first Auckland FC player to reach double figures in goals. His second season was less prolific, with May scoring five goals. His final goal for the club came on 2 May 2026 in an elimination final against Melbourne City in the finals series. His last appearance was in a 1–1 draw with Adelaide United in the first leg of the semi-finals, where he suffered a syndesmosis injury.

On 12 June 2026, May departed Auckland FC after two seasons. He scored 16 goals and provided six assists in 58 appearances, leaving as the club's all-time leading goalscorer at the time of his departure.

On 13 September 2026, May joined Melbourne Victory for the 2026–27 season. May made his debut for the club in the 2026 Australia Cup final, coming off the bench in their loss against South Melbourne. May made his first start for Victory in their following match on 14 October, scoring in a 3–0 win over FC Seoul in the AFC Champions League Two.

== Career statistics ==
As of match played 14 October 2026

Appearances and goals by club, season and competition
Club	Season	League			Cup (Note: Includes Copa Argentina, Australia Cup)		Continental		Other		Total	
Club	Season	Division	Apps	Goals	Apps	Goals	Apps	Goals	Apps	Goals	Apps	Goals
Nacional	2018	Liga AUF Uruguaya	0	0	—		0	0	0	0	0	0
Nacional	2019	Liga AUF Uruguaya	0	0	—		0	0	0	0	0	0
Nacional	2020	Liga AUF Uruguaya	0	0	—		0	0	0	0	0	0
Nacional	2021	Liga AUF Uruguaya	5	1	—		1 (Note: Appearance in Copa Libertadores)	0	1 (Note: Appearance in Supercopa Uruguaya)	0	7	1
Nacional	Total		5	1	0	0	1	0	1	0	7	1
Deportivo Fabril (loan)	2018–19	Segunda División B	29	4	—		—		—		29	4
Cerro Largo (loan)	2020	Liga AUF Uruguaya	27	7	—		0	0	—		27	7
Danubio	2022	Liga AUF Uruguaya	36	7	0	0	—		—		36	7
Danubio	2023	Liga AUF Uruguaya	22	9	0	0	7 (Note: Appearances in Copa Sudamericana)	3	—		29	12
Danubio	Total		58	16	0	0	7	3	0	0	65	19
Newell's Old Boys	2023	AFA Liga Profesional de Fútbol	—		—		—		9 (Note: Appearances in Copa de la Liga Profesional)	2	9	2
Newell's Old Boys	2024	AFA Liga Profesional de Fútbol	5	0	2	1	—		12	0	19	1
Newell's Old Boys	Total		5	0	2	1	0	0	21	2	28	3
Auckland FC	2024–25	A-League Men	26	9	—		—		2 (Note: Appearances in A-League Men finals series)	0	28	9
Auckland FC	2025–26	A-League Men	24	5	4	1	—		2	1	30	7
Auckland FC	Total		50	14	4	1	0	0	4	1	58	16
Melbourne Victory	2026–27	A-League Men	0	0	1	0	1 (Note: Appearances in AFC Champions League Two)	1	—		2	1
Career total			174	42	7	2	9	4	26	3	216	51

== Honours ==
Nacional U20

- U-20 Copa Libertadores: 2018

Nacional

- Supercopa Uruguaya: 2021

Auckland FC

- A-League Premiership: 2024–25
- A-League Men Championship: 2026
