= Louis Verstraete =

Belgian footballer (born 1999)

Personal information
- Date of birth: 4 May 1999 (age 27)
- Place of birth: Brussels, Belgium
- Height: 1.86 m (6 ft 1 in)
- Position: Midfielder

Youth career
- –2016: Gent

Senior career*
Years	Team	Apps	(Gls)
2016–2020	Gent	15	(1)
2018–2019	→ Waasland-Beveren (loan)	41	(3)
2020–2021	Antwerp	7	(0)
2020	→ Oostende (loan)	4	(0)
2021	→ Waasland-Beveren (loan)	5	(3)
2021–2024	Beveren	59	(3)
2024–2026	Auckland FC	49	(4)
2026–	Patro Eisden	5	(0)

International career^{‡}
2016	Belgium U17	5	(0)
2016	Belgium U18	1	(0)
2016–2018	Belgium U19	10	(1)
2019	Belgium U21	3	(0)
- * Club domestic league appearances and goals as of 22 August 2026 ‡ National team caps and goals as of 18:41, 16 October 2019 (UTC)

Louis Verstraete (West Flemish: [ˈloː.i vɛrˈstraː.tə]; born 4 May 1999) is a Belgian professional footballer who plays as a midfielder for Challenger Pro League club Patro Eisden.

== Club career ==
=== Gent ===
In 2016, Verstraete signed a contract until 2018 with K.A.A. Gent's first team. On 22 December 2016, he made his senior team debut in the Belgian First Division A against Anderlecht, replacing Jérémy Perbet in the 83rd minute. On 16 March 2017, he scored his first senior goal for Gent in the UEFA Europa League round of 16 return game at Genk, making him the youngest goal scorer of that season's competition.

==== Loan to Waasland-Beveren ====
In December 2018, Verstraete moved to Belgium side Waasland-Beveren, on a loan deal until the end of the season.

=== Royal Antwerp ===
In January 2020, Verstraete signed a contract for 3.5 years with Jupiler Pro League club Royal Antwerp, and was loaned to KV Oostende for the first six months.

==== Loan to Waasland-Beveren (second stint) ====
In January 2021, Verstraete moved again on loan to Waasland-Beveren, until the end of the season. The loan deal includes a purchase option. On 18 April 2021, Verstraete became match winner for Waasland-Beveren in a crucial must-win match against Oud-Heverlee Leuven, in which he scored two goals to help the club avoid direct relegation.

=== Auckland FC ===
On 17 September 2024, Verstraete joined Auckland FC for their inaugural A-League Men's season, alongside two other international visa players, Luis Felipe Gallegos and Guillermo May. On 1 February 2025, Verstraete scored his first goal for the club in a 2–1 win over Macarthur FC. On 9 March, in a 1–1 draw with the Newcastle Jets, Verstraete received his first red card for the club, becoming only the second player in Auckland FC's history to be sent off, after Adama Coulibaly.

Verstraete made 25 appearances during the 2024–25 season, scoring two goals and providing three assists as Auckland secured the Premiership. His performances earned him a place in the Professional Footballers Australia (PFA) A-League Team of the Season, alongside teammates Hiroki Sakai, Francis de Vries, and Alex Paulsen.

Verstraete scored his first goal of the 2025–26 season in a 2–1 win over Adelaide United. Verstraete was awarded Auckland FC's A-League Men Most Valuable Player for the season. Verstraete missed just two matches across the campaign and finished the regular season with two goals and three assists in 24 regular season matches.

On 21 July 2026, the club announced that Verstraete had departed the club. Auckland FC stated that Verstraete would return to Belgium for personal and family reasons, with the club receiving an undisclosed transfer fee as part of the transfer.

== Career statistics ==
As of match played 22 August 2026

Club	Season	League			Cup (Note: Appearances in Belgian Cup, Australia Cup)		Continental		Other		Total	
Club	Season	Division	Apps	Goals	Apps	Goals	Apps	Goals	Apps	Goals	Apps	Goals
Gent	2016–17	Belgian First Division A	7	0	0	0	3 (Note: Appearances in UEFA Europa League)	1	0	0	0	0
Gent	2017–18	Belgian First Division A	3	1	0	0	0	0	0	0	0	0
Gent	2019–20	Belgian First Division A	5	0	2	0	4 (Note: Appearances in UEFA Europa League)	0	0	0	0	0
Gent	Total		15	1	2	0	7	1	0	0	24	2
SK Beveren (loan)	2017–18	Belgian First Division A	3	0	0	0	8 (Note: Appearances in UEFA Europa League Play-offs)	1	0	0	0	0
SK Beveren (loan)	2018–19	Belgian First Division A	25	1	1	0	5 (Note: Appearances in UEFA Europa League Play-offs)	1	0	0	0	0
SK Beveren (loan)	Total		28	1	1	0	13	2	0	0	42	3
Antwerp	2019–20	Belgian First Division A	0	0	0	0	0	0	0	0	0	0
Antwerp	2020–21	Belgian First Division A	3	0	0	0	0	0	0	0	0	0
Antwerp	2021–22	Belgian First Division A	4	0	0	0	0	0	0	0	0	0
K.V. Oostende (loan)	2019–20	Belgian First Division A	4	0	0	0	0	0	0	0	0	0
SK Beveren (loan)	2020–21	Belgian First Division A	7	3	0	0	0	0	0	0	0	0
SK Beveren (loan)	Total		18	3	0	0	0	0	0	0	18	3
SK Beveren	2021–22	Belgian First Division B	19	3	1	0	0	0	0	0	0	0
SK Beveren	2022–23	Belgian First Division B	15	0	0	0	0	0	0	0	0	0
SK Beveren	2023–24	Belgian First Division B	25	0	3	0	0	0	0	0	0	0
SK Beveren	Total		59	3	4	0	0	0	0	0	63	3
Auckland FC	2024–25	A-League Men	23	2	—		—		2 (Note: Appearances in A-League Finals)	0	25	2
Auckland FC	2025–26	A-League Men	24	2	2	0	—		4	0	30	2
Auckland FC	Total		47	4	2	0	—		6	0	55	4
Patro Eisden	2026–27	Belgian First Division B	2	0	0	0	0	0	0	0	2	0
Career total			169	12	9	0	20	3	6	0	204	15

== Honours ==
Auckland FC

- A-League Premiership: 2024–25
- A-League Men Championship: 2026
