= Joseph Knowles (footballer, born 2004) =

New Zealand footballer

Personal information
- Full name: Joseph James Knowles
- Date of birth: 2 November 2004 (age 21)
- Height: 1.88 m (6 ft 2 in)
- Position: Goalkeeper

Team information
- Current team: Auckland FC
- Number: 30

Youth career
- –2020: Bay Olympic

Senior career*
Years	Team	Apps	(Gls)
2020–2022	Melville United	1	(0)
2022	Eastern Suburbs	22	(0)
2022–2023	Miramar Rangers	7	(0)
2023–2024	Eastern Suburbs	26	(0)
2024	St George City	0	(0)
2024	Eastern Suburbs	7	(0)
2024–	Auckland FC	0	(0)
2025	Auckland FC Reserves	6	(0)

International career
2022	New Zealand U19	1	(0)
- * Club domestic league appearances and goals

Joseph Knowles (born 2 November 2004) is a New Zealand professional footballer who plays as a goalkeeper for A-League Men club Auckland FC.

== Club career ==
=== Early career ===
Knowles began his youth career with Bay Olympic and was selected for the Auckland Football under-15 representative squad in 2019. He also played for Melville United, appearing for the club's senior side from 2020.

Knowles joined Eastern Suburbs ahead of the 2022 season, making appearances in the Northern League and Chatham Cup, helping Suburbs reach the final of the Chatham Cup, where they lost 1–0 to Auckland City.

He then moved to Australia, joining St George City in the National Premier Leagues NSW.

=== Auckland FC ===
On 31 July 2024, Knowles joined Auckland FC ahead of their inaugural A-League Men season. During the 2024–25 season, Knowles played with the Auckland FC Reserves, and was third-choice goalkeeper for the first team behind Alex Paulsen and Michael Woud. Knowles spent much of the 2025–26 season sidelined with a hip injury and subsequently underwent surgery.

Knowles returned to the first-team in Auckland FC's pre-season friendly against Tottenham Hotspur at Eden Park on 26 July 2026. He replaced Michael Woud in the 72nd minute as Auckland lost 2–0.

== Honours ==
Auckland FC

- A-League Premiership: 2024–25
- A-League Men Championship: 2026

New Zealand U23

- OFC Men's Olympic Qualifying Tournament: 2023
