= Finn McKenlay =

New Zealand footballer (born 2005)

Personal information
- Full name: Finn Hunter McKenlay
- Date of birth: 4 September 2005 (age 21)
- Place of birth: London, England
- Position: Midfielder

Team information
- Current team: Finn Harps
- Number: 23

Youth career
- –2017: East Coast Bays
- 2018–2019: Onehunga Sports
- 2020–2021: East Coast Bays
- 2022–2023: Birkenhead United

Senior career*
Years	Team	Apps	(Gls)
2022–2023	Birkenhead United	12	(2)
2023–2024	Eastern Suburbs	17	(1)
2024–2026	Auckland FC	2	(0)
2025–2026	Auckland FC Reserves	11	(3)
2026–	Finn Harps	9	(0)

International career^{‡}
2023–	New Zealand U20	6	(0)
Medal record
Men's football
Representing New Zealand
OFC U-19 Championship
Winner	2024 Samoa
- * Club domestic league appearances and goals as of 6 November 2026 ‡ National team caps and goals as of 7 June 2025

Finn Hunter McKenlay (born 4 September 2005) is a New Zealand footballer who plays as a midfielder for Finn Harps in the League of Ireland First Division.

== Personal life ==
McKenaly was born in Wimbledon, London, before moving to New Zealand at the age of 2.

== Club career ==
McKenlay played youth football for East Coast Bays and Onehunga Sports before signing with Birkenhead United. On 19 June 2022, Mckenlay made his debut as a second-half substitute against Central United in the Chatham Cup. In 2023, McKenlay signed for Eastern Suburbs for the 2023 New Zealand National League Championship phase. McKenlay also played for New Zealand national under-19 schoolboys football team in 2023.

McKenlay signed for Auckland FC on 20 June 2024 for their inaugural season. On 15 December 2024, McKenlay made his A-League Men and professional debut starting in a 2–2 draw with Melbourne City.

On 4 June 2026, Auckland FC announced McKenlay's departure following the conclusion of his scholarship contract.

On 14 August 2026, McKenlay joined Finn Harps in League of Ireland First Division.

== International career ==
On 14 June 2024, McKenlay was named in the New Zealand U20 for the 2024 OFC U-19 Men's Championship. He made his debut on 6 July 2024 against New Caledonia.

McKenlay was named as part of the 21-player New Zealand U20 squad for the 2025 FIFA U-20 World Cup that took place in Chile from September to October 2025. McKenlay made three appearances in the tournament, with New Zealand exiting after the conclusion of the group stage.

== Career statistics ==
=== Club ===
As of match played on 16 October 2026

Appearances and goals by club, season and competition
Club	Season	League			Cup		Other		Total	
Club	Season	Division	Apps	Goals	Apps	Goals	Apps	Goals	Apps	Goals
Birkenhead United	2023	National League	12	2	1	0	—		13	2
Eastern Suburbs	2023	National League	4	1	0	0	—		4	1
Eastern Suburbs	2024	National League	13	0	2	1	—		15	1
Eastern Suburbs	Total		17	1	2	1	0	0	19	2
Auckland FC	2024–25	A-League Men	2	0	—		0	0	2	0
Auckland FC	2025–26	A-League Men	0	0	1	0	0	0	1	0
Auckland FC	Total		2	0	1	0	0	0	3	0
Auckland FC Reserves	2025	National League	11	3	0	0	—		11	3
Auckland FC Reserves	2026	National League	4	1	0	0	—		4	1
Auckland FC Reserves	Total		15	4	0	0	0	0	15	4
Finn Harps	2026	First Division	9	0	—		—		9	0
Career total			55	7	4	1	0	0	59	8

== Honours ==
Birkenhead United U19

- National U19 Tournament: 2023

Auckland FC

- A-League Premiership: 2024-25

New Zealand U20

- OFC U-19 Men's Championship: 2024

Individual

- College Sports Footballer of the Year: 2023
