= Marlee Francois =

Australian football player

Marlee François
Personal information
- Full name: Marlee Jean François
- Date of birth: 29 December 2002 (age 23)
- Place of birth: Sydney, Australia
- Height: 1.81 m (5 ft 11 1/2 in)
- Position: Winger

Youth career
- Camden Tigers
- 2013–2019: Fulham
- 2019–2021: Bristol City

Senior career*
Years	Team	Apps	(Gls)
2021–2024	Bristol City	0	(0)
2021	→ Bath City (loan)	4	(0)
2025–2026	Auckland FC	29	(1)

International career^{‡}
2021–2023	Australia U23	6	(1)
- * Club domestic league appearances and goals as of 16 April 2026 ‡ National team caps and goals as of 12:30 10 March 2024 (UTC)

Marlee François (French: [fʁɑ̃.swa]; born 29 December 2002) is an Australian professional footballer who plays as a winger. Most recently for A-League Men club Auckland FC.

== Early life ==
François was born and raised in Campbelltown, New South Wales, to a Mauritian father and an English Mauritian mother. His family moved to England in 2013 after he and his brother, Tyrese Francois, signed for Fulham Academy. Francois left Fulham in February 2019 to join Bristol City.

== Club career ==
=== Bristol City ===
François signed a professional contract with Bristol City in March 2021. On 20 July 2021, François scored against Bristol City in a friendly match for Portsmouth after he was granted permission to feature for the opposition due to the low numbers in Portsmouth's match squad. It was dubbed the "Shortest loan in history." The next month Francois joined Bath City F.C. on a short-term loan.

François signed a two-year contract extension with the option of a further year with Bristol City in August 2022. After 14-months sidelined with injury, Francois made his first-team debut, appearing as a substitute, in a FA Cup tie against West Brom on 28 January 2023. He was released by Bristol City at the end of the 2023–24 season.

=== Auckland FC ===
On 9 January 2025 François was unveiled as an Auckland FC player, taking shirt number 11 from the recently released Joe Champness. Having been released by Bristol City in July 2024, François was able to join up with the club ahead of the official transfer window opening on January 16. On 27 April 2025, François scored his first goal for the club directly from a corner in a 1–0 win over Perth Glory. The victory secured the Premiership for Auckland FC.

On 8 July 2026, the club announced François' departure after the expiration for his contract.

== International career ==
François is eligible to represent England, Australia or Mauritius. He made his debut for the Australian under-23 team as a substitute on 2 June 2021 against Ireland under-21s. He scored his only goal for Australia U-23s in June 2023 against Mexico U-23s. during the Maurice Revello Tournament.

== Career statistics ==
As of match played 28 February 2023

Appearances and goals by club, season and competition
Club	Season	League			National cup (Note: Includes FA Cup and Australia Cup)		League cup (Note: Includes EFL Cup)		Other		Total	
Club	Season	Division	Apps	Goals	Apps	Goals	Apps	Goals	Apps	Goals	Apps	Goals
Bristol City	2021–22	Championship	0	0	0	0	0	0	—		0	0
Bristol City	2022–23	Championship	0	0	2	0	0	0	—		2	0
Bristol City	2023–24	Championship	0	0	0	0	0	0	—		0	0
Bristol City	Total		0	0	2	0	0	0	—		2	0
Bath City (loan)	2021–22	National League South	4	0	0	0	—		0	0	4	0
Bath City (loan)	Total		4	0	0	0	0	0	—		4	0
Auckland FC	2024–25	A-League Men	14	1	—		—		2 (Note: Includes A-League Men finals series)	0	16	1
Auckland FC	2025–26	A-League Men	13	0	4	1	—		0	0	17	1
Career total			31	1	6	1	0	0	2	0	45	2

== Honours ==
Auckland FC

- A-League Premiership: 2024–25
- A-League Men Championship: 2026
