= Logan Rogerson =

New Zealand footballer (born 1998)

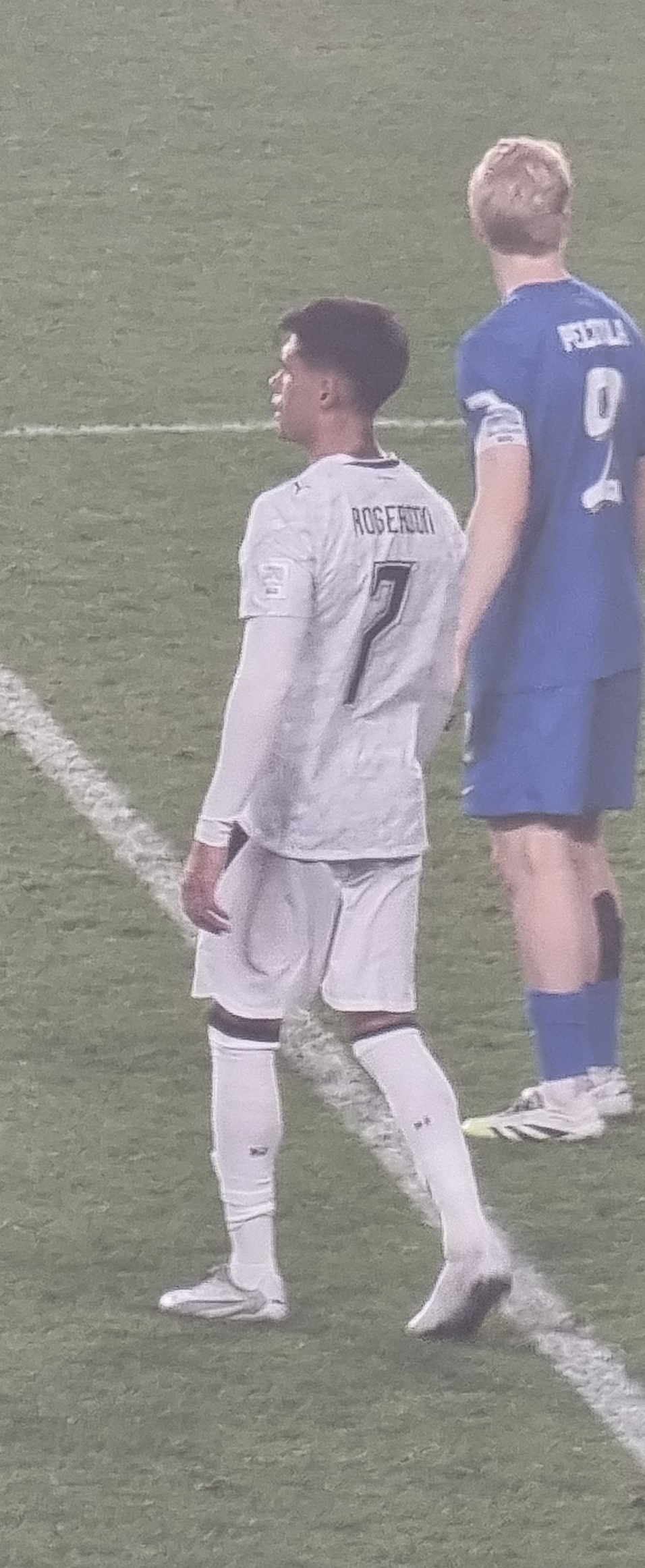
- Rogerson playing for the All Whites in March 2026.

Personal information
- Full name: Logan Tipene Rogerson
- Date of birth: 28 May 1998 (age 28)
- Place of birth: Hamilton, New Zealand
- Height: 1.82 m (6 ft 0 in)
- Position: Winger

Team information
- Current team: Auckland
- Number: 27

Youth career
- Wanderers SC
- Wellington Phoenix

Senior career*
Years	Team	Apps	(Gls)
2013–2015	Wanderers SC	3	(0)
2015–2018	Wellington Phoenix Reserves	38	(11)
2015–2018	Wellington Phoenix	11	(2)
2018–2019	Carl Zeiss Jena	2	(0)
2018–2019	Carl Zeiss Jena II	7	(1)
2019–2021	Auckland City	29	(11)
2021–2022	HJK	0	(0)
2021–2022	Klubi 04	3	(1)
2021	→ Haka (loan)	12	(1)
2022–2023	Haka	54	(6)
2024	Noah	6	(0)
2024–	Auckland FC	54	(11)

International career^{‡}
2015	New Zealand U-17	10	(11)
2016–2017	New Zealand U-20	9	(0)
2015–2021	New Zealand U-23	14	(14)
2015–	New Zealand	15	(2)
- * Club domestic league appearances and goals as of 16 May 2026 ‡ National team caps and goals as of 27 March 2025

Logan Tipene Rogerson (Māori: [ˈti.pɛ.nɛ]; born 28 May 1998) is a New Zealand professional footballer who plays as a winger for A-League club Auckland FC and the New Zealand national team.

== Career ==
Rogerson began his senior career with the now-defunct Wanderers SC in the ASB Premiership. In September 2015, he signed his first professional contract with A-League club Wellington Phoenix.

After not receiving an offer for a contract extension, Rogerson left Wellington Phoenix and signed a two-year deal with Carl Zeiss Jena in the German 3. Liga. He suffered an injury while playing for the club.

Following an injury-shortened spell in Germany, Rogerson returned to New Zealand and signed for Auckland City in October 2019. He helped the club secure a second consecutive ISPS Handa Premiership title in his first season and went on to become a key player for the side.

On 15 March 2021, after another successful season in which he scored eight goals and provided six assists, Rogerson signed with Finnish champions HJK Helsinki.

On 31 July 2024, Rogerson joined Auckland FC ahead of their inaugural A-League Men season. On 21 October 2024, he became the first Auckland FC player to score for the club, scoring the second goal in a 2–0 win over Brisbane Roar after an earlier own goal by Harry Van Der Saag. On 22 February 2025, Rogerson scored Auckland FC’s first‑ever hat-trick in a 6–1 win over Wellington Phoenix. One of the goals was initially under review after a deflection from teammate Neydar Moreno, but it was later officially credited to Rogerson by the A‑League. Rogerson finished 2024–25 season with 9 goals and 2 assists, including scoring the only goal in the first leg of Auckland FC's semi-final against Melbourne Victory. That season, he was regarded to have established himself as a regular starter while playing for the club.

On 6 July 2025, the club announced that Rogerson had signed a two-year contract extension, keeping him at Auckland FC until 2027. Rogerson's second season at Auckland FC did not replicate the attacking output of his debut campaign. He scored once in four appearances during the club's Australia Cup run, scoring in a 4–0 win over Gold Coast Knights. Rogerson failed to register a goal contribution in the opening three rounds of the 2025–26 season and was sent off in a 2–1 win over Wellington Phoenix at Sky Stadium for a high challenge, becoming the second Auckland player dismissed after Dan Hall had earlier been shown a red card.

Following his suspension, Rogerson recorded his first assist of the season, setting up Lachlan Brook for the opening goal in a 3–1 win over Wellington Phoenix at Go Media Stadium. He did not score his first A-League Men goal of the campaign until Round 19, netting in a 3–0 victory over Melbourne City on 28 February.

Rogerson scored his second league goal of the season in a 3–0 win over Adelaide United in the second leg of the semi-finals, sealing a 4–1 aggregate victory with Auckland FC's third goal in the 86th minute and sending the club to its first A-League Men Grand Final. Rogerson played the final 18 minutes of the 2026 A-League Men grand final after replacing Lachlan Brook, as Auckland FC defeated Sydney FC 1–0 to become the first New Zealand club to win the A-League Men Championship.

== International career ==
Rogerson has represented New Zealand at U17, U23, and at full senior international level. He played for the New Zealand national under-17 football team at the 2015 OFC U-17 Championship. He has captained the New Zealand national under-23 football team. He was part of the New Zealand national under-23 football team that participated in the 2015 Pacific Games, which doubled as qualification for the Football at the 2016 Summer Olympics. It was in this tournament, against New Caledonia that he scored a hat-trick in New Zealand's 5–0 win.

In November 2015 Rogerson made his full New Zealand debut came in a friendly against Oman, coming off the bench for the final 23 minutes in New Zealand's 1–0 win.

Rogerson was called up to the New Zealand squad as a late injury replacement for Matthew Garbett ahead of the 2026 FIFA World Cup. He was called up to the squad only hours before New Zealand's opening match against Iran.

== Career statistics ==
=== Club ===
As of 26 August 2026

Appearances and goals by club, season and competition
Club	Season	League			National cup (Note: Includes appearance(s) in the Australia Cup, Chatham Cup, Finnish Cup, and Armenian Cup)		League cup (Note: Includes appearances in the Finnish League Cup)		Continental		Other		Total	
Club	Season	Division	Apps	Goals	Apps	Goals	Apps	Goals	Apps	Goals	Apps	Goals	Apps	Goals
Wanderers	2014–15	NZ Premiership	3	0	—		—		—		—		3	0
Wellington Phoenix Reserves	2015–16	NZ Premiership	11	3	—		—		—		—		11	3
Wellington Phoenix Reserves	2016–17	NZ Premiership	16	3	—		—		—		—		16	3
Wellington Phoenix Reserves	2017–18	NZ Premiership	11	5	—		—		—		—		11	5
Wellington Phoenix Reserves	Total		41	11	0	0	0	0	0	0	0	0	41	11
Wellington Phoenix	2016–17	A-League	3	0	0	0	—		—		0	0	3	0
Wellington Phoenix	2017–18	A-League	7	2	1	0	0	0	0	0	—		8	2
Wellington Phoenix	Total		10	2	1	0	0	0	0	0	0	0	11	2
Carl Zeiss Jena	2018–19	3. Liga	2	0	0	0	—		—		0	0	2	0
Carl Zeiss Jena II	2018–19	NOFV-Oberliga Süd	7	1	0	0	—		—		0	0	7	1
Auckland City	2019–20	NZ Premiership	13	2	—		—		3 (Note: Appearances in OFC Champions League)	1	0	0	16	3
Auckland City	2020–21	NZ Premiership	12	8	—		—		0	0	1	0	13	8
Auckland City	Total		25	10	0	0	0	0	3	1	1	0	29	11
HJK Helsinki	2021	Veikkausliiga	0	0	0	0	0	0	0	0	–		0	0
Klubi 04	2021	Ykkönen	3	1	—		—		—		–		3	1
Haka (loan)	2021	Veikkausliiga	12	1	0	0	0	0	–		–		12	1
Haka	2022	Veikkausliiga	27	4	3	2	4	0	–		2	0	36	6
Haka	2023	Veikkausliiga	25	2	1	0	4	1	2 (Note: Appearances in UEFA Conference League)	1	–		32	4
Haka	Total		52	6	4	2	8	1	2	1	2	0	68	10
Noah	2023–24	Armenian Premier League	6	0	1	0	–		–		–		7	0
Auckland FC	2024–25	A-League Men	26	8	–		–		–		2 (Note: Appearances in A-League Finals)	1	28	9
Auckland FC	2025–26	A-League Men	24	1	4	1	–		–		4	1	32	3
Auckland FC	2026–27	A-League Men	0	0	–		–		1 (Note: Appearance in FIFA Intercontinental Cup)	0	0	0	1	0
Auckland FC	Total		50	9	4	1	0	0	1	0	6	2	62	12
Career total			196	36	10	3	8	1	6	2	3	0	231	47

=== International goals ===
List of international goals scored by Logan Rogerson
No.	Date	Venue	Opponent	Score	Result	Competition
1.	24 March 2022	Suheim bin Hamad Stadium, Doha, Qatar	New Caledonia	2–1	7–1	2022 FIFA World Cup qualification
2.	14 October 2024	North Harbour Stadium, Auckland, New Zealand	Malaysia	4–0	4–0	Friendly

== Honours ==
Auckland FC

- A-League Premiership: 2024–25
- A-League Men Championship: 2026

New Zealand

- OFC Nations Cup: 2016
- Pacific Games: 2019
- OFC U-20 Championship: 2016
- OFC U-17 Championship: 2015

Individual

- OFC U-17 Championship Golden Ball: 2015
