= Dan Hall (soccer) =

Australian soccer player

Daniel Hall
Personal information
- Full name: Daniel Lotu Hall
- Date of birth: 14 June 1999 (age 27)
- Height: 1.84 m (6 ft 0 in)
- Position: Central defender

Team information
- Current team: JEF United Chiba
- Number: 66

Youth career
- Ra Sports and Social Club
- Queensland Lions
- Brisbane City
- 2014: Queensland Lions
- 2015–2018: Western Pride

Senior career*
Years	Team	Apps	(Gls)
2018	Western Pride	9	(1)
2019–2021	CCM Academy	30	(2)
2020–2024	Central Coast Mariners	74	(3)
2024–2026	Auckland FC	44	(0)
2026–	JEF United Chiba	7	(0)
- * Club domestic league appearances and goals as of 18 September 2026

Daniel Lotu Hall (Fijian: [lo.tu]; born 14 June 1999) is an Australian professional soccer player who plays as a defender for J1 League side JEF United Chiba.

== Club career ==
=== Western Pride ===
Hall made his senior club debut for Western Pride in 2017, scoring his first senior goal against South West Queensland Thunder. He came on as a substitute late in the 2017 NPL Queensland Grand Final, and was fouled, allowing Dylan Wenzel-Halls to score the winning goal from the resultant free-kick.

=== Central Coast Mariners ===
In November 2020, A-League side Central Coast Mariners signed Hall to a senior contract after Hall had previously captained Central Coast Mariners Academy. Hall signed a two-year contract extension with the Mariners in June 2021.

Hall was part of the 2022–23 A-League Championship winning team for the Mariners.

The 2023–24 season turned out to be another successful season, as Hall was part of the Mariners' Championship, Premiership and AFC Cup winning 2023–24 season. This turned out to be Hall's final season with the club, departing at the end of the campaign.

=== Auckland FC ===
On 2 July 2024, Hall signed a two-year contract with new A-League club Auckland FC. Hall made his Auckland FC debut in the club’s first ever A-League match on 19 October 2024, a 2–0 win over Brisbane Roar. On 17 December, it was reported that Hall had broken his ankle during training, keeping him sidelined for 10–12 weeks. He returned from injury on 16 March 2025 in a 2–2 draw against his former club, Central Coast Mariners, playing the full 90 minutes and earning the Player of the Match award. He finished the season winning his second successive Premiership with Auckland in their inaugural season, making 15 appearances throughout the 2024–25 season.

On November 8 2025, Hall received his first red card for the club in the fourth edition of the New Zealand Derby, being sent off in the 49th minute for a foul on Corban Piper. Logan Rogerson was later sent off in the 79th minute, Auckland would go on to win 2–1. The pair would later win an award for the A-League Moment of the Season during the club's 2025–26 award ceremony.

On 7 February 2026, Hall made his 100th A-League appearance, playing the full 90 minutes in a 1–0 win against Sydney FC. Hall played the full 120 minutes in Auckland FC's elimination final against Melbourne City before the match was decided by penalties. After the opening six penalties were converted, Michael Woud saved Nathaniel Atkinson's penalty, Hall would score the decisive penalty and send Auckland FC through to the semi-finals.

Hall's final game came for the club on 23 May in the 2026 A-League Men Grand Final, he played the full 90 minutes as Auckland won the Championship 1–0 over Sydney FC.

The club announced his departure on 15 June so he could explore overseas options. He made 48 appearances over two seasons for Auckland in all competitors.

=== JEF United Chiba ===
On 26 June 2026, J1 League side JEF United Chiba announced that they had signed Hall.

== International career ==
Hall is eligible to represent both Australia and Fiji. As of 2026, Hall has yet to be called up to either national teams.

== Honours ==
Central Coast Mariners

- A-League Championship: 2022–23, 2023–24
- A-League Premiership: 2023–24
- AFC Cup: 2023–24

Auckland FC

- A-League Premiership: 2024–25
- A-League Men Championship: 2026
