= Alex Paulsen =

New Zealand association football player

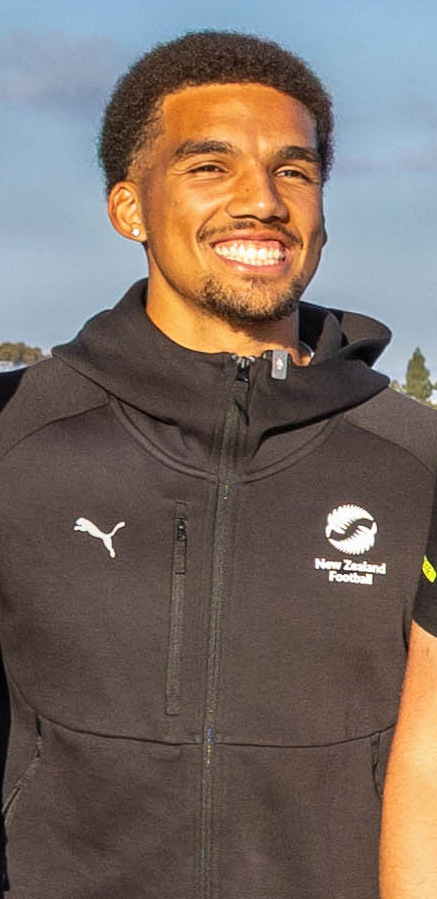
- Paulsen in 2026

Personal information
- Full name: Alexander Noah Paulsen
- Date of birth: 4 July 2002 (age 24)
- Place of birth: Auckland, New Zealand
- Height: 1.84 m (6 ft 0 in)
- Position: Goalkeeper

Team information
- Current team: Motherwell (on loan from Bournemouth)
- Number: 1

Youth career
- –2017: Eastern Suburbs & Onehunga Sports
- 2018: Wellington Phoenix

Senior career*
Years	Team	Apps	(Gls)
2018–2023	Wellington Phoenix Reserves	21	(0)
2018	→ Wellington United (loan)	2	(0)
2019–2021	→ Lower Hutt City (loan)	39	(0)
2021–2024	Wellington Phoenix	33	(0)
2024–	Bournemouth	0	(0)
2024–2025	→ Auckland FC (loan)	28	(0)
2025–2026	→ Lechia Gdańsk (loan)	24	(0)
2026–	→ Motherwell (loan)	10	(0)

International career^{‡}
2018–2019	New Zealand U17	8	(0)
2019–2025	New Zealand U23	5	(0)
2024–	New Zealand	8	(0)
Medal record
Men's football
Representing New Zealand
OFC Nations Cup
Winner	2024 Fiji/Vanuatu
OFC U-16 Championship
Winner	2018 Tonga/Solomon Islands
- * Club domestic league appearances and goals as of 29 October 2026 (UTC) ‡ National team caps and goals as of 08:40, 7 June 2026 (UTC)

Alexander Noah Paulsen (born 4 July 2002) is a New Zealand professional footballer who plays as a keeper for Scottish Premiership club Motherwell, on loan from English Premier League club Bournemouth, and the New Zealand national team.

Born in Auckland, Paulsen joined the academy of Wellington Phoenic FC in 2018 and signed his first professional contract in September 2021. After establishing himself as the club’s first-choice goalkeeper, he signed for Bournemouth in June 2024. He was subsequently loaned to sister club Auckland FC for their inaugural A-League Men season and won the Premiership with them, before joining Lechia Gdańsk on loan for the 2025–26 campaign. In July 2026, Paulsen was loaned to Scottish side Motherwell. Paulsen represented New Zealand at the 2020 and 2024 Olympics. He also featured in the New Zealand squad at the 2026 FIFA World Cup.

== Early life ==
Paulsen was born in Auckland to a South African father and Namibian mother. He played futsal throughout his childhood, and only committed to playing football as a goalkeeper at the age of 13 after beginning as an outfielder. Paulsen initially played in the youth ranks of Eastern Suburbs and then Onehunga Sports under the tutelage of noted youth development coach Hiroshi Miyazawa. In 2018, aged 15, Paulsen moved to Wellington to join the Wellington Phoenix academy through their affiliation with Onehunga Sports, following in the footsteps of fellow graduates Sarpreet Singh and Max Mata.

== Club career ==
=== Wellington Phoenix ===
==== Early career ====
After progressing through the Wellington Phoenix age-grade sides, Paulsen was regularly named as a substitute for Wellington Phoenix Reserves throughout the 2018–19 and 2019–20 New Zealand Football Championship seasons, but did not make an appearance. During this time, Paulsen played for Wellington Phoenix affiliate clubs Wellington United and Lower Hutt City in the Central League. On 14 November 2020, Paulsen finally made his reserves debut, starting in a 1–0 loss to Team Wellington in the opening game of the 2020–21 season. Paulsen remained a consistent starter throughout the season, and despite the team finishing last, Paulsen was named the league's Most Valuable Player. His performances for the reserves culminated in his first professional contract, signing for the senior team on a three-year deal alongside fellow reserve standout Ben Old.

Paulsen entered the 2021–22 A-League Men season as second-choice goalkeeper behind club captain Oliver Sail. On 19 December 2021, following an injury to Sail, Paulsen made his A-League debut as a substitute in a 2–1 loss against Sydney FC. Paulsen would remain starter in Sail's absence; in an FFA Cup quarterfinal match against Melbourne City on 5 January 2022, Paulsen made three saves in a 0–0 (4–3) penalty shootout extra time win to secure the Phoenix's maiden semifinal appearance in the competition. Upon Sail's return from injury, however, Paulsen returned to a bench role, and he did not make an appearance the following season.

==== Breakout season ====
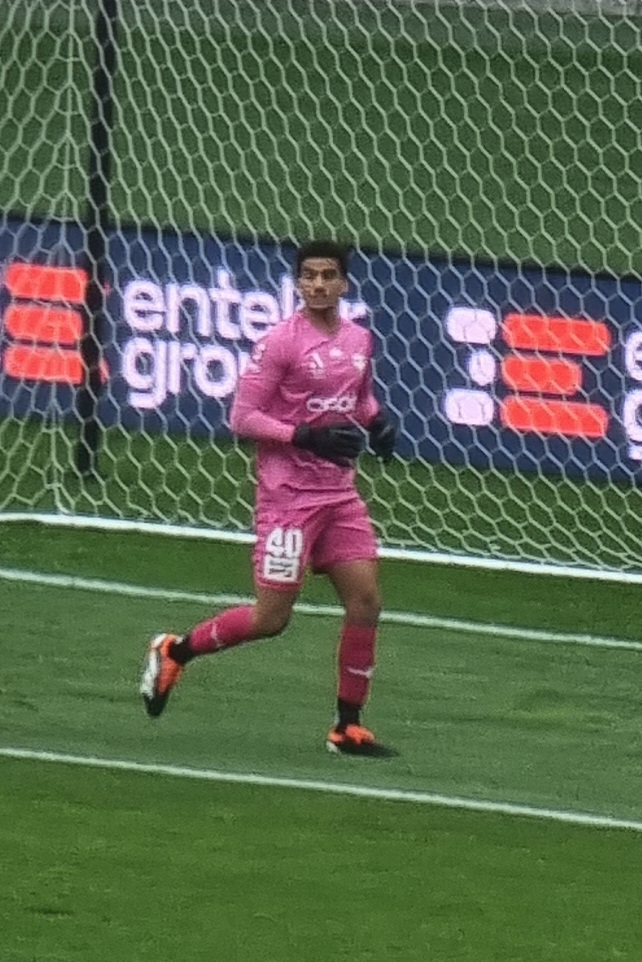
Paulsen playing for the Phoenix in 2024

Sail departed the club to sign with Perth Glory prior to the start of the 2023–24 season. Paulsen became starting goalkeeper under new head coach Giancarlo Italiano, and played every minute as the Wellington Phoenix finished second, achieving their highest ever finish while conceding the lowest number of goals in club history. Paulsen was named the Wellington Phoenix Members' Player of the Year, Players' Player of the Year and Under–23 Player of the Year. He was named A-League Men Goalkeeper of the Year, and shared the Young Footballer of the Year award with Nestory Irankunda; this marked the first ever time a Wellington Phoenix player had won the award. He was also named in the A-League Men Team of the Season, receiving the most votes out of any player. Paulsen's season has since been noted as among the best of any A-League goalkeeper in history.

On 20 May 2024, Paulsen was called up to the A-League All Stars for a friendly match against Newcastle United; Paulsen started the match as the All Stars won 8–0.

Paulsen left the Phoenix having made 37 first-team appearances, keeping a club-record 11 clean sheets in 27 league matches during the 2023–24 season. He also saved three penalties, denying Adam Taggart, Jamie Maclaren, and Ulises Dávila from the spot. His departure represented a club-record transfer fee, surpassing the previous record set by Sarpreet Singh to Bayern Munich in 2019.

=== Bournemouth ===
In June 2024, Paulsen signed for Premier League club Bournemouth for a reported initial fee of £850,000, rising to £2 million with add-ons, on a four-year contract running until the end of the 2027–28 season.

==== Auckland FC (loan) ====
Ahead of the 2024–25 A-League Men season, the Australian Professional Leagues, the governing body for the A-League Men, announced the removal of the Caceres rule; this allowed Paulsen to be loaned to sister club Auckland FC.

Paulsen was part of an Auckland side that set a new Australian football record by going 532 minutes before conceding their first goal, including a 2–0 win over his former club Wellington Phoenix in the first-ever New Zealand Derby. Paulsen played every minute as Auckland won the A-League Premiership in their debut season, marking his first major honour at club level. He was named the A-League Men Goalkeeper of the Year for a second consecutive season and was also included in the Professional Footballers Australia (PFA) A-League Team of the Season, alongside teammates Hiroki Sakai, Francis de Vries, and Louis Verstraete.

Paulsen returned to AFC Bournemouth on 12 June 2025, making 28 appearances and keeping 13 clean sheets during his loan spell.

==== Lechia Gdańsk (loan) ====
On 26 August 2025, Bournemouth loaned Paulsen to Lechia Gdańsk of the Polish Ekstraklasa for the 2025–26 season.

Paulsen made his first appearance for the club in a 2–0 loss to Jagiellonia Białystok. Two weeks later, he kept his first clean sheet in his second appearance, a 2–0 win over GKS Katowice on 12 September. On 23 June 2026, in the wake of Lechia's relegation to the second tier, it was announced Paulsen's loan had ended.

==== Motherwell (loan) ====
On 13 July 2026, Paulsen moved to Scottish Premiership side Motherwell on loan for the 2026–27 season. On 23 July, Paulsen made his debut for the club, keeping a clean sheet in a 2–0 victory over HB Tórshavn in the first leg of the UEFA Conference League second qualifying round. Paulsen made his league debut on 2 August 2026 in the opening round of the Scottish Premiership, as his side defeated Hibernian 2–1 at Easter Road.

== International career ==
In September 2018, Paulsen was called up for New Zealand to compete in the 2018 OFC U-16 Championship. Paulsen made three competition appearances, and was presented the Golden Glove award. In the final against the Solomon Islands, Paulsen saved two penalties – one in regular time, one in the penalty shootout – as New Zealand prevailed to win their eighth title, qualifying for the 2019 FIFA U-17 World Cup in the process.

Paulsen played in all three of New Zealand's games in the 2019 FIFA U-17 World Cup, being eliminated in the group stage. Despite making a high-profile error in a 3–0 loss to Brazil, Paulsen recovered to keep a clean sheet in a 1–0 win over Canada.

Aged just 17, Paulsen was called up by Des Buckingham to the New Zealand under-23 squad for the 2019 OFC Men's Olympic Qualifying Tournament. Paulsen made one appearance, as a late substitute in a 6–1 win over Samoa, as New Zealand won the title and qualified for the 2020 Summer Olympics. Danny Hay named Paulsen as a traveling reserve for the tournament, with Michael Woud and Jamie Searle preferred in the main squad; Paulsen did not make an appearance as New Zealand reached the quarter-finals.

In September 2022, Paulsen was first called up to the senior national team for a two-game friendly series against Australia, but did not play in either match. He was later called up for friendlies against Greece and Ireland in November 2023, and then in March 2024 for two FIFA Series matches against Egypt and Tunisia, but again did not play ahead of incumbent Max Crocombe.

On 18 June 2024, Paulsen finally made his senior international debut, keeping a clean sheet against the Solomon Islands in a 3−0 2024 OFC Men's Nations Cup win. Crocombe started all subsequent tournament games as New Zealand eventually claimed the trophy.

Paulsen was recalled to the All Whites for the inaugural New Zealand FIFA Series, featuring matches against Finland and Chile. He played the full 90 minutes against Chile in a 4–1 victory, which marked New Zealand's first win against a CONMEBOL opponent and ended their eight-game winless run.

On 14 May 2026, he was named in the 26-man squad for the 2026 FIFA World Cup.

== Personal life ==
Paulsen attended St Heliers School and Selwyn College in Auckland, before moving to Scots College in Wellington after joining the Wellington Phoenix academy in 2018.

Paulsen's brother, Adam, represents the New Zealand national futsal team. The brothers played futsal regularly growing up, and Paulsen attributes this as a major influence on his ball-playing ability as a goalkeeper.

== Career statistics ==
=== Club ===
As of match played 13 August 2026

Appearances and goals by club, season and competition
Club	Season	League			National cup (Note: Includes Australia Cup, Polish Cup, Scottish Cup)		League cup		Other		Total	
Club	Season	Division	Apps	Goals	Apps	Goals	Apps	Goals	Apps	Goals	Apps	Goals
Wellington Phoenix Reserves	2018–19	NZ Premiership	0	0	—		—		—		0	0
Wellington Phoenix Reserves	2019–20	NZ Premiership	0	0	—		—		—		0	0
Wellington Phoenix Reserves	2020–21	NZ Premiership	13	0	—		—		—		13	0
Wellington Phoenix Reserves	2022	National League	3	0	—		—		—		3	0
Wellington Phoenix Reserves	2023	National League	5	0	—		—		—		5	0
Wellington Phoenix Reserves	Total		21	0	—		—		—		21	0
Wellington United	2018	Central League	2	0	—		—		—		2	0
Lower Hutt City	2019	Central League	12	0	—		—		—		12	0
Lower Hutt City	2020	Central League	17	0	—		—		—		17	0
Lower Hutt City	2021	Central League	10	0	1	0	—		—		11	0
Lower Hutt City	Total		39	0	1	0	—		—		40	0
Wellington Phoenix	2021–22	A-League Men	4	0	2	0	—		—		6	0
Wellington Phoenix	2022–23	A-League Men	0	0	0	0	—		—		0	0
Wellington Phoenix	2023–24	A-League Men	27	0	2	0	—		2 (Note: Appearances in A-League Men finals series)	0	31	0
Wellington Phoenix	Total		31	0	4	0	—		2	0	37	0
Bournemouth	2024–25	Premier League	0	0	0	0	0	0	—		0	0
Auckland FC (loan)	2024–25	A-League Men	26	0	—		—		2	0	28	0
Lechia Gdańsk (loan)	2025–26	Ekstraklasa	24	0	3	0	—		—		27	0
Motherwell (loan)	2026–27	Scottish Premiership	2	0	0	0	0	0	4 (Note: Appearances in UEFA Conference League)	0	6	0
Career total			145	0	8	0	0	0	8	0	161	0

=== International ===
As of match played 6 June 2026

Appearances and goals by national team and year
National team	Year	Apps	Goals
New Zealand
New Zealand	2024	3	0
New Zealand	2025	2	0
New Zealand	2026	3	0
Total		8	0

== Honours ==
Auckland FC

- A-League Premiership: 2024–25

New Zealand

- OFC U-16 Championship: 2018
- OFC Nations Cup: 2024

Individual

- A-League Men Player of the Month: October/November 2023, March 2024
- PFA A-League Team of the Season: 2023–24, 2024–25
- Harry Kewell Medal: 2023–24
- A-League Goalkeeper of the Year: 2023–24, 2024–25
- A-Leagues All Stars: 2024
