= Adama Coulibaly (footballer, born 2005) =

New Zealand footballer (born 2005)

Personal information
- Full name: Adama Mahamadou Gemmell-Coulibaly
- Date of birth: 20 January 2005 (age 21)
- Place of birth: Auckland, New Zealand
- Position: Midfielder

Youth career
- –2020: Western Springs

Senior career*
Years	Team	Apps	(Gls)
2021–2024	Western Springs	57	(5)
2024–2026	Auckland FC	2	(0)
2025–2026	Auckland FC Reserves	20	(0)
2026	Auckland FC (OFC)	5	(0)
2026–	Auckland United	0	(0)

International career^{‡}
2024–	New Zealand U20	5	(0)
Medal record
Men's football
Representing New Zealand
OFC U-19 Championship
Winner	2024 Samoa
- * Club domestic league appearances and goals as of 6 February 2026 ‡ National team caps and goals as of 9 October 2025

Adama Mahamadou Gemmell-Coulibaly (Bambara: ߊߘߊߡߊ ߞߎߟߌߓߊߟߌ, pronounced [à.dà.má kù.lì.bá.lí]; born 20 January 2005) is a New Zealand footballer who plays as a midfielder or defender for National League club Auckland United.

== Club career ==
=== Auckland FC ===
On 20 June 2024, Coulibaly signed for Auckland FC as one of the club's first six scholarship players ahead of their inaugural season.

Coulibaly made his debut in a 1–0 defeat to Perth Glory. During the match, he was shown a red card in the 93rd minute after tripping Joel Anasmo, denying a goalscoring opportunity and marking the first red card in the club's history.

In his second season at the club, Coulibaly was made available for Auckland FC's OFC Professional League squad in their inaugural campaign. Coulibaly made his OFC debut on 12 April 2026 in a 3–2 victory over South Melbourne as an 87th minute substitute.

On 4 June 2026, Auckland FC announced Coulibaly's departure following the conclusion of his scholarship contract.

=== Auckland United ===
On 20 June 2026, Coulibaly was first revealed as a substitute for Auckland United's Northern League fixture against Eastern Suburbs.

== International career ==
Born in New Zealand, Coulibaly is of Malian descent and holds dual-citizenship. On 14 June 2024, Coulibaly was named in the New Zealand U20 for the 2024 OFC U-19 Men's Championship. He made his debut on 6 July 2024 against New Caledonia.

Coulibaly was named as part of the 21-player New Zealand U20 squad for the 2025 FIFA U-20 World Cup that took place in Chile from September to October 2025. Coulibaly made one appearance in the tournament, with New Zealand exiting after the conclusion of the group stage.

== Honours ==
Auckland FC

- A-League Premiership: 2024–25
