= Neyder Moreno =

Colombian footballer (born 1997)

Personal information
- Full name: Neyder Stiven Moreno Betancur
- Date of birth: 9 February 1997 (age 29)
- Place of birth: Medellín, Colombia
- Height: 1.74 m (5 ft 9 in)
- Positions: Attacking midfielder; winger

Team information
- Current team: Banfield
- Number: 33

Senior career*
| Years | Team | Apps | (Gls) |
| 2017–2018 | Envigado | 65 | (13) |
| 2019–2024 | Atlético Nacional | 32 | (3) |
| 2020 | → Envigado (loan) | 12 | (5) |
| 2021–2023 | → Santa Fe (loan) | 65 | (7) |
| 2024–2025 | Auckland FC | 24 | (8) |
| 2025–2026 | Atlético Bucaramanga | 17 | (2) |
| 2026– | Banfield | 9 | (1) |
- * Club domestic league appearances and goals as of 17:00, 11 August 2026 (UTC)

Neyder Stiven Moreno Betancur (born 9 February 1997) is a Colombian footballer who plays as an attacking midfielder for Banfield

== Life and career ==
Moreno was born on 9 February 1997 in Medellín, Colombia. He is a native of Medellín, Colombia. He attended Institución Universitaria Pascual Bravo in Colombia. He studied engineering. He has a daughter. He has regarded Portugal international Cristiano Ronaldo as his football idol. He mainly operates as a midfielder. He specifically operates as an attacking midfielder. He can also operate as a left-winger or as a right-winger. He is right-footed. He is known for his passing ability. He is also known for his speed.

Moreno started his career with Colombian side Envigado. In 2019, he signed for Colombian side Atlético Nacional. He was described as "one of the best players in the current Atlético Nacional squad" while playing for the club in 2023. He helped them win the 2023 Copa Colombia. In 2020, he returned to Colombian side Envigado on loan. In 2021, he was sent on loan to Colombian side Santa Fe. He helped the club win the league. In 2024, he signed for New Zealand side Auckland FC.

== Honours ==
Auckland FC

- A-League Premiership: 2024-25
