= A-League Men finals series =

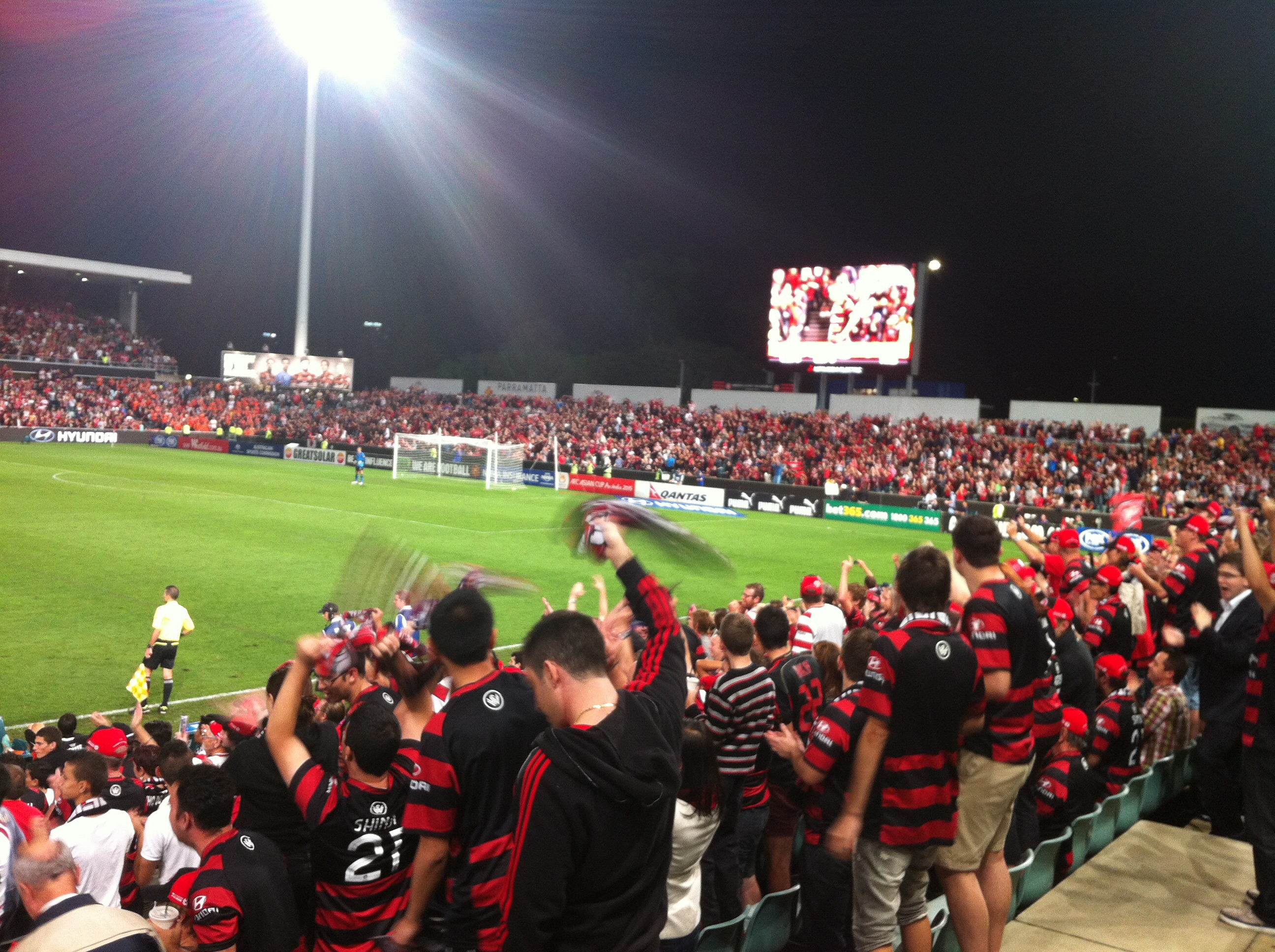
Western Sydney Wanderers supporters during a semi-final match against Brisbane Roar in 2013

The A-League Men finals series is a playoff tournament held at the end of each A-League Men season to determine the champion. The top six teams qualify for the finals based on the home-and-away season results, culminating in the A-League Men Grand Final.

== Inception ==
Finals series began back in the National Soccer League era from the 1984 season onwards, and has been consistently played (except the 1987 season) in every Australian national league season to date. With the A-League Men starting with eight teams, top four play-offs were used for the first three seasons, before changing to top six play-offs as more clubs entered the competition.

=== Systems ===
The A-League Men has used four different finals tournament systems in its history:

- 2006–2009 (top four) – Page playoff system
- 2010–2012 (top six) – Top-six play-offs (four weeks, double chance)
- 2013–2021 (top six) – Top-six play-offs (three weeks, no double chance)
- 2022–present (top six) – Top-six play-offs (four weeks, no double chance)

== History ==
The first edition of the A-League Men finals series was played at the culmination of the 2005–06 A-League season, beginning with the top four teams from the league ladder qualifying using a modified Page playoff system, with the difference that each first-round game would be played over two legs starting with the modified Page playoff system. Sydney FC claimed the first A-League Men championship, by defeating the Central Coast Mariners 1–0 in the Grand Final, despite Adelaide United winning the premiership prior.

The same playoff systems were used the next few editions from 2007 to 2009. After four straight years the finals series adapted a new modified system for top-six play-offs in 2010, with the amount of finals teams being increased from four to six; meaning the introduction of the elimination-finals for the lower finishing finals teams. Even so, it was uncommon for elimination finals teams to reach the Grand Final for most editions with this playoffs system. Perth Glory were the first to reach the Grand Final from starting at the elimination-finals in 2012.

A new top-six playoffs system was introduced and has been used ever since 2013, where a three-week series was used instead of four and the top two teams no longer receive a double chance. Instead they received the opening week of the finals series off and only needed to win one game to make the Grand Final. Around this time, Melbourne Victory, Sydney FC and Brisbane Roar had been hosting grand finals ever since the first season of the A-League as the most efficient performers in the finals series. Since this current playoffs system was introduced, semi-final starting teams were common in being the only teams to qualify for the Grand Final until 2018, where Melbourne Victory played in the 2018 A-League Grand Final after qualifying from fourth place spot and the elimination-finals. Western United are the only other team to play in a Grand Final starting from the elimination-finals in 2022, since this current playoffs system. Since the 2021–22 season a two-legged semi final rule was introduced.

== Venues ==
Finals matches are played in the state of the home team, giving a home state advantage to the higher placed team; the exceptions of this rule occurred in the 2020 finals series, where all matches were played at Western Sydney Stadium in Parramatta, due to the COVID-19 pandemic in Australia.

The 2023 A-League Men Grand Final involved the grand final being played at a neutral venue, following an APL decision to host 2023, 2024 and 2025 Grand Finals in Sydney in a deal with Destination NSW, a move which received considerable backlash in December 2022 and scrapped in October 2023.

== Appearances by club ==
Bold indicates they won the finals series that year. Team names in italics indicates the club is a former A-League Men member. Year in italics indicates winner of finals series is yet to be determined.

Rank	Club	Appearances	Years
1	Sydney FC	15	**2006**, 2007, 2008, **2010**, 2012, 2014, 2015, **2017**, 2018, **2019**, **2020**, 2021, 2023, 2024, 2026
1	Melbourne Victory	15	**2007**, **2009**, 2010, 2011, 2013, 2014, **2015**, 2016, 2017, **2018**, 2019, 2022, 2024, 2025, 2026
1	Adelaide United	15	2006, 2007, 2009, 2011, 2013, 2014, 2015, **2016**, 2018, 2019, 2021, 2022, 2023, 2025, 2026
4	Melbourne Heart/City	13	2012, 2015, 2016, 2017, 2018, 2019, 2020, **2021**, 2022, 2023, 2024, **2025**, 2026
5	Queensland/Brisbane Roar	12	2008, 2009, **2011**, **2012**, 2013, **2014**, 2015, 2016, 2017, 2018, 2020, 2021
6	Central Coast Mariners	11	2006, 2008, 2009, 2011, 2012, **2013**, 2014, 2021, 2022, **2023**, **2024**
7	Wellington Phoenix	9	2010, 2011, 2012, 2015, 2019, 2020, 2022, 2023, 2024
8	Perth Glory	7	2010, 2012, 2013, 2016, 2017, 2019, 2020
9	Newcastle Jets	5	2006, 2007, **2008**, 2010, 2018, 2026
9	Western Sydney Wanderers	5	2013, 2014, 2016, 2017, 2023, 2025
11	Western United	3	2020, **2022**, 2025
12	Gold Coast United	2	2010, 2011
12	Macarthur FC	2	2021, 2024
12	Auckland FC	2	2025, **2026**
