= List of Auckland FC players =

Auckland Football Club, an association football club based in Freemans Bay, Auckland, was founded in 2024 and became the second New Zealand member admitted into the Australian A-League Men. All players who have played in at least one match are listed below.

== Key ==
- The list is ordered first by date of debut, and then if necessary in alphabetical order.
- Appearances as a substitute are included.

Positions key
GK	Goalkeeper
DF	Defender
MF	Midfielder
FW	Forward

Nationality
Unless otherwise noted, the nationality of a player is determined by the country/countries which he has played for, or if said person has not played international football, their country of birth.
Position
Playing positions are listed according to the tactical formations that were employed at the time.
Club career
Club career is defined as the first and last calendar years in which the player appeared for the club in any of the competitions listed below.
Total appearances and Total goals
Total appearances and goals comprise those in the A-League Men, A-League Men finals series, Australia Cup and FIFA Intercontinental Cup.

== Players ==
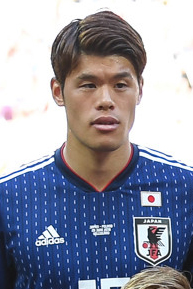
Japan national team defender Hiroki Sakai captained Auckland FC in their competitive debut in October 2024.

Players highlighted in bold are still actively playing at Auckland FC.

Statistics are correct up to and including the match played on 21 November 2026.

List of Auckland FC players
Player	Nationality	Pos	Club career	Starts	Subs	Total	Goals	Ref.
Player	Nationality	Pos	Club career	Appearances			Goals	Ref.
**Jake Brimmer**	Malta	MF	2024–	33	17	50	3	
**Francis de Vries**	New Zealand	DF	2024–	60	3	63	3	
**Felipe Gallegos**	Chile	MF	2024–	52	9	61	2	
Liam Gillion	New Zealand	FW	2024–2026	11	16	27	1	
Dan Hall	Fiji	DF	2024–2026	48	0	48	0	
**Cameron Howieson**	New Zealand	MF	2024–	17	33	50	1	
Max Mata	New Zealand	FW	2024–2025	11	8	19	2	
Guillermo May	Uruguay	FW	2024–2026	47	11	58	16	
Alex Paulsen	New Zealand	GK	2024–2025	28	0	28	0	
**Nando Pijnaker**	New Zealand	DF	2024–	46	5	51	4	
Jesse Randall	New Zealand	FW	2024–2026	41	13	54	15	
**Logan Rogerson**	New Zealand	FW	2024–	48	18	66	12	
**Hiroki Sakai**	Japan	DF	2024–	53	4	57	4	
Tommy Smith	New Zealand	DF	2024–2025	10	13	23	0	
Louis Verstraete	Belgium	MF	2024–2026	47	8	55	4	
Neyder Moreno	Colombia	FW	2024–2025	10	14	24	8	
Luis Toomey	New Zealand	MF	2024–2025	0	8	8	0	
Scott Galloway	Australia	DF	2024–2025	0	4	4	0	
**Callan Elliot**	New Zealand	DF	2024–	30	27	57	1	
Finn McKenlay	New Zealand	MF	2024–2026	1	2	3	0	
Adama Coulibaly	New Zealand	DF	2025–2026	0	2	2	0	
Marlee Francois	Australia	FW	2025–	15	18	33	2	
**Jonty Bidois**	New Zealand	FW	2025–	1	14	15	0	
**Oliver Middleton**	New Zealand	MF	2025–	0	3	3	0	
**Michael Woud**	New Zealand	GK	2025–	37	1	38	0	
**Lachlan Brook**	Australia	FW	2025–	30	9	39	11	
**Luka Vicelich**	New Zealand	DF	2025–	3	6	9	1	
**Sam Cosgrove**	England	FW	2025–	30	5	35	12	
Jake Girdwood-Reich	Australia	DF	2025–	25	4	29	2	
**Oliver Sail**	New Zealand	GK	2026–	1	0	1	0	
**James Mitchell**	New Zealand	MF	2026–	0	2	2	0	
Bailey Ferguson	Australia	FW	2026	0	2	2	0	
Ryan Mackay	New Zealand	DF	2026	0	1	1	0	
**Van Fitzharris**	New Zealand	FW	2026–	0	8	8	0	
James Hilton	Australia	GK	2026	2	0	2	0	
**Lachlan Bayliss**	New Zealand	MF	2026–	6	0	6	3	
**Aaron Calver**	Australia	DF	2026–	1	0	1	0	
**Daniel Normann**	Norway	MF	2026–	3	3	6	0	
**Ronan Wynne**	New Zealand	DF	2026–	3	1	4	0	
**Isa Prins**	New Zealand	FW	2026–	0	3	3	0	

== Captains ==
Hiroki Sakai is the inaugural and current captain for Auckland FC.

Dates	Captain
2024–	(Japan) Hiroki Sakai
