= 2026–27 Auckland FC season =

Auckland FC
2026–27 season
- Owner: Black Knight Football and Entertainment
- Chairman: Bill Foley
- Head Coach: Pedro Moreira
- Stadium: Mount Smart Stadium
- A-League Men: 7th
- FIFA Intercontinental Cup: First round
- Top goalscorer: League: Lachlan Bayliss (3 goals); All: Lachlan Bayliss (3 goals)
- Highest home attendance: 20,635 vs. Melbourne City (17 October 2026); A-League Men
- Lowest home attendance: 10,093 vs. Melbourne Victory (22 November 2026); A-League Men
- Average home league attendance: 16,402
- Biggest win: 3–1 vs. Melbourne City (H) (17 October 2026); A-League Men
- Biggest defeat: 2–5 vs. Western Sydney Wanderers (A) (24 October 2026); A-League Men
Home colours	Away colours
- All statistics correct as of 22 November 2026.

The 2026–27 Auckland Football Club season is Auckland FC's third season in the A-League Men, the top flight of Australian soccer. The club also competed in the FIFA Intercontinental Cup for the first time, and will field a separate team in the OFC Professional League for the second time. The season covered the period from 1 July 2026 until 30 June 2027.

Auckland FC before kick-off during their first home match of the 2026–27 season Melbourne City at Go Media Stadium

In January 2026, it was confirmed that the club and fellow New Zealand side Wellington Phoenix would no longer participate in the Australia Cup from the 2026 edition onwards.

== Players ==
Note: Flags indicate national team as defined under FIFA eligibility rules; some limited exceptions apply. Players may hold more than one non-FIFA nationality.

No.	Pos.	Nation	Player
1	GK	NZL	Michael Woud
2	DF	JPN	Hiroki Sakai (captain)
4	DF	NZL	Nando Pijnaker
7	MF	NZL	Cameron Howieson
8	MF	CHI	Felipe Gallegos
9	FW	ENG	Sam Cosgrove
10	MF	NZL	Lachlan Bayliss
15	DF	NZL	Francis de Vries
16	MF	NOR	Daniel Normann
17	DF	NZL	Callan Elliot
18	MF	NZL	Marley Leuluai (scholarship)
19	MF	NZL	Oliver Middleton
20	GK	NZL	Oliver Sail

No.	Pos.	Nation	Player
21	FW	NZL	Isa Prins (scholarship)
22	MF	MLT	Jake Brimmer (vice-captain)
23	DF	NZL	Ronan Wynne
24	FW	NZL	Aaron Cartwright (scholarship)
25	DF	NZL	Luka Vicelich (scholarship)
27	FW	NZL	Logan Rogerson
28	DF	AUS	Aaron Calver
30	GK	NZL	Joseph Knowles (scholarship)
35	FW	NZL	Jonty Bidois
57	FW	NZL	Van Fitzharris (scholarship)
77	FW	AUS	Lachlan Brook

== Transfers ==
Note: Transfers' in/out date may refer to the date of announcement and not the date of signing from the mentioned players.

=== Transfers in ===
No.	Position	Name	From	Type/fee	Contract length	Date	Ref.
10	MF	Lachlan Bayliss	Newcastle Jets	Free transfer	3 years	1 July 2026	
16	MF	(Norway) Daniel Normann	Auckland OFC Squad	Promotion	2 years	15 July 2026	
23	DF	Ronan Wynne	Auckland OFC Squad	Promotion	2 years	15 July 2026	
24	FW	Aaron Cartwright	Melbourne City Youth	Free transfer	Undisclosed	22 July 2026	
28	DF	(Australia) Aaron Calver	(Australia) Hume City	Free transfer	Undisclosed	24 July 2026	
18	MF	Marley Leuluai	Unattached	Scholarship	Undisclosed	16 September 2026	

==== From youth squad ====
N	Pos.	Nat.	Name	Age	Notes
57	FW	(New Zealand)	Van Fitzharris	18	Two-year scholarship contract
21	FW	(New Zealand)	Isa Prins	20	Two-year scholarship contract
18	FW	(Australia)	Bailey Ferguson	18	Two-year scholarship contract

=== Transfers out ===
No.	Position	Player	Transferred to	Type/fee	Date	Ref.
16	DF	Adama Coulibaly	(New Zealand) Auckland United	End of contract	20 June 2026	
3	DF	(Australia) Jake Girdwood-Reich	(United States) St. Louis City	End of loan	30 June 2026	
10	FW	(Uruguay) Guillermo May	Unattached	End of contract	30 June 2026	
11	FW	(Australia) Marlee Francois	Unattached	End of contract	30 June 2026	
12	GK	(Australia) James Hilton	Macarthur FC	End of contract	30 June 2026	
14	FW	Liam Gillion	Western Sydney Wanderers	End of contract	30 June 2026	
18	MF	Finn McKenlay	Unattached	End of contract	30 June 2026	
21	FW	Jesse Randall	(Scotland) Dundee United	Free Transfer	30 June 2026	
23	DF	(Fiji) Dan Hall	(Japan) JEF United Chiba	End of contract	30 June 2026	
6	MF	(Belgium) Louis Verstraete	(Belgium) Patro Eisden	Undisclosed	20 July 2026	
18	FW	Bailey Ferguson	Unattached	Mutual contract termination	21 August 2026	

=== Contract extensions ===
No.	Position	Player	Duration	Date	Notes	Ref
7	MF	Cameron Howieson	2 years	5 June 2026		
1	GK	Michael Woud	Undisclosed	9 June 2026	Was contracted until end of the 2026–27 season	
35	FW	Jonty Bidois	Undisclosed	4 July 2026	Upgraded to full-pro contract	
19	MF	Oliver Middleton	Undisclosed	4 July 2026	Upgraded to full-pro contract	
8	MF	(Chile) Felipe Gallegos	1 year	6 July 2026		
30	GK	Joseph Knowles	1 year	21 July 2026		

== Pre-season and friendlies ==
26 July 2026	Auckland FC (New Zealand)	0–2	(England) Tottenham Hotspur	Auckland, New Zealand
15:00 NZST		Report (Auckland FC); Report (Spurs)	Scarlett 12'; Richarlison 70'	Stadium: Eden Park; Attendance: 40,112; Referee: Campbell-Kirk Kawana-Waugh (New Zealand)

13 August 2026	Auckland FC (New Zealand)	4–2	(New Zealand) East Coast Bays	Auckland, New Zealand
19:00 NZST	Rogerson (?); Bidois (?); Fitzharris (?); de Vries (?)	Report	Wicks (?); ? (?)	Stadium: Fred Taylor Park

18 August 2026	Auckland FC (New Zealand)	5–0	(New Zealand) Eastern Suburbs	Auckland, New Zealand
19:00 NZST	Bayliss; Cosgrove; Bidois; Fitzharris	Report		Stadium: Michaels Avenue Reserve

8 September 2026	Newcastle Jets (Australia)	2–2	(New Zealand) Auckland FC	Sydney, Australia
	?; ?	Report	Bayliss; Brook	Attendance: 0 (behind closed doors)

September 2026	Macarthur FC (Australia)	3–2	(New Zealand) Auckland FC	Sydney, Australia
		Report		Attendance: 0 (behind closed doors)

19 September 2026	Auckland FC (New Zealand)	1–3	(Australia) Western Sydney Wanderers	Napier, New Zealand
15:00 NZST	Bayliss 29'	Report	Borrello 4', 49'; Gillion 12'	Stadium: McLean Park; Attendance: 5,000+

3 October 2026	Birkenhead United (New Zealand)	0–1	(New Zealand) Auckland FC	Auckland, New Zealand
15:00 NZDT		Report	Prins	Stadium: Shepherds Park

== Competitions ==
=== Overall record ===
Competition	First match	Last match	Starting round	Final position	Record							
Competition	First match	Last match	Starting round	Final position	Pld	W	D	L	GF	GA	GD	Win %
A-League Men	17 October 2026	8 May 2027	Matchday 1	TBD	5	1	3	1	7	8	−1	20.00
FIFA Intercontinental Cup	26 August 2026		First round	First round	1	0	0	1	0	1	−1	0.00
Total					6	1	3	2	7	9	−2	16.67

Last updated: 22 November 2026
Source: Competitions

=== A-League Men ===
==== League table ====
Pos	Team	Pld	W	D	L	GF	GA	GD	Pts	Qualification
6	Perth Glory	5	2	1	2	8	5	+3	7	Qualification for the finals series (Note: The top two teams enter the finals series at the semi-finals, while the teams ranked third to sixth enter the finals series at the elimination-finals.)
7	Melbourne City	4	2	1	1	6	6	0	7	
8	Auckland FC (Note: Auckland FC and Wellington Phoenix cannot qualify for Asian Football Confederation competitions as they are based in New Zealand, which is part of the Oceania Football Confederation.)	5	1	3	1	7	8	−1	6	
9	Melbourne Victory	5	0	4	1	6	7	−1	4	
10	Central Coast Mariners	5	0	3	2	4	9	−5	3	

Updated to match(es) played on 22 November 2026. Source: A-Leagues
Rules for classification: 1) points; 2) goal difference; 3) goals scored; 4) wins; 5) head-to-head results; 5a) head-to-head points; 5b) head-to-head goal difference; 6) Fair Play points; 7) away goal difference; 8) away goals per match; 9) home goal difference; 10) home goals per match; 11) toss of a coin in an event of a tie of two clubs.

==== Results summary ====
As of 22 November 2026.

Overall								Home						Away					
Pld	W	D	L	GF	GA	GD	Pts	W	D	L	GF	GA	GD	W	D	L	GF	GA	GD
5	1	3	1	7	8	−1	6	1	2	0	4	2	+2	0	1	1	3	6	−3

==== Results by round ====
Round	1	2	3	4	5	6	7	8	9	10	11	12	13	14	15	16	17	18	19	20	21	22	23	24	25	26	27	28
Ground	H	A	A	H	H	A	B	H	A	A	H	A	A	H	H	A	H	B	A	H	H	A	H	A	H	A	A	H
Result	W	L	D	D	D		X											X										
Position	1	6	6	8	7																							
Points	3	3	4	5	6																							

Updated to match(es) played on 22 November 2026. Source: Ultimate A-League
A = Away; H = Home; W = Win; D = Draw; L = Loss; X = Bye

==== Matches ====
Win Draw Loss Fixtures

17 October 2026 1	Auckland FC	3–1	Melbourne City	Auckland
17:00 NZDT	Bayliss 35', 53'; Brook 85'	Report	MacNicol 42'	Stadium: Go Media Stadium; Attendance: 20,635; Referee: Tim Danaskos

24 October 2026 2	Western Sydney Wanderers	5–2	Auckland FC	Sydney
19:00 AEDT	Borrello 43'; Gillion 46'; Milanovic 50'; Di Pizio 86'; Waraga 89'	Report	Vicelich 24'; Borrello 68' (o.g.)	Stadium: CommBank Stadium; Attendance: 8,283; Referee: Shaun Evans

30 October 2026 3	Brisbane Roar	1–1	Auckland FC	Brisbane
18:00 AEST	Aldred 90+5'	Report	Sakai 11'	Stadium: Suncorp Stadium; Attendance: 7,284; Referee: Lachlan Keevers

7 November 2026 4	Auckland FC	0–0	Wellington Phoenix	Auckland
17:00 NZDT		Report		Stadium: Go Media Stadium; Attendance: 18,477; Referee: Alex King

21 November 2026 5	Auckland FC	1–1	Melbourne Victory	Auckland
17:00 NZDT	Bayliss 89'	Report	Sawyer 38'	Stadium: Go Media Stadium; Attendance: 10,093; Referee: Nathan Shakespear

28 November 2026 6	Central Coast Mariners	v	Auckland FC	Gosford
19:40 AEDT		Report		Stadium: Polytec Stadium

12 December 2026 8	Auckland FC	v	Sydney FC	Auckland
17:00 NZDT		Report		Stadium: Go Media Stadium

19 December 2026 9	Wellington Phoenix	v	Auckland FC	Wellington
17:00 NZDT		Report		Stadium: Hnry Stadium

27 December 2026 10	Melbourne City	v	Auckland FC	Melbourne
18:00 AEDT		Report		Stadium: AAMI Park

1 January 2027 11	Auckland FC	v	Adelaide United	Auckland
17:00 NZDT		Report		Stadium: Go Media Stadium

9 January 2027 12	Newcastle Jets	v	Auckland FC	Newcastle
19:00 AEDT		Report		Stadium: McDonald Jones Stadium

15 January 2027 13	Melbourne Victory	v	Auckland FC	Melbourne
19:40 AEDT		Report		Stadium: AAMI Park

24 January 2027 14	Auckland FC	v	Perth Glory	Auckland
15:00 NZDT		Report		Stadium: Go Media Stadium

31 January 2027 15	Auckland FC	v	Brisbane Roar	Auckland
15:00 NZDT		Report		Stadium: Go Media Stadium

6 February 2027 16	Macarthur FC	v	Auckland FC	Sydney
16:00 AEDT		Report		Stadium: Campbelltown Sports Stadium

13 February 2027 17	Auckland FC	v	Wellington Phoenix	Auckland
17:00 NZDT		Report		Stadium: Go Media Stadium

27 February 2027 19	Sydney FC	v	Auckland FC	Sydney
17:00 AEDT		Report		Stadium: Allianz Stadium

7 March 2027 20	Auckland FC	v	Central Coast Mariners	Auckland
15:00 NZDT		Report		Stadium: Go Media Stadium

13 March 2027 21	Auckland FC	v	Newcastle Jets	Auckland
17:00 NZDT		Report		Stadium: Go Media Stadium

20 March 2027 22	Western Sydney Wanderers	v	Auckland FC	Sydney
19:00 AEDT		Report		Stadium: CommBank Stadium; Referee: Alex King

4 April 2027 23	Auckland FC	v	Macarthur FC	Auckland
15:00 NZST		Report		Stadium: Go Media Stadium

10 April 2027 24	Perth Glory	v	Auckland FC	Perth
19:45 AWST		Report		Stadium: HBF Park

18 April 2027 25	Auckland FC	v	Brisbane Roar	Auckland
15:00 NZDT		Report		Stadium: Go Media Stadium

23 April 2027 26	Sydney FC	v	Auckland FC	Sydney
17:00 AEST		Report		Stadium: Allianz Stadium

1 May 2027 27	Adelaide United	v	Auckland FC	Adelaide
19:05 ACST		Report		Stadium: Coopers Stadium

8 May 2027 28	Auckland FC	v	Western Sydney Wanderers	Auckland
20:00 NZST		Report		Stadium: Go Media Stadium

=== FIFA Intercontinental Cup ===
26 August 2026 First round	Al-Ahli (Saudi Arabia)	1–0	(New Zealand) Auckland FC	Jeddah, Saudi Arabia
21:00 UTC+3:00	Al-Shamat 63'	Report		Stadium: King Abdullah Sports City Stadium; Referee: Amin Omar (Egypt)

== Statistics ==
=== Appearances and goals ===
Includes all competitions. Players with no appearances not included in the list.

As of 21 November 2026

No.	Pos	Nat	Player	Total		A-League Men		FIFA Intercontinental Cup	
No.	Pos	Nat	Player	Apps	Goals	Apps	Goals	Apps	Goals
Goalkeepers
1	GK	(New Zealand) NZL	Michael Woud	6	0	5	0	1	0
Defenders
2	DF	(Japan) JPN	Hiroki Sakai	6	1	5	1	1	0
4	DF	(New Zealand) NZL	Nando Pijnaker	6	0	5	0	1	0
15	DF	(New Zealand) NZL	Francis de Vries	6	0	5	0	1	0
17	DF	(New Zealand) NZL	Callan Elliot	6	0	1+4	0	0+1	0
23	DF	(New Zealand) NZL	Ronan Wynne	4	0	3	0	0+1	0
25	DF	(New Zealand) NZL	Luka Vicelich	2	1	2	1	0	0
28	DF	(Australia) AUS	Aaron Calver	1	0	0	0	1	0
Midfielders
7	MF	(New Zealand) NZL	Cameron Howieson	1	0	0	0	0+1	0
8	MF	(Chile) CHI	Felipe Gallegos	6	0	5	0	1	0
10	MF	(New Zealand) NZL	Lachlan Bayliss	6	3	5	3	1	0
16	MF	(Norway) NOR	Daniel Normann	6	0	2+3	0	1	0
22	MF	(Malta) MLT	Jake Brimmer	3	0	3	0	0	0
57	MF	(New Zealand) NZL	Van Fitzharris	5	0	0+4	0	0+1	0
Forwards
9	FW	(England) ENG	Sam Cosgrove	5	0	4	0	1	0
21	FW	(New Zealand) NZL	Isa Prins	3	0	0+3	0	0	0
27	FW	(New Zealand) NZL	Logan Rogerson	5	0	4	0	1	0
35	FW	(New Zealand) NZL	Jonty Bidois	3	0	1+2	0	0	0
77	FW	(Australia) AUS	Lachlan Brook	6	1	5	1	1	0

=== Disciplinary record ===
Includes all competitions. The list is sorted by squad number when total cards are equal. Players with no cards not included in the list.

As of 21 November 2026

Rank	No.	Pos.	Nat.	Name	A-League Men			FIFA Intercontinental Cup			Total							
Rank	No.	Pos.	Nat.	Name	Yellow card	(yellow card) (yellow-red card)	Red card	Yellow card	(yellow card) (yellow-red card)	Red card	Yellow card	(yellow card) (yellow-red card)	Red card					
Rank	No.	Pos.	Nat.	Name	1	9	FW	(England)	Sam Cosgrove	3	0	0	0	0	1	3	0	1
2	15	DF	(New Zealand)	Francis de Vries	1	0	0	0	0	0	1	0	0					
2	17	DF	(New Zealand)	Callan Elliot	1	0	0	0	0	0	1	0	0					
2	27	FW	(New Zealand)	Logan Rogerson	1	0	0	0	0	0	1	0	0					
2	77	FW	(Australia)	Lachlan Brook	1	0	0	0	0	0	1	0	0					
Total					7	0	0	0	0	1	7	0	1					

=== Clean sheets ===
Includes all competitions. The list is sorted by squad number when total clean sheets are equal. Numbers in parentheses represent games where both goalkeepers participated and both kept a clean sheet; the number in parentheses is awarded to the goalkeeper who was substituted on, whilst a full clean sheet is awarded to the goalkeeper who was on the field at the start of play. Goalkeepers with no clean sheets not included in the list.

As of 21 November 2026

Rank	No.	Nat.	Goalkeeper	A-League Men	FIFA Intercontinental Cup	Total
1	1	(New Zealand)	Michael Woud	1	0	0
Total				1	0	1
