= 2025–26 Auckland FC season =

Auckland FC
2025–26 season
- Owner: Black Knight Football and Entertainment
- Chairman: Bill Foley
- Head Coach: Steve Corica
- Stadium: Mount Smart Stadium
- A-League Men: 3rd
- A-League Men Finals: Champions
- Australia Cup: Semi-final
- Top goalscorer: League: Sam Cosgrove (11); All: Sam Cosgrove; Jesse Randall (12)
- Highest home attendance: 28,374 vs. Sydney FC (23 May 2026); A-League Men finals
- Lowest home attendance: 10,077 vs. Melbourne Victory (11 April 2026); A-League Men
- Average home league attendance: 13,221
- Biggest win: 5–0 vs. Wellington Phoenix (A) (21 February 2026); A-League Men
- Biggest defeat: 0–2 vs. Heidelberg United (A) (30 August 2025); Australia Cup; 1–3 vs. Newcastle Jets (H) (1 January 2026); A-League Men
Home colours	Away colours	Third colours

The 2025–26 Auckland Football Club season was the club's second season in the A-League Men, the top flight of Australian soccer. The club also competed in the Australia Cup for the first time. The season covered the period from 1 July 2025 until 30 June 2026.

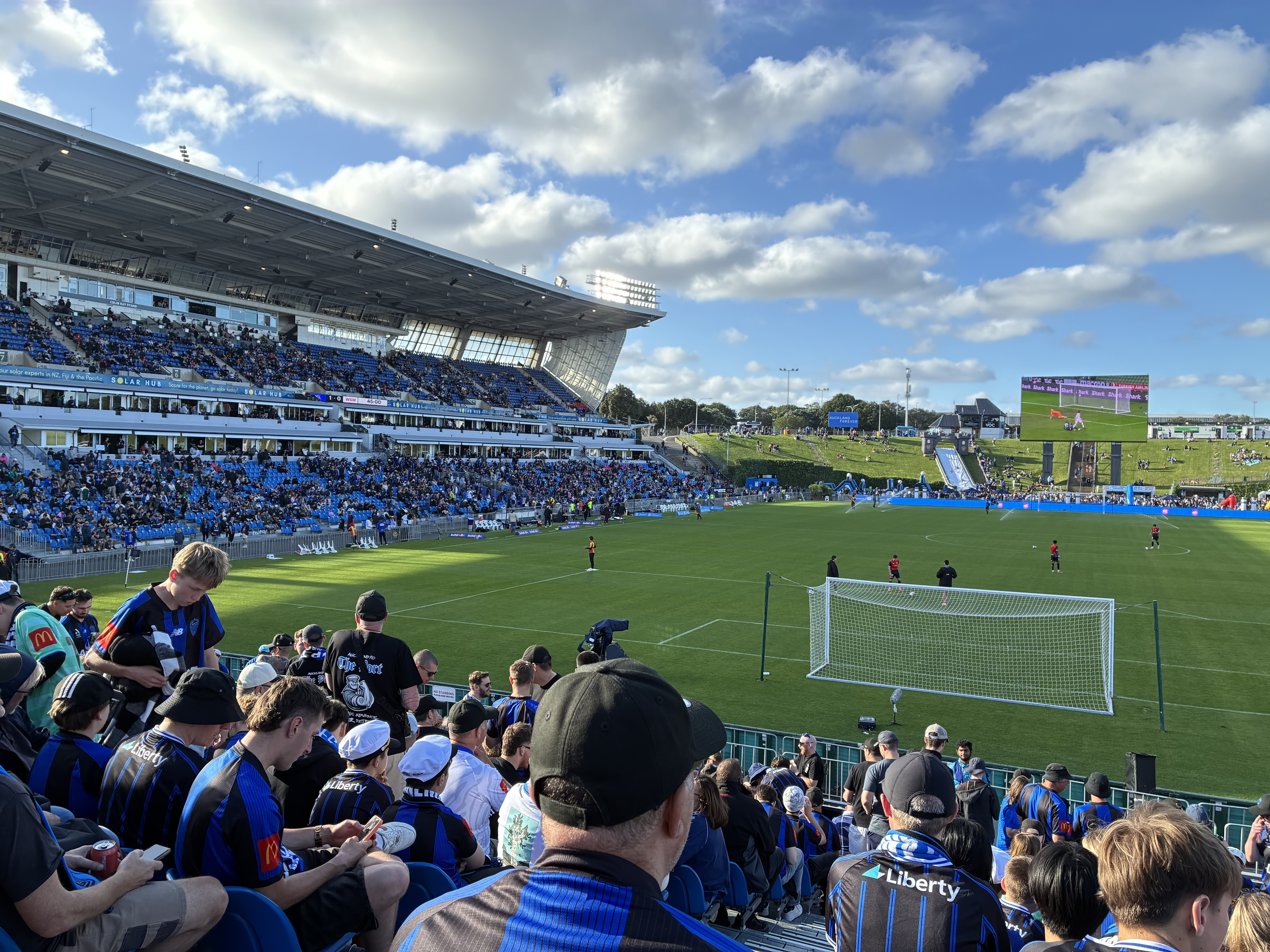
Auckland FC at half-time during their first home match of the 2025–26 season against Western Sydney Wanderers at Go Media Stadium

== Players ==
Note: Flags indicate national team as defined under FIFA eligibility rules; some limited exceptions apply. Players may hold more than one non-FIFA nationality.

No.	Pos.	Nation	Player
1	GK	NZL	Michael Woud
2	DF	JPN	Hiroki Sakai (captain)
3	DF	AUS	Jake Girdwood-Reich (on loan from St. Louis City)
4	DF	NZL	Nando Pijnaker
6	MF	BEL	Louis Verstraete
7	MF	NZL	Cameron Howieson
8	MF	CHI	Felipe Gallegos
9	FW	ENG	Sam Cosgrove
10	FW	URU	Guillermo May
11	FW	AUS	Marlee Francois
12	GK	AUS	James Hilton
14	FW	NZL	Liam Gillion (scholarship)
15	DF	NZL	Francis de Vries
16	MF	NZL	Adama Coulibaly (scholarship)

No.	Pos.	Nation	Player
17	DF	NZL	Callan Elliot
18	MF	NZL	Finn McKenlay (scholarship)
19	MF	NZL	Oliver Middleton (scholarship)
20	GK	NZL	Oliver Sail
21	FW	NZL	Jesse Randall
22	MF	MLT	Jake Brimmer (vice-captain)
23	DF	FIJ	Dan Hall
27	FW	NZL	Logan Rogerson
30	GK	NZL	Joseph Knowles (scholarship)
35	FW	NZL	Jonty Bidois (scholarship)
52	DF	NZL	Luka Vicelich (scholarship)
77	FW	AUS	Lachlan Brook

=== Other players with first-team appearances ===
Note: Flags indicate national team as defined under FIFA eligibility rules; some limited exceptions apply. Players may hold more than one non-FIFA nationality.

No.	Pos.	Nation	Player
28	FW	AUS	Bailey Ferguson
43	DF	NZL	Ryan Mackay
45	DF	NZL	Matthew D'Hotman

No.	Pos.	Nation	Player
46	MF	NZL	James Mitchell
50	GK	NZL	Eli Jones
57	MF	NZL	Van Fitzharris

== Transfers ==
Note: Transfers' in/out date may refer to the date of announcement and not the date of signing from the mentioned players.

=== Transfers in ===
No.	Position	Name	From	Type/fee	Contract length	Date	Ref.
12	GK	Scott Morris	(England) Stoke City	Free transfer	1 year	7 July 2025	
77	FW	(Australia) Lachlan Brook	(United States) Real Salt Lake	Free transfer	3 years	7 August 2025	
20	GK	Oliver Sail	Perth Glory	Free transfer	1 year	18 August 2025	
9	FW	(England) Sam Cosgrove	Unattached	Free transfer	2 years	19 August 2025	
3	DF	(Australia) Jake Girdwood-Reich	(United States) St. Louis City	Loan	1 year	12 September 2025	
12	GK	(Australia) James Hilton	(Australia) Marconi Stallions	Free transfer	5 months	6 February 2026	

==== From youth squad ====
N	Pos.	Nat.	Name	Age	Notes
52	DF	(New Zealand)	Luka Vicelich	17	2.5-year scholarship contract

=== Transfers out ===
No.	Position	Player	Transferred to	Type/fee	Date	Ref.
25	FW	(Colombia) Neyder Moreno	Unattached	End of contract	30 June 2025	
9	FW	Max Mata	(England) Shrewsbury Town	End of loan	30 June 2025	
12	GK	Alex Paulsen	(England) Bournemouth	End of loan	30 June 2025	
8	MF	Luis Toomey	Unattached	End of contract	30 June 2025	
5	DF	Tommy Smith	(England) Braintree Town	Mutual contract termination	17 July 2025	
3	DF	(Australia) Scott Galloway	Unattached	Mutual contract termination	21 July 2025	
12	GK	Scott Morris	Retired		2 September 2025	

=== Contract extensions ===
No.	Position	Player	Duration	Date	Notes	Ref
27	Forward	Logan Rogerson	2 years	6 July 2025		
15	Defender	Francis de Vries	3 years	15 January 2026	Contract extended from end of 2025–26 to end of 2028–29	
2	Right-back	(Japan) Hiroki Sakai	1 year	16 April 2026	Contract extended from end of 2025–26 to end of 2026–27	

== Pre-season and friendlies ==
22 July 2025	West Coast Rangers (New Zealand)	0–5	(New Zealand) Auckland FC	Auckland, New Zealand
19:00 NZST		Report (NZF); Report	Rogerson (?); Randall (?); Francois (?); Howieson (?)	Stadium: Fred Taylor Park; Referee: Luke Gardner

3 August 2025	Brisbane Roar (Australia)	2–2	(New Zealand) Auckland FC	Brisbane, Australia
12:00 AEST	Ruhs 38'; Vidic 60'	Report	Randall 33'; Gillion 90'	Stadium: Imperial Corp Stadium

27 August 2025	Western Sydney Wanderers (Australia)	Cancelled	(New Zealand) Auckland FC	Sydney, Australia
		Report		Stadium: Wanderers Football Park

20 September 2025	Auckland FC (New Zealand)	2–0	(New Zealand) Birkenhead United	Auckland, New Zealand
15:00 NZST	Randall; Brook	Report (NZF)		Stadium: Fred Taylor Park; Referee: Ashley Wilson

27 September 2025	Central Coast Mariners (Australia)	0–2	(New Zealand) Auckland FC	Australia
		Report	Cosgrove 60', 86'	Attendance: 0 (behind closed doors)

10 October 2025	Melbourne City (Australia)	0–0	(New Zealand) Auckland FC	Melbourne, Australia
		Report		Stadium: Casey Fields; Attendance: 0 (behind closed doors)

== Competitions ==
=== Overall record ===
Competition	First match	Last match	Starting round	Final position	Record							
Competition	First match	Last match	Starting round	Final position	Pld	W	D	L	GF	GA	GD	Win %
A-League Men	18 October 2025	26 April 2026	Matchday 1	3rd	26	11	9	6	42	29	+13	42.31
A-League Men finals series	2 May 2026	23 May 2026	Elimination-final	Winners	4	2	2	0	6	2	+4	50.00
Australia Cup	29 July 2025	30 August 2025	Round of 32	Semi-final	4	2	1	1	8	3	+5	50.00
Total					34	15	12	7	56	34	+22	44.12

Source: Competitions

=== A-League Men ===
==== League table ====
Pos	Team	Pld	W	D	L	GF	GA	GD	Pts	Qualification
1	Newcastle Jets	26	15	3	8	55	39	+16	48	Qualification for the AFC Champions League Elite league stage and the finals series (Note: The top two teams enter the finals series at the semi-finals, while the teams ranked third to sixth enter the finals series at the elimination-finals.)
2	Adelaide United	26	12	7	7	46	36	+10	43	Qualification for the AFC Champions League Elite preliminary stage and the finals series
3	Auckland FC (Note: Auckland FC and Wellington Phoenix cannot qualify for Asian Football Confederation competitions as they are based in New Zealand, which is part of the Oceania Football Confederation.) (C)	26	11	9	6	42	29	+13	42	Qualification for the finals series
4	Melbourne Victory	26	11	7	8	44	33	+11	40	Qualification for the AFC Champions League Two group stage and the finals series (Note: Since the 2025 Australia Cup winners, Newcastle Jets, occupy an AFC Champions League Elite position, the AFC Champions League Two spot goes to the next eligible team. The AFC ruled that the Australia Cup runner-up Heidelberg United was ineligible to compete.)
5	Sydney FC	26	11	6	9	33	25	+8	39	Qualification for the finals series

Source: A-Leagues
Rules for classification: 1) points; 2) goal difference; 3) goals scored; 4) wins; 5) head-to-head results; 5a) head-to-head points; 5b) head-to-head goal difference; 6) Fair Play points; 7) away goal difference; 8) away goals per match; 9) home goal difference; 10) home goals per match; 11) toss of a coin in an event of a tie of two clubs.
(C) Champions

==== Results summary ====
Overall								Home						Away					
Pld	W	D	L	GF	GA	GD	Pts	W	D	L	GF	GA	GD	W	D	L	GF	GA	GD
26	11	9	6	42	29	+13	42	5	4	4	20	17	+3	6	5	2	22	12	+10

Last updated: 26 April 2026.
Source: Ultimate A-League

==== Results by round ====
Round	1	2	3	4	5	6	7	8	9	11	17	12	13	14	15	16	10	18	19	20	21	22	23	24	25	26
Ground	A	H	H	A	H	H	H	A	A	H	A	A	A	H	A	H	A	A	H	H	A	H	A	H	H	A
Result	D	W	W	W	D	L	W	W	W	L	D	W	L	D	L	W	D	W	W	D	W	L	D	D	L	D
Position	9	3	1	1	2	3	3	2	1	1	1	1	1	1	3	2	2	2	2	2	2	2	2	2	2	3
Points	1	4	7	10	11	11	14	17	20	20	21	24	24	25	25	28	29	32	35	36	39	39	40	41	41	42

Updated to match(es) played on 26 April 2026. Source: Ultimate A-League
A = Away; H = Home; N = Neutral; B = Bye; W = Win; D = Draw; L = Loss; X = Bye

==== Matches ====
Win Draw Loss Fixtures Postponed

18 October 2025 1	Melbourne Victory	0–0	Auckland FC	Melbourne
19:35 AEDT		Report		Stadium: AAMI Park; Attendance: 11,558; Referee: Daniel Elder

25 October 2025 2	Auckland FC	1–0	Western Sydney Wanderers	Auckland
17:00 NZDT	Randall 21'	Report		Stadium: Go Media Stadium; Attendance: 14,767; Referee: Tim Danaskos

1 November 2025 3	Auckland FC	2–1	Adelaide United	Auckland
17:00 NZDT	Cosgrove 26'; Verstraete 79'	Report	Jovanovic 45'	Stadium: Go Media Stadium; Attendance: 11,240; Referee: Lachlan Keevers

8 November 2025 4	Wellington Phoenix	1–2	Auckland FC	Wellington
19:00 NZDT	Eze 9'	Report	Cosgrove 1', 34'	Stadium: Sky Stadium; Attendance: 12,091; Referee: Ben Abraham

23 November 2025 5	Auckland FC	1–1	Brisbane Roar	Auckland
15:00 NZDT	Brook 18'	Report	Vidic 45+2'	Stadium: Go Media Stadium; Attendance: 12,379; Referee: Ben Abraham

30 November 2025 6	Auckland FC	1–2	Newcastle Jets	Auckland
15:00 NZDT	Verstraete 14'	Report	Dobson 3'; Rose 41'	Stadium: Go Media Stadium; Attendance: 10,387; Referee: Alireza Faghani

6 December 2025 7	Auckland FC	3–1	Wellington Phoenix	Auckland
17:00 NZDT	Brook 7'; de Vries 72'; May 80'	Report	Rufer 55'	Stadium: Go Media Stadium; Attendance: 21,997; Referee: Adam Kersey

12 December 2025 8	Central Coast Mariners	1–2	Auckland FC	Gosford
19:35 AEDT	Elliot 33' (o.g.)	Report	Randall 20'; Cosgrove 58'	Stadium: Polytec Stadium; Attendance: 1,942; Referee: Jack Morgan

19 December 2025 9	Western Sydney Wanderers	0–2	Auckland FC	Sydney
20:00 AEDT		Report	Randall 57'; Brook 74'	Stadium: CommBank Stadium; Attendance: 5,029; Referee: Alex King
Note: The match was originally scheduled for 19:35, but was delayed to 20:00 due to adverse weather conditions.

1 January 2026 11	Auckland FC	1–3	Newcastle Jets	Auckland
17:00 NZDT	Randall 13'	Report	Rose 7', 90+6'; Dobson 16'	Stadium: Go Media Stadium; Attendance: 16,156; Referee: Daniel Elder

5 January 2026 17	Macarthur FC	1–1	Auckland FC	Sydney
16:00 AEDT	Uskok 70'	Report	Brook 41'	Stadium: Campbelltown Sports Stadium; Attendance: 3,543; Referee: Adam Kersey

9 January 2026 12	Brisbane Roar	0–2	Auckland FC	Brisbane
18:35 AEST		Report	Cosgrove 6'; Brook 73'	Stadium: Suncorp Stadium; Attendance: 9,363; Referee: Alireza Faghani

16 January 2026 13	Melbourne City	2–1	Auckland FC	Melbourne
19:35 AEDT	Caputo 70' (pen.); Memeti 81'	Report	Brook 45+2'	Stadium: AAMI Park; Attendance: 5,578; Referee: Shane Skinner

24 January 2026 14	Auckland FC	2–2	Central Coast Mariners	Auckland
17:00 NZDT	Randall 12'; Cosgrove 58'	Report	Lavale 44', 89'	Stadium: Go Media Stadium; Attendance: 10,225; Referee: Adam Kersey

31 January 2026 15	Perth Glory	2–1	Auckland FC	Perth
18:45 AWST	Kucharski 75', 90'	Report	Randall 42'	Stadium: HBF Park; Attendance: 7,528; Referee: Shaun Evans

7 February 2026 16	Auckland FC	1–0	Sydney FC	Auckland
17:00 NZDT	Cosgrove 20'	Report		Stadium: Go Media Stadium; Attendance: 13,050; Referee: Alex King

17 February 2026 10	Sydney FC	1–1	Auckland FC	Sydney
19:00 AEDT	Popovic 84'	Report	Grant 90+5' (o.g.)	Stadium: Leichhardt Oval; Attendance: 6,471; Referee: Daniel Elder
Note: The game was postponed from 27 December 2025, due to the Leichhardt Oval pitch not being ready to accommodate games.

21 February 2026 18	Wellington Phoenix	0–5	Auckland FC	Wellington
17:00 NZDT		Report	Oluwayemi 24' (o.g.); Randall 30', 45+5'; May 41'; Brook 74'	Stadium: Sky Stadium; Attendance: 10,040; Referee: Lachlan Keevers

28 February 2026 19	Auckland FC	3–0	Melbourne City	Auckland
17:00 NZDT	Rogerson 43'; Randall 59'; May 66'	Report		Stadium: Go Media Stadium; Attendance: 13,112; Referee: Ben Abraham

8 March 2026 20	Auckland FC	2–2	Perth Glory	Auckland
15:00 NZDT	Cosgrove 7'; M. Sutton 64' (o.g.)	Report	Kaltak 39'; Colakovski 57'	Stadium: Go Media Stadium; Attendance: 12,777; Referee: Declan Woods

14 March 2026 21	Newcastle Jets	1–2	Auckland FC	Newcastle
17:00 AEDT	Taylor 28'	Report	Cosgrove 15', 52'	Stadium: McDonald Jones Stadium; Attendance: 12,014; Referee: Alex King

21 March 2026 22	Auckland FC	1–2	Macarthur FC	Auckland
15:00 NZDT	Girdwood-Reich 90+3'	Report	Durán 11'; Uskok 44'	Stadium: Go Media Stadium; Attendance: 11,689; Referee: Daniel Elder

3 April 2026 23	Adelaide United	1–1	Auckland FC	Adelaide
19:05 ACDT	Alagich 25'	Report	Gallegos 48'	Stadium: Coopers Stadium; Attendance: 13,725; Referee: Alex King

11 April 2026 24	Auckland FC	2–2	Melbourne Victory	Auckland
17:00 NZST	Cosgrove 45+4'; Brook 82'	Report	Lino 23'; Velupillay 53'	Stadium: Go Media Stadium; Attendance: 10,077; Referee: Lachlan Keevers

19 April 2026 25	Auckland FC	0–1	Central Coast Mariners	Auckland
15:00 NZST		Report	Auglah 19'	Stadium: Go Media Stadium; Attendance: 14,019; Referee: Jonathan Barreiro

26 April 2026 26	Sydney FC	2–2	Auckland FC	Sydney
15:00 AEST	Garuccio 56'; Popovic 85'	Report	May 67', 90'	Stadium: Allianz Stadium; Attendance: 16,661; Referee: Ben Abraham

==== Finals series ====
2 May 2026 Elimination-final	Auckland FC	1–1 (a.e.t.) (7–6 p)	Melbourne City	Auckland
17:00 NZST	May 45+3'	Report	Memeti 90+4'	Stadium: Go Media Stadium; Attendance: 11,351; Referee: Alex King
	Penalties
	Cosgrove (penalty scored); May (penalty scored); Brimmer (penalty scored); Gillion (penalty scored); Pijnaker (penalty scored); Sakai (penalty scored); Hall (penalty scored)		(penalty scored) Nabbout; (penalty scored) Leckie; (penalty scored) Younis; (penalty scored) Schreiber; (penalty scored) Memeti; (penalty scored) Behich; (penalty missed) Atkinson

9 May 2025 Semi Final 1st Leg	Auckland FC	1–1	Adelaide United	Auckland
18:00 NZST	Brook 24'	Report	Crawford 63'	Stadium: Go Media Stadium; Attendance: 16,903; Referee: Ben Abraham

15 May 2025 Semi Final 2nd Leg	Adelaide United	0–3 (1–4 agg.)	Auckland FC	Adelaide
19:35 ACST		Report	Girdwood-Reich 44'; Cosgrove 58' (pen.); Rogerson 86'	Stadium: Coopers Stadium; Attendance: 14,716; Referee: Daniel Elder

23 May 2026 Grand Final	Auckland FC	1–0	Sydney FC	Auckland
20:10 NZDT	Howieson 60'	Report		Stadium: Go Media Stadium; Attendance: 28,374; Referee: Alex King

=== Australia Cup ===
This was the only time Auckland participated in the Australia Cup, as New Zealand-based teams were omitted from the 2026 edition onwards.

Win Draw Loss

29 July 2025 Round of 32	Gold Coast Knights	0–4	Auckland FC	Gold Coast
19:30 AEST		Report	Randall 1'; Rogerson 19'; May 36'; Gillion 70'	Stadium: Croatian Sports Centre; Attendance: 1,517; Referee: Lara Lee

13 August 2025 Round of 16	South Melbourne	0–3	Auckland FC	Melbourne
19:30 AEST		Report	Randall 17', 58'; Rogerson 69'	Stadium: Lakeside Stadium; Attendance: 3,712; Referee: Declan Woods

23 August 2025 Quarter-final	Sydney FC	1–1 (a.e.t.) (1–3 p)	Auckland FC	Sydney
19:30 AEST	Lolley 87'	Report	Brook 85'	Stadium: Jubilee Stadium; Referee: Casey Reibelt
	Penalties
	Grant (penalty scored); King (penalty missed); Macallister (penalty missed); Lolley (penalty missed)		(penalty scored) Cosgrove; (penalty missed) May; (penalty scored) de Vries; (penalty scored) Brimmer

30 August 2025 Semi-final	Heidelberg United	2–0	Auckland FC	Melbourne
19:30 AEST	Juach 75'; Yokokawa 84'	Report		Stadium: Olympic Park; Attendance: 3,034

== Statistics ==
=== Appearances and goals ===
Includes all competitions. Players with no appearances not included in the list.

As of 23 May 2026

No.	Pos	Nat	Player	Total		A-League Men		A-League Men finals series		Australia Cup	
No.	Pos	Nat	Player	Apps	Goals	Apps	Goals	Apps	Goals	Apps	Goals
Goalkeepers
1	GK	(New Zealand) NZL	Michael Woud	32	0	23+1	0	4	0	4	0
12	GK	(Australia) AUS	James Hilton	2	0	2	0	0	0	0	0
20	GK	(New Zealand) NZL	Oliver Sail	1	0	1	0	0	0	0	0
Defenders
2	DF	(Japan) JPN	Hiroki Sakai	26	0	14+4	0	4	0	4	0
4	DF	(New Zealand) NZL	Nando Pijnaker	18	0	8+5	0	2+2	0	1	0
15	DF	(New Zealand) NZL	Francis de Vries	29	1	22	1	0+3	0	4	0
17	DF	(New Zealand) NZL	Callan Elliot	31	0	16+7	0	4	0	3+1	0
23	DF	(Fiji) FIJ	Dan Hall	33	0	25	0	4	0	4	0
43	DF	(New Zealand) NZL	Ryan Mackay	1	0	0+1	0	0	0	0	0
52	DF	(New Zealand) NZL	Luka Vicelich	7	0	1+2	0	0+2	0	0+2	0
Midfielders
3	MF	(Australia) AUS	Jake Girdwood-Reich	29	2	21+4	1	4	1	0	0
6	MF	(Belgium) BEL	Louis Verstraete	30	2	21+3	2	4	0	0+2	0
7	MF	(New Zealand) NZL	Cameron Howieson	29	1	7+14	0	4	1	3+1	0
8	MF	(Chile) CHI	Felipe Gallegos	28	1	17+7	1	0	0	4	0
18	MF	(New Zealand) NZL	Finn McKenlay	1	0	0	0	0	0	0+1	0
19	MF	(New Zealand) NZL	Oliver Middleton	3	0	0+1	0	0	0	0+2	0
22	MF	(Malta) MLT	Jake Brimmer	20	0	9+6	0	0+1	0	1+3	0
46	MF	(New Zealand) NZL	James Mitchell	2	0	0+2	0	0	0	0	0
57	MF	(New Zealand) NZL	Van Fitzharris	3	0	0+2	0	0+1	0	0	0
Forwards
9	FW	(England) ENG	Sam Cosgrove	31	12	23+2	11	3+1	1	0+2	0
10	FW	(Uruguay) URU	Guillermo May	30	7	13+11	5	2	1	4	1
11	FW	(Australia) AUS	Marlee Francois	17	1	4+9	0	0	0	4	1
14	FW	(New Zealand) NZL	Liam Gillion	12	1	0+5	0	0+4	0	0+3	1
21	FW	(New Zealand) NZL	Jesse Randall	34	12	26	9	4	0	4	3
27	FW	(New Zealand) NZL	Logan Rogerson	32	3	13+11	1	1+3	1	4	1
28	FW	(Australia) AUS	Bailey Ferguson	2	0	0+2	0	0	0	0	0
35	FW	(New Zealand) NZL	Jonty Bidois	10	0	0+10	0	0	0	0	0
77	FW	(Australia) AUS	Lachlan Brook	32	10	20+5	8	4	1	0+3	1

=== Disciplinary record ===
Includes all competitions. The list is sorted by squad number when total cards are equal. Players with no cards not included in the list.

As of 23 May 2026

Rank	No.	Pos.	Nat.	Name	A-League Men			A-League Men finals series			Australia Cup			Total							
Rank	No.	Pos.	Nat.	Name	Booked	(yellow card) (yellow-red card)	Sent off (straight red)	Booked	(yellow card) (yellow-red card)	Sent off (straight red)	Booked	(yellow card) (yellow-red card)	Sent off (straight red)	Booked	(yellow card) (yellow-red card)	Sent off (straight red)					
Rank	No.	Pos.	Nat.	Name	1	23	DF	(Fiji)	Dan Hall	2	0	1	2	0	0	0	0	0	3	0	1
2	27	FW	(New Zealand)	Logan Rogerson	1	0	1	0	0	0	0	0	0	1	0	1					
3	9	FW	(England)	Sam Cosgrove	6	0	0	3	0	0	0	0	0	7	0	0					
4	6	MF	(Belgium)	Louis Verstraete	6	0	0	2	0	0	0	0	0	6	0	0					
4	77	FW	(Australia)	Lachlan Brook	5	0	0	0	0	0	1	0	0	6	0	0					
6	2	DF	(Japan)	Hiroki Sakai	3	0	0	1	0	0	1	0	0	5	0	0					
7	7	MF	(New Zealand)	Cameron Howieson	2	0	0	1	0	0	1	0	0	4	0	0					
7	8	MF	(Chile)	Felipe Gallegos	3	0	0	0	0	0	1	0	0	4	0	0					
7	10	FW	(Uruguay)	Guillermo May	4	0	0	0	0	0	0	0	0	4	0	0					
10	3	DF	(Australia)	Jake Girdwood-Reich	3	0	0	0	0	0	0	0	0	3	0	0					
10	11	FW	(Australia)	Marlee Francois	2	0	0	0	0	0	1	0	0	3	0	0					
12	1	GK	(New Zealand)	Michael Woud	2	0	0	0	0	0	0	0	0	2	0	0					
12	15	DF	(New Zealand)	Francis de Vries	2	0	0	0	0	0	0	0	0	2	0	0					
12	21	FW	(New Zealand)	Jesse Randall	2	0	0	0	0	0	0	0	0	2	0	0					
12	22	MF	(Malta)	Jake Brimmer	1	0	0	1	0	0	0	0	0	2	0	0					
16	4	DF	(New Zealand)	Nando Pijnaker	0	0	0	2	0	0	1	0	0	1	0	0					
16	17	DF	(New Zealand)	Callan Elliot	1	0	0	1	0	0	0	0	0	1	0	0					
16	18	MF	(New Zealand)	Finn McKenlay	0	0	0	0	0	0	1	0	0	1	0	0					
16	19	MF	(New Zealand)	Oliver Middleton	0	0	0	0	0	0	1	0	0	1	0	0					
16	35	FW	(New Zealand)	Jonty Bidois	1	0	0	0	0	0	0	0	0	1	0	0					
Total					46	0	2	12	0	0	8	0	0	66	0	2					

=== Clean sheets ===
Includes all competitions. The list is sorted by squad number when total clean sheets are equal. Numbers in parentheses represent games where both goalkeepers participated and both kept a clean sheet; the number in parentheses is awarded to the goalkeeper who was substituted on, whilst a full clean sheet is awarded to the goalkeeper who was on the field at the start of play. Goalkeepers with no clean sheets not included in the list.

As of 23 May 2026

Rank	No.	Nat.	Goalkeeper	A-League Men	A-League Men finals series	Australia Cup	Total
1	1	(New Zealand)	Michael Woud	7	2	2	11
Total				7	1	2	11

== Awards ==
=== Players ===
No.	Pos.	Player	Award	Source
15	DF	(New Zealand) Francis de Vries	A-League Men Player of the Month (December)	

=== Managers ===
Manager	Award	Source
(Australia) Steve Corica	A-League Men Coach of the Month (December)	
