= Cameron Howieson =

New Zealand footballer (born 1994)

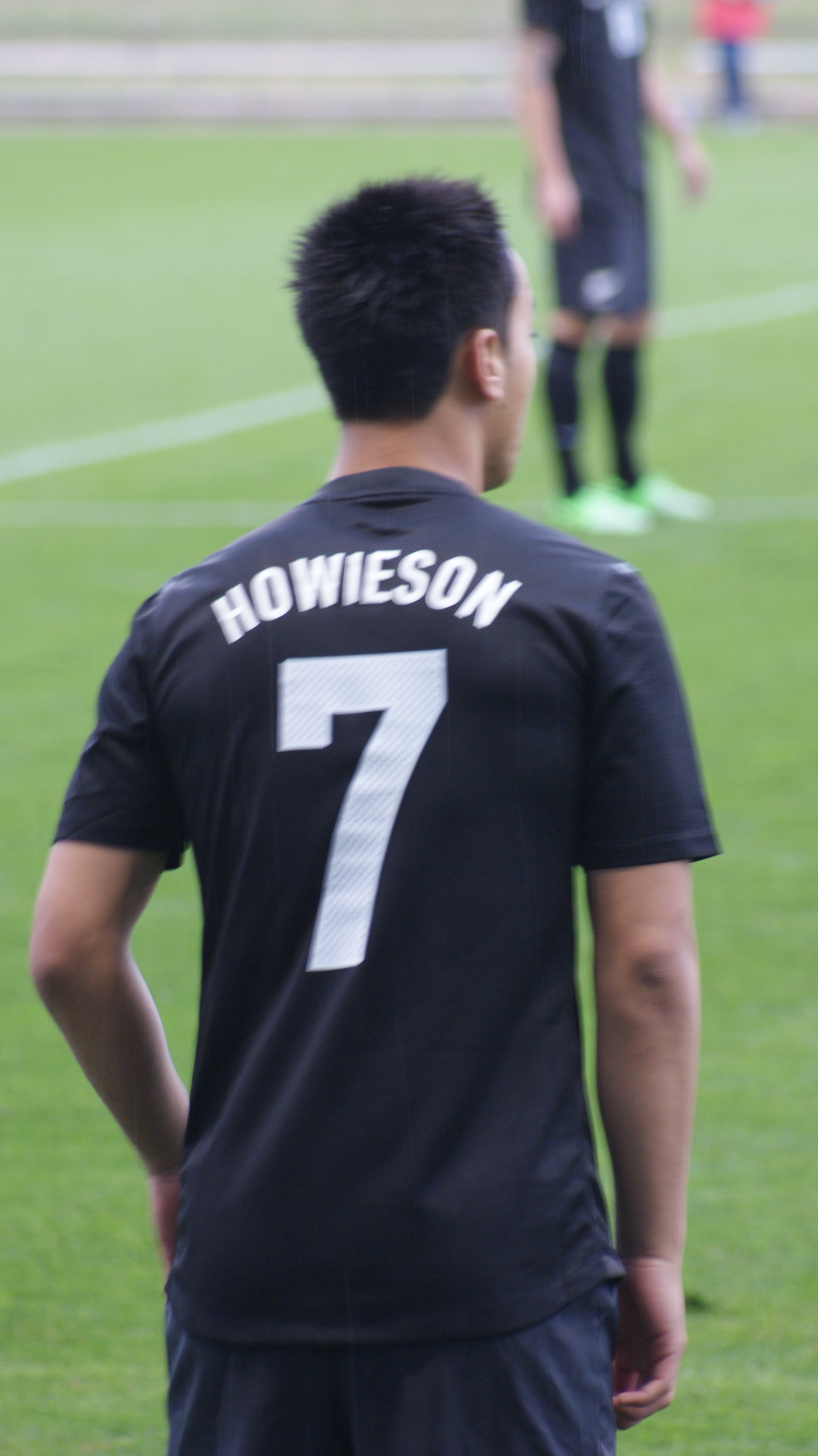
- Howieson playing for New Zealand U20 in 2013

Personal information
- Full name: Cameron Drew Neru Howieson
- Date of birth: 22 December 1994 (age 31)
- Place of birth: Blenheim, New Zealand
- Height: 5 ft 11 in (1.80 m)
- Position: Attacking midfielder

Team information
- Current team: Auckland FC
- Number: 7

Youth career
- 2008–2010: Mosgiel AFC
- 2010–2011: Asia–Pacific Football Academy
- 2011–2012: Burnley

Senior career*
Years	Team	Apps	(Gls)
2012–2015	Burnley	2	(0)
2013	→ Doncaster Rovers (loan)	0	(0)
2015–2016	St Mirren	15	(1)
2016–2017	Team Wellington	9	(1)
2017–2024	Auckland City	191	(42)
2024–	Auckland FC	45	(1)

International career^{‡}
2011	New Zealand U17	7	(2)
2013	New Zealand U20	8	(2)
2012	New Zealand Olympic	6	(0)
2012–	New Zealand	20	(1)
Medal record
Men's football
Representing New Zealand
OFC Nations Cup
Winner	2024 Fiji–Vanuatu
OFC U-20 Championship
Winner	2013 Fiji
OFC U-17 Championship
Winner	2011 New Zealand
- * Club domestic league appearances and goals as of 23 May 2026 ‡ National team caps and goals as of 30 June 2024

Cameron Drew Neru Howieson (born 22 December 1994) is a New Zealand professional footballer who plays as an attacking midfielder for A-League club Auckland FC and the New Zealand national team.

Howieson signed a professional two-and-a-half-year contract with Burnley in March 2012, having joined from the Asia–Pacific Football Academy in July 2011, having previously played for Mosgiel AFC. He made his first-team debut in April 2012. He represented New Zealand at youth level, winning the 2011 OFC U-17 Championship and 2013 OFC U-20 Championship, before making his senior international debut in 2012, later winning the 2024 OFC Men's Nations Cup.

== Club career ==
=== Early career ===
Howieson started his career with Mosgiel AFC, whilst attending Otago Boys' High School for two years, before departing for the Lincoln-based Asia–Pacific Football Academy in 2010, where he played for two years. He was spotted by football scout Graham McMann – a former under-16 coach at Burnley – whilst playing in the under-14 South Island tournament in Timaru. McMann continued to track his progress at the APFA for two years, where he had formerly worked as a scout. McMann got in touch with his contacts at Football League side Burnley, who agreed to give Howieson a week on trial in April 2011. He made an instant impression on the club's coaching staff after scoring two goals in a trial match against Carlisle United.

=== Burnley ===
Howieson signed a two-year scholarship with Burnley in July 2011, after impressing on trial. He scored his first goal for the youth team in November 2011, in a 6–1 win over rivals Preston North End. Howieson grabbed headlines when he scored two goals in the FA Youth Cup quarter final against Fulham in February 2012, helping the Clarets in to the semi-finals for the first time since 1978. His performances in the FA Youth Cup attracted interests from Newcastle and Liverpool in March 2012. On 29 March 2012, Howieson signed professional terms with Burnley on a two-and-a-half-year deal, keeping him at the club until June 2014. On 31 March, Howieson was named on the bench for Burnley's game away at Portsmouth and as such was given squad number 32, however, he was an unused substitute. He made his senior debut three days later in a 3–1 defeat against Birmingham City in the Football League Championship, replacing Josh McQuoid as an 84th-minute substitute. Whilst doing so, he became the youngest ever Kiwi in the Football League at the age of 17 years and 103 days, beating the previous record by 22 days, set by Chris Wood for West Bromwich Albion in April 2009. He also became the youngest Burnley player in a quarter of a century.

On 21 February 2013, he joined League One side Doncaster Rovers on a youth loan until the end of the season.

In April 2015, after struggling to make a breakthrough into the first team, it was announced that Howieson would not be offered a new contract and he was released from the club.

=== St Mirren ===
On 24 July 2015, Howieson joined Scottish Championship side St Mirren on a one-year deal after a trial. He scored a goal on his league debut, a loss to Rangers on 7 August 2015. Howieson was released by St Mirren at the end of the 2015–16 season.

=== Team Wellington ===
Howieson returned to New Zealand in September 2016 to sign with Team Wellington in the New Zealand Football Championship.

=== Auckland City ===
On 10 January 2017, he moved to Auckland City FC.

=== Auckland FC ===
On 30 May 2024, Howieson was announced as one of Auckland FC's first signings.

On 23 May 2026, almost two years to the day after joining the club, he scored his first goal for Auckland FC in the 2026 A-League Men Grand Final, netting the only goal in a 1–0 victory over Sydney FC. The win saw Auckland FC become the first New Zealand club to win the A-League Men Championship. On 6 June, Howieson signed a two-year contract extension with Auckland FC.

== International career ==
Howieson was born in Blenheim, New Zealand, to a Scottish-born father and a mother of Samoan heritage. Under FIFA eligibility rules he can represent New Zealand, Scotland, England and Samoa. In January 2011, Howieson was called up to the New Zealand squad for the 2011 OFC U-17 Championship, hosted by New Zealand. He scored a header in New Zealand's first game of the tournament, in a 5–1 win over Vanuatu. He featured in the remaining three group games as New Zealand progressed to the final. They won their fourth title courtesy of a 2–0 victory over Tahiti in the final, with Howieson scoring a 30-yard free-kick. Due to the tournament win, New Zealand qualified for the 2011 FIFA U-17 World Cup in Mexico. Howieson was part of the squad that participated, featuring in all three group games as New Zealand progressed to the Round-of-16. New Zealand were eventually knocked out by Japan in a 6–0 defeat, however, Howieson was suspended due to picking up two bookings in the group stage. In 2012, Howieson had overtures from a Scottish Football Association scout about switching his international allegiance to Scotland. He stated that he wished to represent New Zealand at the 2015 FIFA U-20 World Cup hosted in his home country.

On 14 May 2012, Howieson was called up to the New Zealand senior squad for their upcoming World Cup qualifiers. On 24 May 2012, Howieson came on as a 72nd-minute substitute in the All White's international friendly against El Salvador. He also made an appearance at the 2012 OFC Nations Cup as a second-half substitute.

On 21 June 2012, Howieson was called up to the New Zealand Under-23 squad for the Summer Olympic Games in London. Howieson the played in all three of New Zealand's fixtures during the games, appearing each time as a substitute. This included a full 45 minute appearance against Brazil which ended in a 3–0 defeat. New Zealand were eliminated from their group after collecting only one point from a 1–1 draw with Egypt.

After a four-year hiatus, Howieson's form at Auckland City led to an All Whites recall under new head coach Fritz Schmid.

== Career statistics ==
=== Club ===
As of match played on 26 August 2026

Appearances and goals by club, season and competition
Club	Season	League			National Cup		League Cup		Continental		Other		Total	
Club	Season	Division	Apps	Goals	Apps	Goals	Apps	Goals	Apps	Goals	Apps	Goals	Apps	Goals
Burnley	2011–12	Championship	2	0	0	0	0	0	—		—		2	0
Burnley	2012–13	Championship	0	0	0	0	0	0	—		—		0	0
Burnley	2013–14	Championship	0	0	0	0	0	0	—		—		0	0
Burnley	2014–15	Premier League	0	0	0	0	0	0	—		—		0	0
Burnley	Total		2	0	0	0	0	0	0	0	0	0	2	0
Doncaster Rovers (loan)	2012–13	League One	0	0	—		—		—		—		0	0
St Mirren	2015–16	Scottish Championship	15	1	1	0	1	0	—		3 (Note: Appearances in Scottish Challenge Cup)	0	20	1
Team Wellington	2016–17	Premiership	9	1	—		—		—		—		9	1
Auckland City	2016–17	Premiership	3	1	—		—		6 (Note: Appearances in OFC Champions League)	1	3 (Note: Two appearances in New Zealand Football Championship play-offs; one appearance in FIFA Club World Cup)	0	12	2
Auckland City	2017–18	Premiership	18	0	—		—		6	0	1 (Note: Appearances in New Zealand Football Championship play-offs)	0	25	0
Auckland City	2018–19	Premiership	17	2	—		—		5	0	1	0	23	2
Auckland City	2019–20	Premiership	15	4	—		—		3	0	—		18	4
Auckland City	2020–21	Premiership	12	4	—		—		—		2	0	14	4
Auckland City	2021	National League	12	1	3	3	—		—		—		15	4
Auckland City	2022	National League	25	8	5	2	—		4	3	1 (Note: Appearance in FIFA Club World Cup)	0	35	13
Auckland City	2023	National League	20	5	3	2	—		7	1	1	0	31	8
Auckland City	2024	National League	3	0	1	2	—		7	2	—		11	4
Auckland City	Total		124	27	12	9	0	0	38	7	12	0	184	43
Auckland FC	2024–25	A-League Men	19	0	—		—		—		1 (Note: Appearances in A-League Finals)	0	20	0
Auckland FC	2025–26	A-League Men	21	0	4	0	—		—		4	1	29	1
Auckland FC	2026–27	A-League Men	0	0	—		—		1 (Note: Appearance in FIFA Intercontinental Cup)	0	0	0	1	0
Auckland FC	Total		40	0	4	0	0	0	1	0	5	1	50	1
Career total			165	27	16	9	1	0	39	7	17	1	234	44

=== International ===
As of match played 30 June 2024

International statistics
National team	Year	Apps	Goals
New Zealand	2012	4	0
New Zealand	2013	2	0
New Zealand	2014	3	0
New Zealand	2015	0	0
New Zealand	2016	0	0
New Zealand	2017	0	0
New Zealand	2018	4	0
New Zealand	2019	0	0
New Zealand	2020	0	0
New Zealand	2021	0	0
New Zealand	2022	3	0
New Zealand	2023	0	0
New Zealand	2024	4	1
Total		20	1

== International goals ==
No.	Date	Venue	Opponent	Score	Result	Competition
1	30 June 2024	VFF Freshwater Stadium, Port Vila, Vanuatu	Vanuatu	1–0	3–0	2024 OFC Men's Nations Cup

== Honours ==
Auckland City

- OFC Champions League: 2017, 2022, 2023, 2024
- New Zealand Football Championship
  - Premiers: 2016–17, 2017–18, 2018–19, 2019–20, 2020–21
  - Champions: 2018, 2020
- New Zealand National League: 2022
- Northern League: 2021, 2022, 2023
- Chatham Cup: 2022
- Charity Cup: 2018, 2019, 2020

Auckland FC

- A-League Premiership: 2024–25
- A-League Men Championship: 2026

New Zealand U17

- OFC U-17 Championship: 2011

New Zealand U20

- OFC U-20 Championship: 2013

New Zealand

- OFC Nations Cup: 2024

Individual

- Joe Marston Medal: 2026
