= Oliver Middleton =

New Zealand footballer (born 2005)

Personal information
- Full name: Oliver James Middleton
- Date of birth: 19 September 2005 (age 21)
- Height: 1.80 m (5 ft 11 in)
- Position: Midfielder

Team information
- Current team: Auckland FC
- Number: 19

Youth career
- 2015–2019: Onehunga Sports
- 2020–2021: Auckland United

Senior career*
Years	Team	Apps	(Gls)
2022–2024	Auckland United	57	(7)
2024–	Auckland FC	1	(0)
2025–	Auckland FC Reserves	15	(1)

International career^{‡}
2023–	New Zealand U20	4	(0)
- * Club domestic league appearances and goals as of 23 November 2025 ‡ National team caps and goals as of 3 October 2025

Oliver James Middleton (born 19 September 2005) is a New Zealand footballer who plays as a midfielder for A-League club Auckland FC.

== Club career ==
=== Auckland United ===
Middleton joined Onehunga Sports at the age of 9 and worked his way up the academy before joining Auckland United when Onehunga Sports merged with Three Kings United. In 2022, he worked his way into the first team, debuting on 1 May 2022 in a 1–1 draw against Waiheke United.

=== Auckland FC ===
On 20 June 2024, Middleton signed as a scholarship player for Auckland FC for their inaugural season. Middleton made his debut for the club on 29 July 2025 in an Australia Cup match against the Gold Coast Knights.

On 4 July 2026, Middleton signed a contract extension with the club alongside fellow scholar Jonty Bidois, upgrading from a scholarship contract to a first-team deal.

== International career ==
In February 2023, Middleton was named to the New Zealand U20's for the first time for the 2023 PSSI U-20 Mini Tournament. He made his debut on 17 February 2023 against Guatemala. Middleton was named to the New Zealand U20 squad for the 2024 OFC U-19 Men's Championship, however, he did not feature at all throughout the tournament.

On 12 September 2025, Middleton was named as part of the 21-player New Zealand U20 squad for the 2025 FIFA U-20 World Cup that took place in Chile from September to October 2025. Middleton made two appearances in the tournament, with New Zealand exiting after the conclusion of the group stage.

== Personal life ==
Middleton attended the University of Auckland and was part of their High Performance Support Programme.

== Career statistics ==
=== Club ===
As of match played on 23 November 2025.

Appearances and goals by club, season and competition
Club	Season	League			Cup (Note: Includes Australia Cup)		Others		Total	
Club	Season	Division	Apps	Goals	Apps	Goals	Apps	Goals	Apps	Goals
Auckland United	2022	National League	13	3	2	1	—		15	4
Auckland United	2023	National League	30	2	0	0	—		30	2
Auckland United	2024	National League	14	2	2	0	—		16	2
Auckland United	Total		57	7	4	1	0	0	61	8
Auckland FC	2024–25	A-League Men	0	0	—		0	0	0	0
Auckland FC	2025–26	A-League Men	1	0	2	0	0	0	3	0
Auckland FC	2026–27	A-League Men	0	0	—		—		0	0
Auckland FC	Total		1	0	2	0	0	0	3	0
Auckland FC Reserves	2025	National League	20	1	0	0	—		20	1
Career total			78	9	6	1	0	0	79	9

== Honours ==
New Zealand U20

- OFC U-19 Men's Championship: 2024

Auckland FC

- A-League Men Championship: 2026
