= James Mitchell (footballer, born 2006) =

New Zealand footballer (born 2007)

Personal information
- Full name: James Mitchell
- Date of birth: 15 August 2006 (age 20)
- Position: Midfielder

Team information
- Current team: Auckland FC Reserves
- Number: 46

Youth career
- Ellerslie
- –2022: Eastern Suburbs

Senior career*
Years	Team	Apps	(Gls)
2026	Eastern Suburbs	19	(0)
2025–	Auckland FC Reserves	32	(2)
2026–	Auckland FC	2	(0)
- * Club domestic league appearances and goals as of 2 May 2026

James Mitchell (born 15 August 2006) is a New Zealand footballer who plays as a midfielder and captains Auckland FC Reserves.

== Club career ==
=== Early career ===
Mitchell played his junior football for Ellerslie, before joining Eastern Suburbs.

=== Eastern Suburbs ===
After playing youth football for Suburbs, Mitchell debuted for their first team on 23 March 2024 against Bay Olympic.

=== Auckland FC ===
On 14 February 2025, Mitchell was named in the inaugural Auckland FC Reserves side. On 21 February 2026, Mitchell made his professional debut for Auckland FC in the A-League Men against Wellington Phoenix.

== International career ==
In May 2025, Mitchell was called up to the New Zealand U20's for the first time in a two-game series against Chile.

== Career statistics ==
=== Club ===
As of match played on 2 May 2026.

Appearances and goals by club, season and competition
Club	Season	League			Cup		Others		Total	
Club	Season	Division	Apps	Goals	Apps	Goals	Apps	Goals	Apps	Goals
Eastern Suburbs	2024	National League	19	0	2	0	—		21	0
Auckland FC Reserves	2025	National League	28	2	0	0	—		28	2
Auckland FC Reserves	2026	National League	4	0	0	0	—		4	0
Auckland FC Reserves	Career total		32	2	0	0	—		32	2
Auckland FC	2025–26	A-League Men	2	0	0	0	0	0	2	0
Career total			18	0	1	0	0	0	19	0
