= Jonty Bidois =

New Zealand footballer (born 2004)

Personal information
- Full name: Jonty Bidois
- Date of birth: 5 November 2004 (age 22)
- Place of birth: Tauranga, New Zealand
- Height: 1.84 m (6 ft 0 in)
- Position: Forward

Team information
- Current team: Auckland FC
- Number: 35

Youth career
- –2016: Waipuna
- 2017: Papamoa
- 2018–2020: Tauranga Boys' College
- 2020–2021: Tauranga City

Senior career*
| Years | Team | Apps | (Gls) |
| 2022–2023 | Tauranga City | 36 | (27) |
| 2023 | Christchurch United | 6 | (1) |
| 2024 | Tauranga City | 14 | (12) |
| 2024– | Auckland FC | 13 | (0) |
| 2025– | Auckland FC Reserves | 21 | (8) |
| 2026– | Auckland FC (OFC) | 4 | (1) |
- * Club domestic league appearances and goals as of 24 May 2026

Jonty Bidois (born 5 November 2004) is a New Zealand professional footballer who plays as a forward for A-League club Auckland FC.

== Early career ==
Bidois scored the only goal as Tauranga Boys' College defeated Hutt International Boys' School 1–0 to win the NZSS Football title in 2022. He scored 36 goals for the First XI, including two in the Super 8 finals of 2021 and 2022. He was also selected for the NZSS U19's football team in 2021.

== Club career ==
From 2022 to 2024 Bidois played for Tauranga City. In the 2023 season he finished as top goal scorer for the NRFL Championship, scoring 22 goals. Bidois joined Christchurch United for the 2023 New Zealand National League. He returned to Tauranga City for the 2024 season where he finished as the 5th top goal scorer of the Northern League with 12 goals in 14 appearances.

On 20 June 2024, Bidois signed for Auckland FC on a scholarship contract for their inaugural A-League Men season. On 22 January 2025, Bidois made his A-League debut against Adelaide United in a 2–2 draw at Coopers Stadium, replacing Max Mata.

During 2025, Bidois primarily played for the Auckland FC Reserves during their inaugural campaign in the Northern League, scoring eight goals in 20 appearances, including a brace in a 3–0 win over Birkenhead United in the National League. Bidois made his first debut for the OFC Professional League side on 6 May 2026, during a 2–1 loss to South Melbourne, he was replaced at half time by Van Fitzharris. On 9 May, he made his second consecutive start and scored his first goal and assisted Everton O'Leary for the second goal in a 2–0 win over Bula FC at Eden Park.

On 4 July 2026, Bidois signed a contract extension with the club alongside fellow scholar Oliver Middleton, upgrading from a scholarship contract to a first-team deal.

== Style of play ==
Bidois has been described as a "fast and smooth finisher", in similar style to his older brother.

== Family and personal life ==
Bidois is the younger brother of New Zealand youth international Riley Bidois.

== Career statistics ==
As of match played 24 May 2026.

Appearances and goals by club, season and competition
| Club | Season | League | | | Cup | | Other | | Total | |
| Club | Season | Division | Apps | Goals | Apps | Goals | Apps | Goals | Apps | Goals |
|---|---|---|---|---|---|---|---|---|---|---|
| Tauranga City | 2022 | NRFL Division 1 | 14 | 5 | 1 | 0 | — | | 15 | 5 |
| Tauranga City | 2023 | NRFL Championship | 21 | 22 | 3 | 5 | — | | 24 | 27 |
| Tauranga City | Total | | 35 | 27 | 4 | 5 | 0 | 0 | 39 | 32 |
| Christchurch United | 2023 | National League | 6 | 1 | 0 | 0 | — | | 6 | 1 |
| Tauranga City | 2024 | National League | 14 | 12 | 2 | 2 | — | | 16 | 14 |
| Auckland FC | 2024–25 | A-League Men | 3 | 0 | — | | 0 | 0 | 3 | 0 |
| Auckland FC | 2025–26 | A-League Men | 10 | 0 | 0 | 0 | 4 | 1 | 14 | 1 |
| Auckland FC | 2026–27 | A-League Men | 0 | 0 | — | | 0 | 0 | 0 | 0 |
| Auckland FC | Total | | 13 | 0 | 0 | 0 | 0 | 0 | 13 | 0 |
| Auckland FC Reserves | 2025 | National League | 21 | 8 | 0 | 0 | — | | 21 | 8 |
| Career total | | | 93 | 49 | 6 | 7 | 0 | 0 | 99 | 56 |

== Honours ==
Tauranga City

- NRFL Championship: 2023

Auckland FC

- A-League Premiership: 2024–25
- A-League Men Championship: 2026
- OFC Professional League: 2026

Individual

- NRFL Championship Top Scorer: 2023
