= Jake Girdwood-Reich =

Australian soccer player (born 2004)

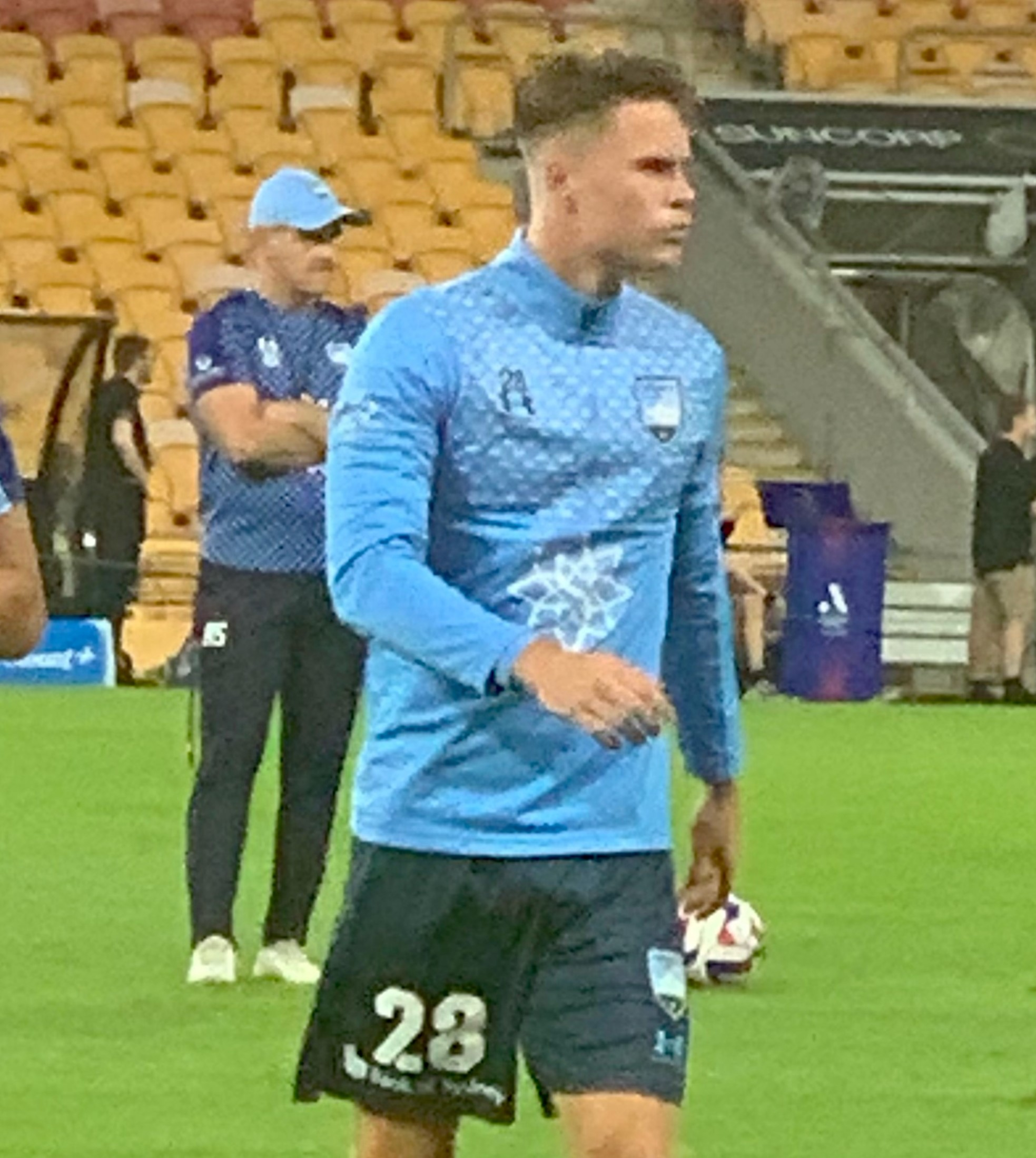
- Girdwood-Reich warming up for Sydney FC vs Brisbane Roar 24 April 2023

Personal information
- Full name: Jake Max Girdwood-Reich
- Date of birth: 26 May 2004 (age 22)
- Place of birth: Clovelly, Australia
- Height: 1.86 m (6 ft 1 in)
- Position: Defensive midfielder

Team information
- Current team: Motherwell
- Number: 3

Youth career
- 2012–2013: Sydney Olympic
- 2014: St Johnstone
- 2016: APIA Leichhardt
- 2017–2020: Sydney FC

Senior career*
Years	Team	Apps	(Gls)
2020–2023	Sydney FC NPL	33	(1)
2022–2024	Sydney FC	39	(1)
2024–2025	St. Louis City 2	2	(0)
2024–2026	St. Louis City SC	18	(0)
2025–2026	→ Auckland FC (loan)	29	(2)
2026–	Motherwell	2	(0)

International career^{‡}
2023	Australia U20	2	(0)
2024	Australia U23	2	(0)
Medal record
Men's football
Representing Australia
WAFF U-23 Championship
Runner-up	2024 Saudi Arabia
- * Club domestic league appearances and goals as of 21 August 2026 ‡ National team caps and goals as of 24 March 2024

Jake Max Girdwood-Reich (Yiddish: [raɪx] rike; born 26 May 2004) is an Australian professional soccer player who plays as a central defender for Scottish Premiership club Motherwell. A versatile player, Girdwood-Reich can also be deployed as a defensive midfielder.

== Early life ==
Jake Max Girdwood-Reich was born on 26 May 2004 in Clovelly, New South Wales . He is of Jewish descent through his mother, with his maternal grandmother is a Holocaust survivor, and Scottish descent through his father. His mother briefly worked with UNICEF in Sydney, which eventually partnered with Sydney FC in 2012. Girdwood-Reich grew up a Sydney FC supporter and became a member when he was six years old.

He is also a supporter of Premier League club Arsenal and Scottish Premiership club Rangers through the influence of the Scottish family of his father. Girdwood-Reich attended Clovelly Public School and Endeavour Sports High School, playing for both the school football teams and state school teams. Outside of school, he played junior football for Sydney University, Sydney Olympic and Scottish club St Johnstone. Girdwood-Reich later played in the under-13s for APIA Leichhardt before signing for Sydney FC Youth at the age of 12. He also played futsal for Mascot Vipers and the NSW representative futsal team.

== Club career ==
=== Sydney FC ===
Girdwood-Reich made his professional debut in an Australia Cup Round of 32 match for Sydney against Central Coast Mariners on 31 July 2022. He made his A-League Men debut for the club as a substitute on 29 October 2022 against Macarthur FC.

Jake won the Sydney FC Rising Star Award at the 2022 Sky Blue Awards night shortly after being promoted to the A-League from the NPL squad. 2024 was selected for the PFA Players A League Team of the Season.

=== St. Louis City SC ===
After a standout 2023–24 A-League season, Girdwood-Reich was sold to Major League Soccer expansion club St. Louis City SC for an undisclosed amount, believed to exceed the $1.3 million record set by Adrian Mierzejewski.

==== Loan to Auckland FC ====
On 16 September 2025, Girdwood-Reich joined Auckland FC on loan for the 2025–26 season as an injury replacement for Nando Pijnaker, reuniting with head coach Steve Corica. He made his Auckland FC debut in a 0–0 draw in round 1 against Melbourne Victory at AAMI Park.

On 20 February 2026, Girdwood-Reich featured in his third New Zealand derby. After scooping the ball high following a clearance, he inadvertently pressured the Wellington Phoenix goalkeeper Josh Oluwayemi into heading the ball into his own net. Auckland FC went on to win 5–0, securing victory in all three derbies of the season, with Girdwood-Reich playing the full 90 minutes in each match.

Girdwood-Reich scored his first goal for the club in a 2–1 defeat to Macarthur at Mount Smart Stadium, becoming Auckland FC's youngest goalscorer. He scored once more in a 3–0 victory over Adelaide United at Hindmarsh Stadium in the second leg of the finals series, helping Auckland progress to the Grand Final before ultimately winning the A-League Men Championship.

=== Motherwell ===
On 15 July 2026, Girdwood-Reich joined Scottish Premiership club Motherwell F.C. for an undisclosed fee, signing a three-year contract until 2029.

== International career ==
First representation honours for Girdwood-Reich came in the COVID affected 2019 U17 FIFA World Cup. After playing in all three games in the qualifying tournament in Hanoi, the finals tournament and the World Cup itself were both cancelled due to COVID-19.

Jake's first post-COVID-19 opportunity arose in 2023, with selection for the U20 FIFA World Cup qualifying tournament in Uzbekistan at age 18, where Australia were eliminated by the hosts in the quarter-finals.

In 2024, at age 19, Girdwood-Reich was selected for the U23 Olyroos, to compete in the 2024 WAFF U-23 Championship. He was subsequently selected again for the squad that competed in the 2024 AFC U-23 Asian Cup but did not progress beyond the group stage.

== Career statistics ==
As of 21 August 2026

Club	Season	League			National cup (Note: Includes Australia Cup, U.S. Open Cup)		League cup (Note: Includes Leagues Cup, Scottish League Cup)		Other		Total	
Club	Season	Division	Apps	Goals	Apps	Goals	Apps	Goals	Apps	Goals	Apps	Goals
Sydney FC	2022–23	A-League Men	14	0	1	0	—		—		15	0
Sydney FC	2023–24	A-League Men	25	1	5	0	—		—		30	1
Sydney FC	Total		39	1	6	0	—		—		45	1
St. Louis City SC	2024	MLS	8	0	0	0	4	0	—		12	0
St. Louis City SC	2025	MLS	10	0	1	0	0	0	—		11	0
Auckland FC (loan)	2025–26	A-League Men	25	1	0	0	—		4 (Note: A-League Men Finals)	1	29	2
Auckland FC (loan)	Total		43	1	5	0	4	0	4	1	52	2
Motherwell FC	2026–27	Scottish Premiership	2	0	0	0	1	0	5 (Note: Appearances in UEFA Conference League)	0	8	0
Career total			84	2	11	0	5	0	9	1	105	3

== Honours ==
=== Player ===
Sydney FC

- Australia Cup: 2023

Australia U-23

- WAFF U-23 Championship: runner-up 2024

Auckland FC

- A-League Men Championship: 2026

Individual

- PFA A-League Team of the Season: 2023–24

== See also ==
- List of Jewish footballers
