= Felipe Gallegos =

Chilean footballer (born 1991)

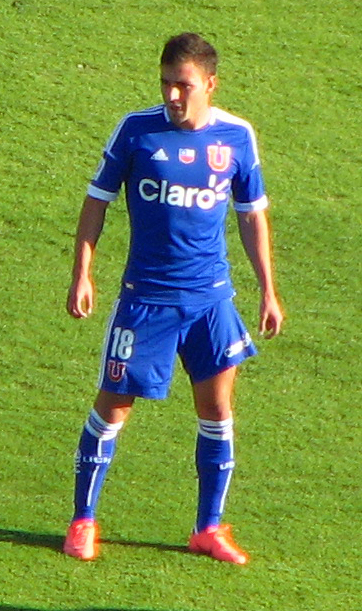
- Gallegos with Universidad de Chile in 2012

Personal information
- Full name: Luis Felipe Gallegos Leiva
- Date of birth: 3 December 1991 (age 34)
- Place of birth: Copiapó, Chile
- Height: 1.73 m (5 ft 8 in)
- Position: Midfielder

Team information
- Current team: Auckland FC
- Number: 8

Youth career
- 2004–2010: Universidad de Chile

Senior career*
Years	Team	Apps	(Gls)
2010–2013	U. de Chile	57	(8)
2012–2013	→ Union Berlin II (loan)	7	(3)
2012–2013	→ Union Berlin (loan)	2	(0)
2013–2014	→ Recreativo Huelva (loan)	20	(0)
2014–2019	Necaxa	188	(17)
2020–2021	Atlético San Luis	22	(2)
2021–2022	OFI	23	(2)
2022–2023	U. de Chile	19	(0)
2023–2024	OFI	32	(1)
2024–	Auckland FC	51	(2)

International career^{‡}
2011	Chile U20	7	(3)
- * Club domestic league appearances and goals as of 29 April 2026 ‡ National team caps and goals as of 9 February 2011

Luis Felipe Gallegos Leiva (Spanish: [ˈlwis feˈlipe ɣaˈʝeɣos ˈlejβa]; born 3 December 1991) is a Chilean professional footballer who plays as a midfielder for A-League club Auckland FC.

== Club career ==
In 2009, Gallegos was promoted to first-adult team and debuted during an unofficial friendly match against Argentinos Juniors. The incoming season, he officially debuted against O'Higgins in a 3–3 away draw. The following match he assisted to Diego Rivarola in the second goal of the 2–0 away win over Cobreloa. His first competitive goal came on 15 August 2010 against Everton de Viña del Mar in a 5–1 victory.

In mid-2012 Gallegos left the club and joined on loan to German second-tier side Union Berlin. After completing his loan spell, he moved to Spanish Liga Adelante team Recreativo de Huelva in June 2013.

In June 2014, he joined Necaxa of the Liga MX.

In August 2021, he joined the Greek club OFI, becoming the fourth Chilean to play for the club after Alejandro Hisis, Jaime Vera and Miguel Vargas.

In 2022, he returned to Universidad de Chile, ending his contract on 21 July 2023.

On 26 July 2023, Gallegos was announced at OFI on a two-year contract.

On 16 September 2024, Gallegos was announced as one of the three international visa players for Auckland FC, alongside Guillermo May and Louis Verstraete. Gallegos became the third Chilean to play in the A-League Men following Pablo Contreras and Vicente Fernández. On 5 April 2025, Gallegos scored his first goal for the club in a 1–1 draw with Western Sydney Wanderers. Gallegos scored his second goal for the club in a 1–1 draw with Adelaide United at Coopers Stadium. The second-half volley was later awarded as Auckland's Goal of the Season.

On 6 July 2026, Gallegos extended his contact with the club by one year.

== International career ==
In 2011, he was part of the South American U-20 Championship, scoring three goals in seven matches.

On 7 November 2019, he got his first call up to the Chile national team for the friendly match against Peru. However, the match was canceled due to the players decided not to play as a supporting sign to the social movement in Chile.

== Career statistics ==
=== Club ===
As of 26 August 2026

Club	Season	League			Cup (Note: Appearance(s) in DFB Pokal, Copa Chile, Copa del Rey, Copa MX, Greece Cup, & Australia Cup)		Continental		Other		Total	
Club	Season	Division	Apps	Goals	Apps	Goals	Apps	Goals	Apps	Goals	Apps	Goals
Universidad de Chile	2010	Chilean Primera División	12	2	—		0	0	—		12	2
Universidad de Chile	2011	Chilean Primera División	22	3	—		3 (Note: Appearance(s) in Copa Sudamericana)	0	—		25	3
Universidad de Chile	2012	Chilean Primera División	14	3	—		3 (Note: Appearance(s)in Copa Libertadores)	0	—		17	3
Universidad de Chile	2013	Chilean Primera División	—		3	0	—		—		3	0
Universidad de Chile	Total		48	8	3	0	6	0	—		57	8
Union Berlin II (loan)	2012–13	Regionalliga	7	3	—		—		—		7	3
Union Berlin (loan)	2012–13	2. Bundesliga	2	0	1	0	—		—		3	0
Recreativo de Huelva (loan)	2013–14	Segunda División	20	0	3	0	—		—		23	0
Necaxa	2014–15	Ascenso MX	31	1	9	2	—		—		40	3
Necaxa	2015–16	Ascenso MX	36	4	7	1	—		—		43	5
Necaxa	2016–17	Liga MX	32	4	0	0	—		—		32	4
Necaxa	2017–18	Liga MX	18	0	5	0	—		—		23	0
Necaxa	2018–19	Liga MX	29	1	2	0	—		1 (Note: Appearance(s) in Supercopa MX)	0	32	1
Necaxa	2019–20	Liga MX	18	4	0	0	—		0	0	22	4
Necaxa	Total		193	17	23	3	—		1	0	225	20
Atlético San Luis	2019–20	Liga MX	8	0	1	0	—		—		9	0
Atlético San Luis	2020–21	Liga MX	13	2	—		—		—		13	2
Atlético San Luis	Total		21	2	1	0	—		—		22	2
OFI	2021–22	Super League Greece	21	2	2	0	—		—		23	2
Universidad de Chile	2022	Chilean Primera División	16	0	5	0	—		—		21	0
Universidad de Chile	2023	Chilean Primera División	3	0	0	0	—		—		3	0
Universidad de Chile	Total		40	2	5	0	—		—		47	0
OFI	2023–24	Super League Greece	29	1	5	0	—		—		34	1
OFI	2024–25	Super League Greece	3	0	0	0	—		—		3	0
OFI	Total		32	1	5	0	—		—		37	1
Auckland FC	2024–25	A-League Men	25	1	—		—		2 (Note: Appearance(s)in A-League Men finals series)	0	27	1
Auckland FC	2025–26	A-League Men	24	1	4	0	—		0	0	28	1
Auckland FC	2026–27	A-League Men	0	0	—		0	0	1 (Note: Appearance in FIFA Intercontinental Cup)	0	1	0
Career Total			383	32	43	0	7	0	4	0	444	33

== Honours ==
Universidad de Chile

- Campeonato Nacional: 2011–A, 2011–C, 2012–A
- Copa Sudamericana: 2011

Necaxa

- Ascenso MX: Clausura 2016
- Copa MX: Clausura 2018
- Supercopa MX: 2018

Auckland FC

- A-League Premiership: 2024–25
- A-League Men Championship: 2026
