= Ryan Mackay =

New Zealand footballer (born 2007)

Personal information
- Date of birth: 30 May 2007 (age 19)
- Height: 1.90 m (6 ft 3 in)
- Position: Defender

Team information
- Current team: Denver Pioneers
- Number: 33

Youth career
- –2024: Fencibles United

College career
Years	Team	Apps	(Gls)
2026–	Denver Pioneers	14	(1)

Senior career*
Years	Team	Apps	(Gls)
2024	Fencibles United	1	(0)
2025	Auckland FC Reserves	16	(0)
2026	Auckland FC	1	(0)
- * Club domestic league appearances and goals as of 11 November 2026

Ryan Mackay (born 30 May 2007) is a New Zealand footballer who plays as a defender for Denver Pioneers at the University of Denver.

== Club career ==
=== Fencibles United ===
Mackay played his youth football for Fencibles United, before eventually playing for their first team. In 2023, Mackay was part of the Fencibles side that finished as runners-up in the New Zealand Youth National League.

=== Auckland FC ===
On 14 February 2025, Mackay was named in the inaugural Auckland FC Reserves side. On 28 February 2026, Mackay made his professional debut for Auckland FC in the A-League Men against Melbourne City.

=== Denver Pioneers ===
On 25 March 2026, Auckland FC announced the departure of Mackay for an opportunity in the United States. The University of Denver later announced that Mackay had been added to their Denver Pioneers men's soccer roster for 2026. Mackay scored his first goal for the club on 24 October in a 2–2 draw against Pacific Tigers. During the season, he made 16 appearances, starting each match at centre-back.

== Career statistics ==
=== Club ===
As of match played on 11 November 2026.

Appearances and goals by club, season and competition
Club	Season	League			Cup		Others		Total	
Club	Season	Division	Apps	Goals	Apps	Goals	Apps	Goals	Apps	Goals
Fencibles United	2024	Championship	1	0	0	0	—		1	0
Auckland FC Reserves	2025	National League	16	0	1	0	—		17	0
Auckland FC	2025–26	A-League Men	1	0	0	0	—		0	0
Denver Pioneers	2026	NCAA Division I	14	1	—		—		14	1
Career total			32	1	1	0	0	0	32	1
