= James Hilton (soccer) =

Australian football goalkeeper

James Hiton
Personal information
- Date of birth: 16 September 2002 (age 24)
- Place of birth: Manchester, England
- Height: 1.86 m (6 ft 1 in)
- Position: Goalkeeper

Team information
- Current team: Macarthur FC
- Number: 13

Youth career
- 2014–2017: Mounties Wanderers
- 2017–2020: Macarthur Rams
- 2020–2023: Marconi Stallions

Senior career*
| Years | Team | Apps | (Gls) |
| 2023–2026 | Marconi Stallions | 81 | (0) |
| 2026 | Auckland FC | 2 | (0) |
| 2026– | Macarthur FC | 0 | (0) |
- * Club domestic league appearances and goals as of 11 April 2026

James Hilton (born 16 September 2002) is an English-born Australian professional soccer player who plays as a goalkeeper for A-League Men club Macarthur FC.

== Early life ==
Hilton was born on 16 September 2002 in Manchester, England, and moved to Sydney in 2008 at the age of six. He is of Irish descent.

Hilton spent time with Mounties Wanderers and Macarthur Rams before joining Marconi Stallions in 2020.

== Club career ==
=== Marconi Stallions ===
Hilton made his senior debut for Marconi Stallions during the 2023 National Premier Leagues NSW season.

He established himself as a regular starter during the 2024 season. Marconi finished second in the regular season, before going on to win the 2024 National Premier Leagues NSW Championship.

In 2025, Hilton was named the NPL NSW Men’s Goalkeeper of the Year, having recorded 12 clean sheets in 32 appearances during the season. Hilton featured for Marconi in the inaugural Australian Championship. In a quarter-final clash against APIA Leichhardt FC, Hilton delivered a standout performance in a penalty shootout, saving 3 spot kicks before converting the decisive penalty himself to secure progression to the semi-final. Hilton continued in goal during the semi-final, keeping a clean sheet in a 1–0 victory over Moreton City Excelsior FC, before losing 2–0 to South Melbourne in the final.

=== Auckland FC ===
On 6 February, Hilton joined Auckland FC on a contract until the end of the season as an injury replacement for backup goalkeeper Oliver Sail. Hilton made his professional debut in a 1–1 draw with Adelaide United at Hindmarsh Stadium, coming on as a late injury replacement for Michael Woud, who picked up a groin injury during the warm-up.

On 4 June 2026, the club announced Hilton's departure following the conclusion of his contract. Hilton made two appearances during his time at Auckland.

=== Macarthur FC ===
On 18 June, Hilton joined fellow A-League Men side Macarthur FC ahead of the 2026–27 A-League Men season. On 14 October, less than a week before the start of the 2026–27 season, it was reported that Hilton had sustained a shoulder dislocation during training. His return-to-play timeline was initially unconfirmed. On 27 October, Hilton announced through his personal Instagram account that he would miss the remainder of the season.

== Personal life ==
Hilton holds a qualification in Molecular Genetics and Disease after graduating from the University of New South Wales with a double major degree.

He is a Manchester City supporter and began supporting Marconi Stallions after moving from England, stating: "When I came over from the UK in 2008, I was looking for a team to support and Marconi had the same sky blue kit as Man City."

== Career statistics ==
=== Club ===
As of 6 April 2026

| Club | Season | League | | | Cup (Note: Includes appearances in the Australia Cup) | | Other | | Total | |
| Club | Season | Division | Apps | Goals | Apps | Goals | Apps | Goals | Apps | Goals |
|---|---|---|---|---|---|---|---|---|---|---|
| Marconi Stallions | 2023 | NPL NSW | 17 | 0 | 0 | 0 | – | | 17 | 0 |
| Marconi Stallions | 2024 | NPL NSW | 32 | 0 | 0 | 0 | – | | 32 | 0 |
| Marconi Stallions | 2025 | NPL NSW | 32 | 0 | 0 | 0 | – | | 32 | 0 |
| Marconi Stallions | Total | | 81 | 0 | 0 | 0 | – | | 81 | 0 |
| Auckland FC | 2025–26 | A-League Men | 2 | 0 | 0 | 0 | 0 (Note: Appearances in A-League Finals) | 0 | 2 | 0 |
| Macarthur FC | 2026–27 | A-League Men | 0 | 0 | 0 | 0 | 0 | 0 | 0 | 0 |
| Macarthur FC | Total | | 2 | 0 | 0 | 0 | 0 | 0 | 2 | 0 |
| Career total | | | 83 | 0 | 0 | 0 | 0 | 0 | 83 | 0 |

== Honours ==
Individual

- NSW 2025 Men’s Goalkeeper of the Year

Auckland FC

- A-League Men Championship: 2026
