= Jesse Randall =

New Zealand footballer (born 2002)

- Randall with Dundee United in 2026

Personal information
- Full name: Jesse Carmichael Randall
- Date of birth: 19 August 2002 (age 24)
- Place of birth: Wellington, New Zealand
- Height: 1.76 m (5 ft 9 in)
- Position: Forward

Team information
- Current team: Dundee United
- Number: 21

Youth career
- –2017: Miramar Rangers

College career
Years	Team	Apps	(Gls)
2021	Northern Kentucky Norse	17	(10)

Senior career*
Years	Team	Apps	(Gls)
2018	Island Bay United	16	(15)
2019–2021	North Wellington	44	(41)
2019–2020	→ Tasman United (loan)	14	(3)
2020–2021	→ Hawke's Bay United (loan)	6	(4)
2022	Wellington Olympic	22	(17)
2023	Charleston Battery	5	(0)
2024	Wellington Olympic	8	(7)
2024–2026	Auckland FC	50	(12)
2026–	Dundee United	13	(4)

International career^{‡}
2019	New Zealand U-17	6	(1)
2023–	New Zealand U-23	5	(4)
2024–	New Zealand	19	(5)
Medal record
Men's football
Representing New Zealand
OFC Nations Cup
Winner	2024 Fiji/Vanuatu
- * Club domestic league appearances and goals as of 22 November 2026 ‡ National team caps and goals as of 12 November 2026

Jesse Carmichael Randall (born 19 August 2002) is a New Zealand professional footballer who plays as a forward for Scottish Premiership club Dundee United and the New Zealand national team.

== Club career ==
=== Early career ===
Randall began his senior career in New Zealand, playing regional football with Island Bay United in 2018, where he scored 15 goals in 16 appearances. He moved to North Wellington in 2019, scoring 41 goals in 44 league matches, and spent time on loan with Tasman United and Hawke's Bay United during the 2019–20 and 2020–21 seasons respectively. In 2022, Randall signed for Wellington Olympic, where he scored 17 goals in 22 appearances in the National League.

In January 2023, it was reported that Randall was training with League One side Barnsley on a week-long trial. In March 2023, Randall moved to the United States, signing with USL Championship side Charleston Battery. He made seven appearances for the club before returning to New Zealand later that year, rejoining Wellington Olympic and scoring seven goals in eight matches in the 2024 season.

=== Auckland FC ===
On 29 May 2024, Randall was announced as one of the first signings for Auckland FC's inaugural season. He was predominantly deployed as a striker alongside Guillermo May during the 2024–25 campaign. Randall scored his first goal for the club in a 6–1 win over Wellington Phoenix and went on to record three goals and one assist in his debut A-League Men season.

Randall later scored three goals in four Australia Cup appearances after being shifted to a left-wing role, including a goal after just 30 seconds in a 4–0 victory over Gold Coast Knights. He scored his first goal of the following A-League season in a 1–0 win over Western Sydney Wanderers. Randall finished the A-League season with nine goals and six assists, including two goals and one assist in Auckland's 5–0 win over Wellington Phoenix at Sky Stadium. He was awarded both Auckland FC Members’ Player of the Season and the club’s A-League Men Players’ Player of the Season. Randall was later included in the Professional Footballers Australia (PFA) A-League Team of the Season, alongside teammates Sam Cosgrove and Francis de Vries.

Randall recorded two assists during Auckland FC's run in the finals series. He assisted Guillermo May from a corner in a 1–1 draw with Melbourne City in the elimination final, a match Auckland later won on penalties. Randall also assisted Logan Rogerson for Auckland's third goal in a 3–0 win over Adelaide United in the second leg of the semi-finals, sealing a 4–1 aggregate victory and securing the club's first appearance in the A-League Grand Final. Randall's 50th and final A-League Men appearance for Auckland came in the 2026 A-League Men Grand Final, a 1–0 victory over Sydney FC, as Auckland became the first New Zealand club to win the A-League Men Championship. Randall started all 30 matches during the season, scoring nine goals and recording six assists. His departure was confirmed by Auckland FC on 28 May 2026.

=== Dundee United ===
On 30 January 2026, Dundee United announced that they had signed Randall on a pre-contract agreement. He agreed to a two-year deal, with the club holding an option to extend the contract by a further year.

Randall made his debut for the club in a 3–0 victory over Arbroath in the Scottish League Cup. He registered his first assist in the following match, setting up Australian forward Lachlan Rose for his second goal in a 4–0 win over Spartans FC. Randall once again assisted Lachlan Rose, in the opening round of the Scottish Premiership during a 1–1 draw with Rangers.

Randall scored his first goal for the club in a 4–0 league win over Kilmarnock at Rugby Park.

== International career ==
=== Youth ===
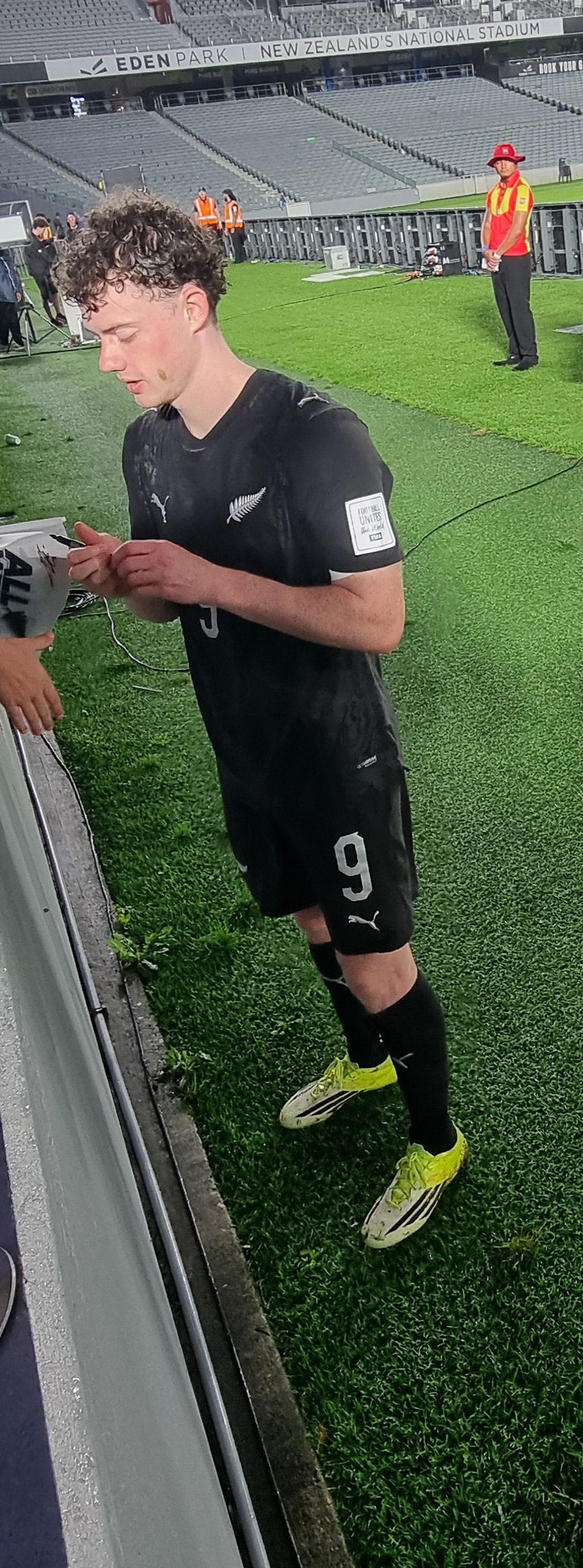
Randall signing autographs following a match for the All Whites in March 2026

Randall has represented New Zealand U-17 and New Zealand U-23 at youth level. He was part of the New Zealand squad at the 2024 Summer Olympics, scoring against the United States during the tournament.

=== Senior ===
On 18 June 2024 Randall made his debut for the New Zealand national football team during a 3–1 win over the Solomon Islands in the 2024 OFC Men's Nations Cup. He scored his first international goal on 30 June 2024 in a 3–0 win over Vanuatu in the final, also providing an assist in the match.

Randall featured for New Zealand during their 2026 FIFA World Cup qualification campaign. He was part of the squad during matches that contributed to New Zealand securing qualification.

On 30 March 2026, Randall scored his second senior international goal in a 4–1 victory over Chile during the FIFA Series. The result marked New Zealand's first win over a South American (CONMEBOL) opponent.

On 14 May, Randall was named in the 26-man New Zealand squad for the 2026 FIFA World Cup. Randall made his World Cup debut in New Zealand's opening match, a 2–2 draw against Iran, coming on for Sarpreet Singh late in the match.

== Career statistics ==
=== Club ===
As of match played 19 September 2026

Club	Season	League			National Cup (Note: Includes appearances in the Chatham Cup, U.S. Open Cup, and Australia Cup)		League Cup (Note: Includes appearances in the Scottish League Cup)		Other		Total	
Club	Season	Division	Apps	Goals	Apps	Goals	Apps	Goals	Apps	Goals	Apps	Goals
Island Bay United	2018	Central League	16	15	0	0	–		–		16	15
Tasman United (loan)	2019–20	Premiership	14	3	–		–		–		14	3
Hawke's Bay United FC (loan)	2020–21	Premiership	6	4	–		–		–		6	4
North Wellington	2021	National League	10	8	2	2	–		–		12	10
Wellington Olympic	2022	National League	22	17	6	5	–		–		28	22
Charleston Battery	2023	USL Championship	5	0	2	0	–		0	0	7	0
Wellington Olympic	2024	National League	8	7	1	0	–		2 (Note: Appearances in OFC Champions League)	1	11	8
Auckland FC	2024–25	A-League Men	20	3	—		—		2 (Note: Appearances in A-League Finals)	0	20	3
Auckland FC	2025–26	A-League Men	26	9	4	3	—		4	0	33	12
Auckland FC	Total		46	12	4	3	0	0	6	0	53	15
Dundee United	2026–27	Scottish Premiership	7	2	0	0	3	0	—		10	2
Career total			135	68	15	10	3	0	7	1	157	78

=== International ===
As of match played 12 November 2026

Appearances and goals by national team and year
National team	Year	Apps	Goals
New Zealand	2024	4	1
New Zealand	2025	3	0
New Zealand	2026	12	4
Total		19	5

Scores and results list New Zealand's goal tally first, score column indicates score after each Randall goal.

List of international goals scored by Jesse Randall
No.	Date	Venue	Opponent	Score	Result	Competition
1	30 June 2024	VFF Freshwater Stadium, Port Vila, Vanuatu	Vanuatu	2–0	3–0	2024 OFC Men's Nations Cup
2	30 March 2026	Eden Park, Auckland, New Zealand	Chile	3–0	4–1	2026 FIFA Series
3	24 September 2026	Tongliang Long Stadium, Chongqing, China	Palestine	2–1	2–2	Friendly
4	12 November 2026	Go Media Stadium, Auckland, New Zealand	India	2–0	5–0	Friendly
5	12 November 2026	Go Media Stadium, Auckland, New Zealand	India	3–0	5–0	Friendly

== Honours ==
Auckland FC

- A-League Premiership: 2024–25
- A-League Men Championship: 2026

New Zealand

- OFC Nations Cup: 2024

Individual

- PFA Team of the Season: 2025–26
