= Aaron Calver =

Australian footballer

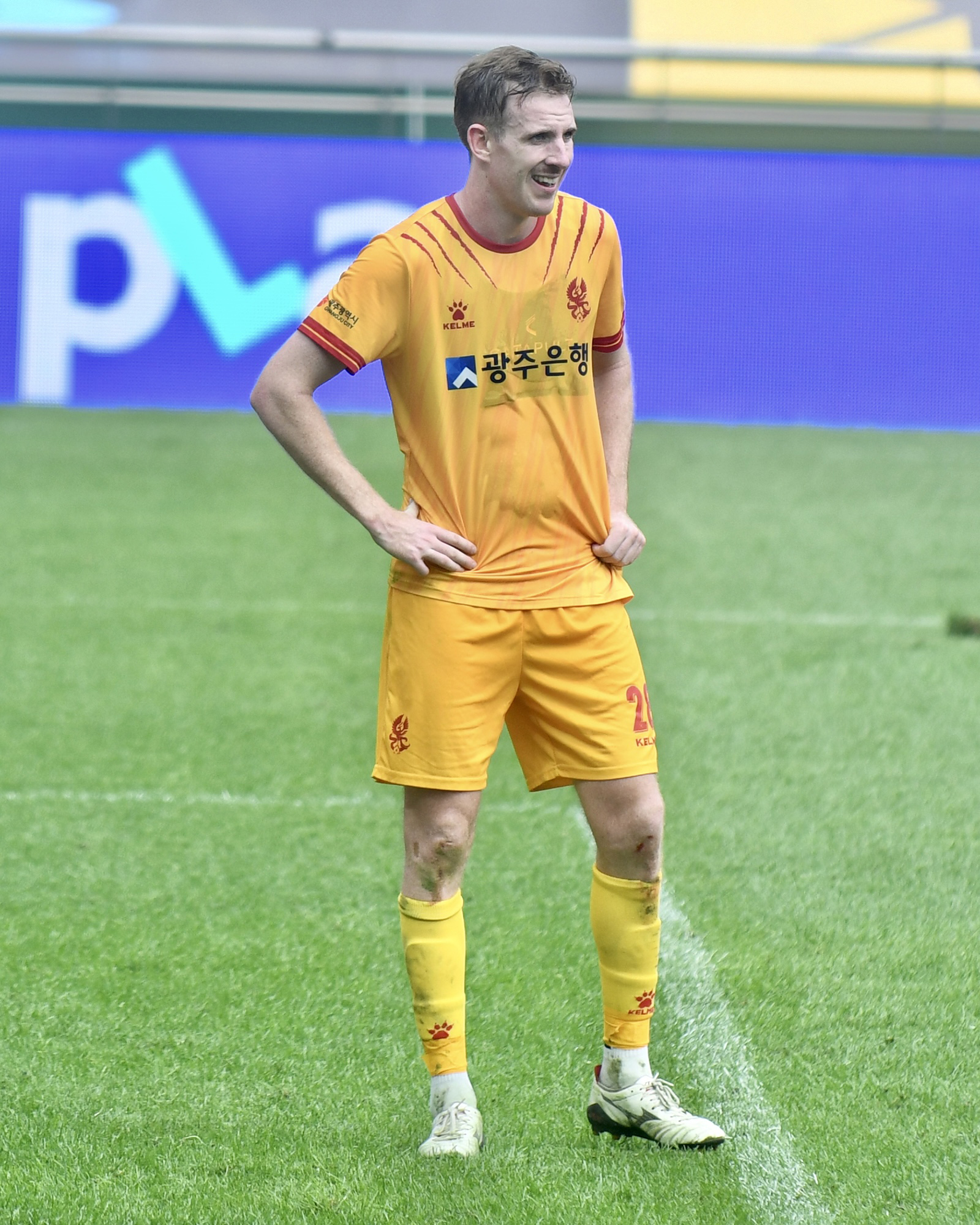
- Calver with Gwangju FC in 2023

Personal information
- Full name: Aaron Robert Calver
- Date of birth: 12 January 1996 (age 30)
- Place of birth: Caringbah, Australia
- Height: 1.86 m (6 ft 1 in)
- Position: Central defender

Team information
- Current team: Auckland FC
- Number: 28

Youth career
- Helensburgh Thistles
- Illawarra Metropolitan
- Wollongong Wolves
- 2012: NSWIS
- 2012: Sydney FC

Senior career*
Years	Team	Apps	(Gls)
2012–2019	Sydney FC	50	(3)
2019–2021	Western United	34	(1)
2021–2022	Perth Glory	10	(0)
2022–2023	Gwangju FC	45	(3)
2024–2025	Daejeon Hana Citizen	20	(0)
2025–2026	Seoul E-Land	3	(0)
2026	Hume City	20	(2)
2026–	Auckland FC	0	(0)

International career^{‡}
2011–2012	Australia U17	13	(2)
- * Club domestic league appearances and goals as of 24 July 2026 ‡ National team caps and goals as of 8 March 2016

Aaron Robert Calver (born 12 January 1996) is an Australian professional football (soccer) player who plays as a defender for Auckland FC in A-League Men.

== Early life ==
Calver attended Heathcote High School in southern Sydney.

== Career ==
On 30 December 2012, Calver was called up to the first team for Sydney's New Year's Eve clash against Adelaide United. Calver was substituted on in only the 14th minute of his sides 3–0 loss after Adam Griffiths sustained a leg injury. Aged only sixteen (and having become Sydney's second youngest ever player, behind Terry Antonis), Calver was soon in contention for a position in the starting lineup, with several other defenders in the squad injured.

In the 2014–15 season, Calver spent time playing at right-back, as well as his more customary centre-back role. In February 2015, Calver was slapped by a Western Sydney Wanderers fan after watching the Sydney Derby; he declined to press charges from the incident. In April 2015, Calver signed a new two-year deal with Sydney.

Calver signed with new side Western United for the 2019–20 A-League season. After two seasons with Western United Calver was released.

On 27 March 2022, Calver joined Gwangju FC of K League 2.

Calver transferred to K League 1 side Daejeon Hana Citizen ahead of the 2024 season.

On 24 July 2026, Calver joined A-League Men club Auckland FC ahead of the 2026–27 season, returning to the league for the first time in 4 years.

== Career statistics ==
=== Club ===
As of match played on 26 August 2026.

Club	Season	League			Cup (Note: Includes appearances in the Australia Cup, Korea Cup,)		Continental		Total	
Club	Season	Division	Apps	Goals	Apps	Goals	Apps	Goals	Apps	Goals
Sydney FC	2012–13	A-League	3	0	0	0	—		3	0
Sydney FC	2013–14	A-League	6	0	0	0	—		6	0
Sydney FC	2014–15	A-League	9	0	0	0	—		9	0
Sydney FC	2015–16	A-League	4	0	2	0	3 (Note: Appearances in AFC Champions League Elite)	0	9	0
Sydney FC	2016–17	A-League	6	0	0	0	—		6	0
Sydney FC	2017–18	A-League	1	0	0	0	4	0	5	0
Sydney FC	2018–19	A-League	21	3	3	0	3	0	27	3
Sydney FC	Total		50	3	5	0	10	0	65	3
Western United	2019–20	A-League	16	1	0	0	—		16	1
Western United	2020–21	A-League	18	0	0	0	—		18	0
Western United	Total		34	1	0	0	0	0	34	1
Perth Glory	2021–22	A-League Men	10	0	0	0	—		10	0
Gwangju FC	2022	K League 2	25	3	1	0	—		26	3
Gwangju FC	2023	K League 1	20	0	2	0	—		22	0
Gwangju FC	Total		45	3	3	0	0	0	48	3
Daejeon Hana Citizen	2024	K League 1	19	0	0	0	—		19	0
Daejeon Hana Citizen	2025	K League 1	1	0	0	0	—		1	0
Daejeon Hana Citizen	Total		20	0	0	0	0	0	20	0
Seoul E-Land	2025	K League 2	3	0	0	0	—		3	0
Hume City	2026	NPL Victoria	5	0	0	0	—		5	0
Auckland FC	2026–27	A-League Men	0	0	—		1 (Note: Appearance in FIFA Intercontinental Cup)	0	1	0
Career total			167	7	8	0	11	0	186	7

== Honours ==
Sydney

- National Youth League Premiership: 2013–14
- A-League Premiership: 2016–17, 2017–2018
- A-League Championship: 2018–19

Gwangju

- K League 2: 2022
