= Francis de Vries =

New Zealand footballer

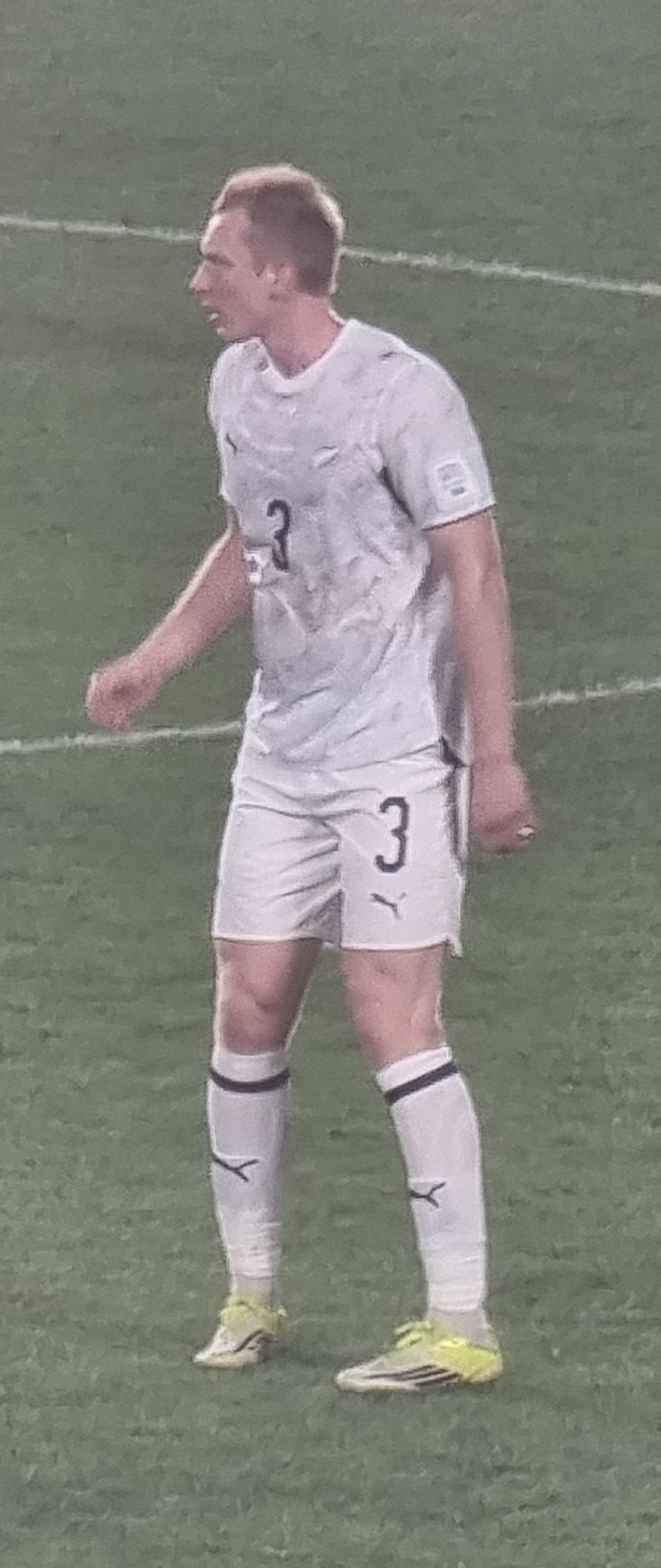
- De Vries playing for the All Whites in March 2026.

Personal information
- Full name: Francis de Vries
- Date of birth: 28 November 1994 (age 31)
- Place of birth: Christchurch, New Zealand
- Height: 1.88 m (6 ft 2 in)
- Position: Defender

Team information
- Current team: Auckland FC
- Number: 15

Youth career
- –2011: Canterbury United
- 2012: FC Basel

College career
Years	Team	Apps	(Gls)
2013–2016	Saint Francis Red Flash	79	(15)

Senior career*
Years	Team	Apps	(Gls)
2011–2012	Canterbury United	1	(0)
2014–2016	Michigan Bucks	32	(2)
2017	Whitecaps FC 2	20	(0)
2017–2018	Canterbury United	15	(1)
2018	Nyköpings BIS	11	(0)
2019–2022	IFK Värnamo	97	(5)
2023–2024	Eastern Suburbs	40	(7)
2024–	Auckland FC	50	(3)

International career^{‡}
2021–	New Zealand	22	(1)
- * Club domestic league appearances and goals as of 1 April 2026 ‡ National team caps and goals as of 27 June 2026

Francis de Vries (Dutch: [ˈfrɑn.sɪs də ˈvrizə]; born 28 November 1994) is a New Zealand professional footballer who plays for A-League club Auckland FC and the New Zealand national team.

== Club career ==
=== Canterbury United ===
De Vries played for Canterbury United in his youth. He played in the team which won the ASB Premiership Youth League in 2011.

=== FC Basel ===
De Vries was initially scouted to attend the APFA Academy in Christchurch, New Zealand, under the guidance of professional coaches Giovani Fernandes and Jess Ibrom. The academy had a direct relationship with Chelsea FC as well as a number of professional clubs all around the World including FC Basel in Switzerland. In 2012, De Vries would sign a six-month contract with their Under-18s side.

=== Saint Francis University ===
Following his release by Basel, de Vries opted to move to the United States to play college soccer at Saint Francis University, where he played for four years and made 79 appearances, scoring 15 goals.

While at college, de Vries played with Premier Development League side Michigan Bucks.

=== Vancouver Whitecaps FC 2 ===
On 13 January 2017, de Vries was selected in the second round (29th overall) of the 2017 MLS SuperDraft by Vancouver Whitecaps FC. He signed to Whitecaps FC 2 on 16 March 2017.

=== Canterbury United FC ===
On 24 November 2017, de Vries signed with ISPS Handa Premiership side Canterbury United FC.

=== Nyköpings BIS ===
On 21 July 2018, de Vries signed with Nyköpings BIS in the Division 1 Norra.

=== IFK Värnamo ===
In January 2019, de Vries joined Division 1 Södra side IFK Värnamo. He played a key part in his club's consecutive promotions to the Allsvenskan and appeared in their first eleven top-flight games, but suffered a severe anterior cruciate ligament injury in July 2022 and returned to New Zealand to recover.

=== Eastern Suburbs ===
In 2023 following his return from injury, de Vries signed with Semi-Professional side Eastern Suburbs in the New Zealand Northern League.

=== Auckland FC ===
On 30 May 2024, de Vries joined Auckland FC as one of 4 inaugural sigings.

On 30 November, de Vries scored his first A-League goal in a 2–0 win over the Newcastle Jets. He later won the Members' Player of the Season award for the 2024–25 season. De Vries would feature in Auckland FC's first 50 matches, becoming the first player to play 50 matches for the club, before suffering a calf injury which ruled him out for 6 weeks.

== International career ==
Born in New Zealand, de Vries is of Dutch and Swiss descent. On 16 November 2021, de Vries made his international debut for New Zealand as a 95th-minute substitute in a friendly match against The Gambia. De Vries scored his first goal for the All Whites in a World Cup qualifying match against Samoa, an 8–0 win at Go Media Stadium.

On 14 May 2026, de Vries was named in the 26-man New Zealand squad for the 2026 FIFA World Cup.

== Career statistics ==
=== Club ===
Appearances and goals by club, season and competition
Club	Season	League			Cup (Note: Includes appearances in the Chatham Cup, Svenska Cupen, and Australia Cup)		Continental		Other		Total	
Club	Season	Division	Apps	Goals	Apps	Goals	Apps	Goals	Apps	Goals	Apps	Goals
Canterbury United	2011–12	Premiership	1	0	—		—		—		1	0
Vancouver Whitecaps FC 2	2017	USL	20	0	—		—		—		20	0
Canterbury United	2017–18	Premiership	15	1	—		—		—		15	1
Nyköpings BIS	2018	Division 1 Norra	11	0	1	0	—		—		12	0
IFK Värnamo	2019	Division 1 Södra	29	2	5	0	—		—		34	2
IFK Värnamo	2020	Division 1 Södra	29	2	0	0	—		—		29	2
IFK Värnamo	2021	Superettan	28	1	3	0	—		—		31	1
IFK Värnamo	2022	Allsvenskan	11	0	0	0	—		—		11	0
IFK Värnamo	Total		97	5	8	0	0	0	0	0	105	5
Eastern Suburbs	2023	National League	30	5	0	0	—		—		30	5
Eastern Suburbs	2024	National League	12	1	2	1	—		—		14	2
Eastern Suburbs	Total		42	6	2	1	0	0	0	0	44	7
Auckland FC	2024–25	A-League Men	26	2	—		—		2 (Note: Appearances in A-League Finals)	0	28	2
Auckland FC	2025–26	A-League Men	22	1	4	0	—		3	0	29	1
Auckland FC	2026–27	A-League Men	0	0	—		1 (Note: Appearance in FIFA Intercontinental Cup)	0	0	0	1	0
Auckland FC	Total		48	3	4	0	1	0	5	0	58	3
Career total			223	15	14	1	1	0	5	0	243	16

=== International ===
No.	Date	Venue	Opponent	Score	Result	Competition
1.	18 November 2024	Mount Smart Stadium, Auckland, New Zealand	Samoa	6–0	8–0	2026 FIFA World Cup qualification

== Honours ==
IFK Värnamo

- Superettan: 2021

Auckland FC

- A-League Premiership: 2024–25
- A-League Men Championship: 2026

Individual

- A-League Men Player of the Month: December 2024, December 2025
- Auckland FC Members' Player of the Season: 2024–25
- A-League Men Fan Player of the Year: 2024–25
- PFA Team of the Season: 2024–25
