= Michael Woud =

New Zealand footballer (born 1999)

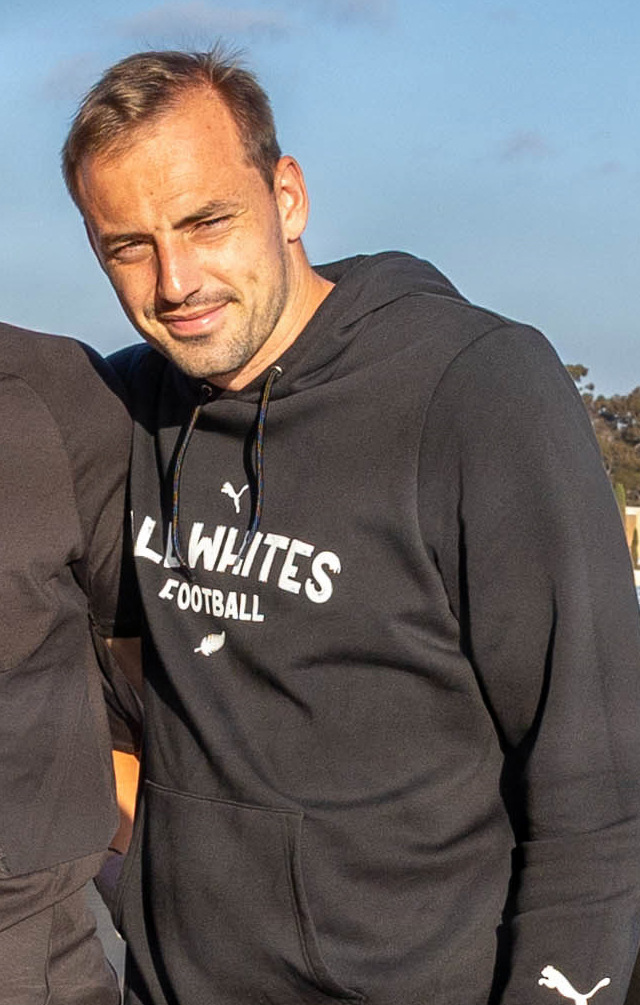
- Woud in 2026

Personal information
- Full name: Michael Cornelis Woud
- Date of birth: 16 January 1999 (age 27)
- Place of birth: Auckland, New Zealand
- Height: 1.96 m (6 ft 5 in)
- Position: Goalkeeper

Team information
- Current team: Auckland FC
- Number: 1

Youth career
- –2014: Waitakere City
- 2015: Bay Olympic
- 2015–2018: Sunderland

Senior career*
Years	Team	Apps	(Gls)
2015–2018	Sunderland	0	(0)
2018–2021	Willem II	5	(0)
2020–2021	→ Almere City (loan)	21	(0)
2021	Almere City	29	(0)
2022–2024	Kyoto Sanga	0	(0)
2023	→ Ventforet Kofu (loan)	1	(0)
2024–	Auckland FC	28	(0)

International career^{‡}
2015	New Zealand U17	9	(0)
2017–2019	New Zealand U20	12	(0)
2021	New Zealand U23	3	(0)
2018–	New Zealand	6	(0)
- * Club domestic league appearances and goals as of 23 May 2026 ‡ National team caps and goals as of 2 July 2024

Michael Cornelis Woud (Dutch: [ʋʌut]; born 16 January 1999) is a New Zealand professional footballer who plays as a goalkeeper for A-League club Auckland FC and the New Zealand national team.

== Club career ==
=== Sunderland ===
Woud first signed a contract to play for Sunderland, but only played for their academy teams. After the contract termination of fellow goalkeeper Mika, Woud acted for a short time as third-choice goalkeeper at the club; following Sunderland's relegation to League One, Woud was one of four goalkeepers training with the first team.

=== Willem II ===
On 14 July 2018, with a year remaining on his Sunderland contract, Woud signed a two-year deal with Willem II in the Eredivisie for an undisclosed fee.

Woud made his professional debut on 30 March 2019, in a 3–2 win against Fortuna Sittard.

On 1 July 2020, Woud moved to Eerste Divisie club, Almere City, on a 1-year loan. On 26 January 2021, the loan was made permanent, with Woud signing a deal until June 2024.

=== Kyoto Sanga ===
On 4 January 2022, Woud signed with Kyoto Sanga in Japan.

=== Ventforet Kofu (loan) ===
On 16 August 2023, Woud signs for Ventforet Kofu on loan transfer for the remainder of 2023 J2 League season.

=== Auckland FC ===
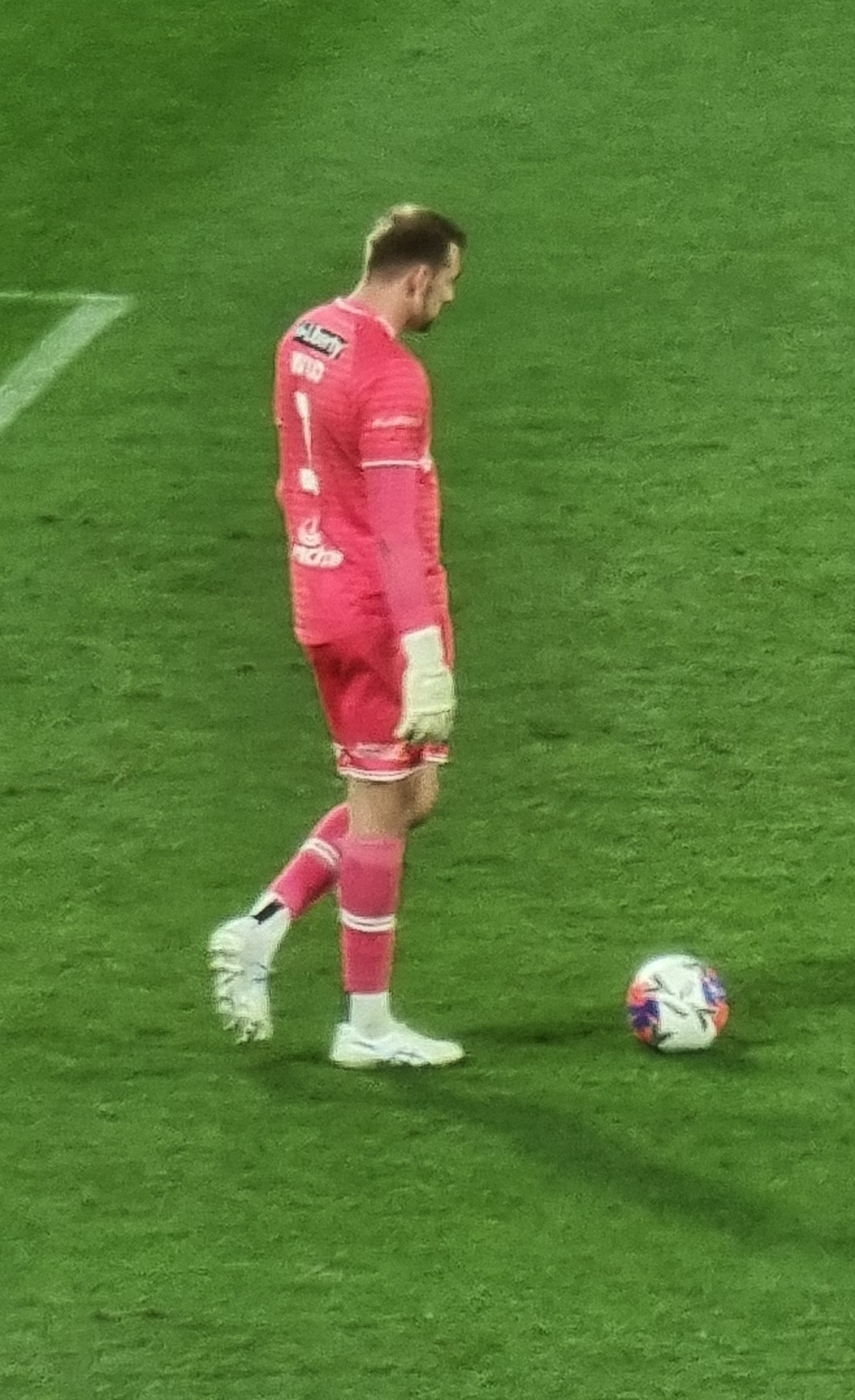
Woud playing for Auckland FC in 2025

On 30 May 2024, Woud was announced as one of Auckland FC's first four signings. During the 2024–25 season, Woud was the second choice goalkeeper behind Bournemouth loanee Alex Paulsen and did not make a single appearance.

Woud made his Auckland FC debut in the Australia Cup Round of 32, keeping a clean sheet in a 4–0 win over Gold Coast Knights. He made his A-League debut in a 0–0 draw with Melbourne Victory.

After a run of errors, culminating in spilling the ball for a late equaliser in a 2–2 draw against the Central Coast Mariners, Woud was benched the following game to make way for Oliver Sail to debut against his former club Perth Glory. However, he was substituted on with the score at 0–1 after Sail ruptured a tendon in his leg, and Auckland FC would go on to lose the match 2–1. Woud went on to remain unbeaten with Auckland FC during the month of February, keeping three clean sheets, including a dominant 5–0 win over Wellington Phoenix in the New Zealand Derby.

Woud made his first A-League Men finals appearance in Auckland FC's elimination final against Melbourne City. With the match level at 1–1 after extra time, it was decided by a penalty shootout. After the opening six penalties were converted, Woud saved Nathaniel Atkinson's spot kick, allowing Dan Hall to score the decisive penalty and send Auckland through. It was Auckland FC's first A-League Men Finals penalty shootout, and the second shootout victory of Woud's season, having also helped the club defeat Sydney FC on penalties in the Australia Cup. Woud played the full 90 minutes in Auckland FC's first A-League Men Grand Final, keeping a clean sheet in a 1–0 win over Sydney FC as Auckland FC were crowned 2026 A-League Men Champions.

On 9 June, Woud signed a contract extension with an undisclosed length.

== International career ==
Woud competed for New Zealand in both the 2015 FIFA U-17 World Cup and the 2017 FIFA U-20 World Cup, starring in the latter, but being knocked out in the round of 16 on both occasions. He received his first callup to the New Zealand senior team for a friendly against Japan in October 2017, and made his first appearance in the 2018 Intercontinental Cup in a 2–1 win over India.

Woud remains eligible for both New Zealand and the Netherlands. In August 2018, Woud was called up to the Netherlands under-20 national team for a friendly against Portugal; however, he rejected this offer in order to further his national career with New Zealand.

Woud played for the New Zealand under-20 football team in the 2019 FIFA U-20 World Cup. In the round of 16 following a 1–1 draw with Colombia after extra time, Woud made 3 straight saves in the penalty shootout. However, following the third save, the referee ruled that he moved off his line too early and ordered a retake. Colombia went on to win the penalty shootout and advance to the next round.

Woud was called up to play for the New Zealand under-23 football team at the 2020 Summer Olympics in Tokyo. Playing in all three pool games, Woud helped the team pickup their first win at the Olympics as well as qualify for the first time to the knockout stage.

Woud received his first call-up to the All Whites since 2023 following a good run of form, for the upcoming FIFA Series matches against the Finland and Chile. On 14 May 2026, Woud was named in the 26-man New Zealand squad for the 2026 FIFA World Cup as the third choice keeper, behind Alex Paulsen and Max Crocombe.

== Career statistics ==
As of match played 26 August 2026

Club	Season	League			National Cup (Note: Includes appearances in the KNVB Cup, J.League Cup, Emperor's Cup, and Australia Cup)		Other		Total	
Club	Season	Division	Apps	Goals	Apps	Goals	Apps	Goals	Apps	Goals
Willem II	2018–19	Eredivisie	4	0	0	0	—		4	0
Willem II	2019–20	Eredivisie	1	0	0	0	—		1	0
Willem II	Total		50	0	2	0	1	0	53	0
Almere City	2020–21	Eerste Divisie	38	0	1	0	1 (Note: Appearance in Eredivisie European play-offs)	0	40	0
Almere City	2021–22	Eerste Divisie	12	0	1	0	—		13	0
Almere City	Total		50	0	2	0	1	0	53	0
Kyoto Sanga	2022	J.League	0	0	7	0	—		7	0
Kyoto Sanga	2023	J.League	0	0	1	0	—		1	0
Kyoto Sanga	Total		1	0	8	0	4	0	13	0
Ventforet Kofu	2023	J2 League	1	0	0	0	4 (Note: Appearances in AFC Champions League Elite)	0	5	0
Auckland FC	2024–25	A-League Men	0	0	—		0	0	0	0
Auckland FC	2025–26	A-League Men	24	0	4	0	4 (Note: Appearances in A-League Finals)	0	32	0
Auckland FC	2026–27	A-League Men	0	0	0	0	1 (Note: Appearance in FIFA Intercontinental Cup)	0	1	0
Auckland FC	Total		24	0	4	0	4	0	33	0
Career total			80	0	14	0	9	0	104	0

== Honours ==
Auckland FC

- A-League Premiership: 2024–25
- A-League Men Championship: 2026

New Zealand U17

- OFC U-17 Championship: 2015

New Zealand U20

- OFC U-20 Championship: 2016

Individual

- Golden Gloves: 2016 OFC U-20 Championship
