= Nando Pijnaker =

New Zealand footballer (born 1999)

Personal information
- Full name: Nando Zen Pijnaker
- Date of birth: 25 February 1999 (age 27)
- Place of birth: Brummen, Netherlands
- Height: 1.91 m (6 ft 3 in)
- Position: Centre back

Team information
- Current team: Auckland FC
- Number: 4

Youth career
- –2014: Ngongotaha

Senior career*
Years	Team	Apps	(Gls)
2014	Ngongotaha		(6)
2015–2019	Western Suburbs	20	(1)
2018–2019	Eastern Suburbs	16	(1)
2019	Torslanda IK	14	(0)
2020	Grasshopper	2	(0)
2020–2022	Rio Ave B	11	(0)
2020–2022	Rio Ave	0	(0)
2021	→ Helsingør (loan)	1	(0)
2022	→ Sligo Rovers (loan)	31	(1)
2023–2024	Sligo Rovers	46	(0)
2024–	Auckland FC	44	(4)
2025	→ Auckland FC Reserves	1	(0)

International career^{‡}
2019	New Zealand U20	4	(0)
2021	New Zealand U23	1	(0)
2021	New Zealand Olympic (O.P.)	4	(0)
2019–	New Zealand	25	(0)
- * Club domestic league appearances and goals as of 11 February 2026 ‡ National team caps and goals as of 6 June 2026

Nando Zen Pijnaker (Dutch: [ˈnɑndo zɛn ˈpɛi̯.nɑ.kər]; born 25 February 1999) is a professional footballer who plays as a centre back for A-League Men club Auckland FC. Born in the Netherlands, he plays for the New Zealand national team.

== Early life ==
Pijnaker was born in the Netherlands and migrated to New Zealand with his family at the age of three, settling in Rotorua. He attended and played football for Western Heights High School and also began playing for local club Ngongotaha, making his first-team debut at the age of 15.

== Club career ==
=== Western Suburbs ===
In 2015 Pijnaker moved to Wellington to join the Olé Football Academy, then run by Declan Edge, and played for affiliated club Western Suburbs in the Central League that features teams from the lower half of the North Island of New Zealand. Pijnaker was part of the team to win the Central League in 2017 and reach the final of the 2018 Chatham Cup.

=== Eastern Suburbs ===
Through the Olé Academy partnership, Pijnaker signed for Olé affiliate Eastern Suburbs, winning the ISPS Handa Premiership and qualifying for the OFC Champions League.

=== Torslanda IK ===
Following the conclusion of New Zealand's 2019 FIFA U-20 World Cup campaign, Pijnaker joined his former coach Declan Edge at Swedish Division 2 Norra Götaland side Torslanda IK, a club run in partnership with the Olé Academy. He made his debut on 15 June 2019, starting in a 3–2 loss to Stenungsunds IF.

=== Grasshopper ===
After a 10 day trial, Pijnaker signed in January 2020 with Swiss Challenge League club Grasshopper, joining international teammate Max Mata. He made two appearances for the club.

=== Rio Ave ===
After the short stint at Grasshoper, Pijnaker signed a four-year deal with Portuguese Primeira Liga club Rio Ave on 30 August 2020. On 31 August 2021, Pijnaker was loaned out to Danish 1st Division club FC Helsingør for the rest of 2021.

=== Sligo Rovers ===
On 8 February 2022, Pijnaker joined League of Ireland Premier Division side Sligo Rovers on a season-long loan deal. On 21 December 2022, his transfer was made permanent. On 1 April 2024, Pijnaker suffered broken ribs in a collision with his own goalkeeper Ed McGinty in a 3–0 loss away to St Patrick's Athletic. On 1 September 2024, it was announced that Pijnaker had left the club to return closer to home.

=== Auckland FC ===
On 3 September 2024, Pijnaker joined the newly formed A-League Men side, Auckland FC, becoming their 22nd signing ahead of their inaugural season in the A-League Men. Pijnaker scored his first goal for the club against Sydney FC, netting the match-winner in the 97th minute. The match-worn shirt from the game was later donated to the Auckland Museum, where it became part of the museum’s collection representing Auckland FC’s inaugural A-League Men season.

== International career ==
=== U-20 ===
Pijnaker was named in the New Zealand U-20 side for the 2019 FIFA U-20 World Cup. Pijnaker played in all four games, playing full 90 minutes in all but one of them.

=== National team ===
Pijnaker made his senior debut for New Zealand on 18 November 2019, coming on as a substitute in their 0–1 loss to Lithuania.

On 25 June 2021, Pijnaker was called up to the New Zealand squad for the delayed 2020 Summer Olympics.

On 14 May 2026, Pijnaker was named in the 26-man New Zealand squad for the 2026 FIFA World Cup.

== Career statistics ==
Club	Season	League			Cup (Note: Includes appearances in the FAI Cup and Australia Cup.)		Continental		Other		Total	
Club	Season	Division	Apps	Goals	Apps	Goals	Apps	Goals	Apps	Goals	Apps	Goals
Eastern Suburbs	2017–18	Premiership	16	1	0	0	—		—		16	1
Grasshopper	2020–21	Swiss Challenge League	2	0	0	0	0	0	—		2	0
Rio Ave B	2020–21	Campeonato de Portugal	0	0	0	0	—		0	0	0	0
FC Helsingør	2021–22	1. Division	1	0	0	0	0	0	0	0	1	0
FC Helsingør	Total		19	1	0	0	0	0	0	0	19	1
Sligo Rovers	2022	Premier Division	31	1	0	0	4 (Note: Includes appearances in the UEFA Conference League.)	0	0	0	35	1
Sligo Rovers	2023	Premier Division	32	0	0	0	0	0	0	0	32	0
Sligo Rovers	2024	Premier Division	14	0	2	0	0	0	0	0	16	0
Sligo Rovers	Total		77	1	2	0	4	0	0	0	83	1
Auckland FC	2024–25	A-League Men	25	4	—		—		2 (Note: Includes appearances in the A-League Men finals series.)	0	27	4
Auckland FC	2025–26	A-League Men	13	0	1	0	—		4	0	18	0
Auckland FC	2026–27	A-League Men	0	0	—		0	0	1 (Note: Appearance in FIFA Intercontinental Cup)	0	1	0
Auckland FC	Total		38	4	1	0	0	0	7	0	46	4
Career total			134	6	3	0	4	0	7	0	148	6

== Honours ==
Western Suburbs

- Central League winners: 2017, 2019
- Chatham Cup runner-up: 2018

Eastern Suburbs

- New Zealand Football Championship champions: 2018–19

Auckland FC

- A-League Premiership: 2024–25
- A-League Men Championship: 2026
