= 2020–21 New Zealand Football Championship =

Football Championship

ISPS Handa Men's Premiership
- Season: 2020–21
- Champions: Team Wellington
- Premiers: Auckland City
- Matches: 56
- Goals: 186 (3.32 per match)
- Best player: Alex Paulsen (Wellington Phoenix)
- Top goalscorer: Hamish Watson (12) (Team Wellington)
- Biggest home win: Eastern Suburbs 8–0 Wellington Phoenix (31 January 2021)
- Biggest away win: Canterbury United 0–4 Waitakere United (14 November 2020); Wellington Phoenix 0–4 Eastern Suburbs (28 November 2020); Hamilton Wanderers 0–4 Auckland City (31 January 2021)
- Highest scoring: Eastern Suburbs 8–0 Wellington Phoenix (31 January 2021)
- All statistics correct as of 21 March 2021. Steve Sumner Trophy - Andy Bevin (Team Wellington)

The 2020–21 New Zealand Football Championship season (currently known as the ISPS Handa Men's Premiership for sponsorship reasons) was the seventeenth and final season of the NZFC since its establishment in 2004. Eight teams compete in the competition with Auckland City and Team Wellington representing the ISPS Handa Men's Premiership in the 2021 OFC Champions League after Auckland City finished Premiers, with Team Wellington finishing regular season runners-up in the 2019–20 competition, after the remainder of the competition was cancelled mid-March due to the COVID-19 pandemic in New Zealand. The change from ten teams to eight teams was due to Tasman United and Southern United joining Canterbury United to form a united South Island team, playing under the Canterbury United name. Auckland City won the league with a game in hand, taking top spot for their 12th premiership.

== Clubs ==
Team	Location	Stadium	Capacity	Manager	Kit manufacturer	Shirt sponsor
Auckland City	Auckland	Kiwitea Street	3,250	(England) José Figueira	Dynasty Sport	Vuksich & Borich, Trillian Trust Inc
Canterbury United	Christchurch	English Park	9,000	(England) Lee Padmore	Nike	McDonald's
Eastern Suburbs	Auckland	Madills Farm	1,000	(England) Tony Readings	Lilywhites	Winger Motors
Hamilton Wanderers	Hamilton	Porritt Stadium	5,000	(New Zealand) Kale Herbert	Dynasty Sport	The Soccer Shop
Hawke's Bay United	Napier	Bluewater Stadium	5,000	(England) Chris Greatholder (England) Bill Robertson	Adidas	Thirsty Whale
Team Wellington	Wellington	David Farrington Park	2,250	(New Zealand) Scott Hales	Nike	Stonewood Homes
Waitakere United	Auckland	Seddon Fields	1,000	(New Zealand) Chris Milicich	Lotto Sport Italia	Triumph Motorcycles
Wellington Phoenix	Lower Hutt	Fraser Park	750	(England) Paul Temple	Adidas	Huawei

== Regular season ==
=== League table ===
Pos	Team	Pld	W	D	L	GF	GA	GD	Pts	Qualification
1	Auckland City	14	8	4	2	27	13	+14	28	Qualification to Champions League group stage and Finals series
2	Team Wellington (C)	14	7	5	2	35	21	+14	26	Qualification to Finals series Disbanded at end of season
3	Hamilton Wanderers	14	5	5	4	23	21	+2	20	Qualification to Finals series
4	Eastern Suburbs	14	5	4	5	25	23	+2	19	Qualification to Finals series
5	Waitakere United	14	4	6	4	28	26	+2	18	Disbanded at end of season
6	Canterbury United	14	5	3	6	21	24	−3	18	Disbanded at end of season
7	Hawke's Bay United	14	4	1	9	17	29	−12	13	Disbanded at end of season
8	Wellington Phoenix Reserves	14	2	4	8	18	37	−19	10	

Source: NZ Football
(C) Champions

=== Positions by round ===
Team ╲ Round	1	2	3	4	5	6	7	8	9	10	11	12	13	14
Auckland City	3	6	4	4	5	4	1	1	2	1	1	1	1	1
Canterbury United	8	8	8	7	7	7	6	5	5	5	5	5	6	6
Eastern Suburbs	5	5	3	3	3	2	4	4	3	3	4	4	5	4
Hamilton Wanderers	2	1	1	1	1	3	3	3	4	4	3	3	3	3
Hawke's Bay United	7	7	7	8	8	8	8	8	6	7	7	7	7	7
Team Wellington	4	2	2	2	2	1	2	2	1	2	2	2	2	2
Waitakere United	1	4	5	5	6	6	7	7	8	6	6	6	4	5
Wellington Phoenix	6	3	6	6	4	5	5	6	7	8	8	8	8	8

Source: NZ Football
= Leader and qualification to OFC Champions League Group stage; = Qualification to Finals series

=== Fixtures and results ===
The season was scheduled to be played on a home and away basis between 14 November 2020 and 28 February 2021, with the finals series being played in March 2021. On 27 February 2021 it was announced that the game between Hawkes Bay United and Eastern Suburbs for Round 14 had been delayed because of a COVID-19 outbreak that resulted in the Auckland region moving to Level 3 and the rest of the country changing to Level 2. New Zealand Football announced that the game was to be rescheduled to be played as a midweek fixture sometime between 8–12 March but is dependent on the Alert Levels coming down. It was also announced that if the restrictions in Auckland remained, then the game would be cancelled and classed as a draw with both clubs sharing the points. If that was to happen, then the final top four teams for the semi-finals would be Auckland City, Team Wellington, Hamilton Wanderers and Waitakere United. This potentially could cause more issues, as two of the teams (Auckland City and Waitakere United) are based in the Auckland region so was also advised that in the event that the restrictions where still in place when the semi-finals where due to be played, then the competition would proceed to a straight final to be played between the two clubs that where top of the league at the end of the season. This would then see Auckland City and Team Wellington play the final, scheduled to be played on 21 March. With the restrictions in Auckland being lowered, the game was rescheduled and played on Wednesday 10 March 2021. The result of the game decided on who finished fourth and faced Auckland City for the second Semi-final.

==== Results table ====
Home \ Away	AC	CU	ES	HW	HB	TW	WU	WP
Auckland City	—	2–0	1–0	2–1	2–1	3–1	2–2	4–1
Canterbury United	1–0	—	1–0	2–3	2–1	0–2	0–4	5–1
Eastern Suburbs	1–1	3–1	—	1–1	1–2	1–1	2–2	8–0
Hamilton Wanderers	2–0	1–1	1–2	—	1–4	1–1	3–2	1–1
Hawke's Bay United	0–4	0–3	1–2	0–3	—	2–2	2–0	3–2
Team Wellington	2–2	3–1	7–0	3–2	2–1	—	3–4	5–2
Waitakere United	0–3	3–3	4–0	1–1	2–0	2–2	—	1–4
Wellington Phoenix Reserves	1–1	1–1	0–4	1–2	3–0	0–1	1–1	—

Source: Soccerway
Legend: Blue = home team win; Yellow = draw; Red = away team win.

All times are in New Zealand Time.

==== Round 1 ====
14 November 2020	Canterbury United	0–4	Waitakere United	Christchurch
14:00		Report	Greive 45'; Garriga 62'; Connor-McClean 81'; Schnell 90'	Stadium: English Park; Referee: Chris Bennett

14 November 2020	Wellington Phoenix	0–1	Team Wellington	Lower Hutt
14:00		Report	Sinclair 89'	Stadium: Fraser Park; Referee: Calvin-Kei Berg

15 November 2020	Hawke's Bay United	0–3	Hamilton Wanderers	Napier
14:00		Report	Signey 53', 55'; Tieku 85'	Stadium: Bluewater Stadium; Referee: John Rowbury

15 November 2020	Auckland City	1–0	Eastern Suburbs	Auckland
16:00	Tade 67' (pen.)	Report		Stadium: Kiwitea Street; Referee: Matt Conger

==== Round 2 ====
21 November 2020	Team Wellington	2–1	Hawke's Bay United	Wellington
13:00	Hailemariam 70'; Moreira 90'	Report	Randall 66'	Stadium: David Farrington Park; Referee: Matt Conger

21 November 2020	Waitakere United	1–4	Wellington Phoenix	Auckland
13:30	Greive 23'	Report	Khan 33' (o.g.); van Hattum 53'; Old 90', 90+5'	Stadium: Seddon Fields; Referee: Ben O'Connell

22 November 2020	Hamilton Wanderers	2–0	Auckland City	Hamilton
14:00	Tieku 32', 44'	Report		Stadium: Porritt Stadium; Referee: Luke Gardner

22 November 2020	Eastern Suburbs	3–1	Canterbury United	Auckland
16:00	Kalua 37'; Thurston 41'; Sinclair 63'	Report	Richards 56'	Stadium: Madills Farm; Referee: John Rowbury

==== Round 3 ====
28 November 2020	Wellington Phoenix	0–4	Eastern Suburbs	Lower Hutt
13:00		Report	Hoyle 3'; Thurston 32', 53'; Strong 81'	Stadium: Fraser Park; Referee: Chris Bennett

28 November 2020	Waitakere United	2–2	Team Wellington	Auckland
13:00	Searle 48'; Redfearn 90+2'	Report	Moreira 40'; Watson 60' (pen.)	Stadium: Seddon Fields; Referee: John Rowbury

29 November 2020	Auckland City	2–1	Hawke's Bay United	Auckland
14:00	Howieson 76' (pen.); Manickum 90+2'	Report	Randall 26'	Stadium: Kiwitea Street; Referee: Ben O'Connell

29 November 2020	Canterbury United	2–3	Hamilton Wanderers	Christchurch
16:00	Schwarz 45+1'; Coughlan 55' (pen.)	Report	Tieku 34'; Semmy 52'; Lamb 79'	Stadium: English Park; Referee: Matt Conger

==== Round 4 ====
6 December 2020	Hamilton Wanderers	1–1	Wellington Phoenix	Hamilton
13:00	Semmy 90+4' (pen.)	Report	Bidois 83'	Stadium: Porritt Stadium; Referee: Nick Waldron

6 December 2020	Hawke's Bay United	0–3	Canterbury United	Napier
13:30		Report	Delaney 51'; Coughlan 68'; Taguchi 71'	Stadium: Bluewater Stadium; Referee: Chris Bennett

6 December 2020	Eastern Suburbs	2–2	Waitakere United	Auckland
16:00	Thurston 48'; Hoyle 78' (pen.)	Report	Duncan 14'; Redfearn 40'	Stadium: Madills Farm; Referee: Calvin Berg

6 December 2020	Team Wellington	2–2	Auckland City	Wellington
16:00	Moreira 51' (pen.); Watson 54'	Report	Rogerson 12', 23'	Stadium: David Farrington Park; Referee: John Rowbury

==== Round 5 ====
12 December 2020	Wellington Phoenix	3–0	Hawke's Bay United	Lower Hutt
14:00	Ott 51'; Raimbault 75'; Bidois 78'	Report		Stadium: Fraser Park; Referee: Ben O'Connell

12 December 2020	Waitakere United	1–1	Hamilton Wanderers	Auckland
15:00	Kilkolly 86'	Report	Semmy 63'	Stadium: Seddon Fields; Referee: Matt Conger

13 December 2020	Eastern Suburbs	1–1	Team Wellington	Auckland
15:00	Thurston 45+2'	Report	Barcia 34'	Stadium: Madills Farm; Referee: Nick Waldron

13 December 2020	Canterbury United	1–0	Auckland City	Christchurch
16:00	Richards 89'	Report		Stadium: English Park; Referee: Calvin Berg

==== Round 6 ====
19 December 2020	Auckland City	4–1	Wellington Phoenix	Auckland
13:30	Manickum 58', 68'; Rogerson 86'; Awad 90+4'	Report	Bidois 45'	Stadium: Kiwitea Street; Referee: John Rowbury

19 December 2020	Team Wellington	3–1	Canterbury United	Wellington
14:00	Watson 43', 75'; Mason-Smith 47'	Report	King 88'	Stadium: David Farrington Park; Referee: Matt Conger

20 December 2020	Hawke's Bay United	2–0	Waitakere United	Napier
13:00	Randall 11', 85'	Report		Stadium: Bluewater Stadium; Referee: Nick Waldron

20 December 2020	Hamilton Wanderers	1–2	Eastern Suburbs	Hamilton
16:00	Tieku 20'	Report	Feutz 11', 34'	Stadium: Porritt Stadium; Referee: Calvin Berg

==== Round 7 ====
9 January 2021	Wellington Phoenix	1–1	Canterbury United	Lower Hutt
14:00	van Hattum 19'	Report	Surman 23' (o.g.)	Stadium: Fraser Park; Referee: Calvin Berg

10 January 2021	Hamilton Wanderers	1–1	Team Wellington	Hamilton
14:00	Tieku 45' (pen.)	Report	Barcia 42'	Stadium: Porritt Stadium; Referee: Nick Waldron

10 January 2021	Eastern Suburbs	1–2	Hawke's Bay United	Auckland
15:00	Drake 70'	Report	Hoy 56', 63'	Stadium: Madills Farm; Referee: John Rowbury

10 January 2021	Waitakere United	0–3	Auckland City	Auckland
16:00		Report	Awad 11'; Rogerson 23'; Howieson 48'	Stadium: Seddon Fields; Referee: Matt Conger

==== Round 8 ====
16 January 2021	Auckland City	2–1	Hamilton Wanderers	Auckland
14:00	Harris 31' (o.g.); Kaltack 53'	Report	Comber 80'	Stadium: Kiwitea Street; Referee: Calvin Berg

16 January 2021	Canterbury United	1–0	Eastern Suburbs	Christchurch
15:30	Richards 75'	Report		Stadium: English Park; Referee: Nick Waldron

17 January 2021	Hawke's Bay United	2–2	Team Wellington	Napier
13:00	Akers 64'; Delhommelle 75' (pen.)	Report	Mason-Smith 17'; Watson 40'	Stadium: Bluewater Stadium; Referee: Matt Conger

17 January 2021	Wellington Phoenix	1–1	Waitakere United	Lower Hutt
16:00	Mogg 78'	Report	Gibert 23'	Stadium: Fraser Park; Referee: John Rowbury

==== Round 9 ====
23 January 2021	Waitakere United	3–3	Canterbury United	Auckland
15:30	Schnell 77'; Gibert 79'; Grieve 87'	Report	Mitchell 17'; Matthysen 38'; Coughlan 90'	Stadium: Seddon Fields; Referee: Matt Conger

24 January 2021	Hamilton Wanderers	1–4	Hawke's Bay United	Hamilton
14:00	Harris 35'	Report	Akers 15', 60'; Othman 31'; Hoyle 75'	Stadium: Porritt Stadium; Referee: Nick Waldron

24 January 2021	Eastern Suburbs	1–1	Auckland City	Auckland
16:00	Mitchell 90' (o.g.)	Report	Manickum 78'	Stadium: Madills Farm; Referee: Calvin Berg

24 January 2021	Team Wellington	5–2	Wellington Phoenix	Wellington
16:00	Mason-Smith 23', 47'; Bevin 79', 87'; Surman 90+3' (o.g.)	Report	Old 7'; van Hattum 14'	Stadium: David Farrington Park; Referee: Ben O'Connell

==== Round 10 ====
30 January 2021	Team Wellington	3–4	Waitakere United	Wellington
13:00	Watson 17', 25' (pen.), 66'	Report	Greive 12' (pen.); Gibert 13'; Duncan 24'; Murati 57'	Stadium: David Farrington Park; Referee: Ben O'Connell

31 January 2021	Hamilton Wanderers	1–1	Canterbury United	Hamilton
13:00	Tieku 41'	Report	Richards 90+2'	Stadium: Porritt Stadium; Referee: John Rowbury

31 January 2021	Hawke's Bay United	0–4	Auckland City	Napier
14:00		Report	Vollenhoven 31'; Kaltack 61'; Awad 78'; Al-Kalisy 87'	Stadium: Bluewater Stadium; Referee: Calvin Berg

31 January 2021	Eastern Suburbs	8–0	Wellington Phoenix	Auckland
16:00	Mechell 36'; Feutz 52', 74', 87', 90+3'; Edwards 62'; Drake 64', 90'	Report		Stadium: Madills Farm; Referee: Nick Waldron

==== Round 11 ====
6 February 2021	Wellington Phoenix	1–2	Hamilton Wanderers	Lower Hutt
11:30	Clayton 34'	Report	Tieku 63'; Lamb 78'	Stadium: Fraser Park; Referee: Chris Bennett

6 February 2021	Waitakere United	4–0	Eastern Suburbs	Auckland
14:00	Duncan 25'; van den Hoven 28'; Greive 35'; Zoricich 63'	Report		Stadium: Seddon Fields; Referee: Calvin Berg

6 February 2021	Canterbury United	2–1	Hawke's Bay United	Christchurch
16:00	Taguchi 8'; Wilkinson 78'	Report	Othman 70'	Stadium: English Park; Referee: Ben O'Connell

7 February 2021	Auckland City	3–1	Team Wellington	Auckland
16:00	Manickum 50'; Howieson 70' (pen.); Rogerson 72'	Report	Watson 75'	Stadium: Kiwitea Street; Referee: Matt Conger

==== Round 12 ====
13 February 2021	Team Wellington	7–0	Eastern Suburbs	Wellington
13:00	Watson 3', 46', 69'; Bevin 43', 54'; Mason-Smith 72'; Zeb 90+2'	Report		Stadium: David Farrington Park; Referee: Ben O'Connell

14 February 2021	Hawke's Bay United	3–2	Wellington Phoenix	Napier
13:00	Akers 6', 75'; Othman 83'	Report	Toomey 47'; Bidois 72'	Stadium: Bluewater Stadium; Referee: Luke Gardner

14 February 2021	Auckland City	2–0	Canterbury United	Auckland
14:00	Howieson 71' (pen.); Rogerson 77'	Report		Stadium: Kiwitea Street; Referee: John Rowbury

14 February 2021	Hamilton Wanderers	3–2	Waitakere United	Hamilton
16:00	Tieku 54', 75', 90+4'	Report	Schnell 58'; Cromb 61'	Stadium: Porritt Stadium; Referee: Nick Waldron

==== Round 13 ====
20 February 2021	Canterbury United	0–2	Team Wellington	Christchurch
14:00		Report	Sinclair 30'; Bevin 43'	Stadium: English Park; Referee: Calvin Berg

20 February 2021	Wellington Phoenix	1–1	Auckland City	Lower Hutt
14:00	Bidois 52'	Report	Rogerson 79'	Stadium: Fraser Park; Referee: Ben O'Connell

21 February 2021	Eastern Suburbs	1–1	Hamilton Wanderers	Auckland
16:00	Drake 62'	Report	Contratti 79'	Stadium: Madills Farm; Referee: Nick Waldron

21 February 2021	Waitakere United	2–0	Hawke's Bay United	Auckland
16:00	van den Hoven 72'; Greive 75' (pen.)	Report		Stadium: Seddon Fields; Referee: Chris Bennett

==== Round 14 ====
27 February 2021	Team Wellington	3–2	Hamilton Wanderers	Wellington
13:00	Mason-Smith 17', 45', 85'	Report	Clarkin 20'; Tieku 58'	Stadium: David Farrington Park; Referee: Matt Conger

27 February 2021	Canterbury United	5-1	Wellington Phoenix	Christchurch
14:00	Matthysen 32'; Wilkinson 37'; Coughlan 45+1', 67', 76'	Report	Bidois 63'	Stadium: English Park; Referee: Nick Waldron

27 February 2021	Auckland City	2-2	Waitakere United	Auckland
15:00	Rogerson 17'; Awad 61'	Report	Schnell 50'; Gibert 90+2'	Stadium: Kiwitea Street; Referee: Calvin Berg

10 March 2021	Hawke's Bay United	1–2	Eastern Suburbs	Napier
16:15	Akers 48'	Report	Kalua 56'; Drake 70'	Stadium: Bluewater Stadium; Referee: John Rowbury

== Finals series ==
=== Semi-finals ===
13 March 2021	Team Wellington	4–1	Hamilton Wanderers	Wellington
14:05	Watson 12', 36', 70'; Mason-Smith 51'	Report	Semmy 60'	Stadium: David Farrington Park; Referee: Calvin Berg

14 March 2021	Auckland City	2–1	Eastern Suburbs	Auckland
14:05	Manickum 5'; Gray 51' (o.g.)	Report	Feutz 74'	Stadium: Kiwitea Street; Referee: Nick Waldron

=== Grand final ===
21 March 2021
16:10

Auckland City	2–4	Team Wellington
Tade 34' (pen.); Manickum 42'	Report	Bevin 15', 69'; Sinclair 31'; Whyte 55'

North Harbour Stadium, Auckland
Attendance: 1,587
Referee: Matt Conger (New Zealand)

Auckland; City	Team Wellington

GK	24	Cameron Brown
DF	14	Jordan Vale		(substituted off) 74'
DF	3	Adam Mitchell	(yellow card) 90+4'
DF	6	Brian Kaltak
DF	23	Alfie Rogers
MF	2	Mario Ilich		(substituted off) 89'
MF	7	Cameron Howieson (c)	(yellow card) 51'
MF	16	Yousif Al-Kalisy		(substituted off) 71'
FW	10	Dylan Manickum
FW	20	Emiliano Tade
FW	22	Mohamed Awad
Substitutes:
GK	18	Conor Tracey
DF	17	Andrew Blake		(substituted on) 74'
DF	4	Mario Bilen
DF	12	Sam Brotherton
MF	8	Albert Riera
FW	11	Kayne Vincent		(substituted on) 89'
FW	13	Deandre Vollenhoven		(substituted on) 71'
Manager:
José Figueira

GK	22	Zac Jones
DF	14	Jack-Henry Sinclair		(substituted off) 82'
DF	2	Justin Gulley
DF	4	Taylor Schrijvers
DF	6	Scott Midgley
DF	23	Rory McKeown
MF	5	Ollie Whyte
MF	11	Mario Barcia (c)	(yellow card) 71'	(substituted off) 88'
MF	12	Andy Bevin
FW	8	Sam Mason-Smith		(substituted off) 68'
FW	9	Hamish Watson
Substitutes:
GK	1	Scott Basalaj
DF	15	Jake Williams
MF	13	Sam Dewar
MF	19	Haris Zeb		(substituted on) 82'
MF	20	Wan Gatkek		(substituted on) 88'
FW	7	João Moreira		(substituted on) 68'
FW	10	Nathanael Hailemariam
Manager:
Scott Hales

Steve Sumner Trophy:

- Andy Bevin

== Statistics ==
As of 28 February 2021

=== Top scorers ===
Rank	Player	Club	Goals
1	Derek Tieku	Hamilton Wanderers	12
1	Hamish Watson^{†}	Team Wellington	12
3	Logan Rogerson	Auckland City	8
3	Sam Mason-Smith	Team Wellington	8
5	Riley Bidois	Wellington Phoenix Reserves	6
5	Garbhan Coughlan	Canterbury United	6
5	Ryan Feutz	Eastern Suburbs	6
5	Alex Greive	Waitakere United	6
9	Jorge Akers	Hawke's Bay United	5
9	Andy Bevin	Team Wellington	5
9	Gerard Garriga	Waitakere United	5
9	Dylan Manickum	Auckland City	5
9	Adam Thurston	Eastern Suburbs	5

^{†} Due to reaching 12 goals in less games, Hamish Watson was awarded the Golden Boot at the Grand finals.

=== Hat-tricks ===
Round	Player	For	Against	Result	Date
10	Hamish Watson	Team Wellington	Waitakere United	3–4	30 January 2021
10	Ryan Feutz	Eastern Suburbs	Wellington Phoenix Reserves	8–0	31 January 2021
12	Hamish Watson	Team Wellington	Eastern Suburbs	7–0	13 February 2021
12	Derek Tieku	Hamilton Wanderers	Waitakere United	3–2	14 February 2021
14	Sam Mason-Smith	Team Wellington	Hamilton Wanderers	3–2	27 February 2021
14	Garbhan Coughlan	Canterbury United	Wellington Phoenix Reserves	5–1	27 February 2021

=== Own goals ===
Round	Player	Club	Against
2	Shuiab Khan	Waitakere United	Wellington Phoenix Reserves
7	Finn Surman	Wellington Phoenix Reserves	Canterbury United
8	Joseph Harris	Hamilton Wanderers	Auckland City
9	Adam Mitchell	Auckland City	Eastern Suburbs
9	Finn Surman	Wellington Phoenix Reserves	Team Wellington
