= 2024 New Zealand National League =

Football championship

New Zealand National League
- Season: 2024
- Dates: 22 March 2024 – 1 December 2024
- Champions: Auckland City
- OFC Champions League: Auckland City
- Matches: 46
- Goals: 176 (3.83 per match)
- Top goalscorer: Daniel Bunch; Garbhan Coughlan; Monty Patterson (8 goals each)
- Biggest home win: Coastal Spirit 5–0 Western Suburbs (13 October 2024); Western Springs 5–0 Wellington Phoenix Reserves (23 November 2024)
- Biggest away win: Western Suburbs 0–4 Cashmere Technical (29 September 2024); Cashmere Technical 0–4 Wellington Phoenix Reserves (6 October 2024); Western Suburbs 0–4 Western Springs (17 November 2024)
- Highest scoring: Western Springs 6–2 Coastal Spirit (5 October 2024)
- Longest winning run: 4 matches Birkenhead United; Western Springs
- Longest unbeaten run: 8 matches Birkenhead United
- Longest winless run: 8 matches Western Suburbs
- Longest losing run: 6 match Western Suburbs

The 2024 New Zealand Men's National League was the fourth season of the National League since its restructuring in 2021. 32 clubs compete in the competition, with four qualifying from the Northern League, three qualifying from the Central League and two qualifying from the Southern League for the National Championship phase. Each team can field a maximum of four foreign players as well as one additional foreign player who has Oceania Football Confederation nationality. Over the course of the season, each team must also ensure players aged 20 or under account for 10% of available playing minutes.

The qualifying league fixtures were announced on 1 March 2024. The Northern League started on 22 March 2024 with the Central and Southern leagues starting the following weekend on 29 and 28 March respectively. The Northern and Central leagues concluded on 31 August 2024 with the Southern League concluding on 1 September 2024.

The week the Northern League started, NRF announced changes to the competition structure for the 2024 season to accommodate Auckland FC. Auckland FC will have a reserves team playing in the qualifying and championship phases from next season to fulfil their A-League Men requirements. To allow space for Auckland FC, the Northern League will now have a relegation play-off between the 10th place team and the runners up of the 2024 NRFL Championship for this season only.

The championship phase fixtures were announced on 17 September 2024, with the opening games to be played on 28 September 2024.

== Qualifying leagues ==
=== 2024 Northern League ===
Northern League
- Season: 2024
- Dates: 22 March 2024 – 31 August 2024
- Champions: Auckland City
- Relegated: Melville United; Hamilton Wanderers
- Matches: 132
- Goals: 468 (3.55 per match)
- Top goalscorer: Jacob Mechell (19 goals)
- Biggest home win: Manurewa 7–1 Melville United (6 April 2024); Western Springs 7–1 Tauranga City (13 April 2024)
- Biggest away win: West Coast Rangers 0–5 Birkenhead United (21 June 2024); Tauranga City 0–5 Auckland City (29 June 2024); Bay Olympic 0–5 Melville United (17 August 2024)
- Highest scoring: Auckland City 7–3 Melville United (20 April 2024)
- Longest winning run: 6 matches Auckland City; Western Springs
- Longest unbeaten run: 12 matches Birkenhead United
- Longest winless run: 12 matches Manurewa
- Longest losing run: 7 matches Melville United

==== Northern League teams ====
Twelve teams are competing in the league – the top ten teams from the previous season and the two teams promoted from the NRFL Championship. The promoted teams are Tauranga City and East Coast Bays. It is both Tauranga City's and East Coast Bay's first season in the National League. They replaced Takapuna (relegated after a two-year Northern League spell) and Manukau United (relegated after a three-year Northern League spell).

Team	Home ground	Location	2023 season
Auckland City	Kiwitea Street	Sandringham, Auckland	1st
Auckland United	Keith Hay Park	Mount Roskill, Auckland	3rd
Bay Olympic	Olympic Park	New Lynn, Auckland	10th
Birkenhead United	Shepherds Park	Beach Haven, Auckland	8th
East Coast Bays	Bay City Park	Northcross, Auckland	2nd in Championship (promoted)
Eastern Suburbs	Madills Farm	Kohimarama, Auckland	2nd
Hamilton Wanderers	Porritt Stadium	Chartwell, Hamilton	6th
Manurewa	War Memorial Park	Manurewa, Auckland	4th
Melville United	Gower Park	Melville, Hamilton	9th
Tauranga City	Links Avenue Reserve	Mount Maunganui	1st in Championship (promoted)
West Coast Rangers	Fred Taylor Park	Whenuapai, Auckland	7th
Western Springs	Seddon Fields	Westmere, Auckland	5th

==== Northern League personnel ====
Team	Manager	Captain
Auckland City	(Spain) Albert Riera	(New Zealand) Mario Ilich
Auckland United	(England) José Figueira	(New Zealand) Ross Haviland
Bay Olympic	(New Zealand) Peter Smith	(New Zealand) Callum McNeill
Birkenhead United	(England) Paul Hobson	(New Zealand) Luke Jorgensen
East Coast Bays	(New Zealand) Joe Hall	(New Zealand) Louie Caunter
Eastern Suburbs	(New Zealand) Kane Wintersgill	(New Zealand) Adam Thomas
Hamilton Wanderers	(Wales) Joseph Hinds	
Manurewa	(New Zealand) Dylan Burns	
Melville United	(New Zealand) Jarrod Young	(New Zealand) Erik Panzer
Tauranga City	(Scotland) Barry Gardiner	(New Zealand) Campbell Higgins
West Coast Rangers	(New Zealand) Chad Coombes	(Malaysia) Dev Pokhrel
Western Springs	(England) Scott Hales	(New Zealand) Oscar Ramsay

==== Northern League managerial changes ====
Team	Outgoing manager	Manner of departure	Date of vacancy	Position in the table	Incoming manager	Date of appointment
Manurewa	(New Zealand) Paul Marshall	Stepped down	1 December 2023	Pre-season	(New Zealand) Brett McMurdoch	22 December 2023
Manurewa	(New Zealand) Brett McMurdoch	No reason given	13 May 2024	7th	(New Zealand) Dylan Burns	13 May 2024
Bay Olympic	(Czech Republic) Rudy Mozr	Stepped down	25 May 2024	7th	(New Zealand) Peter Smith	25 May 2024

==== Northern League table ====
Pos	Team	Pld	W	D	L	GF	GA	GD	Pts	Qualification
1	Auckland City (C)	22	16	3	3	53	21	+32	51	Winner of Northern League and qualification to National League Championship
2	Western Springs	22	14	4	4	52	30	+22	46	Qualification to National League Championship
3	Eastern Suburbs	22	14	2	6	38	20	+18	44	Qualification to National League Championship
4	Birkenhead United	22	13	4	5	54	31	+23	43	Qualification to National League Championship
5	Auckland United	22	12	4	6	39	27	+12	40	
6	Bay Olympic	22	9	1	12	39	42	−3	28	
7	Tauranga City	22	7	4	11	38	56	−18	25	
8	West Coast Rangers	22	6	5	11	28	45	−17	23	
9	East Coast Bays	22	5	7	10	29	38	−9	22	
10	Manurewa (O)	22	5	4	13	41	56	−15	19	Qualification for the relegation play-offs
11	Melville United (R)	22	6	0	16	29	54	−25	18	Relegation to NRFL Championship
12	Hamilton Wanderers (R)	22	2	8	12	28	48	−20	14	Relegation to NRFL Championship

Source: NRF
Rules for classification: 1) Points; 2) Goal difference; 3) Goals scored; 4) Goals against; 5) Head to head; 6) Disciplinary record; 7) Coin toss
(C) Champions; (O) Play-off winners; (R) Relegated

==== Northern League results table ====
Home \ Away	AKC	AKU	BAY	BIR	ECB	EAS	HAM	MRW	MEL	TGA	WCR	WSP
Auckland City	—	0–0	0–1	2–2	1–0	1–0	3–1	3–2	7–3	3–1	2–1	2–1
Auckland United	0–3	—	3–2	2–4	2–0	0–1	3–0	2–2	1–0	4–2	6–1	0–2
Bay Olympic	0–2	0–1	—	1–2	2–1	2–1	3–3	7–2	0–5	1–5	4–2	2–0
Birkenhead United	3–1	1–0	3–1	—	0–0	1–2	0–0	3–2	2–0	3–3	3–1	4–1
East Coast Bays	0–3	1–1	1–3	3–0	—	1–3	2–2	0–3	2–0	4–2	1–2	0–2
Eastern Suburbs	1–0	1–2	1–0	1–4	1–2	—	1–0	3–0	1–0	4–3	2–0	1–2
Hamilton Wanderers	2–5	1–1	1–5	1–4	2–2	0–0	—	3–3	1–2	2–0	2–1	2–4
Manurewa	2–1	1–3	4–3	1–4	1–3	0–3	2–1	—	7–1	0–0	1–2	1–2
Melville United	2–3	1–2	1–0	1–4	2–0	0–4	2–1	4–2	—	1–2	1–2	1–4
Tauranga City	0–5	1–4	1–2	3–2	2–2	1–5	1–0	2–1	4–0	—	2–1	1–4
West Coast Rangers	0–3	0–1	1–0	0–5	2–2	0–1	2–2	2–2	3–1	1–1	—	2–2
Western Springs	1–1	3–1	2–0	3–2	2–2	1–1	2–1	4–2	2–1	7–1	1–2	—

Source: Soccerway
Legend: Blue = home team win; Yellow = draw; Red = away team win.

==== Relegation play-offs ====
The relegation play-offs took place on 14 and 21 September 2024.

===== Overview =====
Team 1	Agg.	Team 2	1st leg	2nd leg
Manurewa (NL)	4–4 (4–2 p)	Manukau United (C)	4–2	0–2 (a.e.t.)

===== Matches =====
14 September 2024
15:00

Manurewa	4–2	Manukau United
Ramirez 45+3', 52'; Echague 76'; Bala 81'	Report	Echague 56' (o.g.); Horgan 59'

Manurewa War Memorial Park, Manurewa
21 September 2024
15:00

Manukau United	2–0 (a.e.t.)	Manurewa
Ozawa 57', 90+6'	Report
Penalties
	2–4

Walter Massey Park, Māngere East
Referee: Andres Castro

4–4 on aggregate. Manurewa won 4–2 on penalties, and therefore both clubs remained in their respective leagues.

==== Northern League scoring ====
===== Northern League top scorers =====
Rank	Player	Club	Goals
1	(New Zealand) Jacob Mechell	Eastern Suburbs	19
2	(New Zealand) Monty Patterson	Birkenhead United	14
2	(Argentina) Emiliano Tade	Western Springs	14
4	(Argentina) Eber Ramírez	Manurewa	13
5	(New Zealand) Jonty Bidois	Tauranga City	12
6	(England) Dawson Straffon	West Coast Rangers / Western Springs	11
7	(New Zealand) Liam Gillion	Auckland City	10
7	(Chile) Ronaldo Munoz	Bay Olympic / Hamilton Wanderers	10
7	(New Zealand) Allan Pearce	West Coast Rangers	10
7	(New Zealand) Samuel Philip	Birkenhead United	10
7	(New Zealand) Malcolm Young	East Coast Bays	10

===== Northern League hat-tricks =====
Round	Player	For	Against	Home/Away	Result	Date
1	(New Zealand) Jonty Bidois	Tauranga City	Melville United	Home	4–0	23 March 2024
3	(New Zealand) Jacob Mechell	Eastern Suburbs	East Coast Bays	Away	1–3	1 April 2024
4	(Argentina) Eber Ramírez	Manurewa	Melville United	Home	7–1	6 April 2024
4	(New Zealand) Jacob Mechell (Note: Player scored 4 goals)	Eastern Suburbs	Tauranga City	Home	4–3	6 April 2024
7	(Germany) Ibrahim Nadir	Bay Olympic	Hamilton Wanderers	Away	1–5	27 April 2024
16	(New Zealand) Sam Philip	Birkenhead United	Manurewa	Away	1–4	20 July 2024
21 (Note: Rounds 17 and 21 were reversed)	(England) Dawson Straffon	Western Springs	Tauranga City	Away	1–4	27 July 2024
19	(New Zealand) Sean Leadley	Melville United	Manurewa	Home	4–2	10 August 2024
22	(New Zealand) Michael Graham	Bay Olympic	Manurewa	Home	7–2	31 August 2024

=== 2024 Central League ===
Central League
- Season: 2024
- Dates: 29 March 2024 – 31 August 2024
- Champions: Wellington Olympic
- Relegated: Stop Out
- Matches: 90
- Goals: 411 (4.57 per match)
- Top goalscorer: Oscar Faulds (21 goals)
- Biggest home win: Miramar Rangers 10–0 Stop Out (31 August 2024)
- Biggest away win: Petone 0–9 Miramar Rangers (13 July 2024)
- Highest scoring: Miramar Rangers 10–0 Stop Out (31 August 2024)
- Longest winning run: 16 matches Wellington Olympic
- Longest unbeaten run: 16 matches Wellington Olympic
- Longest winless run: 13 matches Stop Out
- Longest losing run: 6 matches Stop Out

==== Central League teams ====
Ten teams are competing in the league – the top nine teams from the previous season and the one team promoted from the 2022 play-off between the winners of the Central Federation League and the Capital Premier. The winner of the play-off was Island Bay United. This is their first season in the Central League, since New Zealand football's restructuring in 2021. They replaced Whanganui Athletic (relegated to the Central Federation League after one season in the Central League).

Team	Home ground	Location	2023 season
Island Bay United	Wakefield Park	Island Bay, Wellington	1st in Capital Premier (promoted via play-offs)
Miramar Rangers	David Farrington Park	Miramar, Wellington	7th
Napier City Rovers	Bluewater Stadium	Napier	3rd
North Wellington	Alex Moore Park	Johnsonville, Wellington	9th
Petone	Memorial Park	Petone, Lower Hutt	4th
Stop Out	Hutt Park	Moera, Lower Hutt	8th
Waterside Karori	Karori Park	Karori, Wellington	6th
Wellington Olympic	Wakefield Park	Island Bay, Wellington	1st
Wellington Phoenix Reserves	Fraser Park	Taitā, Lower Hutt	2nd
Western Suburbs	Endeavour Park	Porirua	5th

==== Central League personnel ====
Team	Manager	Captain
Island Bay United	(New Zealand) Stu Jacobs	
Miramar Rangers	(New Zealand) Kale Herbert	(England) Sam Mason-Smith
Napier City Rovers	(England) Bill Robertson	(England) Jim Hoyle
North Wellington	(New Zealand) Ryan Faithfull	(Canada) Gavin Hoy
Petone	(New Zealand) Sam Morrissey	(New Zealand) Hami Paranihi-Nuku
Stop Out	(Italy) Aston Hughes	(Poland) Maxim Johnson
Waterside Karori	(Chile) Tomás Godoy Fouquet	(England) Harry Fautley
Wellington Olympic	(New Zealand) Ekow Quainoo	(Cook Islands) Ben Mata
Wellington Phoenix Reserves	(England) Chris Greenacre	(New Zealand) Isaac Hughes
Western Suburbs	(South Africa) Alan Koch	(Canada) Malik Smith

==== Central League managerial changes ====
Team	Outgoing manager	Manner of departure	Date of vacancy	Position in the table	Incoming manager	Date of appointment
North Wellington	(New Zealand) James Prosser	End of interim spell	1 November 2023	Pre-season	(New Zealand) Ryan Faithfull	1 November 2023
Petone	(New Zealand) Ryan Edwards	Signed by Christchurch United	21 November 2023	Pre-season	(New Zealand) Sam Morrissey	21 November 2023
Waterside Karori	(New Zealand) Sam Morrissey	Signed by Petone	21 November 2023	Pre-season	(New Zealand) Rory Fallon	4 December 2023
Wellington Olympic	(New Zealand) Rupert Kemeys	Mutual consent	26 November 2023	Pre-season	(New Zealand) Ekow Quainoo	13 December 2023
Island Bay United	(Chile) Tomás Godoy Fouquet	Stepped down	6 December 2023	Pre-season	(New Zealand) Stu Jacobs	14 January 2024
Waterside Karori	(New Zealand) Rory Fallon	Mutual consent	18 January 2024	Pre-season	(Chile) Tomás Godoy Fouquet	18 January 2024

==== Central League table ====
Pos	Team	Pld	W	D	L	GF	GA	GD	Pts	Qualification
1	Wellington Olympic (C)	18	17	0	1	79	16	+63	51	Winner of Central League and qualification to National League Championship
2	Western Suburbs	18	13	1	4	54	24	+30	40	Qualification to National League Championship
3	Napier City Rovers	18	13	1	4	53	23	+30	40	Qualification to National League Championship
4	Miramar Rangers	18	11	2	5	61	21	+40	35	
5	Wellington Phoenix Reserves (Note: Wellington Phoenix Reserves gain automatic entry into the National League Championship phase due to the A-League Men requirements.)	18	7	3	8	34	40	−6	24	Qualification to National League Championship
6	Waterside Karori	18	7	3	8	35	48	−13	24	
7	Petone	18	6	3	9	28	45	−17	21	
8	Island Bay United	18	4	0	14	25	64	−39	12	
9	North Wellington	18	2	3	13	23	63	−40	9	
10	Stop Out (R)	18	1	2	15	19	67	−48	5	Relegation to Central League 2

Source: Capital Football
Rules for classification: 1) Points; 2) Goal difference; 3) Goals scored; 4) Goals against; 5) Head to head; 6) Disciplinary record; 7) Coin toss
(C) Champions; (R) Relegated

==== Central League results table ====
Home \ Away	IBU	MRA	NCR	NWT	PET	SOT	WKA	WOP	WPX	WES
Island Bay United	—	0–2	1–5	2–3	0–3	4–3	0–1	1–6	1–3	1–7
Miramar Rangers	5–0	—	2–3	8–1	1–1	10–0	4–3	0–1	4–0	3–2
Napier City Rovers	3–1	2–3	—	6–1	2–1	3–0	7–1	0–3	2–0	2–2
North Wellington	1–4	0–6	2–3	—	2–2	3–1	0–2	0–5	1–5	1–5
Petone	2–3	0–9	1–0	2–1	—	3–2	2–1	1–5	2–2	1–3
Stop Out	3–4	0–2	0–2	1–1	1–3	—	3–2	1–6	1–1	0–4
Waterside Karori	2–1	1–1	1–5	3–3	2–1	4–1	—	0–5	2–1	2–4
Wellington Olympic	8–0	3–0	2–0	4–2	6–0	8–0	4–1	—	4–2	3–5
Wellington Phoenix Reserves	2–1	2–0	1–6	2–1	3–2	2–1	2–2	3–5	—	0–1
Western Suburbs	5–1	2–1	1–2	2–0	2–1	5–1	2–3	0–1	2–1	—

Source: Soccerway
Legend: Blue = home team win; Yellow = draw; Red = away team win.

==== Central League scoring ====
===== Central League top scorers =====
Rank	Player	Club	Goals
1	(New Zealand) Oscar Faulds	Napier City Rovers	21
2	(United States) Lucas Meek	Western Suburbs	15
3	(New Zealand) Hamish Watson	Wellington Olympic	14
4	(England) Sam Mason-Smith	Miramar Rangers	13
5	(Uruguay) Martín Bueno	Miramar Rangers	11
5	(New Zealand) Jack O'Connor	Petone	11
7	(Argentina) Tomas Alvarado	Waterside Karori	10
8	(Argentina) Nicolas Bobadilla	Miramar Rangers	8
8	(England) Connor Gaul	Stop Out	8
8	(Cook Islands) Ben Mata	Wellington Olympic	8
8	(Canada) Connor Wilson	Western Suburbs	8

===== Central League hat-tricks =====
Round	Player	For	Against	Home/Away	Result	Date
1	(United States) Lucas Meek (Note: Player scored 4 goals)	Western Suburbs	Island Bay United	Away	1–7	30 March 2024
1	(Uruguay) Martín Bueno	Miramar Rangers	Wellington Phoenix Reserves	Home	4–0	30 March 2024
2	(New Zealand) Oscar Faulds	Napier City Rovers	Waterside Karori	Away	1–5	6 April 2024
2	(United States) Lucas Meek	Western Suburbs	Wellington Olympic	Away	3–5	7 April 2024
3	(New Zealand) Oscar Faulds	Napier City Rovers	Wellington Phoenix Reserves	Away	1–6	20 April 2024
5	(England) Sam Mason-Smith	Miramar Rangers	North Wellington	Away	0–6	26 April 2024
5	(Argentina) Tomas Alvarado	Waterside Karori	Stop Out	Home	4–1	27 April 2024
7	(New Zealand) Miles Green	Western Suburbs	North Wellington	Away	1–5	11 May 2024
8	(Argentina) Agustín Contratti	Miramar Rangers	Waterside Karori	Home	4–3	18 May 2024
10	(United States) Lucas Meek	Western Suburbs	Island Bay United	Home	5–1	9 June 2024
11	(New Zealand) Oscar Faulds	Napier City Rovers	Waterside Karori	Home	7–1	23 June 2024
13	(New Zealand) Joshua Tollervey	Miramar Rangers	Petone	Away	0–9	13 July 2024
14	(New Zealand) Oscar Faulds	Napier City Rovers	Island Bay United	Away	1–5	21 July 2024
14	(England) Sam Mason-Smith	Miramar Rangers	North Wellington	Home	8–1	21 July 2024
15	(New Zealand) Isa Prins	Wellington Olympic	Island Bay United	Home	8–0	3 August 2024
17	(Cook Islands) Ben Mata	Wellington Olympic	Petone	Home	6–0	24 August 2024

=== 2024 Southern League ===
Southern League
- Season: 2024
- Dates: 28 March – 1 September
- Champions: Cashmere Technical
- Relegated: FC Twenty 11
- Matches: 89
- Goals: 419 (4.71 per match)
- Best player: David Yoo
- Top goalscorer: Garbhan Coughlan (26 goals)
- Biggest home win: Cashmere Technical 12–0; FC Twenty 11 (6 April)
- Biggest away win: FC Twenty 11 0–9; Nelson Suburbs (29 March); FC Twenty 11 1–10; Cashmere Technical (28 June)
- Highest scoring: Cashmere Technical 12–0; FC Twenty 11 (6 April)
- Longest winning run: 9 matches Cashmere Technical
- Longest unbeaten run: 14 matches Coastal Spirit
- Longest winless run: 18 matches FC Twenty 11
- Longest losing run: 15 matches FC Twenty 11

==== Southern League teams ====
Ten teams are competing in the league – nine teams from the previous season and the winner of the Southern League play-offs. The promoted team is the University of Canterbury. This is their first season in the Southern League. They replaced Green Island (relegated after three seasons in the Southern League).

Team	Home ground	Location	2023 season
Cashmere Technical	Garrick Memorial Park	Woolston, Christchurch	2nd
Christchurch United	United Sports Centre	Yaldhurst, Christchurch	1st
Coastal Spirit	Linfield Park	Linwood, Christchurch	3rd
Dunedin City Royals	Football Turf	Dunedin North, Dunedin	4th
FC Twenty 11	Avonhead Park	Avonhead, Christchurch	10th
Ferrymead Bays	Ferrymead Park	Ferrymead, Christchurch	5th
Nelson Suburbs	Saxton Field	Stoke, Nelson	6th
Nomads United	Tulett Park	Casebrook, Christchurch	7th
Selwyn United	Foster Park	Rolleston	9th
University of Canterbury	English Park	St Albans, Christchurch	1st in Canterbury Premiership (promoted via play-offs)

==== Southern League personnel ====
Team	Manager	Captain
Cashmere Technical	(England) Dan Schwarz	(England) Tom Schwarz
Christchurch United	(New Zealand) Ryan Edwards	(New Zealand) Joel Stevens
Coastal Spirit	(New Zealand) Robbie Stanton	(New Zealand) Dominic McGarr
Dunedin City Royals	(New Zealand) Richard Murray	(New Zealand) Jared Grove
FC Twenty 11	(Uruguay) Ricardo Felitti	(New Zealand) Harrison Rowe
Ferrymead Bays	(New Zealand) Alan Walker	(Republic of Ireland) James Deehan
Nelson Suburbs	(Northern Ireland) Ryan Stewart	(Australia) Sam Ayers
Nomads United	(New Zealand) Matthew Jansen	(New Zealand) Caleb Cottom
Selwyn United	(New Zealand) Chris Brown	(New Zealand) Jayden Booth
University of Canterbury	(New Zealand) Ben Ellis	(New Zealand) Liam Pledger

==== Southern League managerial changes ====
Note: Some cases use first/last match coached

Team	Outgoing manager	Manner of departure	Date of vacancy	Position in the table	Incoming manager	Date of appointment
University of Canterbury	(New Zealand) Anthony O'Connor	Stepped down	11 October 2023	Pre-season	(Uruguay) Aldo Miramontes	11 October 2023
FC Twenty 11	(Bulgaria) Cvetan Ivanov	Stepped down to TDP	16 October 2023	Pre-season	(New Zealand) Graham McMann	16 October 2023
Christchurch United	(Barbados) Paul Ifill	Signed by Wellington Olympic to be Director of Football	21 November 2023	Pre-season	(New Zealand) Ryan Edwards	21 November 2023
Selwyn United	(New Zealand) Lee Padmore	Signed by Wellington Phoenix Academy	17 January 2024	Pre-season	(New Zealand) Chris Brown	11 February 2024
FC Twenty 11	(New Zealand) Graham McMann	Resigned	8 June 2024	10th	(New Zealand) Kevin Peters (Caretaker)	23 June 2024
FC Twenty 11	(New Zealand) Kevin Peters	End of Caretaker	13 July 2024	10th	(Uruguay) Ricardo Felitti	14 July 2024
University of Canterbury	(Uruguay) Aldo Miramontes	Mutual consent	17 July 2024	8th	(New Zealand) Ben Ellis	21 July 2024

==== Southern League table ====
Pos	Team	Pld	W	D	L	GF	GA	GD	Pts	Qualification
1	Cashmere Technical (C)	18	15	2	1	90	19	+71	47	Winner of Southern League and qualification to National League Championship
2	Coastal Spirit	18	14	3	1	59	17	+42	45	Qualification to National League Championship
3	Christchurch United	18	13	2	3	64	21	+43	41	
4	Nelson Suburbs	17	8	5	4	52	39	+13	29	
5	Ferrymead Bays	18	8	1	9	39	39	0	25	
6	Nomads United	18	7	3	8	27	31	−4	24	
7	Dunedin City Royals	17	6	1	10	27	46	−19	19	
8	Selwyn United	18	4	2	12	31	68	−37	14	
9	University of Canterbury	18	3	2	13	21	46	−25	11	
10	FC Twenty 11 (R)	18	0	1	17	9	93	−84	1	Relegated to Canterbury Premiership

Source: Mainland Football
Rules for classification: 1) Points; 2) Goal difference; 3) Goals scored; 4) Goals against; 5) Head to head; 6) Disciplinary record; 7) Coin toss
(C) Champions; (R) Relegated
- The final game between Dunedin City Royals and Nelson Suburbs was cancelled, with neither team being able to change league positions regardless of result. The game was originally postponed after Nelson's flight was unable to land in Dunedin due to strong winds.

==== Southern League results table ====
Home \ Away	CAS	CHU	CSP	DCR	FCT	FMB	NEL	NOM	SEL	UCF
Cashmere Technical		4–2	0–2	2–0	12–0	3–0	6–2	3–0	4–2	6–1
Christchurch United	1–1		2–3	5–0	11–0	2–3	4–0	3–0	9–0	4–3
Coastal Spirit	4–4	0–1		2–1	2–0	1–0	2–2	2–0	7–0	5–1
Dunedin City Royals	1–5	1–3	0–5		3–1	4–4	Can. (Note: Game canceled due to Nelson Suburbs unable to land in Dunedin Airport)	2–1	3–0	4–0
FC Twenty 11	1–10	0–4	0–7	1–2		1–5	0–9	0–5	2–5	1–6
Ferrymead Bays	2–3	3–4	0–3	3–2	3–0		2–3	1–3	3–2	1–0
Nelson Suburbs	1–6	1–1	3–3	6–2	4–2	4–2		2–2	4–4	5–1
Nomads United	0–6	1–2	0–4	2–0	2–0	2–1	2–0		4–1	1–2
Selwyn United	0–8	1–5	2–5	5–0	4–0	2–4	0–5	1–1		0–3
University of Canterbury	0–7	0–1	1–2	1–2	0–0	0–3	0–1	1–1	1–2	

Source: Soccerway
Legend: Blue = home team win; Yellow = draw; Red = away team win.

==== Southern League scoring ====
===== Southern League top scorers =====
Rank	Player	Club	Goals
1	(Republic of Ireland) Garbhan Coughlan	Cashmere Technical	26
2	(United States) Alex Steinwascher	Coastal Spirit	19
2	(New Zealand) Joel Stevens	Christchurch United	19
4	(United States) Trevin Myers	Nelson Suburbs	13
5	(New Zealand) Lennon Whewell	Nelson Suburbs	12
6	(New Zealand) Gabriel Gallaway	Cashmere Technical	10
6	(Republic of Ireland) Jack Hallahan	Cashmere Technical	10
6	(New Zealand) David Yoo	Christchurch United	10
9	(South Africa) Lyle Matthysen	Cashmere Technical	9
9	(New Zealand) Cameron Rean	Ferrymead Bays	9
9	(Japan) Yuya Taguchi	Cashmere Technical	9

===== Southern League hat-tricks =====
Round	Player	For	Against	Home/Away	Result	Date
1	(Canada) Spencer Barber	Nelson Suburbs	FC Twenty 11	Away	0–9	29 March 2024
1	(New Zealand) Lennon Whewell	Nelson Suburbs	FC Twenty 11	Away	0–9	29 March 2024
1	(United States) Alex Steinwascher (Note: Player scored 4 goals)	Coastal Spirit	Selwyn United	Home	7–0	29 March 2024
2	(Republic of Ireland) Garbhan Coughlan (Note: Player scored 6 goals)	Cashmere Technical	FC Twenty 11	Home	12–0	4 April 2024
2	(South Africa) Lyle Matthysen	Cashmere Technical	FC Twenty 11	Home	12–0	4 April 2024
3	(United States) Trevin Myers	Nelson Suburbs	Selwyn United	Away	0–5	13 April 2024
4	(New Zealand) Joel Stevens	Christchurch United	Dunedin City Royals	Home	5–0	20 April 2024
4	(Republic of Ireland) Garbhan Coughlan	Cashmere Technical	Selwyn United	Home	4–2	20 April 2024
5	(Republic of Ireland) Garbhan Coughlan	Cashmere Technical	Nelson Suburbs	Away	1–6	28 April 2024
6	(Republic of Ireland) Garbhan Coughlan	Cashmere Technical	University of Canterbury	Away	0–7	4 May 2024
7	(New Zealand) Jacob Killick	Universities of Canterbury	FC Twenty 11	Away	1–6	18 May 2024
10	(New Zealand) Lennon Whewell	Nelson Suburbs	FC Twenty 11	Home	4–2	23 June 2024
14	(New Zealand) Joel Stevens	Christchurch United	FC Twenty 11	Home	11–0	2 August 2024
16	(Republic of Ireland) Garbhan Coughlan (Note: Player scored 5 goals)	Cashmere Technical	Nomads United	Away	0–6	17 August 2024
16	(New Zealand) Joel Stevens	Christchurch United	Selwyn United	Home	9–0	17 August 2024
16	(New Zealand) Matthew Brazier	Christchurch United	Selwyn United	Home	9–0	17 August 2024
18	(New Zealand) Finlay Cotton	Selwyn United	Dunedin City Royals	Home	5–0	7 September 2024

===== Southern League own goals =====
Round	Player	Club	H/A	Time	Goal	Result	Opponent	Date
2	(New Zealand) Jamie Barr	Ferrymead Bays	Home	77'	3–3	3–4	Christchurch United	6 April 2024
8	(New Zealand) Sena Eady	FC Twenty 11	Home	19'	0–3	0–7	Coastal Spirit	25 May 2024
12	(New Zealand) Caleb Osborne	Dunedin City Royals	Away	69'	2–1	3–1	Ferrymead Bays	13 July 2024
13	(New Zealand) Max McGuinness	University of Canterbury	Away	33'	3–0	5–1	Nelson Suburbs	21 July 2024
14	(New Zealand) Daniel Oakman	FC Twenty 11	Away	22'	3–0	11–0	Christchurch United	2 August 2024
17	(New Zealand) Jack Julian	Dunedin City Royals	Home	14'	0–2	0–5	Coastal Spirit	25 August 2024
18	(New Zealand) Aidan Kirby-Vaughan	University of Canterbury	Home	83'	1–2	1–2	Coastal Spirit	1 September 2024

== Qualified clubs ==
There are 10 men's National League Championship qualifying spots (4 for the Northern League, 3 plus Wellington Phoenix Reserves for the Central League and 2 for the Southern League).

Location of clubs in New Zealand for the 2024 National League season
Location of clubs in Auckland Region for the 2024 National League season
Location of clubs in Wellington Region for the 2024 National League season
Location of clubs in Christchurch Region for the 2024 National League season

Association	Team	Position in Regional League	App (last)	Previous best (last)
Northern League (4 berths)	Auckland City	1st	3rd (2023)	1st (2022)
Northern League (4 berths)	Western Springs	2nd	1st	Debut
Northern League (4 berths)	Eastern Suburbs	3rd	2nd (2023)	4th (2023)
Northern League (4 berths)	Birkenhead United	4th	2nd (2022)	4th (2022)
Central League (3 berths)	Wellington Olympic	1st	3rd (2023)	1st (2023)
Central League (3 berths)	Western Suburbs	2nd	1st	Debut
Central League (3 berths)	Napier City Rovers	3rd	3rd (2023)	8th (2022)
Southern League (2 berths)	Cashmere Technical	1st	3rd (2023)	5th (2023)
Southern League (2 berths)	Coastal Spirit	2nd	1st	Debut
Wellington Phoenix (automatic berth)	Wellington Phoenix Reserves	Automatic qualification	3rd (2023)	6th (2022)

=== Location ===
Team	Home ground	Location	2023 season
Auckland City	Kiwitea Street	Sandringham, Auckland	2nd
Birkenhead United	Shepherds Park	Beach Haven, Auckland	—N/a
Cashmere Technical	Ngā Puna Wai (Note: Played two matches at English Park)	Aidanfield, Christchurch	5th
Coastal Spirit	Linfield Park (Note: Played one match at Ferrymead Park)	Linwood, Christchurch	—N/a
Eastern Suburbs	Madills Farm	Kohimarama, Auckland	4th
Napier City Rovers	Bluewater Stadium	Poraiti, Napier	9th
Wellington Olympic	Martin Luckie Park	Berhampore, Wellington	1st
Wellington Phoenix Reserves	Fraser Park	Taitā, Lower Hutt	8th
Western Springs	Seddon Fields	Westmere, Auckland	—N/a
Western Suburbs	Endeavour Park	Whitby, Porirua	—N/a

=== Personnel ===
Team	Manager	Captain
Auckland City	(Spain) Albert Riera	(New Zealand) Mario Ilich
Birkenhead United	(England) Paul Hobson	(New Zealand) Luke Jorgensen
Cashmere Technical	(England) Dan Schwarz	(England) Tom Schwarz
Coastal Spirit	(New Zealand) Robbie Stanton	(New Zealand) Joe Hoole
Eastern Suburbs	(Republic of Ireland) Brian Shelley (interim)	(New Zealand) Adam Thomas
Napier City Rovers	(England) Bill Robertson	(England) Jim Hoyle
Wellington Olympic	(New Zealand) Ekow Quainoo	(Cook Islands) Ben Mata
Wellington Phoenix Reserves	(England) Chris Greenacre	(England) David Ball
Western Springs	(England) Scott Hales	(New Zealand) Oscar Ramsay
Western Suburbs	(South Africa) Alan Koch	(New Zealand) Finn Diamond

==== Managerial Changes ====
Team	Outgoing manager	Manner of departure	Date of vacancy	Position in the table	Incoming manager	Date of appointment
Eastern Suburbs	(New Zealand) Kane Wintersgill	Stepped down	2 October 2024	4th	(Republic of Ireland) Brian Shelley (interim)	2 October 2024

== Championship phase ==
=== League table ===
Pos	Team	Pld	W	D	L	GF	GA	GD	Pts	Qualification
1	Birkenhead United	9	6	2	1	23	16	+7	20	Qualification to Grand Final
2	Auckland City (C)	9	6	1	2	20	10	+10	19	Qualification to Grand Final and Champions League group stage
3	Western Springs	9	6	0	3	25	16	+9	18	
4	Napier City Rovers	9	5	2	2	21	14	+7	17	
5	Wellington Phoenix Reserves (Note: Wellington Phoenix Reserves can not qualify for the Grand Final.)	9	4	1	4	16	19	−3	13	
6	Wellington Olympic	9	3	2	4	17	15	+2	11	
7	Coastal Spirit	9	3	2	4	18	20	−2	11	
8	Cashmere Technical	9	2	3	4	16	18	−2	9	
9	Eastern Suburbs	9	1	2	6	8	17	−9	5	
10	Western Suburbs	9	1	1	7	9	28	−19	4	

Source: New Zealand Football
Rules for classification: 1) Points; 2) Goal difference; 3) Goals for; 4) Goals against; 5) Head to head; 6) Disciplinary record
(C) Champions

=== Results table ===
Home \ Away	AKC	BIR	CAS	CSP	EAS	NCR	WOP	WPX	WSP	WES
Auckland City		3–1	1–1	5–1				3–4	1–2	
Birkenhead United				2–1		4–2		4–2		3–3
Cashmere Technical		1–2		3–3	1–0		2–2	0–4		
Coastal Spirit					2–1	1–3	0–0			5–0
Eastern Suburbs	0–3	2–2				2–2			0–1	0–2
Napier City Rovers	0–1		2–1					1–1	4–0	
Wellington Olympic	0–1	1–2			4–1	2–3				4–1
Wellington Phoenix Reserves				0–3	0–2		3–1			2–0
Western Springs		1–3	4–3	6–2			2–3	5–0		
Western Suburbs	1–2		0–4			2–4			0–4	

Source: New Zealand Football
Legend: Blue = home team win; Yellow = draw; Red = away team win.

==== Positions by round ====
The table lists the positions of teams after each week of matches. To preserve chronological evolvements, any postponed matches are not included in the round at which they were originally scheduled, but added to the full round they were played immediately afterwards. For example, if a match is scheduled for round 3, but then postponed and played between rounds 6 and 7, it is added to the standings for round 6.

Team ╲ Round	1	2	3	4	5	6	7	8	9
Birkenhead United	7	8	6	3	2	2	2	1	1
Auckland City	3	1	1	1	1	1	3	2	2
Western Springs	10	5	9	4	7	5	4	3	3
Napier City Rovers	1	2	2	5	4	4	1	4	4
Wellington Phoenix Reserves	8	4	3	8	8	7	7	5	5
Wellington Olympic	5	7	4	6	5	6	5	6	6
Coastal Spirit	6	10	5	2	3	3	6	7	7
Cashmere Technical	1	6	7	7	6	8	8	8	8
Eastern Suburbs	4	3	8	9	9	9	9	9	9
Western Suburbs	9	9	10	10	10	10	10	10	10

Leader and Grand Final
Grand Final

Source: New Zealand Football

=== Grand Final ===
Sunday, 1 December 2024
16:00 NZDT

Birkenhead United	1–2 (a.e.t.)	Auckland City
Patterson 23'	Report	Jorgensen 44' (o.g.); Kilkolly 111'

North Harbour Stadium, Auckland
Attendance: 4,972
Referee: Calvin Berg

== Statistics ==
As of 1 December 2024

=== Top scorers ===
Rank	Player	Club	Goals
1	(New Zealand) Daniel Bunch	Birkenhead United	8
1	(Republic of Ireland) Garbhan Coughlan	Cashmere Technical	8
1	(New Zealand) Monty Patterson	Birkenhead United	8
4	(New Zealand) Myer Bevan	Auckland City	7
5	(New Zealand) Oscar Faulds	Napier City Rovers	6
5	(United States) Alex Steinwascher	Coastal Spirit	6
5	(New Zealand) David Yoo	Coastal Spirit	6
8	(New Zealand) Matthew Ellis	Western Springs	5
8	(New Zealand) Angus Kilkolly	Auckland City	5
10	(New Zealand) Adam Hewson	Napier City Rovers	4
10	(New Zealand) Jacob Mechell	Eastern Suburbs	4
10	(New Zealand) Hamish Watson	Wellington Olympic	4

=== Hat-tricks ===
Round	Player	For	Against	Home/Away	Result	Date
3	(New Zealand) David Yoo	Coastal Spirit	Western Suburbs	Home	5–0	13 October 2024
4	(United States) Alex Steinwascher	Coastal Spirit	Wellington Phoenix Reserves	Away	0–3	19 October 2024
5	(New Zealand) Monty Patterson	Birkenhead United	Wellington Phoenix Reserves	Home	4–2	27 October 2024
9	(New Zealand) Myer Bevan	Auckland City	Coastal Spirit	Home	5–1	24 November 2024

=== Discipline ===
==== Player ====
- Most yellow cards: 4
  - (New Zealand) Riley Grover (Coastal Spirit)
  - (New Zealand) Kieran Richards (Napier City Rovers)
- Most red cards: 1
  - 10 players

==== Club ====
- Most red cards: 3
  - Eastern Suburbs
- Fewest red cards: 0
  - Auckland City
  - Cashmere Technical
  - Wellington Phoenix Reserves

== Awards ==
=== Goal of the Week ===
Regional Phase

Goal of the Week
Week	Player	Club	Ref.
1	(Colombia) Jerson Lagos	Manurewa	
2	(New Zealand) Isaac Bates	Melville United	
3	(United States) Charles Ostrem	Western Suburbs	
4	(New Zealand) Callum Simmonds	East Coast Bays	
5	(New Zealand) Lachlan Candy	Waterside Karori	
6	(New Zealand) Gabriel Sloane-Rodrigues	Wellington Phoenix Reserves	
7	(New Zealand) Corban Piper	Birkenhead United	
8	(New Zealand) Haris Zeb	Birkenhead United	
9	(New Zealand) Henry Lenihan-Geels	Island Bay United	
10	(New Zealand) Albie Francis-Alles	Western Suburbs	
11	(Chile) Ronaldo Munoz	Hamilton Wanderers	
12	(New Zealand) Sam Lack	Napier City Rovers	
13	(New Zealand) Isaac Snell	Petone	
14	Quarter-Finals of the Kate Sheppard Cup's goals won		
15	(New Zealand) Isaac Bates	Melville United	
16	(New Zealand) Sam Lack	Napier City Rovers	
17	Semi-Finals of Chatham Cup's goals won		
18	(South Africa) Aidan Barbour-Ryan	Cashmere Technical	
19	(New Zealand) Sean Leadley	Melville United	
20	(New Zealand) Joel Stevens	Christchurch United	
21	(New Zealand) Todd Vermeir	University of Canterbury	
22	(Republic of Ireland) Garbhan Coughlan	Cashmere Technical	

Championship Phase

Goal of the Week
Week	Player	Club	Ref.
1	(New Zealand) Oscar Faulds	Napier City Rovers	
2	(New Zealand) Gabriel Sloane-Rodrigues	Wellington Phoenix Reserves	
3	(New Zealand) Daniel Bunch	Birkenhead United	
4	(England) Miles Palmer	Birkenhead United	
5	(New Zealand) Lachlan Candy	Wellington Phoenix Reserves	
6	(New Zealand) Adam Hewson	Napier City Rovers	
7	(New Zealand) Jordan Annear	Napier City Rovers	
8	(New Zealand) Lewis Partridge	Wellington Phoenix Reserves	
9	(New Zealand) Kieran Richards	Napier City Rovers	

=== Annual awards ===
League	MVP	Club	Top scorer	Club
Northern League	(New Zealand) Jake Mechell	Eastern Suburbs	(New Zealand) Jake Mechell	Eastern Suburbs
Central League	(Argentina) Tomas Alvarado	Waterside Karori	(New Zealand) Oscar Faulds	Napier City Rovers
Southern League	(New Zealand) David Yoo	Christchurch United	(Republic of Ireland) Garbhan Coughlan	Cashmere Technical
National League	(New Zealand) Monty Patterson	Birkenhead United	(New Zealand) Daniel Bunch (Republic of Ireland) Garbhan Coughlan (New Zealand) Monty Patterson	Birkenhead United; Cashmere Technical; Birkenhead United

Award	Winner	Club
Best Goal of the Regional Phase	(New Zealand) Sean Leadley	Melville United

Team of the season
Goalkeeper	(New Zealand) Conor Tracey (Auckland City)			
Defenders	(New Zealand) Matthew Jones (Napier City Rovers)		(New Zealand) Dina Botica (Birkenhead United)	(New Zealand) Michael den Heijer (Auckland City)
Midfielders	(New Zealand) David Yoo (Coastal Spirit)	(New Zealand) Mario Ilich (Auckland City)	(New Zealand) Adam Hewson (Napier City Rovers)	(New Zealand) Matthew Ellis (Western Springs)
Forwards	(New Zealand) Daniel Bunch (Birkenhead United)		(New Zealand) Monty Patterson (Birkenhead United)	(Republic of Ireland) Garbhan Coughlan (Cashmere Technical)
