= 2023 New Zealand National League =

Football championship

New Zealand National League
- Season: 2023
- Dates: 24 March – 26 November 2023
- Champions: Wellington Olympic
- OFC Champions League: Auckland City; Wellington Olympic
- Matches: 46
- Goals: 189 (4.11 per match)
- Top goalscorer: Gianni Bouzouzkis; Garbhan Coughlan (11 goals each)
- Biggest home win: Wellington Olympic 7–1 Napier City Rovers (30 September 2023)
- Biggest away win: Napier City Rovers 0–5 Eastern Suburbs (11 November 2023)
- Highest scoring: Manurewa 4–6 Wellington Phoenix Reserves (8 October 2023)
- Longest winning run: 7 matches Auckland City
- Longest unbeaten run: 9 matches Wellington Olympic
- Longest winless run: 9 matches Petone
- Longest losing run: 6 matches Petone

The 2023 New Zealand Men's National League was the third season of the National League since its restructuring in 2021. 32 clubs compete in the competition, with four qualifying from the Northern League, three qualifying from the Central League and two qualifying from the Southern League for the National Championship phase. Each team can field a maximum of four foreign players as well as one additional foreign player who has Oceania Football Confederation nationality. Over the course of the season, each team must also ensure players aged 20 or under account for 10% of available playing minutes.

== Qualifying leagues ==
=== 2023 Northern League ===
Northern League
- Season: 2023
- Dates: 24 March 2023 - 2 September 2023
- Champions: Auckland City
- Relegated: Takapuna; Manukau United
- Matches: 132
- Goals: 480 (3.64 per match)
- Top goalscorer: Ryan de Vries; Derek Tieku (19 goals each)
- Biggest home win: Auckland City 7–0 Manurewa (28 June 2023)
- Biggest away win: Manukau United 0–7 Birkenhead United (1 April 2023)
- Highest scoring: Birkenhead United 4–4 Hamilton Wanderers (2 September 2023)

Auckland City won the title for the third consecutive season on the final day beating Manukau United 6–1. This was Auckland City's third season in the Northern League, winning the title each of those seasons. Both Auckland City and Eastern Suburbs completed the Northern League season undefeated. This was the first season two clubs had gone undefeated in the Northern League. It was only the second time a team had gone undefeated since Eastern Suburbs did so in 1965, the first season of the NRFL Premier League.

Heading into the final day of the season, no team had been mathematically relegated. The matchday started with Bay Olympic and Manukau United in the relegation zone with Takapuna three points ahead in the last safe spot. Bay Olympic bettered Takapuna's goal difference by three and Manukau's by ten.

Manukau lost 6–1 away to Auckland City and were subsequently relegated. Takapuna, the only side to have their fate completely in their own hands, lost 3–2 at West Coast Rangers. Bay Olympic, hosting Manurewa equalized from the spot in the 84th minute and were looking like going down until, they found a winner in the first minute of stoppage time. This meant they relegated Takapuna on goal difference after finishing level on points.

==== Northern League teams ====
Twelve teams are competing in the league – the top ten teams from the previous season and the two teams promoted from the 2022 NRFL Division 1. The promoted teams are West Coast Rangers and Manurewa. It is Manurewa's first and West Coast Rangers second season (after relegation in 2021) in the National League. They replaced Waiheke United (relegated after their debut season on the Northern League) and North Shore United (relegated after a two-year Northern League spell).

Team	Home ground	Location	2022 season
Auckland City	Kiwitea Street	Sandringham, Auckland	1st
Auckland United	Keith Hay Park	Mount Roskill, Auckland	3rd
Bay Olympic	Olympic Park	New Lynn, Auckland	8th
Birkenhead United	Shepherds Park	Beach Haven, Auckland	2nd
Eastern Suburbs	Madills Farm	Kohimarama, Auckland	10th
Hamilton Wanderers	Porritt Stadium	Chartwell, Hamilton	5th
Manukau United	Centre Park	Māngere East, Auckland	7th
Manurewa	Jellicoe Park	Manurewa, Auckland	2nd in Division 1 (promoted)
Melville United	Gower Park	Melville, Hamilton	4th
Takapuna	Taharoto Park	Takapuna, Auckland	9th
West Coast Rangers	Fred Taylor Park	Whenuapai, Auckland	1st in Division 1 (promoted)
Western Springs	Seddon Fields	Westmere, Auckland	6th

==== Northern League personnel ====
Team	Manager	Captain
Auckland City	(Spain) Albert Riera	(New Zealand) Cam Howieson
Auckland United	(England) José Figueira	(New Zealand) Ross Haviland
Bay Olympic	(Czech Republic) Rudy Mozr	(New Zealand) Callum McNeill
Birkenhead United	(England) Paul Hobson	(New Zealand) Luke Jorgensen
Eastern Suburbs	(New Zealand) Kane Wintersgill	(New Zealand) Adam Thomas
Hamilton Wanderers	(Wales) Joseph Hinds	(Ghana) Derek Tieku
Manukau United	(South Africa) Tashreeq Davids	(New Zealand) Hayden Johns
Manurewa	(New Zealand) Paul Marshall	
Melville United	(New Zealand) Jarrod Young	(New Zealand) Aaron Scott
Takapuna	(New Zealand) Chris Milicich	(New Zealand) Connor Cahil-Fahey
West Coast Rangers	(New Zealand) Chad Coombes	(Malaysia) Dev Pokhrel
Western Springs	(England) Scott Hales	(New Zealand) Oscar Ramsay

==== Managerial changes ====
Team	Outgoing manager	Manner of departure	Date of vacancy	Position in the table	Incoming manager	Date of appointment
Eastern Suburbs	(New Zealand) Hoani Edwards	End of contract		Pre-season	(New Zealand) Kane Wintersgill	
Western Springs	(New Zealand) Chris Zoricich	Mutual consent	1 October 2022	Pre-season	(England) Scott Hales	5 January 2023
Bay Olympic	(New Zealand) Liam Mulrooney	Stepped down	26 October 2022	Pre-season	(Czech Republic) Rudy Mozr	10 November 2022
Manukau United	(Czech Republic) Rudy Mozr	Signed by Bay Olympic	10 November 2022	Pre-season	(Spain) Juan Roman	14 December 2022
Manurewa	(New Zealand) Rhys Ruka	Resigned (Note: Official reasoning by Manurewa AFC.)	19 March 2023 (Note: Officially announced on 29 March 2023.)	Pre-season	(New Zealand) Paul Marshall	20 March 2023
Manukau United	(Spain) Juan Roman	No reason given	May 2023	11th	(South Africa) Thabiso Tleane	May 2023
Manukau United	(South Africa) Thabiso Tleane	No reason given	26 June 2023	12th	(South Africa) Tashreeq Davids	26 June 2023

==== Northern League table ====
Pos	Team	Pld	W	D	L	GF	GA	GD	Pts	Qualification
1	Auckland City (C)	22	19	3	0	64	9	+55	60	Winner of Northern League and qualification to National League Championship
2	Eastern Suburbs	22	17	5	0	51	17	+34	56	Qualification to National League Championship
3	Auckland United	22	13	4	5	50	24	+26	43	Qualification to National League Championship
4	Manurewa	22	11	3	8	46	37	+9	36	Qualification to National League Championship
5	Western Springs	22	10	3	9	39	35	+4	33	
6	Hamilton Wanderers	22	8	6	8	39	49	−10	30	
7	West Coast Rangers	22	8	2	12	33	49	−16	26	
8	Birkenhead United	22	7	4	11	46	44	+2	25	
9	Melville United	22	6	5	11	30	47	−17	23	
10	Bay Olympic	22	4	3	15	33	55	−22	15	
11	Takapuna (R)	22	4	3	15	23	50	−27	15	Relegation to NRFL Championship
12	Manukau United (R)	22	3	3	16	26	64	−38	12	Relegation to NRFL Championship

Rules for classification: 1) Points; 2) Goal difference; 3) Goals scored; 4) Goals against; 5) Head to head; 6) Disciplinary record; 7) Coin toss
(C) Champions; (R) Relegated

==== Northern League results table ====
Home \ Away	AC	AU	BO	BU	ES	HW	MAN	MR	MEL	TP	WC	WS
Auckland City	—	2–1	5–1	5–1	0–0	2–0	6–1	7–0	3–1	4–0	1–1	4–0
Auckland United	0–2	—	4–1	3–3	0–1	4–0	3–0	1–1	4–0	1–0	4–0	1–1
Bay Olympic	0–1	1–2	—	2–4	2–4	1–3	3–2	2–1	1–1	2–3	4–2	2–3
Birkenhead United	0–2	0–3	3–0	—	0–2	4–4	2–3	2–4	2–0	5–0	2–0	1–2
Eastern Suburbs	2–2	2–2	1–1	2–0	—	6–1	1–0	4–3	2–1	1–0	2–1	2–0
Hamilton Wanderers	0–2	0–1	3–1	2–2	1–1	—	2–1	3–3	1–1	1–0	3–2	3–2
Manukau United	0–5	1–4	3–3	0–7	0–6	2–2	—	0–1	2–1	0–2	3–4	1–2
Manurewa	0–2	0–2	1–0	1–3	0–3	4–1	3–0	—	5–0	0–0	5–1	1–0
Melville United	0–1	1–5	3–2	1–1	0–1	2–4	1–0	5–2	—	1–1	3–1	2–1
Takapuna	0–2	3–4	1–2	3–2	2–5	2–3	2–2	0–4	0–1	—	2–1	0–3
West Coast Rangers	0–3	1–0	2–1	2–1	1–2	3–1	1–3	0–4	5–2	3–2	—	1–1
Western Springs	1–3	4–1	3–1	3–1	0–1	3–1	3–2	1–3	3–3	3–0	0–1	—

Source: Soccerway
Legend: Blue = home team win; Yellow = draw; Red = away team win.

==== Northern League scoring ====
===== Northern League top scorers =====
Rank	Player	Club	Goals
1	(Ghana) Derek Tieku	Hamilton Wanderers	19
1	(New Zealand) Ryan de Vries	Auckland City	19
3	(New Zealand) Monty Patterson	Manurewa	13
4	(New Zealand) Joshua Redfearn	Auckland United	12
5	(New Zealand) Allan Pearce	West Coast Rangers	11
6	(Argentina) Nicolas Bobadilla	Manurewa	10
6	(Uruguay) Martín Bueno	Eastern Suburbs	10
6	(Germany) Ibrahim Nadir	Bay Olympic	10
9	(New Zealand) Luke Jorgensen	Birkenhead United	9
10	(New Zealand) Reid Drake	Western Springs	8
10	(New Zealand) Liam Gillion	Auckland City	8
10	(New Zealand) Jacob Mechell	Eastern Suburbs	8

===== Northern League hat-tricks =====
Round	Player	For	Against	Home/Away	Result	Date
7	(Argentina) Nicolas Bobadilla	Manurewa	Hamilton Wanderers	Away	3–3	29 April 2023
7	(Ghana) Derek Tieku	Hamilton Wanderers	Manurewa	Home	3–3	29 April 2023
12	(New Zealand) Joshua Redfearn	Auckland United	Takapuna	Away	3–4	3 June 2023
13	(New Zealand) Monty Patterson	Manurewa	West Coast Rangers	Away	0–4	10 June 2023
11	(New Zealand) Ryan de Vries	Auckland City	Manukau United	Away	0–5	14 June 2023
14	(New Zealand) Allan Pearce	West Coast Rangers	Manukau United	Away	3–4	14 June 2023
10	(New Zealand) Ryan de Vries	Auckland City	Manurewa	Home	7–0	28 June 2023
15	(Uruguay) Martín Bueno	Eastern Suburbs	Hamilton Wanderers	Home	6–1	1 July 2023
22	(New Zealand) Ryan de Vries	Auckland City	Manukau United	Home	6–1	2 September 2023

=== 2023 Central League ===
Central League
- Season: 2023
- Dates: 25 March 2023 – 2 September 2023
- Champions: Wellington Olympic
- Relegated: Whanganui Athletic
- Matches: 90
- Goals: 419 (4.66 per match)
- Top goalscorer: Matthew Brazier (18 goals)
- Biggest home win: Wellington Olympic 7–0 North Wellington (29 April 2023)
- Biggest away win: Miramar Rangers 0–7 Wellington Olympic (10 June 2023); Whanganui Athletic 0–7 Wellington Olympic (1 July 2023)
- Highest scoring: Wellington Olympic 8–3 Western Suburbs (2 September 2023)

==== Central League teams ====
Ten teams are competing in the league – the top nine teams from the previous season and the one team promoted from the 2022 play-off between the winners of the Central Federation League and the Capital Premier. The winner of the play-off was Stop Out. This is their first season in the Central League, since New Zealand football’s restructuring in 2021. They replaced Havelock North Wanderers (relegated to the Capital Premier League after one season in the Central League). Wellington United was entered as one of the originally 10 teams to play the 2023 season but withdrew in 2022. They were replaced by Whanganui Athletic who had originally missed out on promotion to Stop Out.

Team	Home ground	Location	2022 season
Miramar Rangers	David Farrington Park	Miramar, Wellington	2nd
Napier City Rovers	Bluewater Stadium	Napier	4th
North Wellington	Alex Moore Park	Johnsonville, Wellington	7th
Petone	Memorial Park	Petone, Lower Hutt	6th
Stop Out	Hutt Park	Lower Hutt	1st in Capital Premier (promoted via play-offs)
Waterside Karori	Karori Park	Karori, Wellington	5th
Wellington Olympic	Wakefield Park	Wellington	1st
Wellington Phoenix Reserves	Fraser Park	Lower Hutt	3rd
Western Suburbs	Endeavour Park	Porirua	9th
Whanganui Athletic	Wembley Park	Whanganui East, Whanganui	Replaced Wellington United after they withdrew

==== Central League personnel ====
Team	Manager	Captain
Miramar Rangers	(New Zealand) Kale Herbert	(England) Sam Mason-Smith
Napier City Rovers	(England) Bill Robertson	(England) Jim Hoyle
North Wellington	(Croatia) Davor Tavich	(Canada) Gavin Hoy
Petone	(New Zealand) Ryan Edwards	(New Zealand) Hami Paranihi-Nuku
Stop Out	(Italy) Aston Hughes	(Poland) Maxim Johnson
Waterside Karori	(New Zealand) Sam Morrissey	(England) Harry Fautley
Wellington Olympic	(New Zealand) Rupert Kemeys	(Cook Islands) Ben Mata
Wellington Phoenix Reserves	(England) Chris Greenacre	(New Zealand) Isaac Hughes
Western Suburbs	(South Africa) Alan Koch	(Canada) Malik Smith
Whanganui Athletic	(England) Matty Calvert	(England) Ryan Holden

==== Central League table ====
Pos	Team	Pld	W	D	L	GF	GA	GD	Pts	Qualification
1	Wellington Olympic (C)	18	14	3	1	71	28	+43	45	Winner of Central League and qualification to National League Championship
2	Wellington Phoenix Reserves (Note: Wellington Phoenix Reserves gain automatic entry into the National League Championship phase due to the A-League Men requirements.)	18	12	1	5	47	29	+18	37	Qualification to National League Championship
3	Napier City Rovers	18	10	3	5	50	32	+18	33	Qualification to National League Championship
4	Petone	18	10	2	6	45	33	+12	32	Qualification to National League Championship
5	Western Suburbs	18	9	4	5	39	26	+13	31	
6	Waterside Karori	18	7	3	8	44	40	+4	24	
7	Miramar Rangers	18	8	0	10	37	43	−6	24	
8	Stop Out	18	7	3	8	37	47	−10	24	
9	North Wellington	18	2	1	15	21	63	−42	7	
10	Whanganui Athletic (R)	18	1	2	15	19	69	−50	5	Relegation to Central Federation League

Source: Capital Football
Rules for classification: 1) Points; 2) Goal difference; 3) Goals scored; 4) Goals against; 5) Head to head; 6) Disciplinary record; 7) Coin toss
(C) Champions; (R) Relegated

==== Central League results table ====
Home \ Away	MR	NC	NW	PT	SO	WK	WO	WP	WS	WA
Miramar Rangers	—	1–3	3–0	2–3	3–0	3–4	0–7	0–4	1–0	5–1
Napier City Rovers	1–2	—	3–1	2–2	4–1	5–0	1–4	2–3	2–2	1–1
North Wellington	2–5	1–3	—	0–5	3–3	1–4	0–5	0–4	1–3	2–3
Petone	4–3	4–2	3–0	—	2–1	2–2	0–0	1–3	2–3	2–0
Stop Out	4–2	1–3	3–1	2–1	—	1–4	3–3	3–3	0–4	3–1
Waterside Karori	1–2	0–3	5–1	4–3	2–3	—	1–2	1–3	2–2	3–1
Wellington Olympic	3–1	6–3	7–0	4–2	6–3	2–2	—	3–2	0–2	6–1
Wellington Phoenix Reserves	3–1	1–4	2–3	3–1	2–0	3–2	1–2	—	0–1	4–1
Western Suburbs	3–1	1–3	2–0	0–1	3–3	2–1	2–5	1–2	—	7–1
Whanganui Athletic	0–2	1–5	0–5	2–3	1–3	1–6	0–7	3–4	1–1	—

Source: Soccerway
Legend: Blue = home team win; Yellow = draw; Red = away team win.

==== Central League scoring ====
===== Central League top scorers =====
Rank	Player	Club	Goals
1	(New Zealand) Matthew Brazier	Petone	18
2	(England) Deri Corfe	Napier City Rovers	15
3	(New Zealand) Jack-Henry Sinclair	Wellington Olympic	14
4	(New Zealand) Joshua Tollervey	Wellington Phoenix Reserves	13
4	(New Zealand) Hamish Watson	Wellington Olympic	13
6	(New Zealand) Tomas Alvarado	Waterside Karori	11
6	(England) Kailan Gould	Wellington Olympic	11
6	(Cook Islands) Benjamin Mata	Wellington Olympic	11
9	(Canada) Kairo Coore	Western Suburbs	10
9	(New Zealand) Ryan Feutz	Western Suburbs	10
9	(England) Jonathan McNamara	Napier City Rovers	10

===== Central League hat-tricks =====
Round	Player	For	Against	Home/Away	Result	Date
2	(New Zealand) Joshua Tollervey (Note: Player scored 4 goals)	Wellington Phoenix Reserves	Whanganui Athletic	Away	3–4	2 April 2023
4	(New Zealand) Merlin Luke-Miny	Wellington Olympic	Whanganui Athletic	Home	6–1	15 April 2023
5	(New Zealand) Josh Rudland	Wellington Phoenix Reserves	North Wellington	Away	0–4	22 April 2023
5	(New Zealand) Jack-Henry Sinclair	Wellington Olympic	Petone	Home	4–2	22 April 2023
6	(New Zealand) Hamish Watson	Wellington Olympic	North Wellington	Home	7–0	29 April 2023
7	(New Zealand) Matthew Brazier	Petone	North Wellington	Away	0–5	6 May 2023
8	(New Zealand) Hamish Watson	Wellington Olympic	Napier City Rovers	Home	6–3	20 May 2023
10	(New Zealand) Gianni Bouzoukis	Wellington Olympic	Miramar Rangers	Away	0–7	10 June 2023
10	(New Zealand) Hamish Watson	Wellington Olympic	Miramar Rangers	Away	0–7	10 June 2023
11	(New Zealand) Nathan Simes	Miramar Rangers	North Wellington	Away	2–5	24 June 2023
12	(England) Jared Cunniff	Stop Out	Miramar Rangers	Home	4–2	1 July 2023
14	(New Zealand) Jack O'Connor	Petone	Wellington Olympic	Home	4–0	22 July 2023
18	(New Zealand) Joshua Tollervey	Wellington Phoenix Reserves	Miramar Rangers	Away	0–4	2 September 2023
18	(Canada) Gavin Hoy	Wellington Olympic	Western Suburbs	Home	8–3	2 September 2023
18	(Ethiopia) Muse Abrahaberhe	Western Suburbs	Wellington Olympic	Away	8–3	2 September 2023

=== 2023 Southern League ===
Southern League
- Season: 2023
- Dates: 24 March 2023 - 3 September 2023
- Champions: Christchurch United
- Relegated: Green Island
- Matches: 90
- Goals: 392 (4.36 per match)
- Top goalscorer: Samuel Phillips (29)
- Biggest home win: Nelson Suburbs 7–1 Selwyn United (11 June 2023); Christchurch United 6–0 Selwyn United (14 July 2023)
- Biggest away win: Green Island 3–15 Christchurch United (27 August 2023)
- Highest scoring: Green Island 3–15 Christchurch United (27 August 2023)
- Longest winning run: 8 matches Christchurch United
- Longest unbeaten run: 17 matches Christchurch United
- Longest winless run: 11 matches Selwyn United
- Longest losing run: 9 matches Selwyn United

==== Southern League teams ====
Ten teams are competing in the league – the top nine teams from the previous season and the winner of the Southern League play-offs. The promoted team is FC Twenty 11. This is their first season in the Southern League. They replaced Mosgiel (relegated after their debut season in the Southern League).

Team	Home ground	Location	2022 season
Cashmere Technical	Garrick Memorial Park	Woolston, Christchurch	2nd
Christchurch United	United Sports Centre	Yaldhurst, Christchurch	1st
Coastal Spirit	Linfield Park	Linwood, Christchurch	6th
Dunedin City Royals	Football Turf	Dunedin North	4th
FC Twenty 11	Avonhead Park	Avonhead, Christchurch	1st in Mainland Premier League (promoted via play-offs)
Ferrymead Bays	Ferrymead Park	Ferrymead, Christchurch	5th
Green Island	Sunnyvale Park	Green Island, Dunedin	8th
Nelson Suburbs	Saxton Field	Nelson	3rd
Nomads United	Tulett Park	Casebrook, Christchurch	7th
Selwyn United	Foster Park	Rolleston	9th

==== Southern League personnel ====
Team	Manager	Captain
Cashmere Technical	(England) Dan Schwarz	(New Zealand) Andrew Storer
Christchurch United	(Barbados) Paul Ifill	(New Zealand) Matt Tod-Smith
Coastal Spirit	(New Zealand) Robbie Stanton	(New Zealand) Dominic McGarr
Dunedin City Royals	(New Zealand) Richard Murray	(New Zealand) Jared Grove
FC Twenty 11	(Bulgaria) Cvetan Ivanov	(New Zealand) Harrison Rowe
Ferrymead Bays	(New Zealand) Alan Walker	(Republic of Ireland) James Deehan
Green Island	(New Zealand) Jamie Whitmarsh	(New Zealand) Thomas Milton
Nelson Suburbs	(Northern Ireland) Ryan Stewart	(New Zealand) Alex Ridsdale
Nomads United	(New Zealand) Matthew Jansen	(New Zealand) Jacob Anderson
Selwyn United	(New Zealand) Lee Padmore	(New Zealand) Jack Allatt

==== Southern League table ====
Pos	Team	Pld	W	D	L	GF	GA	GD	Pts	Qualification
1	Christchurch United (C)	18	16	1	1	72	12	+60	49	Winner of Southern League and qualification to National League Championship
2	Cashmere Technical	18	13	3	2	66	27	+39	42	Qualification to National League Championship
3	Coastal Spirit	18	10	1	7	30	36	−6	31	
4	Dunedin City Royals	18	8	5	5	44	29	+15	29	
5	Ferrymead Bays	18	9	2	7	35	36	−1	29	
6	Nelson Suburbs	18	7	4	7	48	46	+2	25	
7	Nomads United	18	7	2	9	32	35	−3	23	
8	Green Island (R)	18	5	1	12	33	58	−25	16	Relegated to the FootballSouth Premier League (Note: Green Island were relegated due to withdrawing from the 2024 Southern League.)
9	Selwyn United	18	3	1	14	21	53	−32	10	
10	FC Twenty 11	18	2	0	16	11	60	−49	6	

Source: Mainland Football
Rules for classification: 1) Points; 2) Goal difference; 3) Goals scored; 4) Goals against; 5) Head to head; 6) Disciplinary record; 7) Coin toss
(C) Champions; (R) Relegated

==== Southern League results table ====
Home \ Away	CT	CU	CS	DC	FT	FB	GI	NS	NU	SU
Cashmere Technical	—	1–1	2–3	2–3	6–1	2–2	2–1	5–4	7–3	3–1
Christchurch United	1–3	—	2–0	5–2	1–0	3–0	3–0	4–0	1–0	6–0
Coastal Spirit	1–1	0–4	—	1–0	2–0	1–3	3–2	2–3	2–1	3–1
Dunedin City Royals	1–4	1–3	5–0	—	3–0	2–1	4–2	3–3	3–0	1–1
FC Twenty 11	0–6	0–5	1–4	0–7	—	3–0	0–3	0–6	0–2	0–1
Ferrymead Bays	2–6	0–6	3–0	4–1	6–1	—	2–1	1–1	0–2	1–0
Green Island	0–7	3–15	0–1	1–1	2–0	1–2	—	3–4	1–2	4–1
Nelson Suburbs	1–4	1–6	5–0	1–1	3–1	2–1	4–5	—	1–1	7–1
Nomads United	1–3	1–4	1–4	1–1	0–2	1–2	6–2	4–1	—	3–1
Selwyn United	1–2	0–2	2–3	0–5	3–2	3–5	1–2	4–1	0–3	—

Source: Soccerway
Legend: Blue = home team win; Yellow = draw; Red = away team win.

==== Southern League scoring ====
As of 3 September 2023

===== Southern League top scorers =====
Rank	Player	Club	Goals
1	(New Zealand) Sam Philip	Christchurch United	29
2	(Republic of Ireland) Garbhan Coughlan	Cashmere Technical	28
3	(Republic of Ireland) Eoghan Stokes	Christchurch United	15
4	(New Zealand) Connor Neil	Dunedin City Royals	12
5	(New Zealand) Benjamin Stanley	Dunedin City Royals	11
6	(Canada) Stefan Milidrag	Green Island	9
7	(New Zealand) Aidan Barbour-Ryan	Cashmere Technical	8
7	(New Zealand) Omar Cameron	Coastal Spirit	8
7	(New Zealand) Liam Cotter	Coastal Spirit	8
7	(Australia) Daniel MacLennan	Christchurch United	8
7	(New Zealand) Ben Polak	Nelson Suburbs	8
7	(New Zealand) Alex Ridsdale	Nelson Suburbs	8

===== Southern League hat-tricks =====
Round	Player	For	Against	Home/Away	Result	Date
1	(Republic of Ireland) Garbhan Coughlan (Note: Player scored 4 goals)	Cashmere Technical	FC Twenty 11	Away	0–6	25 March 2023
2	(New Zealand) Sam Philip	Christchurch United	Coastal Spirit	Away	0–4	2 April 2023
3	(Republic of Ireland) Garbhan Coughlan	Cashmere Technical	Nomads United	Home	7–3	7 April 2023
6	(New Zealand) Sam Philip	Christchurch United	Ferrymead Bays	Away	0–6	29 April 2023
6	(Republic of Ireland) Eoghan Stokes	Christchurch United	Ferrymead Bays	Away	0–6	29 April 2023
9	(Scotland) Connor Gillespie	Nelson Suburbs	FC Twenty 11	Away	0-6	28 May 2023
10	(New Zealand) Aidan Barbour-Ryan	Cashmere Technical	FC Twenty 11	Home	6-1	10 June 2023
10	(Scotland) Connor Gillespie	Nelson Suburbs	Selwyn United	Home	7-1	11 June 2023
11	(Republic of Ireland) Garbhan Coughlan	Cashmere Technical	Nelson Suburbs	Home	5–4	24 June 2023
12	(Republic of Ireland) Garbhan Coughlan	Cashmere Technical	Green Island	Away	0–7	1 July 2023
13	(Canada) Stefan Milidrag	Green Island	Nelson Suburbs	Away	4–5	15 July 2023
15	(Australia) Daniel MacLennan	Christchurch United	Ferrymead Bays	Home	3–0	6 August 2023
16	(New Zealand) Sam Philip	Christchurch United	Nelson Suburbs	Away	1–6	13 August 2023
16	(Republic of Ireland) Eoghan Stokes	Christchurch United	Nelson Suburbs	Away	1–6	13 August 2023
17	(New Zealand) Sam Philip (Note: Player scored 8 goals)	Christchurch United	Green Island	Away	3–15	27 August 2023
17	(Republic of Ireland) Eoghan Stokes	Christchurch United	Green Island	Away	3–15	27 August 2023

===== Own goals =====
Round	Player	Club	Against
2	(New Zealand) Jacob Anderson	Nomads United	Ferrymead Bays
15	(New Zealand) Jacob Anderson	Nomads United	Green Island
16	(New Zealand) Cameron Brewitt	Green Island	Selwyn United
17	(New Zealand) Alex Ridsdale	Nelson Suburbs	Nomads United
18	(New Zealand) Jack Allatt	Selwyn United	Nomads United

== Qualified clubs ==
There are 10 men’s National League Championship qualifying spots (4 for the Northern League, 3 plus Wellington Phoenix Reserves for the Central League and 2 for the Southern League).

Location of clubs in New Zealand for the 2023 National League season
Location of clubs in Auckland Region for the 2023 National League season
Location of clubs in Wellington Region for the 2023 National League season

Association	Team	Position in Regional League	App (last)	Previous best (last)
Northern League (4 berths)	Auckland City	1st	2nd (2022)	1st (2022)
Northern League (4 berths)	Eastern Suburbs	2nd	1st (Note: Debut under the new competition, but played the National League before as part of the New Zealand National Soccer League)	Debut (Note: Previously won the National League when playing in the New Zealand Football Championship)
Northern League (4 berths)	Auckland United	3rd	2nd (2022)	3rd (2022)
Northern League (4 berths)	Manurewa	4th	1st	Debut
Central League (3 berths)	Wellington Olympic	1st	2nd (2022)	2nd (2022)
Central League (3 berths)	Napier City Rovers	3rd	2nd (2022)	8th (2022)
Central League (3 berths)	Petone	4th (Note: Wellington Phoenix Reserves finished second but have automatic qualification.)	1st	Debut
Southern League (2 berths)	Christchurch United	1st	2nd (2022)	9th (Note: Previously won the National League when playing in the New Zealand National Soccer League) (2022)
Southern League (2 berths)	Cashmere Technical	2nd	2nd (2022)	7th (2022)
Wellington Phoenix (automatic berth)	Wellington Phoenix Reserves	Automatic qualification	2nd (2022)	6th (2022)

== Championship phase ==
=== League table ===
Pos	Team	Pld	W	D	L	GF	GA	GD	Pts	Qualification
1	Wellington Olympic (C)	9	7	2	0	34	15	+19	23	Qualification to Grand Final and Champions League National play-offs
2	Auckland City	9	7	0	2	19	12	+7	21	Qualification to Grand Final and Champions League National play-offs
3	Christchurch United	9	5	1	3	18	16	+2	16	
4	Eastern Suburbs	9	4	3	2	23	11	+12	15	
5	Cashmere Technical	9	4	1	4	24	24	0	13	
6	Manurewa	9	4	1	4	16	20	−4	13	
7	Auckland United	9	2	4	3	15	17	−2	10	
8	Wellington Phoenix Reserves (Note: Wellington Phoenix Reserves can not qualify for the Grand Final.)	9	3	0	6	19	24	−5	9	
9	Napier City Rovers	9	2	1	6	13	26	−13	7	
10	Petone	9	0	1	8	6	22	−16	1	

Source: New Zealand Football
Rules for classification: 1) Points; 2) Goal difference; 3) Goals for; 4) Goals against; 5) Head to head; 6) Disciplinary record
(C) Champions

=== Results table ===
Home \ Away	AC	AU	CT	CU	ES	MU	NC	PT	WO	WP
Auckland City		3–2	3–1	2–3		1–0			1–3	
Auckland United				2–2	1–1		3–3		1–3	3–4
Cashmere Technical		1–2					4–2		3–3	2–1
Christchurch United			2–4			1–2	2–1	3–0		2–0
Eastern Suburbs	1–2		5–1	0–1		3–0		1–1		
Manurewa		0–0	5–3						2–5	4–6
Napier City Rovers	2–4				0–5	0–1		3–0		
Petone	0–2	0–1	1–5			1–2				
Wellington Olympic				5–2	2–2		7–1	2–1		4–2
Wellington Phoenix Reserves	0–1				3–5		0–1	3–2		

Source: New Zealand Football
Legend: Blue = home team win; Yellow = draw; Red = away team win.

==== Positions by round ====
The table lists the positions of teams after each week of matches. To preserve chronological evolvements, any postponed matches are not included in the round at which they were originally scheduled, but added to the full round they were played immediately afterwards. For example, if a match is scheduled for round 3, but then postponed and played between rounds 6 and 7, it is added to the standings for round 6.

Team ╲ Round	1	2	3	4	5	6	7	8	9
Wellington Olympic	1	1	2	2	2	2	2	2	1
Auckland City	4	3	1	1	1	1	1	1	2
Christchurch United	4	2	3	4	3	3	3	4	3
Eastern Suburbs	7	7	8	7	8	7	5	5	4
Cashmere Technical	6	5	5	6	5	6	4	3	5
Manurewa	9	9	10	9	6	4	6	6	6
Auckland United	3	4	4	3	4	5	7	7	7
Wellington Phoenix Reserves	7	8	6	8	9	9	8	8	8
Napier City Rovers	2	6	7	5	7	8	9	9	9
Petone	10	10	9	10	10	10	10	10	10

Leader and Grand Final
Grand Final

Source: New Zealand Football

=== Grand Final ===
Sunday, 26 November 2023
13:00 NZDT

Wellington Olympic	2–0	Auckland City
Gould 58'; Sinclair 90+5'	Report

Mt Smart Stadium, Auckland
Referee: Nick Waldron

== Statistics ==
As of 19 November 2023

=== Top scorers ===
Rank	Player	Club	Goals
1	(New Zealand) Gianni Bouzouzkis	Wellington Olympic	11
1	(Republic of Ireland) Garbhan Coughlan	Cashmere Technical	11
3	(New Zealand) Angus Kilkolly	Auckland City	7
4	(England) Deri Corfe	Napier City Rovers	6
4	(New Zealand) Luis Toomey	Eastern Suburbs	6
6	(New Zealand) Kingsley Sinclair	Eastern Suburbs	5
7	(Canada) Gavin Hoy	Wellington Olympic	4
7	(New Zealand) Dylan Manickum	Auckland City	4
7	(South Africa) Lyle Matthysen	Cashmere Technical	4
7	(New Zealand) Jack-Henry Sinclair	Wellington Olympic	4
7	(New Zealand) Joshua Tollervey	Wellington Phoenix Reserves	4
7	(New Zealand) Nicolas Zombrano	Auckland United	4

==== Hat-tricks ====
Round	Player	For	Against	Home/Away	Result	Date
2	(New Zealand) Gianni Bouzoukis	Wellington Olympic	Napier City Rovers	Home	7–1	29 September 2023
2	(New Zealand) Jack-Henry Sinclair	Wellington Olympic	Napier City Rovers	Home	7–1	29 September 2023
7	(Republic of Ireland) Garbhan Coughlan	Cashmere Technical	Napier City Rovers	Home	4–2	5 November 2023
8	(Republic of Ireland) Garbhan Coughlan	Cashmere Technical	Christchurch United	Away	2–4	10 November 2023

=== Discipline ===
==== Player ====
- Most yellow cards: 5
  - (England) James Hoyle (Napier City Rovers)
- Most red cards: 1
  - 10 players

==== Club ====
- Most red cards: 3
  - Napier City Rovers
- Fewest red cards: 0
  - Auckland United
  - Eastern Suburbs
  - Petone
  - Wellington Phoenix Reserves

== Awards ==
=== Goal of the Week ===
The goal of the week for the 2023 season included goals from the 2023 New Zealand Women's National League.

Goal of the Week
Week	Player	Club	Ref.
1	(New Zealand) Edward Wilkinson	Christchurch United	
2	N/A		
3	(England) Liam Schofield	Napier City Rovers	
4	N/A		
5	(Argentina) Nicolas Bobadilla	Manurewa	
6	N/A		
7	(South Africa) Lyle Matthysen	Cashmere Technical	
8	(New Zealand) Ashnarv Mustapha	Petone	
9	(New Zealand) Oliver Pickering	Petone	

=== Annual awards ===
League	MVP	Club	Top scorer	Club
Northern League	(Ghana) Derek Tieku	Hamilton Wanderers	(New Zealand) Ryan de Vries (Ghana) Derek Tieku	Auckland City; Hamilton Wanderers
Central League	(New Zealand) Matthew Brazier	Petone	(New Zealand) Matthew Brazier	Petone
Southern League	(Republic of Ireland) Garbhan Coughlan	Cashmere Technical	(New Zealand) Sam Philip	Christchurch United
National League	(Republic of Ireland) Garbhan Coughlan	Cashmere Technical	(New Zealand) Gianni Bouzoukis (Republic of Ireland) Garbhan Coughlan	Wellington Olympic; Cashmere Technical

Award	Winner	Club
Goal of the Season	(New Zealand) Oliver Pickering	Petone

Team of the season
Goalkeeper	(New Zealand) Scott Basalaj (Wellington Olympic)			
Defenders	(New Zealand) Jack-Henry Sinclair (Wellington Olympic)	(New Zealand) Adam Thomas (Eastern Suburbs)	(Cook Islands) Ben Mata (Wellington Olympic)	(New Zealand) Francis de Vries (Eastern Suburbs)
Midfielders	(New Zealand) Luis Toomey (Eastern Suburbs)		(Japan) Hideto Takahashi (Auckland United)	(New Zealand) Cameron Howieson (Auckland City)
Forwards	(New Zealand) Gianni Bouzoukis (Wellington Olympic)		(Republic of Ireland) Garbhan Coughlan (Cashmere Technical)	(England) Deri Corfe (Napier City Rovers)
