= Kelvin Kalua =

New Zealand association football player

Personal information
- Date of birth: 10 July 1999 (age 27)
- Place of birth: Malawi
- Height: 1.80 m (5 ft 11 in)
- Positions: Full back; center back

Team information
- Current team: Eastern Suburbs
- Number: 4

Youth career
- 2010–2017: Ellerslie

Senior career*
Years	Team	Apps	(Gls)
2017–	Eastern Suburbs	123	(6)

International career^{‡}
2021	New Zealand	3	(0)
- * Club domestic league appearances and goals as of 14 October 2021 ‡ National team caps and goals as of 14 October 2021

Kelvin Kalua (born 10 July 1999) is a New Zealand footballer who plays as a defender for Eastern Suburbs and the New Zealand national team.

== Club career ==
A youth product of Ellerslie from 2010 to 2017, Kalua moved to Eastern Suburbs in the summer of 2017. He made his senior debut with Eastern Suburbs in a 2–0 New Zealand Football Championship win over Waitakere United on 17 December 2017. He helped the team win the 2018–19 New Zealand Football Championship.

== International career ==
Born in Malawi, Kalua moved to New Zealand in 2006 at the age of six and eventually became a citizen. He made his international debut with the New Zealand national team in a 2–1 friendly win over Curaçao on 9 October 2021.

== Career statistics ==
=== Club ===
Club	Season	League			Cup		Continental		Other		Total	
Club	Season	Division	Apps	Goals	Apps	Goals	Apps	Goals	Apps	Goals	Apps	Goals
Eastern Suburbs	2017–18	Premiership	11	0	—		—		1 (Note: Appearances in New Zealand Football Championship play-offs.)	0	12	0
Eastern Suburbs	2018–19	Premiership	17	0	—		—		2	0	19	0
Eastern Suburbs	2019–20	Premiership	14	1	—		3 (Note: Appearances in OFC Champions League.)	0	—		17	1
Eastern Suburbs	2020–21	Premiership	11	2	—		—		1	0	12	2
Eastern Suburbs	2021	National League	16	1	1	0	—		—		16	1
Eastern Suburbs	2022	National League	14	0	6	0	—		—		14	0
Eastern Suburbs	2023	National League	28	2	5	0	—		—		21	2
Eastern Suburbs	2024	National League	27	2	1	0	—		—		21	2
Eastern Suburbs	2025	National League	17	0	4	0	—		—		21	0
Eastern Suburbs	2026	National League	0	0	1	0	—		—		1	0
Career total			125	8	16	0	3	0	4	0	133	8

== Honours ==
Eastern Suburbs

- New Zealand Football Championship: 2018–19
