= Garbhan Coughlan =

Irish footballer (born 1993)

Personal information
- Date of birth: 24 January 1993 (age 33)
- Place of birth: Limerick, Ireland
- Height: 1.76 m (5 ft 9 in)
- Position: Striker

Team information
- Current team: Cashmere Technical
- Number: 10

Senior career*
Years	Team	Apps	(Gls)
2010–2014	Limerick	26	(4)
2013	→ Athlone Town (loan)	22	(5)
2014	Limerick	2	(0)
2015	Athlone Town	15	(4)
2016–2017	Limerick	26	(7)
2017–2020	Southern United	47	(29)
2018	Dunedin Technical	6	(2)
2019–	Cashmere Technical	142	(201)
2020–2021	Canterbury United	14	(6)
- * Club domestic league appearances and goals as of 12 September 2026

Garbhan Coughlan (born 24 January 1993) is an Irish footballer who plays as a striker for New Zealand National League team Cashmere Technical.

== Early life ==
Coughlan was born in 1993 in Ireland, where he also attended university. He grew up in Limerick, Ireland.

== Career ==
Coughlan started his career with Irish side Limerick. In 2013, he was sent on loan to Irish side Athlone Town.

== Style of play ==
Coughlan mainly operates as a striker. He is known for his speed.

== Personal life ==
Coughlan has worked as a youth manager. He is the brother of Irish footballer Ronan Coughlan.

== Career statistics ==
As of match played 12 September 2026

Appearances and goals by club, season and competition
Club	Season	League			Cup		League Cup		Other		Total	
Club	Season	Division	Apps	Goals	Apps	Goals	Apps	Goals	Apps	Goals	Apps	Goals
Limerick	2010	LOI First Division	8	2	2	0	0	0	—		10	2
Limerick	2011	LOI First Division	12	1	2	1	3	2	0	0	17	4
Limerick	2012	LOI First Division	7	1	1	0	2	2	0	0	10	3
Limerick	2013	LOI Premier Division	0	0	1	0	0	0	1 (Note: Appearances and goals in Munster Senior Cup)	0	2	0
Limerick	2014	LOI Premier Division	2	0	0	0	1	0	1	0	4	0
Limerick	Total		29	4	6	1	6	4	2	0	43	9
Athlone Town (loan)	2013	LOI First Division	22	5	0	0	0	0	—		22	5
Athlone Town	2015	LOI First Division	15	5	1	2	1	0	1 (Note: Appearance in Leinster Senior Cup)	0	18	7
Limerick	2016	LOI First Division	19	5	1	0	3	0	2	2	21	7
Limerick	2017	LOI First Division	7	2	2	2	1	0	1	0	11	4
Limerick	Total		26	7	3	2	4	0	3	2	32	11
Southern United	2017–18	Premiership	13	8	—		—		—		13	8
Southern United	2018–19	Premiership	18	13	—		—		—		18	13
Southern United	2019–20	Premiership	16	8	—		—		—		16	8
Southern United	Total		47	29	0	0	0	0	0	0	47	29
Dunedin Technical	2018	Premier League	—		—		—		6 (Note: Appearances and goals in Southern Football League)	2	6	2
Canterbury United	2020–21	Premiership	14	6	—		—		—		14	6
Cashmere Technical	2019	Premier League	14	13	3	5	3 (Note: Appearances and goals in English Cup)	6	4	6	24	30
Cashmere Technical	2020	Premier League	11	12	—		3	1	1 (Note: Appearances and goals in South Island Championship)	2	15	15
Cashmere Technical	2021	Premier League	10	12	7	13	2	3	—		30	38
Cashmere Technical	2021	National League	11	10	7	13	2	3	—		30	38
Cashmere Technical	2022	National League	22	33	3	3	3	6	—		28	42
Cashmere Technical	2023	National League	26	39	4	3	4	3	—		34	45
Cashmere Technical	2024	National League	18	34	0	0	3	2	—		21	36
Cashmere Technical	2025	National League	13	16	0	0	2	2	—		15	17
Cashmere Technical	2026	National League	17	32	5	3	1	0	—		23	35
Cashmere Technical	Total		142	201	22	27	21	21	5	8	190	258
Career total			311	257	32	32	30	25	17	12	372	367

== Honours ==
Limerick

- League of Ireland First Division: 2012, 2016

Cashmere Technical

- Mainland Premier League: 2019, 2020, 2021
- South Island Football Championship: 2020
- Southern League: 2021, 2024, 2026
- Chatham Cup: 2021
- English Cup: 2019, 2021, 2022

Individual

- Mainland Football Mens Golden Boot: 2019, 2022, 2024, 2025, 2026
- Mainland Football Mens Striker/Forward of the Year: 2021, 2022, 2026
- Mainland Football Mens Player of the Year: 2021, 2022, 2026
- Southern League top scorer: 2021, 2022, 2024, 2025, 2026
- Southern League MVP: 2023, 2026
- New Zealand National League top scorer: 2022, 2023, 2024
- New Zealand National League MVP: 2023
- New Zealand National League team of the season: 2022, 2023, 2024
- Steve Sumner Medal: 2022
