= Mohamed Awad (Somali footballer) =

Somali footballer (born 1994)

Mohamed Awad Maxamed Cawad
Personal information
- Full name: Mohamed Abdulahi Awad
- Date of birth: 7 May 1994 (age 32)
- Place of birth: Hamilton, New Zealand
- Height: 1.70 m (5 ft 7 in)
- Position: Winger

Team information
- Current team: Sliema Wanderers
- Number: 77

Youth career
- –2011: Melville United

College career
Years	Team	Apps	(Gls)
2014	St. John's Red Storm	17	(2)
2015–2017	SIU Edwardsville Cougars	51	(3)

Senior career*
Years	Team	Apps	(Gls)
2010–2012	Melville United		
2011–2013	Waikato	16	(3)
2013–2014	Western Suburbs	18	(9)
2015	Inglewood United		
2016	Stirling Macedonia	1	(2)
2018–2020	Eastern Suburbs	24	(3)
2019	Melbourne Knights	11	(4)
2020	Dandenong Thunder	0	(0)
2020	Port Melbourne	3	(0)
2020–2021	Auckland City	22	(8)
2022	Manukau United	12	(6)
2022–	Sliema Wanderers	94	(17)

International career^{‡}
2021–	Somalia	8	(2)
- * Club domestic league appearances and goals as of 18 May 2026 ‡ National team caps and goals as of 26 March 2024

Mohamed Abdulahi Awad (Somali: Maxamed Cabdullaahi Cawad; born 7 May 1994) is a Somali professional footballer who plays as a winger for Maltese Premier League club Sliema Wanderers. Born in New Zealand, he represents Somalia at international level.

== Club career ==
Awad began his senior career at New Zealand Football Championship club Waikato, after a spell in the youth system at Waikato. After failing to make any appearances for Waikato, Awad signed for Western Suburbs in 2013. In 2014, Awad moved to the United States, playing college soccer for St. John's Red Storm. Between 2015 and 2017, Awad played college soccer for SIU Edwardsville Cougars and domestic football for Australian club Inglewood United. In 2018, Awad moved back to New Zealand, signing for Eastern Suburbs. Awad made 22 league appearances, scoring three times, during his two seasons at the club, winning the 2018–19 New Zealand Football Championship. In 2020, Awad signed for Auckland City.

== International career ==
On 15 June 2021, Awad made his debut for Somalia, in a 1–0 friendly loss against Djibouti.

== Personal life ==
Born and raised in Hamilton, New Zealand, prior to receiving his call up for the Somalia national team, Awad had never been to the country.
