= Lucas Meek =

American soccer player (born 1999)

Personal information
- Date of birth: March 7, 1999 (age 27)
- Place of birth: Mercer Island, Washington, United States
- Height: 1.87 m (6 ft 2 in)
- Positions: Winger; forward

Team information
- Current team: Greenville Triumph
- Number: 33

Youth career
- Eastside FC
- –2017: Seattle Sounders FC

College career
| Years | Team | Apps | (Gls) |
| 2017–2022 | Washington Huskies | 68 | (26) |

Senior career*
| Years | Team | Apps | (Gls) |
| 2018 | OSA FC | | |
| 2022 | Ballard FC | 0 | (0) |
| 2022 | Everett Jets | | |
| 2023 | Inter Miami II | 22 | (4) |
| 2023 | Inter Miami | 0 | (0) |
| 2024 | Western Suburbs | 17 | (17) |
| 2025 | Manly United | 25 | (7) |
| 2025 | One Knoxville | 5 | (0) |
| 2026– | Greenville Triumph | 15 | (1) |
- * Club domestic league appearances and goals as of October 31, 2026

Lucas Meek (born March 7, 1999) is an American professional soccer player who plays as a forward for Greenville Triumph in the USL League One.

== Career ==
=== Youth, college and amateur ===
Meek attended Mercer Island High School, where mixed varsity soccer with club soccer at both Eastside FC and later the Seattle Sounders FC academy.

In 2017, Meek attended the University of Washington to play college soccer. He redshirted his freshman season due to injury and only made one appearance in 2018, but went on to make 48 appearances for the Huskies during his initial college career, scoring 16 goals and tallying 13 assists. In 2021, Meek was named to the 2021 All-Region Second Team, the 2021 All-Pac-12 Second Team, and the 2021 Scholar All-American Second Team.

While at college, Meek also appeared in the National Premier Soccer League with OSA FC.

On January 11, 2022, Meek was selected 37th overall in the 2022 MLS SuperDraft by Inter Miami CF. However, a week prior Meek suffered a torn meniscus that required surgery. Instead of playing professionally in 2022, Meek returned to Washington to play another season of college soccer. He had a standout season, scoring ten goals in 20 games and adding a further eight assists. He earned numerous accolades, including Pac-12 All-Conference First Team and United Soccer Coaches All-Far West Region First Team, as well as Pac-12 Scholar-Athlete of the Year.

Meek also spent time in 2022 organizing a 64-team, 5v5 charity soccer tournament for the ALS Association.

In 2022, Meek was named to the USL League Two side Ballard FC's roster but didn't make an appearance.

Meek later played for Everett Jets FC of the Evergreen Premier League in 2022, helping them to their first playoff appearance and scoring 1 goal.

=== Professional ===
On March 22, 2023, it was announced that Meek had signed his first professional contract with MLS Next Pro side Inter Miami CF II. On September 8, 2023, Meek signed a short-term deal to play with Miami's Major League Soccer side.

Following his release from Miami at the end of the 2023 season, Meek signed with New Zealand Central League side Western Suburbs. He scored four first-half goals on his debut against Island Bay United. For the 2025 season, Meek moved to National Premier Leagues NSW side Manly United.

On August 7, 2025, Meek returned to the United States and signed with USL League One side One Knoxville SC.
