= Seddon Fields =

Football stadium in Auckland, New Zealand

- Interactive map of Seddon Fields
- Type: Urban park
- Location: 180 Meola Road, Western Springs, Auckland
- Coordinates: 36°51′33.0″S 174°43′03.5″E
- Operator: Auckland Council
- Website: Auckland Council

Seddon Fields, is a reserve and sports ground in the suburb of Western Springs in Auckland, New Zealand. It is the home ground of New Zealand National League and Northern League side Western Springs. Seddon Fields also hosts the annual U17 National Football tournament. The ground also hosts Kilikiti and seven-a-side football over summer.

== History ==
Between December 2012 and July 2013, renovations took place on their football pitches to install two artificial turfs and floodlights. The official opening of the new turf pitches took place on 5 July 2013 by Waitematā Local Board Chair; Shale Chambers. Between March and August 2022, the turf was re-laid after flooding in previous years, with a shock-pad also being added underneath. The lights were also upgraded to 300 lux.

Also in September 2022, Seddon Fields were shortlisted by FIFA to be a team base camp for the 2023 FIFA Women's World Cup. Seddon Fields was announced on 12 December 2022, as the training ground for Norway during the world cup. As one of the base camps for the World Cup, one of the grass pitches was upgraded to FIFA standards.
