= Madills Farm Reserve =

Football stadium in New Zealand

Madills Farm Recreation Reserve
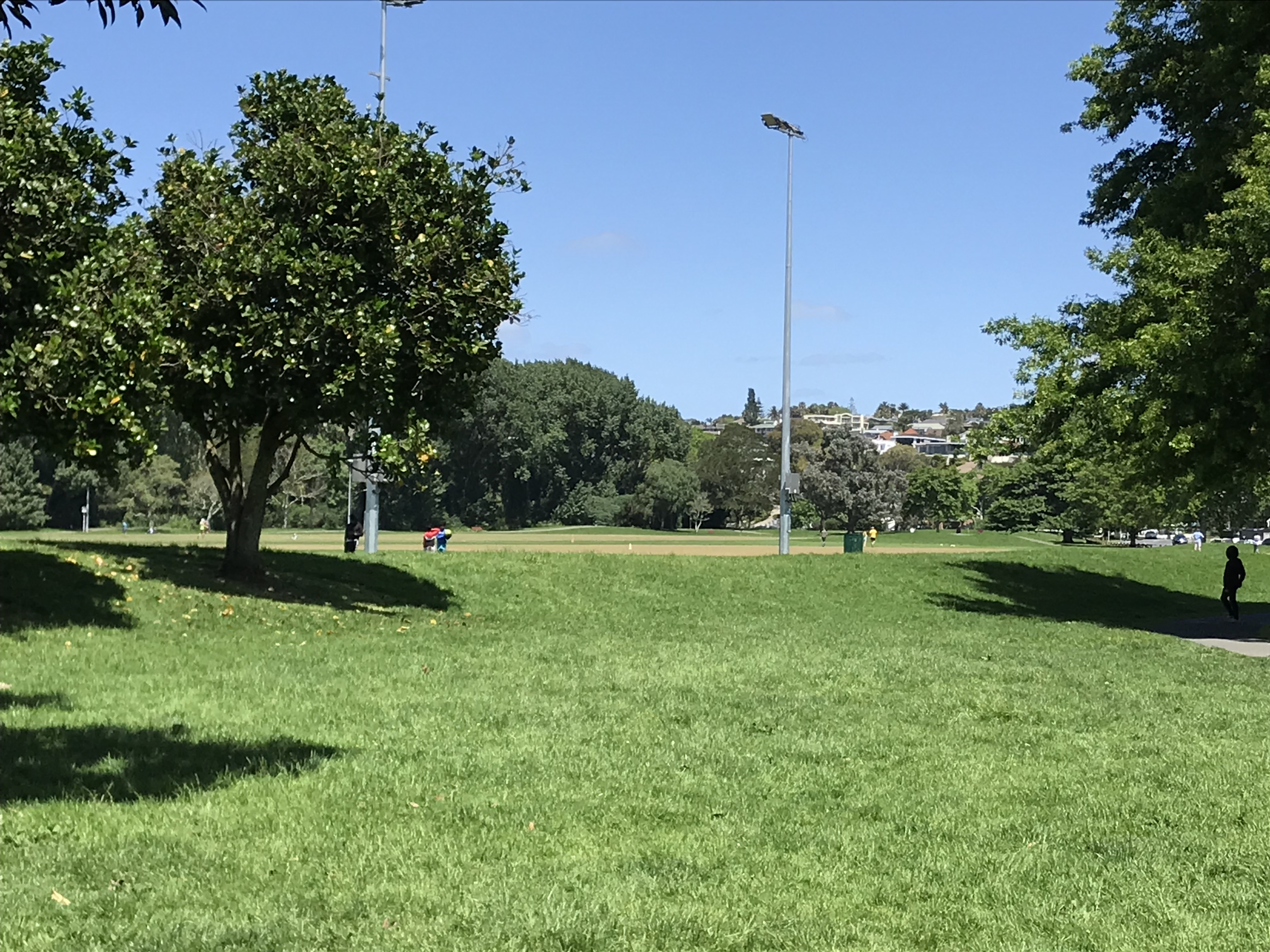
- Type: Urban park
- Location: 6 Baddeley Avenue, Kohimarama, Auckland
- Coordinates: 36°51′21.97″S 174°50′37.76″E
- Area: 26 acres (11 ha)
- Created: 1947
- Operated by: Auckland Council
- Website: Auckland Council

Madills Farm Reserve, also known as Madills Farm, is a reserve and sports ground in the suburb of Kohimarama in Auckland, New Zealand. It is the home ground of Eastern Suburbs and the Kohimarama Yacht club.

== History ==
Before European settlers arrived in New Zealand, the Madills Farm area was known by Māori as Waipara ra which meant duck water.

In 1919 a Mr William Madill, a local farmer, was granted a 21-year lease of a 119 acre block estate at £246 per annum, that would include what is now known as Madills Farm Reserve. Madill surrendered part of the land back to the Trust in 1920 as they had decided to subdivide the land near the beach however he farmed the remainder until 1944.

In 1943 the Melanesian Trust Board subdivided the land and planned to build houses and shops on it, but they also set aside 30 acres to be developed as reserve land by the local council for recreational purposes. The site was used as a land-fill until the Council finalised the purchase in 1959.

In 1975, Council considered developing playing fields for rugby, hockey and football, as well as building sports complex on the area. This was opposed by local residents so the sports complex was never built.

== Ground layout ==
The reserve is divided into two open spaces, one with informal recreation and the other with organised recreation, which has the playing fields.
