= Fraser Park =

Sportsground in Lower Hutt, New Zealand

Fraser Park Sportsville
- Fraser Park
- Interactive map of Fraser Park Sportsville
- Location: 237 Taita Drive, Avalon, Lower Hutt
- Coordinates: 41°11′4.8″S 174°56′56.55″E
- Owner: Hutt City Council
- Operator: Ricoh

Construction
- Opened: March, 2019
- Cost: $12,500,000

Tenants
- Avalon Rugby; Hutt City Squash; Hutt Valley Dodgers; Hutt Valley Softball Association; Lower Hutt City Football; Naenae Hockey Club; Taita District Cricket; Wellington Phoenix; Wellington Regional Hockey Stadium Trust

Website
- https://www.fpsportsville.org.nz

Fraser Park is Lower Hutt's largest recreational sportsground, at 27 hectares it is the biggest sporting ground in the lower North Island. It is home to the Ricoh Sports Centre, a multi-use venue, as well as sports like rugby, rugby league, football, touch football, cricket, kilikiti (Samoan cricket) and softball.

== History ==
Fraser Park Sportsville was launched in September 2009. The Fraser Park Sportsville founding clubs signed the Sportsville constitution in April 2010.

The first stage of construction in 2015 saw three new softball diamonds, an artificial football turf and floodlights added to the park. Stage two saw the construction of the building to hold the clubs as well as six squash courts, indoor training facilities, eight changing rooms, a cafe and two bars.

Ricoh were confirmed as name sponsor in May 2018 with Fraser Park Sportsville and the RICOH Sports Centre officially opened in March 2019 by Mayor Ray Wallace.

== Tenants ==
The original members of the Sportsville are Avalon Rugby, Hutt Valley Dodgers, Lower Hutt City Football, Naenae Hockey Club, Taita District Cricket and Hutt City Squash Club. They were later joined by the Hutt Valley Softball Association and Wellington Regional Hockey Stadium Trust.
