= Porritt Stadium =

Stadium in Chartwell, Hamilton, New Zealand

- Interactive map of Porritt Stadium
- Location: 78 Crosby Rd, Hamilton, New Zealand, New Zealand
- Coordinates: 37.756159°S 175.291127°E
- Owner: Hamilton City Council
- Operator: Hamilton City Council
- Capacity: 2,700
- Surface: Grass Pitch

Tenants
- Hamilton Wanderers AFC (–present); Waikato FC (2011–2013)

Porritt Stadium (or Porritt Park), is a multi-purpose stadium in the suburb of Chartwell in Hamilton, New Zealand. It is used for football matches and athletics and is the home stadium of Hamilton Wanderers. The main field is surrounded by a national grade athletics track.

The stadium is named for Arthur Porritt, Baron Porritt.

Porritt Stadium hosted the 2022 New Zealand Special Olympics National Summer Games. It was formerly used in the New Zealand Football Championship as Hamilton's and Waikato’s home ground.

== History ==
In 2015, Porritt Stadium was upgraded and small stands were installed due to it being a training ground for the 2015 FIFA U-20 World Cup.

In September 2023 FIFA announced that Gower Park would be a venue-specific training site for the 2023 FIFA Women's World Cup. $600,000 was spent on upgrading the pitch, lights and changing rooms that were built around the 1970's.
