= 2022–23 Wellington Phoenix FC season =

Wellington Phoenix
2022–23 season
- Chairman: Rob Morrison
- Manager: Ufuk Talay
- Stadium: Sky Stadium
- A-League Men: 6th
- A-League Men Finals: Elimination-finals
- Australia Cup: Quarter-finals
- Top goalscorer: League: Oskar Zawada (15); All: Oskar Zawada (15)
- Highest home attendance: 10,420 vs. Sydney FC (12 March 2023); A-League Men
- Lowest home attendance: 2,502 vs. Western Sydney Wanderers (10 December 2022); A-League Men
- Average home league attendance: 6,333
- Biggest win: 4–0 vs. Devonport City (A) (3 August 2022); Australia Cup
- Biggest defeat: 1–5 vs. Adelaide United (A) (17 March 2023); A-League Men
- All statistics correct as of 28 April 2023.

The 2022–23 season was the 16th in the history of Wellington Phoenix Football Club. In addition to the domestic league, the club also participated in the Australia Cup for the eighth time.

== Players ==
Note: Flags indicate national team as defined under FIFA eligibility rules; some limited exceptions apply. Players may hold more than one non-FIFA nationality.

No.	Pos.	Nation	Player
3	DF	NZL	Finn Surman
4	DF	ENG	Scott Wootton
5	MF	AUS	Steven Ugarkovic
6	DF	NZL	Tim Payne
7	FW	NZL	Kosta Barbarouses
8	MF	NZL	Ben Old
9	FW	POL	Oskar Zawada
10	FW	ENG	David Ball
11	MF	BUL	Bozhidar Kraev
12	DF	AUS	Lucas Mauragis (on loan from Newcastle Jets)
13	MF	AUS	Nicholas Pennington

No.	Pos.	Nation	Player
14	MF	NZL	Alex Rufer (captain)
15	DF	NZL	Nikko Boxall
17	DF	NZL	Callan Elliot
19	MF	NZL	Sam Sutton
20	GK	NZL	Oliver Sail (vice-captain)
21	DF	AUS	Joshua Laws
23	MF	NZL	Clayton Lewis
24	FW	NZL	Oskar van Hattum
31	MF	BRA	Yan Sasse
40	GK	NZL	Alex Paulsen

== Transfers ==
=== Transfers in ===
No.	Position	Player	Transferred from	Type/fee	Contract length	Date	Ref.
5	MF	(Australia) Steven Ugarkovic	Unattached	Free transfer	1 year	3 June 2022	
7	FW	Kosta Barbarouses	Unattached	Free transfer	2 years	21 June 2022	
12	DF	(Australia) Lucas Mauragis	Newcastle Jets	Loan	1 year	30 June 2022	
11	MF	(Bulgaria) Bozhidar Kraev	(Denmark) Midtjylland	Free transfer	2 years	22 July 2022	
31	MF	(Brazil) Yan Sasse	(Brazil) América Mineiro	Free transfer	1 year	13 August 2022	
9	FW	(Poland) Oskar Zawada	Unattached	Free transfer	2 years	30 August 2022	
15	DF	Nikko Boxall	(New Zealand) Auckland City	Free transfer	6 months	7 February 2023	

=== Transfers out ===
No.	Position	Player	Transferred to	Type/fee	Date	Ref.
88	FW	(England) Gary Hooper	Unattached	Mutual contract termination	25 March 2022	
16	DF	Louis Fenton	Retired		20 May 2022	
3	DF	(North Macedonia) Matthew Bozinovski	Melbourne Victory	End of loan	23 May 2022	
5	DF	James McGarry	Unattached	End of contract	23 May 2022	
7	MF	(Mexico) Gael Sandoval	(Mexico) Guadalajara	End of loan	23 May 2022	
11	FW	(Australia) Jaushua Sotirio	Unattached	End of contract	23 May 2022	
31	DF	(England) Kurtis Mogg	Unattached	End of contract	23 May 2022	
32	FW	George Ott	Unattached	End of contract	23 May 2022	
10	FW	(Australia) Reno Piscopo	Newcastle Jets	End of contract	24 May 2022	
18	FW	Ben Waine	(England) Plymouth Argyle	Undisclosed	30 December 2022	

=== Contract extensions ===
No.	Player	Position	Duration	Date	Notes	Ref.
10	(England) David Ball	Striker	2 years	26 May 2022	Contract extended from end of 2022–23 until end of 2024–25.	
14	Alex Rufer	Defensive midfielder	3 years	29 March 2023	Contract extended from end of 2022–23 until end of 2025–26.	

== Technical staff ==
Role	Name
Head coach	(Australia) Ufuk Talay
Assistant coach	(Australia) Giancarlo Italiano
Assistant coach	(England) Chris Greenacre
Goalkeeping coach	(New Zealand) Ruben Parker
Football operations and facilities coordinator	(New Zealand) Shaun Gill
Head of football conditioning	(New Zealand) Weijie Lim
Head physiotherapist	Ben Venn
Assistant physiotherapist	Cory Glover
Equipment manager	Jack Mapp
Team analyst	Logan Hughes

== Pre-season and friendlies ==
20 July 2022	Wellington Phoenix	2–0	(New Zealand) Miramar Rangers	Wellington
	Waine; Laws	Report

6 August 2022	Central Coast Mariners	2–0	Wellington Phoenix	Sydney, Australia
	Nkololo ?' (pen.); Hall 30'	Report		Stadium: Valentine Sports Park
Note: Match was played over three 30 minute periods

12 August 2022	Newcastle Jets	0–3	Wellington Phoenix	Sydney, Australia
		Report	Waine; Old; Payne

4 September 2022	Newcastle Jets	3–3	Wellington Phoenix	Sydney, Australia
	Piscopo ?'; Goodwin ?' (pen.); Hoffman ?'	CoY report Newcastle Herald report	van Hattum ?', ?'; Bidois ?'
Note: The match was played over three 45-minute periods

24 or 25 September 2022	Wellington Phoenix	5–2	(New Zealand) Napier City Rovers	Wellington
		Report

1 October 2022	Sydney FC	3–0	Wellington Phoenix	Sydney, Australia
	Caceres 69', 81'; Burgess 86'	Report

== Competitions ==
Win Draw Loss Cancelled or postponed

=== Overview ===
Competition	First match	Last match	Starting round	Final position	Record							
Competition	First match	Last match	Starting round	Final position	Pld	W	D	L	GF	GA	GD	Win %
A-League Men	9 October 2022	29 April 2023	Matchday 1	6th	26	9	8	9	39	45	−6	34.62
A-League Finals	5 May 2023	5 May 2023	Elimination-finals	Elimination-finals	1	0	0	1	0	2	−2	0.00
Australia Cup	3 August 2022	31 August 2022	Round of 32	Quarter-final	3	2	0	1	6	3	+3	66.67
Total					30	11	8	11	45	50	−5	36.67

Last updated: 5 May 2023
Source: Soccerway

=== A-League Men ===
==== League table ====
Pos	Team	Pld	W	D	L	GF	GA	GD	Pts	Qualification
4	Western Sydney Wanderers	26	11	8	7	43	27	+16	41	Qualification for Finals series (Note: The top two teams enter the finals series at the semi-finals, while the teams ranked third to sixth enter the finals series at the elimination-finals.)
5	Sydney FC	26	11	5	10	40	39	+1	38	Qualification for Finals series
6	Wellington Phoenix (Note: Wellington Phoenix cannot qualify for Asian Football Confederation competitions as they are based in New Zealand, which is under the Oceania Football Confederation.)	26	9	8	9	39	45	−6	35	Qualification for Finals series
7	Western United	26	9	5	12	34	47	−13	32	
8	Brisbane Roar	26	7	9	10	26	33	−7	30	

Source: A-Leagues
Rules for classification: 1) Points; 2) Goal difference; 3) Goals scored; 4) Points per game; 5) Least red cards; 6) Least yellow cards; 7) Toss of a coin in an event of a tie of two clubs.

==== Results summary ====
Overall								Home						Away					
Pld	W	D	L	GF	GA	GD	Pts	W	D	L	GF	GA	GD	W	D	L	GF	GA	GD
26	9	8	9	39	45	−6	35	5	5	3	24	20	+4	4	3	6	15	25	−10

Last updated: 29 April 2023.
Source: ultimatealeague.com

==== Results by round ====
Round	1	2	3	4	5	6	7	8	9	10	11	12	13	14	15	16	17	18	19	20	21	22	23	24	25	26
Ground	H	H	A	A	H	H	H	H	A	H	A	A	H	H	A	A	A	A	H	H	A	H	A	H	A	A
Result	D	D	L	D	W	L	D	W	D	L	W	W	W	D	L	L	W	D	W	W	L	L	L	D	L	W
Position	5	8	9	9	7	8	10	6	7	9	7	4	4	4	5	6	5	5	5	5	5	5	5	5	6	6
Points	1	2	2	3	6	6	7	10	11	11	14	17	20	21	21	21	24	25	28	31	31	31	31	32	32	35

Updated to match(es) played on 29 April 2023. Source: Ultimate A-League
A = Away; H = Home; W = Win; D = Draw; L = Loss
Notes: Positions show the situation at the end of the corresponding Rounds; not the position at the conclusion of matches or game days

==== Matches ====
9 October 2022 1	Wellington Phoenix	1–1	Adelaide United	Wellington
15:00 NZST	Waine 75'	Report	Halloran 90+3'	Stadium: Sky Stadium; Attendance: 8,325; Referee: Ben Abraham

16 October 2022 2	Wellington Phoenix	2–2	Central Coast Mariners	Wellington
15:00 NZST	Waine 57'; Ayongo 88' (o.g.)	Report	Silvera 59'; Cummings 64'	Stadium: Sky Stadium; Attendance: 7,089; Referee: Johnathan Barreiro

22 October 2022 3	Newcastle Jets	3–1	Wellington Phoenix	Newcastle
17:00 AEDT	McGarry 4'; Dartsmelia 16'; Buhagiar 44'	Report	Kraev 39'	Stadium: McDonald Jones Stadium; Attendance: 7,028; Referee: Jack Morgan

30 October 2022 4	Melbourne City	2–2	Wellington Phoenix	Melbourne
19:00 AEST	Maclaren 16' (pen.); Tilio 34'	Report	Sutton 79'; Barbarouses 90'	Stadium: AAMI Park; Attendance: 6,208; Referee: Adam Kersey

6 November 2022 5	Wellington Phoenix	4–1	Macarthur FC	Wellington
15:00 NZST	Old 45+3'; Lewis 65'; Waine 67'; Kraev 75'	Report	Rose 59'	Stadium: Sky Stadium; Attendance: 6,135; Referee: Casey Reibelt

13 November 2022 6	Wellington Phoenix	2–3	Western United	Wellington
15:00 NZST	Zawada 22'; Kraev 59'	Report	Tratt 64'; Prijović 84'; Diamanti 90+5'	Stadium: Sky Stadium; Attendance: 5,203; Referee: Tim Danaskos

Mid-season break for 2022 FIFA World Cup

10 December 2022 7	Wellington Phoenix	1–1	Western Sydney Wanderers	Wollongong
19:00 NZST	Kraev 61'	Report	N'Gbakoto 79'	Stadium: WIN Stadium; Attendance: 2,502; Referee: Lachlan Keevers

17 December 2022 8	Wellington Phoenix	3–1	Adelaide United	Wellington
15:00 NZST	Zawada 2'; Kraev 37'; Sasse 61'	Report	Goodwin 12'	Stadium: Sky Stadium; Attendance: 4,535; Referee: Jonathan Barreiro

23 December 2022 9	Perth Glory	1–1	Wellington Phoenix	Perth
19:45 AEDT	D. Williams 22'	Report	Zawada 31'	Stadium: Macedonia Park; Attendance: 3,977; Referee: Casey Reibelt

2 January 2023 10	Wellington Phoenix	1–3	Melbourne City	Wellington
13:00 AEDT	Ball 16'	Report	Leckie 18'; Maclaren 51' (pen.), 90+6'	Stadium: Sky Stadium; Attendance: 6,321; Referee: Alex King

7 January 2023 11	Sydney FC	0–1	Wellington Phoenix	Sydney
17:00 AEDT		Report	Zawada 10'	Stadium: Allianz Stadium; Attendance: 13,921; Referee: Shaun Evans

14 January 2023 12	Brisbane Roar	0–1	Wellington Phoenix	Brisbane
17:00 AEDT		Report	Zawada 65'	Stadium: Kayo Stadium; Attendance: 6,183; Referee: Adam Kersey

22 January 2023 13	Wellington Phoenix	2–1	Central Coast Mariners	Wellington
15:00 AEDT	Rufer 32'; Zawada 40'	Report	Nkololo 90+2'	Stadium: Sky Stadium; Attendance: 5,543; Referee: Casey Reibelt

28 January 2023 14	Wellington Phoenix	2–2	Perth Glory	Palmerston North
13:00 AEDT	Zawada 11'; Barbarouses 20'	Report	D. Williams 22', 80'	Stadium: Central Energy Trust Arena; Attendance: 4,518; Referee: Lachlan Keevers

3 February 2023 15	Melbourne Victory	3–1	Wellington Phoenix	Melbourne
19:45 AEDT	Fornaroli 32'; Brimmer 54'; Juric 90+1'	Report	Zawada 13'	Stadium: AAMI Park; Attendance: 5,400; Referee: Adam Kersey

12 February 2023 16	Macarthur FC	2–1	Wellington Phoenix	Sydney
17:00 AEDT	Davila 33'; Najjar 49'	Report	Kraev 4'	Stadium: Campbelltown Stadium; Attendance: 2,543; Referee: Alireza Faghani

17 February 2023 17	Western United	0–3	Wellington Phoenix	Launceston
19:45 AEDT		Report	Sasse 19'; Kraev 58'; Zawada 64' (pen.)	Stadium: UTAS Stadium; Attendance: 2,690; Referee: Daniel Elder

24 February 2023 18	Central Coast Mariners	1–1	Wellington Phoenix	Gosford
19:45 AEDT	McGarry 12'	Report	Zawada 90+4'	Stadium: Industree Group Stadium; Attendance: 5,462; Referee: Jack Morgan

4 March 2023 19	Wellington Phoenix	2–1	Newcastle Jets	Wellington
15:00 AEDT	Elliot 40'; Zawada 45+6' (pen.)	Report	Saito 51'	Stadium: Sky Stadium; Attendance: 6,388; Referee: Shaun Evans

12 March 2023 20	Wellington Phoenix	1–0	Sydney FC	Auckland
15:00 AEDT	Zawada 21'	Report		Stadium: Eden Park; Attendance: 10,420; Referee: Chris Beath

17 March 2023 21	Adelaide United	5–1	Wellington Phoenix	Adelaide
19:45 AEDT	Wootton 16' (o.g.); Jovanovic 23'; Barr 51'; Ibusuki 62'; Goodwin 71'	Report	Rufer 54' (pen.)	Stadium: Coopers Stadium; Attendance: 9,036; Referee: Alex King

1 April 2023 22	Wellington Phoenix	1–2	Melbourne Victory	Wellington
13:00 AEDT	Zawada 25'	Report	Fornaroli 58'; Da Silva 76'	Stadium: Sky Stadium; Attendance: 7,032; Referee: Alireza Faghani

10 April 2023 23	Melbourne City	4–1	Wellington Phoenix	Melbourne
16:00 AEST	Maclaren 34', 52'; Tilio 57', 83'	Report	Ugarkovic 49'	Stadium: AAMI Park; Attendance: 4,821; Referee: Adam Kersey

16 April 2023 24	Wellington Phoenix	2–2	Brisbane Roar	Auckland
13:00 AEST	Zawada 35' (pen.); Sasse 56'	Report	O'Shea 8' (pen.); Neville 82'	Stadium: Eden Park; Attendance: 8,320; Referee: Stephen Lucas

21 April 2023 25	Western Sydney Wanderers	4–0	Wellington Phoenix	Sydney
19:45 AEST	Borrello 9'; Nieuwenhof 31'; Simmons 65'; Yengi 87'	Report		Stadium: CommBank Stadium; Attendance: 10,766; Referee: Alex King

29 April 2023 26	Macarthur FC	0–1	Wellington Phoenix	Sydney
17:00 AEST		Report	Zawada 11'	Stadium: Campbelltown Stadium; Attendance: 2,017; Referee: Adam Kersey

==== Finals series ====
5 May 2023 Elimination-final	Adelaide United	2–0	Wellington Phoenix	Adelaide
19:45 ACDT	Goodwin 19', 67' (pen.)	Report		Stadium: Coopers Stadium; Attendance: 10,231; Referee: Alireza Faghani

=== Australia Cup ===
3 August 2022 Round of 32	Devonport City	0–4	Wellington Phoenix	Devonport
19:30 (AEST)		Report	Waine 9', 64'; van Hattum 61'; Kraev 76'	Stadium: Valley Road Ground; Attendance: 1,550; Referee: Lachlan Keevers

17 August 2022 Round of 16	Melbourne City	1–2	Wellington Phoenix	Melbourne
19:30 (AEST)	Leckie 84'	Report	Barbarouses 19'; Waine 36'	Stadium: Casey Fields; Attendance: 2,067; Referee: Kurt Ams

31 August 2022 Quarter-finals	Macarthur FC	2–0	Wellington Phoenix	Sydney
19:30 (AEST)	Toure 41'; Rose 88'	Report		Stadium: Campbelltown Stadium; Attendance: 1,521; Referee: Daniel Elder

== Statistics ==
=== Appearances and goals ===
As of 5 May 2023

No.	Pos	Nat	Player	Total		A-League Men		A-League Finals		Australia Cup	
No.	Pos	Nat	Player	Apps	Goals	Apps	Goals	Apps	Goals	Apps	Goals
Goalkeepers:
20	GK	(New Zealand) NZL	Oliver Sail	30	0	26	0	1	0	3	0
40	GK	(New Zealand) NZL	Alex Paulsen	0	0	0	0	0	0	0	0
Defenders:
3	DF	(New Zealand) NZL	Finn Surman	4	0	1+3	0	0	0	0	0
4	DF	(England) ENG	Scott Wootton	24	0	19+1	0	1	0	3	0
6	DF	(New Zealand) NZL	Tim Payne	26	0	22+1	0	1	0	1+1	0
12	DF	(Australia) AUS	Lucas Mauragis	20	0	17+2	0	1	0	0	0
15	DF	(New Zealand) NZL	Nikko Boxall	3	0	1+2	0	0	0	0	0
17	DF	(New Zealand) NZL	Callan Elliot	28	1	20+4	1	1	0	3	0
19	DF	(New Zealand) NZL	Sam Sutton	18	1	9+6	1	0	0	3	0
21	DF	(Australia) AUS	Joshua Laws	24	0	15+6	0	0	0	3	0
39	DF	(New Zealand) NZL	Marco Lorenz	1	0	0	0	0	0	0+1	0
Midfielders:
5	MF	(Australia) AUS	Steven Ugarkovic	27	1	22+4	1	1	0	0	0
8	MF	(New Zealand) NZL	Ben Old	19	1	3+14	1	0	0	2	0
11	MF	(Bulgaria) BUL	Bozhidar Kraev	29	8	22+3	7	0+1	0	2+1	1
13	MF	(Australia) AUS	Nicholas Pennington	17	0	2+12	0	0	0	3	0
14	MF	(New Zealand) NZL	Alex Rufer	19	2	14+4	2	1	0	0	0
23	MF	(New Zealand) NZL	Clayton Lewis	23	1	14+5	1	0+1	0	3	0
31	MF	(Brazil) BRA	Yan Sasse	25	3	18+4	3	1	0	0+2	0
34	MF	(New Zealand) NZL	Jackson Manuel	1	0	0	0	0	0	0+1	0
Forwards:
7	FW	(New Zealand) NZL	Kosta Barbarouses	27	3	14+9	2	1	0	3	1
9	FW	(Poland) POL	Oskar Zawada	26	15	24+1	15	1	0	0	0
10	FW	(England) ENG	David Ball	24	1	20+3	1	1	0	0	0
24	FW	(New Zealand) NZL	Oskar van Hattum	15	1	0+11	0	0+1	0	1+2	1
35	FW	(New Zealand) NZL	Noah Karunaratne	1	0	0	0	0	0	0+1	0
Players who left during the season but made an appearance
18	FW	(New Zealand) NZL	Ben Waine	11	6	3+5	3	0	0	3	3
36	FW	(New Zealand) NZL	Riley Bidois	1	0	0	0	0	0	0+1	0

- Source: Wellington Phoenix

=== Disciplinary record ===
Includes all competitions. The list is sorted by squad number when total cards are equal. Players with no cards not included in the list.

As of 5 May 2023

Rank	No.	Pos.	Nat.	Name	A-League Men			A-League Finals			Australia Cup			Total		
Rank	No.	Pos.	Nat.	Name	Yellow card	Second yellow card	Red card	Yellow card	Second yellow card	Red card	Booked	Second yellow card	Sent off (straight red)	Yellow card	Second yellow card	Red card
1	17	DF	(New Zealand)	Callan Elliot	7	0	0	0	0	0	0	0	0	7	0	0
2	11	MF	(Bulgaria)	Bozhidar Kraev	4	1	0	1	0	0	0	0	0	5	1	0
3	10	FW	(England)	David Ball	6	0	0	0	0	0	0	0	0	6	0	0
4	6	DF	(New Zealand)	Tim Payne	3	0	1	0	0	0	1	0	0	4	0	1
4	13	MF	(Australia)	Nicholas Pennington	2	0	1	0	0	0	2	0	0	4	0	1
4	31	FW	(Brazil)	Yan Sasse	2	0	1	1	0	0	0	0	0	3	0	1
7	4	DF	(England)	Scott Wootton	4	0	0	0	0	0	1	0	0	5	0	0
8	9	FW	(Poland)	Oskar Zawada	4	0	0	0	0	0	0	0	0	4	0	0
8	14	MF	(New Zealand)	Alex Rufer	4	0	0	0	0	0	0	0	0	4	0	0
10	21	DF	(Australia)	Joshua Laws	1	0	1	0	0	0	1	0	0	2	0	1
11	5	DF	(Australia)	Steven Ugarkovic	3	0	0	0	0	0	0	0	0	3	0	0
12	12	DF	(Australia)	Lucas Mauragis	2	0	0	0	0	0	0	0	0	2	0	0
12	20	GK	(New Zealand)	Oliver Sail	2	0	0	0	0	0	0	0	0	2	0	0
12	23	MF	(New Zealand)	Clayton Lewis	2	0	0	0	0	0	0	0	0	2	0	0
12	24	FW	(New Zealand)	Oskar van Hattum	2	0	0	0	0	0	0	0	0	2	0	0
16	3	DF	(New Zealand)	Finn Surman	1	0	0	0	0	0	0	0	0	1	0	0
16	8	MF	(New Zealand)	Ben Old	1	0	0	0	0	0	0	0	0	1	0	0
16	19	MF	(New Zealand)	Sam Sutton	1	0	0	0	0	0	0	0	0	1	0	0
Player(s) transferred out but featured this season
1	18	FW	(New Zealand)	Ben Waine	0	0	0	0	0	0	1	0	0	1	0	0

=== Clean sheets ===
As of 5 May 2023

Includes all competitive matches. The list is sorted by squad number when total clean sheets are equal.

Rank	No.	Player	A-League Men	A-League Finals	Australia Cup	Total
1	20	(New Zealand) Oli Sail	5	0	1	6

== Awards ==
=== Players ===
No.	Pos.	Player	Award	Source
9	FW	(Poland) Oskar Zawada	A-League Men Player of the Month (January)	
9	FW	(Poland) Oskar Zawada	Wellington Phoenix Player of the Year	
9	FW	(Poland) Oskar Zawada	Wellington Phoenix Players' Player of the Year	
9	FW	(Poland) Oskar Zawada	Wellington Phoenix Members' Player of the Year	
9	FW	(Poland) Oskar Zawada	Wellington Phoenix Media Player of the Year	
9	FW	(Poland) Oskar Zawada	A-League Men Fan Player of the Year	
17	DF	(New Zealand) Callan Elliot	Wellington Phoenix Under-23 Player of the Year	
23	MF	(New Zealand) Clayton Lewis	Wellington Phoenix Goal of the Year	
35	FW	(New Zealand) Noah Karunaratne	Wellington Phoenix Academy Player of the Year	

=== Manager ===
Manager	Award	Source
(Australia) Ufuk Talay	A-League Coach of the Month (January)	

== See also ==
- 2022–23 Wellington Phoenix FC (A-League Women) season
- 2022–23 A-League Men
