= 2021–22 Wellington Phoenix FC season =

Wellington Phoenix
2021–22 season
- Chairman: Rob Morrison
- Manager: Ufuk Talay
- Stadium: WIN Stadium; Leichhardt Oval (Due to Coronavirus travel restrictions); Sky Stadium; Eden Park
- A-League Men: 6th
- A-League Men Finals Series: Elimination-finals
- FFA Cup: Semi-finals
- Top goalscorer: League: Gael Sandoval; Jaushua Sotirio; Ben Waine (6); All: Jaushua Sotirio; Ben Waine (8)
- Highest home attendance: 18,184 (vs. Central Coast Mariners, 17 April 2022, A-League)
- Lowest home attendance: 38 (vs. Brisbane Roar, 16 February 2022, A-League) (Note: Excluding the Round 12 match on 9 February 2022 at home against Melbourne Victory as the match was played behind closed doors.)
- Average home league attendance: 4,105
- Biggest win: 4–1 (vs. Avondale FC (A), 14 December 2021, FFA Cup) (vs. Western United (A), 9 April 2022, A-League); 3–0 (vs. Brisbane Roar (H), 16 February 2022, A-League) (vs. Brisbane Roar (A), 30 March 2022, A-League)
- Biggest defeat: 0–6 (vs. Melbourne City (H), 2 April 2022, A-League)
Home colours	Away colours
- All statistics correct as of end of season.

The 2021–22 season was the Wellington Phoenix's 15th season since its establishment in 2007. The club participated in the A-League for the 15th time and in the FFA Cup for the 7th time.

This season was the Phoenix's third season fully or partially based in Australia, starting towards the end of the 2019–20 season. This season was Ufuk Talay's third in charge; in May 2021 he renewed his contract until 2023.

== Pre-season ==
The Phoenix finished 7th in the 2020–21 A-League season, one point short of finals series. On 21 May, the Phoenix announced that head coach Ufuk Talay had signed a 2-year contract extension with the club.

=== June ===
On 9 June, the Phoenix confirmed the departure of captain Ulises Dávila in spite of the club's record-setting efforts to retain him. He would later sign for Macarthur FC. On 10 June, the departure of Stefan Marinovic was confirmed by the Phoenix after he had signed with Israeli club Hapoel Nof HaGalil. On 15 June, the Phoenix announced the return of Gary Hooper on a two-year deal. On 23 June, the Phoenix re-signed Joshua Laws on a two-year contract. Following the conclusion of the 2020-21 A-League season, on 25 June, the Phoenix confirmed the departure of Cameron Devlin, Liam McGing, Luke DeVere, Te Atawhai Hudson-Wihongi, Matthew Ridenton, Charles Lokolingoy, and Mirza Muratovic. On 30 June, it was announced that left-back James McGarry signed a one-year contract extension.

=== July ===
On 10 July, it was announced that Tomer Hemed would not be re-signing with the club for the 2021-22 A-League season. Hemed had finished as the Phoenix's top goal-scorer with 11 goals. He would later sign for Western Sydney Wanderers. On 29 July, it was announced that defender Callan Elliot, who had previously played for the club, had returned on a two-year deal. On 30 July, the Phoenix announced the signing of Australian midfielder Nicholas Pennington on a two-year deal.

=== September ===
On 13 September, the Phoenix announced that academy players Ben Old and Alex Paulsen had signed three-year professional contracts with the club. On 27 September, Steven Taylor announced his shock retirement just days after being named captain.

=== October ===
On 13 October, the Phoenix bolstered their defensive stocks by securing a season-long loan deal for 20-year-old Melbourne Victory centre-back Matthew Bozinovski. On 18 October, the Phoenix announced the signing of Olyroo Luka Prso on a one-year deal. On 22 October, the Phoenix signed reserve team players George Ott and Kurtis Mogg on one-year scholarship contracts ahead of the A-League Men season.

=== November ===
In November the Phoenix played their last three preseason matches. They won against the Central Coast Mariners and Western Sydney Wanderers 1–0 and 2–1, respectively. The Phoenix would lose their last preseason match against Sydney by a 1–0 margin.

== Players ==
Note: Flags indicate national team as defined under FIFA eligibility rules; some limited exceptions apply. Players may hold more than one non-FIFA nationality.

No.	Pos.	Nation	Player
3	DF	MKD	Matthew Bozinovski (on loan from Melbourne Victory)
4	DF	ENG	Scott Wootton
5	DF	NZL	James McGarry
6	DF	NZL	Tim Payne
7	MF	MEX	Gael Sandoval (on loan from Guadalajara)
8	MF	NZL	Ben Old
9	FW	ENG	David Ball
10	FW	AUS	Reno Piscopo
11	MF	AUS	Jaushua Sotirio
13	MF	AUS	Nicholas Pennington
14	MF	NZL	Alex Rufer (captain)
16	DF	NZL	Louis Fenton

No.	Pos.	Nation	Player
17	DF	NZL	Callan Elliot
18	FW	NZL	Ben Waine
19	MF	NZL	Sam Sutton
20	GK	NZL	Oliver Sail (vice-captain)
21	DF	AUS	Joshua Laws
23	MF	NZL	Clayton Lewis
31	DF	ENG	Kurtis Mogg (scholarship)
32	FW	NZL	George Ott (scholarship)
33	DF	NZL	Finn Surman (scholarship)
40	GK	NZL	Alex Paulsen
43	FW	NZL	Oskar van Hattum (scholarship)
88	FW	ENG	Gary Hooper

Other players with first-team appearances

Note: Flags indicate national team as defined under FIFA eligibility rules; some limited exceptions apply. Players may hold more than one non-FIFA nationality.

No.	Pos.	Nation	Player
30	GK	NZL	Henry Gray
34	MF	NZL	Jackson Manuel

No.	Pos.	Nation	Player
36	FW	NZL	Riley Bidois
38	MF	NZL	Luis Toomey

== Transfers ==
=== From youth squad ===
N	Pos.	Nat.	Name	Age	Notes
8	MF	(New Zealand)	Ben Old	19	3-year senior contract
40	GK	(New Zealand)	Alex Paulsen	19	3-year senior contract
31	DF	(England)	Kurtis Mogg	20	1-year scholarship contract
32	FW	(New Zealand)	George Ott	20	1-year scholarship contract
33	DF	(New Zealand)	Finn Surman	18	4 month scholarship contract to be upgraded to a 3-year senior contract
43	FW	(New Zealand)	Oskar van Hattum	19	4 month scholarship contract to be upgraded to a 3-year senior contract
36	FW	(New Zealand)	Riley Bidois	20	Short-term signing
38	MF	(New Zealand)	Luis Toomey	20	Short-term signing

=== Transfers in ===
No.	Position	Player	Transferred from	Type/fee	Contract length	Date	Ref
88	FW	(England) Gary Hooper	Unattached	Free transfer	2 years	15 June 2021	
17	DF	Callan Elliot	(Greece) Xanthi	Free transfer	2 years	29 July 2021	
13	MF	(Australia) Nicholas Pennington	(Italy) Olbia	Free transfer	2 years	30 July 2021	
3	DF	(North Macedonia) Matthew Bozinovski	Melbourne Victory	Loan	1 year	13 October 2021	
12	MF	(Australia) Luka Prso	(Croatia) Osijek	Free transfer	1 year	18 October 2021	
7	MF	(Mexico) Gael Sandoval	(Mexico) Guadalajara	Loan	1 year	21 December 2021	
4	DF	(England) Scott Wootton	(England) Morecambe	Free transfer	5 months	7 January 2022	

=== Transfers out ===
No.	Position	Player	Transferred to	Type/fee	Date	Ref
10	MF	(Mexico) Ulises Dávila	Macarthur FC	End of contract	20 May 2021	
1	GK	Stefan Marinovic	(Israel) Hapoel Nof HaGalil	End of contract	31 May 2021	
2	DF	(Australia) Liam McGing	Unattached	End of contract	25 June 2021	
3	DF	(Australia) Luke DeVere	Unattached	End of contract	25 June 2021	
4	DF	Te Atawhai Hudson-Wihongi	Unattached	Mutual contract termination	25 June 2021	
8	MF	(Australia) Cameron Devlin	Unattached	End of contract	25 June 2021	
12	MF	Matthew Ridenton	Unattached	End of contract	25 June 2021	
13	FW	(Australia) Charles Lokolingoy	Unattached	End of contract	25 June 2021	
15	MF	(Australia) Mirza Muratovic	Unattached	End of contract	25 June 2021	
17	FW	(Israel) Tomer Hemed	Western Sydney Wanderers	End of contract	11 July 2021	
27	DF	(England) Steven Taylor	Retired		27 September 2021	
12	MF	(Australia) Luka Prso	Unattached	Mutual contract termination	10 January 2022	

=== Contract extensions ===
No.	Name	Position	Duration	Date	Ref.
21	(Australia) Joshua Laws	Centre-back	2 years	23 June 2021	
5	James McGarry	Left-back	1 year	30 June 2021	
6	Tim Payne	Defender	3 years	22 February 2022	
19	Sam Sutton	Midfielder / left-back	2 years	21 March 2022	
4	(England) Scott Wootton	Centre-back	3 years	24 March 2022	

== Technical staff ==
Position	Name
Head coach	(Australia) Ufuk Talay
Assistant coach	(England) Chris Greenacre
Assistant coach/Head analyst	(Australia) Giancarlo Italiano
Goalkeeping coach	(England) Paul Gothard
Head physiotherapist	(Scotland) Ben Venn
Strength & conditioning coach	(New Zealand) Aidan Wivell

== Friendlies ==
25 September 2021	Wellington Phoenix	2–0	(New Zealand) Miramar Rangers	Wellington, New Zealand
	Sotirio; Waine	Report

2 October 2021	Wellington Phoenix	1–1	(New Zealand) Wellington Olympic	Wellington, New Zealand
	Mogg	Report	Mata

9 October 2021	Wellington Phoenix	1–0	(New Zealand) Western Suburbs	Wellington, New Zealand
NZST	Ball	Report

16 October 2021	Wellington Phoenix	2–0	(New Zealand) Miramar Rangers	Wellington, New Zealand
	McGarry; Waine	Report

23 October 2021	Wellington Phoenix	3–0	(New Zealand) Western Suburbs	Wellington, New Zealand
NZST	Sotirio; McGarry; Old	Report		Stadium: Martin Luckie Park

2 November 2021	Central Coast Mariners	0–1	Wellington Phoenix	Sydney, Australia
11:00 AEDT		Report	Waine 38'	Stadium: Valentine Sports Park

6 November 2021	Western Sydney Wanderers	1–2	Wellington Phoenix	Sydney, Australia
18:00 AEDT	Najjarine 32'	Report	Ball 5'; Elliot 71'	Attendance: 0 (behind closed doors)

13 November 2021	Sydney FC	1–0	Wellington Phoenix	Sydney, Australia
17:00 AEDT	Le Fondre 23'	Report		Attendance: 0 (behind closed doors)

== Competitions ==
Win Draw Loss Cancelled or postponed

=== Overview ===
Competition	First match	Last match	Starting round	Final position	Record							
Competition	First match	Last match	Starting round	Final position	Pld	W	D	L	GF	GA	GD	Win %
A-League	21 November 2021	9 May 2022	Matchday 1	6th	26	12	3	11	34	49	−15	46.15
A-League Finals	14 May 2022		Elimination final	Elimination final	1	0	0	1	0	1	−1	0.00
FFA Cup	7 December 2021	29 January 2022	Round of 32	Semi-final	4	2	1	1	6	5	+1	50.00
Total					31	14	4	13	40	55	−15	45.16

Last updated: end of season.
Source: Competitions

=== A-League ===
==== League table ====
Pos	Team	Pld	W	D	L	GF	GA	GD	Pts	Qualification
4	Adelaide United	26	12	7	7	38	31	+7	43	Qualification for finals series (Note: The top two teams enter the finals series at the semi-finals, while the teams ranked third to sixth enter the finals series at the elimination-finals.)
5	Central Coast Mariners	26	12	6	8	49	35	+14	42	Qualification for finals series
6	Wellington Phoenix (Note: Wellington Phoenix cannot qualify for Asian Football Confederation competitions as they are based in New Zealand, which is under the Oceania Football Confederation.)	26	12	3	11	34	49	−15	39	Qualification for finals series
7	Macarthur FC	26	9	6	11	38	47	−9	33	
8	Sydney FC	26	8	7	11	37	44	−7	31	

Source: A-Leagues
Rules for classification: 1) Points; 2) Goal difference; 3) Goals scored; 4) Points per game; 5) Least red cards; 6) Least yellow cards; 7) Toss of a coin in an event of a tie of two clubs.

==== Results summary ====
Overall								Home						Away					
Pld	W	D	L	GF	GA	GD	Pts	W	D	L	GF	GA	GD	W	D	L	GF	GA	GD
26	12	3	11	34	49	−15	39	8	2	3	19	20	−1	4	1	8	15	29	−14

Last updated: end of season.
Source: ultimatealeague.com

==== Results by matchday ====
Game Week	1	2	3	4	5	6	7	8	9	10	11	12	13	14	15	16	17	18	19	20	21	22	23	24	25	26
Ground	A	H	H	A	A	A	A	H	H	A	A	H	H	H	H	A	H	A	A	H	A	H	H	H	A	A
Result	D	W	L	L	L	L	L	W	W	W	W	W	W	D	D	W		L	L	W	L	W	W	L	W	L
Position	7	3	7	9	10	11	12	12	12	12	9	10	7	5	–	–	–	–	–	–	–	–	–	–	–	6

Updated to match(es) played on 9 May 2022. Source: A-League Men
A = Away; H = Home; W = Win; D = Draw; L = Loss
Notes: Positions show the situation at the end of the corresponding Game Weeks (GW); not the position at the conclusion of matches or game days

==== Matches ====
21 November 2021 1	Macarthur FC	1–1	Wellington Phoenix	Newcastle
18:45 AEDT	La. Rose 61'	Report	Hooper 25' (pen.)	Stadium: McDonald Jones Stadium; Attendance: 1,188; Referee: Ben Abraham

27 November 2021 2	Wellington Phoenix	2–1	Central Coast Mariners	Wollongong
17:05 AEDT	Hooper 48'; Sotiro 63'	Report	Ureña 52'	Stadium: WIN Stadium; Attendance: 1,512; Referee: Jack Morgan

3 December 2021 3	Wellington Phoenix	0–2	Western Sydney Wanderers	Wollongong
19:45 AEDT		Report	Hemed 66'; Koutroumbis 90+3'	Stadium: WIN Stadium; Attendance: 1,948; Referee: Tim Danaskos

10 December 2021 4	Newcastle Jets	4–0	Wellington Phoenix	Newcastle
19:45 AEDT	Mikeltadze 32', 52'; Murnane 69'; Penha 80'	Report		Stadium: McDonald Jones Stadium; Attendance: 6,332; Referee: Lachlan Keevers

19 December 2021 5	Sydney FC	2–1	Wellington Phoenix	Sydney
18:45 AEDT	Kamsoba 19'; Le Fondre 57'	Report	Waine 83'	Stadium: Netstrata Jubilee Stadium; Attendance: 5,150; Referee: Ben Abraham

1 January 2022 7	Adelaide United	4–0	Wellington Phoenix	Adelaide
19:45 ACDT	Blackwood 7'; Goodwin 54' (pen.), 69' (pen.); Lopez 80'	Report		Stadium: Coopers Stadium; Attendance: 4,390; Referee: Daniel Elder

21 January 2022 11	Wellington Phoenix	2–1	Western United	Wollongong
19:45 AEST	Sandoval 16'; Hooper 35'	Report	Lustica 90+4'	Stadium: WIN Stadium; Attendance: 586; Referee: Shaun Evans

6 February 2022 13	Wellington Phoenix	3–1	Macarthur FC	Sydney
16:05 AEDT	Piscopo 12' (pen.); Sotirio 71', 78'	Report	Dávila 58'	Stadium: Campbelltown Stadium; Attendance: 2,328; Referee: Alex King

9 February 2022 12	Wellington Phoenix	1–0	Melbourne Victory	Wollongong
17:05 AEDT	Piscopo 74'	Report		Stadium: WIN Stadium; Attendance: 0 (behind closed doors); Referee: Ben Abraham

12 February 2022 14	Wellington Phoenix	1–1	Adelaide United	Sydney
16:50 AEDT	Sandoval 20'	Report	Oliveira 90+2'	Stadium: Netstrata Jubilee Stadium; Attendance: 797; Referee: Stephen Lucas

16 February 2022 8	Wellington Phoenix	3–0	Brisbane Roar	Sydney
17:25 AEDT	Wootton 33'; Sandoval 63'; Piscopo 67'	Report		Stadium: Leichhardt Oval; Attendance: 38; Referee: Alex King

19 February 2022 15	Wellington Phoenix	1–1	Sydney FC	Sydney
17:00 AEDT	Ball 43'	Report	Bobô 67'	Stadium: Leichhardt Oval; Attendance: 3,775; Referee: Jack Morgan

9 March 2022 9	Wellington Phoenix	3–2	Newcastle Jets	Gosford
19:45 AEDT	Sotirio 25' (pen.); Waine 45+1'; Ball 88'	Report	Penha 42'; Boumal 63'	Stadium: Central Coast Stadium; Attendance: 573; Referee: Ben Abraham

12 March 2022 18	Brisbane Roar	2–1	Wellington Phoenix	Brisbane
17:05 AEST	Akbari 7'; Hore 76'	Report	Hooper 72'	Stadium: Dolphin Oval; Attendance: 5,883; Referee: Tim Danaskos

18 March 2022 19	Newcastle Jets	4–0	Wellington Phoenix	Newcastle
19:45 AEDT	Boumal 51', 63'; Mikeltadze 67'; Babalj 83'	Report		Stadium: McDonald Jones Stadium; Attendance: 4,353; Referee: Alireza Faghani

26 March 2022 20	Wellington Phoenix	2–1	Perth Glory	Sydney
17:05 AEDT	Waine 37'; Pennington 90+7'	Report	Fitzgerald 49'	Stadium: Leichhardt Oval; Attendance: 168; Referee: Kurt Ams

30 March 2022 22	Brisbane Roar	0–3	Wellington Phoenix	Brisbane
18:05 AEST		Report	Neville 28' (o.g.); Waine 48'; Old 57'	Stadium: Moreton Daily Stadium; Attendance: 1,600; Referee: Shaun Evans

2 April 2022 21	Wellington Phoenix	0–6	Melbourne City	Sydney
16:35 AEDT		Report	Surman 17' (o.g.); Leckie 50'; Nabbout 59'; Good 68'; Tilio 76', 81'	Stadium: PointsBet Stadium; Attendance: 0 (No spectators permitted); Referee: Adam Kersey

5 April 2022 6	Central Coast Mariners	5–0	Wellington Phoenix	Gosford
19:05 AEST	Ureña 8' (pen.); Nkololo 24'; Cummings 55' (pen.); Kuol 68'; Hatch 90+3'	Report		Stadium: Central Coast Stadium; Attendance: 2,847; Referee: Daniel Elder

9 April 2022 23	Western United	1–4	Wellington Phoenix	Ballarat
14:05 AEST	Lustica 54'	Report	Wootton 29'; Sotirio 32', 63'; Sandoval 47' (pen.)	Stadium: Morshead Park Stadium; Attendance: 1,423; Referee: Daniel Elder

13 April 2022 10	Perth Glory	0–1	Wellington Phoenix	Sydney
19:05 AEST		Report	Sandoval 48'	Stadium: Netstrata Jubilee Stadium; Attendance: 89; Referee: Lachlan Keevers

17 April 2022 24	Wellington Phoenix	0–4	Central Coast Mariners	Wellington
15:05 NZST		Report	Nkololo 25'; Cummings 62'; Moresche 65'; Hatch 90+6'	Stadium: Sky Stadium; Attendance: 18,184; Referee: Adam Kersey

24 April 2022 25	Wellington Phoenix	1–0	Western Sydney Wanderers	Auckland
15:05 NZST	Waine 22'	Report		Stadium: Eden Park; Attendance: 15,245; Referee: Jonathan Barreiro

29 April 2022 26	Melbourne Victory	3–1	Wellington Phoenix	Melbourne
19:45 AEST	D'Agostino 2'; Brimmer 68' (pen.); Rojas 78'	Report	Sandoval 26' (pen.)	Stadium: AAMI Park; Attendance: 8,287; Referee: Shaun Evans

5 May 2022 16	Western Sydney Wanderers	1–2	Wellington Phoenix	Sydney
19:05 AEST	Hemed 29'	Report	Sutton 3' Piscopo 65'	Stadium: CommBank Stadium; Attendance: 4,769; Referee: Stephen Lucas

9 May 2022 17	Melbourne City	2–1	Wellington Phoenix	Melbourne
19:05 AEST	Sutton 3' (o.g.); Maclaren 10'	Source	Waine 54'	Stadium: AAMI Park; Attendance: 7,350; Referee: Daniel Elder

==== Finals series ====
14 May 2022 Elimination final	Western United	1–0	Wellington Phoenix	Melbourne
19:45 AEST	Prijović 10'	Report		Stadium: AAMI Park; Attendance: 3,376; Referee: Alex King

=== FFA Cup ===
7 December 2021 Round of 32	Western United	0–1	Wellington Phoenix	Geelong
19:30 AEDT		Report	Waine 35'	Stadium: GMHBA Stadium; Attendance: 1,217; Referee: Jack Morgan

14 December 2021 Round of 16	Avondale FC	1–4	Wellington Phoenix	Melbourne
19:30 AEDT	Reid 74'	Report	Sotirio 4', 14'; Waine 24'; Prso 81'	Stadium: ABD Stadium; Attendance: 830

5 January 2022 Quarter-finals	Melbourne City	0–0 (a.e.t.) (3–4 p)	Wellington Phoenix	Melbourne
19:30 AEDT		Report		Stadium: Kingston Heath Soccer Complex; Attendance: 1,485; Referee: Ben Abraham
	Penalties
	Griffiths (penalty missed); O'Neill (penalty scored); Galloway (penalty missed); Metcalfe (penalty scored); Jamieson (penalty missed); Colakovski (penalty scored); Tilio (penalty missed)		(penalty scored) Waine; (penalty missed) Laws; (penalty missed) Fenton; (penalty missed) Rufer; (penalty scored) Sotirio; (penalty scored) Lewis; (penalty scored) Pennington

29 January 2022 Semi-final	Melbourne Victory	4–1	Wellington Phoenix	Geelong
17:35 AEDT	Brillante 65'; D'Agostino 80', 90+1'; Folami 85'	Report	Hooper 39'	Stadium: GMHBA Stadium; Attendance: 2,034; Referee: Daniel Elder

== Squad statistics ==
=== Appearances and goals ===
No.	Pos	Nat	Player	Total		A-League		A-League Finals		FFA Cup	
No.	Pos	Nat	Player	Apps	Goals	Apps	Goals	Apps	Goals	Apps	Goals
Goalkeepers:
20	GK	(New Zealand) NZL	Oli Sail	26	0	23	0	1	0	2	0
30	GK	(New Zealand) NZL	Henry Gray	0	0	0	0	0	0	0	0
40	GK	(New Zealand) NZL	Alex Paulsen	6	0	3+1	0	0	0	2	0
Defenders:
3	DF	(North Macedonia) MKD	Matthew Bozinovski	4	0	0+2	0	0	0	1+1	0
4	DF	(England) ENG	Scott Wootton	19	2	18	2	1	0	0	0
5	DF	(New Zealand) NZL	James McGarry	17	0	10+5	0	0+1	0	0+1	0
6	DF	(New Zealand) NZL	Tim Payne	25	0	23	0	1	0	1	0
16	DF	(New Zealand) NZL	Louis Fenton	26	0	9+13	0	0	0	3+1	0
17	DF	(New Zealand) NZL	Callan Elliot	15	0	8+5	0	0	0	1+1	0
21	DF	(Australia) AUS	Joshua Laws	18	0	15	0	0	0	3	0
31	DF	(England) ENG	Kurtis Mogg	1	0	0	0	0	0	1	0
33	DF	(New Zealand) NZL	Finn Surman	18	0	11+3	0	1	0	2+1	0
Midfielders:
7	MF	(Mexico) MEX	Gael Sandoval	21	6	19	6	1	0	1	0
8	MF	(New Zealand) NZL	Ben Old	26	1	10+13	1	0+1	0	2	0
11	MF	(Australia) AUS	Jaushua Sotirio	24	8	15+4	6	0+1	0	2+2	2
13	MF	(Australia) AUS	Nicholas Pennington	27	1	12+10	1	1	0	4	0
14	MF	(New Zealand) NZL	Alex Rufer	17	0	14	0	0	0	3	0
19	MF	(New Zealand) NZL	Sam Sutton	27	1	20+2	1	1	0	3+1	0
23	MF	(New Zealand) NZL	Clayton Lewis	20	0	15+1	0	1	0	2+1	0
34	MF	(New Zealand) NZL	Jackson Manuel	5	0	1+4	0	0	0	0	0
38	MF	(New Zealand) NZL	Luis Toomey	0	0	0	0	0	0	0	0
Forwards:
9	FW	(England) ENG	David Ball	28	2	23	2	1	0	3+1	0
10	FW	(Australia) AUS	Reno Piscopo	24	4	17+4	4	1	0	2	0
18	FW	(New Zealand) NZL	Ben Waine	29	8	14+10	6	0+1	0	3+1	2
32	FW	(New Zealand) NZL	George Ott	3	0	0+2	0	0	0	0+1	0
36	FW	(New Zealand) NZL	Riley Bidois	5	0	1+4	0	0	0	0	0
43	FW	(New Zealand) NZL	Oskar van Hattum	10	0	0+8	0	0	0	1+1	0
88	FW	(England) ENG	Gary Hooper	16	5	9+5	4	1	0	1	1
Players that have left the club:
12	MF	(Australia) AUS	Luka Prso	2	1	0	0	0	0	1+1	1

- Source: Wellington Phoenix

=== Clean sheets ===
Includes all competitive matches. The list is sorted by squad number when total clean sheets are equal.

Rank	Pos.	No.	Player	A-League	A-League Finals	FFA Cup	Total
1	GK	20	(New Zealand) Oli Sail	5	0	1	6
2	GK	40	(New Zealand) Alex Paulsen	0	0	1	1

=== Disciplinary records ===
Includes all competitive matches. The list is sorted by squad number when total disciplinary records are equal.

Pos.	No.	Name	A-League		A-League Finals		FFA Cup		Total	
Pos.	No.	Name	Yellow card	Red card	Yellow card	Red card	Yellow card	Red card	Yellow card	Red card
FW	9	(England) David Ball	7	0	0	0	2	0	9	0
MF	13	(Australia) Nicholas Pennington	6	0	0	0	2	0	8	0
MF	14	(New Zealand) Alex Rufer	3	0	0	0	0	0	3	0
DF	16	(New Zealand) Louis Fenton	3	0	0	0	0	0	3	0
DF	17	(New Zealand) Callan Elliot	3	0	0	0	0	0	3	0
MF	19	(New Zealand) Sam Sutton	2	0	0	0	1	0	3	0
DF	21	(Australia) Joshua Laws	3	0	0	0	0	0	3	0
MF	23	(New Zealand) Clayton Lewis	2	0	1	0	0	0	3	0
DF	4	(England) Scott Wootton	2	0	0	0	0	0	2	0
DF	6	(New Zealand) Tim Payne	2	0	0	0	0	0	2	0
MF	7	(Mexico) Gael Sandoval	2	0	0	0	0	0	2	0
FW	10	(Australia) Reno Piscopo	2	0	0	0	0	0	2	0
FW	18	(New Zealand) Ben Waine	2	0	0	0	0	0	2	0
GK	20	(New Zealand) Oli Sail	2	0	0	0	0	0	2	0
DF	5	(New Zealand) James McGarry	1	0	0	0	0	0	1	0
MF	8	(New Zealand) Ben Old	0	0	0	0	1	0	1	0
MF	11	(Australia) Jaushua Sotirio	1	0	0	0	0	0	1	0
DF	33	(New Zealand) Finn Surman	1	0	0	0	0	0	1	0
FW	43	(New Zealand) Oskar van Hattum	1	0	0	0	0	0	1	0
FW	88	(England) Gary Hooper	1	0	0	0	0	0	1	0

== See also ==
- 2021–22 Wellington Phoenix FC (A-League Women) season
