= 2020–21 Wellington Phoenix FC season =

Wellington Phoenix
2020–21 season
- Chairman: Rob Morrison
- Manager: Ufuk Talay
- Stadium: WIN Stadium (Due to Coronavirus travel restrictions)
- A-League: 7th
- Top goalscorer: League: Tomer Hemed (11); All: Tomer Hemed (11)
- Highest home attendance: 24,105 (22 May 2021 vs. Western United
- Lowest home attendance: 1,184 (24 March 2021 vs. Melbourne Victory
- Average home league attendance: 5,329

The 2020–21 season was the Wellington Phoenix's 14th season since its establishment in 2007. The club participated in the A-League for the 14th time.

== Pre-season ==
On 27 August 2020, it was announced that Liberato Cacace had signed with Belgian club Sint-Truidense after they had paid a transfer fee of $2,100,000. On 6 September, the Phoenix announced that Callum McCowatt signed with Danish club Helsingør following the conclusion of his contract. On 12 September, it was announced that Gary Hooper had departed the club following the conclusion of his contract. On 14 September, the Phoenix announced the shock departure of captain Steven Taylor after mutually agreeing to terminate his contract. Both players joined the Indian Super League, signing with Kerala Blasters and Odisha, respectively. On 24 September, Phoenix youngster Callan Elliot signed a deal with Xanthi. On 18 October, it was reported that Matti Steinmann had signed with Indian club East Bengal despite no announcement from the Phoenix. On 19 October, it was announced that Brandon Wilson would be parting ways with the Phoenix. A week later, it was confirmed that Walter Scott would not extend his contract with the club, after he played as a trialist for Macarthur FC in a pre-season match.

On 15 October, it was announced that the 2020–21 A-League season would commence on 27 December. On 27 October, the Phoenix confirmed that their squad will move to Australia for the start of the new campaign. On 28 October 2020, the Phoenix announced the dual signings of All Whites Clayton Lewis and James McGarry on one-year deals. On 30 October, it was announced Joshua Laws had signed a one-year deal with the Phoenix. On 6 November, it was announced that Matthew Ridenton had returned to the Phoenix on a one-year deal. On 10 November, the Phoenix announced the signing of Mirza Muratovic on a one-year deal. On 30 November, the Phoenix announced the signing of Israeli International Tomer Hemed, as its marquee player on a one-year contract.

== Players ==
Note: Flags indicate national team as defined under FIFA eligibility rules; some limited exceptions apply. Players may hold more than one non-FIFA nationality.

No.	Pos.	Nation	Player
1	GK	NZL	Stefan Marinovic
2	DF	AUS	Liam McGing
3	DF	AUS	Luke DeVere
4	DF	NZL	Te Atawhai Hudson-Wihongi
5	MF	NZL	James McGarry
6	MF	NZL	Tim Payne
7	FW	AUS	Reno Piscopo
8	MF	AUS	Cameron Devlin
9	FW	ENG	David Ball
10	MF	MEX	Ulises Dávila (captain)
11	MF	AUS	Jaushua Sotirio
12	MF	NZL	Matthew Ridenton

No.	Pos.	Nation	Player
13	FW	AUS	Charles Lokolingoy
14	MF	NZL	Alex Rufer (vice-captain)
15	MF	AUS	Mirza Muratovic
16	DF	NZL	Louis Fenton
17	FW	ISR	Tomer Hemed
18	FW	NZL	Ben Waine
19	MF	NZL	Sam Sutton
20	GK	NZL	Oliver Sail
21	MF	AUS	Joshua Laws
23	MF	NZL	Clayton Lewis
27	DF	ENG	Steven Taylor

== Transfers ==
=== From youth squad ===
N	Pos.	Nat.	Name	Age	Notes
19	MF	(New Zealand)	Sam Sutton	18	3-year senior contract

=== Transfers in ===
No.	Position	Player	Transferred from	Type/fee	Contract length	Date	Ref
23	MF	Clayton Lewis	Auckland City	Free transfer	1 year	28 October 2020	
5	DF	James McGarry	Unattached	Free transfer	1 year	28 October 2020	
21	MF	(Australia) Joshua Laws	Unattached	Free transfer	1 year	30 October 2020	
12	MF	Matthew Ridenton	Unattached	Free transfer	1 year	6 November 2020	
15	FW	(Australia) Mirza Muratovic	Unattached	Free transfer	1 year	10 November 2020	
17	FW	(Israel) Tomer Hemed	Unattached	Free transfer	1 year	30 November 2020	
13	FW	(Australia) Charles Lokolingoy	Unattached	Free transfer	4 months	17 February 2021	
27	DF	(England) Steven Taylor	(India) Odisha	Free transfer	3 months	5 March 2021	

=== Transfers out ===
No.	Position	Player	Transferred to	Type/fee	Date	Ref
13	DF	Liberato Cacace	(Belgium) Sint-Truidense	$2,100,000	27 August 2020	
21	FW	Callum McCowatt	(Denmark) Helsingør	End of contract	6 September 2020	
88	FW	(England) Gary Hooper	(India) Kerala Blasters	End of contract	12 September 2020	
27	DF	(England) Steven Taylor	(India) Odisha	Mutual contract termination	14 September 2020	
17	DF	Callan Elliot	(Greece) Xanthi	End of contract	24 September 2020	
5	MF	(Germany) Matti Steinmann	(India) East Bengal	End of contract	18 October 2020	
12	MF	(Australia) Brandon Wilson	Perth Glory	Mutual contract termination	19 October 2020	
23	DF	(Australia) Walter Scott	Unattached	End of contract	25 October 2020	

=== Contract extensions ===
No.	Name	Position	Duration	Date	Notes
9	(England) David Ball	Striker	2 years	27 October 2020	
4	Te Atawhai Hudson-Wihongi	Defender	2 years	29 October 2020	
2	(Australia) Liam McGing	Centre-back	1 year	2 November 2020	
3	(Australia) Luke DeVere	Centre-back	1 year	6 November 2020	
23	Clayton Lewis	Attacking midfielder	2 years	18 May 2021	
20	Oliver Sail	Goalkeeper	2 years	19 May 2021	
18	Ben Waine	Forward	3 years	20 May 2021	
27	(England) Steven Taylor	Defender	1 year	4 June 2021	
16	Louis Fenton	Full-back	1 year	10 June 2021	

== Technical staff ==
Position	Name
Head coach	(Australia) Ufuk Talay
Assistant coach	(England) Chris Greenacre
Assistant coach/Head analyst	(Australia) Giancarlo Italiano
Goalkeeping coach	(England) Paul Gothard
Head physiotherapist	(Scotland) Ben Venn
Strength & conditioning coach	(New Zealand) Aidan Wivell

== Squad statistics ==
=== Appearances and goals ===
As of 25 April 2021

No.	Pos.	Player	A-League		Total	
No.	Pos.	Player	Apps	Goals	Apps	Goals
1	GK	(New Zealand) Stefan Marinovic	6	0	6	0
2	DF	(Australia) Liam McGing	6(1)	0	7	0
3	DF	(Australia) Luke DeVere	6	0	6	0
4	DF	(New Zealand) Te Atawhai Hudson-Wihongi	0(4)	0	4	0
5	DF	(New Zealand) James McGarry	15(3)	0	18	0
6	DF	(New Zealand) Tim Payne	19	0	19	0
7	FW	(Australia) Reno Piscopo	8(1)	1	9	1
8	MF	(Australia) Cameron Devlin	11(6)	1	17	1
9	FW	(England) David Ball	17	4	17	4
10	MF	(Mexico) Ulises Dávila	18(1)	7	19	7
11	FW	(Australia) Jaushua Sotirio	6(7)	3	13	3
12	MF	(New Zealand) Matthew Ridenton	2(6)	0	8	0
13	FW	(Australia) Charles Lokolingoy	0(7)	0	7	0
14	MF	(New Zealand) Alex Rufer	15(1)	0	16	0
15	MF	(Australia) Mirza Muratovic	3(5)	2	8	2
16	DF	(New Zealand) Louis Fenton	12(5)	2	17	2
17	FW	(Israel) Tomer Hemed	9(5)	5	14	5
18	FW	(New Zealand) Ben Waine	9(6)	6	15	5
19	MF	(New Zealand) Sam Sutton	3(2)	0	5	0
20	GK	(New Zealand) Oliver Sail	13	0	13	0
21	DF	(Australia) Joshua Laws	10(2)	0	12	0
23	MF	(New Zealand) Clayton Lewis	17(2)	1	19	1
27	DF	(England) Steven Taylor	3(2)	0	5	0

== Friendlies ==
20 November 2020	Blacktown Spartans (Australia)	1–8	(New Zealand) Wellington Phoenix	Sydney, Australia
21:00 NZST	? (?)	Report	Sotirio 5'; Ball 12', 14', 31'; Muratovic 26'; Trialist 46'; Piscopo 55'; Trialist 61'	Attendance: 0 (behind closed doors)

25 November 2020	APIA Leichhardt (Australia)	1–5	(New Zealand) Wellington Phoenix	Sydney, Australia
	? (?)	Report	Piscopo 17'; Sotirio 39'; Payne 42'; Trialist 73'; Trialist 85'	Attendance: 0 (behind closed doors)

2 December 2020	Macarthur FC (Australia)	1–0	(New Zealand) Wellington Phoenix	Sydney, Australia
13:00 NZDT	Derbyshire 1'	Report		Attendance: 0 (behind closed doors)

6 December 2020	Central Coast Mariners (Australia)	0–2	(New Zealand) Wellington Phoenix	Sydney, Australia
		Report	Waine 1'; Piscopo 37'	Attendance: 0 (behind closed doors)

12 December 2020	Western Sydney Wanderers (Australia)	1–3	(New Zealand) Wellington Phoenix	Sydney, Australia
	Pelekanos 80'	Report	DeVere 6'; Sotirio 24'; Ball 54'	Attendance: 0 (behind closed doors)

19 December 2020	Newcastle Jets (Australia)	3–4	(New Zealand) Wellington Phoenix	Newcastle, Australia
	Yuel 53'; Ugarkovic 80' (pen.); Yengi 89'	Report	Muratovic 12'; Rufer 30'; Lewis 45'; Sotirio 57'	Stadium: McDonald Jones Stadium; Attendance: 0 (behind closed doors)

17 January 2021	Wollongong Wolves (Australia)	4–0	(New Zealand) Wellington Phoenix	Wollongong, Australia
		Report		Attendance: 0 (behind closed doors)

== Competitions ==
Win Draw Loss

=== Overview ===
Competition	First match	Last match	Starting round	Final position	Record							
Competition	First match	Last match	Starting round	Final position	Pld	W	D	L	GF	GA	GD	Win %
A-League	2 January 2021	4 June 2021	Matchday 1	7th	26	10	8	8	44	34	+10	38.46
Total					26	10	8	8	44	34	+10	38.46

Source: Soccerway

=== A-League ===
==== League table ====
Pos	Team	Pld	W	D	L	GF	GA	GD	Pts	Qualification
5	Adelaide United	26	11	6	9	39	41	−2	39	Qualification for finals series (Note: The top two teams entered the finals series at the semi-finals, while the teams ranked third to sixth entered the finals series at the elimination-finals.)
6	Macarthur FC	26	11	6	9	33	36	−3	39	Qualification for finals series
7	Wellington Phoenix (Note: Wellington Phoenix cannot qualify for Asian Football Confederation competitions as they are based in New Zealand, which is under the Oceania Football Confederation.)	26	10	8	8	44	34	+10	38	
8	Western Sydney Wanderers	26	9	8	9	45	43	+2	35	
9	Perth Glory	26	9	7	10	44	44	0	34	Qualification for 2021 FFA Cup play-offs (Note: The top 8 teams qualified for the round of 32, while the bottom four teams participated in a playoff round.)

Source: A-Leagues
Rules for classification: 1) Points; 2) Goal difference; 3) Goals scored; 4) Least red cards; 5) Least yellow cards; 6) Toss of a coin in an event of a tie of two clubs.

==== Results summary ====
Overall								Home						Away					
Pld	W	D	L	GF	GA	GD	Pts	W	D	L	GF	GA	GD	W	D	L	GF	GA	GD
26	10	8	8	44	34	+10	38	5	3	5	24	19	+5	5	5	3	20	15	+5

Source: ultimatealeague.com

==== Matches ====
Win Draw Loss

2 January 2021 2	Wellington Phoenix	1–2	Sydney FC	Wollongong
17:00 AEDT	Muratovic 45+1'	Report	Nieuwenhof 29'; Brattan 55'	Stadium: WIN Stadium; Attendance: 3,637; Referee: Alex King

9 January 2021 3	Macarthur FC	1–1	Wellington Phoenix	Sydney
17:00 AEDT	Susaeta 67'	Report	Ball 39'	Stadium: Campbelltown Stadium; Attendance: 2,609; Referee: Stephen Lucas

24 January 2021 5	Wellington Phoenix	1–2	Newcastle Jets	Wollongong
19:00 AEST	Dávila 85' (pen.)	Report	Yuel 8'; O'Donovan 51'	Stadium: WIN Stadium; Attendance: 1,742; Referee: Alex King

31 January 2021 6	Central Coast Mariners	1–2	Wellington Phoenix	Gosford
16:00 AEST	Kuol 41'	Report	Dávila 15'; Sotirio 88'	Stadium: Central Coast Stadium; Attendance: 4,748; Referee: Daniel Elder

8 February 2021 7	Sydney FC	2–1	Wellington Phoenix	Sydney
19:10 AEST	Barbarouses 32', 64'	Report	Dávila 90'	Stadium: Netstrata Jubilee Stadium; Attendance: 5,220; Referee: Chris Beath

14 February 2021 8	Wellington Phoenix	0–2	Central Coast Mariners	Wollongong
16:05 AEST		Report	Simon 40'; Bozanic 50' (pen.)	Stadium: WIN Stadium; Attendance: 2,248; Referee: Daniel Elder

21 February 2021 9	Wellington Phoenix	2–2	Western Sydney Wanderers	Wollongong
18:10 AEST	Muratovic 9'; Fenton 79'	Report	Yeboah 71'; Kamau 76'	Stadium: WIN Stadium; Attendance: 3,383; Referee: Alireza Faghani

24 February 2021 9	Melbourne Victory	2–0	Wellington Phoenix	Melbourne
19:05 AEST	Gestede 45+3', 48'	Report		Stadium: AAMI Park; Attendance: 3,424; Referee: Shaun Evans

28 February 2021 10	Newcastle Jets	0–2	Wellington Phoenix	Newcastle
18:10 AEST		Report	Ball 22'; Waine 53'	Stadium: McDonald Jones Stadium; Attendance: 4,576; Referee: Jonathan Barreiro

7 March 2021 11	Wellington Phoenix	3–0	Perth Glory	Wollongong
16:00 AEST	Piscopo 30'; Ball 35'; Waine 59'	Report		Stadium: WIN Stadium; Attendance: 2,331; Referee: Adam Kersey

15 March 2021 12	Western Sydney Wanderers	4–3	Wellington Phoenix	Sydney
19:05 AEST	Wilmering 23'; Mutch 52'; Duke 65'; Yeboah 84'	Report	Dávila 7'; Devlin 32'; Hemed 64' (pen.)	Stadium: Bankwest Stadium; Attendance: 5,477; Referee: Shaun Evans

21 March 2021 13	Wellington Phoenix	1–1	Brisbane Roar	Newcastle
16:00 AEST	Hemed 42'	Report	Mebrahtu 86'	Stadium: McDonald Jones Stadium; Attendance: 1,432; Referee: Stephen Lucas

24 March 2021 13	Wellington Phoenix	4–1	Melbourne Victory	Wollongong
19:05 AEST	Hemed 11'; Ball 36'; Dávila 62'; Lewis 68'	Report	Kamsoba 76'	Stadium: WIN Stadium; Attendance: 1,184; Referee: Shaun Evans

28 March 2021 14	Wellington Phoenix	0–1	Macarthur FC	Wollongong
16:00 AEST		Report	Genreau 65'	Stadium: WIN Stadium; Attendance: 2,516; Referee: Adam Fielding

5 April 2021 15	Wellington Phoenix	2–3	Melbourne City	Wollongong
19:00 AEST	Hemed 39'; Dávila 56'	Report	Good 17'; Maclaren 45'; Tilio 83'	Stadium: WIN Stadium; Attendance: 1,343; Referee: Alireza Faghani

11 April 2021 16	Wellington Phoenix	3–2	Western United	Wollongong
19:00 AEST	Dávila 45+1' (pen.); Sotirio 53'; Waine 90'	Report	Berisha 32' (pen.); Guarrotxena 56'	Stadium: WIN Stadium; Attendance: 1,226; Referee: Chris Beath

18 April 2021 17	Perth Glory	1–3	Wellington Phoenix	Perth
18:15 AWST	Chianese 58'	Report	Waine 56'; Fenton 66'; Sotirio 75'	Stadium: HBF Park; Attendance: 9,229; Referee: Daniel Elder

22 April 2021 17	Western United	1–1	Wellington Phoenix	Tasmania
19:00 AEDT	Wales 27'	Report	Waine 7'	Stadium: UTAS Stadium; Attendance: 2,528; Referee: Alex King

25 April 2021 18	Wellington Phoenix	2–1	Adelaide United	Wollongong
16:10 AEST	Waine 58'; Hemed 90+7' (pen.)	Report	Mauk 51'	Stadium: WIN Stadium; Attendance: 1,903; Referee: Adam Kersey

1 May 2021 19	Brisbane Roar	0–0	Wellington Phoenix	Brisbane
17:05 AEDT		Report		Stadium: Dolphin Oval; Attendance: 5,897; Referee: Tim Danaskos

7 May 2021 20	Adelaide United	0–0	Wellington Phoenix	Adelaide
19:35 ACDT		Report		Stadium: Coopers Stadium; Attendance: 7,172; Referee: Alireza Faghani

16 May 2021 21	Melbourne City	2–2	Wellington Phoenix	Melbourne
16:05 AEST	Tsubaki 58'; Maclaren 81'	Report	Hemed 37' (pen.), 88'	Stadium: AAMI Park; Attendance: 4,586; Referee: Alireza Faghani

22 May 2021 22	Wellington Phoenix	3–0	Western United	Wellington
14:05 NZDT	Lewis 38'; Piscopo 57'; Hemed 63'	Report		Stadium: Sky Stadium; Attendance: 24,105; Referee: Daniel Elder

26 May 2021 22	Western Sydney Wanderers	1–2	Wellington Phoenix	Sydney
19:05 AEST	Baccus 28'	Report	Ball 24'; Hemed 42'	Stadium: Bankwest Stadium; Attendance: 5,068; Referee: Kurt Ams

30 May 2021 23	Wellington Phoenix	2–2	Perth Glory	Auckland
13:35 NZDT	Hemed 24'; Sotirio 80'	Report	Fornaroli 61'; Timmins 75'	Stadium: Eden Park; Attendance: 22,233; Referee: Alex King

4 June 2021 24	Macarthur FC	0–3	Wellington Phoenix	Campbelltown
19:05 AEST		Report	Ball 45+1'; Hemed 46'; Waine 90+2'	Stadium: Campbelltown Stadium; Attendance: 5,126; Referee: Daniel Elder
