= Sam Sutton (footballer) =

New Zealand footballer (born 2001)

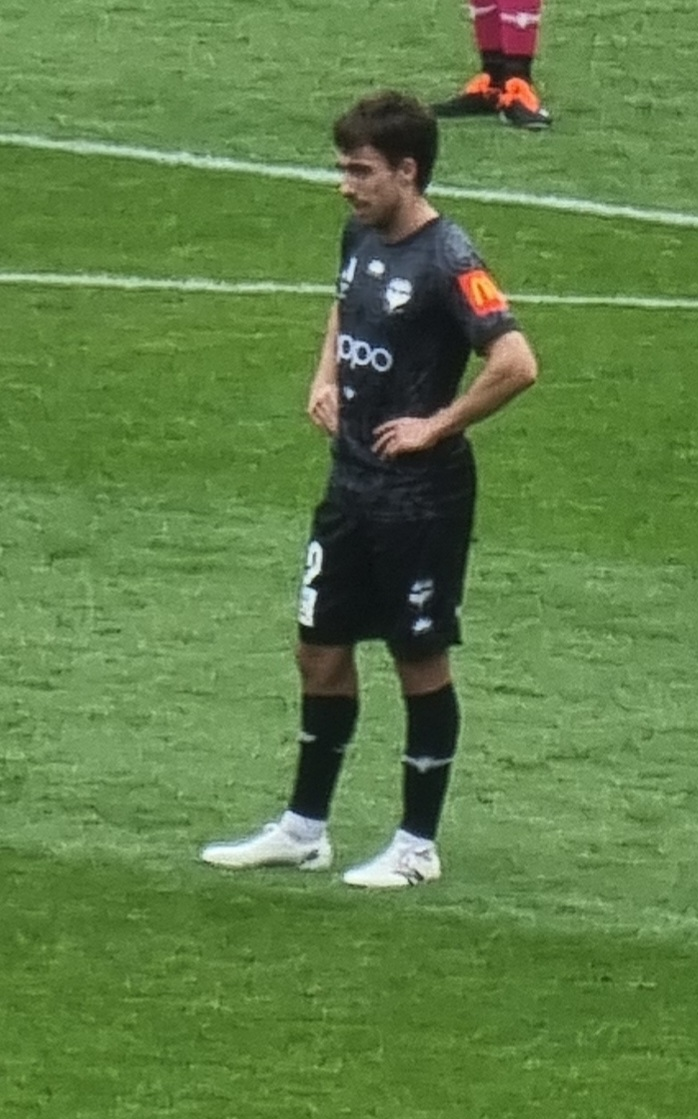
- Sutton playing for Wellington Phoenix in 2024.

Personal information
- Full name: Sam Harry Sutton
- Date of birth: 10 December 2001 (age 24)
- Place of birth: Auckland, New Zealand
- Height: 1.75 m (5 ft 9 in)
- Position: Left-back

Team information
- Current team: Perth Glory
- Number: 3

Youth career
- –2016: East Coast Bays

Senior career*
Years	Team	Apps	(Gls)
2016–2022	Wellington Phoenix Reserves	44	(3)
2019–2025	Wellington Phoenix	98	(3)
2025–	Perth Glory	19	(0)

International career^{‡}
2021–	New Zealand U23	7	(1)
2024–	New Zealand	5	(0)
Medal record
Men's football
Representing New Zealand
OFC Nations Cup
Winner	2024 Fiji/Vanuatu
- * Club domestic league appearances and goals as of 16 January 2026 ‡ National team caps and goals as of 18 November 2024

Sam Harry Sutton (born 10 December 2001) is a New Zealand professional footballer who plays as a left-back for A-League Men club Perth Glory and the New Zealand national team.

== Club career ==
=== Wellington Phoenix Reserves ===
Sutton joined the Wellington Phoenix as part of their academy in 2016 after moving down from Auckland. He started playing for the Wellington Phoenix Reserves in the New Zealand Football Championship in the 2016–17 season, making 4 appearances with 2 starts. His debut in the national league was two weeks before he turned 15 when he came on in their away game against Southern United with the team leading 1–0 and looking for their first back-to-back wins in the reserve team's history.

=== Wellington Phoenix ===
Sutton started training with the first team players during pre-season July 2019. On 21 December 2019, Sutton made his A-League debut as a stoppage time substitute in the Phoenix 2–2 draw against Sydney FC in Sydney. He followed that up with another 25 mins and his Sky Stadium home debut against Western Sydney Wanderers

Sutton got his first start on the 25 July 2020 in a 1–1 draw with Adelaide United playing for 60 minutes in an attacking midfield role. With young teammates Callan Elliot and Te Atawhai Hudson-Wihongi also starting alongside Sutton, the starting XI in this match was the youngest in club history, with an average age of 25.02 years.

On the 29 October 2020, Sutton signed a three-year deal with the Phoenix, his first professional contract with the club. On 21 March 2022, Sutton extended his contract with the Phoenix for a further two years until the end of the 2024–25 season.

=== Personal life ===
Sutton grew up on Auckland's North Shore and played for East Coast Bays as a junior. He was spotted by Wellington Phoenix's Academy Director Paul Temple at 12 years old and was asked to attend the Academy. After moving to Wellington with his family, Sutton enrolled at Wellington College while training with the Phoenix academy.

== International career ==
On 12 July 2021, Sutton made his debut for the New Zealand U23's in a pre-Olympic friendly against Australia. Sutton scored his first goal for the New Zealand U23's from the penalty spot, in a 2–0 win over China on 23 March 2023. He was also named captain for this first time during this game.

== Career statistics ==
=== Club ===
As of match played on 14 May 2025.

Appearances and goals by club, season and competition
Club	Season	League			Cup		Others		Total	
Club	Season	Division	Apps	Goals	Apps	Goals	Apps	Goals	Apps	Goals
Wellington Phoenix Reserves	2016–17	Premiership	4	0	—		—		4	0
Wellington Phoenix Reserves	2017–18	Premiership	14	0	—		—		14	0
Wellington Phoenix Reserves	2018–19	Premiership	18	0	—		—		18	0
Wellington Phoenix Reserves	2019–20	Premiership	7	2	—		—		7	2
Wellington Phoenix Reserves	2022	National League	1	1	—		—		1	1
Wellington Phoenix Reserves	Total		44	3	—		—		44	3
Wellington Phoenix	2019–20	A-League	4	0	0	0	0	0	4	0
Wellington Phoenix	2020–21	A-League	12	0	—		—		12	0
Wellington Phoenix	2021–22	A-League Men	21	1	4	0	1 (Note: Appearance in A-League Men Finals)	0	26	1
Wellington Phoenix	2022–23	A-League Men	15	1	3	0	0	0	18	1
Wellington Phoenix	2023–24	A-League Men	20	0	1	0	2	0	23	0
Wellington Phoenix	2024–25	A-League Men	23	1	1 (Note: Appearance in 2025 Australia Cup)	0	—		24	1
Wellington Phoenix	Total		95	3	9	0	3	0	107	3
Perth Glory	2025–26	A-League Men	19	0	1	0	—		20	0
Career total			139	6	9	0	3	0	151	6

=== International ===
As of match played on 30 June 2024.

Appearances and goals by national team and year
National team	Year	Apps	Goals
New Zealand	2024	3	0
Total		3	0

== Honours ==
New Zealand

- OFC Nations Cup: 2024
