= Wellington Phoenix FC records and statistics =

Superlatives related to the New Zealand association football club

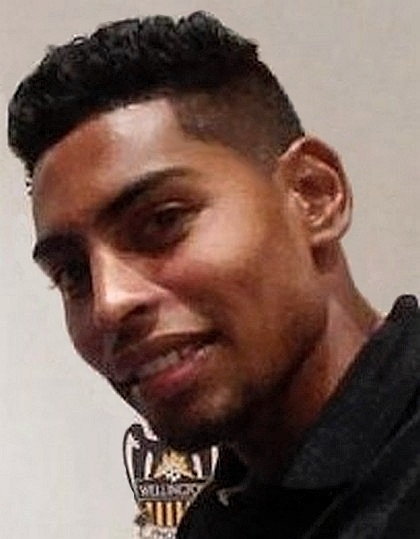
Roy Krishna is the Wellington Phoenix's record goalscorer.

Wellington Phoenix Football Club is a New Zealand professional association football club based in Wellington Central, Wellington. The club was formed in 2007 to be the second New Zealand member admitted into the A-League Men after the demise of New Zealand Knights.

The list encompasses the honours won by Wellington Phoenix, records set by the club, their managers and their players. The player records section itemises the club's leading goalscorers and those who have made most appearances in first-team competitions. Attendance records at Wellington and WIN Stadium, their temporary home ground.

All figures current as of the match played on 14 January 2024.

== Honours ==
=== Domestic ===
- A-League Pre-Season Challenge Cup

Runners-up (1): 2008

== Player records ==
=== Appearances ===
- Most A-League Men appearances: Andrew Durante, 273
- Most Australia Cup appearances: Alex Rufer, 6
- Youngest first-team player: Ben Waine, 17 years, 57 days (against Bentleigh Greens, FFA Cup Round of 32, 7 August 2018)
- Oldest first-team player: Tony Warner, 37 years, 242 days (against Perth Glory, A-League, 8 January 2012)
- Most consecutive appearances: Chris Greenacre, 68 (from 22 January 2010 to 7 April 2012)

==== Most appearances ====
Competitive matches only, includes appearances as substitute. Numbers in brackets indicate goals scored.

#	Player	Years	A-League Men	National Cup^{a}	Total
1	(New Zealand) Andrew Durante	2008–2019	273 (4)	8 (0)	**281** (4)
2	(Australia) Vince Lia	2007–2017	197 (4)	5 (0)	**202** (4)
3	(Malta) Manny Muscat	2008–2016	192 (4)	4 (0)	**196** (4)
4	(New Zealand) **Alex Rufer**	2013–	187 (7)	11 (0)	**198** (7)
5	(New Zealand) Ben Sigmund	2008–2016	181 (7)	6 (0)	**187** (7)
6	(New Zealand) Louis Fenton	2012–2017; 2018–2022	158 (9)	6 (0)	**164** (9)
7	(New Zealand) Glen Moss	2007–2009; 2012–2017	140 (0)	10 (0)	**150** (0)
8	(New Zealand) Tony Lochhead	2007–2013	131 (1)	7 (0)	**138** (1)
9	(New Zealand) Leo Bertos	2008–2014	127 (9)	4 (0)	**131** (9)
10	(Fiji) Roy Krishna	2014–2019	122 (51)	5 (1)	**127** (52)

a. Includes the A-League Pre-Season Challenge Cup and Australia Cup

=== Goalscorers ===
- Most goals in a season: Roy Krishna, 19 goals (in 2018–19 season)
- Most league goals in a season: Roy Krishna, 18 goals in the A-League, 2018–19
- Youngest goalscorer: Luke Brooke-Smith 16 years, 261 days (against Auckland FC, A-League, 22 February 2025)
- Oldest goalscorer: Eugene Dadi, 36 years, 205 days (against Sydney FC, A-League preliminary final, 13 March 2010)

==== Top goalscorers ====
Competitive matches only, includes appearances as substitute. Numbers in brackets indicate goals scored. Current players are in bold.

#	Name	Years	A-League Men	National Cup^{a}	Total	Ratio
1	(Fiji) Roy Krishna	2014–2019	51 (122)	1 (5)	**52** (127)	0.41
2	(New Zealand) Kosta Barbarouses	2007–2010; 2016-2017; 2022-2025	33 (121)	2 (7)	**35** (128)	0.21
3	(Barbados) Paul Ifill	2009–2014	33 (106)	0 (0)	**33** (106)	0.31
4	(New Zealand) Shane Smeltz	2007–2009; 2016–2017	24 (51)	4 (9)	**28** (60)	0.47
5	(New Zealand) Jeremy Brockie	2012–2015	23 (58)	0 (1)	**23** (59)	0.39
5	(New Zealand) Tim Brown	2007–2012	23 (112)	0 (0)	**23** (112)	0.21
7	(Poland) Oskar Zawada	2022-2024	22 (40)	0 (0)	**22** (40)	0.55
7	(New Zealand) Ben Waine	2018–2023	17 (73)	5 (9)	**22** (82)	0.27
9	(Mexico) Ulises Dávila	2019–2021	19 (50)	0 (0)	**19** (50)	0.38
9	(England) Chris Greenacre	2009–2012	19 (84)	0 (0)	**19** (84)	0.23

== Managerial records ==
- First full-time manager: Ricki Herbert managed Wellington Phoenix from March 2007 to February 2013.
- Longest serving manager: Ricki Herbert – 5 years, 343 days (19 March 2007 to 25 February 2013)
- Shortest tenure as manage: Chris Greenacre – 2 months, 23 days (26 February 2013 to 19 May 2013)
- Highest win percentage: Ufuk Talay, 41.84%
- Lowest win percentage: Chris Greenacre, 16.67%

== Club records ==
=== Matches ===
==== Firsts ====
- First match: Central Coast Mariners 2–0 Wellington Phoenix, A-League Pre-Season Challenge Cup, 14 July 2007
- First A-League Men match: Wellington Phoenix 2–2 Melbourne Victory, 26 August 2007
- First national cup match: Central Coast Mariners 2–0 Wellington Phoenix, A-League Pre-Season Challenge Cup, 14 July 2007

==== Record wins ====
- Record A-League Men win:
  - 6–0 against Gold Coast United, A-League, 25 October 2009
  - 8–2 against Central Coast Mariners, A-League, 9 March 2019
- Record national cup win: 4–0 against Devonport City, Australia Cup Round of 32, 3 August 2022

==== Record defeats ====
- Record A-League Men defeat:
  - 1–7 against Sydney FC, A-League, 19 January 2013
  - 0–6 against Melbourne City, A-League, 2 April 2022
- Record national cup defeat: 1–5 against Melbourne City, FFA Cup Round of 16, 26 August 2015

==== Record consecutive results ====
- Record consecutive wins: 5, from 30 January 2010 to 7 March 2010
- Record consecutive defeats: 9, from 20 March 2016 to 31 October 2016
- Record consecutive matches without a defeat: 13, from 11 April 2021 to 27 November 2021
- Record consecutive matches without a win: 11, from 31 March 2013 to 19 December 2013
- Record consecutive matches without conceding a goal: 3, from 30 January 2010 to 12 February 2010
- Record consecutive matches without scoring a goal: 3
  - from 4 January 2008 to 19 January 2008
  - from 30 August 2008 to 21 September 2008
  - from 29 March 2015 to 12 April 2015
  - from 8 October 2016 to 23 October 2016
  - from 27 January 2018 to 11 February 2018
  - from 28 October 2018 to 9 November 2018

=== Goals ===
- Most league goals scored in a season: 46 in 27 matches, A-League, 2018–19
- Fewest league goals scored in a season: 23 in 21 matches, A-League, 2008–09
- Most league goals conceded in a season: 55 in 27 matches, A-League, 2017–18
- Fewest league goals conceded in a season: 26 in 27 matches, A-League, 2023–24

=== Points ===
- Most points in a season: 53 in 27 matches, A-League, 2023–24
- Fewest points in a season: 20 in 21 matches, A-League, 2007–08

=== Attendances ===
This section applies to attendances at Wellington, the club's present home since foundation and WIN Stadium, where Wellington Phoenix temporarily played their home matches from 2021 to 2022 due to COVID-19 pandemic troubles in Wellington.

- Highest attendance in Wellington: 33,297 against Melbourne Victory, A-League Men Finals Series, 18 May 2024
- Lowest attendance in Wellington: 3,677 against Macarthur FC, A-League Men, 22 November 2025
- Highest attendance at WIN Stadium: 3,637 against Sydney FC, A-League, 2 January 2021
- Lowest attendance at WIN Stadium: 586 against Western United, A-League Men, 21 January 2022
