= Ben Waine =

New Zealand footballer (born 2001)

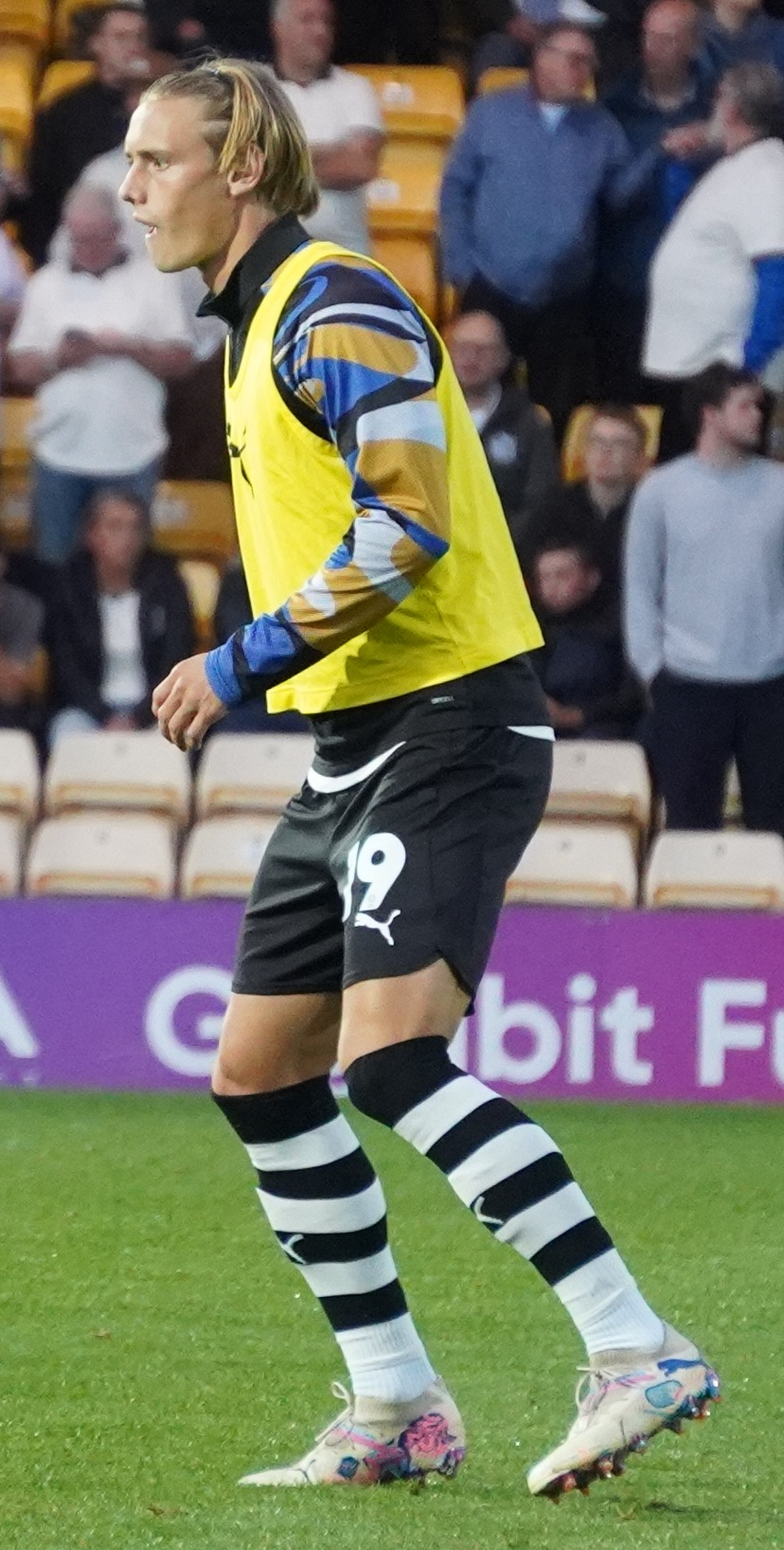
- Waine in Port Vale colours (2025)

Personal information
- Full name: Benjamin Peter Waine
- Date of birth: 11 June 2001 (age 25)
- Place of birth: Wellington, New Zealand
- Height: 1.79 m (5 ft 10 in)
- Position: Forward

Team information
- Current team: Port Vale
- Number: 19

Youth career
- 2015–2017: Wellington Phoenix

Senior career*
Years	Team	Apps	(Gls)
2017–2020	Wellington Phoenix Reserves	38	(15)
2018–2022	Wellington Phoenix	71	(17)
2018	Wellington United	14	(11)
2023–2025	Plymouth Argyle	43	(3)
2024–2025	→ Mansfield Town (loan)	25	(2)
2025–	Port Vale	33	(3)

International career^{‡}
2019	New Zealand U20	3	(3)
2019–2021	New Zealand U23	11	(9)
2022–	New Zealand	35	(11)
Medal record
Men's football
Representing New Zealand
OFC Nations Cup
Winner	2024 Fiji/Vanuatu
- * Club domestic league appearances and goals as of 16:49, 10 October 2026 (UTC) ‡ National team caps and goals as of 21:19, 5 October 2026 (UTC)

Benjamin Peter Waine (born 11 June 2001) is a New Zealand professional footballer who plays as a forward for EFL League Two club Port Vale and the New Zealand national team.

Waine began his career with Wellington Phoenix, playing for the Reserves in the New Zealand Football Championship. He made his A-League debut in August 2018, becoming the youngest player and goalscorer in the club's history at age 17 and 18, respectively. He was sold to English club Plymouth Argyle in December 2022, who he helped to win the League One title at the end of the 2022–23 season. He spent the 2024–25 campaign on loan at Mansfield Town. He left Plymouth in June 2025 and signed for Port Vale.

He represented New Zealand at under-20 and under-23 level, competing at the 2020 and 2024 Summer Olympics. He made his debut for the senior team in March 2022 and won the 2024 OFC Nations Cup, scoring four goals in the tournament.

== Early and personal life ==
Benjamin Peter Waine was born on 11 June 2001 in Wellington, New Zealand. He attended school at Hutt International Boys' School in Upper Hutt, where he was the Junior school captain in 2019. He is a dual citizen of New Zealand and the United Kingdom, as his parents are both from England. He supports Newcastle United as his mother's family are Geordies.

== Club career ==
=== Wellington Phoenix ===
Waine joined the academy at Wellington Phoenix at the age of 14. On 7 August 2018, Waine made his debut for the senior side in their FFA Cup loss to Bentleigh Greens. At the age of 17 years and 57 days, this made him the youngest player in the club's history. He played most of his games for the Wellington Phoenix Reserves in the New Zealand Football Championship, scoring a team high of eight goals, before head coach Marko Rudan called up to the senior team again in March. On 30 March, Waine made his league debut for the Phoenix, coming on as a substitute in their 4–1 win over the Newcastle Jets at the Westpac Stadium. On 28 April, he made his first league start for the Phoenix in a 5–0 loss to the Perth Glory.

In June 2019, Waine signed a two-year contract with the Phoenix. The first year was a scholarship deal, with the second year moving him onto a full-time contract. Just before the 2019–20 season kicked off, the first year of this contract was upgraded to full-time. On 3 November, Waine scored his first professional goal off the bench in Wellington's 3–2 loss to Melbourne City to become the youngest goalscorer in the club's history at 18 years and 145 days. He continued to score goals for Chris Greenacre's Reserve team, before injuries to Tomer Hemed and Jaushua Sotirio and a suspension for David Ball gave him the opportunity to play games for the senior team. He established himself as a key player in the 2020–21 campaign, becoming the youngest Phoenix player to score five A-League goals in a single season, and the fourth player in the club's history to score in four consecutive games, securing himself a nomination for A-League Young Footballer of the Year. He rejected an offer from English club Coventry City to instead sign a new three-year deal with Wellington.

Waine scored six league goals in the 2021–22 season, finishing as the club's joint top-scorer alongside Gael Sandoval and Jaushua Sotirio. He began the 2022–23 campaign in good scoring form, hitting three goals as Wellington reached the quarter-finals of the FFA Cup. He scored a total of 17 goals in 73 A-League matches, and was dubbed the "Waine Train" by Nix fans before he departed at the age of 21, with head coach Ufuk Talay remarking that "he's hopefully going off to bigger and better things and continues to have success in his career".

=== Plymouth Argyle ===
On 30 December 2022, Waine agreed to join English League One leaders Plymouth Argyle for an undisclosed six-figure fee on a two-and-a-half-year deal, the transfer going through on 1 January when the transfer window opened. Director of football Neil Dewsnip confirmed that the club had first attempted to sign the player the previous summer. He made his first start for the Pilgrims on 4 February, leading the line in a 3–4–2–1 formation in a 1–0 defeat at Sheffield Wednesday, though was taken off at half-time for tactical reasons. He scored two goals in 11 matches in the second half of the 2022–23 promotion-winning season, though was behind Ryan Hardie and Niall Ennis in the pecking order and missed the later stages after picking up an ankle injury.

Now in the Championship, he made nine starts and 23 substitute appearances in the league in the 2023–24 season, scoring two goals. He also scored three goals in the EFL Cup, including against Premier League club Crystal Palace at Home Park. Speaking in November, manager Steven Schumacher said that "he's desperate to learn, he's desperate to get better and I think we're seeing that in his performances". Schumacher left the club in January and new manager Ian Foster continued to give him opportunities off the bench ahead of Mustapha Bundu.

He featured on the left of an attacking trio in two of the new manager Wayne Rooney's opening three games of the 2024–25 campaign. On 30 August 2024, Waine returned to League One with Mansfield Town on a season-long loan to gain some more game time at Field Mill. He started two league games for the Stags, scoring three goals in 29 overall appearances. Manager Nigel Clough explained that "if we were halfway up the league or something like that, or in a better run, he would have played more, but his attitude has been absolutely fantastic all season". He left Plymouth Argyle after the relegated club opted against taking up a 12-month extension on his contract.

=== Port Vale ===
On 30 June 2025, Waine agreed to join newly promoted League One club Port Vale on a two-year contract. Manager Darren Moore said that "he's a young striker who will come in and give us something different". However, Waine fell down the pecking order following the deadline day signing of Devante Cole. He scored his first two goals for the club playing on the left wing at the start of December, having not played a game for the club since September. New manager Jon Brady played him as part of a front two. On 3 March 2026, he scored an extra-time winner against Bristol City to put the Vale into the fifth round of the FA Cup. Five days later, he scored the only goal of the game against Premier League side Sunderland in the fifth round, and celebrated the goal in the style of Alan Shearer. This later won him the club's Goal of the Season award. His eight goals made him the club's joint top scorer in the 2025–26 season, which culminated in relegation.

== International career ==
On 16 April 2019, Waine was selected as one of the 21 players for the New Zealand U-20 who played at the 2019 FIFA U-20 World Cup in Poland. He scored a brace in their opening match against Honduras on 24 May. He made two further appearances in the tournament, starting in both New Zealand's 2–0 victory over Norway and the 1–1 loss on penalties to Colombia in the Round of 16. In September, Waine was a member of the New Zealand U-23 team, known as the "Oly-Whites", who took part in the 2019 OFC Olympic Qualifying Tournament. He was second top goal scorer for the tournament with eight goals including one in the final, helping New Zealand to qualify for the 2020 Summer Olympics in Tokyo. He went on to compete at the 2024 Summer Olympics in Paris, scoring the winning goal against Guinea at the Allianz Riviera in the group stages.

Waine made his senior international debut on 18 March 2022, scoring his first senior international goal in New Zealand's World Cup qualification match against Papua New Guinea, winning the game 1–0. He established himself as the back up to captain Chris Wood. He scored four goals at the 2024 OFC Nations Cup and played the first 73 minutes of the final, a 3–0 victory over Vanuatu. He was named in the squad for the 2026 FIFA World Cup in North America by head coach Darren Bazeley, though did not make it onto the pitch.

== Style of play ==
Waine is a pacey forward, noted for his agility and work rate.

== Career statistics ==
=== Club ===
As of match played 10 October 2026

Appearances and goals by club, season and competition
Club	Season	League			National cup (Note: Includes FFA Cup, FA Cup)		League cup (Note: Includes EFL Cup)		Other		Total	
Club	Season	Division	Apps	Goals	Apps	Goals	Apps	Goals	Apps	Goals	Apps	Goals
Wellington Phoenix Reserves	2017–18	NZ Premiership	16	0	—		—		—		16	0
Wellington Phoenix Reserves	2018–19	NZ Premiership	17	8	—		—		—		17	8
Wellington Phoenix Reserves	2019–20	NZ Premiership	5	7	—		—		—		5	7
Wellington Phoenix Reserves	Total		38	15	—		—		—		38	15
Wellington United	2018	Central League	14	11	1	1	—		—		15	12
Wellington Phoenix	2018–19	A-League	3	0	1	0	—		0	0	4	0
Wellington Phoenix	2019–20	A-League	14	1	1	0	—		1 (Note: Appearance(s) in A-League Men finals series)	0	16	1
Wellington Phoenix	2020–21	A-League	22	7	—		—		—		22	7
Wellington Phoenix	2021–22	A-League	24	6	4	2	—		1	0	29	8
Wellington Phoenix	2022–23	A-League Men	8	3	3	3	—		0	0	11	6
Wellington Phoenix	Total		71	17	9	5	—		2	0	82	22
Plymouth Argyle	2022–23	League One	10	1	—		—		1 (Note: Appearance(s) in EFL Trophy)	1	11	2
Plymouth Argyle	2023–24	Championship	32	2	2	0	2	3	—		36	5
Plymouth Argyle	2024–25	Championship	1	0	0	0	1	1	—		2	1
Plymouth Argyle	Total		43	3	2	0	3	4	1	1	49	8
Mansfield Town (loan)	2024–25	League One	25	2	2	1	—		2	0	29	3
Port Vale	2025–26	League One	27	3	5	3	1	0	4	2	37	8
Port Vale	2026–27	League Two	7	0	0	0	1	0	0	0	8	0
Port Vale	Total		34	3	5	3	2	0	4	2	45	8
Career total			225	51	19	10	5	4	9	3	258	68

=== International ===
As of match played 5 October 2026

Appearances and goals by national team and year
National Team	Year	Apps	Goals
New Zealand	2022	7	1
New Zealand	2023	4	0
New Zealand	2024	11	7
New Zealand	2025	6	0
New Zealand	2026	7	3
Total		35	11

Scores and results list the New Zealand goal tally first.

List of international goals scored by Ben Waine
No.	Date	Venue	Opponent	Score	Result	Competition
1.	17 March 2022	Qatar SC Stadium, Doha, Qatar	Papua New Guinea	1–0	1–0	2022 FIFA World Cup qualification
2.	18 June 2024	Freshwater Stadium, Port Vila, Vanuatu	Solomon Islands	1–0	3–0	2024 OFC Men's Nations Cup
3.	18 June 2024	Freshwater Stadium, Port Vila, Vanuatu	Solomon Islands	2–0	3–0	2024 OFC Men's Nations Cup
4.	27 June 2024	Freshwater Stadium, Port Vila, Vanuatu	Tahiti	2–0	5–0	2024 OFC Men's Nations Cup
5.	27 June 2024	Freshwater Stadium, Port Vila, Vanuatu	Tahiti	4–0	5–0	2024 OFC Men's Nations Cup
6.	10 September 2024	TQL Stadium, Cincinnati, United States	United States	1–1	1–1	Friendly
7.	11 October 2024	Freshwater Stadium, Port Vila, Vanuatu	Tahiti	3–0	3–0	2026 FIFA World Cup qualification
8.	18 November 2024	Mount Smart Stadium, Auckland, New Zealand	Samoa	8–0	8–0	2026 FIFA World Cup qualification
9.	30 March 2026	Eden Park, Auckland, New Zealand	Chile	4–0	4–1	2026 FIFA Series
10.	24 September 2026	Tongliang Long Stadium, Chongqing, China	Palestine	1–0	2–2	Friendly
11.	27 September 2026	Longxing Football Stadium, Chongqing, China	China	2–0	3–0	Friendly

== Honours ==
Plymouth Argyle

- EFL League One: 2022–23

New Zealand

- OFC Men's Nations Cup: 2024
