= Oliver Sail =

New Zealand footballer

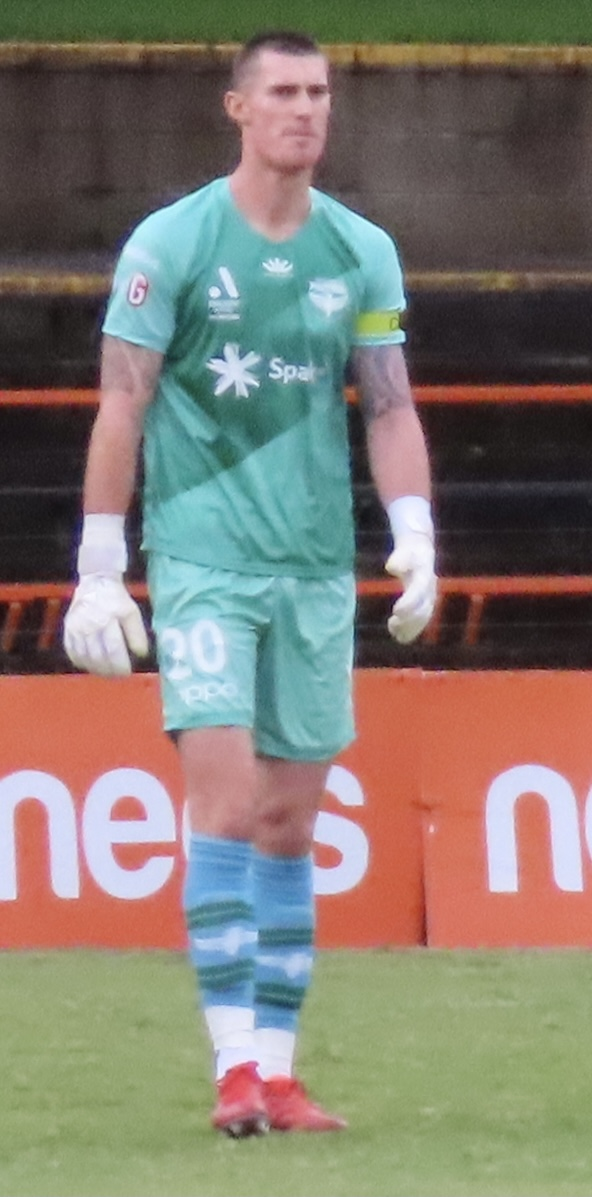
- Sail playing for Wellington Phoenix in 2022

Personal information
- Full name: Oliver Steven Edward Sail
- Date of birth: 13 January 1996 (age 30)
- Place of birth: Auckland, New Zealand
- Height: 1.97 m (6 ft 6 in)
- Position: Goalkeeper

Team information
- Current team: Auckland FC
- Number: 20

Senior career*
Years	Team	Apps	(Gls)
2013–2014	Auckland City	1	(0)
2014–2023	Wellington Phoenix Reserves	52	(0)
2014–2023	Wellington Phoenix	79	(0)
2023–2025	Perth Glory	31	(0)
2025–	Auckland FC	1	(0)
2025	Auckland FC Reserves	2	(0)

International career^{‡}
2015	New Zealand U20	2	(0)
2022–	New Zealand	9	(0)
Medal record
Men's football
Representing New Zealand
OFC Nations Cup
Winner	2024 Fiji/Vanuatu
- * Club domestic league appearances and goals as of 25 October 2025 ‡ National team caps and goals as of 2 July 2024

Oliver Steven Edward "Oli" Sail is a New Zealand professional footballer who plays as a goalkeeper for A-League club Auckland FC and the New Zealand national football team.

== Club career ==
=== Auckland City ===
In 2013, Sail joined Auckland City but wouldn't debut until the following year in the semi-final of the 2013–14 ASB Premiership, when he replaced Tamati Williams in Auckland City's 4–1 victory over its classic rival Waitakere United.

=== Wellington Phoenix ===
Sail joined Wellington Phoenix to be part of their new reserves team playing in the ASB Premiership.

On 3 March 2017, Sail signed his first senior contract, penning a two-year deal with Wellington Phoenix.

On 25 March 2018, Sail made his A-League debut against Brisbane Roar in a 2–2 draw.

Sail had a wait of 663 days between games before he saw another start for the Phoenix after not playing at all during the 2019-2020 season, getting the start in a 2–2 draw against Western Sydney Wanderers. He then went on to record successive clean sheets against the Newcastle Jets and Perth Glory as well as man of the match honours, helping a resurgent Phoenix claim back-to-back victories for the first time in a year.

On 3 March 2023, Sail confirmed that he would be leaving Wellington Phoenix at the end of the 2022-23 A-League season.

=== Perth Glory ===
6 days after Sail's impending departure from Wellington was made public, it was announced that Sail would join Perth Glory for the 2023-24 season as he signed a three-year contract.

On 18 August 2025, the Glory would announce Sail's departure from the club.

=== Auckland FC ===
On 18 August 2025, it was announced that Sail would join Auckland FC. Sail would feature for the Auckland FC Reserves twice during the National League campaign, keeping a clean sheet in a 3–0 win over Birkenhead United.

On 31 January 2026, Sail made his A-League debut against his former club Perth Glory in a 2–1 loss; however, his appearance was short-lived after he was stretchered off with a knee injury, which Steve Corica later confirmed was a ruptured tendon.

== International career ==
=== U-20 ===
Though Sail was picked for the New Zealand U-17 team in 2013, he didn't get on the pitch. He was then picked for the New Zealand U-20 team for the 2015 FIFA U-20 World Cup played in New Zealand, making his debut in the 0–0 draw against Ukraine. He then started again in the 4–0 loss to the United States three days later.

=== Senior ===
In 2014, Sail was called up to New Zealand's senior squad for two friendlies against China and Thailand, but he was unused in both matches.

== Career statistics ==
As of match played 31 January 2026

Club	Season	League			National Cup (Note: Includes appearances in the Chatham Cup, and Australia Cup)		Other		Total	
Club	Season	Division	Apps	Goals	Apps	Goals	Apps	Goals	Apps	Goals
Auckland City	2013–14	Premiership	1	0	0	0	—		1	0
Wellington Phoenix Reserves	2014–15	Premiership	12	0	0	0	—		12	0
Wellington Phoenix Reserves	2015–16	Premiership	11	0	0	0	—		11	0
Wellington Phoenix Reserves	2016–17	Premiership	8	0	0	0	—		8	0
Wellington Phoenix Reserves	2017–18	Premiership	10	0	0	0	—		10	0
Wellington Phoenix Reserves	2018–19	Premiership	4	0	0	0	—		4	0
Wellington Phoenix Reserves	2019–20	Premiership	6	0	0	0	—		6	0
Wellington Phoenix Reserves	Total		51	0	0	0	—		51	0
Wellington Phoenix	2017–18	A-League	4	0	0	0	—		4	0
Wellington Phoenix	2018–19	A-League	4	0	0	0	0	0	4	0
Wellington Phoenix	2020–21	A-League	19	0	0	0	—		20	0
Wellington Phoenix	2021–22	A-League Men	23	0	2	0	1 (Note: Appearances in A-League Finals)	0	26	0
Wellington Phoenix	2022–23	A-League Men	26	0	3	0	1	0	30	0
Wellington Phoenix	Total		76	0	5	0	2	0	84	0
Perth Glory	2023–24	A-League Men	17	0	1	0	—		18	0
Perth Glory	2024–25	A-League Men	20	0	3	0	—		23	0
Perth Glory	2025–26	A-League Men	—		2	0	—		2	0
Perth Glory	Total		37	0	4	0	—		43	0
Auckland FC Reserves	2025	National League	2	0	—		—		2	0
Auckland FC	2025–26	A-League Men	1	0	—		0	0	1	0
Career total			168	0	9	0	2	0	182	0

== Honours ==
New Zealand

- OFC Nations Cup: 2024

Auckland FC

- A-League Men Championship: 2026
