= Stefan Marinovic =

New Zealand footballer (born 1991)

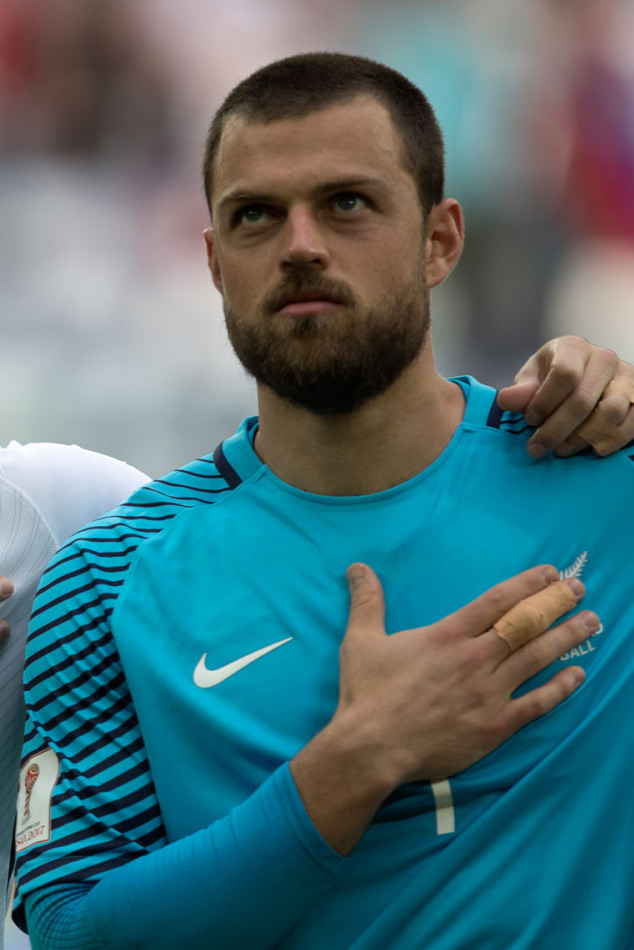
- Marinovic at the 2017 FIFA Confederations Cup

Personal information
- Full name: Stefan Tone Marinovic
- Date of birth: 7 October 1991 (age 35)
- Place of birth: Auckland, New Zealand
- Height: 1.91 m (6 ft 3 in)
- Position: Goalkeeper

Team information
- Current team: TSV Grünwald

Youth career
- Waitakere United

Senior career*
Years	Team	Apps	(Gls)
2009–2012	SV Wehen Wiesbaden II	36	(0)
2009–2012	SV Wehen Wiesbaden	2	(0)
2013	FC Ismaning	1	(0)
2013–2014	1860 Munich II	1	(0)
2014	SpVgg Unterhaching II	8	(0)
2014–2017	SpVgg Unterhaching	70	(0)
2017–2018	Vancouver Whitecaps FC	32	(0)
2019	Bristol City	1	(0)
2019–2021	Wellington Phoenix	33	(0)
2021–2022	Hapoel Nof HaGalil	28	(0)
2022–2023	Hapoel Tel Aviv	18	(0)
2024–2025	TSV Grünwald	5	(0)

International career^{‡}
2011	New Zealand U20	7	(0)
2015–2023	New Zealand	30	(0)
- * Club domestic league appearances and goals as of 28 January 2025 ‡ National team caps and goals as of 28 January 2025

Stefan Tone Marinovic (Croatian: Stefan Tone Marinović, pronounced [stêfaːn tǒːne marǐːnoʋitɕ]; born 7 October 1991) is a New Zealand former professional footballer who plays as a goalkeeper.

== Club career ==
Born in New Zealand to Croatian parents, Marinovic attended Auckland private school, Kings College. In 2005, he won the New Zealand Nike Cup. In 2008, Marinovic was selected for the New Zealand under-19 schoolboys national team for its tour of Austria. He received trials from clubs such as Everton FC, FC Zürich and FC Schalke 04, but they all failed, and so he joined Waitakere United. He reached the national final with United, but they lost 6–0 to Canterbury.

In mid-2009, he graduated from the Wynton Rufer Soccer School of Excellence, created to help talented players earn trials overseas.

Marinovic was spotted by German club, SV Wehen Wiesbaden, in the 3. Liga at that time, and he signed a professional contract with them. He was the third choice goalkeeper during the 2010–11 season, and played with the U23 team. He made his professional debut for Wiesbaden on 27 April 2010 in an away game to league leaders Erzgebirge Aue when Marc Birkenbach was injured after 30 minutes. The game finished 2–2. When Michael Gurski was signed, he again became the third choice keeper, only being used for the U23 team.

In 2013, Marinovic left Wiesbaden and joined FC Ismaning and then 1860 Munich reserves, making one appearance at each club. In 2014, Marinovic signed with German Regionalliga club SpVgg Unterhaching, playing an important role in their promotion to the 3. Liga in his final season.

On 21 July 2017, Marinovic signed with MLS side Vancouver Whitecaps FC after impressing with the national team. He was released by Vancouver at the end of their 2018 season.

On 7 March 2019, Marinovic signed for EFL Championship side Bristol City until the end of the 2018–19 season, covering for injured goalkeepers Frank Fielding and Niki Mäenpää. He was released by Bristol City at the end of the 2018–19 season.

On 6 June 2019, Marinovic signed a two-year contract with A-League club Wellington Phoenix.

== International career ==
In 2011, Marinovic made two appearances for the New Zealand U20 national team at the FIFA U20 World Cup in Colombia.

On 8 March 2015, Marinovic was called into the senior New Zealand national team to play a friendly against South Korea by coach Anthony Hudson. He made his debut in the match in Seoul on 31 March, playing the full 90 minutes, and has since established himself as the No.1 stopper for New Zealand. On his debut, he conceded a penalty kick, but saved it, eventually conceding the only goal of the game by Lee Jae-sung in the 86th minute.

== Career statistics ==
As of 1 June 2022

Appearances and goals by club, season and competition
Club	Season	League			National Cup		Other		Total	
Club	Season	Division	Apps	Goals	Apps	Goals	Apps	Goals	Apps	Goals
SV Wehen Wiesbaden	2009–10	3. Liga	2	0	0	0	0	0	2	0
SV Wehen Wiesbaden	2010–11	3. Liga	0	0	0	0	0	0	0	0
SV Wehen Wiesbaden	Total		2	0	0	0	0	0	2	0
SV Wehen Wiesbaden II	2009–10	Regionalliga Süd	15	0	0	0	0	0	15	0
SV Wehen Wiesbaden II	2010–11	Regionalliga Süd	11	0	0	0	0	0	11	0
SV Wehen Wiesbaden II	2011–12	Hessenliga	10	0	0	0	0	0	10	0
SV Wehen Wiesbaden II	Total		36	0	0	0	0	0	36	0
FC Ismaning	2012–13	Regionalliga Bayern	1	0	0	0	0	0	1	0
1860 Munich II	2013–14	Regionalliga Bayern	1	0	0	0	0	0	1	0
SpVgg Unterhaching II	2014–15	Bayernliga Süd	8	0	0	0	0	0	8	0
SpVgg Unterhaching	2014–15	3. Liga	9	0	0	0	0	0	9	0
SpVgg Unterhaching	2015–16	Regionalliga Bayern	31	0	3	0	0	0	34	0
SpVgg Unterhaching	2016–17	Regionalliga Bayern	30	0	1	0	0	0	31	0
SpVgg Unterhaching	Total		70	0	4	0	0	0	74	0
Vancouver Whitecaps FC	2017	Major League Soccer	8	0	0	0	0	0	8	0
Vancouver Whitecaps FC	2018	Major League Soccer	24	0	4	0	0	0	28	0
Vancouver Whitecaps FC	Total		32	0	4	0	0	0	36	0
Bristol City	2018–19	Championship	1	0	0	0	0	0	1	0
Wellington Phoenix	2019–20	A-League	27	0	1	0	0	0	28	0
Wellington Phoenix	2020–21	A-League	6	0	0	0	0	0	6	0
Wellington Phoenix	Total		33	0	1	0	0	0	34	0
Hapoel Nof HaGalil	2021–22	Israeli Premier League	28	0	0	0	4	0	32	0
Hapoel Tel Aviv	2022–23	Israeli Premier League	18	0	0	0	—		18	0
TSV Grünwald	2024–25	Bayernliga Süd	10	0	—		3 (Note: Two appearances in Relegation play-offs; one appearance in Bavarian Cup)	0	13	0
Career total			212	0	9	0	4	0	225	0

== Honours ==
SpVgg Unterhaching

- Regionalliga Bayern: 2016–17

New Zealand U20

- OFC U-20 Championship: 2011 OFC U-20 Championship

New Zealand

- OFC Nations Cup: 2016

Individual

- OFC Nations Cup Golden Glove: 2016
- IFFHS OFC Men's Team of the Decade 2011–2020
- IFFHS Oceania Men's Team of All Time: 2021
