= James McGarry (footballer) =

New Zealand footballer

- McGarry playing for the Wellington Phoenix in 2026.

Personal information
- Full name: James Robert McGarry
- Date of birth: 9 April 1998 (age 28)
- Place of birth: Mosgiel, New Zealand
- Height: 1.79 m (5 ft 10 in)
- Position: Left-back

Team information
- Current team: Wellington Phoenix
- Number: 23

Youth career
- Southern United

Senior career*
Years	Team	Apps	(Gls)
2014–2018	Wellington Phoenix Reserves	52	(11)
2015–2018	Wellington Phoenix	2	(0)
2018–2020	Willem II	6	(0)
2020–2022	Wellington Phoenix	38	(0)
2022–2023	Newcastle Jets	10	(1)
2023	Central Coast Mariners	14	(3)
2023–2025	Aberdeen	20	(0)
2025	→ Athens Kallithea (loan)	8	(0)
2025–2026	Brisbane Roar	24	(0)
2026–	Wellington Phoenix	0	(0)

International career^{‡}
2015	New Zealand U17	9	(4)
2017	New Zealand U20	4	(0)
2019	New Zealand U23	2	(0)
2019–	New Zealand	9	(1)
- * Club domestic league appearances and goals as of 31 March 2026 ‡ National team caps and goals as of 15 November 2026

James Robert McGarry (born 9 April 1998) is a New Zealand professional footballer who plays as a left-back for A-League Men club Wellington Phoenix FC and the New Zealand national team.

== Club career ==
McGarry playing for the Wellington Phoenix in October 2026.

McGarry was scouted to attend the APFA academy in Christchurch from Dunedin in 2011. McGarry had professional trials with Chelsea and Sheffield United. When the academy relocated to Wellington to come under the banner of the Wellington Phoenix, Academy Director Jess Ibrom recruited McGarry to be part of the Wellington Phoenix Academy.

=== Wellington Phoenix ===
On 10 September 2015, McGarry joined Wellington Phoenix together with his countryman Logan Rogerson.

On 10 May 2016, Wellington Phoenix released McGarry from his contract so he could gain game time at Wellington United during the winter. He then returned to play for the Wellington Phoenix, mainly appearing in their reserve team.

=== Willem II ===
Following the expiration of McGarry's contract at Wellington Phoenix, McGarry signed for Eredivisie club Willem II on a two-year contract, alongside fellow New Zealander Michael Woud. He was named in the starting eleven for the first game of the Eredivisie season against VVV-Venlo, playing 63 minutes before being substituted.

=== Wellington Phoenix ===
McGarry returned to Wellington Phoenix on 23 October 2020, following his departure from Willem II in May that year.

=== Newcastle Jets ===
McGarry joined Newcastle Jets on a two-year deal in July 2022. McGarry scored against his former side, Wellington Phoenix, in his first match against them. McGarry made 11 appearances across all competitions for Newcastle, before leaving the club mid-way through his first season.

=== Central Coast Mariners ===
McGarry's departure from Newcastle came via a swap deal with the Central Coast Mariners, which saw McGarry join the Mariners in exchange for Thomas Aquilina heading to Newcastle. The Mariners and Jets share a fierce rivalry, the F3 Derby, with player movement between the two clubs rare and often controversial.

McGarry scored his first goal for the Mariners against his first A-League club, Wellington Phoenix, just as he had done for Newcastle. After impressing in his first 4 appearances for the Mariners, McGarry signed a two-year contract extension to stay at the club beyond that season.

McGarry was part of the 2022–23 A-League Championship winning team for the Mariners, in his first season at the club.

=== Aberdeen ===
McGarry joined Aberdeen of the Scottish Premiership on 11 August 2023 for an undisclosed fee, on a 3-year deal. After struggling for game time, in January 2025 he joined Super League Greece side Athens Kallithea on loan.

=== Brisbane Roar ===
On 19 June 2025, it was announced that McGarry had agreed a move to A-League side Brisbane Roar.

=== Return to Wellington Phoenix ===
On 9 June 2026, Brisbane Roar announced that they had mutually agreed to terminate McGarry's contract. Later that day, he returned to Wellington Phoenix, signing a two-year contract with the club.

== International career ==
McGarry represented New Zealand at both the 2015 FIFA U-17 World Cup and the 2017 FIFA U-20 World Cup. He made his debut for New Zealand national football team on 17 November 2019 in a friendly against Lithuania.

== Personal life ==
He is the son of former New Zealand football and international player Michael McGarry. He attended St Patrick's College.

== Career statistics ==
=== Club ===
As of match played 19 May 2024

Appearances and goals by club, season and competition
Club	Season	League			National Cup		League Cup		Other		Total	
Club	Season	Division	Apps	Goals	Apps	Goals	Apps	Goals	Apps	Goals	Apps	Goals
Wellington Phoenix	2015–16	A-League	1	0	0	0	–		–		1	0
Wellington Phoenix	2016–17	A-League	1	0	0	0	–		–		1	0
Wellington Phoenix	2017–18	A-League	0	0	0	0	–		–		0	0
Wellington Phoenix	Total		2	0	0	0	0	0	0	0	2	0
Willem II	2018–19	Eredivisie	5	0	0	0	0	0	–		5	0
Willem II	2019–20	Eredivisie	1	0	0	0	0	0	–		1	0
Willem II	Total		6	0	0	0	0	0	0	0	6	0
Wellington Phoenix	2020–21	A-League	22	0	0	0	–		–		22	0
Wellington Phoenix	2021–22	A-League Men	16	0	1	0	–		–		17	0
Wellington Phoenix	Total		38	0	1	0	0	0	–		39	0
Newcastle Jets	2022–23	A-League Men	10	1	1	0	–		–		11	1
Central Coast Mariners	2022–23	A-League Men	14	3	0	0	–		–		14	3
Aberdeen	2023–24	Scottish Premiership	13	0	0	0	1	0	3	0	17	0
Aberdeen	2024–25	Scottish Premiership	7	0	0	0	4	1	0	0	11	1
Aberdeen	Total		20	0	0	0	5	1	3	0	28	1
Athens Kallithea (loan)	2024–25	Super League Greece	6	0	0	0	0	0	–		6	0
Brisbane Roar	2025–26	A-League Men	24	0	0	0	—		–		24	0
Wellington Phoenix	2026–27	A-League Men	0	0	—		—		—		0	0
Career total			107	4	1	0	2	0	3	0	113	4

== International goals ==
List of international goals scored by James McGarry
No.	Date	Venue	Opponent	Score	Result	Competition
1.	15 November 2026	One New Zealand Stadium, Christchurch, New Zealand	India	2–0	3–0	Friendly

== Honours ==
Central Coast Mariners

- A-League Men Championship: 2022–23
