= Steven Ugarkovic =

Australian footballer

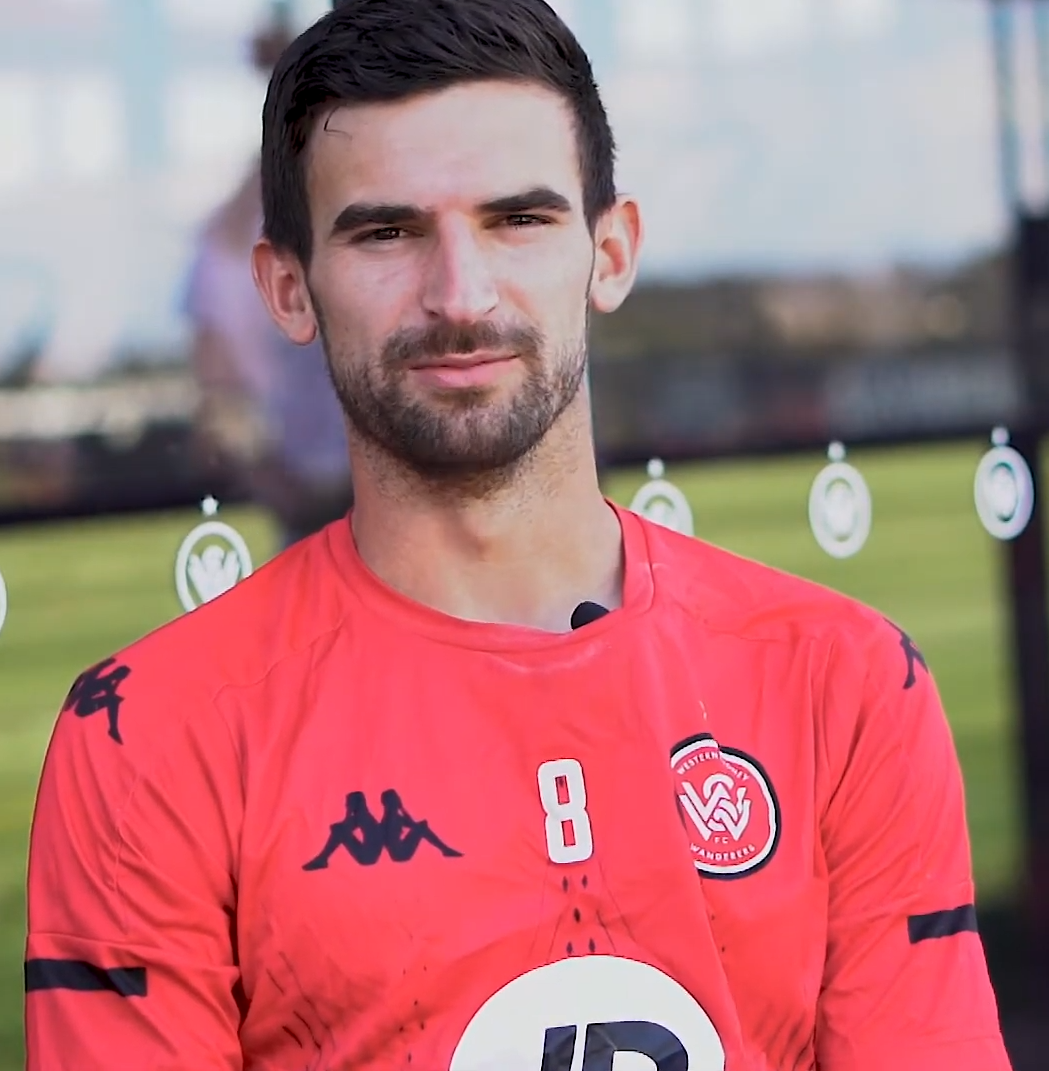
- Ugarkovic with Western Sydney Wanderers in 2021

Personal information
- Full name: Steven Peter Ugarkovic
- Date of birth: 19 August 1994 (age 32)
- Place of birth: Baulkham Hills, New South Wales, Australia
- Height: 1.80 m (5 ft 11 in)
- Position: Defensive midfielder

Team information
- Current team: Western Sydney Wanderers
- Number: 6

Youth career
- Sydney United
- Marconi Stallions
- Blacktown Spartans
- 2013: Osijek

Senior career*
Years	Team	Apps	(Gls)
2013–2016	Osijek	42	(1)
2015	→ HNK Gorica (loan)	8	(0)
2016–2021	Newcastle Jets	135	(9)
2021–2022	Western Sydney Wanderers	32	(3)
2022–2023	Wellington Phoenix	27	(1)
2023–2025	Melbourne City	51	(6)
2025–	Western Sydney Wanderers	24	(1)

International career^{‡}
2013–2014	Croatia U19	2	(0)
2014–2017	Australia U23	12	(0)
- * Club domestic league appearances and goals as of 28 April 2026 ‡ National team caps and goals as of 16 November 2015

Steven Ugarković (Croatian: [uˈɡarkɔʋitɕ]; born 19 August 1994) is an Australian soccer player who plays as a defensive midfielder for A-League club Western Sydney Wanderers.

== Career ==
=== Osijek ===
Ugarkovic started his professional career at Croatian club NK Osijek, moving from his home city of Sydney, Australia to pursue a career in football at the age of 17.

=== Newcastle Jets ===
Ugarkovic returned to Australia in the January transfer window of the 2015-16 A-League season. Ugarkovic's first appearance for the Newcastle Jets was on 31 January 2016, in a 1–0 loss to Adelaide United.

In January 2021, it was announced that Ugarkovic would play out the rest of the 2020-21 A-League season at Newcastle before joining Western Sydney Wanderers FC for the 2021-22 A-League season. Ugarkovic spent 4 1/2 seasons at Newcastle. Ugarkovic made 144 appearances for Newcastle across all competitions, scoring 9 goals.

=== Western Sydney Wanderers ===
Ugarkovic completed his transfer early in a swap deal involving Jordan O'Doherty joining Newcastle, and spent the end of the 2020-21 season as well as the 2021-22 season at Western Sydney.

Ugarkovic departed the Wanderers at the completion of his first full season at the club. Ugarkovic made 35 appearances and scored 4 goals in all competitions for the Wanderers.

=== Wellington Phoenix ===
Ugarkovic joined Wellington Phoenix ahead of the 2022-23 season.

Ugarkovic was also at the Phoenix for a single season only, in March announcing his impending departure at the end of the season. Ugarkovic made 27 appearances for Wellington, scoring one goal.

== Personal life ==
His father, John Ugarkovic, played in the NSL for Sydney United.

In June 2022, Steven Ugarkovic married Bianka Ugarkovic.

== Career statistics ==
As of match played 5 May 2024

Appearances and goals by club, season and competition
Club	Season	League			Cup		Continental		Total	
Club	Season	Division	Apps	Goals	Apps	Goals	Apps	Goals	Apps	Goals
Osijek	2013–14	Croatian First Football League	23	1	3	1	—		26	2
Osijek	2014–15	Croatian First Football League	8	0	2	0	—		10	0
Osijek	2015–16	Croatian First Football League	11	0	1	0	—		12	0
Osijek	Total		42	1	6	1	—		48	2
Gorica (loan)	2014–15	Croatian Second Football League	8	0	0	0	—		8	0
Newcastle Jets	2015–16	A-League	11	1	—		—		11	1
Newcastle Jets	2016–17	A-League	25	1	0	0	—		25	1
Newcastle Jets	2017–18	A-League	29	1	1	0	—		25	1
Newcastle Jets	2018–19	A-League	27	0	2	0	2	0	31	0
Newcastle Jets	2019–20	A-League	26	4	3	0	—		29	4
Newcastle Jets	2020–21	A-League	17	2	—		—		17	2
Newcastle Jets	Total		135	9	6	0	2	0	143	9
Western Sydney Wanderers	2020–21	A-League Men	6	0	—		—		6	0
Western Sydney Wanderers	2021–22	A-League Men	26	3	3	1	—		29	4
Western Sydney Wanderers	Total		32	3	3	1	—		35	4
Wellington Phoenix	2022–23	A-League Men	27	1	0	0	—		27	1
Melbourne City	2023–24	A-League Men	27	3	4	0	6	0	37	3
Career total			271	17	19	2	8	0	298	19
