= Alex Rufer =

New Zealand footballer (born 1996)

- Rufer playing for the Wellington Phoenix in 2026.

Personal information
- Full name: Alex Arthur Rufer
- Date of birth: 12 June 1996 (age 30)
- Place of birth: Geneva, Switzerland
- Height: 1.84 m (6 ft 0 in)
- Position: Defensive midfielder

Team information
- Current team: Wellington Phoenix
- Number: 14

Youth career
- –2013: YoungHeart Manawatu

Senior career*
Years	Team	Apps	(Gls)
2013	YoungHeart Manawatu	5	(0)
2013	Wairarapa United	1	(1)
2013–2022	Wellington Phoenix Reserves	28	(3)
2013–	Wellington Phoenix	167	(6)

International career^{‡}
2013–2014	New Zealand U17	13	(3)
2015	New Zealand U20	1	(1)
2015–2020	New Zealand U23	4	(1)
2015–	New Zealand	23	(0)
Medal record
Men's football
Representing New Zealand
OFC Nations Cup
Winner	2024 Fiji/Vanuatu
OFC U-17 Championship
Winner	2013 Samoa/Vanuatu
- * Club domestic league appearances and goals as of 29 November 2025 ‡ National team caps and goals as of 18 November2024

Alex Arthur Rufer (/ˈɹuːfə(ɹ)/; born 12 June 1996) is a New Zealand professional footballer who captains and plays as a defensive midfielder for Wellington Phoenix in the A-League. Born in Switzerland, he represents the New Zealand national team.

== Personal life ==
Rufer is the son of former international New Zealand player Shane Rufer, and the nephew of Oceania Player of the Century Wynton Rufer. He also attended Palmerston North Boys' High School.

== Club career ==
Rufer started his career with YoungHeart Manawatu.

In February 2013, Rufer joined Wairarapa United.

In August 2013, ahead of the A-League season, Rufer signed a three-year contract with Wellington Phoenix. Rufer made his debut for the Wellington Phoenix in the 3–2 away win against Newcastle Jets on 9 February 2014.

In a 2–1 loss against Brisbane Roar on 12 March 2022, Rufer suffered an anterior cruciate ligament (ACL) rupture. Rufer was sidelined from the injury until returning on 7 January 2023 in a 1–0 away win against Sydney FC.

On 22 January 2023, in his 107th match for the Phoenix, Rufer scored his first goal for the club. The goal came in a 2–1 home win against the Central Coast Mariners.

On 27 July 2026, the Phoenix renewed Rufer's contract for another two seasons, until the end of the 2027–28 season. Rufer is set to play his 14th and 15th seasons for the Wellington-based club as a result.

== International career ==
Rufer made his international debut for the All Whites in a friendly match against Myanmar on 7 September 2015, coming on for Jeremy Brockie in the 72nd minute.

On 14 May 2026, he was named in the 26-man squad for the 2026 FIFA World Cup.

== Career statistics ==
=== Club ===
As of match played on 29 April 2023

Appearances and goals by club, season and competition
Club	Season	League			Cup (Note: Appearance(s) in the Australia Cup)		Other		Total	
Club	Season	Division	Apps	Goals	Apps	Goals	Apps	Goals	Apps	Goals
YoungHeart Manawatu	2012–13	Premiership	5	0	—		—		5	0
Wellington Phoenix	2013–14	A-League	1	0	—		—		1	0
Wellington Phoenix	2014–15	A-League	3	0	0	0	—		3	0
Wellington Phoenix	2015–16	A-League	4	0	1	0	—		5	0
Wellington Phoenix	2016–17	A-League	3	0	0	0	—		3	0
Wellington Phoenix	2017–18	A-League	11	0	1	0	—		12	0
Wellington Phoenix	2018–19	A-League	24	0	1	0	1 (Note: Appearance in the A-League final series)	0	26	0
Wellington Phoenix	2019–20	A-League	19	0	1	0	1	0	21	0
Wellington Phoenix	2020–21	A-League	21	0	0	0	—		21	0
Wellington Phoenix	2021–22	A-League Men	14	0	3	0	—		17	0
Wellington Phoenix	2022–23	A-League Men	18	2	0	0	1	0	19	2
Wellington Phoenix	2023–24	A-League Men	24	3	2	0	2	0	28	3
Wellington Phoenix	2024–25	A-League Men	19	0	1 (Note: Appearance in 2025 Australia Cup)	0	—		20	0
Wellington Phoenix	2025–26	A-League Men	23	2	1	0	—		24	2
Wellington Phoenix	2026–27	A-League Men	0	0	—		—		0	0
Wellington Phoenix	Total		129	2	7	0	3	0	139	2
Wellington Phoenix Reserves	2014–15	Premiership	13	1	—		—		13	1
Wellington Phoenix Reserves	2015–16	Premiership	2	0	—		—		2	0
Wellington Phoenix Reserves	2016–17	Premiership	7	1	—		—		7	1
Wellington Phoenix Reserves	2017–18	Premiership	4	1	—		—		4	1
Wellington Phoenix Reserves	2019–20	Premiership	1	0	—		—		1	0
Wellington Phoenix Reserves	2020–21	Premiership	1	0	—		—		1	0
Wellington Phoenix Reserves	2022	National League	1	0	—		—		1	0
Wellington Phoenix Reserves	Total		29	3	0	0	0	0	29	3
Career total			163	5	7	0	3	0	173	5

== Honours ==
New Zealand

- OFC Nations Cup: 2024

Individual

- PFA A-League Team of the Season: 2023–24
