= Matthew Bozinovski =

Macedonian footballer (born 2001)

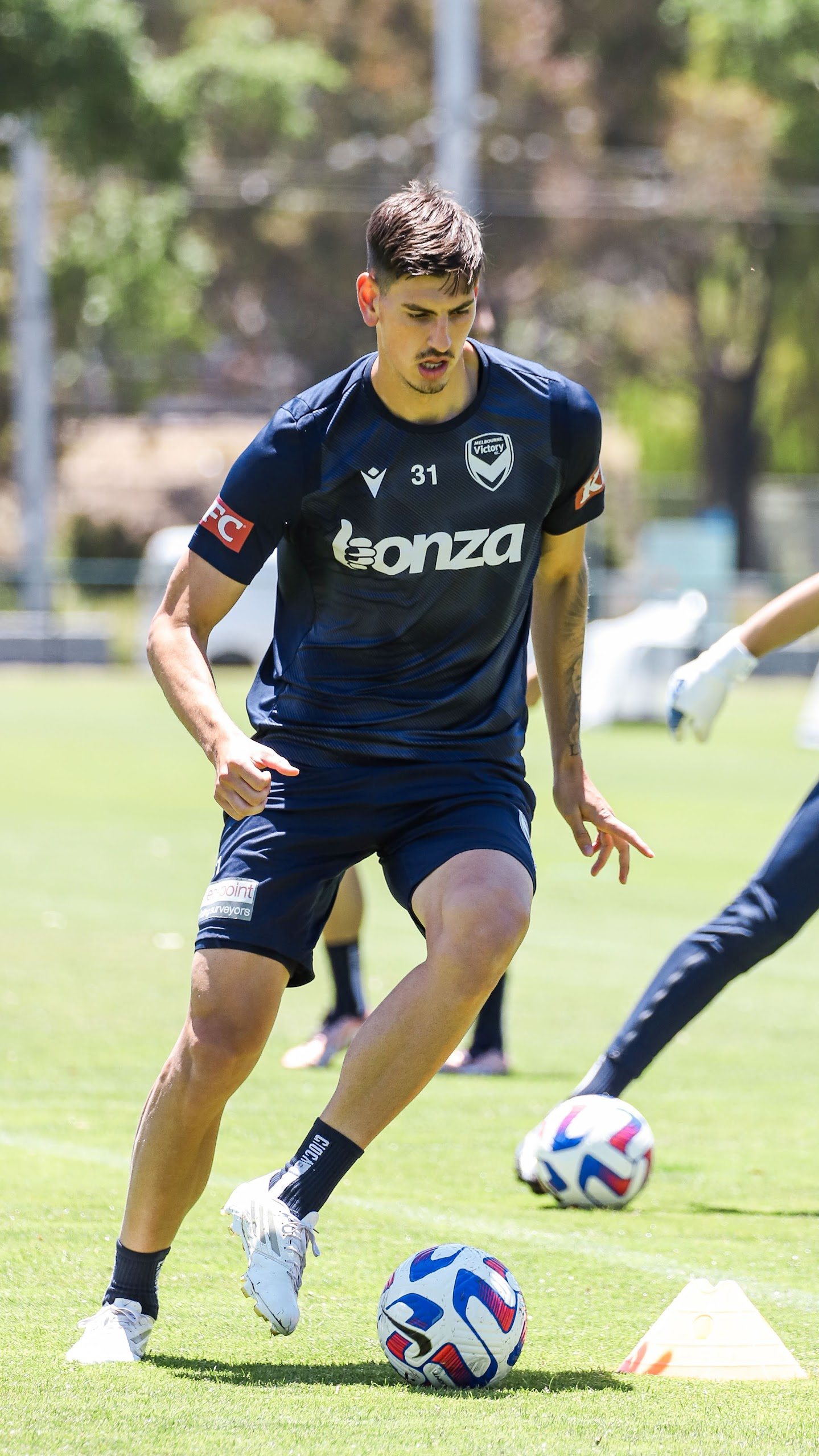
- Bozinovski in Melbourne Victory training in 2022

Personal information
- Full name: Matthew Bozinovski
- Date of birth: 5 January 2001 (age 25)
- Place of birth: Carlton, Victoria, Australia
- Height: 1.95 m (6 ft 5 in)
- Position: Centre-back

Team information
- Current team: Preston Lions
- Number: 15

Youth career
- Caroline Springs George Cross
- Hume City
- 2018–2021: Melbourne Victory

Senior career*
Years	Team	Apps	(Gls)
2017–2018	Hume City	4	(0)
2018–2024	Melbourne Victory NPL	60	(1)
2021–2024	Melbourne Victory	5	(0)
2021–2022	→ Wellington Phoenix (loan)	2	(0)
2025–	Preston Lions	39	(4)

International career^{‡}
2021	North Macedonia U-21	3	(0)
- * Club domestic league appearances and goals as of 16 August 2026 ‡ National team caps and goals as of 27 November 2021

Matthew Bozinovski (Macedonian: Метју Божиновски) (born 5 January 2001) is a professional footballer who currently played as a defender for National Premier Leagues Victoria club Preston Lions. Born in Australia, he is a youth international for North Macedonia U-21.

== Club career ==
Bozinovski start his A-League club for Melbourne Victory and Wellington Phoenix.

== Honours ==
=== Club ===
Preston Lions FC

- Dockerty Cup: 2026
