= Callan Elliot =

New Zealand association football player

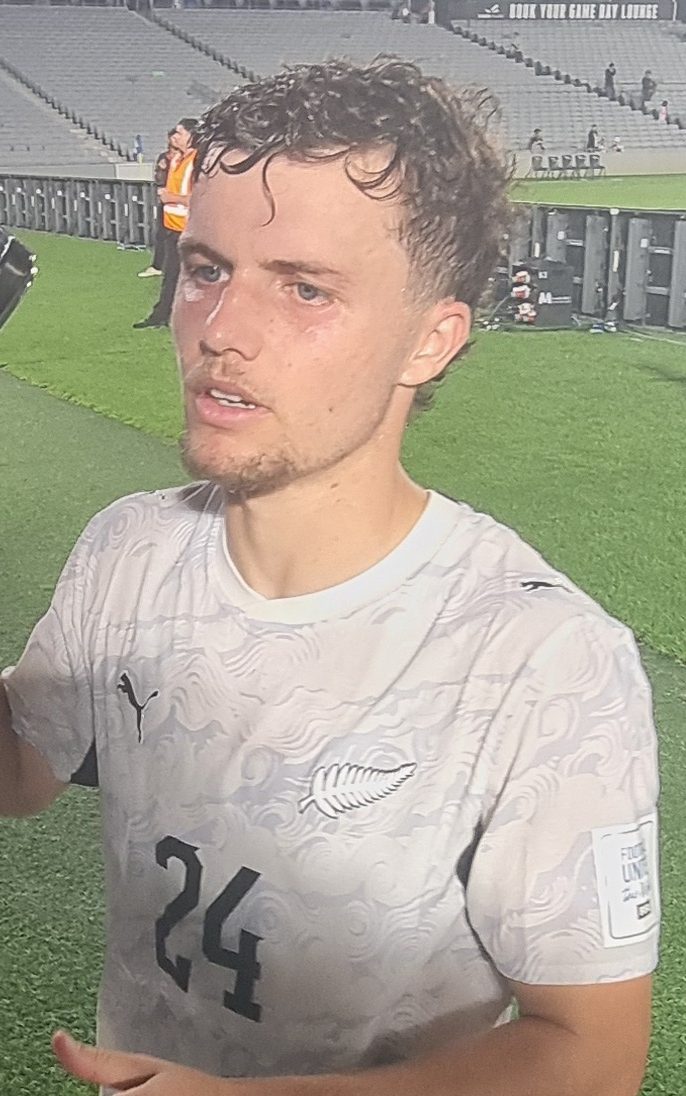
- Elliot following a match for the All Whites in March 2026.

Personal information
- Full name: Callan Rennie Elliot
- Date of birth: 7 July 1999 (age 27)
- Place of birth: Dumfries, Scotland
- Height: 1.77 m (5 ft 10 in)
- Position: Right back

Team information
- Current team: Auckland FC
- Number: 17

Senior career*
| Years | Team | Apps | (Gls) |
| 2016–2018 | Tasman United | 17 | (2) |
| 2018–2020 | Wellington Phoenix Reserves | 24 | (1) |
| 2018–2020 | Wellington Phoenix | 7 | (0) |
| 2020–2021 | Xanthi | 0 | (0) |
| 2021–2023 | Wellington Phoenix | 36 | (1) |
| 2024 | Motherwell | 0 | (0) |
| 2024– | Auckland FC | 41 | (1) |

International career^{‡}
| 2018 | New Zealand U19 | 5 | (0) |
| 2019 | New Zealand U20 | 3 | (0) |
| 2019–2021 | New Zealand U23 | 8 | (1) |
| 2023– | New Zealand | 12 | (0) |
- * Club domestic league appearances and goals as of 16 April 2026 ‡ National team caps and goals as of 16 June 2026

Callan Rennie Elliot (born 7 July 1999) is a New Zealand professional footballer who plays as a right back for A-League club Auckland FC and the New Zealand national team.

== Club career ==
Born in Scotland and emigrating to New Zealand as a young child, Elliot was educated at Nelson College and Rathkeale College. He began his career with hometown club Tasman United under the mentorship of teammate Paul Ifill, making his senior debut as a substitute against New Zealand Football Championship leaders Auckland City on 15 January 2017. Elliot became a regular starter in the 2017–18 season, where his appearances caught the attention of A-League side Wellington Phoenix.

=== Wellington Phoenix ===
Elliot signed a professional contract with Wellington Phoenix at the beginning of the following season, and made his debut as a substitute in an 8–2 win over Central Coast Mariners on 10 March 2019.

=== Xanthi ===
In September 2020, Elliot signed a three-year deal with Greek club Xanthi, coached by Australian Tony Popovic.

=== Return to Wellington Phoenix ===
In July 2021, it was announced that Elliot would rejoin Wellington Phoenix. After 2 years at the club, it was announced on the clubs Instagram that he would be leaving at the end of the 2022–23 A League season.

=== Motherwell ===
In January 2024, ten months after his departure from Wellington Phoenix, Elliot joined Scottish Premiership club Motherwell on a short-term deal until the end of the season. On 24 May 2024, Motherwell announced that Elliot had been released by the club at the end of his contract.

=== Auckland FC ===
On 2 July 2024, Auckland FC announced the signing of Elliot for their inaugural A-League Men's season. This came after two months of speculation when Scottish newspaper Daily Record reported that he was expected to leave Motherwell for Auckland FC.

Elliot scored his first goal for the club in a 2–2 draw with Central Coast Mariners at Mount Smart Stadium. Elliot made 20 appearances during the 2024–25 season in Auckland's premiership winning season. Elliot was primarily used as a backup option to Hiroki Sakai.

== International career ==
=== Senior ===
Elliot was first called up to the New Zealand squad for friendly matches against China in March 2023. Elliot made his debut on 23 March 2023 in the first match of the series, a scoreless draw.

On 14 May 2026, Elliot was named in the 26-man New Zealand squad for the 2026 FIFA World Cup.

== Career statistics ==
As of match played on 26 August 2026

Club statistics
| Club | Season | League | | | National Cup (Note: Appearance2 in the Australia Cup) | | Other | | Total | |
| Club | Season | Division | Apps | Goals | Apps | Goals | Apps | Goals | Apps | Goals |
|---|---|---|---|---|---|---|---|---|---|---|
| Tasman United | 2016–17 | NZ Premiership | 2 | 0 | 0 | 0 | — | | 2 | 0 |
| Tasman United | 2017–18 | NZ Premiership | 15 | 2 | 0 | 0 | — | | 15 | 2 |
| Tasman United | Total | | 17 | 2 | 0 | 0 | 0 | 0 | 17 | 2 |
| Wellington Phoenix Reserves | 2018–19 | NZ Premiership | 14 | 0 | 0 | 0 | — | | 14 | 0 |
| Wellington Phoenix Reserves | 2019–20 | NZ Premiership | 10 | 1 | 0 | 0 | — | | 10 | 1 |
| Wellington Phoenix Reserves | Total | | 24 | 1 | 0 | 0 | 0 | 0 | 24 | 1 |
| Wellington Phoenix | 2018–19 | A-League | 3 | 0 | 0 | 0 | 1 (Note: Appearances in A-League Finals) | 0 | 4 | 0 |
| Wellington Phoenix | 2019–20 | A-League | 4 | 0 | 1 | 0 | 1 | 0 | 6 | 0 |
| Wellington Phoenix | Total | | 7 | 0 | 1 | 0 | 2 | 0 | 10 | 0 |
| Xanthi | 2020–21 | Super League Greece 2 | 0 | 0 | 0 | 0 | — | | 0 | 0 |
| Wellington Phoenix | 2021–22 | A-League | 13 | 0 | 1 | 0 | — | | 14 | 0 |
| Wellington Phoenix | 2022–23 | A-League Men | 19 | 1 | 3 | 0 | — | | 22 | 1 |
| Wellington Phoenix | Total | | 32 | 1 | 4 | 0 | 0 | 0 | 36 | 1 |
| Motherwell | 2023–24 | Scottish Premiership | 0 | 0 | 0 | 0 | 0 | 0 | 0 | 0 |
| Auckland FC | 2024–25 | A-League Men | 18 | 1 | — | | 2 | 0 | 20 | 1 |
| Auckland FC | 2025–26 | A-League Men | 23 | 0 | 4 | 0 | 4 | 0 | 31 | 0 |
| Auckland FC | 2026–27 | A-League Men | 0 | 0 | — | | 1 (Note: Appearance in FIFA Intercontinental Cup) | 0 | 1 | 0 |
| Auckland FC | Total | | 41 | 1 | 4 | 0 | 7 | 0 | 52 | 1 |
| Career totals | | | 119 | 5 | 9 | 0 | 9 | 0 | 134 | 5 |

== Honours ==
Auckland FC

- A-League Premiership: 2024–25
- A-League Men Championship: 2026
