= Kurtis Mogg =

English footballer (born 2001)

Personal information
- Date of birth: 9 May 2001 (age 25)
- Place of birth: Worcester, England
- Position: Defender

Team information
- Current team: Perth SC
- Number: 21

Youth career
- 2010–2016: Hibiscus Coast

Senior career*
Years	Team	Apps	(Gls)
2016–2018	Hibiscus Coast		
2018–2021	Wellington Phoenix Reserves	46	(1)
2021–2022	Wellington Phoenix	0	(0)
2022–2024	Auckland United	39	(0)
2024	Western Springs	9	(1)
2025-	Perth SC	5	(0)
- * Club domestic league appearances and goals as of 26 April 2025

Kurtis Mogg (born 9 May 2001) is an English professional footballer who plays as a defender for Perth SC.

== Career ==
Mogg made his professional debut on 7 December 2021 in a FFA Cup match against A-League Men side Western United FC.
