= 2026–27 Wellington Phoenix FC season =

Wellington Phoenix
2026–27 season
- Season opening match between the Phoenix and Melbourne Victory in October 2026.
- Chairman: Rob Morrison
- Manager: Chris Greenacre
- Stadium: Hnry Stadium
- A-League Men: 1st
- Top goalscorer: League: Riley Bidois; Corban Piper (3 goals); All: Riley Bidois; Corban Piper (3 goals)
- Highest home attendance: 8,254 vs. Melbourne Victory (18 October 2026); A-League Men
- Lowest home attendance: 5,301 vs. Central Coast Mariners (25 October 2026); A-League Men
- Average home league attendance: 6,778
- Biggest win: 3–0 vs.Newcastle Jets (A) (31 October 2026); A-League Men
- Biggest defeat: 1–2 vs.Macarthur FC (H) (22 November 2026); A-League Men
Home colours	Away colours	Third colours
- All statistics correct as of 22 November 2026.

The 2026–27 season is Wellington Phoenix Football Club's 20th season in the A-League Men. The regular season began on 18 October 2026 and the last match is set for 7 May 2027.

In April 2026, Chris Greenacre was promoted from interim head coach to fulltime head coach, with the Phoenix appointing him for the 2026–27 season.

In January 2026, it was confirmed that the Wellington Phoenix and Auckland FC would no longer be participants in the Australia Cup, as New Zealand-based teams were omitted from the 2026 edition. This marks the first time since the 2013–14 season in which the Phoenix do not play in a cup competition.

== Players ==
Note: Flags indicate national team as defined under FIFA eligibility rules; some limited exceptions apply. Players may hold more than one non-FIFA nationality.

No.	Pos.	Nation	Player
5	DF	AUS	Walter Scott
6	MF	NZL	Fin Roa Conchie
7	MF	USA	Bryce Duke
8	MF	SCO	Max Anderson
9	FW	MEX	Rafael Durán
11	FW	NZL	Riley Bidois (on loan from Monterey Bay)
13	GK	NZL	Henry Gray (on loan from Ipswich Town)
14	MF	NZL	Alex Rufer (captain)
15	DF	NZL	Isaac Hughes
17	FW	NZL	Nathan Walker
18	DF	NZL	Lukas Kelly-Heald
23	DF	NZL	James McGarry

No.	Pos.	Nation	Player
24	DF	NZL	Xuan Loke
25	MF	JPN	Kazuki Nagasawa
27	DF	NZL	Matthew Sheridan
28	DF	NZL	Bill Tuiloma
30	GK	NZL	Alby Kelly-Heald
32	MF	NZL	Ben Trenberth (scholarship)
34	DF	NZL	Dylan Gardiner (scholarship)
35	MF	NZL	Luke Mitchell (scholarship)
37	MF	NZL	Anaru Cassidy (scholarship)
39	DF	NZL	Jayden Smith
40	GK	NZL	Eamonn McCarron
99	FW	NZL	Corban Piper

== Transfers ==
=== Transfers in ===
No.	Pos.	Player	Transferred from	Type/fee	Contract length	Date	Ref.
23	DF	James McGarry	Brisbane Roar	Free transfer	2 years	1 July 2026	
13	GK	Henry Gray	(England) Ipswich Town	Loan	1 year	17 July 2026	
9	FW	(Mexico) Rafael Durán	Unattached	Free transfer	2 years	18 August 2026	
11	FW	Riley Bidois	(United States) Monterey Bay	Loan	1 year	1 September 2026	
8	MF	(Scotland) Max Anderson	Unattached	Free transfer	2 years	14 September 2026	
5	DF	(Australia) Walter Scott	Unattached	Free transfer	1 year	16 September 2026	
7	MF	(United States) Bryce Duke	(United States) San Diego FC	Undisclosed	1 year (Note: Option for an additional year)	16 September 2026	

==== From youth squad ====
N	Pos.	Nat.	Name	Age	Notes
40	GK	(New Zealand)	Eamonn McCarron	18	3-year contract
32	MF	(New Zealand)	Ben Trenberth	16	3-year contract, first two of which are on scholarship terms
34	DF	(New Zealand)	Dylan Gardiner	20	1-year scholarship contract
35	MF	(New Zealand)	Luke Mitchell	20	3-year contract, first two of which are on scholarship terms

=== Transfers out ===
No.	Pos.	Player	Transferred to	Type/fee	Date	Ref.
6	DF	Tim Payne	(Paraguay) Club Olimpia	Undisclosed	19 June 2026	
1	GK	(Nigeria) Josh Oluwayemi	Unattached	End of contract	30 June 2026	
4	DF	(Canada) Manjrekar James	Unattached	End of contract	30 June 2026	
7	FW	(Nigeria) Ifeanyi Eze	Unattached	End of contract	30 June 2026	
8	MF	(Australia) Paulo Retre	(Australia) South Melbourne	End of contract	30 June 2026	
9	MF	Sarpreet Singh	(Serbia) TSC	End of loan	30 June 2026	
10	FW	(Australia) Nikola Mileusnic	Unattached	End of contract	30 June 2026	
11	DF	(Australia) Carlo Armiento	Unattached	End of contract	30 June 2026	
12	DF	Daniel Edwards	Unattached	End of contract	30 June 2026	
16	MF	(Norway) Sander Kartum	(Scotland) Heart of Midlothian	End of loan	30 June 2026	
20	MF	(Lebanon) Ramy Najjarine	(Egypt) El Qanah	End of contract	30 June 2026	
23	FW	Luke Supyk	Unattached	End of contract	30 June 2026	
17	FW	Gabriel Sloane-Rodrigues	Unattached	Mutual contract termination	3 July 2026	
29	FW	Luke Brooke-Smith	(England) Portsmouth	Undisclosed	28 July 2026	

=== Contract extensions ===
No.	Player	Pos.	Duration	Date	Notes	Ref.
25	(Japan) Kazuki Nagasawa	MF	1 year	27 May 2026		
5	Fin Roa Conchie	MF	1 year	18 June 2026		
14	Alex Rufer	MF	2 years	27 July 2026		

== Pre-season and friendlies ==
On 15 August 2026, the Wellington Phoenix announced they had played a friendly against Central League team Wellington Olympic, with the Phoenix winning the match 6–2. On 27 August, the Phoenix announced a second preseason match against Olympic, set for 5 September, with this friendly being free entry, which would ultimately end in a 0–0 draw. The Nix would pick up a 6–2 win over Northern League champions Birkenhead United in a behind closed door friendly the following weekend, before suffering four consecutive defeats against A-League opposition in Western Sydney Wanderers, Central Coast Mariners, Newcastle Jets and Macarthur FC.

Win Draw Loss

15 August 2026	Wellington Phoenix	6–2	Wellington Olympic	Upper Hutt, New Zealand
15:00 NZST	Mitchell; Nagasawa; Piper; Sheridan; Tuiloma; ? (o.g.)	Report	?; ?	Stadium: New Zealand Campus of Innovation and Sport; Attendance: 0 (behind closed doors)

5 September 2026	Wellington Phoenix	0–0	Wellington Olympic	Upper Hutt, New Zealand
13:00 NZST		Report		Stadium: New Zealand Campus of Innovation and Sport

12 September 2026	Wellington Phoenix	6–2	Birkenhead United	Upper Hutt, New Zealand
		Report		Stadium: New Zealand Campus of Innovation and Sport; Attendance: 0 (behind closed doors)

16 September 2026	Western Sydney Wanderers	4–0	Wellington Phoenix	Sydney, Australia
	Waraga; Gillion; Di Pizio; Ibusuki	Report		Stadium: Wanderers Football Park; Attendance: 0 (behind closed doors)

19 September 2026	Central Coast Mariners	5–1	Wellington Phoenix	Sydney, Australia
		Report		Stadium: TBC

1 October 2026	Newcastle Jets	5–3	Wellington Phoenix	Sydney, Australia
	Debono; Gonzalez; Morris	Report	Walker; Nagasawa	Stadium: TBC

10 October 2026	Macarthur FC	2–0	Wellington Phoenix	Sydney, Australia
		Report		Stadium: TBC

== Competitions ==
=== Overall record ===
Competition	First match	Last match	Starting round	Final position	Record							
Competition	First match	Last match	Starting round	Final position	Pld	W	D	L	GF	GA	GD	Win %
A-League Men	18 October 2026	7 May 2027	Matchday 1	TBD	5	3	1	1	8	3	+5	60.00
Total					5	3	1	1	8	3	+5	60.00

Last updated: As of 22 November 2026.
Source: Competitions

=== A-League Men ===
==== League table ====
Pos	Team	Pld	W	D	L	GF	GA	GD	Pts	Qualification
1	Wellington Phoenix (Note: Auckland FC and Wellington Phoenix cannot qualify for Asian Football Confederation competitions as they are based in New Zealand, which is part of the Oceania Football Confederation.)	5	3	1	1	8	3	+5	10	Qualification for the finals series (Note: The top two teams enter the finals series at the semi-finals, while the teams ranked third to sixth enter the finals series at the elimination-finals.)
2	Western Sydney Wanderers	5	2	2	1	10	6	+4	8	Qualification for the AFC Champions League Elite league stage and the finals series
3	Sydney FC	5	2	2	1	7	4	+3	8	Qualification for the AFC Champions League Elite preliminary stage and the finals series
4	Brisbane Roar	4	2	2	0	5	3	+2	8	Qualification for the finals series
5	Macarthur FC	5	2	2	1	6	5	+1	8	Qualification for the finals series

Updated to match(es) played on 22 November 2026. Source: A-Leagues
Rules for classification: 1) points; 2) goal difference; 3) goals scored; 4) wins; 5) head-to-head results; 5a) head-to-head points; 5b) head-to-head goal difference; 6) Fair Play points; 7) away goal difference; 8) away goals per match; 9) home goal difference; 10) home goals per match; 11) toss of a coin in an event of a tie of two clubs.

==== Results summary ====
As of 22 November 2026.

Overall								Home						Away					
Pld	W	D	L	GF	GA	GD	Pts	W	D	L	GF	GA	GD	W	D	L	GF	GA	GD
5	3	1	1	8	3	+5	10	2	0	1	5	3	+2	1	1	0	3	0	+3

==== Results by round ====
Round	1	2	3	4	5	6	7	8	9	10	11	12	13	14	15	16	17	18	19	20	21	22	23	24	25	26	27	28
Ground	H	H	A	A	H	H	B	A	H	A	H	A	A	A	H	H	A	B	A	H	A	H	A	H	H	H	A	A
Result	W	W	W	D	L		B											B										
Position	2	1	1	1	1																							
Points	3	6	9	10	10																							

Updated to match(es) played on 22 November 2026. Source: A-League Men – Standings.
A = Away; H = Home; B = Bye; W = Win; D = Draw; L = Loss

==== Matches ====
The A-League Men fixtures for the season were released on 16 July 2026. The Waitangi Day home match against Western Sydney Wanderers is set to be played at Te Kaha in Christchurch, with the match being a double header with the Wellington Phoenix Women playing first, also against the Wanderers. It is the third consecutive season the Phoenix have played in the South Island city.

Win Draw Loss Fixtures

18 October 2026 1	Wellington Phoenix	2–1	Melbourne Victory	Wellington
15:00 NZDT	Piper 14'; Bidois 77'	Report	Nduka 24'	Stadium: Hnry Stadium; Attendance: 8,254; Referee: Lachlan Keevers

25 October 2026 2	Wellington Phoenix	2–0	Central Coast Mariners	Wellington
15:00 NZDT	Durán 55'; Piper 57'	Report		Stadium: Hnry Stadium; Attendance: 5,301; Referee: Sam Kelly

31 October 2026 3	Newcastle Jets	0–3	Wellington Phoenix	Newcastle
15:00 AEDT (17:00 NZDT)	Piper 14'; Bidois 87'; Walker 90+3'	Report		Stadium: McDonald Jones Stadium; Attendance: 4,558; Referee: Eric Saba

7 November 2026 4	Auckland FC	0–0	Wellington Phoenix	Auckland
17:00 NZDT		Report		Stadium: Go Media Stadium; Attendance: 18,477; Referee: Alex King

22 November 2026 5	Wellington Phoenix	1–2	Macarthur FC	Wellington
17:00 NZDT	Bidois 88'	Report	Stamatelopoulos 6'; Bosnjak 19'	Stadium: Hnry Stadium; Referee: Alireza Faghani

6 December 2026 6	Wellington Phoenix	v	Adelaide United	Wellington
15:00 NZDT		Report		Stadium: Hnry Stadium
Note: Originally scheduled for 29 November 2026.

13 December 2026 8	Western Sydney Wanderers	v	Wellington Phoenix	Sydney
17:00 AEDT (19:00 NZDT)		Report		Stadium: CommBank Stadium

19 December 2026 9	Wellington Phoenix	v	Auckland FC	Wellington
17:00 NZDT		Report		Stadium: Hnry Stadium

29 December 2026 10	Melbourne Victory	v	Wellington Phoenix	Melbourne
19:00 AEDT (21:00 NZDT)		Report		Stadium: AAMI Park

2 January 2027 11	Wellington Phoenix	v	Newcastle Jets	Wellington
17:00 NZDT		Report		Stadium: Hnry Stadium

10 January 2027 12	Melbourne City	v	Wellington Phoenix	Melbourne
17:00 AEDT (19:00 NZDT)		Report		Stadium: AAMI Park

14 January 2027 13	Macarthur FC	v	Wellington Phoenix	Sydney
19:40 AEDT (21:40 NZDT)		Report		Stadium: Campbelltown Sports Stadium

23 January 2027 14	Brisbane Roar	v	Wellington Phoenix	Brisbane
16:00 AEST (19:00 NZDT)		Report		Stadium: Kayo Stadium

30 January 2027 15	Wellington Phoenix	v	Perth Glory	Wellington
17:00 NZDT		Report		Stadium: Hnry Stadium

6 February 2027 16	Wellington Phoenix	v	Western Sydney Wanderers	Christchurch
17:00 NZDT		Report		Stadium: One New Zealand Stadium

13 February 2027 17	Auckland FC	v	Wellington Phoenix	Auckland
17:00 NZDT		Report		Stadium: Go Media Stadium

28 February 2027 19	Melbourne City	v	Wellington Phoenix	Melbourne
16:00 AEDT (18:00 NZDT)		Report		Stadium: AAMI Park

6 March 2027 20	Wellington Phoenix	v	Sydney FC	Wellington
15:00 NZDT		Report		Stadium: Hnry Stadium

13 March 2027 21	Central Coast Mariners	v	Wellington Phoenix	Gosford
17:00 AEDT (19:00 NZDT)		Report		Stadium: polytec Stadium

20 March 2027 22	Wellington Phoenix	v	Macarthur FC	Wellington
17:00 NZDT		Report		Stadium: Wellington Stadium

2 April 2027 23	Adelaide United	v	Wellington Phoenix	Adelaide
19:10 ACDT (21:40 NZDT)		Report		Stadium: Coopers Stadium

9 April 2027 24	Wellington Phoenix	v	Brisbane Roar	Wellington
19:00 NZST		Report		Stadium: Hnry Stadium

17 April 2027 25	Wellington Phoenix	v	Newcastle Jets	Wellington
17:00 NZST		Report		Stadium: Hnry Stadium

24 April 2027 26	Wellington Phoenix	v	Melbourne City	Wellington
17:00 NZST		Report		Stadium: Hnry Stadium

30 April 2027 27	Perth Glory	v	Wellington Phoenix	Perth
19:45 AWST (23:45 NZST)		Report		Stadium: HBF Park

7 May 2027 28	Sydney FC	v	Wellington Phoenix	Sydney
19:40 AEST (21:40 NZST)		Report		Stadium: Allianz Stadium

== Statistics ==
=== Appearances and goals ===
Includes all competitions. Players with no appearances not included in the list.

As of 22 November 2026.

No.	Pos.	Nat.	Player	A-League Men		Total	
No.	Pos.	Nat.	Player	Apps	Goals	Apps	Goals
5	DF	(Australia)	Walter Scott	0+1	0	1	0
7	MF	(United States)	Bryce Duke	5	0	5	0
8	MF	(Scotland)	Max Anderson	5	0	5	0
9	FW	(Mexico)	Rafael Durán	5	1	5	1
11	FW	(New Zealand)	Riley Bidois	0+5	3	5	3
13	GK	(New Zealand)	Henry Gray	5	0	5	0
14	MF	(New Zealand)	Alex Rufer	4	0	4	0
17	FW	(New Zealand)	Nathan Walker	0+4	1	4	1
18	DF	(New Zealand)	Lukas Kelly-Heald	5	0	5	0
23	DF	(New Zealand)	James McGarry	5	0	5	0
25	MF	(Japan)	Kazuki Nagasawa	5	0	5	0
27	DF	(New Zealand)	Matthew Sheridan	5	0	5	0
28	DF	(New Zealand)	Bill Tuiloma	5	0	5	0
35	MF	(New Zealand)	Luke Mitchell	1+3	0	4	0
99	FW	(New Zealand)	Corban Piper	5	3	5	3

=== Disciplinary record ===
Includes all competitions. The list is sorted by squad number when total cards are equal. Players with no cards not included in the list.

As of 22 November 2026.

Rank	No.	Pos.	Nat.	Name	A-League Men			Total		
Rank	No.	Pos.	Nat.	Name	Yellow card	(yellow card) (yellow-red card)	Red card	Yellow card	(yellow card) (yellow-red card)	Red card
1	14	MF	(New Zealand)	Alex Rufer	2	0	0	2	0	0
2	99	FW	(New Zealand)	Corban Piper	1	0	0	1	0	0
Total					3	0	0	3	0	0

=== Clean sheets ===
Includes all competitions. The list is sorted by squad number when total clean sheets are equal. Numbers in parentheses represent games where both goalkeepers participated and both kept a clean sheet; the number in parentheses is awarded to the goalkeeper who was substituted on, whilst a full clean sheet is awarded to the goalkeeper who was on the field at the start of play. Goalkeepers with no clean sheets not included in the list.

As of 22 November 2026

Rank	No.	Nat.	Goalkeeper	A-League Men	Total
1	13	(New Zealand)	Henry Gray	3	3
Total				3	3

== See also ==
- List of Wellington Phoenix FC seasons
- 2026–27 Wellington Phoenix FC (women) season
