= 2024–25 Wellington Phoenix FC season =

Wellington Phoenix
2024–25 season
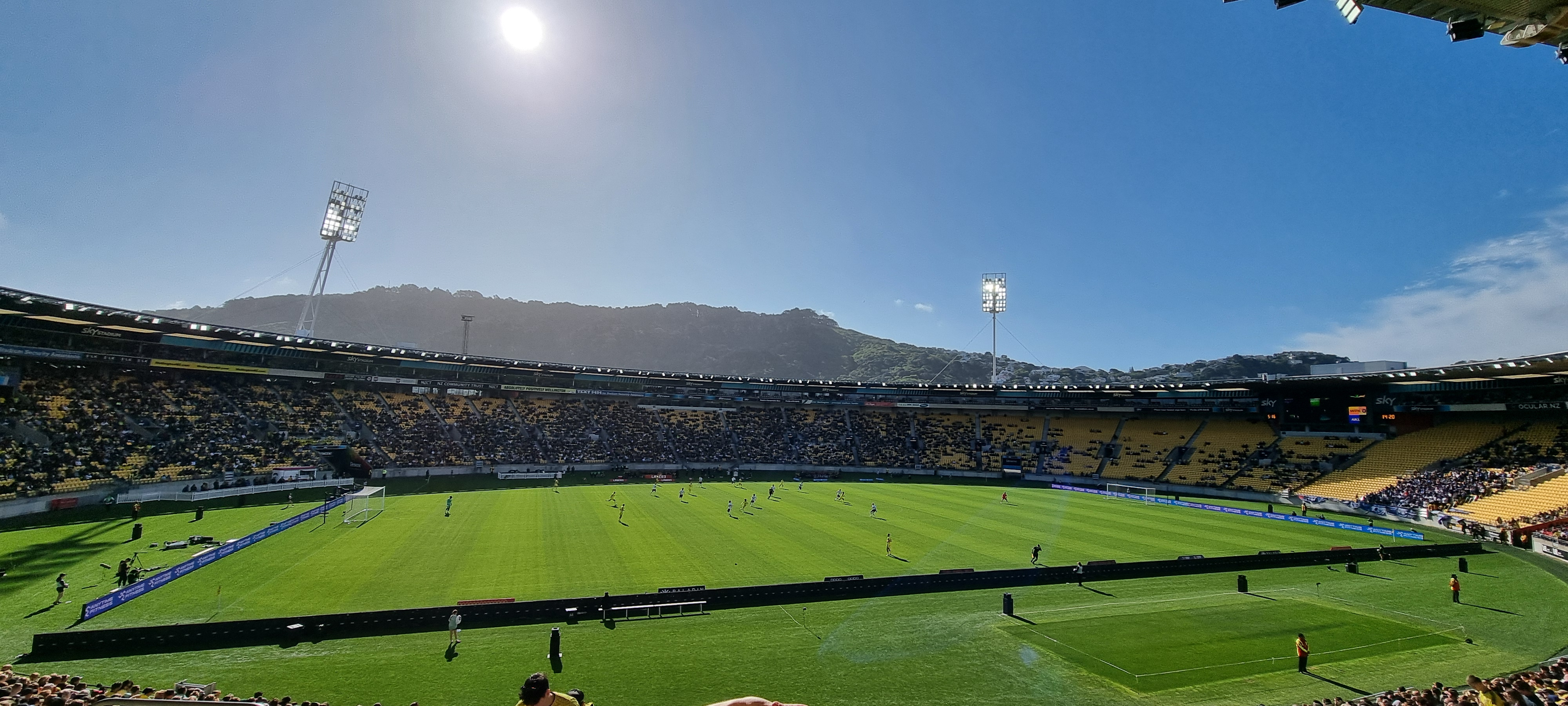
- Wellington Phoenix playing Auckland FC at home in the first Kiwi Clásico on 2 November 2024.
- Chairman: Rob Morrison
- Manager: Giancarlo Italiano
- Stadium: Sky Stadium
- A-League Men: 11th
- A-League Men finals series: DNQ
- 2024 Australia Cup: Round of 32
- 2025 Australia Cup preliminary rounds: Qualified for Round of 32
- Top goalscorer: League: Kosta Barbarouses (10); All: Kosta Barbarouses (11)
- Highest home attendance: 26,252 vs. Auckland FC (2 November 2024); A-League Men
- Lowest home attendance: 4,190 vs. Perth Glory (4 May 2025); A-League Men
- Average home league attendance: 8,366
- Biggest win: 3–0 vs. Central Coast Mariners (A) (10 November 2024); A-League Men
- Biggest defeat: 6–1 vs. Auckland FC (A) (22 February 2025); A-League Men
| Home colours | Away colours |
- All statistics correct as of end of season.

The 2024–25 season was Wellington Phoenix Football Club's 18th season in the A-League Men. In addition to the domestic league, the club participated in this season's edition of the Australia Cup.

== Players ==
Note: Flags indicate national team as defined under FIFA eligibility rules; some limited exceptions apply. Players may hold more than one non-FIFA nationality.

| No. | Pos. | Nation | Player |
|---|---|---|---|
| 1 | GK | ENG | Josh Oluwayemi |
| 3 | DF | NZL | Corban Piper (scholarship) |
| 4 | DF | ENG | Scott Wootton |
| 5 | MF | NZL | Fin Roa Conchie |
| 6 | DF | NZL | Tim Payne |
| 7 | FW | NZL | Kosta Barbarouses |
| 8 | MF | AUS | Paulo Retre |
| 9 | FW | JPN | Hideki Ishige |
| 11 | FW | MKD | Stefan Colakovski |
| 12 | MF | POR | Francisco Geraldes (on loan from Johor Darul Ta'zim) |
| 14 | MF | NZL | Alex Rufer (captain) |
| 15 | DF | NZL | Isaac Hughes |

| No. | Pos. | Nation | Player |
|---|---|---|---|
| 17 | FW | NZL | Gabriel Sloane-Rodrigues (scholarship) |
| 18 | DF | NZL | Lukas Kelly-Heald |
| 19 | DF | NZL | Sam Sutton |
| 23 | FW | NZL | Luke Supyk (scholarship) |
| 25 | MF | JPN | Kazuki Nagasawa |
| 27 | DF | NZL | Matthew Sheridan |
| 29 | FW | NZL | Luke Brooke-Smith (scholarship) |
| 30 | GK | NZL | Alby Kelly-Heald |
| 35 | GK | NZL | Dublin Boon (scholarship) |
| 36 | DF | NZL | Xuan Loke (scholarship) |
| 39 | DF | NZL | Jayden Smith (scholarship) |
| 41 | FW | NZL | Nathan Walker (scholarship) |

=== Other players with first-team appearances ===
Note: Flags indicate national team as defined under FIFA eligibility rules; some limited exceptions apply. Players may hold more than one non-FIFA nationality.

| No. / Pos. / Nation / Player; 42 / FW / NZL / Fergus Gillion | No. / Pos. / Nation / Player; 46 / MF / NZL / Lachlan Candy |

== Transfers ==
=== Transfers in ===
| No. | Position | Player | Transferred from | Type/fee | Contract length | Date | Ref. |
|---|---|---|---|---|---|---|---|
| 21 | FW | Marco Rojas | Brisbane Roar | Free transfer | 1 year | 9 July 2024 | |
| 8 | MF | (Australia) Paulo Retre | (India) Goa | Free transfer | 2 years | 26 July 2024 | |
| 29 | FW | Luke Brooke-Smith | (New Zealand) Hamilton Wanderers | Free transfer | 3 years, first two of which are on scholarship terms. | 13 August 2024 | |
| 1 | GK | (England) Josh Oluwayemi | (Finland) Lahti | Free transfer | 1 year | 15 August 2024 | |
| 25 | MF | (Japan) Kazuki Nagasawa | (Japan) Vegalta Sendai | Free transfer | 2 years | 29 August 2024 | |
| 9 | FW | (Japan) Hideki Ishige | (Japan) Gamba Osaka | Free transfer | 2 years | 2 September 2024 | |
| 3 | MF | Corban Piper | (New Zealand) Birkenhead United | Free transfer | 1 year scholarship | 16 September 2024 | |
| 11 | FW | (North Macedonia) Stefan Colakovski | Unattached | Free transfer | 1 year | 10 October 2024 | |
| 12 | MF | (Portugal) Francisco Geraldes | (Malaysia) Johor Darul Ta'zim | Loan | 5 months | 12 February 2025 | |

=== Transfers out ===
| No. | Position | Player | Transferred to | Type/fee | Date | Ref. |
|---|---|---|---|---|---|---|
| 9 | FW | (Poland) Oskar Zawada | Unattached | End of contract | 18 May 2024 | |
| 40 | GK | Alex Paulsen | (England) Bournemouth | Undisclosed | 4 June 2024 | |
| 17 | MF | (Costa Rica) Youstin Salas | (Costa Rica) Deportivo Saprissa | End of loan | 5 June 2024 | |
| 15 | MF | (Australia) Nicholas Pennington | Perth Glory | End of contract | 19 June 2024 | |
| 25 | GK | (Australia) Jack Duncan | Melbourne Victory | End of contract | 8 July 2024 | |
| 8 | MF | Ben Old | (France) Saint-Étienne | Undisclosed | 10 July 2024 | |
| 11 | MF | (Bulgaria) Bozhidar Kraev | Western Sydney Wanderers | End of contract | 16 July 2024 | |
| 3 | DF | Finn Surman | (United States) Portland Timbers | Undisclosed | 20 July 2024 | |
| 24 | FW | Oskar van Hattum | (Republic of Ireland) Sligo Rovers | Mutual contract termination | 11 January 2025 | |
| 10 | FW | (England) David Ball | Unattached | Mutual contract termination | 13 January 2025 | |
| 12 | MF | (Iraq) Mohamed Al-Taay | Western Sydney Wanderers | Mutual contract termination | 17 January 2025 | |
| 21 | FW | Marco Rojas | Unattached | Mutual contract termination | 31 March 2024 | |

=== From youth squad ===
| N | Pos. | Nat. | Name | Age | Notes |
|---|---|---|---|---|---|
| 35 | GK | (New Zealand) | Dublin Boon | 19 | 1-year scholarship contract |
| 39 | DF | (New Zealand) | Jayden Smith | 17 | 3-year contract, first two of which are on scholarship terms |
| 41 | FW | (New Zealand) | Nathan Walker | 18 | 4-year contract, first two of which are on scholarship terms |
| 36 | DF | (New Zealand) | Xuan Loke | 18 | 2.5-year contract, the first 1.5 years of which are on scholarship terms |

=== Contract extensions ===
| No. | Player | Position | Duration | Date | Notes | Ref. |
|---|---|---|---|---|---|---|
| 7 | Kosta Barbarouses | Winger | 1 year (Note: Option for an additional year.) | 23 May 2024 | | |
| 27 | Matthew Sheridan | Right-back | 3 years | 9 September 2024 | Contract extended from end of 2024–25 to end of 2027–28 and upgraded to full-pro | |
| 30 | Alby Kelly-Heald | Goalkeeper | 3 years | 9 September 2024 | New 3-year contract, replacing previous scholarship contract which was until end of 2026–27 | |
| 15 | Isaac Hughes | Centre-back | 3 years | 20 September 2024 | Contract extended from end of 2024–25 to end of 2027–28 | |
| 1 | (England) Josh Oluwayemi | Goalkeeper | 1 year | 30 October 2024 | Contract extended from end of 2024–25 to end of 2025–26 | |
| 6 | Tim Payne | Full-back | 3 years | 17 December 2024 | Contract extended from end of 2024–25 to end of 2027–28 | |
| — | (Australia) Giancarlo Italiano | Coach | 1 year | 24 April 2025 | Option for a second year | |
| 3 | Corban Piper | Centre-back | 2 years | 28 April 2025 | Contract extended from end of 2024–25 to end of 2026–27 and upgraded to full-pro | |

== Pre-season and friendlies ==
| 18 August 2024 | Wellington Phoenix (New Zealand) | 4–1 | (New Zealand) Miramar Rangers | Wellington, New Zealand |
| | Barbarouses (?); Walker (?); Al-Taay (?); Sloane-Rodrigues (?) | Report | ? (?) | Stadium: Martin Luckie Park; Attendance: 0 (behind closed doors) |

| 24 August 2024 | Wellington Phoenix (New Zealand) | 5–1 | (New Zealand) Western Suburbs | Wellington, New Zealand |
| | Retre (?); Sloane-Rodrigues (?); Barbarouses (?); Walker (?); Supyk (?) | Report | ? (?) | Stadium: Martin Luckie Park; Attendance: 0 (behind closed doors) |

| 17 September 2024 | Newcastle Jets (Australia) | 1–0 | (New Zealand) Wellington Phoenix | Sydney, Australia |
| | Gibson 60' | Report | | Attendance: 0 (behind closed doors) |

| 22 September 2024 | Wellington Phoenix (New Zealand) | 2–0 | (New Zealand) Wellington Olympic | Wellington, New Zealand |
| 14:00 NZST | van Hattum 8'; Supyk 67' | Report | | Stadium: Martin Luckie Park |

| 28 September 2024 | Western Sydney Wanderers (Australia) | 2–0 | (New Zealand) Wellington Phoenix | Sydney, Australia |
| | | Report | | Attendance: 0 (behind closed doors) |

| 6 October 2024 | Central Coast Mariners (Australia) | 1–0 | (New Zealand) Wellington Phoenix | Gosford, Australia |
| | Eames | Report | | Attendance: 0 (behind closed doors) |

== Competitions ==
=== Overall record ===
| Competition | First match | Last match | Starting round | Final position | Record | | | | | | | |
| Competition | First match | Last match | Starting round | Final position | Pld | W | D | L | GF | GA | GD | Win % |
|---|---|---|---|---|---|---|---|---|---|---|---|---|
| A-League Men | 20 October 2024 | 2 May 2025 | Matchday 1 | 11th | 26 | 6 | 6 | 14 | 27 | 43 | −16 | 23.08 |
| 2024 Australia Cup | 6 August 2024 | | Round of 32 | Round of 32 | 1 | 0 | 0 | 1 | 0 | 1 | −1 | 0.00 |
| 2025 Australia Cup play-off | 14 May 2025 | | Play-offs | Qualified for Round of 32 | 1 | 1 | 0 | 0 | 1 | 0 | +1 | 100.00 |
| Total | | | | | 28 | 7 | 6 | 15 | 28 | 44 | −16 | 25.00 |

Last updated: 14 May 2025
Source: Competitions

=== A-League Men ===
==== League table ====
| Pos | Team | Pld | W | D | L | GF | GA | GD | Pts | Qualification |
|---|---|---|---|---|---|---|---|---|---|---|
| 9 | Newcastle Jets | 26 | 8 | 6 | 12 | 43 | 44 | −1 | 30 | |
| 10 | Central Coast Mariners | 26 | 5 | 11 | 10 | 29 | 51 | −22 | 26 | Qualification for 2025 Australia Cup play-offs |
| 11 | Wellington Phoenix (Note: Auckland FC and Wellington Phoenix cannot qualify for Asian Football Confederation competitions as they are based in New Zealand, which is part of the Oceania Football Confederation.) | 26 | 6 | 6 | 14 | 27 | 43 | −16 | 24 | Qualification for 2025 Australia Cup play-offs |
| 12 | Brisbane Roar | 26 | 5 | 6 | 15 | 32 | 51 | −19 | 21 | Qualification for 2025 Australia Cup play-offs |
| 13 | Perth Glory | 26 | 4 | 5 | 17 | 22 | 56 | −34 | 17 | Qualification for 2025 Australia Cup play-offs |

Source: A-Leagues
Rules for classification: 1) points; 2) goal difference; 3) goals scored; 4) wins; 5) head-to-head results; 5a) head-to-head points; 5b) head-to-head goal difference; 6) Fair Play points; 7) away goal difference; 8) away goals per match; 9) home goal difference; 10) home goals per match; 11) toss of a coin in an event of a tie of two clubs.

==== Results summary ====
| Overall | | | | | | | | Home | | | | | | Away | | | | | |
| Pld | W | D | L | GF | GA | GD | Pts | W | D | L | GF | GA | GD | W | D | L | GF | GA | GD |
|---|---|---|---|---|---|---|---|---|---|---|---|---|---|---|---|---|---|---|---|
| 26 | 6 | 6 | 14 | 27 | 43 | −16 | 24 | 2 | 5 | 6 | 11 | 17 | −6 | 4 | 1 | 8 | 16 | 26 | −10 |

Last updated: 4 May 2025.
Source: Ultimate A-League
Home figures include Wellington Phoenix's 1–0 win on neutral ground against Melbourne Victory on 24 November 2024.

==== Results by round ====
| Round | 1 | 2 | 3 | 4 | 5 | 6 | 7 | 8 | 9 | 10 | 11 | 12 | 13 | 14 | 15 | 16 | 17 | 18 | 19 | 20 | 21 | 22 | 23 | 24 | 25 | 26 | 27 | 28 | 29 |
|---|---|---|---|---|---|---|---|---|---|---|---|---|---|---|---|---|---|---|---|---|---|---|---|---|---|---|---|---|---|
| Ground | H | A | H | A | N | B | A | H | A | H | B | A | H | H | A | H | B | H | A | A | H | A | A | H | A | H | A | A | H |
| Result | D | W | L | W | W | X | L | L | L | W | X | L | L | D | W | D | X | D | L | L | L | L | D | D | W | L | L | L | L |
| Position | 5 | 2 | 6 | 4 | 2 | 4 | 5 | 6 | 9 | 9 | 9 | 10 | 10 | 9 | 9 | 9 | 10 | 10 | 10 | 11 | 11 | 11 | 11 | 11 | 11 | 11 | 11 | 11 | 11 |
| Points | 1 | 4 | 4 | 7 | 10 | 10 | 10 | 10 | 10 | 13 | 13 | 13 | 13 | 14 | 17 | 18 | 18 | 19 | 19 | 19 | 19 | 19 | 20 | 21 | 24 | 24 | 24 | 24 | 24 |

Updated to match(es) played on 4 May 2025. Source: Ultimate A-League
A = Away; H = Home; N = Neutral; B = Bye; W = Win; D = Draw; L = Loss; X = Bye

==== Matches ====
| 20 October 2024 1 | Wellington Phoenix | 1–1 | Western United | Wellington |
| 16:00 NZDT | Barbarouses 45+2' | Report | Thurgate 76' | Stadium: Sky Stadium; Attendance: 7,535; Referee: Adam Kersey |

| 26 October 2024 2 | Perth Glory | 0–2 | Wellington Phoenix | Perth |
| 18:45 AWST | | Report | Wootton 39'; Payne 49' | Stadium: HBF Park; Attendance: 7,074; Referee: Lachlan Keevers |

| 2 November 2024 3 | Wellington Phoenix | 0–2 | Auckland FC | Wellington |
| 17:00 NZDT | | Report | Brimmer 89', 90+6' | Stadium: Sky Stadium; Attendance: 26,252; Referee: Adam Kersey |

| 10 November 2024 4 | Central Coast Mariners | 0–3 | Wellington Phoenix | Gosford |
| 16:00 AEDT | | Report | Ishige 15'; Barbarouses 40'; Sutton 53' | Stadium: Industree Group Stadium; Attendance: 6,493; Referee: Alex King |

| 24 November 2024 5 | Wellington Phoenix | 1–0 | Melbourne Victory | Sydney |
| 13:30 AEDT | Barbarouses 82' | Report | | Stadium: Allianz Stadium; Attendance: 3,478; Referee: Casey Reibelt |

| 7 December 2024 7 | Auckland FC | 2–1 | Wellington Phoenix | Auckland |
| 17:00 NZDT | Hughes 31' (o.g.); Pijnaker 70' | Report | Barbarouses 81' | Stadium: Go Media Stadium; Attendance: 26,253; Referee: Shaun Evans |

| 14 December 2024 8 | Wellington Phoenix | 1–2 | Macarthur FC | Wellington |
| 17:00 NZDT | Barbarouses 44' | Report | Germain 7'; Bosnjak 75' | Stadium: Sky Stadium; Attendance: 7,384; Referee: Campbell-Kirk Kawana-Waugh |

| 22 December 2024 9 | Western Sydney Wanderers | 4–1 | Wellington Phoenix | Sydney |
| 17:00 AEDT | Sapsford 1'; Kraev 10'; Antonsson 66'; Scicluna 90+4' | Report | Ishige 59' | Stadium: CommBank Stadium; Attendance: 6,341; Referee: Alex King |

| 28 December 2024 10 | Wellington Phoenix | 2–1 | Newcastle Jets | Wellington |
| 17:00 NZDT | Barbarouses 2'; Retre 59' | Report | Gibson 73' | Stadium: Sky Stadium; Attendance: 5,460; Referee: Jonathan Barreiro |

| 3 January 2025 12 | Melbourne City | 2–0 | Wellington Phoenix | Melbourne |
| 17:00 AEDT | Politidis 7'; Atkinson 83' | Report | | Stadium: AAMI Park; Attendance: 5,139; Referee: Shaun Evans |

| 11 January 2025 13 | Wellington Phoenix | 1–2 | Adelaide United | Wellington |
| 17:00 NZDT | Piper 50' | Report | Sheridan 7' (o.g.); Jovanovic 75' | Stadium: Sky Stadium; Attendance: 7,113; Referee: Alex King |

| 15 January 2025 14 | Wellington Phoenix | 0–0 | Sydney FC | Wellington |
| 19:00 NZDT | | Report | | Stadium: Sky Stadium; Attendance: 4,858; Referee: Shaun Evans |

| 20 January 2025 15 | Macarthur FC | 1–2 | Wellington Phoenix | Sydney |
| 19:00 AEDT | Hollman 16' | Report | Nagasawa 65'; Barbarouses 71' (pen.) | Stadium: Campbelltown Sports Stadium; Attendance: 3,456; Referee: Adam Kersey |

| 25 January 2025 16 | Wellington Phoenix | 0–0 | Central Coast Mariners | Christchurch |
| 17:00 NZDT | | Report | | Stadium: Apollo Projects Stadium; Attendance: 14,064; Referee: Tim Danaskos |

| 6 February 2025 18 | Wellington Phoenix | 1–1 | Brisbane Roar | Wellington |
| 17:00 NZDT | Hughes 61' | Report | Hore 71' | Stadium: Sky Stadium; Attendance: 9,084; Referee: Jack Morgan |

| 14 February 2025 19 | Melbourne Victory | 1–0 | Wellington Phoenix | Melbourne |
| 19:35 AEDT | Vergos 57' | Report | | Stadium: AAMI Park; Attendance: 9,374; Referee: Adam Bavcar |

| 22 February 2025 20 | Auckland FC | 6–1 | Wellington Phoenix | Auckland |
| 17:00 NZDT | Moreno 31', 60'; Rogerson 36', 40', 80'; Randall 90+3' | Report | Brooke-Smith 49' | Stadium: Go Media Stadium; Attendance: 27,009; Referee: Ben Abraham |

| 28 February 2025 21 | Wellington Phoenix | 0–1 | Melbourne City | Wellington |
| 19:30 NZDT | | Report | Tilio 51' | Stadium: Sky Stadium; Attendance: 5,716; Referee: Tim Danaskos |

| 8 March 2025 22 | Western United | 4–1 | Wellington Phoenix | Melbourne |
| 18:00 AEDT | Walatee 3'; Ibusuki 33'; Grimaldi 51', 62' | Report | Walker 82' | Stadium: Ironbark Fields; Attendance: 3,993; Referee: Shane Skinner |

| 16 March 2025 23 | Sydney FC | 1–1 | Wellington Phoenix | Sydney |
| 17:00 AEDT | Segecic 7' | Report | Barbarouses 38' | Stadium: Allianz Stadium; Attendance: 7,014; Referee: Shaun Evans |

| 29 March 2025 24 | Wellington Phoenix | 2–2 | Western Sydney Wanderers | Wellington |
| 17:00 NZDT | Piper 21'; Geraldes 69' | Report | Kraev 36'; Milanovic 89' | Stadium: Sky Stadium; Attendance: 3,698; Referee: Adam Bavcar |

| 6 April 2025 25 | Newcastle Jets | 1–2 | Wellington Phoenix | Newcastle |
| 17:00 AEST | Oluwayemi 65' (o.g.) | Report | Barbarouses 34'; Nagasawa 41' | Stadium: McDonald Jones Stadium; Attendance: 5,109; Referee: Alireza Faghani |

| 12 April 2025 26 | Wellington Phoenix | 2–3 | Melbourne Victory | Wellington |
| 17:00 NZST | Piper 10'; Retre 75' | Report | Velupillay 4'; Machach 45+1'; Vergos 50' | Stadium: Sky Stadium; Attendance: 5,035; Referee: Alireza Faghani |

| 18 April 2025 27 | Adelaide United | 3–2 | Wellington Phoenix | Adelaide |
| 19:05 ACST | Kikianis 8'; Mauk 12'; Goodwin 89' | Report | Barbarouses 31'; Hughes 35' | Stadium: Coopers Stadium; Attendance: 11,169; Referee: Tim Danaskos |

| 26 April 2025 28 | Brisbane Roar | 1–0 | Wellington Phoenix | Brisbane |
| 15:00 AEST | Berenguer 58' | Report | | Stadium: Suncorp Stadium; Attendance: Ben Abraham; Referee: 6,032 |

| 4 May 2025 29 | Wellington Phoenix | 0–2 | Perth Glory | Wellington |
| 19:30 NZST | | Report | Taggart 34', 90+2' | Stadium: Sky Stadium; Attendance: 4,190; Referee: Declan Woods |

=== Australia Cup ===
The playoff and subsequent rounds for the 2024 Australia Cup were held during the pre-season.

| 6 August 2024 Round of 32 | South Melbourne | 1–0 | Wellington Phoenix | Melbourne |
| 19:30 AEST | Sawyer 4' | Report | | Stadium: Lakeside Stadium; Attendance: 4,196; Referee: Jonathan Barreiro |

The playoff round for the 2025 Australia Cup will be held just after the regular season.

| 14 May 2025 Play-offs | Wellington Phoenix | 1–0 | Brisbane Roar | Darwin |
| 19:00 ACST | Barbarouses 39' | Report | | Stadium: Larrakia Park; Attendance: 1,813; Referee: Sam Kelly |

== Statistics ==
=== Appearances and goals ===
Includes all competitions. Players with no appearances not included in the list.

As of 14 May 2025

| No. | Pos. | Nat. | Player | A-League Men | | 2024 Australia Cup | | 2025 Australia Cup play-off | | Total | |
| No. | Pos. | Nat. | Player | Apps | Goals | Apps | Goals | Apps | Goals | Apps | Goals |
|---|---|---|---|---|---|---|---|---|---|---|---|
| 1 | GK | (England) | Josh Oluwayemi | 18 | 0 | 0 | 0 | 1 | 0 | 19 | 0 |
| 3 | DF | (New Zealand) | Corban Piper | 15+7 | 3 | 0 | 0 | 0 | 0 | 22 | 3 |
| 4 | DF | (England) | Scott Wootton | 25 | 1 | 1 | 0 | 1 | 0 | 27 | 1 |
| 5 | MF | (New Zealand) | Fin Roa Conchie | 4+5 | 0 | 1 | 0 | 0+1 | 0 | 11 | 0 |
| 6 | DF | (New Zealand) | Tim Payne | 19+1 | 1 | 0 | 0 | 0 | 0 | 20 | 1 |
| 7 | FW | (New Zealand) | Kosta Barbarouses | 25 | 10 | 0+1 | 0 | 1 | 1 | 27 | 11 |
| 8 | MF | (Australia) | Paulo Retre | 15+5 | 2 | 0 | 0 | 1 | 0 | 21 | 2 |
| 9 | FW | (Japan) | Hideki Ishige | 23+3 | 2 | 0 | 0 | 1 | 0 | 27 | 2 |
| 11 | FW | (North Macedonia) | Stefan Colakovski | 0+6 | 0 | 0 | 0 | 0 | 0 | 6 | 0 |
| 12 | MF | (Portugal) | Francisco Geraldes | 5 | 1 | 0 | 0 | 0 | 0 | 5 | 1 |
| 14 | MF | (New Zealand) | Alex Rufer | 17+2 | 0 | 0 | 0 | 1 | 0 | 20 | 0 |
| 15 | DF | (New Zealand) | Isaac Hughes | 24 | 2 | 1 | 0 | 0 | 0 | 25 | 2 |
| 17 | FW | (New Zealand) | Gabriel Sloane-Rodrigues | 0+1 | 0 | 1 | 0 | 1 | 0 | 3 | 0 |
| 18 | DF | (New Zealand) | Lukas Kelly-Heald | 11+5 | 0 | 1 | 0 | 1 | 0 | 18 | 0 |
| 19 | DF | (New Zealand) | Sam Sutton | 23 | 1 | 0 | 0 | 1 | 0 | 24 | 1 |
| 23 | FW | (New Zealand) | Luke Supyk | 1+5 | 0 | 1 | 0 | 0 | 0 | 7 | 0 |
| 25 | MF | (Japan) | Kazuki Nagasawa | 18+6 | 2 | 0 | 0 | 0+1 | 0 | 25 | 2 |
| 27 | DF | (New Zealand) | Matthew Sheridan | 22+3 | 0 | 1 | 0 | 1 | 0 | 27 | 0 |
| 29 | FW | (New Zealand) | Luke Brooke-Smith | 4+10 | 1 | 0 | 0 | 0+1 | 0 | 15 | 1 |
| 30 | GK | (New Zealand) | Alby Kelly-Heald | 8 | 0 | 1 | 0 | 0 | 0 | 9 | 0 |
| 36 | DF | (New Zealand) | Tze-Xuan Loke | 0 | 0 | 0+1 | 0 | 0 | 0 | 1 | 0 |
| 39 | DF | (New Zealand) | Jayden Smith | 0+1 | 0 | 0 | 0 | 0 | 0 | 1 | 0 |
| 41 | FW | (New Zealand) | Nathan Walker | 4+19 | 1 | 1 | 0 | 1 | 0 | 25 | 1 |
| 42 | FW | (New Zealand) | Fergus Gillion | 0 | 0 | 0+1 | 0 | 0 | 0 | 1 | 0 |
| 46 | MF | (New Zealand) | Lachlan Candy | 0+1 | 0 | 0+1 | 0 | 0 | 0 | 2 | 0 |
Player(s) transferred out but featured this season
| 10 | FW | (England) | David Ball | 0+1 | 0 | 0 | 0 | 0 | 0 | 1 | 0 |
| 12 | MF | (Iraq) | Mohamed Al-Taay | 1+7 | 0 | 1 | 0 | 0 | 0 | 9 | 0 |
| 21 | FW | (New Zealand) | Marco Rojas | 2+5 | 0 | 0+1 | 0 | 0 | 0 | 8 | 0 |
| 24 | FW | (New Zealand) | Oskar van Hattum | 1+3 | 0 | 1 | 0 | 0 | 0 | 5 | 0 |

=== Disciplinary record ===
Includes all competitions. The list is sorted by squad number when total cards are equal. Players with no cards not included in the list.

As of 14 May 2025

| Rank | No. | Pos. | Nat. | Name | A-League Men | | | Australia Cup | | | 2025 Australia Cup play-off | | | Total | | |
| Rank | No. | Pos. | Nat. | Name | Yellow card | (yellow card) (yellow-red card) | Red card | Yellow card | (yellow card) (yellow-red card) | Red card | Yellow card | (yellow card) (yellow-red card) | Red card | Yellow card | (yellow card) (yellow-red card) | Red card |
|---|---|---|---|---|---|---|---|---|---|---|---|---|---|---|---|---|
| 1 | 14 | MF | (New Zealand) | Alex Rufer | 7 | 0 | 0 | 0 | 0 | 0 | 0 | 1 | 0 | 7 | 1 | 0 |
| 2 | 19 | DF | (New Zealand) | Sam Sutton | 6 | 0 | 0 | 0 | 0 | 0 | 0 | 0 | 0 | 6 | 0 | 0 |
| 3 | 8 | MF | (Australia) | Paulo Retre | 4 | 0 | 0 | 0 | 0 | 0 | 0 | 0 | 0 | 4 | 0 | 0 |
| 4 | 3 | DF | (New Zealand) | Corban Piper | 3 | 0 | 0 | 0 | 0 | 0 | 0 | 0 | 0 | 3 | 0 | 0 |
| 4 | 7 | FW | (New Zealand) | Kosta Barbarouses | 2 | 0 | 0 | 0 | 0 | 0 | 1 | 0 | 0 | 3 | 0 | 0 |
| 4 | 25 | MF | (Japan) | Kazuki Nagasawa | 3 | 0 | 0 | 0 | 0 | 0 | 0 | 0 | 0 | 3 | 0 | 0 |
| 7 | 6 | DF | (New Zealand) | Tim Payne | 2 | 0 | 0 | 0 | 0 | 0 | 0 | 0 | 0 | 2 | 0 | 0 |
| 7 | 27 | DF | (New Zealand) | Matthew Sheridan | 2 | 0 | 0 | 0 | 0 | 0 | 0 | 0 | 0 | 2 | 0 | 0 |
| 9 | 4 | DF | (Japan) | Scott Wootton | 1 | 0 | 0 | 0 | 0 | 0 | 0 | 0 | 0 | 1 | 0 | 0 |
| 9 | 9 | FW | (Japan) | Hideki Ishige | 1 | 0 | 0 | 0 | 0 | 0 | 0 | 0 | 0 | 1 | 0 | 0 |
| 9 | 12 | MF | (Portugal) | Francisco Geraldes | 1 | 0 | 0 | 0 | 0 | 0 | 0 | 0 | 0 | 1 | 0 | 0 |
| 9 | 18 | DF | (New Zealand) | Lukas Kelly-Heald | 1 | 0 | 0 | 0 | 0 | 0 | 0 | 0 | 0 | 1 | 0 | 0 |
| 9 | 29 | FW | (New Zealand) | Luke Brooke-Smith | 1 | 0 | 0 | 0 | 0 | 0 | 0 | 0 | 0 | 1 | 0 | 0 |
| 9 | 30 | GK | (New Zealand) | Alby Kelly-Heald | 1 | 0 | 0 | 0 | 0 | 0 | 0 | 0 | 0 | 1 | 0 | 0 |
Player(s) transferred out but featured this season
| 1 | 12 | MF | (Iraq) | Mohamed Al-Taay | 0 | 0 | 0 | 1 | 0 | 0 | 0 | 0 | 0 | 1 | 0 | 0 |
| 1 | 24 | FW | (New Zealand) | Oskar van Hattum | 1 | 0 | 0 | 0 | 0 | 0 | 0 | 0 | 0 | 1 | 0 | 0 |
| Total | | | | | 36 | 0 | 0 | 1 | 0 | 0 | 1 | 1 | 0 | 38 | 1 | 0 |

=== Clean sheets ===
Includes all competitions. The list is sorted by squad number when total clean sheets are equal. Numbers in parentheses represent games where both goalkeepers participated and both kept a clean sheet; the number in parentheses is awarded to the goalkeeper who was substituted on, whilst a full clean sheet is awarded to the goalkeeper who was on the field at the start of play. Goalkeepers with no clean sheets not included in the list.

As of 14 May 2025

| Rank | No. | Nat. | Goalkeeper | A-League Men | Australia Cup | 2025 Australia Cup play-off | Total |
|---|---|---|---|---|---|---|---|
| 1 | 1 | (England) | Josh Oluwayemi | 3 | 0 | 1 | 4 |
| 2 | 30 | (New Zealand) | Alby Kelly-Heald | 2 | 0 | 0 | 2 |
| Total | | | | 5 | 0 | 1 | 6 |

== Reserve team season ==
=== Competitions ===
==== Overall record ====
| Competition | First match | Last match | Starting round | Record | | | | | | | |
| Competition | First match | Last match | Starting round | Pld | W | D | L | GF | GA | GD | Win % |
|---|---|---|---|---|---|---|---|---|---|---|---|
| Central League | 29 March 2025 | 30 August 2025 | Matchday 1 | 3 | 3 | 0 | 0 | 11 | 1 | +10 | 100.00 |
| National League | September 2025 | November 2025 | Matchday 1 | 0 | 0 | 0 | 0 | 0 | 0 | +0 | — |
| Chatham Cup | May 2025 | TBD | Round 2 | 0 | 0 | 0 | 0 | 0 | 0 | +0 | — |
| Total | | | | 3 | 3 | 0 | 0 | 11 | 1 | +10 | 100.00 |

Last updated: 12 April 2025
Source: Soccerway

==== Central League ====
===== League table =====
| Pos | Team | Pld | W | D | L | GF | GA | GD | Pts | Qualification |
|---|---|---|---|---|---|---|---|---|---|---|
| 2 | Miramar Rangers | 18 | 12 | 3 | 3 | 53 | 22 | +31 | 39 | Qualification to National League Championship |
| 3 | Western Suburbs | 18 | 10 | 4 | 4 | 57 | 24 | +33 | 34 | Qualification to National League Championship |
| 4 | Wellington Phoenix Reserves (Note: Wellington Phoenix Reserves gain automatic entry into the National League Championship phase and cannot be relegated due to the A-League Men requirements.) | 18 | 8 | 5 | 5 | 44 | 26 | +18 | 29 | Qualification to National League Championship |
| 5 | Napier City Rovers | 18 | 8 | 4 | 6 | 45 | 24 | +21 | 28 | |
| 6 | Island Bay United | 18 | 5 | 4 | 9 | 32 | 32 | 0 | 19 | |

Source: Capital Football
Rules for classification: 1) Points; 2) Goal difference; 3) Goals scored; 4) Goals against; 5) Head to head; 6) Disciplinary record; 7) Coin toss

==== Chatham Cup ====
Win Draw Loss Fixtures

== See also ==
- 2024–25 Wellington Phoenix FC (women) season
