= New Zealand Derby (football) =

New Zealand football derby

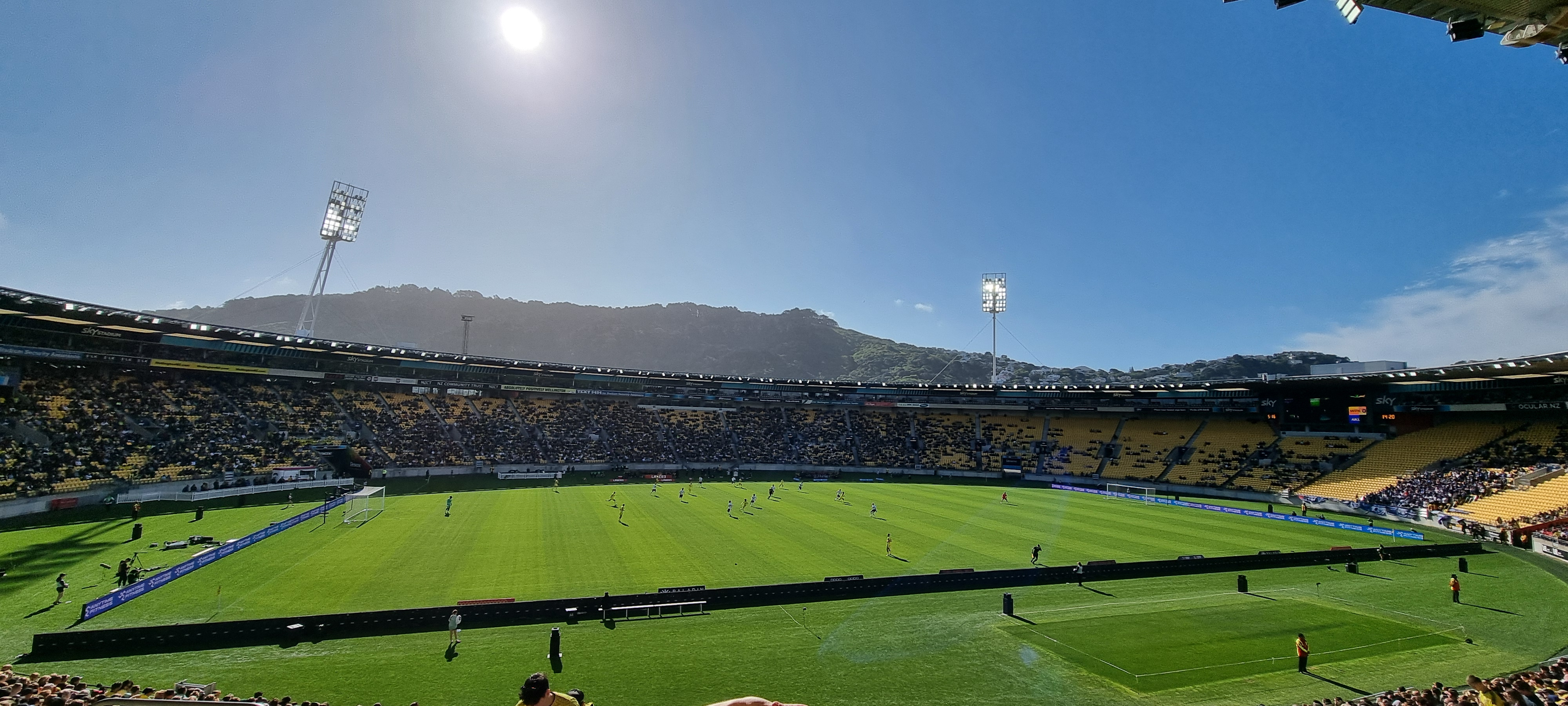
- First ever New Zealand Derby on 2 November 2024 at Sky Stadium, Wellington.
- Location: Auckland; Wellington
- Teams: Auckland FC; Wellington Phoenix
- First meeting: 2 November 2024; A-League Men; Wellington Phoenix 0–2 Auckland FC
- Latest meeting: 7 November 2026; A-League Men; Auckland FC 0–0 Wellington Phoenix
- Next meeting: 19 December 2026; A-League Men; Wellington Phoenix FC v Auckland FC
- Stadiums: Mount Smart Stadium (Note: Is known as Go Media Stadium due to sponsorship rights.) (Auckland); Wellington Regional Stadium (Note: Was previously known as Sky Stadium due to sponsorship rights.) (Note: Is known as Hnry Stadium due to sponsorship rights.)(Wellington)

Statistics
- Total meetings: 7
- Most wins: Auckland FC (6)
- All-time series: Auckland FC: 6 Drawn: 1 Wellington Phoenix: 0
- Largest victory: Auckland FC 6–1 Wellington Phoenix; A-League Men (22 February 2025); Wellington Phoenix 0–5 Auckland FC; A-League Men (21 February 2026)

The New Zealand Derby (Māori: Mai te Raki ki te Tonga), also known as the Kiwi Derby is a local football derby in the A-League Men, Australia's top soccer league, between the two New Zealand-based clubs in the league: Auckland FC and Wellington Phoenix.

== History ==
Originally dubbed the "Kiwi Classico" by the A-League, it was renamed to the New Zealand Derby, with the Maori-language name Mai te Raki ki te Tonga - 'from the North to the South' being presented at the first meeting of the two clubs.

=== 2024–25 ===
The first meeting between the two clubs took place on 2 November 2024 at Sky Stadium in Wellington, during the third matchday of the 2024–25 season. The match was played in front of 26,252 spectators and finished 2–0 to Auckland, with former Wellington player Alex Paulsen keeping a clean sheet and Jake Brimmer scoring in the 89th and 90+6 minutes. Following the match, Auckland hired a digital billboard outside Sky Stadium which read, "Welcome to Ellington. We took the W back to Auckland".

The second meeting was played at Go Media Stadium in front of 26,253 spectators and ended 2–1 to Auckland. In that match, Auckland conceded their first-ever competitive goal, scored by Kosta Barbarouses. The third encounter, also held at Go Media Stadium, recorded Auckland FC's largest attendance of 27,009 and saw the club secure their biggest win, defeating Wellington Phoenix 6–1. The match included the club’s first hat-trick, scored by Logan Rogerson, while Luke Brooke-Smith became the Phoenix’s youngest goalscorer.

=== 2025–26 ===
The fourth meeting took place in Round 4 of the 2025–26 A-League Men, in front of 12,091, with Phoenix coach Giancarlo Italiano personally handing out tickets around Wellington on the morning of the game. Sam Cosgrove opened the scoring after 27 seconds and later added a second goal following an equaliser from Ifeanyi Eze. Auckland were reduced to nine men following red cards to Dan Hall and Logan Rogerson in the second half but held on to preserve their lead.

The second meeting of the 2025–26 season was held at Go Media Stadium before a crowd of 21,997, with Auckland winning 3–1 after Manjrekar James was sent off in the 46th minute. During the match, Auckland were awarded their first ever penalties in the clubs history, both of which were saved by Josh Oluwayemi from Sam Cosgrove and Francis de Vries.

The sixth meeting between the sides drew the lowest attendance of the derby so far, with 10,040 spectators. The Phoenix were defeated 5–0, marking the Phoenix’s heaviest home defeat of the season and Auckland FC’s largest away win to date. The scoring opened with an own goal from Josh Oluwayemi, followed by a brace from Jesse Randall and further goals from Guillermo May and Lachlan Brook. Following the match, Wellington Phoenix head coach Giancarlo Italiano resigned, having failed to record a win against Auckland FC, with an aggregate score of 20–4 across the six meetings.

=== 2026–27 ===
In the build up to the seventh New Zealand Derby, the tides heavily swung into Wellingtons favor. It saw the Phoenix top of the table after three matches with nine points, while Auckland were in sixth with just four points, which saw Wellington enter the derby in a higher league position than Auckland for the first time ever. A week prior on 31 October 2026, the second edition of the reserves Derby saw Wellington defeat Auckland in a competitive match for the first time ever.

== Results ==
Competition	#	Date	Home team	Score	Away team	Goals (Wellington)	Goals (Auckland)	Venue	Attendance	Ref
2024–25 A-League Men	1	2 November 2024	Wellington	0–2	Auckland	—	Brimmer (2) 88', 90+6'	Sky Stadium	26,252	
2024–25 A-League Men	2	7 December 2024	Auckland	2–1	Wellington	Barbarouses 82'	Hughes 31' (o.g.), Pijnaker 70'	Mount Smart Stadium	26,253	
2024–25 A-League Men	3	22 February 2025	Auckland	6–1	Wellington	Brooke-Smith 49'	Moreno (2) 31', 60', Rogerson (3) 36', 40', 80', Randall 90+3'	Mount Smart Stadium	27,009	
2025–26 A-League Men	4	8 November 2025	Wellington	1–2	Auckland	Eze 9'	Cosgrove (2) 1', 34'	Sky Stadium	12,091	
2025–26 A-League Men	5	6 December 2025	Auckland	3–1	Wellington	Rufer 55'	Brook 7', De Vries 72', May 80'	Mount Smart Stadium	21,997	
2025–26 A-League Men	6	21 February 2026	Wellington	0–5	Auckland	—	Oluwayemi 24' (o.g.), Randall (2) 30', 45+5', May 41', Brook 74'	Sky Stadium	10,040	
2026–27 A-League Men	7	7 November 2026	Auckland	0–0	Wellington	—	—	Mount Smart Stadium	18,477	
2026–27 A-League Men	8	19 December 2026	Wellington		Auckland			Hnry Stadium		
2026–27 A-League Men	9	13 February 2027	Auckland		Wellington			Mount Smart Stadium		

=== Comparative league placings ===
Pos.	25	26
1	1	
2		
3		3
4		
5		
6		
7		
8		8
9		
10		
11	11	
12		
13		—N/a

=== Reserve team results ===
Competition	#	Date	Home team	Score	Away team	Goals (Wellington)	Goals (Auckland)	Venue	Ref
2025 National League	1	4 October 2025	Auckland	2–1	Wellington	Gardiner 16'	Nabenu 6', Burns 74'	Fred Taylor Park	
2026 National League	2	31 October 2026	Wellington	3–2	Auckland	Thomas 40', Grosso 45+1', Henry 62'	Hale 31', 47'	Fraser Park	

== Head-to-head ==
As of 7 November 2026

Competition	Matches	Auckland wins	Draws	Wellington wins	Auckland goals	Wellington goals
A-League Men regular season	7	6	1	0	20	4
A-League Men Finals Series	0	0	0	0	0	0
All matches	7	6	1	0	20	4

== Honours ==
Trophy	Auckland	Wellington
A-League Men Premiership	1	0
A-League Men Championship	1	0
Total	2	0

== Players who have played for both teams ==
Below are the players who have played for both Auckland FC and Wellington Phoenix.

Currently no players have played for Auckland before Wellington.

Player	Pos.	Wellington tenure	Auckland tenure
(New Zealand) Alex Paulsen	GK	2021–2024	2024–2025
(Australia) Scott Galloway	DF	2017–2018	2024–2025
(New Zealand) Logan Rogerson	FW	2016–2018	2024–present
(New Zealand) Callan Elliot	DF	2018–2020, 2021–2023	2024–present
(New Zealand) Oliver Sail	GK	2014–2023	2025–present

== Records ==
- Biggest win: 5 goals; Auckland 6–1 Wellington (22 February 2025), Wellington 0–5 Auckland (21 February 2026).
- Most goals scored: 7; Auckland 6–1 Wellington (22 February 2025).
- Most consecutive wins: 6, Auckland (2 November 2024 – 21 February 2026).
- Highest attendance: 27,009 at Mount Smart Stadium (Auckland 6–1 Wellington; 22 February 2025).
- Average attendance: 20,303.
- Lowest attendance: 10,040 at Sky Stadium (Wellington 0–5 Auckland; 21 February 2026).

== Statistics ==
As of 7 November 2026

=== Players ===
==== Top goalscorers ====
Rank	Player	Club	Total
1	(New Zealand) Jesse Randall	Auckland	3
1	(New Zealand) Logan Rogerson	Auckland	3
3	(Australia) Jake Brimmer	Auckland	2
3	(Australia) Lachlan Brook	Auckland	2
3	(England) Sam Cosgrove	Auckland	2
3	(Uruguay) Guillermo May	Auckland	2
3	(Colombia) Neyder Moreno	Auckland	2
8	(New Zealand) Kosta Barbarouses	Wellington	1
8	(New Zealand) Luke Brooke-Smith	Wellington	1
8	(New Zealand) Francis de Vries	Auckland	1
8	(Nigeria) Ifeanyi Eze	Wellington	1
8	(New Zealand) Nando Pijnaker	Auckland	1
8	(New Zealand) Alex Rufer	Wellington	1

==== Most appearances ====
Rank	Player	Club	Apps
1	(New Zealand) Francis de Vries	Auckland	7
1	(Chile) Luis Gallegos	Auckland	7
1	(New Zealand) Logan Rogerson	Auckland	7
4	(Australia) Jake Brimmer	Auckland	6
4	(Uruguay) Guillermo May	Auckland	6
6	(New Zealand) Cameron Howieson	Auckland	5
6	(Belgium) Louis Verstraete	Auckland	5
6	(Fiji) Dan Hall	Auckland	5
6	(Japan) Hiroki Sakai	Auckland	5
6	(New Zealand) Nando Pijnaker	Auckland	5
6	(New Zealand) Callan Elliot	Auckland	5
1	(New Zealand) Alex Rufer	Wellington	7
1	(New Zealand) Matthew Sheridan	Wellington	7
3	(New Zealand) Isaac Hughes	Wellington	6
3	(Japan) Kazuki Nagasawa	Wellington	6
3	(New Zealand) Corban Piper	Wellington	6
6	(England) Josh Oluwayemi	Wellington	5
6	(New Zealand) Lukas Kelly-Heald	Wellington	5
8	(New Zealand) Fin Roa Conchie	Wellington	4
8	(Australia) Carlo Armiento	Wellington	4
8	(New Zealand) Kosta Barbarouses	Wellington	4
8	(Nigeria) Ifeanyi Eze	Wellington	4
8	(New Zealand) Tim Payne	Wellington	4
8	(England) Scott Wootton	Wellington	4

==== Clean sheets ====
Rank	Player	Club	Period	Clean sheets
1	(New Zealand) Michael Woud	Auckland	2026–present	2
2	(New Zealand) Henry Gray	Wellington	2026–present	1
2	(New Zealand) Alex Paulsen	Auckland	2024–2025	1

=== Hat-tricks ===
One player has scored a hat-trick in official New Zealand Derby matches.

No.	Player	For	Score	Date	Competition	Stadium
1	(New Zealand) Logan Rogerson	Auckland	6–1 (H)	22 February 2025	2024–25 A-League Men	Mount Smart Stadium

=== Managers ===
==== Most appearances ====
Rank	Manager	Team	Matches	Years	Competition(s) (matches)
1	(Australia) Steve Corica	Auckland	6	2024–2026	A-League Men (6)
1	(Australia) Giancarlo Italiano	Wellington	6	2024–2026	A-League Men (6)
3	(New Zealand) Chris Greenacre	Wellington	1	2026–present	A-League Men (1)
3	(Portugal) Pedro Moreira	Auckland	1	2026–present	A-League Men (1)

==== Most wins ====
Rank	Manager	Club	Period	Wins
1	(Australia) Steve Corica	Auckland	2024–2026	6
