= Kelly-Heald =

Kelly-Heald is a compound surname. Notable people with the surname include:

- Alby Kelly-Heald (born 2005), New Zealand footballer, twin of Lukas
- Lukas Kelly-Heald (born 2005), New Zealand footballer, twin of Alby
