= Fergus Gillion =

New Zealand footballer

Personal information
- Full name: Fergus William Gillion
- Date of birth: 19 January 2005 (age 21)
- Place of birth: Auckland, New Zealand
- Position: Midfielder

Team information
- Current team: Auckland City
- Number: 16

Youth career
- –2019: Onehunga Sports
- 2020–2021: Auckland United
- Western Suburbs

Senior career*
Years	Team	Apps	(Gls)
2022	Waterside Karori	7	(2)
2022–2025	Wellington Phoenix Reserves	45	(2)
2023–2025	Wellington Phoenix	2	(0)
2026	Bula FC	18	(0)
2026–	Auckland City	8	(0)

International career
2024–2025	New Zealand U20	8	(1)
- * Club domestic league appearances and goals as of 29 August 2026

Fergus William Gillion (born 19 January 2005) is a New Zealand footballer who plays as a Midfielder for Northern League club Auckland City.

== Club career ==
=== Youth career ===
Gillion played for Onehunga Sports and then Auckland United at youth level, before joining the Phoenix academy in 2022.

=== Wellington Phoenix ===
On 27 August 2023, Gillion made his debut for the Wellington Phoenix in an Australia Cup match against Melbourne City. Gillion made his A-League Men debut on 28 October 2023, making two league appearances in the 2023–24 season.

Gillion would make one substitute appearance in Wellington's 2025 Australia Cup run in their opening match against Perth Glory. Following a 1–1 draw the match went to penalty shoot-out, where Gillion converted his penalty as the Phoenix advanced to the next round.

=== Bula FC ===
Following his departure from the Phoenix, Gillion signed for Fijian club Bula FC to take part in their inaugural OFC Professional League campaign.

On 17 January 2026, Gillion made his debut for Bula FC in a 2–2 draw against Vanuatu United, starting in both Bula FC's first ever official match as well as the first ever match of the OFC Professional League competition.

Gillion made 18 appearances for Bula FC and picked up one assist in a 1–2 victory over PNG Hekari. Gillion would depart the club following the conclusion of their season.

=== Auckland City ===
On 19 June 2026, Gillion signed for Northern League club Auckland City.

On 20 June 2026, Gillion made his debut for Auckland City in a Northern League fixture against Birkenhead United.

== International career ==
Gillion was called up for the New Zealand U20 squad for the 2024 OFC U-19 Men's Championship.

Gillion was named as part of the 21-player New Zealand U20 squad for the 2025 FIFA U-20 World Cup that took place in Chile from September to October 2025. Gillion made three appearances in the tournament, with New Zealand exiting after the conclusion of the group stage.

== Personal life ==
Gillion is the younger brother of Western Sydney Wanderers forward Liam Gillion.

== Career statistics ==
=== Club ===
As of match played on 22 August 2026

Appearances and goals by club, season and competition
Club	Season	League			Cup		Others		Total	
Club	Season	Division	Apps	Goals	Apps	Goals	Apps	Goals	Apps	Goals
Waterside Karori	2022	National League	7	2	—		—		7	2
Wellington Phoenix Reserves	2022	National League	5	0	—		—		5	0
Wellington Phoenix Reserves	2023	National League	17	0	—		—		17	0
Wellington Phoenix Reserves	2024	National League	24	2	1	0	—		25	2
Wellington Phoenix Reserves	Total		46	2	1	0	—		47	2
Wellington Phoenix	2023–24	A-League Men	2	0	1	0	0	0	3	0
Wellington Phoenix	2024–25	A-League Men	0	0	1	0	—		1	0
Wellington Phoenix	2025–26	A-League Men	0	0	1	0	—		1	0
Wellington Phoenix	Total		2	0	3	0	—		5	0
Bula	2026	—			—		18	0	18	0
Auckland City	2026	National League	8	0	1	0	1	0	10	0
Career total			63	0	5	0	0	0	123	0

== Honours ==
New Zealand

- OFC U-19 Championship: 2024
