= Lachlan Candy =

New Zealand footballer

Personal information
- Full name: Lachlan Candy
- Date of birth: 22 August 2005 (age 21)
- Place of birth: New Zealand
- Position: Midfielder

Team information
- Current team: Mornington

Youth career
- Waterside Karori
- Western Suburbs
- 2021–2023: Wellington Phoenix

Senior career*
Years	Team	Apps	(Gls)
2023–2025	Wellington Phoenix Reserves	17	(2)
2024	→ Waterside Karori (loan)	10	(4)
2024–2025	Wellington Phoenix	1	(0)
2026	Oakleigh Cannons	0	(0)
2026–	Mornington	0	(0)

International career^{‡}
2024–	New Zealand U20	4	(1)
- * Club domestic league appearances and goals as of 17 May 2025 ‡ National team caps and goals as of 18 July 2024

Lachlan Candy (born 22 August 2005) is a New Zealand footballer who plays for Mornington.

== Club career ==
=== Youth career ===
Candy played for Waterside Karori and Western Suburbs at youth level, before joining the Phoenix academy in 2021.

=== Wellington Phoenix ===
On 6 August 2024, Candy made his debut for the Wellington Phoenix in an Australia Cup match against South Melbourne. During the first half of the 2024 season, Candy was loaned out to Waterside Karori.

Candy made his A-League Men debut on Waitangi Day 2025, coming on as a second-half substitute against Brisbane Roar.

== International career ==
Candy was called up for the New Zealand U20 squad for the 2024 OFC U-19 Men's Championship. He made his debut on 9 July 2024 in a 5–0 win over Samoa. Candy scored his first goal in the final of the tournament, as New Zealand beat New Caledonia 4–0.

== Style of play ==
Candy has been described as a "versatile forward" best known for his speed, mobility and smart technique.

== Career statistics ==
=== Club ===
As of match played on 17 December 2025.

Appearances and goals by club, season and competition
Club	Season	League			Cup		Others		Total	
Club	Season	Division	Apps	Goals	Apps	Goals	Apps	Goals	Apps	Goals
Wellington Phoenix Reserves	2023	National League	3	0	—		—		3	0
Wellington Phoenix Reserves	2024	National League	10	1	0	0	—		10	1
Wellington Phoenix Reserves	2025	National League	21	5	1	0	—		22	5
Wellington Phoenix Reserves	Total		34	6	1	0	—		35	6
Waterside Karori (loan)	2024	National League	10	4	2	2	—		12	6
Wellington Phoenix	2024–25	A-League Men	1	0	1	0	—		2	0
Oakleigh Cannons	2026	NPL Victoria	0	0	0	0	—		0	0
Mornington	2026	State League 1 SE	0	0	0	0	—		0	0
Career total			45	10	4	2	0	0	49	12

== Honours ==
New Zealand U20

- OFC U-19 Championship: 2024
