= Oluwaferanmi =

- Gender: Unisex
- Language: Yoruba

Origin
- Language: Nigeria
- Meaning: God loves me

Other names
- Nickname: Feranmi

Oluwaferanmi is a unisex given name. Notable people with the name include:

- Elijah Anuoluwapo Oluwaferanmi Oluwatomi Oluwalana Ayomikulehin Adebayo (born 1998), English footballer
- Josh Oluwayemi (born 2001), English footballer
