= Luke Brooke-Smith =

New Zealand footballer (born 2008)

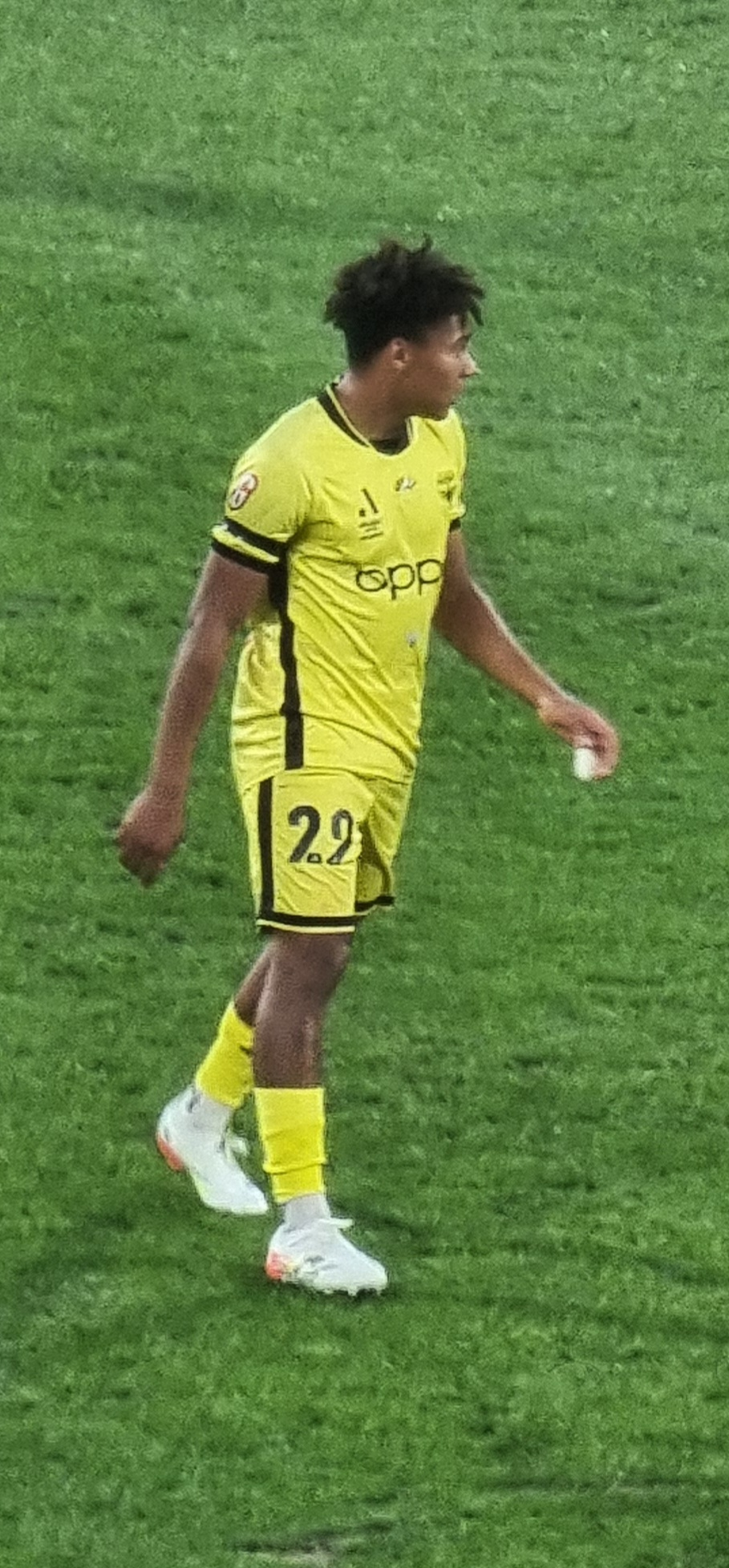
- Brooke-Smith playing for the Wellington Phoenix in 2025

Personal information
- Full name: Luke Joseph Brooke-Smith
- Date of birth: 6 June 2008 (age 18)
- Place of birth: Whangārei, New Zealand
- Height: 1.73 m (5 ft 8 in)
- Position: Left winger

Team information
- Current team: Portsmouth
- Number: 28

Youth career
- RH3 Football Academy
- Cambridge

Senior career*
Years	Team	Apps	(Gls)
2023	Cambridge	10	(5)
2024	Hamilton Wanderers	15	(0)
2024–2025	Wellington Phoenix Reserves	5	(1)
2024–2026	Wellington Phoenix	31	(1)
2026–	Portsmouth	3	(0)

International career^{‡}
2024–2026	New Zealand U17	5	(5)
2025–	New Zealand	1	(0)
- * Club domestic league appearances and goals as of 17 April 2026 ‡ National team caps and goals as of 9 September 2025

Luke Joseph Brooke-Smith (born 6 June 2008) is a New Zealand footballer who plays as a left winger for EFL Championship club Portsmouth and the New Zealand national team.

== Early life ==
Brooke-Smith was born on 8 June 2008 in Whangārei, New Zealand, to an English father and Malawian mother. Growing up, he was a competitive BMX rider. A native of Northland region, he moved with his family to Cambridge at the age of eleven.

== Club career ==
=== Hamilton Wanderers and Wellington Phoenix ===
As a youth player, Brooke-Smith joined the RH3 Football Academy, before starting his career with Cambridge in 2023. In 2024, he signed for Hamilton Wanderers. The same year, he signed for Wellington Phoenix, where, at the age of 16 years and 199 days, he became the youngest New Zealand player to play in the A-League Men.

On 22 February 2025, Brooke-Smith scored Wellington Phoenix's only goal in a 6–1 defeat to Auckland FC in the New Zealand derby. The goal, his first for the club, made him the youngest goalscorer in Wellington Phoenix history at 16 years and 261 days old, beating the previous record set by Ben Waine.

=== Portsmouth ===
On 28 July 2026, Brooke-Smith signed for EFL Championship club Portsmouth on a four-year contract for an undisclosed fee. Brooke-Smith became the second New Zealand footballer to play for the club after Brian Turner. Brooke-Smith made his debut in the first round of the EFL Cup, starting in a 3–1 defeat to West Ham United at the London Stadium.

== International career ==
Brooke-Smith made his international debut for New Zealand against Australia in a 3–1 loss on 9 September 2025 at Mount Smart Stadium, Auckland. Brooke-Smith came into the match in place of Sarpreet Singh in the 79th minute, and is the second youngest All Whites debutant in history, behind only Ceri Evans.

Brooke-Smith was named as part of the 21-player New Zealand U-20 squad for the 2025 FIFA U-20 World Cup that took place in Chile from September to October 2025. Brooke-Smith made three appearances and scored one goal in the tournament, with New Zealand exiting after the conclusion of the group stage.

== Career statistics ==
=== Club ===
Appearances and goals by club, season and competition
Club	Season	League			Cup (Note: Appearance(s) in the Chatham Cup, Australia Cup, FA Cup)		Other		Total	
Club	Season	Division	Apps	Goals	Apps	Goals	Apps	Goals	Apps	Goals
Cambridge FC	2023	NRFL Conference	10	5	0	0	—		10	5
Hamilton Wanderers	2024	National League	15	0	2	2	—		17	2
Wellington Phoenix Reserves	2024	National League	3	0	0	0	—		3	0
Wellington Phoenix Reserves	2025	National League	2	1	0	0	—		2	1
Wellington Phoenix Reserves	Total		30	6	2	2	—		32	8
Wellington Phoenix	2024–25	A-League Men	14	1	0	0	0	0	15	1
Wellington Phoenix	2025–26	A-League Men	19	0	4	0	0	0	23	0
Wellington Phoenix	Total		33	1	4	0	0	0	38	1
Portsmouth	2026–27	Championship	0	0	0	0	1	0	1	0
Career total			63	7	7	2	0	0	71	9
