= Jayden Smith =

New Zealand footballer (born 2007)

Personal information
- Full name: Jayden James Smith
- Date of birth: 4 July 2007 (age 19)
- Place of birth: Nelson, New Zealand
- Height: 1.90 m (6 ft 3 in)
- Position: Defender

Team information
- Current team: Wellington Phoenix
- Number: 39

Youth career
- –2023: FC Nelson
- 2023–2024: Wellington Phoenix

Senior career*
Years	Team	Apps	(Gls)
2023–	Wellington Phoenix Reserves	27	(1)
2024–	Wellington Phoenix	2	(0)
- * Club domestic league appearances and goals as of 23 January 2026

Jayden James Smith (born 4 July 2007) is a New Zealand footballer who plays for the Wellington Phoenix.

== Club career ==
=== Youth career ===
Smith played for FC Nelson at youth and senior level, before joining the Phoenix academy in 2023. Smith originally played in the midfield, before transitioning to a centre-back after joining the Phoenix Academy. He attended Nelson College while living in Nelson.

=== Wellington Phoenix ===
Smith signed his first pro-contract for the club on 7 October 2024. On 20 October 2024, Smith made his debut for the Wellington Phoenix in an A-League Men match against Western United.

== International career ==
Smith was called up for the New Zealand U20 squad for the first time in May 2025, for two friendlies against Chile.

Smith was named as part of the 21-player New Zealand U20 squad for the 2025 FIFA U-20 World Cup that took place in Chile from September to October 2025. Smith made three appearances in the tournament, with New Zealand exiting after the conclusion of the group stage.

== Career statistics ==
=== Club ===
As of match played on 24 May 2025.

Appearances and goals by club, season and competition
Club	Season	League			Cup		Others		Total	
Club	Season	Division	Apps	Goals	Apps	Goals	Apps	Goals	Apps	Goals
Wellington Phoenix Reserves	2023	National League	6	0	—		—		6	0
Wellington Phoenix Reserves	2024	National League	17	1	1	0	—		18	1
Wellington Phoenix Reserves	2025	National League	4	0	0	0	—		4	0
Wellington Phoenix Reserves	Total		27	1	0	0	—		28	1
Wellington Phoenix	2024–25	A-League Men	1	0	0	0	—		1	0
Career total			28	1	1	0	0	0	29	1
