= Xuan Loke =

New Zealand footballer

- Loke playing for the Wellington Phoenix in 2026.

Personal information
- Full name: Tze-Xuan Loke
- Date of birth: 26 March 2005 (age 21)
- Place of birth: Singapore
- Position: Right back

Team information
- Current team: Wellington Phoenix
- Number: 24

Youth career
- 2010-2013: Green Island
- 2014-2017: Dunedin Technical
- 2018–2021: Olé Football Academy
- 2022–2023: Wellington Phoenix

Senior career*
Years	Team	Apps	(Gls)
2021	Western Suburbs	3	(0)
2022–	Wellington Phoenix Reserves	42	(5)
2024–	Wellington Phoenix	6	(0)

International career^{‡}
2024–	New Zealand U20	6	(1)
- * Club domestic league appearances and goals as of 17 April 2026 ‡ National team caps and goals as of 10 October 2025

Tze-Xuan Loke (Chinese: 陆志轩, romanized: Zì Xuān, pronounced [tsɹ̩˨˩˦ ɕyɛn˥ ˈloʊˈk]; born 26 March 2005) is a professional footballer who plays for the Wellington Phoenix. Born in Singapore, he represents New Zealand at the youth level.

== Club career ==
=== Youth career ===
Born in Singapore, Loke moved to Dunedin with his parents at a young age. Loke played for Green Island and Dunedin Technical at youth and senior level, before joining the Olé Football Academy in 2021. In 2022, Loke joined the Phoenix academy.

=== Wellington Phoenix ===
Loke signed his first pro-contract for the club on 20 December 2024, after captaining the reserves side. On 6 August 2024, Loke made his debut for the Wellington Phoenix in an Australia Cup match against South Melbourne.

Loke made his A-League Men debut for the Phoenix on 18 October 2025 in a 2–2 draw away to Perth Glory.

== International career ==
Loke was first called up for the New Zealand U20's for the 2024 OFC U-19 Men's Championship. He made his debut in the opening group game against New Caledonia on 6 July 2024. On 12 July 2024, Loke captained the side for the first time as New Zealand beat Papua New Guinea 10–0.

Loke was named as part of the 21-player New Zealand U20 squad for the 2025 FIFA U-20 World Cup that took place in Chile from September to October 2025. Loke made three appearances and scored one goal in the tournament, with New Zealand exiting after the conclusion of the group stage.

== Career statistics ==
=== Club ===
As of match played on 18 October 2025.

Appearances and goals by club, season and competition
Club	Season	League			Cup		Others		Total	
Club	Season	Division	Apps	Goals	Apps	Goals	Apps	Goals	Apps	Goals
Western Suburbs	2021	National League	3	0	0	0	—		3	0
Lower Hutt City	2022	National League	16	2	2	0	—		18	2
Wellington Phoenix Reserves	2023	National League	13	0	—		—		13	0
Wellington Phoenix Reserves	2024	National League	21	4	1	0	—		22	4
Wellington Phoenix Reserves	2025	National League	8	1	0	0	—		8	1
Wellington Phoenix Reserves	Total		42	5	1	0	—		43	5
Wellington Phoenix	2024–25	A-League Men	0	0	1	0	—		1	0
Wellington Phoenix	2025–26	A-League Men	1	0	3	0	—		4	0
Wellington Phoenix	Total		1	0	4	0	—		5	0
Career total			60	6	4	0	0	0	64	6

== Honours ==
New Zealand U20

- OFC U-19 Championship: 2024
