= Corban Piper =

New Zealand footballer (born 2002)

- Piper playing for the Wellington Phoenix in 2026.

Personal information
- Full name: Corban Dallas Piper
- Date of birth: 10 September 2002 (age 24)
- Place of birth: Auckland, New Zealand
- Height: 1.88 m (6 ft 2 in)
- Positions: Centre-back; defensive midfielder; striker

Team information
- Current team: Wellington Phoenix
- Number: 99

Youth career
- Hibiscus Coast AFC
- –2020: Birkenhead United
- 2019: → Auckland City

Senior career*
Years	Team	Apps	(Gls)
2021–2022	Birkenhead United	31	(3)
2023	Wexford	35	(0)
2024	Birkenhead United	19	(7)
2024–	Wellington Phoenix Reserves	3	(0)
2024–	Wellington Phoenix	51	(10)

International career^{‡}
2026–	New Zealand	1	(0)
- * Club domestic league appearances and goals as of 5 November 2026 ‡ National team caps and goals as of 12 November 2026

Corban Dallas Piper (born 10 September 2002) is a New Zealand professional footballer who plays as a centre-back, defensive midfielder or striker for A-League Men club Wellington Phoenix and the New Zealand national team.

== Personal life ==
Piper grew up on the Whangaparāoa Peninsula, Auckland. He played youth football for Hibiscus Coast AFC.

== Club career ==
Piper played for Birkenhead United from 2021 to 2024, where he played as an attacking midfielder and scored 10 goals in 51 appearances in the New Zealand National League.

He played in the League of Ireland First Division in 2023 for Wexford. Piper made 35 appearances to help the club to a fourth place finish. In 2024, he returned to Birkenhead United in New Zealand.

In September 2024, just before the A-League transfer window closed, the Wellington Phoenix signed Piper from Birkenhead United. Phoenix coach Giancarlo Italiano signed him for his ability as a centre-back. Piper scored his first A-League Men goal in a 2–1 home defeat against Adelaide United on 11 January 2025.

In May 2025, Piper was awarded the Wellington Phoenix best U-23 player award. Piper won the award alongside Manaia Elliott of the Wellington Phoenix Women.

== International career ==
Piper was called up to the senior New Zealand national team on 3 November 2026 for a two-match home series against India. On 12 November, alongside fellow Wellington Phoenix players Matthew Sheridan and Nathan Walker, Piper made his debut in a 5–0 win against India at Go Media Stadium, Auckland.

== Career statistics ==
=== Club ===
As of match played 5 November 2026.

Appearances and goals by club, season and competition
Club	Season	League			Cup		Other		Total	
Club	Season	Division	Apps	Goals	Apps	Goals	Apps	Goals	Apps	Goals
Birkenhead United	2021	National League	8	0	1	0	—		9	0
Birkenhead United	2022	National League	23	3	2	0	—		25	3
Birkenhead United	Total		31	3	3	0	0	0	34	3
Wexford	2023	LOI First Division	30	0	3	0	2 (Note: One appearance in the League of Ireland First Division play-offs; one appearance in Leinster Senior Cup)	0	35	0
Birkenhead United	2024	National League	20	7	4	1	—		24	7
Wellington Phoenix Reserves	2024	National League	3	0	0	0	—		3	0
Wellington Phoenix Reserves	2025	National League	1	0	0	0	—		1	0
Wellington Phoenix Reserves	Total		4	0	0	0	0	0	4	0
Wellington Phoenix	2024–25	A-League Men	22	3	0	0	—		22	3
Wellington Phoenix	2025–26	A-League Men	26	4	0	0	—		26	4
Wellington Phoenix	2026–27	A-League Men	3	3	—		—		3	3
Wellington Phoenix	Total		51	10	0	0	0	0	51	10
Career total			136	20	10	1	2	0	148	20

== Honours ==
Individual

- Wellington Phoenix Under-23 Player of the Year: 2024–25
