= Lukas Kelly-Heald =

New Zealand footballer (born 2005)

- Kelly-Heald playing for Wellington Phoenix in 2026.

Personal information
- Full name: Lukas Eric Kelly-Heald
- Date of birth: 18 March 2005 (age 21)
- Place of birth: Wellington, New Zealand
- Height: 1.98 m (6 ft 6 in)
- Position: Defender

Team information
- Current team: Wellington Phoenix
- Number: 18

Youth career
- Island Bay United
- North Wellington AFC
- Lower Hutt City AFC

Senior career*
Years	Team	Apps	(Gls)
2021	Lower Hutt City AFC	1	(0)
2021–	Wellington Phoenix Reserves	36	(0)
2023–	Wellington Phoenix	59	(0)

International career^{‡}
2022–2025	New Zealand U-20	10	(0)
2023–	New Zealand U-23	6	(0)
2024–	New Zealand	5	(0)
Medal record
Men's football
Representing New Zealand
OFC Nations Cup
Winner	2024 Fiji/Vanuatu
OFC U-19 Championship
Winner	2022 Tahiti
- * Club domestic league appearances and goals as of 24 April 2026 ‡ National team caps and goals as of 23 January 2026

Lukas Eric Kelly-Heald (born 18 March 2005) is a New Zealand professional footballer who plays as a centre-back or left-back for Wellington Phoenix and the New Zealand national team.

His twin brother Alby Kelly-Heald, a goalkeeper, played for the same youth clubs and the Phoenix academy. In January 2025, they became the third pair of twins to play together in the A-League Men, and the first for the Phoenix.

== Early career ==
Kelly-Heald attended St Patrick's College, Wellington where he played for the first XI.

== Club career ==
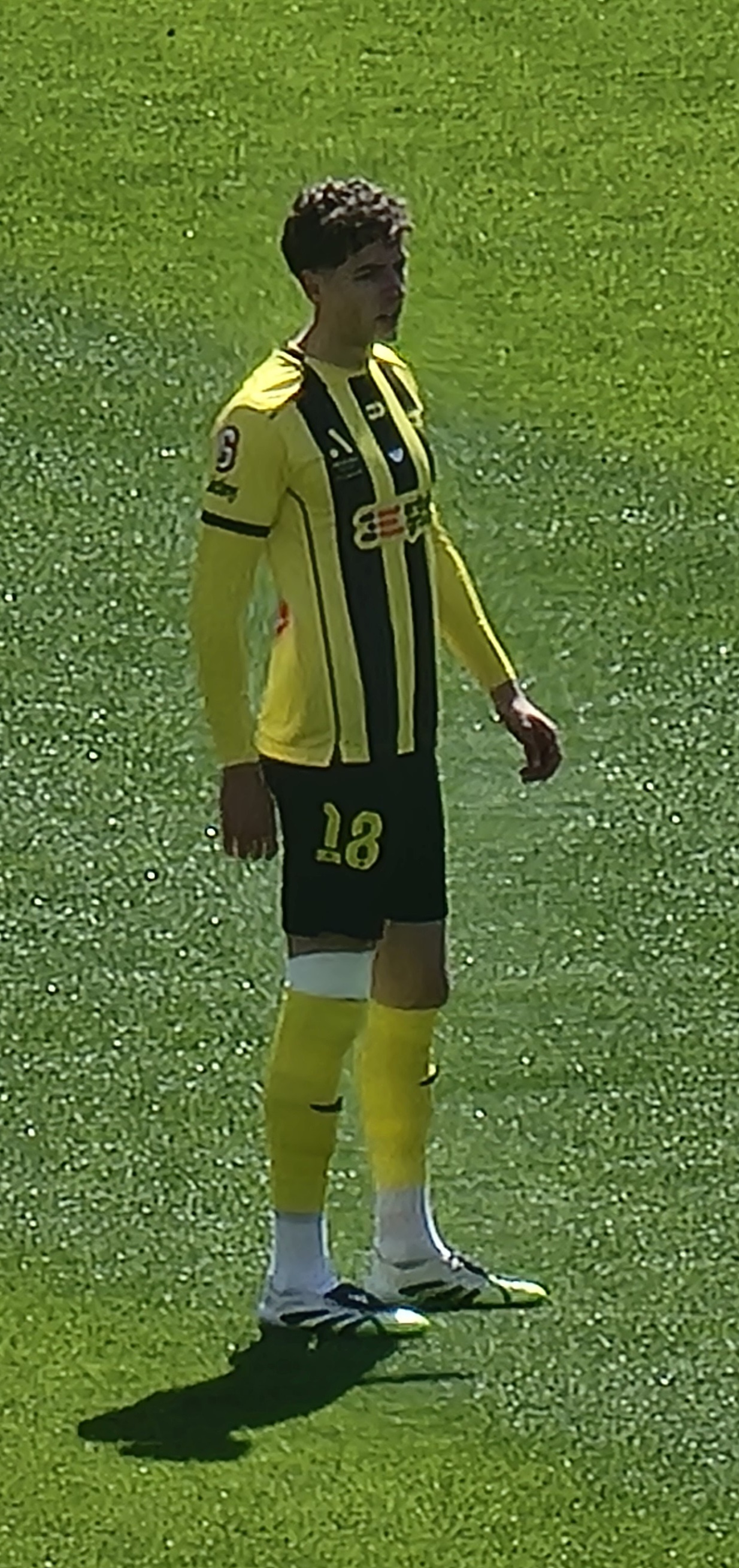
Kelly-Heald playing for the Wellington Phoenix in 2025.

In July 2023, the Wellington Phoenix signed Kelly-Heald to a four-year professional contract. He made his club debut on 4 August 2023 against Peninsula Power FC in the Australia Cup.

Kelly-Heald made his A-League Men debut for the Phoenix on the opening matchday of the 2023–24 season in a 0–0 draw away to Western Sydney Wanderers. He made his 50th league appearance for the Phoenix in a 3–0 win away to the Brisbane Roar on 3 January 2026.

== International career ==
=== New Zealand U-20 ===
Kelly-Heald was named as part of the 23-player New Zealand U-19 squad for the 2022 OFC U-19 Championship. New Zealand would go on to win the tournament by defeating Fiji 3–0 in the final on 24 September 2022. Kelly-Heald made four appearances in the tournament, including the semifinal and final.

Kelly-Heald was named as part of the 21-player New Zealand U-20 squad for the 2025 FIFA U-20 World Cup that took place in Chile from September to October 2025. Kelly-Heald made three appearances in the tournament, with New Zealand exiting after the conclusion of the group stage.

=== New Zealand ===
Kelly-Heald formed part of the New Zealand squad for the 2024 OFC Men's Nations Cup. He made his debut on 18 June 2024 in a group stage match against the Solomon Islands in a 3–0 win, coming on for Tim Payne in the 75th minute. New Zealand would go on to win the Nations Cup, defeating Vanuatu 3–0 in the final on 30 June. Kelly-Heald was substituted on in the 88th minute of the final, and made three appearances overall in the tournament.

== Honours ==
New Zealand U19

- OFC U-19 Men's Championship: 2022.

New Zealand

- OFC Men's Nations Cup: 2024.
