= Nathan Walker (footballer) =

New Zealand footballer (born 2006)

- Walker playing for the Wellington Phoenix in 2026.

Personal information
- Full name: Nathan Barry Walker
- Date of birth: 30 January 2006 (age 20)
- Place of birth: Auckland, New Zealand
- Height: 1.78 m (5 ft 10 in)
- Position: Winger

Team information
- Current team: Wellington Phoenix
- Number: 17

Youth career
- Bucklands Beach AFC
- Onehunga Sports
- 2020–2021: Auckland United

Senior career*
Years	Team	Apps	(Gls)
2022–2023	Fencibles United	24	(5)
2024–	Wellington Phoenix FC Reserves	16	(4)
2024–	Wellington Phoenix	26	(2)

International career^{‡}
2023	New Zealand U17	3	(0)
2024–	New Zealand U20	4	(1)
2026–	New Zealand	1	(0)
Medal record
Men's football
Representing New Zealand
OFC U-19 Men's Championship
Winner	2024 Samoa
- * Club domestic league appearances and goals as of 31 October 2026 ‡ National team caps and goals as of 29 December 2024

Nathan Barry Walker (born 30 January 2006) is a New Zealand professional footballer who plays as a winger for A-League Men club Wellington Phoenix and the New Zealand national team.

== Early life ==
Walker was born in Auckland in 2006. His father is former New Zealand international cricketer Brooke Walker. Walker played for Bucklands Beach AFC, Onehunga Sports, Auckland United, and Fencibles United before joining the Wellington Phoenix Academy in early 2024. He was educated at Macleans College.

== Club career ==
Walker playing for the Wellington Phoenix in October 2026.

After joining the Phoenix Academy, Walker made 16 appearances and scored four goals for the Wellington Phoenix Reserves in the 2024 Central League.

He made his senior Wellington Phoenix debut in an Australia Cup match against South Melbourne on 6 August 2024. The Phoenix lost 1–0 at Lakeside Stadium, Melbourne.

Walker was unexpectedly called up to play his first A-League Men match on 20 October 2024 in a home match against Western United. Sam Sutton, Marco Rojas, Gabriel Sloane-Rodrigues and Stefan Colakovski were all unavailable to play, leading Phoenix manager Giancarlo Italiano to call up Walker to debut for the season opener. The match ended in a 1–1 draw. On 31 October 2024, Walker signed a 4-year contract with the club, the first two of which are on scholarship terms.

== International career ==
=== New Zealand U17 ===
Walker played in the 2023 FIFA U-17 World Cup for New Zealand, playing in all three matches.

=== New Zealand U20 ===
In 2024, Walker was called up to the New Zealand under-19 squad to play in the OFC U-19 Men's Championship. Walker played in four of the five matches, scoring one goal against Papua New Guinea, and winning the championship.

Walker was named as part of the 21-player New Zealand U-20 squad for the 2025 FIFA U-20 World Cup that took place in Chile from September to October 2025. Walker made three appearances and scored one goal in the tournament, with New Zealand exiting after the conclusion of the group stage.

=== New Zealand ===
Walker was called up to the senior New Zealand national team on 3 November 2026 for a two-match home series against India. On 12 November, alongside fellow Wellington Phoenix players Corban Piper and Matthew Sheridan, Walker made his debut in a 5–0 win against India at Go Media Stadium, Auckland.

== Honours ==
New Zealand U20

- OFC U-19 Men's Championship: 2024
