= Matthew Sheridan =

New Zealand footballer (born 2004)

- Sheridan playing for the Wellington Phoenix in 2026.

Personal information
- Full name: Matthew Benjamin Sheridan
- Date of birth: 9 May 2004 (age 22)
- Place of birth: New Zealand
- Height: 1.78 m (5 ft 10 in)
- Position: Midfielder

Team information
- Current team: Wellington Phoenix
- Number: 27

Youth career
- Halswell United
- Selwyn United

Senior career*
Years	Team	Apps	(Gls)
2019–	Wellington Phoenix Reserves	45	(3)
2023–	Wellington Phoenix	53	(0)

International career^{‡}
2023–	New Zealand U23	2	(0)
2026–	New Zealand	1	(0)
- * Club domestic league appearances and goals as of 17 April 2026 ‡ National team caps and goals as of 12 November 2026

Matthew Benjamin Sheridan (born 9 May 2004) is a New Zealand footballer who plays as a midfielder for Wellington Phoenix and the New Zealand national team.

== Club career ==
=== Youth career ===
Sheridan played for both Halswell United and Selwyn United at youth level, before joining the Phoenix academy in 2019.

=== Wellington Phoenix ===
Sheridan playing for the Wellington Phoenix in 2026.

On 19 December 2023, Sheridan signed a scholarship contract with the Wellington Phoenix. Sheridan made his debut for Wellington on 25 November 2023 in a 1–0 win over Melbourne City.

== International career ==
=== New Zealand U23 ===
Sheridan was called up for the New Zealand U23 for the 2023 OFC Men's Olympic Qualifying Tournament. He made his debut on 6 September 2023, in the semi-final as a half-time substitute against Vanuatu.

=== New Zealand ===
Sheridan was called up to the senior New Zealand national team on 3 November 2026 for a two-match home series against India. On 12 November, alongside fellow Wellington Phoenix players Corban Piper and Nathan Walker, Sheridan made his debut in a 5–0 win against India at Go Media Stadium, Auckland.

== Career statistics ==
=== Club ===
As of match played on 6 April 2024.

Appearances and goals by club, season and competition
Club	Season	League			Cup		Others		Total	
Club	Season	Division	Apps	Goals	Apps	Goals	Apps	Goals	Apps	Goals
Wellington Phoenix Reserves	2022	National League	26	1	—		—		26	1
Wellington Phoenix Reserves	2023	National League	18	2	—		—		18	2
Wellington Phoenix Reserves	2024	National League	0	0	0	0	—		0	0
Wellington Phoenix Reserves	Total		44	3	0	0	—		44	3
Wellington Phoenix	2023–24	A-League Men	4	0	0	0	0	0	4	0
Career total			48	0	0	0	0	0	48	0

== Honours ==
New Zealand U23

- OFC Men's Olympic Qualifying Tournament: 2023
