= Alby Kelly-Heald =

New Zealand footballer

- Kelly-Heald playing for the Wellington Phoenix in 2026.

Personal information
- Full name: Albert Otto Kelly-Heald
- Date of birth: 18 March 2005 (age 21)
- Place of birth: Wellington, New Zealand
- Height: 1.96 m (6 ft 5 in)
- Position: Goalkeeper

Team information
- Current team: Wellington Phoenix
- Number: 30

Youth career
- Island Bay United
- North Wellington
- Wellington Phoenix

Senior career*
Years	Team	Apps	(Gls)
2022–2024	Wellington Phoenix B	50	(0)
2024–	Wellington Phoenix	8	(0)

International career
2023–	New Zealand U20	5	(0)
- * Club domestic league appearances and goals as of 8 March 2025

Albert Otto Kelly-Heald (born 18 March 2005) is a New Zealand footballer who plays as a goalkeeper for A-League Men club Wellington Phoenix.

== Club career ==
Born in Wellington, Kelly-Heald played youth football for Island Bay United and North Wellington alongside his twin brother, defender Lukas. The brothers then joined the academy of Wellington Phoenix, with Alby becoming first-choice goalkeeper for the reserve team in the New Zealand National League.

In December 2023, Kelly-Heald signed a scholarship deal with the Phoenix until the end of the 2026–27 season, joining his brother in the first team. He made his debut on 6 August in the last 32 of the Australia Cup, a 1–0 loss away to South Melbourne of the National Premier Leagues Victoria; his team had a record low starting average age of 20.8 due to the recent transfers of several players and others being at the Olympic tournament in France.

Kelly-Heald signed a new contract in September 2024, making his existing deal fully professional. On 15 January 2025, he made his A-League Men debut at home to Sydney FC, as manager Giancarlo Italiano had dropped Josh Oluwayemi for having made mistakes in the two previous matches. Kelly-Heald faced the league's leading goalscorer Joe Lolley, and made five saves in a goalless draw; he and his brother became the third set of twins to play in the A-League, and the first for the Phoenix.

== International career ==
Kelly-Heald played four of five games as the New Zealand under-19 team won the 2024 OFC U-19 Men's Championship. He did not concede a goal during the tournament in Samoa, which ended with a 4–0 final win over New Caledonia, and he was awarded the Golden Gloves for best goalkeeper.

Kelly-Heald was called up for the under-23 team in the Oceanian qualifiers for the 2024 Olympic tournament. Alex Paulsen played in goal as the team beat Fiji 9–0 in the final to make the tournament in France.
