= Kazuki Nagasawa =

Japanese footballer

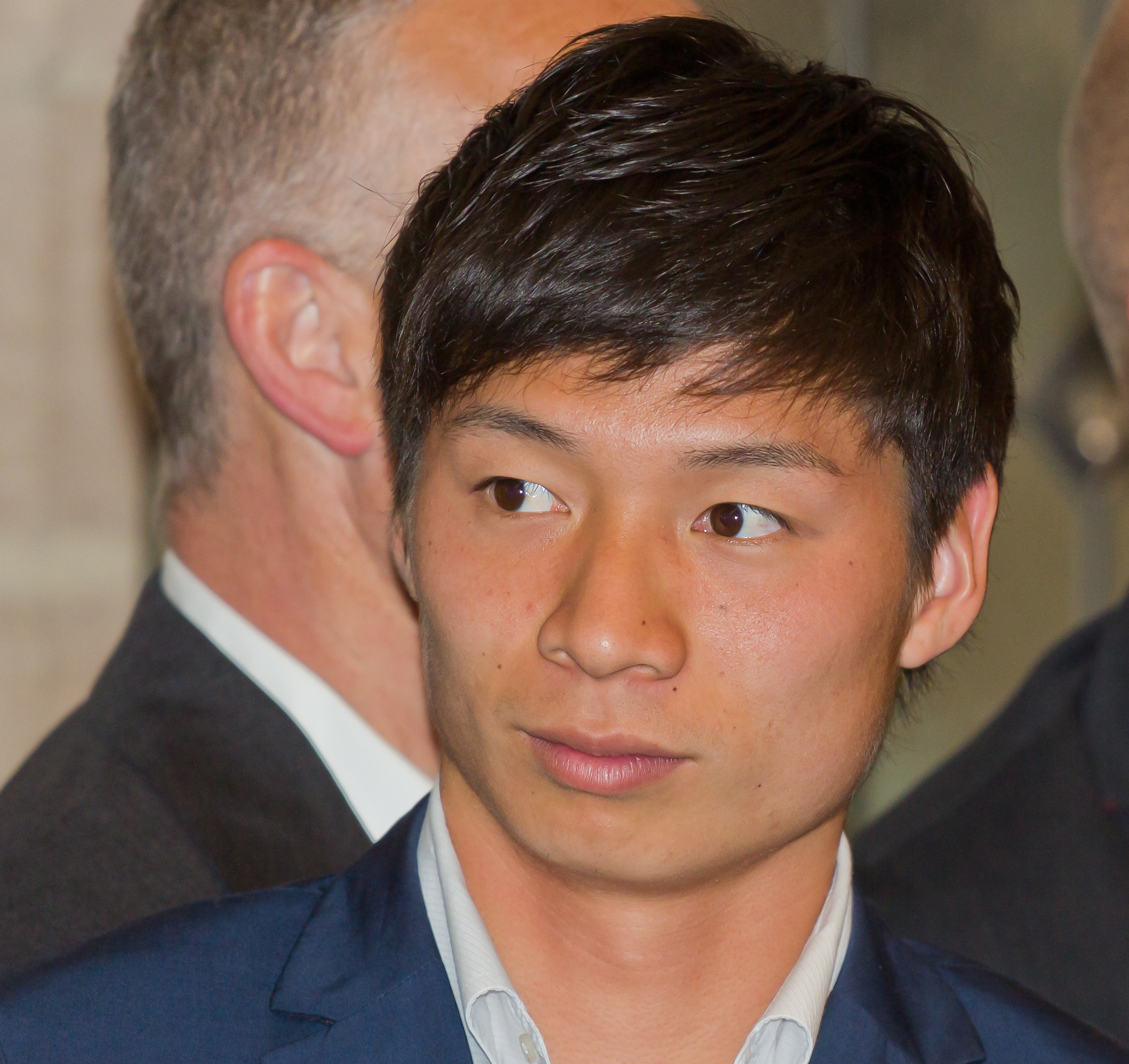
- Nagasawa in 2014

Personal information
- Full name: Kazuki Nagasawa
- Date of birth: 16 December 1991 (age 34)
- Place of birth: Chiba, Japan
- Height: 1.73 m (5 ft 8 in)
- Position: Midfielder

Team information
- Current team: Wellington Phoenix
- Number: 25

Youth career
- 2007–2009: Yachiyo High School

College career
Years	Team	Apps	(Gls)
2010–2013	Senshu University		

Senior career*
Years	Team	Apps	(Gls)
2013	Yokohama F. Marinos	0	(0)
2014–2015	1. FC Köln	21	(0)
2014–2015	→ 1. FC Köln II	3	(0)
2016–2021	Urawa Red Diamonds	92	(7)
2016	→ JEF United Chiba (loan)	41	(4)
2021–2023	Nagoya Grampus	46	(0)
2023–2024	Vegalta Sendai	40	(1)
2024–	Wellington Phoenix	48	(4)

International career
2017	Japan	1	(0)
Medal record
Yokohama F. Marinos
Runner-up	J1 League	2013
Winner	Emperor's Cup	2013
Urawa Reds
Winner	AFC Champions League	2017
Winner	Emperor's Cup	2018
- * Club domestic league appearances and goals as of 17 April 2026

Kazuki Nagasawa (長澤 和輝, Nagasawa Kazuki; pronounced [na̠ɡa̠za̠wa̠ ka̠zɯ̟ᵝkʲi]; born 16 December 1991) is a Japanese professional footballer who plays as a midfielder for A-League club Wellington Phoenix.

== Career ==
Nagasawa playing for the Wellington Phoenix in 2026

Nagasawa made his debut for Yokohama F. Marinos on 3 April 2013 in the J. League Cup against Omiya Ardija in which he came on in the 76th minute as Yokohama lost the match 1–0.

=== 1. FC Köln ===
On 23 December 2013 it was confirmed that Nagasawa had signed for German side 1. FC Köln after a trial period. He made his debut for Köln in the league on 9 February 2014 against SC Paderborn. He came on in the 68th minute for Mišo Brečko as Koln lost 0–1.

== Career statistics ==
=== Club ===
As of 19 July 2022

Club	Season	League			Cup		League Cup		International		Other^{1}		Total	
Club	Season	Division	Apps	Goals	Apps	Goals	Apps	Goals	Apps	Goals	Apps	Goals	Apps	Goals
Yokohama F. Marinos	2013	J1 League	0	0	0	0	1	0	0	0	–		1	0
Köln	2013–14	2. Bundesliga	10	0	0	0	–		–		–		10	0
Köln	2014–15	Bundesliga	10	0	2	0	–		–		–		12	0
Köln	2015–16	Bundesliga	1	0	1	0	–		–		–		2	0
JEF United Chiba	2016	J2 League	41	4	3	1	–		–		–		44	5
Urawa Red Diamonds	2017	J1 League	8	1	3	0	1	0	5	0	3	0	20	1
Urawa Red Diamonds	2018	J1 League	27	2	5	0	7	0	–		–		39	2
Urawa Red Diamonds	2019	J1 League	30	3	0	0	1	0	12	1	1	0	44	4
Urawa Red Diamonds	2020	J1 League	27	1	–		1	0	–		–		28	1
Nagoya Grampus	2021	J1 League	32	0	3	1	5	0	6	0	–		46	1
Nagoya Grampus	2022	J1 League	4	0	0	0	4	0	–		–		8	0
Career total			190	11	17	2	20	0	23	1	4	0	254	14

^{1}Includes Japanese Super Cup, Suruga Bank Championship and FIFA Club World Cup.

=== International ===
Japan national team
Year	Apps	Goals
2017	1	0
Total	1	0

== Honours ==
1. FC Köln

- 2. Bundesliga: 2013–14

Urawa Red Diamonds

- AFC Champions League: 2017
- Emperor's Cup: 2018

Nagoya Grampus

- J.League Cup: 2021
