= Tim Payne (footballer) =

New Zealand footballer (born 1994)

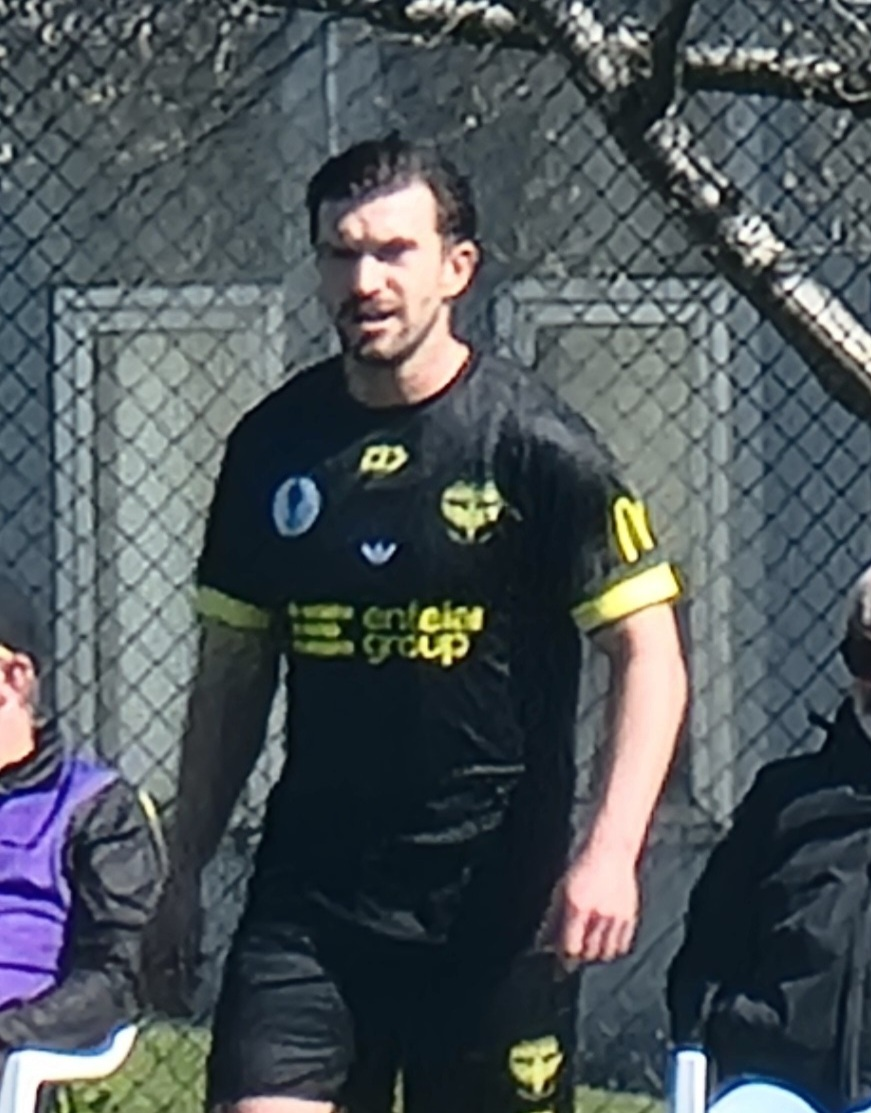
- Payne in 2025

Personal information
- Full name: Timothy John Payne
- Date of birth: 10 January 1994 (age 32)
- Place of birth: Auckland, New Zealand
- Height: 1.79 m (5 ft 10 in)
- Positions: Midfielder; defender

Team information
- Current team: Olimpia
- Number: 4

Youth career
- Auckland City

Senior career*
Years	Team	Apps	(Gls)
2009–2010	Auckland City	1	(1)
2010–2012	Waitakere United	7	(0)
2012–2014	Blackburn Rovers	0	(0)
2014–2015	Auckland City	10	(1)
2015–2016	Portland Timbers 2	22	(0)
2016–2019	Eastern Suburbs	51	(2)
2019–2026	Wellington Phoenix	143	(4)
2026–	Olimpia	7	(1)

International career^{‡}
2011	New Zealand U17	9	(4)
2011–2013	New Zealand U20	4	(0)
2012	New Zealand U23	2	(0)
2012–	New Zealand	54	(3)
Medal record
Men's football
Representing New Zealand
OFC Nations Cup
Winner	2024 Fiji/Vanuatu
Third place	2012 Solomon Islands
- * Club domestic league appearances and goals as of 8 October 2026 ‡ National team caps and goals as of 27 June 2026

Timothy John Payne (born 10 January 1994) is a New Zealand professional footballer who plays as a defender for División de Honor club Olimpia and the New Zealand national team.

A noted utility player, Payne has played almost every outfield position during his career.

== Club career ==
=== Auckland City and Waitakere United ===
Born in Auckland, Payne attended Sacred Heart College and started his youth career with ASB Premiership club Auckland City before switching to play for rivals Waitakere United. Payne played a major role in Waitakere United's success in the ASB National Youth League in 2010.

=== Blackburn Rovers ===
After impressing at the 2011 FIFA U-17 World Cup Payne trialled with Premier League side Blackburn Rovers and then spent several months training at the club. Days after celebrating his 18th birthday Payne signed a two-and-a-half-year contract with Rovers in January 2012. Due to work permit issues that prevented him from playing for Rovers, he was released at the end of his contract.

=== Wellington Phoenix ===
In July 2019, Payne signed a one-year contract with A-League side Wellington Phoenix. Payne made his A-League debut for the Phoenix in the first match of the 2019–20 season in a 0–1 defeat against Western United on 13 October 2019 — Payne was substituted in for Louis Fenton in the 68th minute. On 3 January 2020, it was announced that Payne had signed a two-year contract extension with the Phoenix. On 10 June 2020, Payne pleaded guilty to a drink-driving charge after a shirtless late-night joy ride in a golf cart in Sydney while the team was supposed to be in self-isolation. He was subsequently ordered by the court to pay a AUS$700 fine.

On 4 November 2023, in his 93rd appearance for the Phoenix, Payne scored his first goal for the club following an overlapping run and a well-taken finish with his weaker left foot. The Phoenix defeated Brisbane Roar 5–2 at Sky Stadium, Wellington. Payne scored a career-high 3 goals in 23 appearances during the 2023–24 season.

During the 2024–25 season, Payne made 20 appearances in the league. He scored one goal during the season, scoring in a 2–0 win against Perth Glory at HBF Park, Perth, on 26 October 2024. On 17 December 2024, Payne signed a new three-year contract with the Phoenix, until the end of the 2027–28 season.

In the 2025–26 season, Payne made 14 appearances in the A-League Men and 2 appearances in the Australia Cup. On 26 October 2025, Payne suffered a broken collarbone in a 2–1 win against the Brisbane Roar in Wellington.

=== Club Olimpia ===
On 19 June 2026, the Wellington Phoenix announced that they had accepted an undisclosed transfer fee for Payne from Paraguayan División de Honor side Olimpia. The transfer fee is believed to be in the vicinity of $500,000.

On 14 July 2026, Payne officially joined Olimpia. Payne made his debut for the club on 2 August, coming on as a substitute for Raúl Cáceres in a 5–0 win over Rubio Ñu. He scored his first goal for the club during the match.

== International career ==
Payne represented New Zealand at under-17 level. He played 90 minutes in each of his sides four matches at the 2011 FIFA U-17 World Cup in Mexico.

In May 2012, Payne received a call-up from Ricki Herbert to the senior national team alongside fellow youngster and under-17 teammate Cameron Howieson. He made his first appearance in a 1–0 win against Honduras on 26 May 2012, coming on as a substitute for Leo Bertos and playing the final 15 minutes of the match. He subsequently made an appearance off the bench in the 2012 OFC Nations Cup. Payne was named in New Zealand's team for the 2012 Olympics.

On 30 March 2026, Payne received his 50th cap for New Zealand in a 4–1 win over Chile as part of the 2026 FIFA Series. With this win, New Zealand achieved their first ever win against a South American national team.

On 14 May 2026, Payne was announced to be in the All Whites squad for the 2026 FIFA World Cup.

== Personal life ==
On 28 May 2026, he became the target of a viral social media campaign by Argentinian influencer Valen Scarsini, who directed his followers to support Payne specifically as the "least known" player at the 2026 World Cup. As a result, Payne's Instagram follower count grew from under 5,000 to more than 550,000 in less than a day. Within three days, he had reached more than 3.2 million followers, making his Instagram account the most followed football-related page from New Zealand. In response, Payne posted a video thanking Valen and his new fans for his newfound fame, saying, "I just wanted to also express that I'm very grateful to be representing my country and I appreciate all the love from all around the world".

On 3 June, Scarsini attended New Zealand's World Cup warm-up friendly against Haiti, and met Payne at New Zealand's training camp the following morning, where he was gifted a jersey from Payne. As of July 2026, Payne has 5.5 million followers on his Instagram, making him the second-most followed New Zealand athlete behind Israel Adesanya.

== Career statistics ==
=== Club ===
As of match played 4 November 2026

Appearances and goals by club, season and competition
Club	Season	League			National cup (Note: Includes U.S. Open Cup, Australia Cup)		Continental		Other		Total	
Club	Season	Division	Apps	Goals	Apps	Goals	Apps	Goals	Apps	Goals	Apps	Goals
Auckland City	2009–10	NZ Premiership	1	1	—		—		—		1	1
Waitakere United	2010–11	NZ Premiership	6	0	—		1 (Note: Appearance in OFC Champions League)	0	2 (Note: Appearances in New Zealand Football Championship play-offs)	0	9	0
Blackburn Rovers	2011–12	Premier League	0	0	0	0	—		—		0	0
Blackburn Rovers	2012–13	Championship	0	0	0	0	—		—		0	0
Blackburn Rovers	2013–14	Championship	0	0	0	0	—		—		0	0
Blackburn Rovers	Total		0	0	0	0	0	0	0	0	0	0
Auckland City	2014–15	NZ Premiership	10	1	—		1 (Note: Appearance in OFC President's Cup)	0	5 (Note: One appearance in Charity Cup, four appearances in FIFA Club World Cup)	0	16	1
Portland Timbers 2	2015	USL Pro	21	0	2	0	—		—		23	0
Eastern Suburbs	2016–17	NZ Premiership	16	1	—		—		—		16	1
Eastern Suburbs	2017–18	NZ Premiership	16	1	—		—		—		16	1
Eastern Suburbs	2018–19	NZ Premiership	17	0	—		—		2	0	19	0
Eastern Suburbs	Total		49	2	0	0	0	0	2	0	51	2
Wellington Phoenix	2019–20	A-League Men	16	0	1	0	—		0	0	17	0
Wellington Phoenix	2020–21	A-League Men	19	0	—		—		—		19	0
Wellington Phoenix	2021–22	A-League Men	23	0	1	0	—		1 (Note: Appearances in A-League Men finals series)	0	25	0
Wellington Phoenix	2022–23	A-League Men	23	0	2	0	—		1	0	26	0
Wellington Phoenix	2023–24	A-League Men	23	3	2	0	—		2	0	27	3
Wellington Phoenix	2024–25	A-League Men	20	1	0	0	—		—		20	1
Wellington Phoenix	2025–26	A-League Men	14	0	2	0	—		—		16	0
Wellington Phoenix	Total		138	4	8	0	0	0	4	0	150	4
Olimpia	2026	División de Honor	9	1	0	0	0	0	—		9	1
Career total			233	9	10	0	2	0	13	0	259	9

=== International ===
As of 26 June 2026

Appearances and goals by national team and year
National team	Year	Apps	Goals
New Zealand	2012	7	0
New Zealand	2013	2	2
New Zealand	2014	5	0
New Zealand	2015	1	0
New Zealand	2016	0	0
New Zealand	2017	0	0
New Zealand	2018	4	0
New Zealand	2019	2	0
New Zealand	2020	0	0
New Zealand	2021	0	0
New Zealand	2022	9	0
New Zealand	2023	5	0
New Zealand	2024	7	0
New Zealand	2025	6	1
New Zealand	2026	6	0
Total		54	3

Scores and results list New Zealand's goal tally first, score column indicates score after each Payne goal.

List of international goals scored by Tim Payne
No.	Date	Venue	Opponent	Score	Result	Competition	Ref.
1	26 March 2013	Lawson Tama Stadium, Honiara, Solomon Islands	Solomon Islands	1–0	2–0	2014 FIFA World Cup qualification	
2	26 March 2013	Lawson Tama Stadium, Honiara, Solomon Islands	Solomon Islands	2–0	2–0	2014 FIFA World Cup qualification	
3	21 March 2025	Sky Stadium, Wellington, New Zealand	Fiji	4–0	7–0	2026 FIFA World Cup qualification	

== Honours ==
Auckland City

- New Zealand Championship: 2014–15
- New Zealand Premiership: 2009–10, 2014–15
- FIFA Club World Cup Third Place: 2014

Waitakere United

- New Zealand Championship: 2010–11
- New Zealand Premiership: 2010–11

Blackburn Rovers

- Premier League Asia Trophy Third Place: 2011

Eastern Suburbs

- New Zealand Championship: 2018–19

New Zealand

- FIFA Series runner-up: 2026
- OFC Nations Cup: 2024
- OFC U-17 Championship: 2011

Individual

- PFA A-League Team of the Season: 2023–24
- A-Leagues All Star: 2024
