= Josh Oluwayemi =

English footballer (born 2001)

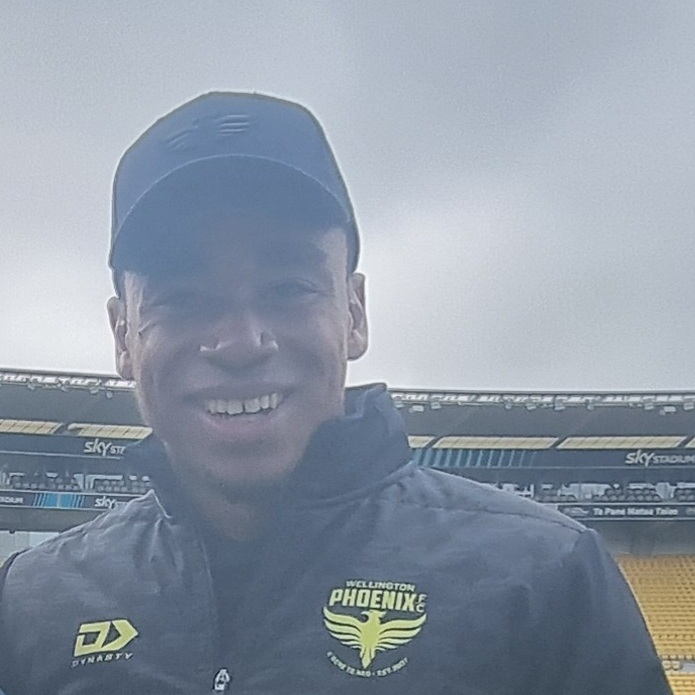
- Oluwayemi of the Wellington Phoenix in 2026.

Personal information
- Full name: Oluwaferanmi Joshua Chibuzo Oluwayemi
- Date of birth: 13 March 2001 (age 25)
- Place of birth: Waltham Forest, England
- Height: 6 ft 0 in (1.83 m)
- Position: Goalkeeper

Youth career
- 2011–2020: Tottenham Hotspur

Senior career*
Years	Team	Apps	(Gls)
2020–2022	Tottenham Hotspur	0	(0)
2020	→ Maidenhead United (loan)	1	(0)
2022–2024	Portsmouth	4	(0)
2023	→ Chelmsford City (loan)	19	(0)
2024	Lahti	13	(0)
2024–2026	Wellington Phoenix	34	(0)

International career
- England U15
- England U16
- * Club domestic league appearances and goals as of 17:50, 16 April 2026 (UTC)

Oluwaferanmi Joshua Chibuzo Oluwayemi (born 13 March 2001) is an English professional footballer who plays as a goalkeeper.

== Club career ==
Born in Waltham Forest, Oluwayemi joined Tottenham Hotspur's academy at the age of 10, subsequently coming through the club's youth ranks.

In October 2020, he started his senior career by moving on loan to National League club Maidenhead United until January 2021. In the summer of 2022, he was released by Tottenham, without having made any appearances for Spurs.

Following a successful trial at Portsmouth, on 19 July 2022 Oluwayemi joined the EFL League One club on a permanent deal, signing a one-year contract, with an option for another season. He made his league debut for Pompey on 14 January 2023, starting in a 3–0 away loss against Bolton Wanderers.

On 31 July 2023, Oluwayemi signed for National League South club Chelmsford City on loan. In November 2023, following an injury, Oluwayemi returned to Portsmouth early.

On 11 January 2024, after 9 appearances for Portsmouth, Oluwayemi joined Finnish Veikkausliiga club Lahti on a one-year contract. He left Lahti in mid-August, after having recorded 14 appearances for the club.

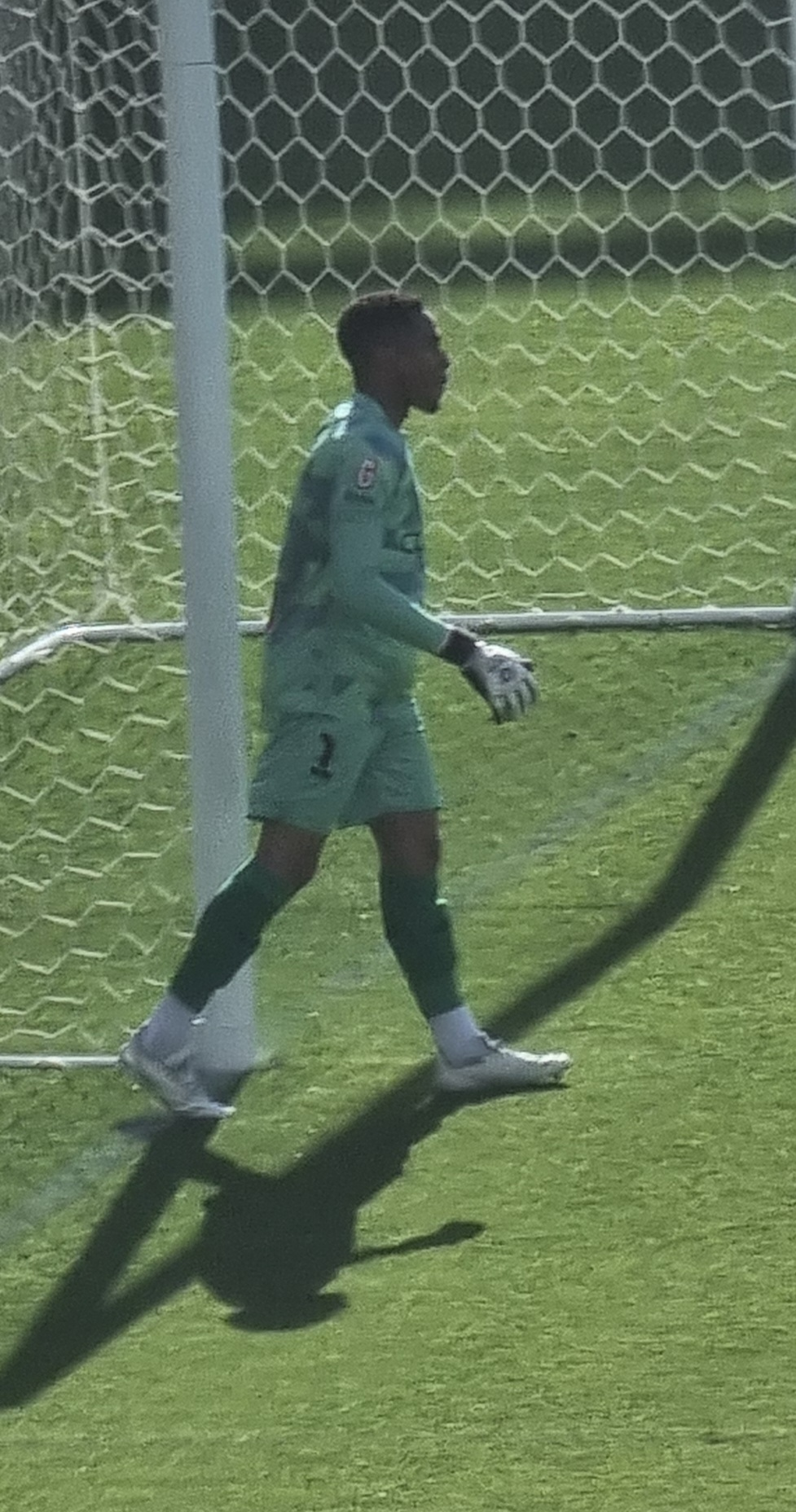
Oluwayemi playing for the Wellington Phoenix in 2024.

On 15 August 2024, Oluwayemi joined Wellington Phoenix, a New Zealand club playing in the Australian top-tier A-League Men, on a one-year deal for an undisclosed fee. On 30 October 2024, Oluwayemi's contract was renewed with the Phoenix for another year, until the end of the 2025–26 season.

On 21 February 2026, Oluwayemi scored an own goal in a 5–0 defeat to rivals Auckland FC after opposition defender Jake Girdwood-Reich cleared the ball from deep inside his own half, with Oluwayemi heading it into his own net from outside his penalty area. The incident attracted significant attention online, with some describing the incident as a contender for "own goal of the year". He conceded three further goals before half-time, leaving his side 4–0 down, and was substituted at the interval for Alby Kelly-Heald. The defeat also led to the resignation of head coach Giancarlo Italiano.

Oluwayemi finished the season as Chris Greenacre's first-choice goalkeeper, starting each of the final eight matches of the campaign, but his high-profile errors against Auckland meant he was not retained past the 2025–26 season, with the club moving away from an import goalkeeper.

On 29 May 2026, the club confirmed Oluwayemi's departure.

== International career ==
Thanks to his dual citizenship, Oluwayemi can choose to represent either England or Nigeria internationally.

Oluwayemi has represented England at under-15 and under-16 level.

In July 2021, Oluwayemi was called up to the senior Nigeria side for a friendly against Mexico.

== Personal life ==
Oluwayemi has a younger brother, Tobi (b. 2003), who also plays as a goalkeeper: he similarly played for Tottenham's youth academy, before joining Celtic in the summer of 2019, and represented England at various youth international levels.

== Career statistics ==
As of 25 April 2026

Appearances and goals by club, season and competition
Club	Season	League			National cup (Note: Includes FA Cup)		League cup (Note: Includes Finnish League Cup)		Other		Total	
Club	Season	Division	Apps	Goals	Apps	Goals	Apps	Goals	Apps	Goals	Apps	Goals
Tottenham Hotspur	2020–21	Premier League	0	0	0	0	0	0	0	0	0	0
Maidenhead United (loan)	2020–21	National League	1	0	0	0	—		1 (Note: Appearance in FA Trophy)	0	2	0
Tottenham Hotspur U21	2021–22	—			—		—		2 (Note: Appearances in EFL Trophy)	0	2	0
Portsmouth	2022–23	League One	4	0	0	0	0	0	5	0	9	0
Chelmsford City (loan)	2023–24	National League South	19	0	2	0	—		1	0	22	0
Lahti	2024	Veikkausliiga	13	0	0	0	1	0	—		14	0
Wellington Phoenix	2024–25	A-League Men	18	0	1	0	—		—		19	0
Wellington Phoenix	2025–26	A-League Men	18	0	2	0	—		—		20	0
Wellington Phoenix	Total		36	0	3	0	0	0	0	0	36	0
Career total			73	0	5	0	1	0	9	0	88	0
