= Wellington Phoenix FC Reserves =

Wellington Phoenix Reserves
- Full name: Wellington Phoenix Football Club Reserves
- Nickname: WeeNix
- Founded: 2014; 12 years ago
- Ground: Fraser Park
- Capacity: 750
- Chairman: Rob Morrison
- Head Coach: Joshua Neff
- League: National League
- 2026: Central League, 9th of 10; National League, TBD
- Website: www.wellingtonphoenix.com
Home colours	Away colours

Wellington Phoenix Football Club Reserves is a football team based in Wellington, New Zealand. They currently serve as the reserve side of the Wellington Phoenix FC of the A-League and compete in the National League.

== History ==
Chart of yearly ladder positions for Wellington Phoenix Reserves in NZ 1st division soccer

From 2010 to 2013, a Wellington Phoenix reserve side took part in the ASB Phoenix Challenge competition against ASB Premiership sides, however these games were separate to the main competition.

On 22 August 2014 it was announced that the club had been granted permission to field a reserve side in the 2014–15 ASB Premiership, the highest level of football in New Zealand. The team made their debut in the competition on 1 November 2014 against Team Wellington. Tyler Boyd scored the first goal in the reserves' history, but that could not prevent them losing 1–2.

On 2 October 2015, Wellington Phoenix named a youth squad to take part in the ASB Youth League.

With the restructuring and creation of a new National League made by New Zealand Football for the 2021 season, a Memorandum of Understanding (MoU) was signed between the Phoenix and Lower Hutt City which saw the team play under in the Central League under the Lower Hutt banner. This meant Lower Hutt could not qualify for the Championship phase even if they finish in the top three of the Central League as Wellington Phoenix would then play that part of the competition.

This changed again for the 2022 season, with the Phoenix allowed to again play in the national league under their own name and colours.

== Players ==
=== Reserves squad ===
As of 28 October 2026

Note: Flags indicate national team as defined under FIFA eligibility rules; some limited exceptions apply. Players may hold more than one non-FIFA nationality.

No.	Pos.	Nation	Player
—	GK	NZL	Joseph Chalabi
—	GK	NZL	Liam McMaster
—	DF	NZL	Marcus Commisso
—	DF	NZL	Jesper Edwards
—	DF	NZL	Kyle Koch
—	DF	NZL	Ryan Lee
—	DF	NZL	Arlie Loughnan
—	DF	NZL	Joe McIntyre
—	DF	NZL	Mac Munro
—	DF	NZL	Daniel Nelson
—	MF	NZL	Riley Allison
—	MF	NZL	Zach Cashmore
—	MF	NZL	Gethyn Foster
—	MF	NZL	George Fullelove

No.	Pos.	Nation	Player
—	MF	NZL	Oliver Grosso
—	MF	NZL	Cailean Hamilton
—	MF	NZL	Phillip Lind Azevedo
—	MF	NZL	Grayson Lunman
—	MF	USA	Jiovanny Mora
—	MF	NZL	Fletcher Pratt
—	MF	NZL	Hayden Thomas (captain)
—	MF	NZL	Dylan Tollervey
—	FW	NZL	Jack Clegg
—	FW	NZL	Willem Des Tombe
—	FW	NZL	Finnbarr Hanrahan
—	FW	NZL	Waisea Henry
—	FW	NZL	Athan Thompson

==== Senior player appearances ====
Up to four professional players are eligible to play for the reserves side from this squad. Two under-20 players are also allowed if the reserves side's opposition agrees to their inclusion on match day.

Note: Flags indicate national team as defined under FIFA eligibility rules; some limited exceptions apply. Players may hold more than one non-FIFA nationality.

No.	Pos.	Nation	Player
5	DF	AUS	Walter Scott
9	FW	MEX	Rafael Durán
15	DF	NZL	Isaac Hughes
19	FW	NZL	Nathan Walker
24	DF	NZL	Xuan Loke
30	GK	NZL	Alby Kelly-Heald

No.	Pos.	Nation	Player
32	MF	NZL	Ben Trenberth
34	DF	NZL	Dylan Gardiner
35	MF	NZL	Luke Mitchell
37	MF	NZL	Anaru Cassidy
39	DF	NZL	Jayden Smith
40	GK	NZL	Eamonn McCarron

== Season by season record ==
=== ISPS Handa Men's Premiership ===
Season	Division	League										Top scorer	
Season	Division	P	W	D	L	F	A	GD	Pts	Pos	Finals	Name	Goals
2014–15	Premiership	16	7	0	9	37	42	−5	21	6th	–	(United States) Tyler Boyd ♦	10
2015–16	Premiership	14	2	1	11	24	46	−22	7	7th	–	(New Zealand) James McGarry	5
2016–17	Premiership	18	6	4	8	25	33	−8	22	7th	–	(New Zealand) Max Mata	5
2017–18	Premiership	18	4	3	11	27	53	−26	15	9th	–	(New Zealand) Logan Rogerson	5
2018–19	Premiership	18	3	2	13	22	46	−24	11	10th	–	(New Zealand) Ben Waine	8
2019–20	Premiership	16	4	6	6	30	32	−2	18	8th	–	(New Zealand) Byron Heath, (New Zealand) Ahmed Othman	5
2020–21	Premiership	14	2	4	8	18	37	−19	10	8th	–	(New Zealand) Riley Bidois	6

=== National League ===
Season	Qualifying league	League									National League									Chatham Cup	Top scorer	
Season	Qualifying league	P	W	D	L	F	A	GD	Pts	Pos	P	W	D	L	F	A	GD	Pts	Pos	Chatham Cup	Name	Goals
2021	Central League	Did not participate (Note: Lower Hutt City cannot qualify for the National League Championship phase due to their MoU with Wellington Phoenix Reserves.)									5	2	0	3	15	8	+7	6	4th	—	(New Zealand) Luis Toomey	5
2022	Central League	18	10	3	5	32	17	+15	33	3rd	9	3	3	3	16	14	+2	12	6th	—	(New Zealand) Josh Rudland	8
2023	Central League	18	12	1	5	47	29	+18	37	2nd	9	3	0	6	19	24	−5	9	8th	—	(New Zealand) Joshua Tollervey	17
2024	Central League	18	7	3	8	34	40	−6	24	5th	9	4	1	4	16	19	−3	13	5th	R2	(New Zealand) Luke Flowerdew	7
2025	Central League	18	8	5	5	44	26	+18	29	4th	10	3	1	6	18	21	−3	10	9th	R2	(New Zealand) Luke Flowerdew	9
2026	Central League	18	2	5	11	17	26	−9	11	9th	In progress									R2		

Season	League	Div	P	W	D	L	GF	GA	GD	Pts	League Position	Chatham Cup	Top scorer	
Season	League	Div	P	W	D	L	GF	GA	GD	Pts	League Position	Chatham Cup	Name	Goals
2027	National League	1									TBD			

	Champions
	Runners-up
	Third Place
	Last Place
–	Did not make the Playoff
♦	Top scorer in competition
EF	Elimination finals
SF	Semi-finals

== See also ==
- A-League Men
- Wellington Phoenix FC (A-League Women)
