= 2023–24 Wellington Phoenix FC season =

Wellington Phoenix
2023–24 season
- Chairman: Rob Morrison
- Manager: Giancarlo Italiano
- Stadium: Sky Stadium
- A-League Men: 2nd
- A-League Men Finals: Semi-final
- Australia Cup: Round of 16
- Top goalscorer: League: Kosta Barbarouses (13); All: Kosta Barbarouses (13)
- Highest home attendance: 18,002 vs. Sydney FC (16 March 2024); A-League Men
- Lowest home attendance: 4,395 vs. Newcastle Jets (9 December 2023); A-League Men
- Average home league attendance: 8,940
- Biggest win: 5–2 vs. Brisbane Roar (H) (4 November 2023); A-League Men; 3–0 vs Macarthur FC (H) (18 December 2023); A-League Men; 3–0 vs Macarthur FC (H) (27 April 2024); A-League Men
- Biggest defeat: 0–3 vs. Melbourne City (A) (27 August 2023); Australia Cup; 0–3 vs. Newcastle Jets (H) (9 December 2023); A-League Men
Home colours	Away colours
- All statistics correct as of end of season.

The 2023–24 season was the 17th in the history of Wellington Phoenix Football Club. In addition to the domestic league, the club participated in the Australia Cup for the ninth time.

== Overview ==
=== Pre-season ===
On 14 April 2023, it was announced that Ufuk Talay would depart the club at the end of the season. The following week, assistant coach Giancarlo Italiano was announced as the next head coach on a 2-year deal.

On 10 May, the Phoenix announced the departures of eight players, including vice-captain Oliver Sail, Clayton Lewis, Steven Ugarkovic and Callan Elliot.

On 11 May, the Phoenix announced their first signing of the off-season in Mohamed Al-Taay on a two-year deal from the Newcastle Jets. On 18 May, it was announced that Nicholas Pennington had signed a one-year contract extension with the club. On 9 June, the Phoenix announced the signing of Jack Duncan on a one-year deal.

On 6 July, the Phoenix signed academy player Lukas Kelly-Heald on a four-year professional contract. On 2 August, it was announced that Reserves midfielder Fin Conchie had signed a three-year professional contract with the club. On 13 September, the club announced the signing of their academy captain Isaac Hughes on a two-year professional deal. On 27 September, the Phoenix announced their final off-season signing in 17-year old Luke Supyk, who had only joined the club's academy 5 months prior, on a three-year deal. Despite initial criticism, these signings came as a result of the club putting greater emphasis on developing young New Zealand players.

The Phoenix would make a positive start to pre-season with a 5–1 win over Western Suburbs in their first friendly. They would then go on to beat Wellington Olympic twice with an aggregate score of 5–1.

=== Australia Cup ===
The Phoenix progressed to the Round of 16 of the Australia Cup after a 2–1 win over NPL side Peninsula Power. However, they would then succumb to a 3–0 loss against Melbourne City in the Round of 16, getting eliminated from the cup campaign in the process.

=== A–League Men ===
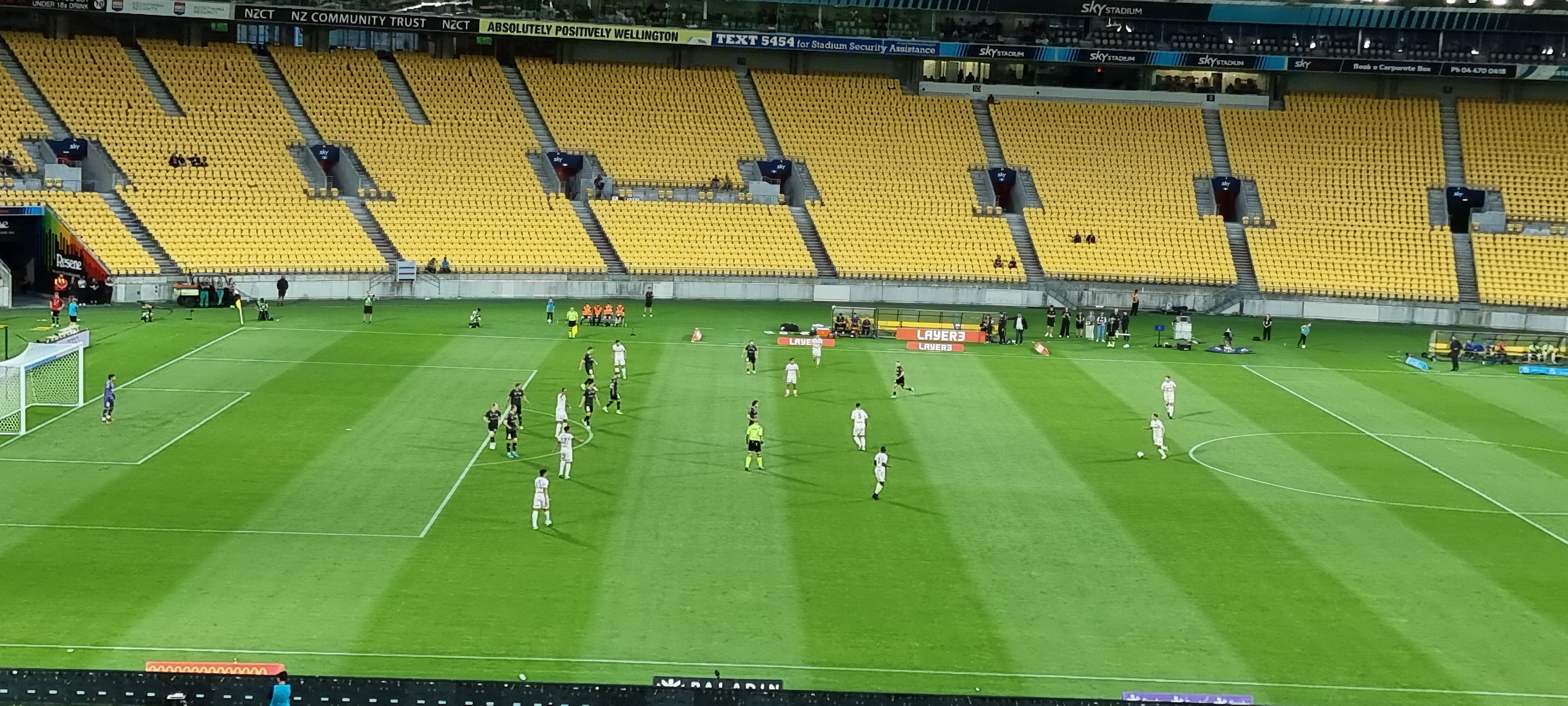
Wellington Phoenix playing against Melbourne Victory on 19 January 2024.

The Phoenix kicked off their season on 22 October against the Western Sydney Wanderers in Sydney.

== Players ==
Note: Flags indicate national team as defined under FIFA eligibility rules; some limited exceptions apply. Players may hold more than one non-FIFA nationality.

No.	Pos.	Nation	Player
3	DF	NZL	Finn Surman
4	DF	ENG	Scott Wootton
5	MF	NZL	Fin Conchie
6	DF	NZL	Tim Payne
7	FW	NZL	Kosta Barbarouses
8	MF	NZL	Ben Old
9	FW	POL	Oskar Zawada
10	FW	ENG	David Ball
11	MF	BUL	Bozhidar Kraev
12	MF	IRQ	Mohamed Al-Taay
14	MF	NZL	Alex Rufer (captain)
15	MF	AUS	Nicholas Pennington

No.	Pos.	Nation	Player
17	MF	CRC	Youstin Salas (on loan from Deportivo Saprissa)
18	DF	NZL	Lukas Kelly-Heald
19	DF	NZL	Sam Sutton
23	FW	NZL	Luke Supyk (scholarship)
24	FW	NZL	Oskar van Hattum
25	GK	AUS	Jack Duncan
26	DF	NZL	Isaac Hughes
30	GK	NZL	Alby Kelly-Heald (scholarship)
40	GK	NZL	Alex Paulsen
43	DF	NZL	Matthew Sheridan (scholarship)
51	FW	NZL	Gabriel Sloane-Rodrigues (scholarship)

== Transfers ==
=== Transfers in ===
No.	Position	Player	Transferred from	Type/fee	Contract length	Date	Ref.
12	MF	(Iraq) Mohamed Al-Taay	Newcastle Jets	Free transfer	2 years	11 May 2023	
25	GK	(Australia) Jack Duncan	Newcastle Jets	Free transfer	1 year	9 June 2023	
17	MF	(Costa Rica) Youstin Salas	(Costa Rica) Deportivo Saprissa	Loan	5 months	30 January 2024	

=== Transfers out ===
No.	Position	Player	Transferred to	Type/fee	Date	Ref.
23	MF	Clayton Lewis	Unattached	End of contract	9 May 2023	
5	MF	(Australia) Steven Ugarkovic	Unattached	End of contract	10 May 2023	
12	DF	(Australia) Lucas Mauragis	Newcastle Jets	End of loan	10 May 2023	
15	DF	Nikko Boxall	Unattached	End of contract	10 May 2023	
17	DF	Callan Elliot	Unattached	End of contract	10 May 2023	
20	GK	Oliver Sail	Unattached	End of contract	10 May 2023	
21	DF	(Australia) Joshua Laws	Unattached	End of contract	10 May 2023	
31	MF	(Brazil) Yan Sasse	Unattached	End of contract	10 May 2023	

=== From youth squad ===
N	Pos.	Nat.	Name	Age	Notes
18	DF	(New Zealand)	Lukas Kelly-Heald	18	4-year senior contract
5	MF	(New Zealand)	Fin Conchie	19	3-year senior contract
26	DF	(New Zealand)	Isaac Hughes	19	2-year senior contract
23	FW	(New Zealand)	Luke Supyk	17	3-year contract, the first two of which are on scholarship terms.
30	GK	(New Zealand)	Alby Kelly-Heald	18	3.5-year scholarship contract
43	DF	(New Zealand)	Matthew Sheridan	19	1.5-year scholarship contract
51	FW	(New Zealand)	Gabriel Sloane-Rodrigues	16	3-year contract, the first two of which are on scholarship terms.

=== Contract extensions ===
No.	Player	Position	Duration	Date	Notes	Ref.
13	(Australia) Nicholas Pennington	Central midfielder	1 year	18 May 2023		
40	Alex Paulsen	Goalkeeper	3 years	2 November 2023	Contract extended from end of 2023–24 until end of 2026–27.	
8	Ben Old	Attacking midfielder	3 years	22 November 2023	Contract extended from end of 2023–24 until end of 2026–27.	

== Pre-season and friendlies ==
26 July 2023	Wellington Phoenix	5–1	(New Zealand) Western Suburbs	Wellington
	Kraev (?); Payne (?); Zawada (?); Rudland (?)	Report	? (?)	Attendance: 0 (behind closed doors)

19 August 2023	Wellington Phoenix	2–0	(New Zealand) Wellington Olympic	Wellington
	Kraev (?); Supyk (?)	Report		Attendance: 0 (behind closed doors)

16 September 2023	Wellington Phoenix	3–1	(New Zealand) Wellington Olympic	Wellington
		Report		Attendance: 0 (behind closed doors)

7 October 2023	Newcastle Jets	2–2	Wellington Phoenix	Sydney
	Stamatelopoulos (?)	Report	Kraev (?); ? (?)	Stadium: Valentine Sports Park; Attendance: 0 (behind closed doors)

14 October 2023	Melbourne Victory	0–1	Wellington Phoenix	Melbourne
		Report	Barbarouses 62'	Stadium: City Vista Pavilion and Sports Field; Attendance: 0 (behind closed doors)

== Competitions ==
=== Overall record ===
Competition	First match	Last match	Starting round	Final position	Record							
Competition	First match	Last match	Starting round	Final position	Pld	W	D	L	GF	GA	GD	Win %
A-League Men	22 October 2023	27 April 2024	Matchday 1	2nd	27	15	8	4	42	26	+16	55.56
A-League Finals	10–12 May 2024	18 May 2024	Semi-finals	Semi-finals	2	0	1	1	1	2	−1	0.00
Australia Cup	4 August 2023	27 August 2023	Round of 32	Round of 16	2	1	0	1	2	4	−2	50.00
Total					31	16	9	6	45	32	+13	51.61

Last updated: 19 May 2024
Source: Soccerway

=== A-League Men ===
==== League table ====
Pos	Team	Pld	W	D	L	GF	GA	GD	Pts	Qualification
1	Central Coast Mariners (C)	27	17	4	6	49	27	+22	55	Qualification for AFC Champions League Elite and Finals series
2	Wellington Phoenix (Note: Wellington Phoenix cannot qualify for Asian Football Confederation competitions as they are based in New Zealand, which is part of the Oceania Football Confederation.)	27	15	8	4	42	26	+16	53	Qualification for Finals series (Note: The top two teams enter the finals series at the semi-finals, while the teams ranked third to sixth enter the finals series at the elimination-finals.)
3	Melbourne Victory	27	10	12	5	43	33	+10	42	Qualification for Finals series
4	Sydney FC	27	12	5	10	52	41	+11	41	Qualification for AFC Champions League Two and Finals series (Note: Qualified for AFC Champions League Two as the 2023 Australia Cup winners.)
5	Macarthur FC	27	11	8	8	45	48	−3	41	Qualification for Finals series

Source: A-Leagues
Rules for classification: 1) points; 2) wins; 3) goal difference; 4) goals scored; 5) head-to-head results; 5a) head-to-head points; 5b) head-to-head goal difference; 6) Fair Play points; 7) away goal difference; 8) away goals per match; 9) home goal difference; 10) home goals per match; 11) toss of a coin in an event of a tie of two clubs.
(C) Champions

==== Results summary ====
Away figures include Wellington Phoenix's 4–3 win on neutral ground against Perth Glory on 14 January 2024.

Overall								Home						Away					
Pld	W	D	L	GF	GA	GD	Pts	W	D	L	GF	GA	GD	W	D	L	GF	GA	GD
27	15	8	4	42	26	+16	53	10	2	1	23	10	+13	5	6	3	19	16	+3

Last updated: 27 April 2024.
Source: Ultimate A-League

==== Results by round ====
Round	1	2	3	4	5	6	7	8	9	10	11	27	13	14	15	12	16	17	18	19	20	21	22	23	24	25	26
Ground	A	H	H	A	H	A	H	A	H	A	A	N	H	A	A	H	H	A	A	H	A	H	H	A	H	A	H
Result	D	W	W	D	W	W	L	W	W	L	D	W	D	W	D	D	W	W	D	W	L	W	W	L	W	D	W
Position	8	4	3	3	2	1	3	1	1	1	2	1	1	1	1	1	1	1	1	1	2	1	1	2	2	1	2
Points	1	4	7	8	11	14	14	17	20	20	21	24	25	28	29	30	33	36	37	40	40	43	46	46	49	50	53

Updated to match(es) played on 1 May 2024. Source: Ultimate A-League
A = Away; H = Home; N = Neutral; W = Win; D = Draw; L = Loss

==== Matches ====
Win Draw Loss Fixtures

22 October 2023 1	Western Sydney Wanderers	0–0	Wellington Phoenix	Sydney
15:00 AEDT		Report		Stadium: CommBank Stadium; Attendance: 10,468; Referee: Ben Abraham

28 October 2023 2	Wellington Phoenix	2–1	Perth Glory	Wellington
17:30 NZDT	Zawada 9'; Kraev 74'	Report	Beevers 59'	Stadium: Sky Stadium; Attendance: 6,101; Referee: Daniel Elder

4 November 2023 3	Wellington Phoenix	5–2	Brisbane Roar	Wellington
17:30 NZDT	Payne 24'; Zawada 32', 63', 90+2'; Kraev 58'	Report	Berenguer 1'; Mileusnic 53'	Stadium: Sky Stadium; Attendance: 7,003; Referee: Jack Morgan

10 November 2023 4	Melbourne Victory	1–1	Wellington Phoenix	Melbourne
19:45 AEDT	Teague 14'	Report	Da Silva 41' (o.g.)	Stadium: AAMI Park; Attendance: 10,583; Referee: Shaun Evans

25 November 2023 5	Wellington Phoenix	1–0	Melbourne City	Auckland
17:30 NZDT	Kraev 48'	Report		Stadium: Go Media Stadium; Attendance: 8,327; Referee: Lachlan Keevers

2 December 2023 6	Western United	0–1	Wellington Phoenix	Ballarat
15:30 AEDT		Report	Old 79'	Stadium: Mars Stadium; Attendance: 2,043; Referee: Tim Danaskos

9 December 2023 7	Wellington Phoenix	0–3	Newcastle Jets	Wellington
19:30 NZDT		Report	Stamatelopoulos 4', 47' (pen.); Taylor 43'	Stadium: Sky Stadium; Attendance: 4,395; Referee: Jonathan Barreiro

18 December 2023 8	Macarthur FC	0–3	Wellington Phoenix	Sydney
19:00 AEDT		Report	Kraev 40'; Barbarouses 58', 61'	Stadium: Campbelltown Stadium; Attendance: 4,893; Referee: Alex King

23 December 2023 9	Wellington Phoenix	2–0	Western Sydney Wanderers	Wellington
17:30 NZDT	Barbarouses 90+1'; Old 90+4'	Report		Stadium: Sky Stadium; Attendance: 7,294; Referee: Casey Reibelt

29 December 2023 10	Sydney FC	3–1	Wellington Phoenix	Sydney
19:45 AEDT	Grant 11'; Mak 86'; Gomes 90+4'	Report	Barbarouses 81'	Stadium: Allianz Stadium; Attendance: 14,343; Referee: Alireza Faghani

4 January 2024 11	Adelaide United	2–2	Wellington Phoenix	Adelaide
19:15 ACDT	Ibusuki 26', 55'	Report	Barbarouses 15', 46'	Stadium: Coopers Stadium; Attendance: 11,187; Referee: Jonathan Barreiro

14 January 2024 27	Perth Glory	3–4	Wellington Phoenix	Sydney
19:45 AEDT	Taggart 7'; Šušnjar 50'; Carluccio 70'	Report	Barbarouses 29', 73'; Rufer 45+2'; Payne 57'	Stadium: CommBank Stadium; Attendance: 1,632; Referee: Tim Danaskos

19 January 2024 13	Wellington Phoenix	1–1	Melbourne Victory	Wellington
19:00 NZDT	Rufer 90+5' (pen.)	Report	Chapman 79'	Stadium: Sky Stadium; Attendance: 9,139; Referee: Daniel Elder

27 January 2024 14	Newcastle Jets	1–2	Wellington Phoenix	Newcastle
18:00 AEDT	Buhagiar 80'	Report	Rufer 5' (pen.); Zawada 87'	Stadium: McDonald Jones Stadium; Attendance: 5,437; Referee: Casey Reibelt

2 February 2024 15	Brisbane Roar	1–1	Wellington Phoenix	Brisbane
18:45 AEST	Brown 90+4'	Report	Kraev 51'	Stadium: Suncorp Stadium; Attendance: 5,327; Referee: Ben Abraham

6 February 2024 12	Wellington Phoenix	0–0	Central Coast Mariners	Wellington
16:00 NZDT		Report		Stadium: Sky Stadium; Attendance: 12,301; Referee: Alex King

10 February 2024 16	Wellington Phoenix	2–0	Western United	Wellington
17:30 NZDT	Pennington 3'; Doanchie 47' (o.g.)	Report		Stadium: Sky Stadium; Attendance: 6,434; Referee: Adam Bavcar

18 February 2024 17	Macarthur FC	1–2	Wellington Phoenix	Sydney
17:00 AEDT	Bernardo 78'	Report	Barbarouses 31' (pen.), 73'	Stadium: Campbelltown Stadium; Attendance: 3,024; Referee: Shaun Evans

24 February 2024 18	Perth Glory	0–0	Wellington Phoenix	Perth
18:45 AWST		Report		Stadium: HBF Park; Attendance: 8,252; Referee: Daniel Elder

3 March 2024 19	Wellington Phoenix	3–2	Adelaide United	Wellington
17:00 NZDT	Old 36', 78'; van Hattum 69'	Report	Jovanovic 60' (pen.); Ibusuki 90+4'	Stadium: Sky Stadium; Attendance: 7,207; Referee: Jack Morgan

9 March 2024 20	Melbourne City	1–0	Wellington Phoenix	Melbourne
19:00 AEDT	Souprayen 58'	Report		Stadium: AAMI Park; Attendance: 4,461; Referee: Alex King

16 March 2024 21	Wellington Phoenix	2–1	Sydney FC	Auckland
17:30 NZDT	Matthews 54' (o.g.); Barbarouses 69'	Report	Mak 6'	Stadium: Eden Park; Attendance: 18,002; Referee: Alireza Faghani

31 March 2024 22	Wellington Phoenix	1–0	Brisbane Roar	Wellington
13:00 NZDT	Kraev 2'	Report		Stadium: Sky Stadium; Attendance: 8,225; Referee: Tim Danaskos
Note: Originally scheduled for 29 March, the match was postponed by two days.

6 April 2024 23	Central Coast Mariners	2–1	Wellington Phoenix	Gosford
17:30	Torres 61'; Doka 90+1'	Report	Old 78'	Stadium: Industree Group Stadium; Attendance: 9,438; Referee: Alex King

12 April 2024 24	Wellington Phoenix	1–0	Melbourne Victory	Wellington
19:00 NZST	Miranda 90+5' (o.g.)	Report		Stadium: Sky Stadium; Attendance: 6,360; Referee: Daniel Elder

19 April 2024 25	Newcastle Jets	1–1	Wellington Phoenix	Newcastle
19:45 AEST	Paulsen 15' (o.g.)	Report	Barbarouses 71'	Stadium: McDonald Jones Stadium; Attendance: 4,376; Referee: Alireza Faghani

27 April 2024 26	Wellington Phoenix	3–0	Macarthur FC	Wellington
19:15 NZST	Barbarouses 22'; Payne 29'; Zawada 90+2' (pen.)	Report		Stadium: Sky Stadium; Attendance: 15,428; Referee: Ben Abraham

==== Finals series ====
12 May 2024 Semi final	Melbourne Victory	0–0	Wellington Phoenix	Melbourne
16:00 AEST		Report		Stadium: AAMI Park; Attendance: 16,313; Referee: Adam Kersey

18 May 2024 Semi final	Wellington Phoenix	1–2 (a.e.t.) (1–2 agg.)	Melbourne Victory	Wellington
18:30 NZST	Zawada 90+9'	Report	Traoré 82'; Ikonomidis 102'	Stadium: Sky Stadium; Attendance: 33,297; Referee: Daniel Elder

=== Australia Cup ===
Win Draw Loss Fixtures

4 August 2023 Round of 32	Pensinula Power (Queensland)	1–2 (a.e.t.)	Wellington Phoenix	Brisbane
19:30 AEST	Greenwood 71'	Report	Pennington 43'; Rudland 119'	Stadium: A.J. Kelly Park; Attendance: 1,000; Referee: Shane Skinner

27 August 2023 Round of 16	Melbourne City	3–0	Wellington Phoenix	Melbourne
14:00 AEST	Ugarkovic 37'; Maclaren 76', 78'	Report		Stadium: Jack Edwards Reserve; Attendance: 1,153; Referee: Lachlan Keevers

== Statistics ==
=== Appearances and goals ===
Includes all competitions. Players with no appearances not included in the list.

As of 18 May 2024

No.	Pos.	Nat.	Player	A-League Men		A-League Men Finals		Australia Cup		Total	
No.	Pos.	Nat.	Player	Apps	Goals	Apps	Goals	Apps	Goals	Apps	Goals
3	DF	(New Zealand)	Finn Surman	27	0	2	0	2	0	31	0
4	DF	(England)	Scott Wooton	27	0	2	0	1+1	0	31	0
5	MF	(New Zealand)	Fin Conchie	2+9	0	0	0	0	0	11	0
6	DF	(New Zealand)	Tim Payne	22+1	3	2	0	2	0	27	3
7	FW	(New Zealand)	Kosta Barbarouses	25+1	13	2	0	2	0	30	13
8	MF	(New Zealand)	Ben Old	15+12	5	2	0	0	0	29	5
9	FW	(Poland)	Oskar Zawada	5+7	6	0+2	1	2	0	16	7
10	FW	(England)	David Ball	18+6	0	2	0	0+1	0	27	0
11	MF	(Bulgaria)	Bozhidar Kraev	25+1	6	2	0	2	0	30	6
12	MF	(Iraq)	Mohamed Al-Taay	17+8	0	0+2	0	1	0	28	0
14	MF	(New Zealand)	Alex Rufer	24	3	2	0	2	0	28	3
15	MF	(Australia)	Nicholas Pennington	20+3	1	2	0	2	1	27	2
17	MF	(Costa Rica)	Youstin Salas	6+4	0	0+2	0	0	0	12	0
18	DF	(New Zealand)	Lukas Kelly-Heald	18+4	0	0+1	0	2	0	25	0
19	MF	(New Zealand)	Sam Sutton	11+9	0	2	0	0+1	0	23	0
23	FW	(New Zealand)	Luke Supyk	0+4	0	0	0	0+1	0	5	0
24	FW	(New Zealand)	Oskar van Hattum	3+12	1	0+2	0	1	0	18	1
26	DF	(New Zealand)	Isaac Hughes	4+6	0	0+1	0	0+1	0	12	0
40	GK	(New Zealand)	Alex Paulsen	27	0	2	0	2	0	31	0
42	FW	(New Zealand)	Fergus Gillion	0+1	0	0	0	0+1	0	2	0
43	DF	(New Zealand)	Matthew Sheridan	1+3	0	0	0	0	0	4	0
51	FW	(New Zealand)	Gabriel Sloane-Rodrigues	0+1	0	0	0	0	0	1	0
Player(s) transferred out but featured this season
34	FW	(New Zealand)	Josh Rudland	0	0	0	0	1+1	1	2	1
36	FW	(New Zealand)	Ben Wallace	0	0	0	0	0+1	0	1	0
41	FW	(New Zealand)	Kaelin Nguyen	0	0	0	0	0+1	0	1	0
52	MF	(New Zealand)	Jackson Manuel	0+1	0	0	0	0	0	1	0

=== Disciplinary record ===
Includes all competitions. The list is sorted by squad number when total cards are equal. Players with no cards not included in the list.

As of 18 May 2024

Rank	No.	Pos.	Nat.	Name	A-League Men			A-League Men Finals			Australia Cup			Total		
Rank	No.	Pos.	Nat.	Name	Yellow card	(yellow card) (yellow-red card)	Red card	Yellow card	(yellow card) (yellow-red card)	Red card	Yellow card	(yellow card) (yellow-red card)	Red card	Yellow card	(yellow card) (yellow-red card)	Red card
1	14	MF	(New Zealand)	Alex Rufer	7	0	1	1	0	0	1	0	0	9	0	1
2	6	DF	(New Zealand)	Tim Payne	2	0	1	0	0	0	0	0	0	2	0	1
3	15	MF	(Australia)	Nicholas Pennington	5	0	0	1	0	0	1	0	0	7	0	0
4	7	FW	(New Zealand)	Kosta Barbarouses	4	0	0	0	0	0	1	0	0	5	0	0
4	9	FW	(Poland)	Oskar Zawada	5	0	0	0	0	0	0	0	0	5	0	0
4	17	MF	(Costa Rica)	Youstin Salas	4	0	0	1	0	0	0	0	0	5	0	0
7	11	MF	(Bulgaria)	Bozhidar Kraev	4	0	0	0	0	0	0	0	0	4	0	0
7	19	MF	(New Zealand)	Sam Sutton	4	0	0	0	0	0	0	0	0	4	0	0
7	10	FW	(England)	David Ball	3	0	0	1	0	0	0	0	0	4	0	0
10	3	DF	(New Zealand)	Finn Surman	2	0	0	0	0	0	0	0	0	2	0	0
10	4	FW	(England)	Scott Wooton	2	0	0	0	0	0	0	0	0	2	0	0
10	24	FW	(New Zealand)	Oskar van Hattum	2	0	0	0	0	0	0	0	0	2	0	0
10	40	GK	(New Zealand)	Alex Paulsen	2	0	0	0	0	0	0	0	0	2	0	0
14	12	MF	(Iraq)	Mohamed Al-Taay	1	0	0	0	0	0	0	0	0	1	0	0
14	18	DF	(New Zealand)	Lukas Kelly-Heald	1	0	0	0	0	0	0	0	0	1	0	0
14	26	DF	(New Zealand)	Isaac Hughes	1	0	0	0	0	0	0	0	0	1	0	0
Total					49	0	2	4	0	0	3	0	0	56	0	2

=== Clean sheets ===
Includes all competitions. The list is sorted by squad number when total clean sheets are equal. Numbers in parentheses represent games where both goalkeepers participated and both kept a clean sheet; the number in parentheses is awarded to the goalkeeper who was substituted on, whilst a full clean sheet is awarded to the goalkeeper who was on the field at the start of play. Goalkeepers with no clean sheets not included in the list.

As of 18 May 2024

Rank	No.	Nat.	Goalkeeper	A-League Men	A-League Men Finals	Australia Cup	Total
1	40	(New Zealand)	Alex Paulsen	11	1	0	12
Total				11	1	0	12

== Awards ==
=== Players ===
No.	Pos.	Player	Award	Source
40	GK	(New Zealand) Alex Paulsen	A-League Men Player of the Month (October/November)	
40	GK	(New Zealand) Alex Paulsen	A-League Men Player of the Month (March)	
7	FW	(New Zealand) Kosta Barbarouses	A-League Men Player of the Month (December)	
7	FW	(New Zealand) Kosta Barbarouses	A-League Men Player of the Month (January)	
26	DF	(New Zealand) Isaac Hughes	A-League Men Player of the Month (February)	

=== Managers ===
Manager	Award	Source
(Australia) Giancarlo Italiano	A-League Men Coach of the Month (October/November)	

== See also ==
- 2023–24 Wellington Phoenix FC (A-League Women) season
