= A-League Men Coach of the Month =

A-League Coach of the Month
- Sport: Football
- League: A-League
- Awarded for: Best manager of the month
- Country: Australia

History
- Most recent: Giancarlo Italiano

The A-League Coach of the Month is an association football award that recognises the best adjudged A-League manager each month of the season in Australia. The winner is chosen by a combination of an online public vote.

== List of winners ==
Month	Year	Manager	Nationality	Club	Ref.
October	2019	Markus Babbel	Germany	Western Sydney Wanderers	
November	2019	Ernie Merrick	Scotland	Newcastle Jets	
December	2019	Ufuk Talay	Australia	Wellington Phoenix	
January	2020	Robbie Fowler	England	Brisbane Roar	
February	2020	Robbie Fowler	England	Brisbane Roar	
January	2023	Ufuk Talay	Australia	Wellington Phoenix	
October/November	2023	Giancarlo Italiano	Australia	Wellington Phoenix	
December	2023	Mark Jackson	England	Central Coast Mariners	
January	2024	Mark Jackson	England	Central Coast Mariners	
February	2024	Mark Jackson	England	Central Coast Mariners	
March	2024	Mark Jackson	England	Central Coast Mariners	
April	2024	Mark Jackson	England	Central Coast Mariners	
October/November	2024	Steve Corica	Australia	Auckland FC	
December	2024	Steve Corica	Australia	Auckland FC	
January	2025	Steve Corica	Australia	Auckland FC	
February	2025	Steve Corica	Australia	Auckland FC	
March	2025	Steve Corica	Australia	Auckland FC	
April/May	2025	Steve Corica	Australia	Auckland FC	
October/November	2025	Ufuk Talay	Australia	Sydney FC	
December	2025	Steve Corica	Australia	Auckland FC	

== Awards won by nationality ==
Nationality	Managers	Wins
Australia	3	11
England	2	7
Germany	1	1
Scotland	1	1

== Awards won by club ==
Club	Managers	Wins
Auckland FC	1	7
Central Coast Mariners	1	5
Wellington Phoenix	2	3
Brisbane Roar	1	2
Newcastle Jets	1	1
Sydney FC	1	1
Western Sydney Wanderers	1	1

== See also ==
- A-League Men Player of the Month
