= Melbourne City FC league record by opponent =

Melbourne City Football Club is an Australian professional association football club based in Cranbourne East in Melbourne. The club was formed in 2009 as Melbourne Heart before it was renamed to Melbourne City in 2014.

Melbourne City's first team competes in the A-League Men. Melbourne City's first A-League Men match was against the Central Coast Mariners, and they met their 14th and most recent different league opponent, Macarthur FC, for the first time in the 2020–21 A-League season. The team that Melbourne City have played most in league competition is Adelaide United; who they first met in the 2010–11 A-League season. The 18 defeats from 42 meetings against Perth Glory is more than they have lost against any other club. Adelaide United have drawn 13 league encounters with Melbourne City, more than any other club. Melbourne City have recorded more league victories against Brisbane Roar than against any other club, having beaten them 21 times.

== Key ==
- The table includes results of matches played by Melbourne City in the A-League Men regular season and finals series.
- The name used for each opponent is the name they had when Melbourne City most recently played a league match against them.
- The columns headed "First" and "Last" contain the first and most recent seasons in which Melbourne City played league matches against each opponent.
- P = matches played; W = matches won; D = matches drawn; L = matches lost; Win% = percentage of total matches won
- † Clubs with this background and symbol in the "Opponent" column are Melbourne City's divisional rivals in the current season.
- ‡ Clubs with this background and symbol in the "Opponent" column are defunct.

== All-time league record ==
Statistics correct as at match played 12 March 2024.

Melbourne City FC league record by opponent
Club	Pld	W	D	L	Pld	W	D	L	Pld	W	D	L	Win%	First	Last	Notes
Club	Home				Away				Total				Win%	First	Last	Notes
Adelaide United †	19	9	4	6	23	5	8	10	43	14	13	16	32.56	2010–11	2023–24	
Brisbane Roar †	19	15	3	1	22	6	4	12	41	21	7	13	51.22	2010–11	2023–24	
Central Coast Mariners †	21	12	4	5	18	4	5	9	39	16	9	14	41.03	2010–11	2023–24	
Gold Coast United	3	1	2	0	3	1	1	1	6	2	3	1	33.33	2010–11	2011–12	
Macarthur FC †	5	4	1	0	4	1	2	1	9	5	3	1	55.56	2020–21	2023–24	
Melbourne Victory †	22	8	7	7	20	6	6	8	42	14	13	15	33.33	2010–11	2023–24	
Newcastle Jets †	18	11	4	3	21	9	1	11	39	20	5	14	51.28	2010–11	2023–24	
North Queensland Fury ‡	2	2	0	0	1	1	0	0	3	3	0	0	100.00	2010–11	2010–11	
Perth Glory †	22	7	8	7	20	6	3	11	42	13	11	18	30.95	2010–11	2023–24	
Sydney FC †	20	9	5	6	19	5	7	7	41	15	12	14	36.59	2010–11	2023–24	
Wellington Phoenix †	19	12	6	1	20	7	2	11	39	19	8	12	48.72	2010–11	2023–24	
Western Sydney Wanderers †	15	8	3	4	15	4	4	7	31	12	7	12	38.71	2012–13	2023–24	
Western United †	7	4	0	3	6	3	1	2	15	9	1	5	60.00	2019–20	2023–24	
