= Isaac Hughes (footballer) =

New Zealand footballer

- Hughes playing for the Wellington Phoenix in 2026.

Personal information
- Full name: Isaac Robert Hughes
- Date of birth: 25 March 2004 (age 22)
- Place of birth: Warrington, England
- Height: 1.83 m (6 ft 0 in)
- Position: Defender

Team information
- Current team: Wellington Phoenix
- Number: 15

Youth career
- Bolton Wanderers
- Crewe Alexandra

Senior career*
Years	Team	Apps	(Gls)
2022–	Wellington Phoenix Reserves	42	(0)
2023–	Wellington Phoenix	55	(4)

International career^{‡}
2022–2023	New Zealand U20	8	(1)
2023–	New Zealand U23	2	(0)
Medal record
Men's football
Representing New Zealand
OFC Men's Olympic Qualifying Tournament
Winner	2024 New Zealand
OFC U-19 Championship
Winner	2022 Tahiti
- * Club domestic league appearances and goals as of 17 April 2026 ‡ National team caps and goals as of 30 August 2023

Isaac Robert Hughes (born 25 March 2004) is a professional footballer who plays for Wellington Phoenix. Born in England, he represented New Zealand at youth international level.

== Club career ==
=== Youth career ===
Hughes played for both the Bolton Wanderers and Crewe Alexandra academies before moving to New Zealand at the age of 9.

=== Wellington Phoenix ===
Hughes made his Wellington Phoenix debut on 27 August 2023 against Melbourne City in the Australia Cup as a second-half substitute. On 13 September 2023, Hughes signed a two-year contract with the first team after captaining the reserves side. After 10 appearances for the Nix and one season, Hughes signed a three-year contract extension with the Wellington Phoenix, committing to the club through until the end of the 2027-28 A-League.

Hughes made his 50th appearance for the Phoenix in the Kiwi Derby vs Auckland FC in matchday 18 on 21st February 2026.

== International career ==
Hughes was selected for the New Zealand U20s in the 2022 OFC U-19 Championship. He made his debut against Cook Islands in the opening game. Hughes scored one goal in the tournament against Tahiti in the semi-finals. Hughes was also called up for the 2023 FIFA U-20 World Cup where he started 3 of New Zealand's games.

Hughes made his debut for U23 on 23 March 2023 against China. He was selected in the squad for the 2023 OFC Men's Olympic Qualifying Tournament where he made one appearance.

Hughes was selected for the OlyWhites Paris 2024 Olympics squad but did not make an appearance.

== Career statistics ==
=== Club ===
As of match played on 1st December 2025

Appearances and goals by club, season and competition
Club	Season	League			Cup		Others		Total	
Club	Season	Division	Apps	Goals	Apps	Goals	Apps	Goals	Apps	Goals
Wellington Phoenix Reserves	2022	National League	24	0	—		—		24	0
Wellington Phoenix Reserves	2023	National League	17	0	—		—		17	0
Wellington Phoenix Reserves	2024	National League	1	0	0	0	—		1	0
Wellington Phoenix Reserves	Total		42	0	0	0	—		42	0
Wellington Phoenix	2023–24	A-League Men	11	0	1	0	0	0	12	0
Wellington Phoenix	2024–25	A-League Men	24	2	1	0	0	0	25	2
Wellington Phoenix	2025–26	A-League Men	24	2	3	1	0	0	27	2
Career total			111	4	5	1	0	0	116	5

== Honours ==
New Zealand U20

- OFC U-19 Championship: 2022

New Zealand U23

- OFC Men's Olympic Qualifying Tournament: 2023

Individual

- A-League Men Player of the Month: February 2024
