= Mohamed Al-Taay =

Iraqi footballer (born 2000)

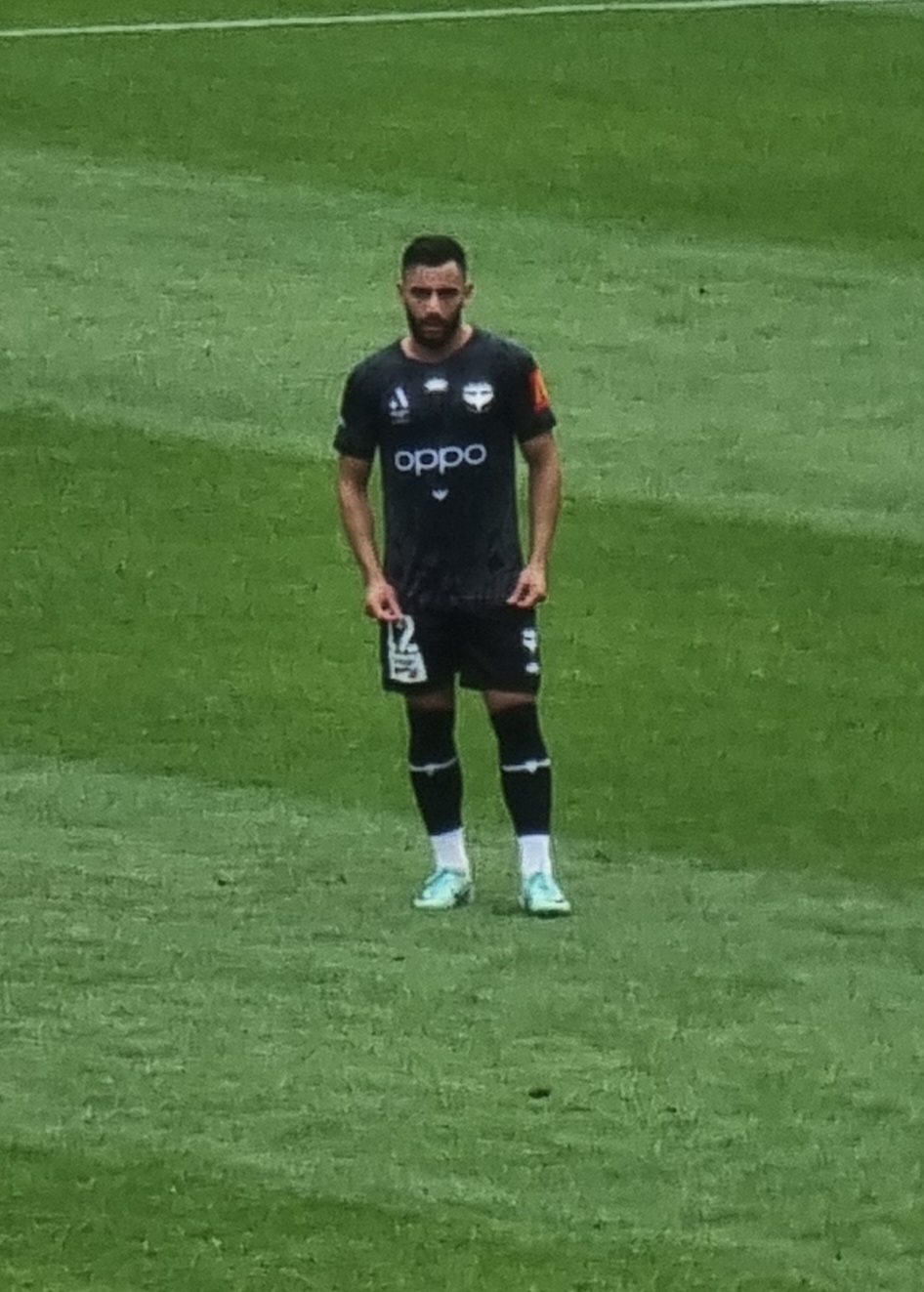
- Al-Taay playing for the Wellington Phoenix in 2024.

Personal information
- Full name: Mohamed Huseian Reda Khafaji Al Taay
- Date of birth: 15 June 2000 (age 26)
- Place of birth: Campbelltown, Australia
- Height: 1.72 m (5 ft 8 in)
- Position: Midfielder

Team information
- Current team: Al-Karma

Youth career
- 2012–2015: Blacktown City
- 2016: Marconi Stallions FC
- 2017–2021: Western Sydney Wanderers

Senior career*
Years	Team	Apps	(Gls)
2017–2021	Western Sydney Wanderers NPL	76	(0)
2020–2021	Western Sydney Wanderers	0	(0)
2021–2023	Newcastle Jets	29	(0)
2023–2025	Wellington Phoenix	36	(0)
2025–2026	Western Sydney Wanderers	8	(0)
2026–	Al-Karma	6	(0)

International career^{‡}
2024–	Iraq	3	(0)
- * Club domestic league appearances and goals as of 13 May 2026 ‡ National team caps and goals as of 6 June 2024

Mohamed Huseian Reda Khafaji Al Taay (Arabic: محمد الطائي, pronounced [mˤɑˈħmɑd ɑtˤˈtˤɑːʔiː]; born 15 June 2000) is a professional footballer who plays as a midfielder for Iraqi Stars League club Al-Karma. Born in Australia, he plays for the Iraq national team.

== Early life ==
Al-Taay was born in Campbelltown, New South Wales with two older brothers and one younger sister. His parents, who hailed from Iraq, fled to Australia in 1994 due to the conflicts under Saddam Hussein. His father fled Iraq in 1991 to a refugee camp in Saudi Arabia before moving to Australia.

Al-Taay began playing football at the age of six with his father and brothers and attended Campbelltown Performing Arts High School growing up. He joined his first football clubs with Blacktown City and Marconi Stallions in their junior age groups.

Despite being born in Australia, Al-Taay developed interest in representing the Iraq national football team. He is a devoted Muslim and frequently participates in Ramadan. Al-Taay is fluent in Arabic and English, having learnt the former first growing up.

== Club career ==
=== Newcastle Jets ===
Having come through the Western Sydney Wanderers academy and NPL program, Al-Taay joined Newcastle Jets ahead of the 2021–22 season, in the hope of breaking through for his A-League debut.

At the conclusion of the 2022–23 A-League season, Al-Taay departed Newcastle after 29 appearances in all competitions across two seasons.

=== Wellington Phoenix ===
Al-Taay signed for Wellington Phoenix ahead of the 2023–24 season. On 17 January 2025, Al-Taay was granted an early release from his contract with the Phoenix.

=== Western Sydney Wanderers ===
Following his mid-season release from Wellington, Al-Taay returned to the Western Sydney Wanderers, where he had previously been part of their youth academy.

=== Al-Karma ===
In January 2026, Al-Taay signed for Iraqi Stars League club Al-Karma.

== International career ==
On 21 May 2024, Al-Taay was named in Iraq's 26 man squad for their 2026 FIFA World Cup qualification matches against Indonesia and Vietnam. He made his debut in the former on 6 June 2024, substituting Osama Rashid in the 86th minute as Iraq beat Indonesia with the score of 2–0.

== Style of play ==
Al-Taay is primarily positioned as a defensive midfielder but is also able to play as a centre-back and right back. He is characterised more to be a ball-winning midfielder and is noted for his work rate and defensive abilities by Giancarlo Italiano. He is also described as having a similar playing style towards Cameron Devlin.
