= Kosta Barbarouses =

New Zealand footballer (born 1990)

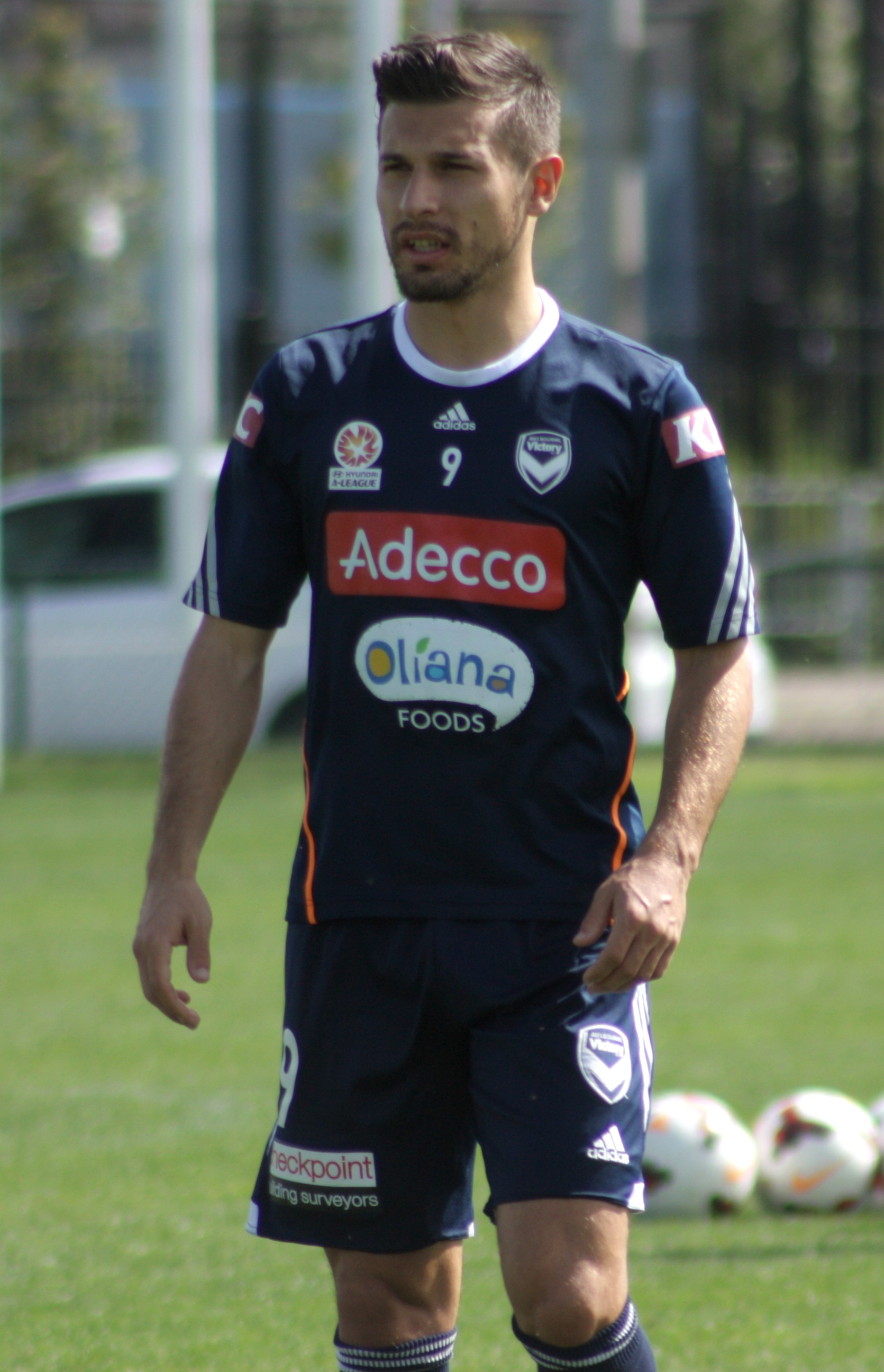
- Barbarouses training with Melbourne Victory in 2013

Personal information
- Full name: Konstantinos Barbarouses
- Date of birth: 19 February 1990 (age 36)
- Place of birth: Wellington, New Zealand
- Height: 1.71 m (5 ft 7 in)
- Position: Winger

Team information
- Current team: South Melbourne
- Number: 9

Youth career
- 1995–2000: Miramar Rangers
- 2001–2005: Wellington Olympic

Senior career*
Years	Team	Apps	(Gls)
2005–2007	Team Wellington	19	(2)
2007–2010	Wellington Phoenix	21	(2)
2008	→ Macarthur Rams (loan)	10	(1)
2010–2011	Brisbane Roar	33	(12)
2011–2013	Alania Vladikavkaz	13	(2)
2012–2013	→ Panathinaikos (loan)	11	(0)
2013–2016	Melbourne Victory	73	(17)
2016–2017	Wellington Phoenix	26	(5)
2017–2019	Melbourne Victory	53	(25)
2019–2022	Sydney FC	63	(18)
2022–2025	Wellington Phoenix	76	(25)
2025–2026	Western Sydney Wanderers	22	(4)
2026–	South Melbourne	1	(0)

International career^{‡}
2006–2007	New Zealand U17	16	(12)
2008–2009	New Zealand U20	3	(2)
2008–2012	New Zealand U23	5	(4)
2008–	New Zealand	76	(10)
Medal record
Men's football
Representing New Zealand
OFC Nations Cup
Winner	2008 Oceania
Winner	2016 Papua New Guinea
Winner	2024 Fiji–Vanuatu
Third place	2012 Solomon Islands
OFC U-17 Championship
Winner	2007 Tahiti
OFC U-19 Championship
Third place	2008 Tahiti
- * Club domestic league appearances and goals as of 19 October 2026 ‡ National team caps and goals as of 6 June 2026

Konstantinos "Kosta" Barbarouses (Greek: Κωνσταντίνος "Κώστας" Μπαρμπαρούσης, pronounced [konstaˈndinos barbaruˈsis]; born 19 February 1990) is a New Zealand professional footballer who plays as a winger for NPL Victoria club South Melbourne and the New Zealand national team.

As of June 2026, Barbarouses has played 372 A-League matches, the most of any active player in the A-League, the most of any forward in the competition's history, and the third-most of any player overall behind Leigh Broxham and Nikolai Topor-Stanley.

== Club career ==
Kosta was born in New Zealand and is of Greek descent. Before turning professional Barbarouses played for St. Patrick's College and for local clubs Wellington Olympic and Miramar Rangers in New Zealand's Central Premier League.

=== Wellington Phoenix ===
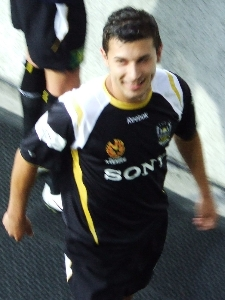
Kosta Barbarouses with Wellington Phoenix in 2009.

Barbarouses played 21 matches during his first stint with Wellington Phoenix in three seasons and scored two goals. The Phoenix club officially signed Barbarouses as one of its foundation players on 4 May 2007. Seventeen years old and still at school, he started as the club's youngest player. He made his professional debut on 21 October 2007 against Central Coast Mariners, coming on as a substitute in the 86th minute. He played his first full professional game when he fronted against Central Coast Mariners on 19 January 2008.

Barbarouses scored his first professional goal on 18 January 2009 – an equaliser against Adelaide United. He scored his second A-League goal against Sydney FC on 1 November 2009 after coming off the bench to replace Leo Bertos. He scored the goal off a volley which bounced over Clint Bolton. Barbarouses played his first match starting in the first team line-up against Newcastle Jets on 4 November 2009, assisting Chris Greenacre's goal with a back-heel pass.

=== Brisbane Roar ===
Barbarouses turned down a two-year contract extension with Wellington Phoenix in February 2010 for a three-year contract with A-League side Brisbane Roar. Brisbane Roar play an attractive brand of football and Barbarouses wanted the opportunity to play more regular football. In the 2009–10 season, which took the Phoenix into the finals, Barbarouses had had only three starts, and ten appearances off the bench.

Barbarouses made his debut for the Roar in Round 1 of the 2010–11 season, starting against Gold Coast United in a 0–0 draw on 8 August 2010. Barbarouses continued to start for the Brisbane team and played against his old club Wellington Phoenix, on 27 August 2010 at Suncorp Stadium. In the 73rd minute, he received a through-ball from team-mate Matt McKay and slotted home his first A-League goal for the Brisbane Roar. Barbarouses was named in the 2010–11 A-League All-Star Team after 12 goals in 33 appearances.

=== Alania Vladikavkaz ===
On 18 July 2011, Fairfax News NZ announced that Barbarouses had signed a three-year contract with Russian side Alania Vladikavkaz. Brisbane Roar received $600,000 as a transfer fee. Barbarouses made his debut for Vladikavkaz on 9 August 2011, in a First Division league match against Torpedo Vladimir. He played the full 90 minutes and scored the sole goal of the match, allowing Alania to win 1–0.

==== Loan to Panathinaikos ====
On 27 June 2012, Barbarouses signed a one-year loan contract with Greek giants Panathinaikos, with option to buy him in the next summer. Barbarouses only played 11 games and scored no goals during his one-year loan spell in his ancestral country. His stand out moment was when he played against rivals Olympiacos in a league match in Piraeus in a 1–1 draw.

=== Melbourne Victory ===
On 7 August 2013, Kosta signed a three-year deal at Melbourne Victory under Ange Postecoglou for the second time. The first time was at rival team Brisbane Roar, following a successful career start at home town team Wellington Phoenix.

Kosta debuted for Melbourne Victory in round 2 of the 2013–14 season in the 2–2 away draw with Adelaide United.

=== Return to Wellington Phoenix ===
On 8 March 2016, it was announced that Barbarouses would leave Melbourne Victory at the end of the season to rejoin his hometown club Wellington Phoenix on a three-year contract. On 5 June 2017, Phoenix announced they would be releasing Barbarouses following his request to leave for non-footballing reasons.

=== Return to Melbourne Victory ===
Following his release from Wellington Phoenix, Barbarouses rejoined former club Melbourne Victory on a two-year deal in June 2017. In June 2019 Melbourne Victory announced that his contract ended and he declined an extension.

=== Sydney FC ===
On 7 June 2019, Barbarouses signed on a multi-year contract deal with Sydney FC.

=== Third stint at Wellington Phoenix ===
Having missed the majority of the 2021–22 season at Sydney FC due to an ankle fracture, Barbarouses returned to his hometown club for a third stint, signing a two-year contract. On 20 January 2025, Barbarouses scored his 100th A-League Men goal in a 2–1 away win against Macarthur FC at Campbelltown Sports Stadium, Sydney.

Barbarouses left Wellington once again at the end of the 2024–25 season, after a three-season stint at the club.

=== Western Sydney Wanderers ===
Barbarouses joined the Western Sydney Wanderers, his fifth A-League club, for the 2025–26 season,

== International career ==
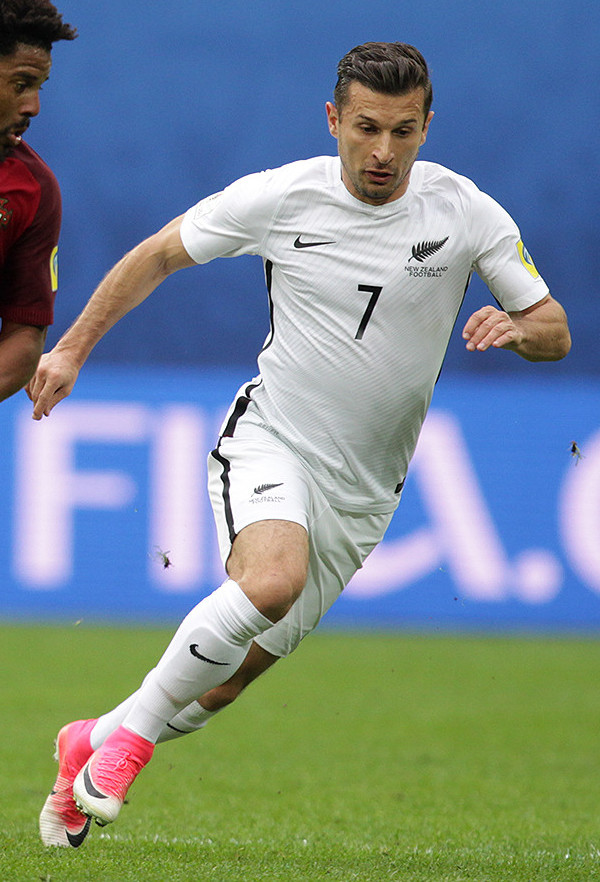
Barbarouses playing for New Zealand at the 2017 FIFA Confederations Cup

=== New Zealand U-17 ===
Barbarouses captained New Zealand at the 2007 U-17 World Cup in Korea. He scored five goals, including a hat-trick, during the team's qualifying campaign to ensure progression to the finals.

=== New Zealand U-20 ===
As a member of the national Under-20 side he played an integral part in the 2008 OFC U-20 Championship qualification tournament for the 2009 Under-20 World Cup, scoring two goals in the three pool matches. New Zealand did not qualify for the final tournament.

=== Beijing 2008 ===
Barbarouses played for New Zealand at the 2008 OFC Men's Olympic Football Tournament. Although he scored four goals in the five pool matches at this 2008 Beijing Olympics qualifying tournament, Barbarouses was not selected for the final squad to travel to the Games.

=== 2010 World Cup ===
Barbarouses made his senior debut in a 2010 FIFA World Cup qualifier against Fiji on 19 November 2008. He trained with the national team before its World Cup qualifying play-off against Bahrain. Barbarouses attended a 12-day All Whites training camp in Auckland in April–May 2010 as a member of a 15-man squad of Australasian-based players. He was one of two forwards on the squad.

Barbarouses had stated that he would like to make the New Zealand 2010 FIFA World Cup squad. Although widely tipped to make the final 23-man squad travel to the 2010 FIFA World Cup, Barbarouses' name was missing when NZFA chairman Frank van Hattum read out the names at Auckland's Sky City on 10 May 2010. He was, however, named as one of seven non-travelling reserves.

=== 2011–current ===
A standout first season with then newly crowned A-League champions Brisbane Roar saw the 21-year-old striker included in the New Zealand squad for a friendly against China in Wuhan on 25 March 2011.

Barbarouses made the 23-man All Whites squad, where played against Mexico at altitude in Denver on 2 June and against Australia in Adelaide on 5 June.

Barbarouses formed part of an 18-man All Whites squad that played Jamaica in an international friendly at Mt Smart Stadium in Auckland, New Zealand, on 29 February 2012.

On 23 May 2012, Barbarouses scored his first goal for the All Whites in a friendly match against El Salvador. His 64th-minute half-volley from close range levelled the scores and the match resulted in a 2–2 draw.

He played for New Zealand at the 2012 Summer Olympics.

Barbarouses was also selected as a member of the All Whites squad for the June 2017 friendly vs Japan.

Barbarouses was a member of New Zealands Qualification campaign for the 2018 World Cup in Russia. He played in both the home and away matches vs Peru in November 2017 as New Zealand ultimately were unsuccessful in their qualification bid.

On 14 May 2026, he was named in the 26-man squad for the 2026 FIFA World Cup.

== Career statistics ==
=== Club ===
As of match played 20 November 2026

Appearances and goals by club, season and competition
Club	Season	League			Cup		Continental		Other		Total	
Club	Season	Division	Apps	Goals	Apps	Goals	Apps	Goals	Apps	Goals	Apps	Goals
Team Wellington	2006–07	NZ Premiership	14	3	—		—		—		14	3
Wellington Phoenix	2007–08	A-League	3	0	—		—		—		3	0
Wellington Phoenix	2008–09	A-League	5	1	—		—		—		5	1
Wellington Phoenix	2009–10	A-League	13	1	—		—		—		13	1
Wellington Phoenix	Total		21	2	—		—		—		21	2
Macarthur Rams (loan)	2008	NSW Premier League	9	1	—		—		—		9	1
Brisbane Roar	2010–11	A-League	30	11	—		—		3 (Note: Appearances in A-League Finals)	1	33	12
Alania Vladikavkaz	2011–12	Russian FNL	13	2	—		1 (Note: Appearance in UEFA Europa League)	0	—		14	2
Panathinaikos (loan)	2012–13	Super League Greece	11	0	4	0	—		—		15	0
Melbourne Victory	2013–14	A-League	22	4	—		6 (Note: Appearances in AFC Champions League)	2	2	0	30	6
Melbourne Victory	2014–15	A-League	23	5	3	1	—		2	2	28	8
Melbourne Victory	2015–16	A-League	23	6	4	3	8	1	1	0	36	10
Melbourne Victory	Total		68	15	7	4	14	3	5	2	94	24
Wellington Phoenix	2016–17	A-League	25	5	1	1	—		1	0	27	6
Melbourne Victory	2017–18	A-League	22	8	2	0	5	2	3	2	32	12
Melbourne Victory	2018–19	A-League	27	14	2	1	4	0	1	1	34	16
Melbourne Victory	Total		49	22	4	1	9	2	4	3	66	28
Sydney FC	2019–20	A-League	26	8	1	0	6	0	2	0	35	8
Sydney FC	2020–21	A-League	27	9	— (Note: FFA Cup was cancelled due to COVID-19)		—		2	1	29	10
Sydney FC	2021–22	A-League Men	11	1	1	0	3	0	—		15	1
Sydney FC	Total		64	18	2	0	9	0	4	1	79	19
Wellington Phoenix	2022–23	A-League Men	24	2	3	1	—		0	0	27	4
Wellington Phoenix	2023–24	A-League Men	26	13	2	0	—		2	0	30	13
Wellington Phoenix	2024–25	A-League Men	25	10	2 (Note: One appearance in 2024 Australia Cup; one appearance and one goal in 2025 Australia Cup)	1	—		—		27	11
Wellington Phoenix	Total		75	25	7	2	—		2	0	84	27
Western Sydney Wanderers	2025–26	A-League Men	22	4	2	1	—		—		24	5
South Melbourne	2026	NPL Victoria	—		—		—		6 (Note: Appearances in Australian Championship)	0	6	0
Career total			335	105	25	8	33	5	25	7	418	125

=== International ===
As of match played 6 June 2026. New Zealand score listed first, score column indicates score after each Barbarouses goal.

Appearances and goals by national team and year
National team	Year	Apps	Goals
New Zealand U17	2007	6	5
New Zealand U20	2008	3	2
New Zealand U23	2008	5	4
New Zealand U23	2012	3	0
New Zealand U23	Total	8	4
New Zealand	2008	1	0
New Zealand	2009	0	0
New Zealand	2010	0	0
New Zealand	2011	3	0
New Zealand	2012	13	2
New Zealand	2013	7	0
New Zealand	2014	4	0
New Zealand	2015	1	0
New Zealand	2016	8	0
New Zealand	2017	10	1
New Zealand	2018	0	0
New Zealand	2019	0	0
New Zealand	2020	0	0
New Zealand	2021	0	0
New Zealand	2022	5	0
New Zealand	2023	2	0
New Zealand	2024	11	3
New Zealand	2025	7	2
New Zealand	2026	4	1
New Zealand	Total	76	10
Career total		93	21

List of international goals scored by Kosta Barbarouses
No.	Date	Venue	Cap	Opponent	Score	Result	Competition
1	23 May 2012	BBVA Compass Stadium, Houston, United States	6	El Salvador	2–2	2–2	Friendly
2	11 September 2012	North Harbour Stadium, Auckland, New Zealand	14	Solomon Islands	2–0	6–1	2014 FIFA World Cup qualification
3	31 May 2016	Sir John Guise Stadium, Port Moresby, Papua New Guinea	30	Vanuatu	5–0	5–0	2016 OFC Nations Cup
4	1 September 2017	North Harbour Stadium, Auckland, New Zealand	43	Solomon Islands	3–0	6–1	2018 FIFA World Cup qualification
5	18 June 2024	VFF Freshwater Stadium, Port Vila, Vanuatu	57	Solomon Islands	3–0	3–0	2024 OFC Nations Cup
6	27 June 2024	VFF Freshwater Stadium, Port Vila, Vanuatu	59	Tahiti	3–0	5–0	2024 OFC Nations Cup
7	27 June 2024	VFF Freshwater Stadium, Port Vila, Vanuatu	59	Tahiti	5–0	5–0	2024 OFC Nations Cup
8	21 March 2025	Sky Stadium, Wellington, New Zealand	66	Fiji	7–0	7–0	2026 FIFA World Cup qualification
9	24 March 2025	Eden Park, Auckland, New Zealand	67	New Caledonia	2–0	3–0	2026 FIFA World Cup qualification
10	30 March 2026	Eden Park, Auckland, New Zealand	74	Chile	1–0	4–1	2026 FIFA Series

== Honours ==
Brisbane Roar

- A-League Premiership: 2010–11
- A-League Championship: 2010–11

Melbourne Victory

- A-League Premiership: 2014–15
- A-League Championship: 2014–15, 2017–18
- FFA Cup: 2015

Sydney FC

- A-League Premiership: 2019–20
- A-League Championship: 2019–20

New Zealand

- OFC Nations Cup: 2008, 2016, 2024

New Zealand U17

- OFC U-17 Championship: 2007

Individual

- PFA A-League Team of the Season: 2010–11, 2015–16, 2023–24
- Mark Viduka Medal: 2015
- Wellington Phoenix Player of the Year: 2016–17, 2023–24, 2024–25
- A-League Men Player of the Month: December 2023, January 2024
- OFC Men's Nations Cup Silver Ball: 2024
- OFC Men's Nations Cup Bronze Boot: 2024
