= Fin Roa Conchie =

New Zealand footballer (born 2003)

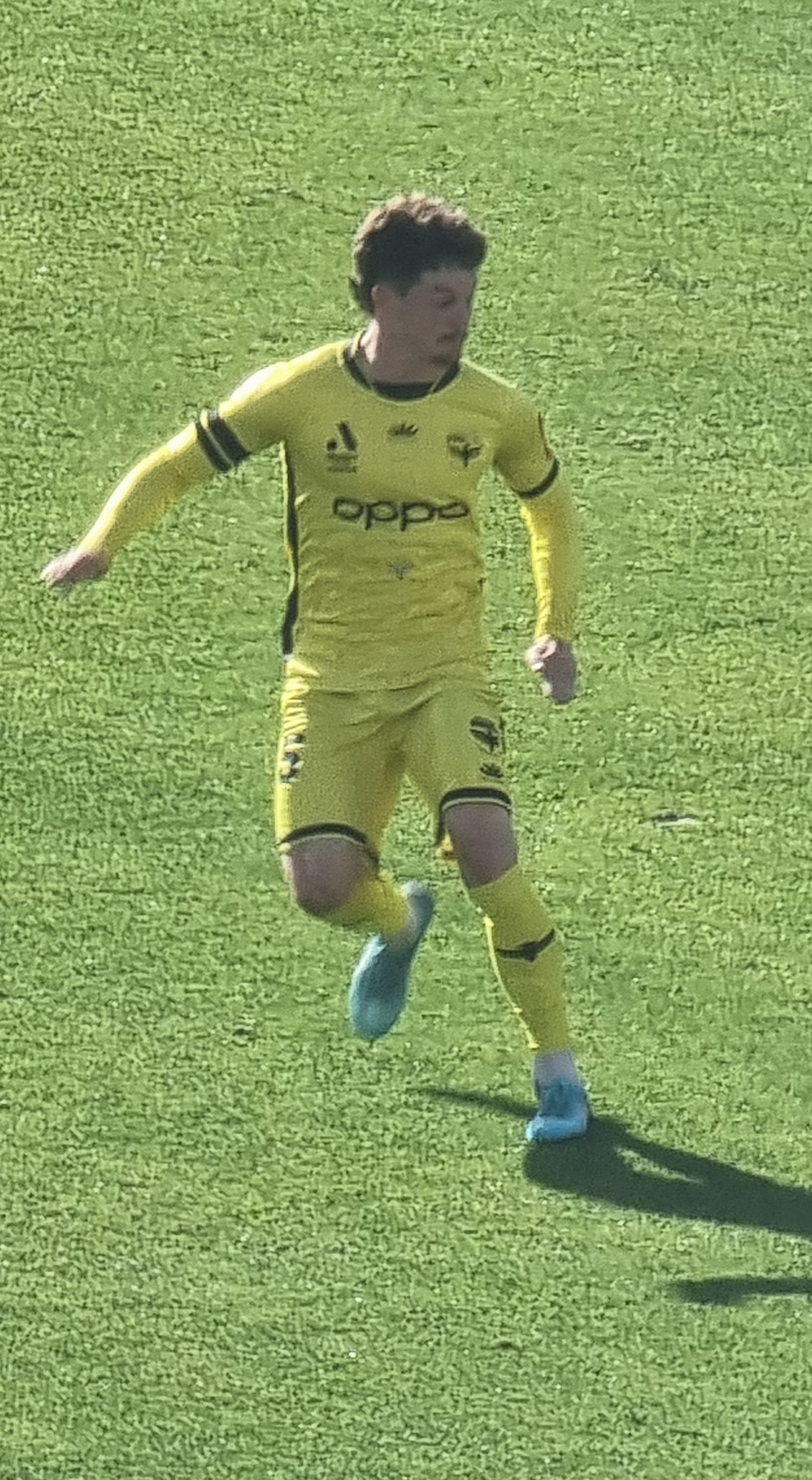
- Conchie playing for the Wellington Phoenix in 2024.

Personal information
- Full name: Fin Ngahina Roa Conchie
- Date of birth: 10 August 2003 (age 23)
- Place of birth: Hamilton, New Zealand
- Height: 1.76 m (5 ft 9 in)
- Position: Midfielder

Team information
- Current team: Wellington Phoenix
- Number: 6

Youth career
- –2023: Wellington Phoenix Reserves

Senior career*
Years	Team	Apps	(Gls)
2023–	Wellington Phoenix	38	(0)
2022–	Wellington Phoenix Reserves	47	(0)

International career^{‡}
2022–2023	New Zealand U-20	13	(1)
2023–	New Zealand U-23	2	(0)
Medal record
Men's football
Representing New Zealand
OFC Nations Cup
Winner	2024 Fiji/Vanuatu
- * Club domestic league appearances and goals as of 17 April 2026 ‡ National team caps and goals as of 07:35, 18 November 2023 (UTC)

Fin Ngahina Roa Conchie (Māori: [ŋaːhina ɾɔa]; born 10 August 2003) is a New Zealand association footballer currently playing as a midfielder for the Wellington Phoenix in the A-League Men.

== Career ==
Roa Conchie rose through the ranks of the juniors system at Wellington Phoenix. Whilst playing for the Wellington Phoenix FC Reserves against Petone in the 2023 New Zealand National League, Roa Conchie made a homophobic slur towards a Petone player, resulting in an altercation on the field. Whilst Roa Conchie was not sanctioned by the referee for the incident during the game, he later admitted to making the slur. He was stood down indefinitely by Wellington, and would later receive a 10-game ban. Wellington Phoenix stood by Roa Conchie and signed him to a 3-year contract. He would go on to make his professional debut against the Western Sydney Wanderers in Round 3 of the 2023–24 season.

On 18 June 2026, the Wellington Phoenix announced the re-signing of Roa Conchie for the 2026–27 season.

== Career statistics ==
=== Club ===
As of match played on 4 November 2023.

Appearances and goals by club, season and competition
Club	Season	League			Cup		Others		Total	
Club	Season	Division	Apps	Goals	Apps	Goals	Apps	Goals	Apps	Goals
Wellington Phoenix Reserves	2022	National League	25 (Note: 18 appearances in Central League. 7 appearances in New Zealand National League)	0	—		—		25	0
Wellington Phoenix Reserves	2023	National League	12 (Note: Appearances in Central League)	0	—		—		12	0
Wellington Phoenix Reserves	Total		37	0	0	0	—		37	0
Wellington Phoenix	2023–24	A-League Men	1	0	0	0	—		1	0
Career total			38	0	0	0	—		38	0

== Honours ==
New Zealand

- OFC Nations Cup: 2024
