= Joshua Rudland =

New Zealand footballer

Personal information
- Full name: Joshua David Rennie Rudland
- Date of birth: 14 October 2003 (age 23)
- Place of birth: New Zealand
- Position: Striker

Team information
- Current team: Wellington Olympic
- Number: 28

Youth career
- –2017: FC Nelson
- 2018: Wairarapa United
- 2019–2020: Tasman United
- 2021–2024: Wellington Phoenix FC Reserves

Senior career*
Years	Team	Apps	(Gls)
2019–2020	Wairarapa United	31	(10)
2019–2020	Tasman United	1	(0)
2021	North Wellington	4	(0)
2021–2024	Wellington Phoenix Reserves	31	(17)
2023–2024	Wellington Phoenix	0	(0)
2024–	Wellington Olympic	1	(0)
- * Club domestic league appearances and goals as of 11 January 2025

Joshua Rudland (born 14 October 2003) is a New Zealand association footballer who currently plays for Wellington Olympic in the New Zealand National League.

== Career ==
Having performed well for the Wellington Phoenix FC Reserves in the Central League, new Wellington Phoenix manager Giancarlo Italiano named Rudland as part of a young squad that would travel to Brisbane for the Round of 32 2023 Australia Cup fixture against National Premier Leagues Queensland club Peninsula Power FC. Rudland made his senior professional debut in the second half of the match with the score tied at 1-1. With the game having gone deep into extra time, Rudland scored in the 119th minute to put the Phoenix up 2–1, sealing the clubs advance through to the competitions Round of 16.

In 2024, Rudland joined Wellington Olympic.
