= A-League Men Player of the Month =

Australian association football award

The A-League Player of the Month is an association football award that recognises the best adjudged A-League player each month of the season. The winner is chosen by combination of an online public vote.

== Key ==
- Position key: GK – Goalkeeper; DF – Defender; MF – Midfielder; FW – Forward.

== List of winners ==
Month	Year	Player	Nationality	Pos.	Club	Ref.
October	2019	Daniel Lopar	Switzerland	GK	Western Sydney Wanderers	
November	2019	Ulises Dávila	Mexico	FW	Wellington Phoenix	
December	2019	Cameron Devlin	Australia	MF	Wellington Phoenix	
January	2020	Gregory Wüthrich	Switzerland	DF	Perth Glory	
February	2020	David Ball	England	FW	Wellington Phoenix	
December	2022	Carlo Armiento	Australia	MF	Brisbane Roar	
January	2023	Oskar Zawada	Poland	FW	Wellington Phoenix	
February	2023	Brandon Borrello	Australia	FW	Western Sydney Wanderers	
March	2023	Luka Jovanovic	Australia	FW	Adelaide United	
April	2023	Marco Túlio	Brazil	MF	Central Coast Mariners	
October/November	2023	Alex Paulsen	New Zealand	GK	Wellington Phoenix	
December	2023	Kosta Barbarouses	New Zealand	FW	Wellington Phoenix	
January	2024	Kosta Barbarouses	New Zealand	FW	Wellington Phoenix	
February	2024	Isaac Hughes	New Zealand	DF	Wellington Phoenix	
March	2024	Alex Paulsen	New Zealand	GK	Wellington Phoenix	
April	2024	Mikael Doka	Brazil	MF	Central Coast Mariners	
October/November	2024	Nicolas Milanovic	Australia	FW	Western Sydney Wanderers	
December	2024	Francis de Vries	New Zealand	DF	Auckland FC	
January	2025	Noah Botic	Australia	FW	Western United	
February	2025	Neyder Moreno	Colombia	MF	Auckland FC	
March	2025	Nishan Velupillay	Australia	FW	Melbourne Victory	
April/May	2025	Jaylan Pearman	Australia	FW	Perth Glory	
October/November	2025	Youstin Salas	Costa Rica	MF	Brisbane Roar	
December	2025	Francis de Vries	New Zealand	DF	Auckland FC	

== Awards won by nationality ==
Nationality	Players	Wins
Australia	8	8
New Zealand	4	7
Brazil	2	2
Switzerland	2	2
Colombia	1	1
Costa Rica	1	1
England	1	1
Mexico	1	1
Poland	1	1

== Awards won by position ==
Position	Players	Wins
Forward	10	11
Midfielder	6	6
Defender	3	4
Goalkeeper	1	2

== Awards won by club ==
Club	Players	Wins
Wellington Phoenix	7	9
Auckland FC	2	3
Western Sydney Wanderers	3	3
Central Coast Mariners	2	2
Perth Glory	2	2
Adelaide United	1	1
Brisbane Roar	1	1
Melbourne Victory	1	1
Western United	1	1

== See also ==
- A-League Men Coach of the Month
