= Mark Jackson (footballer, born 1977) =

English footballer (born 1977)

Personal information
- Full name: Mark Graham Jackson
- Date of birth: 30 September 1977 (age 49)
- Place of birth: Leeds, England
- Position: Defender

Team information
- Current team: Lion City Sailors (head coach)

Youth career
- –1995: Leeds United

Senior career*
Years	Team	Apps	(Gls)
1995–2000	Leeds United	19	(0)
1998	→ Huddersfield Town (loan)	5	(0)
2000	→ Barnsley (loan)	1	(0)
2000–2005	Scunthorpe United	136	(4)
2005–2006	Kidderminster Harriers	39	(3)
2006–2007	Rochdale	24	(0)
2007–2010	Farsley Celtic	31	(1)
2010–2015	Farsley		

International career
1997	England U20	4	(0)

Managerial career
- 2022–2023: Milton Keynes Dons
- 2023–2025: Central Coast Mariners
- 2025–2026: Buriram United
- 2026–: Lion City Sailors
- * Club domestic league appearances and goals

Mark Graham Jackson (born 30 September 1977) is an English football manager and former player who is currently the head coach of Singapore Premier League club Lion City Sailors.

A former defender, he notably played for Scunthorpe United. At international level, he made four appearances for the England U20 national team.

== Playing career ==
As a player Jackson started his career at Leeds United. He turned professional in July 1995 and soon earned a Premiership debut.

Jackson played for Scunthorpe United between 2000 and 2005, making 159 appearances for the club. Jackson joined Kidderminster Harriers in February 2005, before moving on to Rochdale alongside Harriers teammate Iyseden Christie in January 2006.

Jackson joined Football Conference club Farsley Celtic in summer 2007, and would later play for the reformed FC Farsley.

== Managerial career ==
=== Leeds United ===
On 10 November 2015, Jackson rejoined his hometown club Leeds United as the under 15/16s coach, rejoining his then former Leeds academy manager Paul Hart at the club.

On 24 June 2016, Jackson was promoted to under-18s co-manager alongside Andy Gray as part of Leeds' academy structure before taking the helm as the sole manager for the 2017–18 season.

In April 2018, his Leeds under-18 side finished the 2017–18 season in first place, thus winning the Professional Development Northern League title.

On 14 September 2020, he was promoted to under-23s head coach, replacing Carlos Corberan who had left the role in the summer to take up a position as head coach at Huddersfield Town.

In May 2021, his under-23s team won the Premier League 2 Division 2, earning promotion to Division 1, in both his first season managing this age group and the team's first season of playing in that division. The team remained unbeaten at home throughout the entire season.

On 3 March 2022, Jackson was promoted to first team coach under new Leeds United head coach Jesse Marsch.

=== Milton Keynes Dons ===
On 23 December 2022, Jackson was appointed head coach of League One club Milton Keynes Dons. At the time of his appointment, the club were sitting in 22nd position, three points from safety. His first game in charge came three days later where his side won 1–0, a first home league win for the Dons in over four months.

On 9 May 2023, Jackson was sacked by MK Dons after relegation to League Two, having registered six wins in 25 games.

=== Central Coast Mariners ===
On 27 September 2023, Jackson was announced as the new coach of reigning A-League champions, Central Coast Mariners, ahead of their title defence. In his first season at the helm, Jackson steer the club to a successful treble in which they won the 2023–24 AFC Cup and 2023–24 A-League premiership for finishing top of the table during the regular season.

On 25 May 2024, Jackson's squad defeated Melbourne Victory 3–1 at extra time in the 2024 A-League Men Grand Final to become back-to-back champions. Before the game, Jackson was also awarded the Isuzu UTE A-League Coach of the Year award.

Jackson's second season in charge of the Mariners was more of a struggle, as Jackson was faced with a significant reduction of funding for the club. The team finished 10th out of 13 teams in the 2024–25 season. Jackson departed the Mariners before the beginning of the 2025–26 season, to pursue an overseas coaching opportunity.

=== Buriram United ===
In October 2025, Jackson was appointed manager of reigning Thai League 1 Champions Buriram United. Jackson than guided Buriram United to win a treble in which they won the 2025–26 Thai League 1 title, 2025–26 Thai FA Cup and the 2025–26 ASEAN Club Championship. However, on 5 September 2026, Jackson resigned as the club head coach right before the start of the 2026–27 Thai League 1 season.

=== Lion City Sailors ===
On 9 September 2026, Jackson was recruited by Singapore Premier League club Lion City Sailors as their head coach.

== Managerial statistics ==
As of match played 22 November 2026

Managerial record by team and tenure
Team	Nat.	From	To	Record								Ref.
Team	Nat.	From	To	G	W	D	L	GF	GA	GD	Win %	Ref.
Milton Keynes Dons	(England)	23 December 2022	9 May 2023	25	6	9	10	23	35	−12	24.00	
Central Coast Mariners	(Australia)	27 September 2023	10 October 2025	88	35	22	31	143	110	+33	39.77	
Buriram United	(Thailand)	15 October 2025	5 September 2026	49	33	8	8	128	41	+87	67.35	
Lion City Sailors	(Singapore)	13 September 2026	Present	10	8	1	1	32	3	+29	80.00	
Career Total				172	82	40	50	326	189	+137	47.67	

== Honours ==
=== Manager ===
Central Coast Mariners

- A-League Men Premiership: 2023–24
- A-League Men Championship: 2023–24
- AFC Cup: 2023–24

Buriram United

- Thai League 1: 2025–26
- Thai FA Cup: 2025–26
- ASEAN Club Championship: 2025–26
