= Cammy Devlin =

Australian footballer (born 1998)

Cameron Devlin
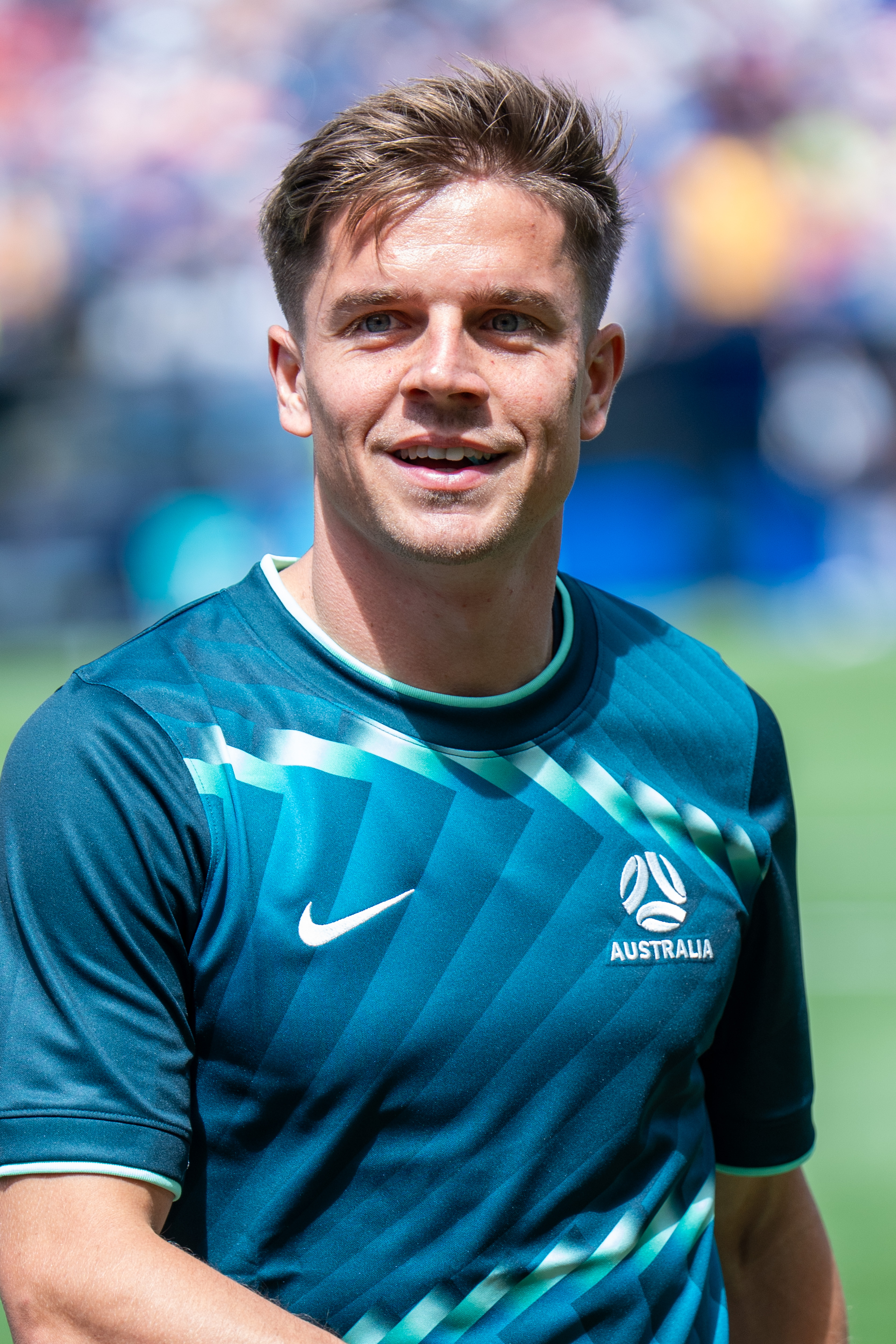
- Devlin with Australia in 2026

Personal information
- Full name: Cameron Peter Devlin
- Date of birth: 7 June 1998 (age 28)
- Place of birth: Sydney, New South Wales, Australia
- Height: 1.71 m (5 ft 7 in)
- Position: Defensive midfielder

Team information
- Current team: Rangers
- Number: 14

Youth career
- Sutherland Sharks
- 2015–2016: Western Sydney Wanderers

Senior career*
Years	Team	Apps	(Gls)
2015	Sutherland Sharks	4	(0)
2016–2017	Western Sydney Wanderers NPL	29	(3)
2017–2019	Sydney FC NPL	13	(1)
2018–2019	Sydney FC	7	(1)
2019–2021	Wellington Phoenix	44	(1)
2019	Wellington Phoenix Reserves	2	(0)
2021	Newcastle Jets	0	(0)
2021–2026	Heart of Midlothian	133	(5)
2026–	Rangers	5	(0)

International career^{‡}
2015	Australia U20	1	(0)
2021	Australia U23	2	(0)
2022–	Australia	5	(0)
- * Club domestic league appearances and goals as of 21:55, 9 September 2026 (UTC) ‡ National team caps and goals as of 7 June 2026

Cameron Peter Devlin (born 7 June 1998) is an Australian professional soccer player who plays as a defensive midfielder for Scottish Premiership club Rangers and the Australia national team.

Born in Sydney, Devlin began his career as youth with local sides Sutherland Sharks, Western Sydney Wanderers and Sydney. He has subsequently played for Wellington Phoenix, Newcastle Jets and Heart of Midlothian.

Devlin has represented Australia at under 20, under 23 and at full international level.

== Club career ==
=== Sydney FC ===
After playing most of his elite youth with the Western Sydney Wanderers NPL team (29 games), Devlin got a call up to play for Sydney FC in the 2018–19 A-League season, making seven appearances off the bench including an AFC Champions League appearance against Kawasaki Frontale. He scored his first professional goal on 1 March 2019 in a 2–0 win over Adelaide.

=== Wellington Phoenix ===
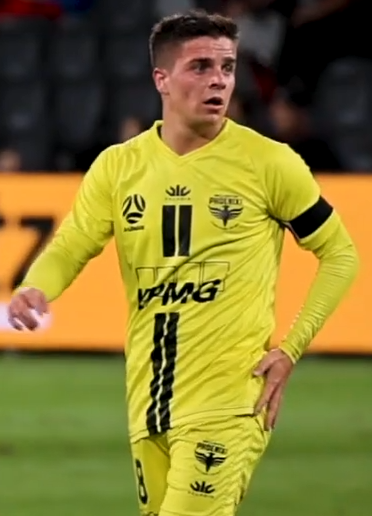
Devlin playing for Wellington Phoenix in 2021

On 4 July 2019, Devlin signed a two-year deal with the Wellington Phoenix after turning down a contract to stay with Sydney. In his first few months, Devlin only made sporadic appearances off the bench alongside two appearances for the reserve team.

On 14 December 2019, following an injury to regular midfielder Alex Rufer, Devlin made his starting debut for the Phoenix in a 0–0 draw with Melbourne Victory; he quickly became an integral player for the team, being named A-League Player of the Month for December and retaining his starting spot even when Rufer recovered.

=== Heart of Midlothian ===
On 28 June 2021, it was announced that Devlin had signed a two-year deal with the Newcastle Jets. However, by August 2021 a transfer fee had been agreed with the Jets for Devlin to join Scottish Premiership club Heart of Midlothian, subject to the player securing a United Kingdom visa, which he did on 24 August.

=== Rangers ===
On 11 July 2026, Devlin signed for Rangers on a two-year deal, with the option of a further year.

== International career ==
=== Youth ===
In October 2015, Devlin was selected for the Australia under-20 team to play in 2016 AFC U-19 Championship qualification. He made his youth international debut on 4 October 2015, playing in a win over Laos.

Devlin was initially named as a reserve players for the Australian under-23 side at the 2020 Olympics in Tokyo. He was added to the Australian Olympic squad after the International Olympic Committee expanded squad sizes for the tournament.

Devlin made one appearance at the 2020 Olympic Games, coming on as a late substitute as Australia lost 2–0 to Egypt.

=== Senior ===
Devlin was called up to the Australian senior side for the first time in September 2022 for two friendly matches against New Zealand in the leadup to the 2022 FIFA World Cup. He came on for his senior international debut as a second-half substitute in the second game on 25 September 2022, in Auckland.

On 8 November 2022, it was announced that Devlin was included in the Australian squad for the 2022 FIFA World Cup in Qatar. Devlin did not take the field in the tournament for Australia, who were eliminated by Argentina in the round of sixteen.

On 31 May 2026, Devlin was selected in the 26-man squad for the 2026 FIFA World Cup.

== Career statistics ==
As of 20 August 2026

Appearances and goals by club, season and competition
Club	Season	League			Cup		Continental		Others		Total	
Club	Season	Division	Apps	Goals	Apps	Goals	Apps	Goals	Apps	Goals	Apps	Goals
Sydney FC	2018–19	A-League	7	1	1 (Note: Appearances in FFA Cup)	0	1 (Note: Appearances in AFC Champions League)	0	—		9	1
Wellington Phoenix Reserves	2019–20	ISPS Handa Premiership	2	0	—		—		—		2	0
Wellington Phoenix	2019–20	A-League	20	0	1	1	—		1 (Note: Appearances in A-League Finals)	0	22	1
Wellington Phoenix	2020–21	A-League	23	1	— (Note: 2020 FFA Cup was cancelled due to COVID-19)		—		—		23	1
Wellington Phoenix	Total		45	1	1	1	–		1	0	47	2
Heart of Midlothian	2021–22	Scottish Premiership	25	1	4	0	—		—		29	1
Heart of Midlothian	2022–23	Scottish Premiership	30	1	3	1	7	0	—		40	2
Heart of Midlothian	2023–24	Scottish Premiership	24	1	3	0	4	2	—		31	3
Heart of Midlothian	2024–25	Scottish Premiership	27	0	4	0	8	0	—		39	0
Heart of Midlothian	2025–26	Scottish Premiership	27	2	5	0	0	0	—		32	2
Heart of Midlothian	Total		133	5	19	1	19	2	–		171	8
Rangers	2026–27	Scottish Premiership	2	0	0	0	3	0	—		5	0
Career total			190	7	21	2	23	2	1	0	235	11

== Honours ==
Sydney FC

- A-League Championship: 2019
- FFA Cup runner-up: 2018

Individual

- A-League Men Player of the Month: December 2019
