= Oskar Zawada =

Polish footballer (born 1996)

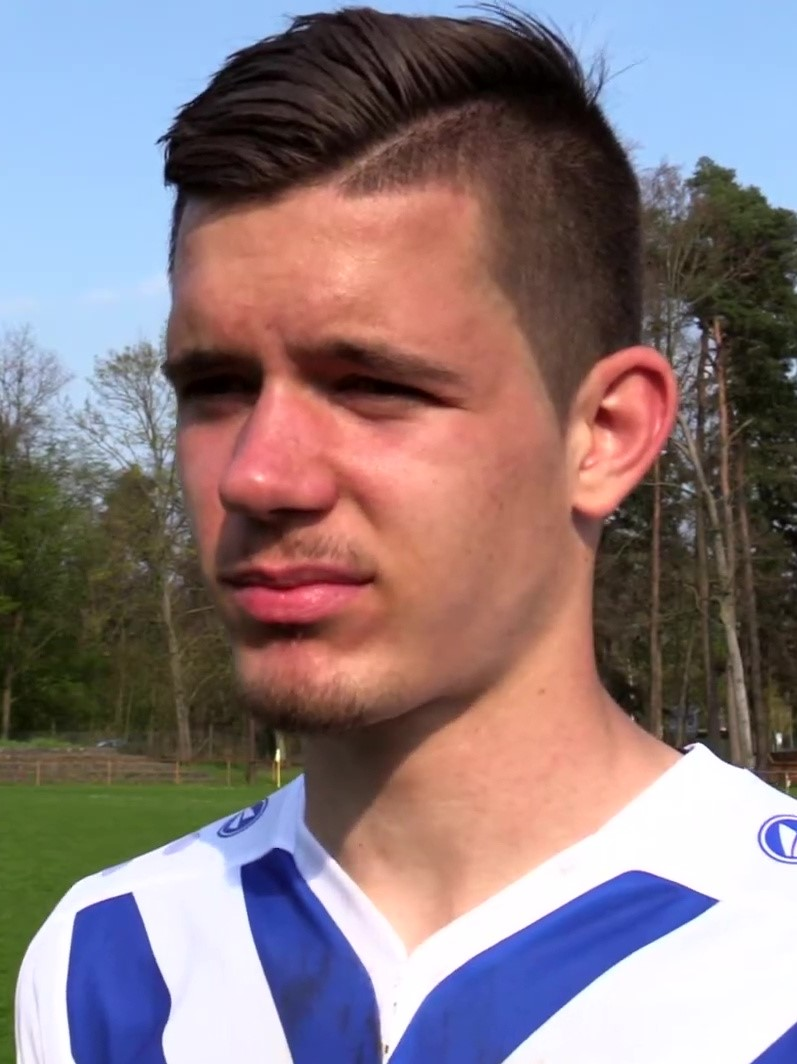
- Zawada with Karlsruher SC in 2017

Personal information
- Full name: Oskar Zawada
- Date of birth: 1 February 1996 (age 30)
- Place of birth: Olsztyn, Poland
- Height: 1.92 m (6 ft 4 in)
- Position: Forward

Team information
- Current team: Groningen
- Number: 19

Youth career
- DKS Dobre Miasto
- 2009–2011: OKS 1945 Olsztyn
- 2011–2012: DKS Dobre Miasto
- 2012–2014: VfL Wolfsburg

Senior career*
Years	Team	Apps	(Gls)
2014–2017	VfL Wolfsburg II	23	(3)
2015–2016	VfL Wolfsburg	0	(0)
2016–2017	→ FC Twente (loan)	11	(0)
2017–2018	Karlsruher SC	14	(2)
2018–2020	Wisła Płock	39	(6)
2020	→ Arka Gdynia (loan)	12	(1)
2020–2021	Raków Częstochowa	7	(1)
2021–2022	Jeju United	10	(0)
2022	Stal Mielec	10	(3)
2022–2024	Wellington Phoenix	40	(22)
2024–2025	RKC Waalwijk	26	(9)
2025–	Groningen	16	(3)

International career
2010	Poland U15	1	(0)
2012	Poland U16	1	(0)
2012–2013	Poland U17	8	(3)
2013–2014	Poland U18	7	(2)
2014–2015	Poland U19	11	(4)
2015–2017	Poland U20	8	(2)
2016–2017	Poland U21	4	(0)
- * Club domestic league appearances and goals as of 9 March 2026 (UTC)

Oskar Zawada (born 1 February 1996) is a Polish professional footballer who plays as a forward for Eredivisie club FC Groningen.

== Club career ==
Zawada started his career at his local club, DKS Dobre Miasto. Later he moved to OKS 1945 Olsztyn. In 2012, he joined German club VfL Wolfsburg, aged 16. Two years later he made his senior debut for the reserve team.

In January 2016, he joined Dutch club FC Twente on a loan. On 26 January 2017, he was identified as surplus to requirements at VfL Wolfsburg and was sold to 2. Bundesliga side Karlsruher SC for an undisclosed fee.

In December 2017, it was announced that Zawada would join Polish Ekstraklasa club Wisła Płock for the second half of the 2017–18 season.

In October 2020, he joined the Polish Ekstraklasa club Raków Częstochowa.

In March 2022, following a short-lived stint at Korean side Jeju United, he joined Polish club Stal Mielec until the end of June.

In August 2022, he joined A-League side Wellington Phoenix (a New Zealand-based side) on a two-year contract. Zawada enjoyed his most successful season to date during the 2022–23 campaign, scoring a career-high 15 goals for the club. He followed it up with 7 goals in 14 league games in the 2023–24 season, during which Zawada saw limited playing time due to injuries.

On 4 July 2024, Zawada returned to Dutch football by joining Eredivisie club RKC Waalwijk on a two-year deal.

On 11 July 2025, Zawada signed a three-year contract with another Eredivisie side FC Groningen.

== Career statistics ==
As of match played 7 March 2026

Appearances and goals by club, season and competition
Club	Season	League			National cup (Note: Includes DFB-Pokal, Polish Cup, Australia Cup, KNVB Cup)		Continental		Other		Total	
Club	Season	Division	Apps	Goals	Apps	Goals	Apps	Goals	Apps	Goals	Apps	Goals
VfL Wolfsburg II	2013–14	Regionalliga	1	0	—		—		—		1	0
VfL Wolfsburg II	2014–15	Regionalliga	8	1	—		—		—		8	1
VfL Wolfsburg II	2015–16	Regionalliga	4	2	—		—		—		4	2
VfL Wolfsburg II	2016–17	Regionalliga	10	0	—		—		—		10	0
VfL Wolfsburg II	Total		23	3	—		—		—		23	3
VfL Wolfsburg	2015–16	Bundesliga	0	0	0	0	0	0	0	0	0	0
FC Twente (loan)	2015–16	Eredivisie	11	0	—		—		—		11	0
Karlsruher SC	2016–17	2. Bundesliga	8	2	—		—		—		8	2
Karlsruher SC	2017–18	3. Liga	6	0	1	0	—		—		7	0
Karlsruher SC	Total		14	2	1	0	—		—		15	2
Wisła Płock	2017–18	Ekstraklasa	9	0	—		—		—		9	0
Wisła Płock	2018–19	Ekstraklasa	23	6	3	1	—		—		26	7
Wisła Płock	2019–20	Ekstraklasa	7	0	2	1	—		—		9	1
Wisła Płock	Total		39	6	5	2	—		—		44	8
Arka Gdynia (loan)	2019–20	Ekstraklasa	12	1	—		—		—		12	1
Raków Częstochowa	2020–21	Ekstraklasa	7	1	1	0	—		—		8	1
Jeju United	2021	K League 1	10	0	—		—		—		10	0
Stal Mielec	2021–22	Ekstraklasa	10	3	—		—		—		10	3
Wellington Phoenix	2022–23	A-League	26	15	2	0	—		—		28	15
Wellington Phoenix	2023–24	A-League	14	7	—		—		—		14	7
Wellington Phoenix	Total		40	22	2	0	—		—		42	22
RKC Waalwijk	2024–25	Eredivisie	26	9	3	2	—		—		29	11
Groningen	2025–26	Eredivisie	16	3	1	0	—		0	0	17	3
Career total			208	50	13	4	0	0	0	0	221	54

== Honours ==
Raków Częstochowa

- Polish Cup: 2020–21

Individual

- A-League Men Player of the Month: January 2023
- Wellington Phoenix Player of the Year: 2022–23
- Wellington Phoenix Players' Player of the Year: 2022–23
- Eredivisie Team of the Month: December 2024
