= Giancarlo Italiano =

Australian soccer player and manager (born 1983)

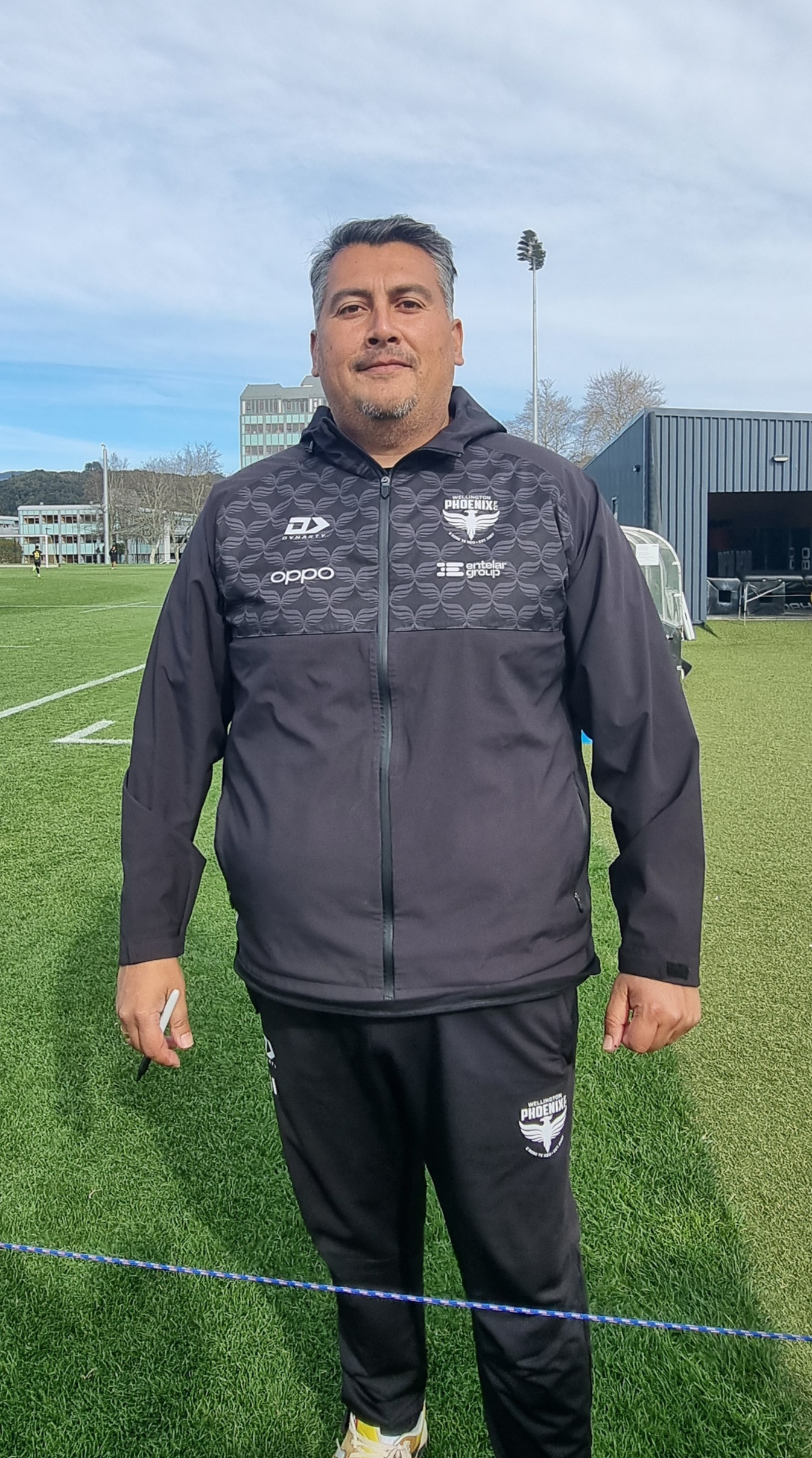
- Italiano in 2025.

Personal information
- Date of birth: 31 January 1983 (age 43)
- Place of birth: Sydney, New South Wales, Australia

Managerial career
- Years: Team
- 2015–2016: Blacktown City (sporting director)
- 2017–2019: Sydney FC NPL
- 2019–2020: Wellington Phoenix (chief analyst)
- 2019–2023: Wellington Phoenix (assistant)
- 2023–2026: Wellington Phoenix
- 2026–: Lee Man

Giancarlo Italiano (Italian: [dʒaŋˈkarlo itaˈljaːno]; born 31 January 1983) is an Australian association football manager. He is the current head coach of Hong Kong Premier League club Lee Man.

== Career ==
=== Early career ===
Italiano started his coaching career at NSW NPL club Blacktown City where he held the position of sporting director, during which the club won the 2015 National Premier League NSW season and the National Premier League Finals. Following this success he joined A-League Men club Sydney FC where he would work alongside Graham Arnold, Steve Corica, and Ufuk Talay whilst working with the Sydney FC academy set up.

When Talay departed Sydney FC in 2019 to become manager of New Zealand A-League Men side Wellington Phoenix, Italiano was one of the first people that Talay sought to bring across the Tasman, which Italiano was initially hesitant to do.

=== Wellington Phoenix ===
Italiano would join the Wellington based club as an analyst, before working closely with Talay, as he was announced to be an assistant coach for the Phoenix. As Italiano progressed through the club's coaching hierarchy, he completed his AFC Professional Coaching Diploma, a pre-requisite for managers to earn before they can become the head manager of a club in the Asian Football Confederation.

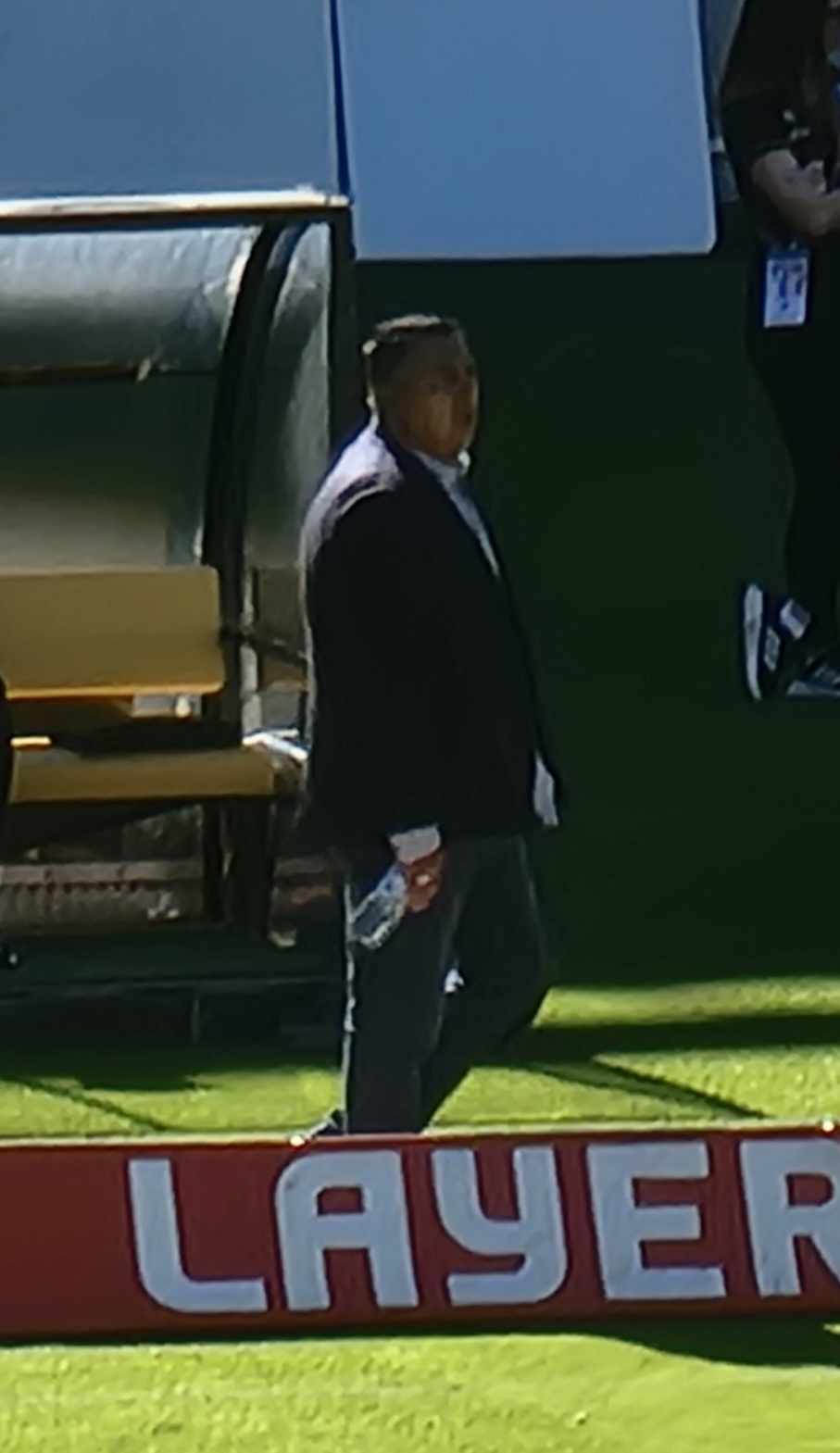
Italiano with Wellington Phoenix in 2024

Whilst assistant to Talay, Italiano made his debut as caretaker manager for the Phoenix during the COVID-19 disrupted 2021-22 A-League Men season when Talay caught the virus. Italiano took the reins for two matches against Perth Glory and Brisbane Roar, with Wellington winning both matches.

In 2023 after Talay announced he would vacate the position of manager at season's end, Italiano was announced to be Talay's successor, signing a 2-year contract extension He became the club's sixth manager since the team's inception in 2007, and the first A-League Men's manager not to have had a professional playing career prior to taking up management.

Italiano's first signing for the 2023–24 season was former Western Sydney Wanderers and Newcastle Jets player Mohamed Al-Taay, who had played under Italiano at Blacktown City. In Italiano's first season in charge, he guided the Phoenix to their highest league finish in club history, placing second with 15 wins and only four losses during the 2023–24 season. The Phoenix went on to lose 2–1 on aggregate to Melbourne Victory in the semi-finals at Sky Stadium.

During Italiano's second season in charge, Wellington Phoenix struggled to replicate the success of the previous campaign, experiencing a downturn in form following their record-setting 2023–24 season. The club lost all three New Zealand derby's to Auckland FC in their maiden season, including a 6–1 defeat. The Phoenix finished the 2024–25 season in 11th place, seven points clear of the wooden spoon. Despite the poor campaign, Italiano was handed a one-year contract extension during the season, with the director of football Shaun Gill stating that "It seems a lot of people in the sporting world have short memories," noting that he still held the highest win percentage in the club's history at the time.

On 21 February 2026, following a 5–0 home defeat to Auckland FC in the third derby of the 2025–26 season, Italiano resigned as head coach immediately after the match. He announced his decision during the post-match press conference, claiming responsibility for the result and that it was "unacceptable" with the season still in progress. The club confirmed his departure shortly afterwards.

=== Lee Man ===
On 17 June 2026, it was announced that Italiano had been appointed as the head coach of Hong Kong Premier League club Lee Man.

== Personal life ==
Italiano graduated from Rosebank College in 1996, and graduated from the University of Notre Dame Australia in 2021 with a Bachelor of Laws.

Born in Australia, Italiano's heritage is Peruvian and Italian. He supports Sampdoria in Serie A, and Nottingham Forest in the Premier League.

Italiano possesses a number of superstitions as manager: he does not watch penalties being taken because he thinks it is bad luck, he throws away his shirt whenever his team loses, he has to shake everyone’s hand whenever he enters a room, and he thinks it is bad luck to wish him good luck before a game and prefers well-wishers to say “go well” instead.

== Managerial statistics ==
As of 6 September 2026

Managerial record by team and tenure
| Team | Nat. | From | To | Record | | | | | | | | Ref. |
| Team | Nat. | From | To | G | W | D | L | GF | GA | GD | Win % | Ref. |
|---|---|---|---|---|---|---|---|---|---|---|---|---|
| Wellington Phoenix | (New Zealand) | 1 July 2023 | 21 February 2026 | 80 | 29 | 21 | 30 | 103 | 119 | −16 | 36.25 | |
| Lee Man | (Hong Kong) | 17 June 2026 | Present | 3 | 3 | 0 | 0 | 9 | 0 | +9 | 100.00 | |
| Career Total | | | | 83 | 32 | 21 | 30 | 112 | 119 | −7 | 38.55 | |

== Honours ==
Individual

- A-League Men Coach of the Month: October/November 2023
