= Youstin Salas =

Costa Rican footballer (born 1996)

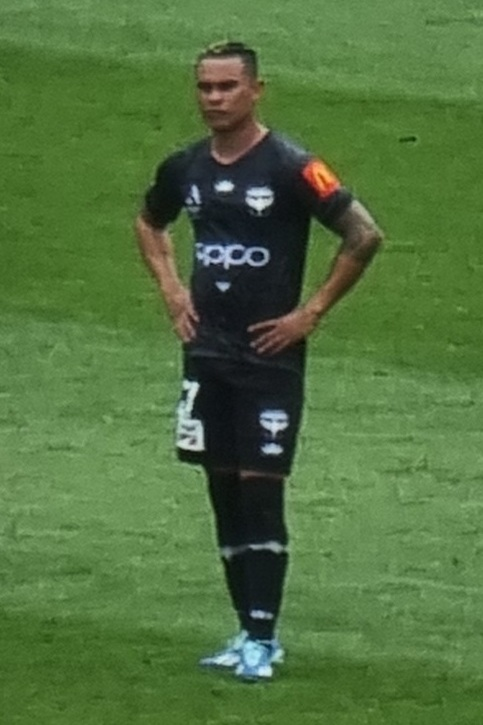
- Salas with Wellington Phoenix in 2024

Personal information
- Full name: Youstin Delfín Salas Gómez
- Date of birth: 17 June 1996 (age 30)
- Place of birth: Cariari, Costa Rica
- Height: 1.73 m (5 ft 8 in)
- Positions: Midfielder; right-back

Team information
- Current team: Sporting San José

Senior career*
Years	Team	Apps	(Gls)
2014–2018	Santos de Guápiles	41	(2)
2018–2019	Herediano	6	(0)
2019	→ La U Universitarios (loan)	11	(0)
2020–2022	Municipal Grecia	88	(7)
2022–2025	Saprissa	77	(1)
2024	→ Wellington Phoenix (loan)	12	(0)
2025	→ Sporting San José (loan)	16	(0)
2025–	Sporting San José	5	(0)
2025–2026	→ Brisbane Roar (loan)	26	(1)

International career^{‡}
2012	Costa Rica U17	3	(0)
2021–2023	Costa Rica	7	(0)
- * Club domestic league appearances and goals as of 28 April 2026 ‡ National team caps and goals as of 8 September 2023

Youstin Delfín Salas Gómez (Latin American Spanish: [ˈjus.tin delˈfin ˈsa.las ˈɡo.mes]; born 17 June 1996) is a Costa Rican professional footballer who plays as a midfielder or right-back for Sporting San José.

== Early life ==
Salas was born in Cariari, Limón Province, Costa Rica, and began playing football at the age of six in El Progreso, Cariari, where his father coached a local team.

== Club career ==
=== Santos de Guápiles ===
Salas made his debut with Santos de Guápiles on 23 April 2014, in the final matchday of the 2014 Campeonato de Verano against La U Universitarios, starting for 60 minutes in a 3–0 defeat.

He made his international competition debut on 1 August 2017, in the first leg of the 2017 CONCACAF League round of 16 against San Juan Jabloteh of Trinidad and Tobago, a match in which he also scored his first goal in a 6–2 win.

=== Herediano and La U Universitarios ===
On 23 May 2018, Salas signed with Herediano. Later that year, he won the 2018 CONCACAF League title on 1 November, defeating Motagua on aggregate, and the 2018 Apertura on 23 December, with a victory over Saprissa.

On 27 May 2019, he was loaned to La U Universitarios along with four other players.

=== Municipal Grecia ===
On 13 December 2019, Salas joined Municipal Grecia.

=== Saprissa and Wellington Phoenix ===
On 30 June 2022, Salas signed with Saprissa on a contract through June 2025.

On 30 January 2024, he moved on loan to A-League Men side Wellington Phoenix for the remainder of the 2023–24 season, becoming the third Costa Rican to play for the club after Kenny Cunningham and Carlos Hernández. He made 12 appearances and provided one assist.

=== Sporting San José and Brisbane Roar ===
On 27 December 2024, Saprissa announced Salas's loan to Sporting San José for one year. The move was made permanent in July 2025, when Sporting signed him to a two-year contract.

On 15 September 2025, deadline day, Salas returned to the A-League Men by joining Brisbane Roar on a one-year loan. He was nominated A-League Player of the Month for October/November 2025.

== International career ==
=== Youth ===
On 5 December 2012, Salas was named in Edson Soto's Costa Rica under-17 squad for the 2013 CONCACAF U-17 Championship qualifiers. He did not feature in the opening match against Honduras (3–0 defeat), but appeared in the remaining games against El Salvador (2–1 win), Nicaragua (0–0 draw), and Guatemala (2–0 win). Costa Rica advanced to the final tournament after finishing second in the group.

=== Senior ===
Salas made his senior international debut for Costa Rica on 12 November 2021, in a 2022 FIFA World Cup qualifier against Canada (1–0 defeat), starting for 64 minutes before being substituted by Keysher Fuller. He was later named in Costa Rica's 26-man squad for the 2022 FIFA World Cup in Qatar, appearing in two matches.

On 30 August 2023, he was called up by head coach Claudio Vivas for a European tour with friendlies against Saudi Arabia and the United Arab Emirates. On 8 September, he played against Saudi Arabia, coming on at the start of the second half in a 3–1 win.

== Style of play ==
Primarily a defensive midfielder, Salas can also operate as a right-back or as an attacking midfielder.

== Honours ==
Herediano

- Liga FPD: 2018 Apertura
- CONCACAF League: 2018

Deportivo Saprissa

- Liga FPD: 2022 Apertura, 2023 Clausura, 2023 Apertura
- Supercopa de Costa Rica: 2023
- Recopa de Costa Rica: 2023

Individual

- 2015 Campeonato de Invierno Best Under-21 Breakthrough
