= 2023–24 A-League Men =

47th season of top-tier soccer league in Australia

A-League Men
- Season: 2023–24
- Dates: 20 October 2023 – 25 May 2024
- Champions: Central Coast Mariners (3rd title)
- Premiers: Central Coast Mariners (3rd title)
- AFC Champions League Elite: Central Coast Mariners
- AFC Champions League Two: Sydney FC
- Matches: 169
- Goals: 556 (3.29 per match)
- Top goalscorer: Adam Taggart (20 goals)
- Best goalkeeper: Alex Paulsen
- Biggest home win: Melbourne City 8–0 Perth Glory (14 April 2024)
- Biggest away win: Adelaide United 1–5 Sydney FC (11 November 2023)
- Highest scoring: Melbourne City 8–1 Brisbane Roar (28 December 2023)
- Longest winning run: 5 games Central Coast Mariners
- Longest unbeaten run: 15 games Melbourne Victory
- Longest winless run: 10 games Perth Glory
- Longest losing run: 6 games Western United
- Highest attendance: 33,297; Wellington Phoenix 1–2 Melbourne Victory (18 May 2024)
- Lowest attendance: 2,410; Western United 0–1 Newcastle Jets (11 November 2023)
- Total attendance: 1,446,299
- Average attendance: 8,558 ( 566)
- All statistics correct as of 26 May 2024.

The 2023–24 A-League Men, known as the Isuzu UTE A-League for sponsorship reasons, was the 47th season of national level men's soccer in Australia, and the 19th since the establishment of the competition as the A-League in 2004. This season was the last as a 12-team competition, with expansion to 13 teams from 2024–25 with the inclusion of Auckland FC.

Central Coast Mariners were the premiers and champions this season.

== Clubs ==
=== Stadiums and locations ===
Twelve clubs are participating in the 2023–24 season.

Note: Table lists in alphabetical order.

Club	City	Home ground	Capacity
Adelaide United	Adelaide	Coopers Stadium	16,500
Brisbane Roar	Brisbane	Suncorp Stadium	52,500
Brisbane Roar	Brisbane	Ballymore Stadium	6,000
Central Coast Mariners	Gosford	Industree Group Stadium	20,059
Macarthur FC	Campbelltown	Campbelltown Sports Stadium	17,500
Melbourne City	Melbourne	AAMI Park	30,050
Melbourne Victory	Melbourne	AAMI Park	30,050
Newcastle Jets	Newcastle	McDonald Jones Stadium	30,000
Perth Glory	Perth	HBF Park	20,500
Sydney FC	Sydney	Allianz Stadium	42,500
Wellington Phoenix	Wellington	Sky Stadium	35,000
Wellington Phoenix	Auckland	Go Media Mount Smart Stadium	30,000
Wellington Phoenix	Auckland	Eden Park	50,000
Western Sydney Wanderers	Parramatta	CommBank Stadium	30,000
Western United	Melbourne	AAMI Park	30,050
Western United	Ballarat	Mars Stadium	11,000
Western United	Hobart	North Hobart Oval	10,000
Western United	Tarneit	Wyndham Regional Football Facility	5,000

=== Personnel and kits ===
Team	Manager	Captain	Kit manufacturer	Kit sponsor
Adelaide United	(Australia) Carl Veart	(Australia) Ryan Kitto	UCAN	Flinders University; Australian Outdoor Living (Note: Away kit)
Brisbane Roar	(Australia) Ruben Zadkovich	(Scotland) Tom Aldred	New Balance	OutKast
Central Coast Mariners	(England) Mark Jackson	(Australia) Danny Vukovic	Cikers	MATE
Macarthur FC	(Australia) Mile Sterjovski	(Mexico) Ulises Dávila	Kelme	Pennytel
Melbourne City	(Australia) Aurelio Vidmar (caretaker)	(Australia) Jamie Maclaren	Puma	Etihad Airways
Melbourne Victory	(Australia) Tony Popovic	(Portugal) Roderick Miranda	Macron	Bonza; AIA (finals series)^{1}
Newcastle Jets	(Australia) Robert Stanton	(Australia) Brandon O'Neill	Legend Sportswear	Port of Newcastle; Ampcontrol
Perth Glory	(Australia) Alen Stajcic	(England) Mark Beevers (Australia) Adam Taggart	Macron	Vacant; La Vida Homes (from round 21 onwards)
Sydney FC	(Australia) Ufuk Talay	(Australia) Luke Brattan	Under Armour	Macquarie University
Wellington Phoenix	(Australia) Giancarlo Italiano	(New Zealand) Alex Rufer	Paladin Sports	Oppo; Spark
Western Sydney Wanderers	(Australia) Marko Rudan	(Brazil) Marcelo	Adidas	Voltaren; Turner Freeman Lawyers
Western United	(Australia) John Aloisi	(Australia) Josh Risdon	Kappa	Sharp

1. Melbourne Victory's shirt sponsor was changed to AIA for the finals series after Bonza entered voluntary administration on 30 April 2024.

=== Managerial changes ===
Team	Outgoing manager	Manner of departure	Date of vacancy	Position on table	Incoming manager	Date of appointment
Brisbane Roar	(England) Nick Green (caretaker)	End of contract	2 May 2023	Pre-season	(Australia) Ross Aloisi	2 May 2023
Wellington Phoenix	(Australia) Ufuk Talay	End of contract	6 May 2023	Pre-season	(Australia) Giancarlo Italiano	6 May 2023
Perth Glory	(Australia) Ruben Zadkovich	Resigned	2 June 2023	Pre-season	(England) Kenny Lowe (caretaker)	12 July 2023
Newcastle Jets	(Australia) Arthur Papas	Resigned	19 June 2023	Pre-season	(Australia) Robert Stanton	26 June 2023
Perth Glory	(England) Kenny Lowe (caretaker)	End of contract	3 August 2023	Pre-season	(Australia) Alen Stajcic	3 August 2023
Central Coast Mariners	(Scotland) Nick Montgomery	Signed by (Scotland) Hibernian	11 September 2023	Pre-season	(Australia) Abbas Saad (caretaker)	11 September 2023
Central Coast Mariners	(Australia) Abbas Saad (caretaker)	End of caretaker spell	27 September 2023	Pre-season	(England) Mark Jackson	27 September 2023
Melbourne City	(Croatia) Rado Vidošić	Mutual termination	1 November 2023	12th	(Australia) Aurelio Vidmar (caretaker)	1 November 2023
Sydney FC	(Australia) Steve Corica	Mutual termination	7 November 2023	12th	(Australia) Ufuk Talay	8 November 2023
Brisbane Roar	(Australia) Ross Aloisi	Signed by (China) Shanghai Port as assistant coach	24 December 2023	5th	(Australia) Luciano Trani (caretaker)	24 December 2023
Brisbane Roar	(Australia) Luciano Trani (caretaker)	End of caretaker spell	1 January 2024	7th	(England) Ben Cahn	1 January 2024
Brisbane Roar	(England) Ben Cahn	Indefinite leave	1 February 2024	9th	(Australia) Ruben Zadkovich (caretaker)	1 February 2024
Brisbane Roar	(Australia) Ruben Zadkovich (caretaker)	Promoted to full-time	N/A	8th	(Australia) Ruben Zadkovich	22 April 2024

=== Foreign players ===
Club	Visa 1	Visa 2	Visa 3	Visa 4	Visa 5	Non-visa foreigner(s)	Former player(s)
Adelaide United	(England) Zach Clough	(England) Ryan Tunnicliffe	(Japan) Hiroshi Ibusuki	(Spain) Javi López		(Lebanon) Austin Ayoubi^{2} (Spain) Isaías^{1}	
Brisbane Roar	(France) Florin Berenguer	(Republic of Ireland) Jay O'Shea	(New Zealand) Marco Rojas			(Scotland) Tom Aldred^{1} (South Sudan) Ayom Majok^{2} (Sri Lanka) Jack Hingert^{2}	
Central Coast Mariners	(Brazil) Ronald Barcellos	(Brazil) Mikael Doka	(Colombia) Ángel Torres	(England) Ryan Edmondson	(Vanuatu) Brian Kaltak	(Kenya) William Wilson^{2} (Fiji) Dan Hall^{2} (New Zealand) Storm Roux^{2}	(Brazil) Marco Túlio
Macarthur FC	(France) Valère Germain	(Mexico) Ulises Dávila	(New Zealand) Clayton Lewis	(New Zealand) Tommy Smith	(Poland) Filip Kurto	(Tanzania) Charles M'Mombwa^{2}	
Melbourne City	(Brazil) Léo Natel	(Chile) Vicente Fernández	(France) Samuel Souprayen	(Germany) Tolgay Arslan	(Portugal) Nuno Reis	(Croatia) Marin Jakoliš^{2} (England) Jamie Young^{2}	(Morocco) Hamza Sakhi
Melbourne Victory	(Curaçao) Roly Bonevacia	(France) Damien Da Silva	(France) Zinédine Machach	(Portugal) Roderick Miranda	(Tunisia) Salim Khelifi	(Ivory Coast) Adama Traoré^{1} (North Macedonia) Matthew Bozinovski^{2}	(Spain) Rai Marchán
Newcastle Jets	(England) Carl Jenkinson	(France) Jason Berthomier				(New Zealand) Lachlan Bayliss^{2} (New Zealand) Dane Ingham^{2}	
Perth Glory	(Curaçao) Darryl Lachman	(England) Mark Beevers				(Cyprus) Antonis Martis^{2} (New Zealand) Oliver Sail^{2} (North Macedonia) Stefan Colakovski^{2}	(Republic of Ireland) Aaron McEneff (Tunisia) Salim Khelifi
Sydney FC	(Brazil) Fábio Gomes	(Brazil) Gabriel Lacerda	(England) Joe Lolley	(England) Jack Rodwell	(Slovakia) Róbert Mak		
Wellington Phoenix	(Bulgaria) Bozhidar Kraev	(Costa Rica) Youstin Salas	(England) David Ball	(England) Scott Wootton	(Poland) Oskar Zawada	(Iraq) Mohamed Al-Taay^{2}	
Western Sydney Wanderers	(Brazil) Marcelo	(Germany) Sonny Kittel	(Netherlands) Jorrit Hendrix	(Sweden) Marcus Antonsson		(Malta) Dylan Scicluna^{2} (Serbia) Miloš Ninković^{1} (South Sudan) Valentino Yuel^{2}	
Western United	(Brazil) Daniel Penha	(Japan) Riku Danzaki	(Japan) Tomoki Imai				

The following do not fill a Visa position:
^{1}Those players who were born and started their professional career abroad but have since gained Australian citizenship (or New Zealand citizenship, in the case of Wellington Phoenix);
^{2}Australian citizens (or New Zealand citizens, in the case of Wellington Phoenix) who have chosen to represent another national team;
^{3}Injury replacement players, or National team replacement players;
^{4}Guest players (eligible to play a maximum of fourteen games)

== Regular season ==
The 2023–24 season saw each team play 27 games followed by a finals series for the top six teams.

=== League table ===
Pos	Team	Pld	W	D	L	GF	GA	GD	Pts	Qualification
1	Central Coast Mariners (C)	27	17	4	6	49	27	+22	55	Qualification for AFC Champions League Elite and Finals series
2	Wellington Phoenix (Note: Wellington Phoenix cannot qualify for Asian Football Confederation competitions as they are based in New Zealand, which is part of the Oceania Football Confederation.)	27	15	8	4	42	26	+16	53	Qualification for Finals series (Note: The top two teams enter the finals series at the semi-finals, while the teams ranked third to sixth enter the finals series at the elimination-finals.)
3	Melbourne Victory	27	10	12	5	43	33	+10	42	Qualification for Finals series
4	Sydney FC	27	12	5	10	52	41	+11	41	Qualification for AFC Champions League Two and Finals series (Note: Qualified for AFC Champions League Two as the 2023 Australia Cup winners.)
5	Macarthur FC	27	11	8	8	45	48	−3	41	Qualification for Finals series
6	Melbourne City	27	11	6	10	50	38	+12	39	Qualification for Finals series
7	Western Sydney Wanderers	27	11	4	12	44	48	−4	37	
8	Adelaide United	27	9	5	13	52	53	−1	32	
9	Brisbane Roar	27	8	6	13	42	55	−13	30	Qualification for 2024 Australia Cup play-offs
10	Newcastle Jets	27	6	10	11	39	47	−8	28	Qualification for 2024 Australia Cup play-offs
11	Western United	27	7	5	15	36	55	−19	26	Qualification for 2024 Australia Cup play-offs
12	Perth Glory	27	5	7	15	46	69	−23	22	Qualification for 2024 Australia Cup play-offs

Source: A-Leagues
Rules for classification: 1) points; 2) wins; 3) goal difference; 4) goals scored; 5) head-to-head results; 5a) head-to-head points; 5b) head-to-head goal difference; 6) Fair Play points; 7) away goal difference; 8) away goals per match; 9) home goal difference; 10) home goals per match; 11) toss of a coin in an event of a tie of two clubs.
(C) Champions

=== Fixtures and results ===
Home \ Away	ADL	BRI	CCM	MAC	MCY	MVC	NEW	PER	SYD	WEL	WSW	WUN	ADL	BRI	CCM	MAC	MCY	MVC	NEW	PER	SYD	WEL	WSW	WUN
Adelaide United		0–2	3–0	1–1	6–0	1–2	3–1	3–3	1–5	2–2	1–2	4–1			0–4	1–2					4–3			
Brisbane Roar	3–4		0–3	1–3	5–1	3–2	0–2	2–1	3–0	1–1	2–2	2–2				1–2			3–2		1–2			
Central Coast Mariners	2–0	1–2		1–2	2–1	2–2	3–1	4–2	1–3	2–1	1–0	4–0		2–0			2–1	1–1						
Macarthur FC	4–3	1–1	0–3		2–0	1–1	1–1	2–2	1–0	0–3	4–3	1–0										1–2	1–3	3–3
Melbourne City	1–0	8–1	3–3	3–3		0–0	0–0	8–0	2–0	1–0	7–0	1–2						0–0						1–0
Melbourne Victory	1–1	0–0	0–1	0–1	2–1		5–3	2–1	3–0	1–1	3–4	2–1	2–0								1–1			
Newcastle Jets	0–1	3–1	0–1	2–2	0–2	1–1		2–2	3–1	1–2	2–2	2–0			1–3							1–1		
Perth Glory	2–4	3–2	2–0	3–2	1–2	2–3	2–2		1–1	0–0	1–2	3–4					4–2		2–2			3–4		
Sydney FC	2–1	1–1	2–0	0–2	1–1	0–2	4–0	3–2		3–1	0–1	4–2								7–1			2–1	
Wellington Phoenix	3–2	5–2	0–0	3–0	1–0	1–1	0–3	2–1	2–1		2–0	2–0		1–0				1–0						
Western Sydney Wanderers	1–0	1–2	0–1	3–1	1–0	3–4	3–3	2–0	1–4	0–0		5–0					1–2			1–2				1–3
Western United	1–3	2–1	0–2	4–2	1–2	2–2	0–1	1–0	2–2	0–1	0–1		3–3						2–0					

Source: Aleagues.com.au
Legend: Blue = home team win; Yellow = draw; Red = away team win.

== Finals series ==
The finals series was held in mostly the same format as the previous year, run over four weeks, involving the top six teams from the regular season. In the first week of fixtures, the third-through-sixth ranked teams will each play an elimination match, with the two winners of those matches joining the first and second ranked teams in two-legged semi-final ties. The two winners of those matches will meet in the Grand Final. The previous format, which saw Sydney hosting the Grand Final until the 2024–25 season, was overturned in October 2023, reverting to the higher-ranked semi-final winner hosting the match.

=== Bracket ===
Elimination-finals
4	Sydney FC	4
5	Macarthur FC	0
3	Melbourne Victory (p)	1 (3)
6	Melbourne City	1 (2)

Semi-finals
4	Sydney FC	1	0	1
1	Central Coast Mariners	2	0	2
3	Melbourne Victory (a.e.t.)	0	2	2
2	Wellington Phoenix	0	1	1

Grand final
1	Central Coast Mariners (a.e.t.)	3
3	Melbourne Victory	1

=== Elimination-finals ===
4 May 2024
19:45 AEST (UTC+10:00)

Sydney FC	4–0	Macarthur FC
Mak 8', 78'; Lolley 50'; Kucharski 67'	Report

Allianz Stadium, Sydney
Attendance: 11,792
Referee: Alireza Faghani

5 May 2024
17:00 AEST (UTC+10:00)

Melbourne Victory	1–1 (a.e.t.)	Melbourne City
Velupillay 88'	Report	Souprayen 29'
Penalties
Miranda (penalty scored); Da Silva (penalty scored); Izzo (penalty scored); Broxham (penalty missed)	3–2	(penalty scored) Natel; (penalty missed) Antonis; (penalty missed) Talbot; (penalty scored) Caputo; (penalty missed) Jeggo

AAMI Park, Melbourne
Attendance: 21,358
Referee: Alex King

=== Semi-finals ===
==== Summary ====
Team 1	Agg.	Team 2	1st leg	2nd leg
Central Coast Mariners	2–1	Sydney FC	2–1	0–0
Wellington Phoenix	1–2	Melbourne Victory	0–0	1–2 (a.e.t.)

==== Matches ====
10 May 2024
19:45 AEST (UTC+10:00)

Sydney FC	1–2	Central Coast Mariners
King 25'	Report	Nisbet 45+3'; Doka 56' (pen.)

Allianz Stadium, Sydney
Attendance: 13,813
Referee: Ben Abraham
18 May 2024
19:45 AEST (UTC+10:00)

Central Coast Mariners	0–0	Sydney FC
	Report

Industree Group Stadium, Gosford
Attendance: 20,059
Referee: Alireza Faghani

Central Coast Mariners won 2–1 on aggregate.

12 May 2024
16:00 AEST (UTC+10:00)

Melbourne Victory	0–0	Wellington Phoenix
	Report

AAMI Park, Melbourne
Attendance: 16,313
Referee: Adam Kersey
18 May 2024
18:30 NZST (UTC+12:00)

Wellington Phoenix	1–2 (a.e.t.)	Melbourne Victory
Zawada 90+9'	Report	Traoré 82'; Ikonomidis 102'

Sky Stadium, Wellington
Attendance: 33,297
Referee: Daniel Elder

Melbourne Victory won 2–1 on aggregate.

=== Grand Final ===
25 May 2024
19:45 AEST (UTC+10:00)

Central Coast Mariners	3–1 (a.e.t.)	Melbourne Victory
Edmondson 90+1', 120+1'; Di Pizio 97'	Report	Geria 50'

Central Coast Stadium, Gosford
Attendance: 21,379
Referee: Alex King

== Regular season statistics ==
=== Top scorers ===
As of 1 May 2024.

Rank	Player	Club	Goals
1	(Australia) Adam Taggart	Perth Glory	20
2	(Australia) Bruno Fornaroli	Melbourne Victory	18
3	(Australia) Apostolos Stamatelopoulos	Newcastle Jets	17
4	(Japan) Hiroshi Ibusuki	Adelaide United	15
5	(Germany) Tolgay Arslan	Melbourne City	13
5	(New Zealand) Kosta Barbarouses	Wellington Phoenix	13
5	(Colombia) Ángel Torres	Central Coast Mariners	13
8	(France) Valère Germain	Macarthur FC	12
9	(Brazil) Fábio Gomes	Sydney FC	11
9	(England) Joe Lolley	Sydney FC	11

=== Hat-tricks ===
Player	For	Against	Result	Date	Ref.
(Australia) Bruno Fornaroli^{4}	Melbourne Victory	Newcastle Jets	5–3 (H)	29 October 2023	
(Poland) Oskar Zawada	Wellington Phoenix	Brisbane Roar	5–2 (H)	4 November 2023	
(Australia) Bruno Fornaroli^{4}	Melbourne Victory	Western Sydney Wanderers	3–4 (A)	10 December 2023	
(Colombia) Ángel Torres	Central Coast Mariners	Melbourne City	3–3 (A)	17 December 2023	
(Australia) Jamie Maclaren	Melbourne City	Brisbane Roar	8–1 (H)	28 December 2023	
(Mexico) Ulises Dávila	Macarthur FC	Western United	3–3 (N)	12 January 2024	
(Japan) Hiroshi Ibusuki	Adelaide United	Sydney FC	4–3 (N)	13 January 2024	
(France) Valère Germain	Macarthur FC	Western Sydney Wanderers	4–3 (H)	4 February 2024	
(Australia) Nestory Irankunda	Adelaide United	Western United	4–1 (H)	29 March 2024	
(Germany) Tolgay Arslan	Melbourne City	Perth Glory	8–0 (H)	14 April 2024	

Key
^{4}	Player scored four goals
(H)	Home team
(A)	Away team
(N)	Neutral ground

=== Clean sheets ===
As of 1 May 2024

Rank	Goalkeeper	Club	Clean sheets
1	(Australia) Danny Vukovic	Central Coast Mariners	12
2	(New Zealand) Alex Paulsen	Wellington Phoenix	11
3	(England) Jamie Young	Melbourne City	10
4	(Australia) Paul Izzo	Melbourne Victory	6
5	(Poland) Filip Kurto	Macarthur FC	5
5	(Australia) Ryan Scott	Newcastle Jets	5
5	(Australia) Lawrence Thomas	Western Sydney Wanderers	5
8	(Australia) Macklin Freke	Brisbane Roar	3
9	(Australia) Joe Gauci	Adelaide United	2
9	(Australia) Daniel Margush	Western Sydney Wanderers	2
9	(Australia) Andrew Redmayne	Sydney FC	2

== Awards ==
=== Annual awards ===
Award	Winner	Club	Ref.
Johnny Warren Medal	(Australia) Josh Nisbet	Central Coast Mariners	
Young Footballer of the Year	(Australia) Nestory Irankunda (New Zealand) Alex Paulsen	Adelaide United; Wellington Phoenix	
Golden Boot Award	(Australia) Adam Taggart	Perth Glory	
Goalkeeper of the Year	(New Zealand) Alex Paulsen	Wellington Phoenix	
Goal of the Year	(Australia) Bruno Fornaroli	Melbourne Victory	
Save of the Year	(Australia) Danny Vukovic	Central Coast Mariners	
Playmaker of the Year	(Australia) Anthony Caceres	Sydney FC	
Fan Player of the Year	(New Zealand) Alex Paulsen	Wellington Phoenix	
Coach of the Year	(England) Mark Jackson	Central Coast Mariners	
Fair Play Award	Newcastle Jets		
Referee of the Year	(Australia) Alex King	—N/a	

=== Club awards ===
Club	Player of the Season	Ref.
Adelaide United	(England) Zach Clough	
Brisbane Roar	(Australia) Macklin Freke	
Central Coast Mariners	(Australia) Max Balard	
Macarthur FC	(Australia) Jake Hollman	
Melbourne City	(Germany) Tolgay Arslan	
Melbourne Victory	(France) Damien Da Silva	
Newcastle Jets	(Australia) Apostolos Stamatelopoulos	
Perth Glory	(Australia) Adam Taggart	
Sydney FC	(England) Joe Lolley	
Wellington Phoenix	(New Zealand) Kosta Barbarouses	
Western Sydney Wanderers	(Brazil) Marcelo	
Western United	(Brazil) Daniel Penha	

=== Team of the season ===
Goalkeeper	Defenders	Midfielders	Forwards	Substitutes
(New Zealand) Alex Paulsen (Wellington Phoenix)	(New Zealand) Tim Payne (Wellington Phoenix) (England) Scott Wootton (Wellington Phoenix) (Vanuatu) Brian Kaltak (Central Coast Mariners) (Australia) Jacob Farrell (Central Coast Mariners)	(Australia) Josh Nisbet (Central Coast Mariners) (New Zealand) Alex Rufer (Wellington Phoenix) (Germany) Tolgay Arslan (Melbourne City)	(England) Joe Lolley (Sydney FC) (Australia) Adam Taggart (Perth Glory) (Australia) Bruno Fornaroli (Melbourne Victory)	(Australia) Danny Vukovic (Central Coast Mariners) (France) Damien Da Silva (Melbourne Victory) (Brazil) Marcelo (Western Sydney Wanderers) (Australia) Jake Girdwood-Reich (Sydney FC) (Australia) Anthony Caceres (Sydney FC) (New Zealand) Kosta Barbarouses (Wellington Phoenix) (Australia) Apostolos Stamatelopoulos (Newcastle Jets)

== Attendances ==
Sydney FC drew the highest average home attendance in the 2023-24 edition of the A-League.

#	Football club	Home games	Average attendance
1	Sydney FC	13	14,476
2	Melbourne Victory	13	12,227
3	Western Sydney Wanderers	13	10,573
4	Adelaide United	13	10,035
5	Wellington Phoenix	13	8,940
6	Melbourne City FC	13	8,488
7	Central Coast Mariners	13	7,250
8	Brisbane Roar	13	6,707
9	Perth Glory	13	5,964
10	Newcastle United Jets	13	5,673
11	Macarthur FC	13	4,216
12	Western United	13	3,274

== See also ==
- 2023–24 A-League Women
- 2023–24 Adelaide United FC season
- 2023–24 Brisbane Roar FC season
- 2023–24 Central Coast Mariners FC season
- 2023–24 Macarthur FC season
- 2023–24 Melbourne City FC season
- 2023–24 Melbourne Victory FC season
- 2023–24 Newcastle Jets FC season
- 2023–24 Perth Glory FC season
- 2023–24 Sydney FC season
- 2023–24 Wellington Phoenix FC season
- 2023–24 Western Sydney Wanderers FC season
- 2023–24 Western United FC season
