= 2025–26 Wellington Phoenix FC season =

Wellington Phoenix
2025–26 season
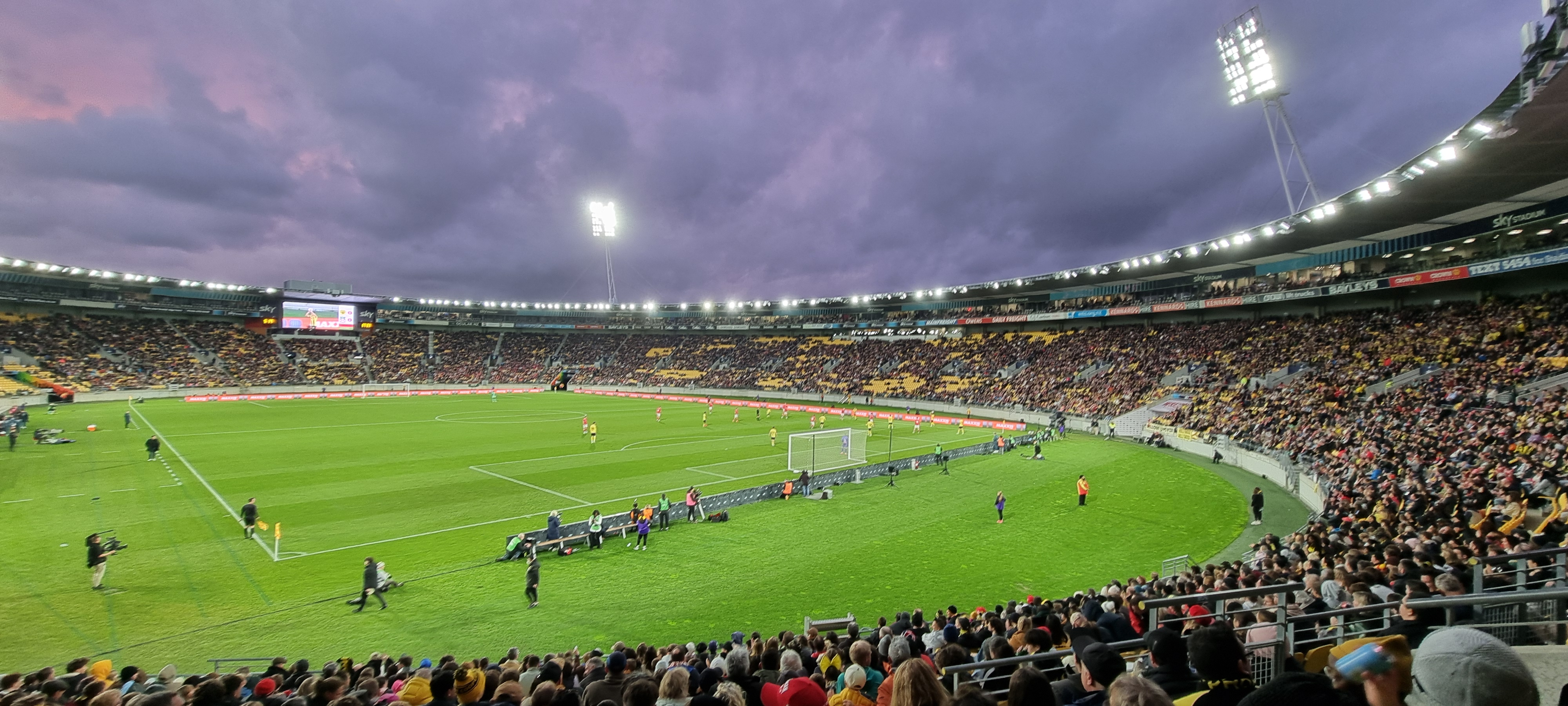
- Preseason match between Wellington Phoenix and Wrexham on 19 July 2025.
- Chairman: Rob Morrison
- Manager: Giancarlo Italiano (to 21 February 2026); Chris Greenacre (from 23 February 2026)
- Stadium: Wellington Regional Stadium (Note: Known as Sky Stadium from 2020 until 28 February 2026 and as Hnry Stadium from 1 March 2026 onwards.)
- A-League Men: 8th
- A-League Men finals series: DNQ
- Australia Cup: Quarter-final
- Top goalscorer: League: Ifeanyi Eze (10 goals); All: Ifeanyi Eze (10 goals)
- Highest home attendance: 12,091 vs. Auckland FC (8 November 2025); A-League Men
- Lowest home attendance: 3,030 vs. Newcastle Jets (14 December 2025); A-League Men
- Average home league attendance: 5,697
- Biggest win: 3–0 vs. Brisbane Roar (A) (3 January 2026); A-League Men
- Biggest defeat: 0–5 vs. Auckland FC (H) (21 February 2026); A-League Men
Home colours	Away colours	Third colours
- All statistics correct as of end of season.

The 2025–26 season was Wellington Phoenix Football Club's 19th season in the A-League Men. In addition to the domestic league, the club participated in this season's edition of the Australia Cup.

In the Australia Cup, the Phoenix progressed to the quarter-finals after defeating Perth Glory in a penalty shootout and NPL Victoria 3 team Nunawading City 1–0. Ultimately, the club succumbed to NPL Victoria side Heidelberg United on 19 August 2025. This was the last time the club participated in the Australia Cup, as New Zealand-based teams were omitted from the 2026 edition onwards.

The Phoenix commenced their A-League Men campaign on 18 October 2025 away to Perth Glory. The regular season concluded on 24 April 2026, with the team ending in 8th position on the table and without making the playoffs.

In January 2026, it was announced that the naming rights for Wellington Regional Stadium, known as Sky Stadium from 2020–2026, would be renamed Hnry Stadium effective 1 March 2026.

On 21 February, the Phoenix played their third New Zealand derby of the season against Auckland FC, having lost the previous two encounters, they went on to lose 5–0, the highest home defeat of the season. Head coach Giancarlo Italiano resigned minutes after the final whistle during his post-match press, ending his seven-year association with the club. On 23 February, Chris Greenacre was announced as the interim head coach for the remainder of the season. Following a successful interim spell, Greenacre was appointed to the position of head coach for the 2026–27 season.

== Players ==
Note: Flags indicate national team as defined under FIFA eligibility rules; some limited exceptions apply. Players may hold more than one non-FIFA nationality.

No.	Pos.	Nation	Player
1	GK	ENG	Josh Oluwayemi
3	DF	NZL	Corban Piper
4	DF	CAN	Manjrekar James
5	MF	NZL	Fin Roa Conchie
6	DF	NZL	Tim Payne
7	FW	NGA	Ifeanyi Eze
8	MF	AUS	Paulo Retre
9	MF	NZL	Sarpreet Singh (on loan from TSC)
10	FW	AUS	Nikola Mileusnic
11	FW	AUS	Carlo Armiento
12	DF	NZL	Daniel Edwards
14	MF	NZL	Alex Rufer (captain)
15	DF	NZL	Isaac Hughes
16	MF	NOR	Sander Kartum (on loan from Heart of Midlothian)

No.	Pos.	Nation	Player
17	FW	NZL	Gabriel Sloane-Rodrigues (scholarship)
18	DF	NZL	Lukas Kelly-Heald
19	FW	NZL	Nathan Walker (scholarship)
20	MF	LBN	Ramy Najjarine
23	FW	NZL	Luke Supyk
24	DF	NZL	Xuan Loke (scholarship)
25	MF	JPN	Kazuki Nagasawa
27	DF	NZL	Matthew Sheridan
28	DF	NZL	Bill Tuiloma
29	FW	NZL	Luke Brooke-Smith (scholarship)
30	GK	NZL	Alby Kelly-Heald
37	MF	NZL	Anaru Cassidy (scholarship)
39	DF	NZL	Jayden Smith (scholarship)

=== Other players with first-team appearances ===
Note: Flags indicate national team as defined under FIFA eligibility rules; some limited exceptions apply. Players may hold more than one non-FIFA nationality.

No.	Pos.	Nation	Player
31	DF	NZL	Ryan Lee
40	GK	NZL	Eamonn McCarron

No.	Pos.	Nation	Player
46	MF	NZL	Lachlan Candy

== Transfers ==
=== Transfers in ===
No.	Pos.	Player	Transferred from	Type/fee	Contract length	Date	Ref.
7	FW	(Nigeria) Ifeanyi Eze	(Iraq) Al-Karkh	Free transfer	1 year	15 July 2025	
11	FW	(Australia) Carlo Armiento	Unattached	Free transfer	1 year	22 July 2025	
10	FW	(Australia) Nikola Mileusnic	Perth Glory	Free transfer	1 year	13 August 2025	
4	DF	(Canada) Manjrekar James	Unattached	Free transfer	1 year	21 August 2025	
12	DF	Daniel Edwards	(Australia) Avondale FC	Free transfer	1 year	15 September 2025	
20	MF	(Lebanon) Ramy Najjarine	Unattached	Free transfer	1 year	15 September 2025	
28	DF	Bill Tuiloma	Unattached	Free transfer	2.5 years	14 January 2026	
16	MF	(Norway) Sander Kartum	(Scotland) Heart of Midlothian	Loan	6 months	16 January 2026	
9	MF	Sarpreet Singh	(Serbia) TSC	Loan	5 months	6 February 2026	

==== From youth squad ====
N	Pos.	Nat.	Name	Age	Notes
37	MF	(New Zealand)	Anaru Cassidy	19	2-year scholarship contract

=== Transfers out ===
No.	Pos.	Player	Transferred to	Type/fee	Date	Ref.
4	DF	(England) Scott Wootton	Perth Glory	End of contract	30 June 2025	
19	DF	Sam Sutton	Perth Glory	End of contract	30 June 2025	
7	FW	Kosta Barbarouses	Western Sydney Wanderers	End of contract	30 June 2025	
11	FW	(North Macedonia) Stefan Colakovski	Unattached	End of contract	30 June 2025	
12	MF	(Portugal) Francisco Geraldes	(Malaysia) Johor Darul Ta'zim	End of loan	30 June 2025	
35	GK	Dublin Boon	Unattached	End of contract	30 June 2025	
9	FW	(Japan) Hideki Ishige	Unattached	Mutual contract termination	16 January 2026	

=== Contract extensions ===
No.	Player / coach	Position	Duration	Date	Notes	Ref.
—	(England) Chris Greenacre	Head coach	1 year (Note: Option for an additional year.)	28 April 2026	Contract upgraded from interim to fulltime head coach.	

== Pre-season and friendlies ==
The Phoenix began their preseason in July 2025, with Wrexham AFC, a Welsh club in the EFL Championship, touring three A-League Men clubs as part of their preseason Wrexham Down Under tour. On 20 September, the club hosted an open day including a fixture against Central League champions Wellington Olympic. On 24 September, the Phoenix confirmed their final three preseason matches in New South Wales against A-League Men opponents Sydney FC, Western Sydney Wanderers, and Central Coast Mariners.

19 July 2025	Wellington Phoenix (New Zealand)	1–0	(Wales) Wrexham	Wellington, New Zealand
17:00 NZST	Flowerdew 49'	Report		Stadium: Sky Stadium; Attendance: 25,399

20 September 2025	Wellington Phoenix (New Zealand)	6–1	(New Zealand) Wellington Olympic	Upper Hutt, New Zealand
13:00 NZST	Najjarine; Armiento; Eze; (o.g.); (o.g.)	Report	Prins (pen.)	Stadium: NZCIS

26 September 2025	Sydney FC (Australia)	1–0	(New Zealand) Wellington Phoenix	Sydney, Australia
	Macallister	Report		Stadium: Leichhardt Oval

4 October 2025	Western Sydney Wanderers (Australia)	1–1	(New Zealand) Wellington Phoenix	Australia
	Goal	Report	Hughes

12 October 2025	Central Coast Mariners (Australia)	0–3	(New Zealand) Wellington Phoenix	Gosford, Australia
		Report	Rufer; Eze	Stadium: polytec Stadium

== Competitions ==
=== Overall record ===
Competition	First match	Last match	Starting round	Final position	Record							
Competition	First match	Last match	Starting round	Final position	Pld	W	D	L	GF	GA	GD	Win %
A-League Men	18 October 2025	24 April 2026	Matchday 1	8th	26	9	6	11	36	48	−12	34.62
Australia Cup	27 July 2025	19 August 2025	Round of 32	Quarter-final	3	1	1	1	2	5	−3	33.33
Total					29	10	7	12	38	53	−15	34.48

Last updated: end of season.
Source: Competitions

=== A-League Men ===
==== League table ====
Pos	Team	Pld	W	D	L	GF	GA	GD	Pts	Qualification
6	Melbourne City	26	10	8	8	33	33	0	38	Qualification for the finals series (Note: The top two teams enter the finals series at the semi-finals, while the teams ranked third to sixth enter the finals series at the elimination-finals.)
7	Macarthur FC	26	9	7	10	37	44	−7	34	
8	Wellington Phoenix (Note: Auckland FC and Wellington Phoenix cannot qualify for Asian Football Confederation competitions as they are based in New Zealand, which is part of the Oceania Football Confederation.)	26	9	6	11	36	48	−12	33	
9	Central Coast Mariners	26	8	8	10	35	42	−7	32	
10	Perth Glory	26	8	7	11	32	39	−7	31	

Source: A-Leagues
Rules for classification: 1) points; 2) goal difference; 3) goals scored; 4) wins; 5) head-to-head results; 5a) head-to-head points; 5b) head-to-head goal difference; 6) Fair Play points; 7) away goal difference; 8) away goals per match; 9) home goal difference; 10) home goals per match; 11) toss of a coin in an event of a tie of two clubs.

==== Results summary ====
As of end of season.

Overall								Home						Away					
Pld	W	D	L	GF	GA	GD	Pts	W	D	L	GF	GA	GD	W	D	L	GF	GA	GD
26	9	6	11	36	48	−12	33	5	2	6	19	23	−4	4	4	5	17	25	−8

==== Results by round ====
Round	1	2	3	4	5	6	7	8	9	10	11	12	13	14	15	16	17	18	19	20	21	22	23	24	25	26
Ground	A	H	A	H	H	H	A	H	H	A	A	H	A	A	H	H	A	H	H	A	H	A	A	A	H	A
Result	D	W	D	L	L	W	L	L	W	L	W	D	W	L	D	L	D	L	L	D	W	W	W	L	W	L
Position	4	2	4	7	8	6	7	11	7	10	9	10	8	9	10	11	10	11	12	11	10	8	7	8	7	8
Points	1	4	5	5	5	8	8	8	11	11	14	15	18	18	19	19	20	20	20	21	24	27	30	30	33	33

Updated to match(es) played on end of season. Source: Ultimate A-League
A = Away; H = Home; W = Win; D = Draw; L = Loss

==== Matches ====
The A-League Men fixtures for the season were released on 11 September 2025. On 20 November 2025, the Phoenix confirmed their final home match of the season, set for 18 April 2026, will take place in Christchurch. This marks the second consecutive year the Wellington Phoenix play a match in the South Island city.

Win Draw Loss Fixtures

18 October 2025 1	Perth Glory	2–2	Wellington Phoenix	Perth
19:45 AWST	Taggart 16'; Kucharski 28'	Report	Eze 45+3'; Armiento 69'	Stadium: HBF Park; Attendance: 7,868; Referee: Ben Abraham

26 October 2025 2	Wellington Phoenix	2–1	Brisbane Roar	Wellington
15:00 NZDT	Nagasawa 76'; Armiento 90+6'	Report	Vidic 42'	Stadium: Sky Stadium; Attendance: 6,890; Referee: Daniel Elder

2 November 2025 3	Central Coast Mariners	1–1	Wellington Phoenix	Gosford
17:00 AEDT	Ngor 52'	Report	Eze 4'	Stadium: Polytec Stadium; Attendance: 4,813; Referee: Tim Danaskos

8 November 2025 4	Wellington Phoenix	1–2	Auckland FC	Wellington
19:00 NZDT	Eze 9'	Report	Cosgrove 1', 34'	Stadium: Sky Stadium; Attendance: 12,091; Referee: Ben Abraham

22 November 2025 5	Wellington Phoenix	0–1	Macarthur FC	Wellington
17:00 NZDT		Report	Sawyer 83'	Stadium: Sky Stadium; Attendance: 3,677; Referee: Jonathan Barreiro

29 November 2025 6	Wellington Phoenix	2–1	Adelaide United	Wellington
17:00 NZDT	Rufer 13'; Najjarine 52' (pen.)	Report	Garuccio 74'	Stadium: Sky Stadium; Attendance: 3,063; Referee: Daniel Elder

6 December 2025 7	Auckland FC	3–1	Wellington Phoenix	Auckland
17:00 NZDT	Brook 7'; de Vries 72'; May 80'	Report	Rufer 55'	Stadium: Go Media Stadium; Attendance: 21,997; Referee: Adam Kersey

14 December 2025 8	Wellington Phoenix	1–3	Newcastle Jets	Wellington
15:00 NZDT	Eze 69'	Report	Adams 50'; Rose 54'; Taylor 57'	Stadium: Sky Stadium; Attendance: 3,030; Referee: Alex King

21 December 2025 9	Wellington Phoenix	3–1	Central Coast Mariners	Wellington
15:00 NZDT	Piper 36'; James 49' (pen.); Armiento 52'	Report	Ngor 45+6'	Stadium: Sky Stadium; Attendance: 3,587; Referee: Tim Danaskos

29 December 2025 10	Melbourne Victory	5–1	Wellington Phoenix	Melbourne
19:00 AEDT	Vergos 7', 42', 47'; Santos 55'; Jelacic 90'	Report	Najjarine 29'	Stadium: AAMI Park; Attendance: 10,769; Referee: Shaun Evans

3 January 2026 11	Brisbane Roar	0–3	Wellington Phoenix	Kippa-Ring
16:00 AEST		Report	Eze 6'; Nagasawa 59'; Retre 90+1'	Stadium: Kayo Stadium; Attendance: 8,961; Referee: Ben Abraham

11 January 2026 12	Wellington Phoenix	2–2	Adelaide United	Wellington
15:00 NZDT	Hughes 56'; Piper 65'	Report	White 14'; Duzel 44'	Stadium: Sky Stadium; Attendance: 3,068; Referee: Lachlan Keevers

18 January 2026 13	Sydney FC	0–2	Wellington Phoenix	Sydney
17:00 AEDT		Report	Armiento 29'; Hughes 63'	Stadium: Allianz Stadium; Attendance: 13,678; Referee: Sam Kelly

23 January 2026 14	Newcastle Jets	4–1	Wellington Phoenix	Newcastle
19:35 AEDT	Bayliss 1'; Taylor 56'; Adams 70'; Bertoncello 89'	Report	Kartum 86'	Stadium: McDonald Jones Stadium; Attendance: 8,207; Referee: Declan Woods

30 January 2026 15	Wellington Phoenix	2–2	Melbourne City	Wellington
19:00 NZDT	Eze 23', 52'	Report	Younis 73'; Memeti 77'	Stadium: Sky Stadium; Attendance: 3,679; Referee: Alireza Faghani

6 February 2026 16	Wellington Phoenix	2–3	Melbourne Victory	Wellington
19:00 NZDT	Armiento 39'; Miranda 84' (o.g.)	Report	Esposito 10'; Velupillay 44'; D'Arrigo 77'	Stadium: Sky Stadium; Attendance: 5,783; Referee: Jack Morgan

13 February 2026 17	Western Sydney Wanderers	2–2	Wellington Phoenix	Sydney
19:35 AEDT	Fraser 17'; Cancar 43'	Report	Tuiloma 68'; Eze 71'	Stadium: CommBank Stadium; Attendance: 4,461; Referee: Adam Kersey

21 February 2026 18	Wellington Phoenix	0–5	Auckland FC	Wellington
17:00 NZDT		Report	Oluwayemi 24' (o.g.); Randall 30', 45+5'; May 41'; Brook 74'	Stadium: Sky Stadium; Attendance: 10,040; Referee: Lachlan Keevers

1 March 2026 19	Wellington Phoenix	0–1	Sydney FC	Wellington
15:00 NZDT		Report	Popovic 49'	Stadium: Hnry Stadium; Attendance: 4,322; Referee: Tim Danaskos

6 March 2026 20	Adelaide United	1–1	Wellington Phoenix	Adelaide
19:05 ACDT	Jovanovic 55'	Report	James 35'	Stadium: Coopers Stadium; Attendance: 9,111; Referee: Jonathan Barreiro

14 March 2026 21	Wellington Phoenix	2–0	Perth Glory	Wellington
15:00 NZDT	Piper 55'; Pennington 84' (o.g.)	Report		Stadium: Hnry Stadium; Attendance: 3,766; Referee: Nathan Shakespear

21 March 2026 22	Brisbane Roar	1–2	Wellington Phoenix	Brisbane
14:00 AEST	McGarry 14'	Report	Piper 36'; Eze 86'	Stadium: Suncorp Stadium; Attendance: 4,826; Referee: Alireza Faghani

5 April 2026 23	Melbourne Victory	0–1	Wellington Phoenix	Melbourne
17:00 AEST		Report	Kartum 89'	Stadium: AAMI Park; Attendance: 8,762; Referee: Nathan Shakespear

12 April 2026 24	Melbourne City	2–0	Wellington Phoenix	Melbourne
15:00 AEST	Behich 27'; Younis 76'	Report		Stadium: AAMI Park; Attendance: 4,896; Referee: Alex King

18 April 2026 25	Wellington Phoenix	2–1	Western Sydney Wanderers	Christchurch
17:00 NZST	Eze 16'; Nagasawa 56'	Report	Borrello 41'	Stadium: Apollo Projects Stadium; Attendance: 11,066; Referee: Benjamin Abraham

24 April 2026 26	Macarthur FC	4–0	Wellington Phoenix	Sydney
19:35 AEST	Jurman 6'; Bosnjak 22'; Brattan 34'; Bernardo 80'	Report		Stadium: Campbelltown Sports Stadium; Attendance: 6,013; Referee: Lachlan Keevers

=== Australia Cup ===
The round of 32 Australia Cup draw took place on 26 June 2025, with the Phoenix drawing A-League Men rivals Perth Glory. The draw for the round of 16 and subsequent rounds took place on 30 July 2025. This was the last time Wellington Phoenix participated in the Australia Cup, as New Zealand-based teams were omitted from the 2026 edition onwards.

27 July 2025 Round of 32	Perth Glory	1–1 (a.e.t.) (7–8 p)	Wellington Phoenix	Perth
15:00 AWST	Taggart 89'	Report	L. Kelly-Heald 20'	Stadium: Kingsway Reserve; Attendance: 1,141; Referee: Liam Barclay
	Penalties
	Taggart (penalty scored); Bugarija (penalty scored); Gomulka (penalty scored); Ngo (penalty scored); O'Neill (penalty missed); Majekodunmi (penalty scored); Sutton (penalty scored); Lebib (penalty scored); Kaltak (penalty missed)		(penalty missed) Nagasawa; (penalty scored) Supyk; (penalty scored) Ishige; (penalty scored) Retre; (penalty scored) Candy; (penalty scored) Hughes; (penalty scored) Gillion; (penalty scored) Smith; (penalty scored) L. Kelly-Heald

10 August 2025 Round of 16	Nunawading City	0–1	Wellington Phoenix	Melbourne
15:00 AEST		Report	Ishige 90+4'	Stadium: Nasiol Stadium; Attendance: 1,423; Referee: Eric Saba

19 August 2025 Quarter-finals	Heidelberg United	4–0	Wellington Phoenix	Melbourne
19:30 AEST	Hughes 35' (o.g.); Bisetto 47'; Yokokawa 51'; Dau 86'	Report		Stadium: Olympic Park; Attendance: 1,547; Referee: Lachlan Keevers

== Statistics ==
=== Appearances and goals ===
Includes all competitions. Players with no appearances not included in the list.

As of end of season.

No.	Pos.	Nat.	Player	A-League Men		Australia Cup		Total	
No.	Pos.	Nat.	Player	Apps	Goals	Apps	Goals	Apps	Goals
1	GK	(England)	Josh Oluwayemi	18	0	2	0	20	0
3	DF	(New Zealand)	Corban Piper	15+11	4	0	0	26	4
4	DF	(Canada)	Manjrekar James	16+4	2	0	0	20	2
5	MF	(New Zealand)	Fin Roa Conchie	7+7	0	3	0	17	0
6	DF	(New Zealand)	Tim Payne	13+1	0	2	0	16	0
7	FW	(Nigeria)	Ifeanyi Eze	25	10	0+2	0	27	10
8	MF	(Australia)	Paulo Retre	11+6	1	0+3	0	20	1
9	MF	(New Zealand)	Sarpreet Singh	1+1	0	0	0	2	0
10	FW	(Australia)	Nikola Mileusnic	0+7	0	0	0	7	0
11	FW	(Australia)	Carlo Armiento	19+3	5	0+2	0	24	5
12	DF	(New Zealand)	Daniel Edwards	6+3	0	0	0	9	0
14	MF	(New Zealand)	Alex Rufer	23	2	0+1	0	24	2
15	DF	(New Zealand)	Isaac Hughes	23	2	3	0	26	2
16	MF	(Norway)	Sander Kartum	3+9	2	0	0	12	2
17	FW	(New Zealand)	Gabriel Sloane-Rodrigues	0+3	0	3	0	6	0
18	DF	(New Zealand)	Lukas Kelly-Heald	13+10	0	3	1	26	1
20	FW	(Lebanon)	Ramy Najjarine	22+2	2	0	0	24	2
23	FW	(New Zealand)	Luke Supyk	0+1	0	1+2	0	4	0
24	DF	(New Zealand)	Xuan Loke	3+3	0	3	0	9	0
25	MF	(Japan)	Kazuki Nagasawa	26	3	3	0	29	3
27	DF	(New Zealand)	Matthew Sheridan	19+7	0	3	0	29	0
28	DF	(New Zealand)	Bill Tuiloma	12+2	1	0	0	14	1
29	FW	(New Zealand)	Luke Brooke-Smith	0+19	0	2+1	0	22	0
30	GK	(New Zealand)	Alby Kelly-Heald	3+1	0	0	0	4	0
31	DF	(New Zealand)	Ryan Lee	0+1	0	0	0	1	0
37	MF	(New Zealand)	Anaru Cassidy	0+2	0	0	0	2	0
39	DF	(New Zealand)	Jayden Smith	1	0	1	0	2	0
40	GK	(New Zealand)	Eamonn McCarron	5+1	0	1	0	7	0
46	MF	(New Zealand)	Lachlan Candy	0	0	0+1	0	1	0
Player(s) transferred out but featured this season
9	FW	(Japan)	Hideki Ishige	2+1	0	3	1	6	1
42	FW	(New Zealand)	Fergus Gillion	0	0	0+1	0	1	0

=== Disciplinary record ===
Includes all competitions. The list is sorted by squad number when total cards are equal. Players with no cards not included in the list.

As of end of season.

Rank	No.	Pos.	Nat.	Name	A-League Men			Australia Cup			Total		
Rank	No.	Pos.	Nat.	Name	Booked	(yellow card) (yellow-red card)	Sent off (straight red)	Booked	(yellow card) (yellow-red card)	Sent off (straight red)	Booked	(yellow card) (yellow-red card)	Sent off (straight red)
1	11	FW	(Australia)	Carlo Armiento	3	0	1	0	0	0	3	0	1
2	4	DF	(Canada)	Manjrekar James	1	0	1	0	0	0	1	0	1
3	14	MF	(New Zealand)	Alex Rufer	8	0	0	0	0	0	8	0	0
4	7	FW	(Nigeria)	Ifeanyi Eze	5	0	0	0	0	0	5	0	0
5	15	DF	(New Zealand)	Isaac Hughes	4	0	0	0	0	0	4	0	0
6	8	MF	(Australia)	Paulo Retre	2	0	0	1	0	0	3	0	0
6	25	MF	(Japan)	Kazuki Nagasawa	2	0	0	1	0	0	3	0	0
8	1	GK	(England)	Josh Oluwayemi	2	0	0	0	0	0	2	0	0
8	3	DF	(New Zealand)	Corban Piper	2	0	0	0	0	0	2	0	0
8	18	DF	(New Zealand)	Lukas Kelly-Heald	2	0	0	0	0	0	2	0	0
8	24	DF	(New Zealand)	Xuan Loke	0	0	0	2	0	0	2	0	0
12	6	DF	(New Zealand)	Tim Payne	0	0	0	1	0	0	1	0	0
12	16	MF	(Norway)	Sander Kartum	1	0	0	0	0	0	1	0	0
12	20	MF	(Lebanon)	Ramy Najjarine	1	0	0	0	0	0	1	0	0
12	27	DF	(New Zealand)	Matthew Sheridan	1	0	0	0	0	0	1	0	0
12	29	DF	(New Zealand)	Luke Brooke-Smith	1	0	0	0	0	0	1	0	0
Total					35	0	2	5	0	0	40	0	2

=== Clean sheets ===
Includes all competitions. The list is sorted by squad number when total clean sheets are equal. Numbers in parentheses represent games where both goalkeepers participated and both kept a clean sheet; the number in parentheses is awarded to the goalkeeper who was substituted on, whilst a full clean sheet is awarded to the goalkeeper who was on the field at the start of play. Goalkeepers with no clean sheets not included in the list.

As of end of season.

Rank	No.	Nat.	Goalkeeper	A-League Men	Australia Cup	Total
1	40	(New Zealand)	Eamonn McCarron	2	1	3
2	1	(England)	Josh Oluwayemi	2	0	2
Total				4	1	5

== End of season awards ==
Wellington Phoenix season awards
Award	Winner
Members' under-23 player of the year	Isaac Hughes
Members' player of the year	Ifeanyi Eze
Men's goal of the year	Alex Rufer (Rd 7 vs Auckland FC)
Golden boot	Ifeanyi Eze (10)
Media player of the year	Ifeanyi Eze
Players' player of the year	Alex Rufer
Entelar & OPPO men's player of the year	Alex Rufer & Ifeanyi Eze
Lloyd Morrison Spirit of the Phoenix award	Mackenzie Barry (women)

== See also ==
- 2025–26 Wellington Phoenix FC (women) season
