= Sander Kartum =

Norwegian footballer (born 1995)

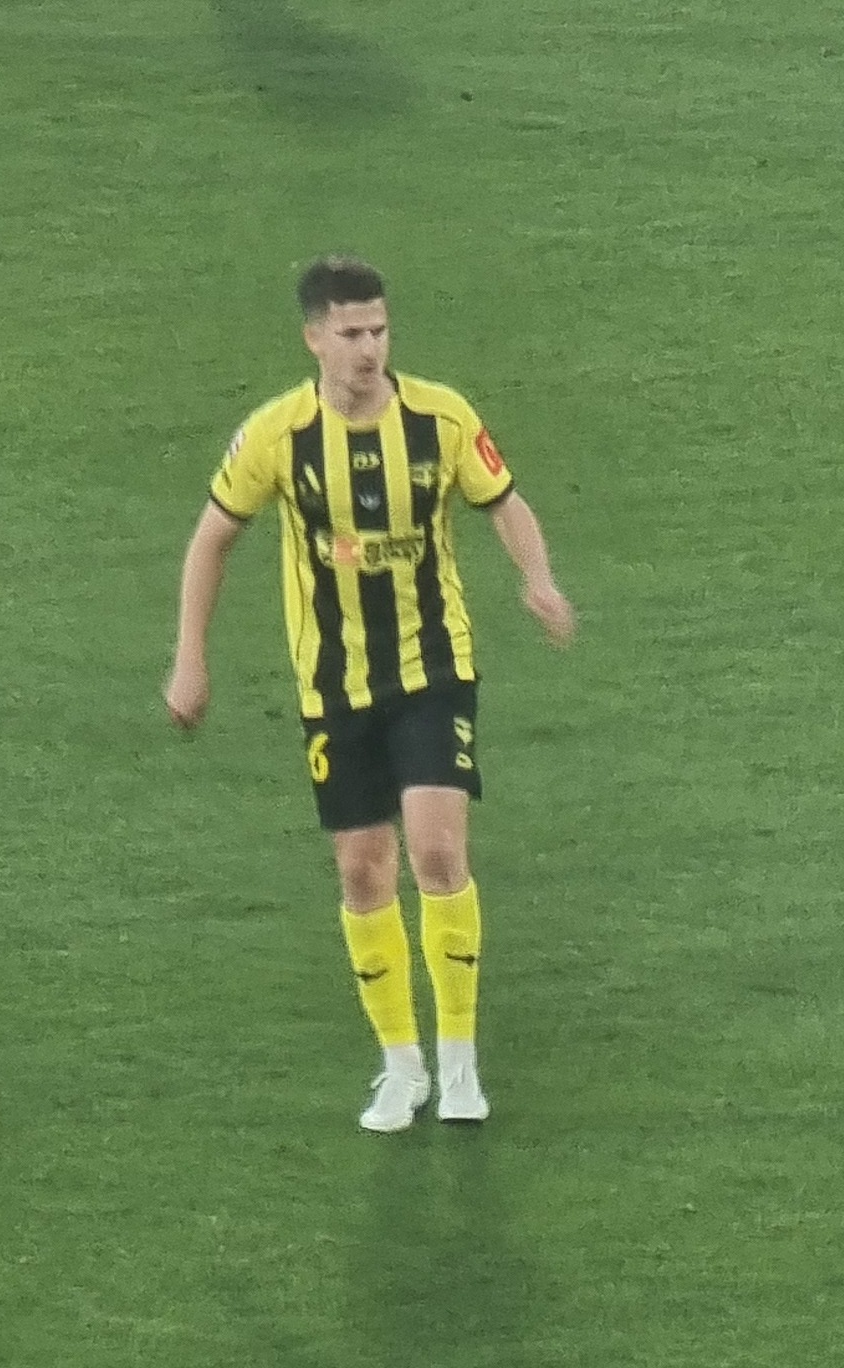
- Kartum playing for the Wellington Phoenix in 2026.

Personal information
- Full name: Sander Erik Kartum
- Date of birth: 3 October 1995 (age 31)
- Place of birth: Stjørdal, Norway
- Position: Midfielder

Team information
- Current team: Aalesund
- Number: 19

Youth career
- –2011: Lånke
- 2012: Stjørdals-Blink

Senior career*
Years	Team	Apps	(Gls)
2012–2020	Stjørdals-Blink	143	(26)
2021–2023	Kristiansund	64	(9)
2023–2025	Brann	40	(7)
2025–2026	Heart of Midlothian	11	(3)
2026	→ Wellington Phoenix (loan)	12	(2)
2026–	Aalesund	0	(0)
- * Club domestic league appearances and goals as of 3 July 2026

Sander Erik Kartum (born 3 October 1995) is a Norwegian professional footballer who plays as a midfielder for Eliteserien side Aalesund. Kartum has previously played for Stjørdals-Blink, Kristiansund, Brann, Heart of Midlothian and Wellington Phoenix.

== Career ==
He started his youth career in Lånke, switching to Stjørdals-Blink in 2012. He made his senior debut in the summer of 2012, and took part in the team's rise from the 3. divisjon to the 1. divisjon. Ahead of the 2021 season he was bought by Kristiansund. He made his Eliteserien debut in May 2021 against Molde and scored his first goal later that month.

Kartum was given the Player of the Year award in the 2020 1. divisjon by the Norwegian News Agency.

=== Hearts ===
On 24 January 2025, Kartum signed for Scottish Premiership club Heart of Midlothian on a two-and-a-half year deal for an undisclosed fee.

On 1 September 2026, Kartum's contract with Hearts was cancelled by mutual consent.

==== Wellington Phoenix (loan) ====
On 16 January 2026, A-League Men club Wellington Phoenix signed Kartum on loan until the end of the 2025–26 season. On 23 January, Kartum made his Phoenix debut and scored a few minutes after being substituted in. The Phoenix would go on to lose 4–1 away to the Newcastle Jets.
