= Daniel Edwards (footballer) =

New Zealand footballer

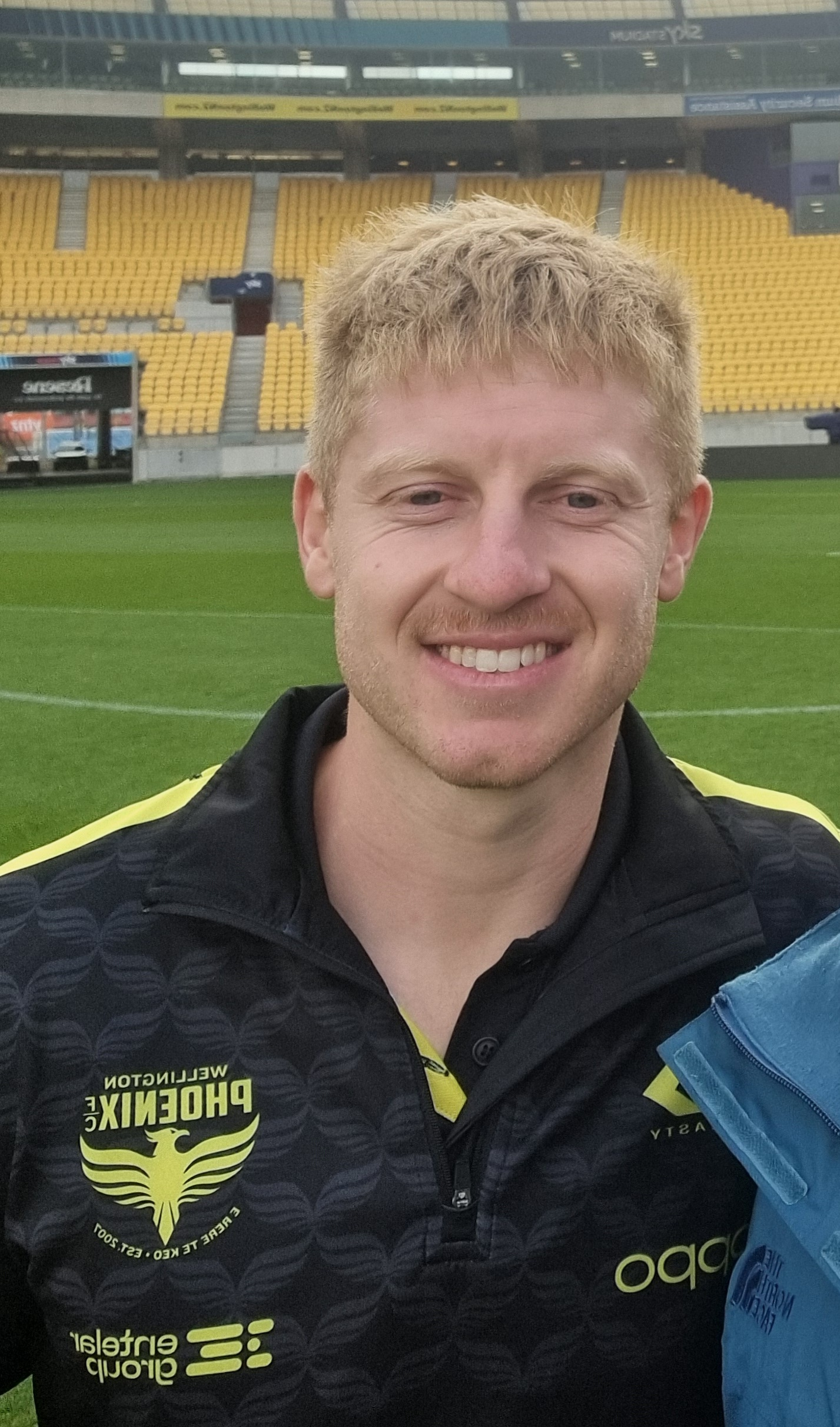
- Edwards photographed in 2026 as part of the Wellington Phoenix.

Personal information
- Full name: Daniel Edwards
- Date of birth: 6 August 1998 (age 28)
- Place of birth: Auckland, New Zealand
- Position: Defender

Team information
- Current team: Preston Lions
- Number: 3

Youth career
- Hibiscus Coast
- Forrest Hill Milford United
- Birkenhead United

College career
Years	Team	Apps	(Gls)
2017	Marshall Thundering Herd	12	(1)
2018	Missouri State Bears	6	(0)
2019–21	Marshall Thundering Herd	0	(0)

Senior career*
Years	Team	Apps	(Gls)
2016–17	Hamilton Wanderers	1	(0)
2016–17	Eastern Suburbs	13	(1)
2021	Eastern Suburbs	4	(0)
2021–2024	Port Melbourne	74	(2)
2024–2025	Avondale	32	(3)
2025–2026	Wellington Phoenix	8	(0)
2026–	Preston Lions	0	(0)
- * Club domestic league appearances and goals as of 17 April 2026

Daniel Edwards (born 6 August 1998) is a New Zealand professional footballer who plays as a defender for Preston Lions in the Australian Championship.

== Club career ==
=== Youth career ===
Edwards played his youth football for Hibiscus Coast, Forrest Hill Milford United and Birkenhead United before joining Hamilton Wanderers for the 2016–17 NZFC Premiership. He made one appearance, coming on as a second-half substitute against Southern United.

=== College career ===
In 2017, Edwards joined Marshall Thundering Herd as a Freshman, to study accounting, where he made 12 appearances and scored one goal. In 2018, he pent the year at Missouri State Bears making six appearances. After the 2018 season he returned to Marshall Thundering Herd but did not make any appearances.

=== Eastern Suburbs ===
After having his time in the United States cut short due to COVID-19 pandemic in the United States, Edwards returned to New Zealand and signed for Eastern Suburbs.

=== Port Melbourne ===
Edwards signed for Port Melbourne during the 2021 season.

=== Avondale ===
Edwards signed for Avondale in July 2024.

=== Wellington Phoenix ===
On 15 September 2025, Edwards signed for Wellington Phoenix. He made his professional debut on 8 November 2025, aged 27, against Auckland FC. On 29 May 2026, the Phoenix confirmed Edwards' departure from the club.

== Career statistics ==
=== Club ===
As of match played on 23 January 2026.

Appearances and goals by club, season and competition
Club	Season	League			Cup		Others		Total	
Club	Season	Division	Apps	Goals	Apps	Goals	Apps	Goals	Apps	Goals
Hamilton Wanderers	2016–17	NZ Premiership	1	0	—		—		1	0
Eastern Suburbs	2016–17	NZ Premiership	13	1	—		1 (Note: Appearance in New Zealand Football Championship play-offs)	0	14	1
Eastern Suburbs	2021	National League	4	0	0	0	—		4	0
Eastern Suburbs	Total		17	1	0	0	1	0	18	1
Port Melbourne	2021	NPL Victoria	6	0	1	0	—		7	0
Port Melbourne	2022	NPL Victoria	26	0	—		1 (Note: Appearance in NPL Victoria finals)	0	27	0
Port Melbourne	2023	NPL Victoria	23	2	—		—		23	2
Port Melbourne	2024	NPL Victoria	19	0	—		—		19	0
Port Melbourne	Total		74	2	1	0	1	0	76	2
Avondale	2024	NPL Victoria	7	0	0	0	1	0	8	0
Avondale	2025	NPL Victoria	25	3	1	0	5 (Note: One appearance in NPL Victoria finals; Four appearances in Dockerty Cup/Australia Cup qualifiers)	0	31	3
Avondale	Total		32	3	1	0	6	0	39	3
Wellington Phoenix	2025–26	A-League Men	3	0	0	0	—		3	0
Career total			127	6	2	0	8	0	137	6
