= Ifeanyi Eze =

Nigerian footballer (born 1999)

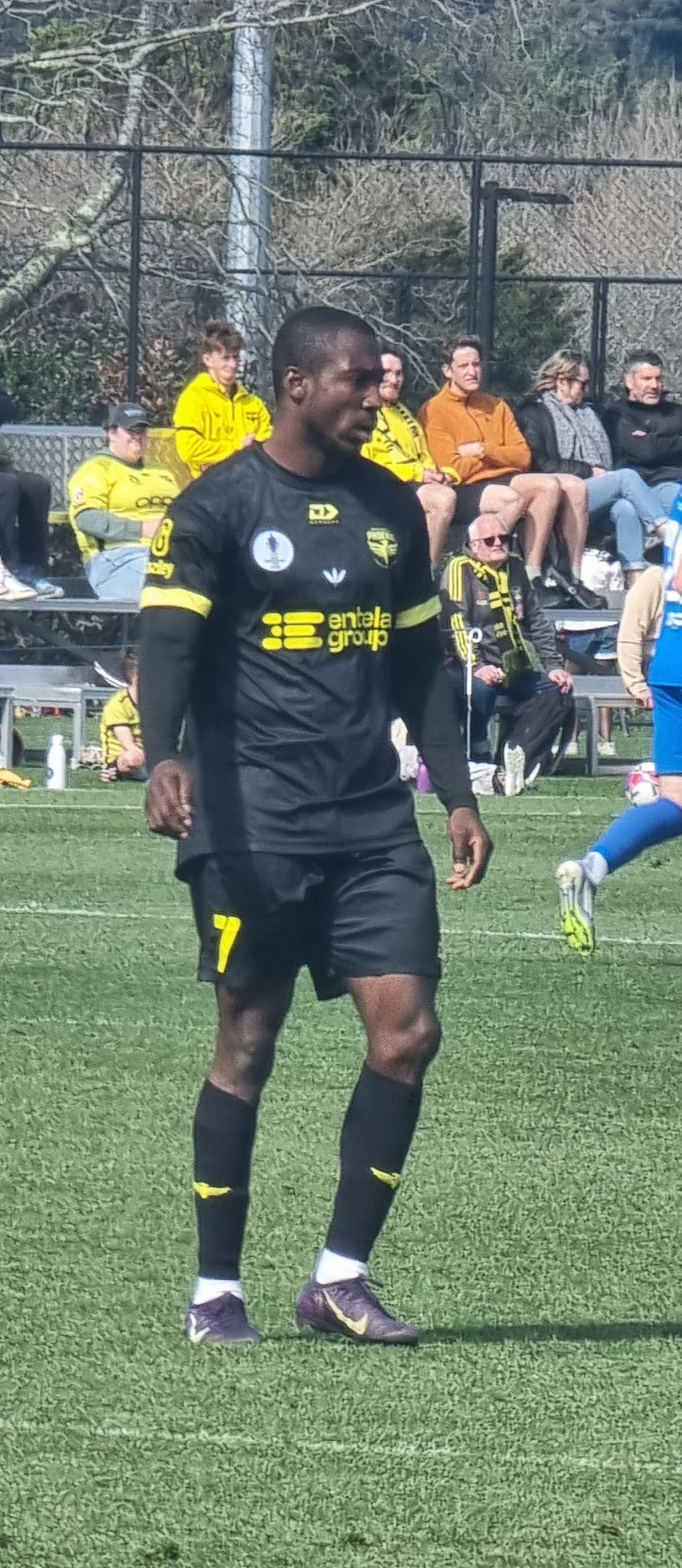
- Eze playing for the Wellington Phoenix in 2025.

Personal information
- Date of birth: 7 May 1999 (age 27)
- Place of birth: Enugu, Nigeria
- Height: 1.80 m (5 ft 11 in)
- Position: Forward

Youth career
- 2014: P Sports Football Academy

Senior career*
Years	Team	Apps	(Gls)
2018–2020	FC Ifeanyi Ubah		
2020–2021	Akwa United	5	(0)
2021–2022	Kano Pillars	33	(7)
2022–2023	Al-Suqoor	0	(0)
2023–2024	Al-Hilal Benghazi	7	(2)
2024–2025	Al-Karkh SC	37	(15)
2025–2026	Wellington Phoenix	25	(10)
2026–	Erbil SC	11	(3)
- * Club domestic league appearances and goals as of 31 October 2026

Ifeanyi Eze (Igbo: [í.fɛ́.ā.ɲí ɛ́.zè]; born 7 May 1999) is a Nigerian footballer who plays as a forward for Iraq Stars League club Erbil SC.

== Career ==
=== Al-Karkh SC ===
In the 2024–25 season, Eze scored 15 goals in 34 league appearances for Al-Karkh SC of the Iraq Stars League.

=== Wellington Phoenix ===
In July 2025, Eze signed for A-League Men club Wellington Phoenix on a 1-year contract. Eze made his club debut on 10 August 2025, in a 1–0 win away to Nunawading City in the round of 16 of the Australia Cup. In the opening round of the 2025–26 A-League Men season, Eze made his league debut and scored his debut goal for the Phoenix in a 2–2 draw with Perth Glory ay HBF Park on 18 October 2025. Eze made his New Zealand Derby debut at Sky Stadium in a 2–1 loss to Auckland FC, scoring Phoenix's equaliser in the 9th minute. Eze finished his debut A-League Men season with 10 goals and one assist in 25 matches, finishing second in the Golden Boot standings behind Sam Cosgrove and Luka Jovanović.

On 28 April, Wellington Phoenix confirmed they expected Eze to depart the club for an overseas move, with director of football Shaun Gill stating the club were unlikely to match the offers being made for the Nigerian forward. "We won’t be able to compete with what’s coming for him, but both parties have kept the door open should things not be where he wants them in the next weeks, months," Gill said. On 8 June, the club confirmed Eze's departure.

== Career statistics ==
As of match played 28 April 2026

Appearances and goals by club, season and competition
Club	Season	League			National cup (Note: Includes Australia Cup)		Continental		Total	
Club	Season	Division	Apps	Goals	Apps	Goals	Apps	Goals	Apps	Goals
Kano Pillars	2020–21	Nigeria Professional Football League	4	1	0	0	–		4	1
Kano Pillars	2021–22	Nigeria Professional Football League	27	6	0	0	–		27	6
Kano Pillars	Total		31	7	0	0	0	0	31	7
Al Hilal Benghazi	2023–24	Libyan Premier League	3	3	0	0	4 (Note: Appearances in CAF Confederation Cup)	2	7	5
Ahly Nabatieh	2023–24	Lebanese Premier League	1	1	0	0	–		1	1
Al-Karkh	2024–25	Iraq Stars League	14	15	0	0	–		14	15
Wellington Phoenix	2025–26	A-League Men	25	10	2	0	–		27	10
Career total			74	36	2	0	4	2	80	38

== Honours ==
Ahly Nabatieh

- Lebanese Federation Cup runner-up: 2023
