= Anaru Cassidy =

New Zealand footballer

- Cassidy playing for the Wellington Phoenix in 2026.

Personal information
- Full name: Anaru Henri Carbonatto Cassidy
- Date of birth: 26 February 2006 (age 20)
- Place of birth: Gisborne, New Zealand
- Height: 1.82 m (6 ft 0 in)
- Position: Midfielder

Team information
- Current team: Wellington Phoenix
- Number: 37

Youth career
- Waterside Karori
- Western Suburbs

Senior career*
Years	Team	Apps	(Gls)
2022	Lower Hutt City	3	(0)
2022–	Wellington Phoenix Reserves	47	(6)
2025–	Wellington Phoenix	1	(0)

International career^{‡}
2023	New Zealand U17	6	(0)
- * Club domestic league appearances and goals as of 2 November 2025 ‡ National team caps and goals as of 14 January 2023

Anaru Henri Carbonatto Cassidy (born 26 February 2006) is a New Zealand professional footballer who plays as a midfielder for the Wellington Phoenix.

== Club career ==
=== Youth career ===
Cassidy played his youth football for Waterside Karori and Western Suburbs before joining the Wellington Phoenix Academy in 2022. He spent the 2022 season at Lower Hutt City before playing for the 'Nix Reserves in 2023.

=== Wellington Phoenix ===
Cassidy playing for Wellington Phoenix in 2026.

Cassidy made his professional debut for the Wellington Phoenix on 2 November 2025 in an A-League Men match against Central Coast Mariners. Head coach Giancarlo Italiano described Cassidy as "one of the smartest players that have come through the academy". On 12 November 2025, Cassidy was awarded a scholarship contract by the Nix for two years.

== International career ==
Cassidy was called up for the New Zealand U17's for 2023 OFC U-17 Championship on 14 December 2022. He made his debut on 11 January 2023, in a 3–2 win over New Caledonia. On 31 October 2023, Cassidy was called up to the New Zealand U17 squad for the 2023 FIFA U-17 World Cup, making two appearances.

== Career statistics ==
=== Club ===
As of match played on 2 November 2025.

Appearances and goals by club, season and competition
Club	Season	League			Cup		Others		Total	
Club	Season	Division	Apps	Goals	Apps	Goals	Apps	Goals	Apps	Goals
Lower Hutt City	2022	National League	3	0	0	0	—		3	0
Wellington Phoenix Reserves	2023	National League	9	1	—		—		9	1
Wellington Phoenix Reserves	2024	National League	22	1	1	0	—		23	1
Wellington Phoenix Reserves	2025	National League	16	4	1	0	—		17	4
Wellington Phoenix Reserves	Total		47	6	2	0	—		49	6
Wellington Phoenix	2025–26	A-League Men	1	0	0	0	—		1	0
Career total			51	6	2	0	0	0	53	6

== Honours ==
New Zealand U17

- OFC U-17 Championship: 2023
