= Eamonn McCarron =

New Zealand footballer

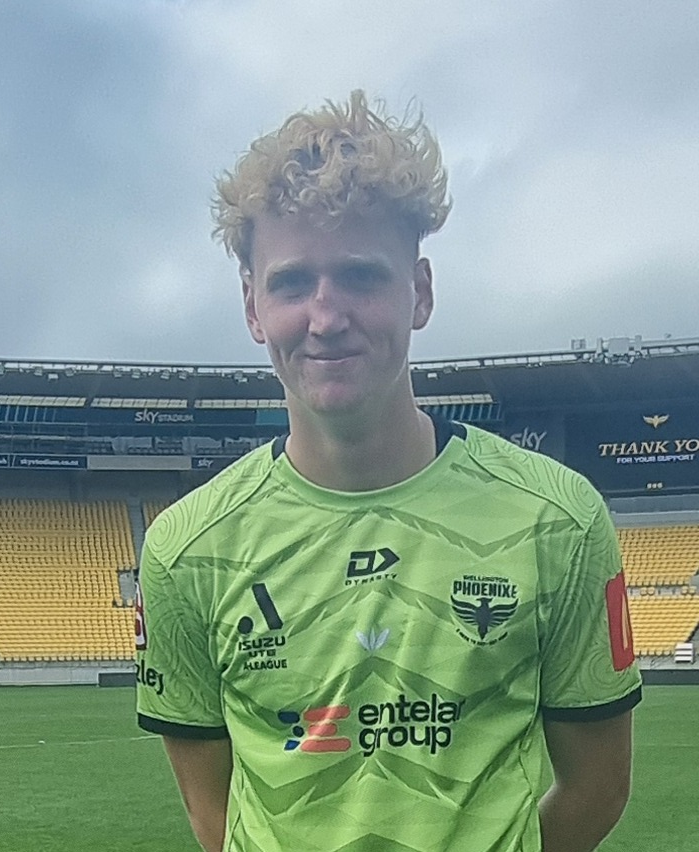
- McCarron photographed in 2026 after a match for the Wellington Phoenix.

Personal information
- Full name: Eamonn Kaspar Finley McCarron
- Date of birth: 14 September 2007 (age 19)
- Place of birth: New Zealand
- Height: 1.99 m (6 ft 6 in)
- Position: Goalkeeper

Team information
- Current team: Wellington Phoenix
- Number: 40

Youth career
- Western Suburbs
- 2022–2024: Wellington Phoenix

Senior career*
Years	Team	Apps	(Gls)
2022–	Wellington Phoenix Reserves	15	(0)
2022	→ Lower Hutt City (loan)	6	(0)
2025–	Wellington Phoenix	6	(0)

International career^{‡}
2024–	New Zealand U17	1	(0)
- * Club domestic league appearances and goals as of 23 January 2026 ‡ National team caps and goals as of 14 January 2023

Eamonn Kaspar Finley McCarron (born 14 September 2007) is a New Zealand professional footballer who plays as a goalkeeper for the Wellington Phoenix.

== Club career ==
=== Youth career ===
McCarron attended St Patrick's College, Wellington.

=== Wellington Phoenix ===
McCarron made his professional debut for the Wellington Phoenix on 10 August 2025 in an Australia Cup match against Nunawading City. The Phoenix won 1–0, with McCarron keeping a clean sheet. McCarron made his A-League Men debut on 21 December 2025 after starting goalkeeper Josh Oluwayemi suffered an injury 10 minutes into the match. On 3 January 2026, the Phoenix defeated Brisbane Roar away with McCarron keeping the team's first clean sheet of the A-League season. Head coach Giancarlo Italiano praised McCarron for his performance.

On 28 May 2026, McCarron was signed to his first professional contract with the Phoenix. The club signed him until the end of the 2028–29 season.

== International career ==
McCarron was called up for the New Zealand U17's for 2023 OFC U-17 Championship on 14 December 2022. He made his debut on 14 January 2023, in a 11–0 win over American Samoa. On 31 October 2023, McCarron was called up to the New Zealand U17 squad for the 2023 FIFA U-17 World Cup, yet didn't make an appearance.

McCarron was first called up for the New Zealand U20's for the 2024 OFC U-19 Men's Championship, though he did not make an appearance.

== Career statistics ==
=== Club ===
As of match played on 11 January 2026.

Appearances and goals by club, season and competition
Club	Season	League			Cup		Others		Total	
Club	Season	Division	Apps	Goals	Apps	Goals	Apps	Goals	Apps	Goals
Wellington Phoenix Reserves	2022	National League	0	0	—		—		0	0
Wellington Phoenix Reserves	2023	National League	0	0	—		—		0	0
Wellington Phoenix Reserves	2024	National League	3	0	1	0	—		4	0
Wellington Phoenix Reserves	2025	National League	12	0	1	0	—		13	0
Wellington Phoenix Reserves	Total		15	0	2	0	—		17	0
Lower Hutt City (loan)	2022	National League	6	0	2	0	—		8	0
Wellington Phoenix	2025–26	A-League Men	6	0	1	0	—		7	0
Career total			27	0	5	0	0	0	32	0

== Honours ==
New Zealand U17

- OFC U-17 Championship: 2023

New Zealand U20

- OFC U-19 Championship: 2024
