= Carlo Armiento =

Australian soccer player

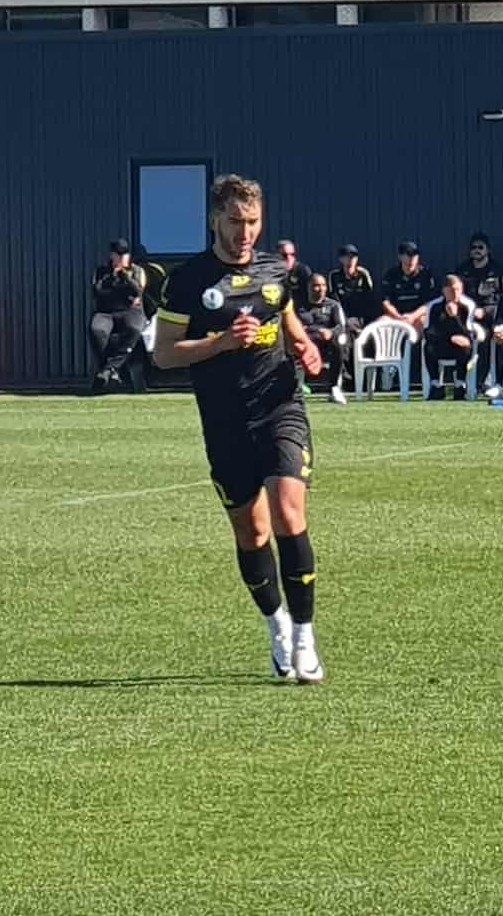
- Armiento playing for the Wellington Phoenix in 2025.

Personal information
- Date of birth: 4 June 1999 (age 27)
- Place of birth: Adelaide, Australia
- Height: 1.79 m (5 ft 10 in)
- Positions: Striker; winger

Team information
- Current team: Garudayaksa
- Number: 17

Youth career
- Adelaide City
- –2016: SA NTC

Senior career*
Years	Team	Apps	(Gls)
2017	Adelaide City	12	(1)
2018–2019	Adelaide United NPL	33	(15)
2018–2019	Adelaide United	5	(0)
2020–2022	Perth Glory	26	(3)
2022–2024	Brisbane Roar	36	(3)
2024–2025	Turris	14	(1)
2025–2026	Wellington Phoenix	22	(5)
2026–	Garudayaksa	1	(0)
- * Club domestic league appearances and goals as of 11 September 2026

Carlo Armiento (Italian: [ˈkar.lo arˈmjɛn.to]; born 4 June 1999) is an Australian professional soccer player who plays as a left winger for Super League club Garudayaksa.

== Career ==
=== Adelaide United ===
On 23 August 2018, Armiento signed his first professional contract with Adelaide United, penning a two-year scholarship deal with the club. He made his professional debut in a Round 7 clash with Melbourne Victory, replacing Apostolos Stamatelopoulos in the 80th minute as the Reds were defeated 2–0 at AAMI Park. Armiento was released on 12 December 2019.

=== Perth Glory ===
Carlo was announced as a Perth Glory player on 5 February 2020, having been signed as a free agent following his release from Adelaide.

He first appeared with Perth in their quarter-final clash against Wellington Phoenix which Glory won 2–0 as an unused substitute, and again four days later against Sydney FC as they lost the match 2–0, once again not coming off the bench.

Armiento got his first minutes of football for Glory on 30 November 2020 after coming on as a substitute against Shanghai Shenhua in their Asian Champions League campaign in the 57th minute, and marked his debut by scoring a free-kick in a game which ended 3–3.

On 20 January 2021, Armiento made his A-League debut for the Glory in their first game of the season, coming on as a substitute in the sixty-ninth minute. He scored his first A-League goal from close range to make the score 5–1 to Perth against Adelaide United, his former club; the match resulted in a 5–3 win for Perth.

=== Brisbane Roar ===
In September 2022, Armiento signed for the Brisbane Roar. Between 2022 and 2024, he made 36 A-League Men appearances and scored 3 goals.

=== Turris ===
Armiento played for Turris of Italian Serie C in the 2024–25 season.

=== Wellington Phoenix ===
On 22 July 2025, the Wellington Phoenix announced the signing of Armiento on a one-year contract. Armiento was close to signing for a new Serie C club before being called by Phoenix head coach Giancarlo Italiano, convincing him to return to the A-League Men and sign for the New Zealand club. Armiento made his club debut on 10 August 2025, in a 1–0 win away to Nunawading City in the round of 16 of the Australia Cup. He assisted Hideki Ishige from a corner in the 94th minute.

Armiento made his league debut for the Phoenix on 18 October 2025, scoring the equalising goal in a 2–2 draw away to Perth Glory.

On 29 May 2026, the club confirmed Armiento's departure.

== Personal life ==
On 14 March 2024, Armiento was diagnosed with stage two Hodgkin's lymphoma. Initially, Armiento believed it may have been long covid. However, his teammate Nikola Mileusnic encouraged him to get his ongoing cough checked and after an x-ray, where they found a nine centimetre mass inside his lung, this was later confirmed as Hodgkin's lymphoma. Armiento began chemotherapy on 5 April 2024. After a year of treatment, his doctor confirmed he was all clear.
