= Lloyd Morrison =

New Zealand investment banker (1957–2012)

Lloyd Morrison CNZM
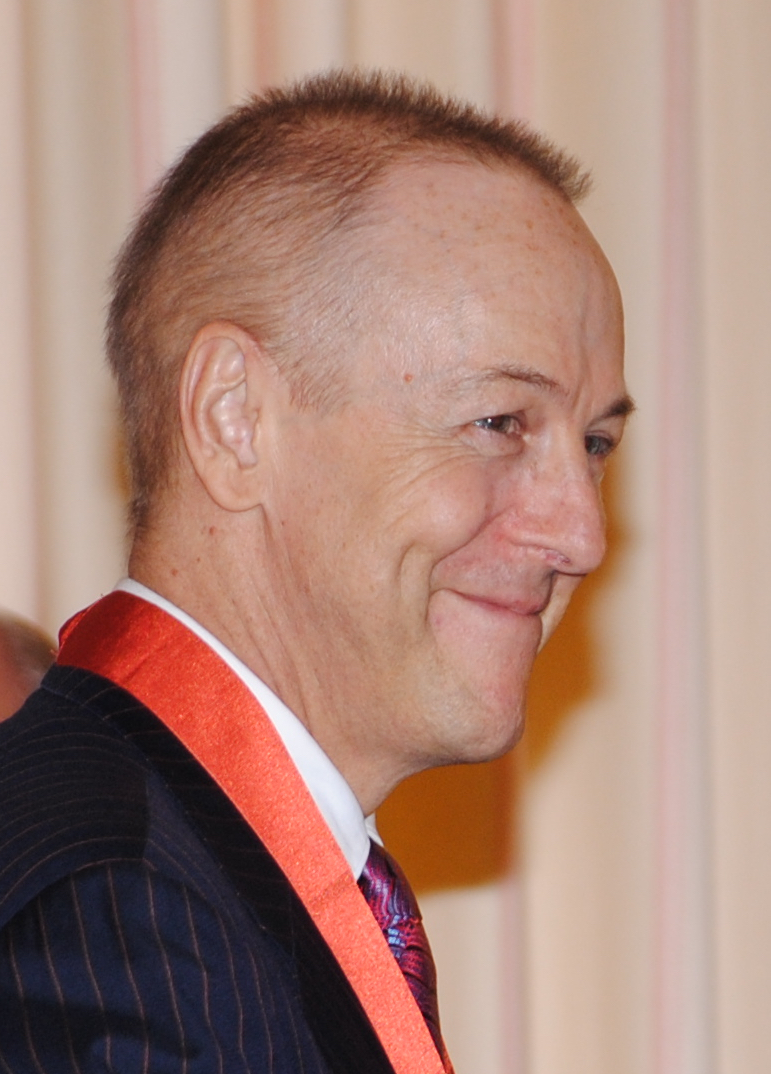
- Morrison in 2010
- Born: 18 September 1957; Palmerston North, New Zealand
- Died: 10 February 2012 (aged 54); Seattle, Washington, United States
- Education: University of Canterbury, LLB (Hons)
- Occupation: Businessman
- Spouse: Julie Nevett

Hugh Richmond Lloyd Morrison CNZM (18 September 1957 – 10 February 2012) was a Wellington, New Zealand-based investment banker and entrepreneur. He founded H.R.L. Morrison & Co in 1988, and Morrison & Co launched the infrastructure company Infratil in 1994.

== Early life ==
Lloyd Morrison came from Palmerston North. He was educated at Wanganui Collegiate School. He studied law at the University of Canterbury from which he graduated with LL.B. (Hons).

== Business ==
Morrison's career began in the early 1980s as an investment analyst with Jarden & Co (now Jarden) and later as a partner of O'Connor Grieve & Co. He became executive chairman of OmniCorp, a New Zealand listed investment company based in London, in 1985; the company was sold in 1988.

Morrison formed H.R.L. Morrison & Co in 1988 offering a broad range of investment advisory services across sectors. In the early 1990s Morrison & Co narrowed its focus to infrastructure as major privatisations took place in Australia and New Zealand. Morrison & Co was an active investor and adviser in privatisations of Australasian airports, ports and energy businesses. In 1994 Morrison launched Infratil, one of the world's first listed infrastructure funds, with Morrison & Co retained as the Manager. Morrison & Co has offices in Brisbane, Sydney, Auckland and Hong Kong and in March 2006 was appointed to a global infrastructure mandate by the New Zealand Superannuation Fund. In 2009, Morrison & Co launched the Public Infrastructure Partnership Fund (PIP Fund), New Zealand's first fund dedicated to investing in PPPs.

Lloyd Morrison was named New Zealand Executive of the Year by Deloitte/Management magazine in 2007. He was also named "Business Leader of the Year" by the New Zealand Herald in 2006. In 2007 he was ranked 12th on the New Zealand Listener Power List. He was appointed a Companion of the New Zealand Order of Merit, for services to business, in the 2010 New Year Honours. In August 2011 the Morrison Index, the first investable index was launched by NZX. It is designed to represent the strength and attractiveness of New Zealand's listed infrastructure sector. The NZX release of February 2011 stated "NZX plans to name the indices after individuals who have made outstanding efforts to develop and advance the related sector. The Investable Infrastructure Index will be named after Lloyd Morrison CNZM, in recognition of his instrumental contribution to the New Zealand infrastructure sector at many levels, including an enormous impact on quality and efficiency, and in taking New Zealand infrastructure exports globally to Australia, the US and the UK."

In 2011, Morrison was honoured by Wellington Businesses Gold Awards with a lifetime achievement award, and late November he was named Visionary Leader by Deloitte/Management magazine. "The Visionary Leader award honour roll contains the names of many of our legendary business figures, and Lloyd Morrison deserves his place alongside them. From his successful battle to save the New Zealand Stock Exchange, to his patronage of the arts, and from his foundation of Infratil to his campaign for a new flag for New Zealand, Lloyd's depth of vision continues to shine through."

=== Directorships ===
- OmniCorp, Chairman 1985–1988
- Infratil Australia Limited 1995–2000
- Wellington Airport 1998–2007
- Port of Tauranga 1999–2005
- New Zealand Exchange, Deputy chairman 2002–2005
- H.R.L. Morrison & Co, Chairman 1988–2012
- TrustPower 2002–2010
- Infratil 2002–2012
- Infratil Airports Europe, 2004–2012
- Auckland International Airport 2007–2012
- Fisher Funds Management 2008–2012

== Other ==
Morrison was an active supporter of the arts in New Zealand. He founded the HRL Morrison Music Trust in 1995 as a vehicle to support and promote New Zealand's finest musicians and composers, with a special emphasis on the production and marketing of recordings through its record label, Trust Records. He was a trustee of the Chamber Music NZ Foundation and a director of the New Zealand Symphony Orchestra.

Morrison was active in several high-profile public campaigns. He launched a campaign to change the Flag of New Zealand in 2003, and in 2008 published a discussion document titled "A Measurable Goal for New Zealand" with the intent of identifying a common goal that all of New Zealand can support and aspire to. Morrison was a trustee of Pure Advantage, the organisation championing a move to a green growth economy for New Zealand to secure its share of the $6 trillion global opportunity that green growth promises by 2050. In September 2011 it was announced that Morrison was one of the consortium of local businessmen who had bought the Wellington Phoenix FC, the only professional football team in New Zealand.

== Death ==
In early 2009 Morrison was diagnosed as having leukaemia. He died from leukaemia on 10 February 2012, aged 54, in Seattle. He was survived by his wife and five children. Prime Minister John Key, who first met Morrison when they were both merchant bankers, spoke at his funeral.

In 2015, Morrison was posthumously inducted into the New Zealand Business Hall of Fame.
