= Wellington Phoenix FC =

Association football club based in New Zealand

Wellington Phoenix
- Full name: Wellington Phoenix Football Club
- Nickname: The Nix
- Founded: 19 March 2007; 19 years ago
- Ground: Hnry Stadium
- Capacity: 34,500
- Owner: Welnix Group
- Chairman: Robert Morrison
- Manager: Chris Greenacre
- League: A-League Men
- 2025–26: 8th of 12
- Website: www.wellingtonphoenix.com
Home colours	Away colours	Third colours

Wellington Phoenix Football Club is a professional football club based in Wellington, New Zealand. It competes in the Australian A-League Men, under licence from Football Federation Australia. Phoenix entered the competition in the 2007–08 season after its formation in March 2007, by New Zealand Football to replace New Zealand Knights as a New Zealand-based club in the Australian A-League competition. Since 2011, the club has been owned by Welnix, a consortium of seven Wellington businessmen.

The club is one of the few clubs in the world to compete in a league of a different confederation (AFC) from that of the country where it is based (OFC). It plays matches at Hnry Stadium (formerly Sky Stadium), a 34,500-seat multi-purpose venue in Wellington. Their home kit consists of black and yellow stripes. Its highest achievement is reaching the A-League Preliminary Final in 2010 and the A-League Semi Final in 2024.

== History ==
=== Foundation ===
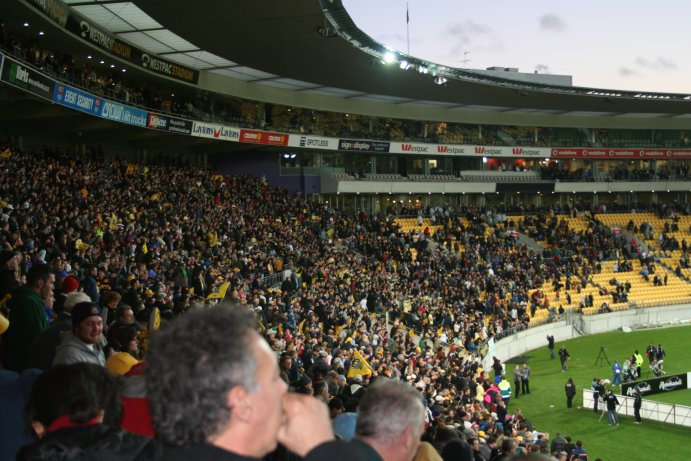
Crowd at the inaugural match of the Wellington Phoenix's maiden 2007–08 season.

During the later stages of the 2006–07 A-League season, Football Federation Australia (FFA) removed New Zealand Knights A-League licence due to the club's financial and administrative problems and poor on-field performance. After the resignation of the New Zealand Knights board, FFA transferred the licence to New Zealand Soccer (NZS, now New Zealand Football), which administered the club for the rest of the season before its subsequent dissolution.

FFA then provided NZS a provisional A-League licence to sub-let to a suitable New Zealand team to enter the 2007–08 A-League season. FFA set an application deadline to NZS and subsequently delayed that deadline to give more time for potential applicants in New Zealand to apply along with NZS support.

While NZS was given a chance to apply with a new sub-licensee, a Townsville-based consortium, Tropical Football Australia (TFA) also expressed interest and prepared an A-League application to replace the place previously held by the Knights. However, TFA eventually pulled out with the understanding of the FFA's preference to retain a New Zealand team for the league. TFA resubmitted its bid the following year as a potential A-League expansion franchise under the name "Northern Thunder FC", which was later changed to "North Queensland Thunder"; however, this bid died after expansion for the 2007–08 season was cancelled.

After much delay, the final amount needed for the application came from Wellington property businessman Terry Serepisos in the latter stages of the bid. Serepisos, the club's majority owner and chairman, provided NZD $1,250,000 to ensure the beginnings of a new New Zealand franchise and a continuation of New Zealand's participation in the A-League. FFA finalised a three-year A-League licence to New Zealand Football who then sub-let the licence to the Wellington-based club. The new Wellington club was confirmed on 19 March 2007.

The name for the new club was picked from a shortlist of six, pruned from 250 names suggested by the public, and was announced on 28 March 2007. Serepisos said of the name, that "It symbolises the fresh start, the rising from the ashes, and the incredible Wellington support that has come out".

Despite the backing of FIFA, AFC president Mohammed bin Hammam stated that due to AFC criteria, the Wellington team must move to Australia or disband by 2011. However, in an interview aired on SBS on 21 December 2008, FIFA president Sepp Blatter stated unequivocally, "It is not the matter of the Confederation, it is the matter of the FIFA Executive Committee... If Wellington will go on play on in Australian League, then as long as Australian league wants to have them and Wellington wants to stay (and) Both association in this case, New Zealand Soccer and Australian Football are happy with that then we will give them the blessing. The Confederation cannot interfere with that.".

=== Rise of the Phoenix ===
In the 2009–10 season, Wellington Phoenix became the first New Zealand side to reach the playoffs of an Australian football competition when Adelaide United beat Brisbane Roar 2–0 in the 26th round. It meant that Brisbane, which before the match was the only team outside the top six with a chance of making the playoffs, no longer could. The Phoenix overcame the Central Coast Mariners on 12 February 2010 to finish fourth, which meant it would host a playoff game against Perth Glory on 21 February 2010. The Phoenix beat Perth by penalty shootout (4–2) after 120 minutes (including 30 minutes of extra time). Phoenix then hosted a home game against Newcastle Jets on 7 March, which they won in extra time 3–1.

In the Preliminary Final against Sydney FC, the Phoenix lost 4–2 in controversial circumstances. After being locked at 1–1 through goals from Chris Payne for Sydney and Andrew Durante for Wellington, Payne apparently missed a header and deflected the ball into the goal off his hand. Andrew Durante, who was marking Payne went straight to the linesman, but the goal stood. "I went straight to the linesman. I knew 100 per cent it was handball. I spoke to the ref at halftime about it and he said it wasn't deliberate. It's pretty funny that one. Such a big game and such a big occasion, for something like that to change the game is very disappointing." Sydney FC strikers Alex Brosque and Mark Bridge both scored break-away goals as Phoenix pushed forward, and Eugène Dadi added a late consolation goal. Phoenix striker Chris Greenacre said that the error changed the dynamics of the game. "It just rips the heart out of you. We got back in the game with a good goal and that takes it away from you. It wasn't to be. I think we were right back in it. They played some good football but I thought we had withstood it OK. If we went into halftime [at 1–1] we were really confident we could get something out of it." Coach Ricki Herbert echoed those statements. The loss brought the end to the Phoenix's season, meaning that Melbourne Victory and Sydney FC would compete in the Grand Final.

On 20 April 2010, FFA granted Wellington Phoenix a five-year licence extension, keeping it in the competition until at least the conclusion of the 2015–16 season.

Many argue Wellington's ability to play in the A-League as being instrumental to the progress of the New Zealand national side and the wider football landscape.

=== Change of ownership ===
Prior to the 2011/12 season, it emerged that Serepisos was experiencing financial difficulties, both personally and in the property empire. This included highly publicised action by the Inland Revenue Department to liquidate a number of Serepisos' companies for unpaid taxes, including Century City Football Ltd, the company Serepisos owned the Phoenix through.

Initially, Serepisos claimed he had obtained finance through Swiss-based lenders, then announced he had agreed to a deal with Western Gulf Advisory, the Bahrain-based lender owned by Racing Santander owner Ahsan Ali Syed which would see 50% of the club sold. However, these funds were never received and the partial transfer never took place.

While the liquidation action was resolved through an unnamed third-party Serepisos' financial troubles did not end. Despite this, he stated he would not give up ownership of the club. Additional stories also emerged that coach Ricki Herbert was personally owed $100,000 in unpaid wages by the club.

However, on 23 September 2011, it was announced by Serepisos and the FFA that Serepisos had relinquished ownership of the club as a result of his ongoing financial difficulties. The club's licence was passed by the FFA to a new consortium of seven Wellington businessmen headed by Rob Morrison and including Gareth Morgan, Lloyd Morrison and John Morrison.

=== Change of head coach ===
On 26 February 2013, with the Phoenix sitting in last place, Ricki Herbert resigned from the position of head coach. The Phoenix had endured a poor run of results in a season where they were expected to be challenging for the title. Assistant Coach Chris Greenacre took the reins on an interim basis for the remainder of the season. Following a "worldwide search", Ernie Merrick was announced as the head coach on 20 May 2013. Merrick had six successful years at the Melbourne Victory, which was seen as important. Merrick will once again become the most experienced A-League coach in the coming season, retaking this from Herbert who passed him towards the end of the 2012–13 season. Greenacre was retained by Merrick as the assistant coach.

On 5 December 2017, Merrick resigned as head coach following the Phoenix's 2–0 loss to Adelaide United. On 2 January 2017, Des Buckingham took over as head coach, while Chris Greenacre was made co-coach.

On 1 March 2018, Wellington Phoenix announced that Darije Kalezic would be departing the club at the end of the season after they were not able to come to an agreement on how the club proceeds forward for the next season.

=== Rudan era ===
On 30 May 2018, Wellington Phoenix announced the appointment of former Sydney FC captain Marko Rudan as manager on a two-year contract. Rudan became the first-ever Wellington Phoenix coach to win his first game in charge when the Wellington Phoenix were 2–1 victors over Newcastle Jets in the opening round of the 2018–19 season. Following Round 2 clash with Brisbane Roar which ended in a 0–0 draw, it was the best start the team has had since the 2012/13 season. They suffered their first defeat of the season in Round 3 going down 3–0 to Western Sydney Wanderers. After a defeat in Round 5 against Adelaide United, Phoenix went on a 9-game undefeated streak including draws with Premiers Perth Glory and Champions Melbourne Victory, and wins over clubs like Sydney FC and Newcastle Jets. Their streak was broken by Sydney FC in round 15. The Phoenix finished in 6th place qualifying for the playoffs. On 15 April, it was announced that Rudan would not see out the second year of his contract and would leave at season's end for personal reasons. They were knocked out in the first elimination final by Melbourne Victory 3–1.

=== Talay era ===
On 4 May 2019, it was announced Ufuk Talay would be taking the reins of head coach after the departure of Marko Rudan on a one-year deal. In his first press conference, Talay expressed his idea of building a young team with a strong Kiwi core. He made his first signing with All Whites goalkeeper Stefan Marinovic and signed local Kiwi players, Te Atawhai Hudson-Wihongi, Tim Payne, and Callum McCowatt. Talay made his first import signing with Mexican Ulises Dávila following another import signing of English striker, David Ball. On 24 July, it was announced that Steven Taylor would be the captain heading into the new season while Alex Rufer was made vice-captain. On 18 August, it was announced that Phoenix had paid an undisclosed fee for Reno Piscopo, marking the first time the club paid a transfer fee for a player. Talay also made a handful of signings of young Australian players including Walter Scott, Jaushua Sotirio, Cammy Devlin, Liam McGing, and experienced centre-back Luke DeVere. Talay used his fourth import spot signing Matti Steinmann on a one-year deal. Talay had a positive start to his managerial tenure with the Wellington Phoenix when he led them to a 7–0 victory over Wairarapa United in a pre-season friendly in his first match in charge.

They were knocked-out of the 2019 FFA Cup in the Round of 32, losing 4–2 on penalties to Brisbane Strikers, after making an extraordinary comeback from 2–0 down to a 2–2 draw at full time.

On 22 May 2021, Wellington Phoenix broke their home attendance record, attracting 24,105 spectators against Western United FC. This game was the 2020–21 Hyundai A-League's most attended game. This was the first A-League game to be held in New Zealand since 15 March 2020, a total of 433 days in between.

On 14 April 2023, Talay announced that he would be leaving the club at the conclusion of his fourth season in charge citing ambitions to coach outside of the A-Leagues. However, the next season he was appointed head coach of an underperforming Sydney FC.

=== Italiano era ===
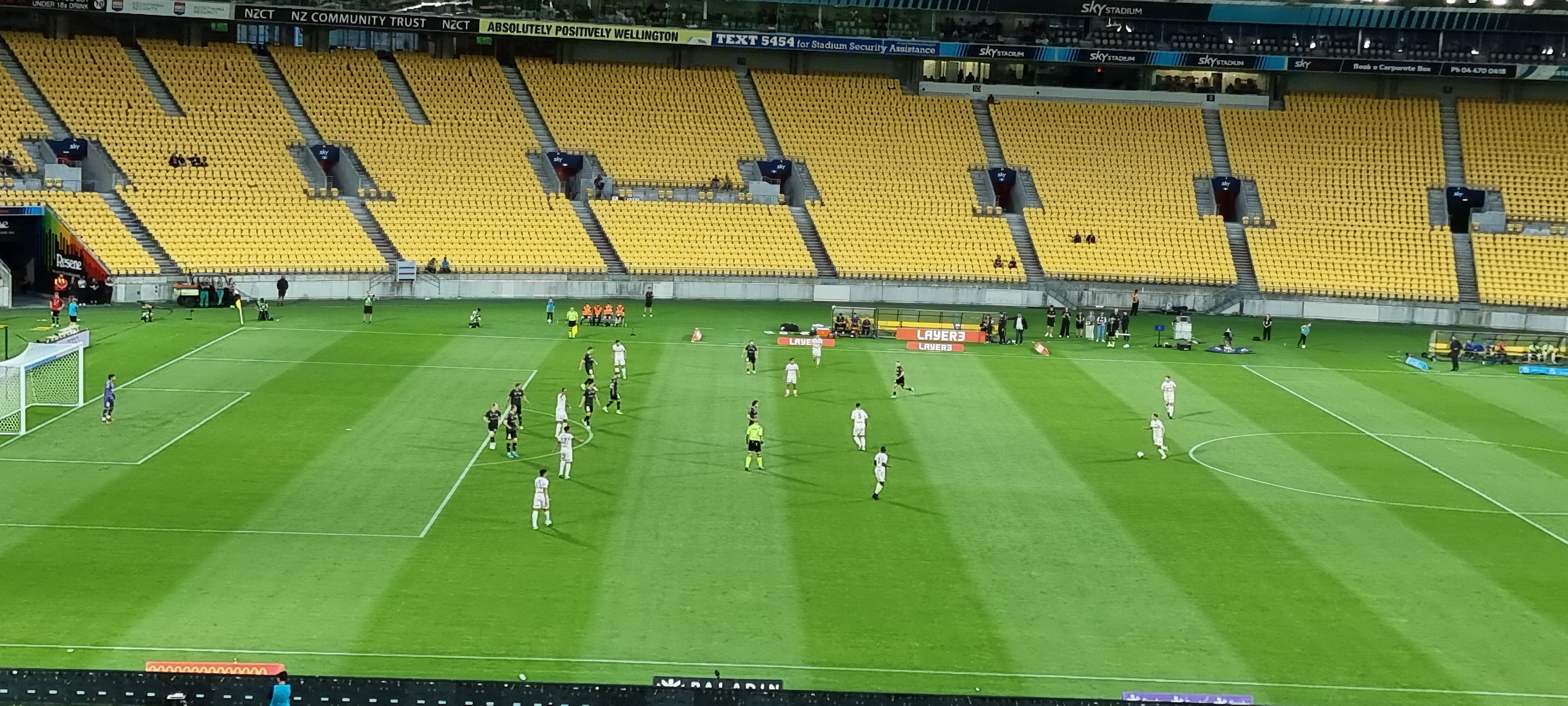
Wellington Phoenix playing against Melbourne Victory in January 2024.

On 18 April 2023, it was announced by the Wellington Phoenix that Giancarlo Italiano would become the new coach for the next two seasons. Italiano worked under Talay for the previous three seasons as the head analyst and second assistant. Chiefy also previously worked under Graham Arnold and Steve Corica at Sydney FC. The first signing that he made was to sign Mohamed Al-Taay who he had coached at Blacktown City FC. He then went on only to make one more signing in the offseason which was goalkeeper Jack Duncan. He also loaned Costa Rican Youstin Salas from Deportivo Saprissa in the January transfer window. Many experts and social media influencers had the Phoenix towards the bottom of the table because of the new coach and the lack of signings. But in the 2023–24 A-League Men season Italiano coached the Phoenix to second place in the regular season, qualifying to the Semi-Finals for the first time. After a 0–0 draw in the first leg against Melbourne Victory at AAMI Park, the Phoenix lost 2–1 after extra time in front of a record crowd at Hnry Stadium in the second leg.

Ahead of the 2024–25 season, Oskar Zawada, Alex Paulsen, Ben Old, Bozhidar Kraev, and Finn Surman all left the club due to their contracts finishing or being transferred to another club. The club finished the season in 11th place out of 13 teams.

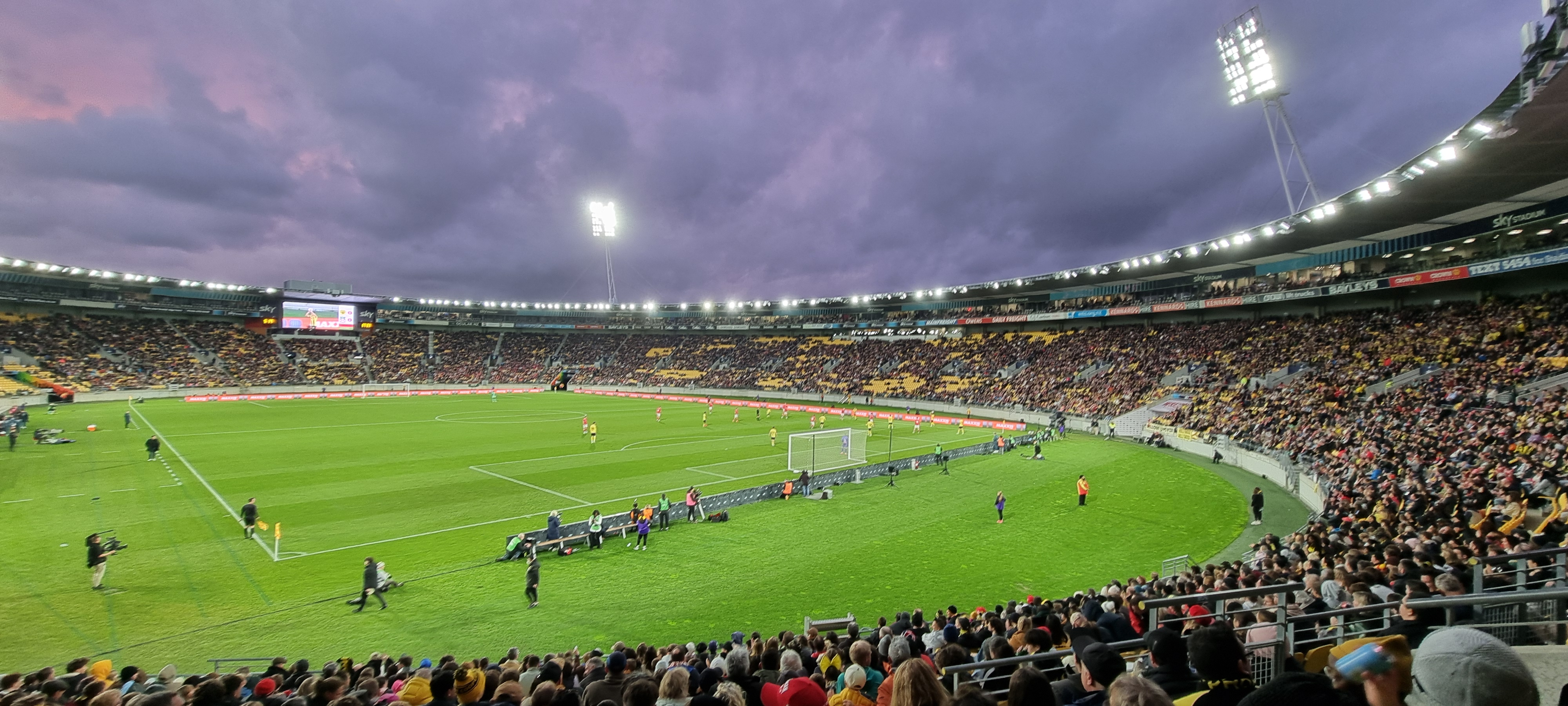
Match between the Phoenix and Welsh club Wrexham AFC in July 2025.

The Phoenix signed international recruits Ifeanyi Eze and Manjrekar James, as well as Australian Carlo Armiento in preparation for the 2025–26 season. The Phoenix won their three matches, but lost the first New Zealand Derby of the season to rivals Auckland FC. In February 2026, following a 5–0 at home to rivals Auckland FC (their sixth consecutive New Zealand Derby loss), Italiano resigned from his position as head coach with immediate effect.

=== Greenacre era ===
Following the departure of Italiano, Chris Greenacre was appointed on an interim basis on 23 February 2026. Since retiring as a player in 2012, Greenacre had been appointed interim head coach of the Phoenix on three prior occasions. At the time of his interim appointment, the club was second-last on the table, winless in five matches, and had just suffered the aforementioned heavy defeat against Auckland FC. Greenacre led the Phoenix to 13 points in the final 8 regular season rounds, the third highest points gathered during that timeframe. On 5 April, the Phoenix defeated Melbourne Victory 1–0 away from home, snapping a 9-year winless streak at AAMI Park. Following the improved end of season run under him, the Wellington Phoenix announced Greenacre had been appointed to a one-year head coach contract until the end of the 2026–27 season, with an option for a second year.

The start to the 2026–27 season represented the Wellington Phoenix’s best ever, recording three wins in the opening three rounds. The Wellington Phoenix also earned their first point against rivals Auckland FC with a 0–0 draw on 7 November 2026.

== Colours and badge ==
The original logo for the club used between from the club's inception up until August 2017

Wellington's traditional home kit – first used 2009–10

The general consensus among Phoenix fans was for a kit featuring yellow and black vertical stripes; however, this format did not comply with the A-League template required by Reebok when Phoenix was admitted into the League. Instead, players wore a predominantly black strip with yellow and white trim for the first two seasons. When Reebok lifted constraints on kit designs in 2009, Phoenix adopted yellow and black vertical stripes. The Phoenix kit is currently provided by Paladin after Adidas decided against renewing their contract with the club. The badge is a shield depicting a rising phoenix.

As of 2024, the team currently has separate front of kit sponsors for both home and away games; Oppo (home) and Entelar Group (away) being the principal sponsors. Other sponsors include: eToro and Chemist Warehouse (back of the shirt), Budget (shorts), and McDonald's (shirt sleeve)

In August 2017, the club unveiled a new badge removing the shield in place of a larger, simplified phoenix. The updated badge also featured the club's new motto of 'E Rere Te Keo', a rising call rooted in the Māori legend of Taniwha.

== Stadium ==
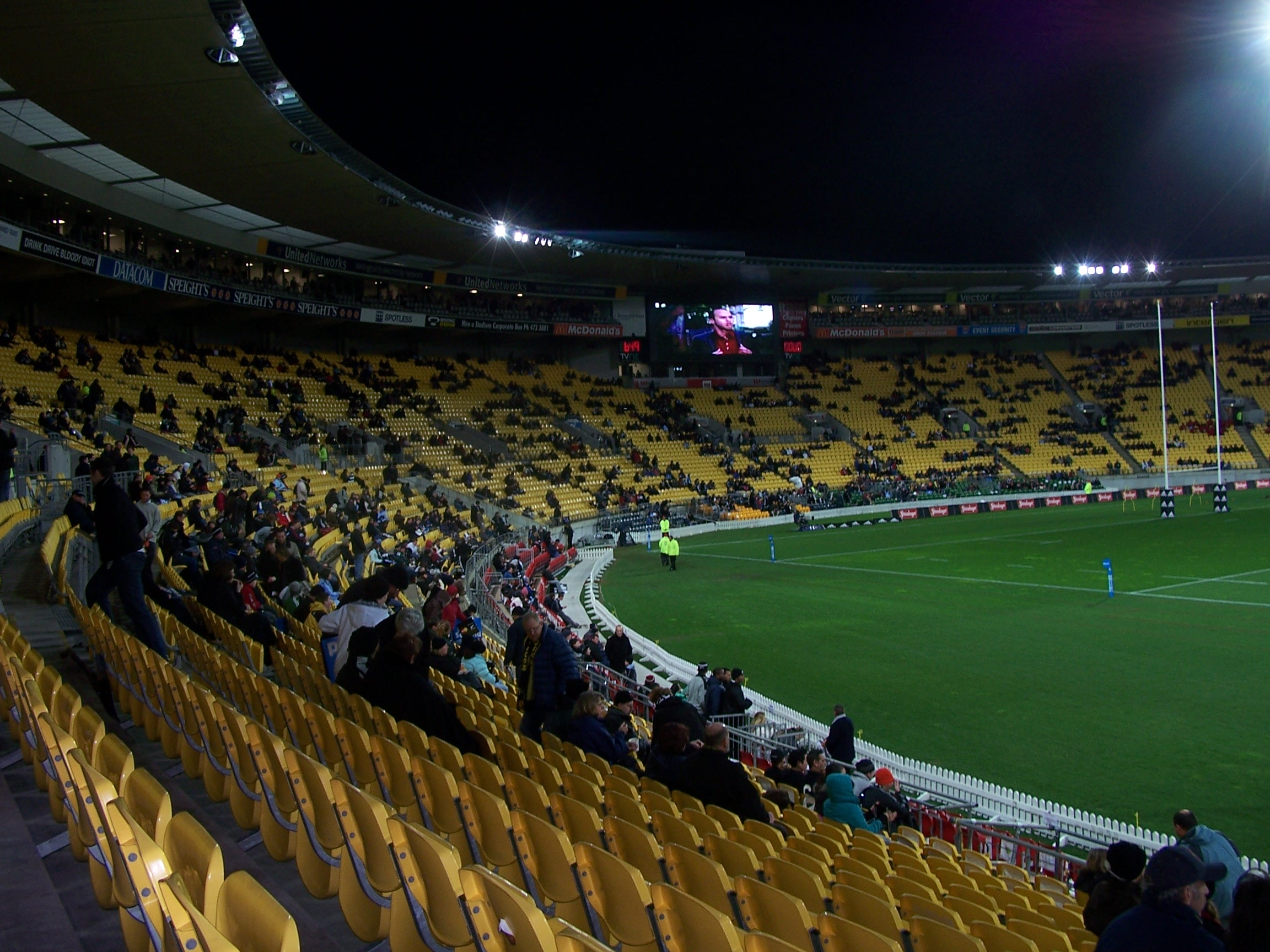
Hnry Stadium, home ground of Wellington Phoenix

Wellington Phoenix FC has played most of its home matches at the Wellington Regional Stadium (currently named Hnry Stadium for sponsorship reasons), which is referred to as the 'Ring of Fire' by fans. The stadium has a capacity of 34,500. The NZD$130 million stadium was built in 1999 by Fletcher Construction and is situated close to major transport facilities (such as Wellington railway station) one kilometre north of the central business district.

The stadium is owned and operated by Wellington Regional Stadium Trust. It is built on surplus-to-requirements reclaimed railway land on Wellington's waterfront.

Home fans sit in the southern and western areas of the stadium, while away fans sit to the north.

In the 2009–2010 A-League season, Wellington Phoenix FC played two home games away from Hnry Stadium, the first at Arena Manawatu in Palmerston North, the second at AMI Stadium in Christchurch. The two games were key to Wellington Phoenix expanding their fan base in New Zealand. This was followed by playing a game in Auckland at Eden Park in front of 20,078 attendees during the 2011–2012 A-League season.

The Phoenix previously trained at Newtown Park, on a ground that was specially redeveloped in 2008 and separate to the playing pitch. This ground was shared with NZFC franchise, Team Wellington however in 2017 the Phoenix moved to Martin Luckie Park which had been redeveloped with two full-sized sand-based pitches. Funding for the redevelopment came from the Phoenix as well as $550,000 given by Wellington City Council.

Due to COVID-19 in both New Zealand and Australia, the Wellington Phoenix-based themselves in Wollongong and played home games at WIN Stadium for the 2020–21 A-League season. Wellington returned to Wollongong for the 2021–22 A-League season and again played their home games at WIN Stadium.

== Players ==
=== First-team squad ===
As of 28 October 2026

Note: Flags indicate national team as defined under FIFA eligibility rules; some limited exceptions apply. Players may hold more than one non-FIFA nationality.

No.	Pos.	Nation	Player
5	DF	AUS	Walter Scott
6	MF	NZL	Fin Roa Conchie
7	MF	USA	Bryce Duke
8	MF	SCO	Max Anderson
9	FW	MEX	Rafael Durán
11	FW	NZL	Riley Bidois (on loan from Monterey Bay)
13	GK	NZL	Henry Gray (on loan from Ipswich Town)
14	MF	NZL	Alex Rufer (captain)
15	DF	NZL	Isaac Hughes
17	FW	NZL	Nathan Walker
18	DF	NZL	Lukas Kelly-Heald
23	DF	NZL	James McGarry

No.	Pos.	Nation	Player
24	DF	NZL	Xuan Loke
25	MF	JPN	Kazuki Nagasawa
27	DF	NZL	Matthew Sheridan
28	DF	NZL	Bill Tuiloma
30	GK	NZL	Alby Kelly-Heald
32	MF	NZL	Ben Trenberth (scholarship)
34	DF	NZL	Dylan Gardiner (scholarship)
35	MF	NZL	Luke Mitchell (scholarship)
37	MF	NZL	Anaru Cassidy (scholarship)
39	DF	NZL	Jayden Smith
40	GK	NZL	Eamonn McCarron
99	FW	NZL	Corban Piper

=== Youth ===
Players to have been featured in a first-team matchday squad for Wellington Phoenix

Note: Flags indicate national team as defined under FIFA eligibility rules; some limited exceptions apply. Players may hold more than one non-FIFA nationality.

No.	Pos.	Nation	Player

=== Reserves and youth academy ===
Wellington Phoenix's academy system was formed in 2013, absorbing the prolific Christchurch-based Asia-Pacific Football Academy. Since then, Wellington Phoenix have developed a number of notable players, including several New Zealand internationals.

The following players graduated from the Wellington Phoenix Football Academy, and have either represented their nation at international level or have played at a professional level outside New Zealand.

- (South Sudan) Manyumow Achol
- (United States) Tyler Boyd
- (Mexico) Eugenio Pizzuto
- (England) Calvin Harris
- (New Zealand) Sarpreet Singh
- (New Zealand) Liberato Cacace
- (New Zealand) Riley Bidois
- (New Zealand) James McGarry
- (New Zealand) Logan Rogerson
- (New Zealand) Joe Bell
- (New Zealand) Max Mata
- (New Zealand) Ben Old
- (New Zealand) Alex Rufer
- (New Zealand) Finn Surman
- (New Zealand) Oliver Whyte
- (New Zealand) Ben Waine
- (New Zealand) Alex Paulsen

== Club officials ==
=== Technical staff ===
As of 24 July 2026

Role	Name
Manager	(England) Chris Greenacre
Assistant manager	(New Zealand) Steve Coleman
Head analyst Second assistant coach	(New Zealand) Luke Tongue
Goalkeeping coach	(England) Paul Gothard
Operations manager	(New Zealand) Matthew Hastings
Head of Performance Science	(New Zealand) Weijie Lim
Head physiotherapist	(New Zealand) Grayson Harwood
Equipment manager	(New Zealand) Sebastian Bayliss
Rehab physiotherapist	(New Zealand) Jamie Hassett
Assistant analyst	(New Zealand) Tyron Curtis

=== Management ===
Updated 26 March 2019.

Position	Name
General Manager	David Dome
Director of Football	Shaun Gill
Operations manager	Matthew Hastings
Head of Media	Brenton Vannisselroy
Head of Brand Marketing	Emma Rogers
Head of Commercial	Tom Shaw
Academy Director	Emma Humphries

=== Captaincy history ===
Dates	Name	Honours (as captain)
2007–2008	(Australia) Ross Aloisi	Inaugural club captain
2008–2019	(New Zealand) Andrew Durante	Longest serving captain
2019–2020	(England) Steven Taylor	First captain from outside Australia and New Zealand.
2020–2021	(Mexico) Ulises Dávila	
2021	(England) Steven Taylor	Retired prior to the start of the 2021–22 season, a few days after being named captain.
2021–	(New Zealand) Alex Rufer	

=== Managers ===
As of 25 October 2026.

Key

- † Caretaker appointment
- ‡ Initial caretaker appointments promoted to full-time manager
- Manager dates, statistics and nationalities are sourced from WorldFootball.net and Ultimatealeague.com

List of Wellington Phoenix Managers
Name	Nationality	From	To	M	W	D	L	GF	GA	Win %	Ref.
Ricki Herbert	New Zealand	26 August 2007	24 February 2013	154	54	35	65	193	223	35.06	
Chris Greenacre †	England	27 February 2013	31 March 2013	5	2	0	3	7	8	40.00	
Ernie Merrick	Scotland	13 October 2013	4 December 2016	90	30	15	45	121	156	33.33	
Chris Greenacre †	England	10 December 2016	1 January 2017	4	1	3	0	7	4	25.00	
Des Buckingham ‡	England	10 December 2016	16 April 2017	19	6	6	7	35	32	31.58	
Darije Kalezić	Bosnia-Herzegovina	8 October 2017	23 February 2018	21	4	5	12	24	42	19.05	
Chris Greenacre †	England	10 March 2018	14 April 2018	6	1	1	4	7	13	16.67	
Marko Rudan	Australia	21 October 2018	3 May 2019	28	11	7	10	47	46	39.29	
Ufuk Talay	Australia	13 October 2019	6 May 2023	105	41	24	40	150	164	39.05	
Giancarlo Italiano (Note: This includes a two-match interim spell in the 2021–22 season during which head coach Ufuk Talay was ill with COVID-19.)	Australia	6 May 2023	21 February 2026	80	29	21	30	103	119	36.25	
Chris Greenacre ‡	England	23 February 2026	present	10	6	1	3	12	11	60.00	

== Supporters ==
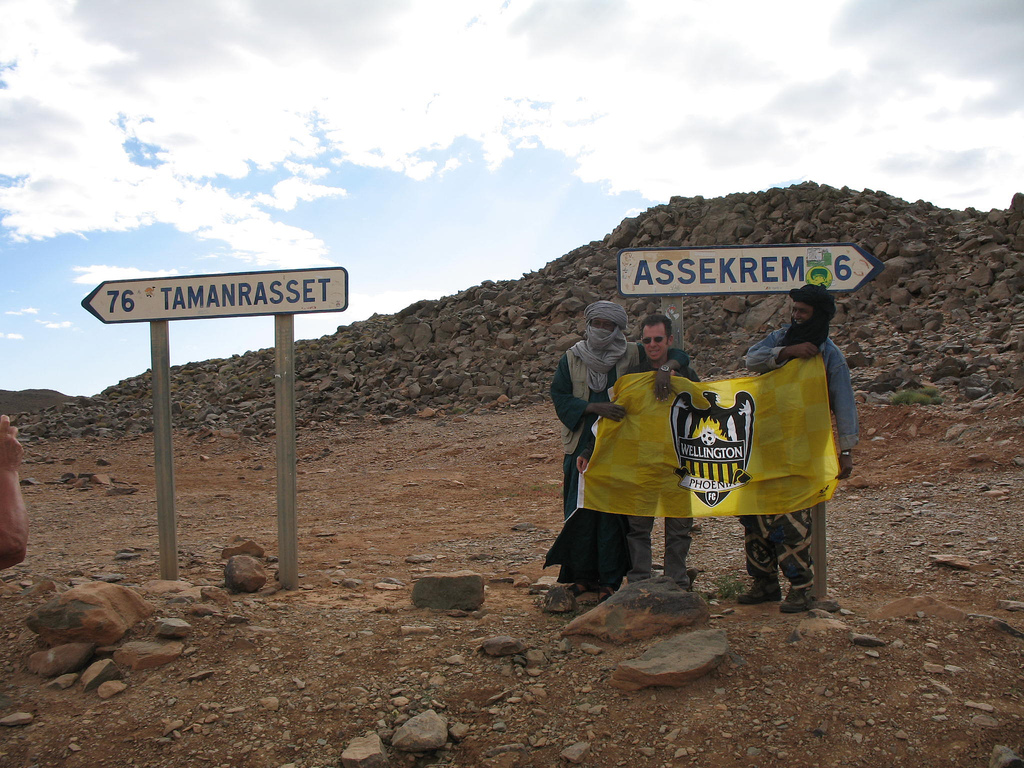
Phoenix fan in Algeria.

Wellington Phoenix has built a strong fan-base in Wellington, across New Zealand, and amongst New Zealanders in Australia. The main supporters' group, named the Yellow Fever, was founded a day after the Wellington Phoenix's formation was announced. Yellow Fever founder Mike Greene met with the founder of New Zealand cricket supporter group, the Beige Brigade, to get ideas of how to get the group started. The name was originally chosen on the assumption that the new Wellington-based team would play in a yellow playing strip (yellow being the dominant sporting colour of the region). Although the eventual strip was primarily black, the Yellow Fever elected to retain the name; many Yellow Fever members chose to wear yellow to fixtures as opposed to black. The 'Fever Zone' is located within aisles 21 and 22 of Hnry Stadium; although it is an all-seater facility, most Yellow Fever members choose to stand in front of their seat – similar to terrace seating traditions in British football.

The Yellow Fever are renowned within the A-League for their traditions; the most prominent of which being if the Phoenix are winning by the 80th minute, members remove their shirts. Additionally, prior to the last home game before Christmas, the Yellow Fever organise a pub crawl, entitled The 12 Pubs of Lochhead after defender Tony Lochhead.

Many Yellow Fever members have also lent their support to other football fixtures in Wellington and New Zealand, mostly notably Team Wellington of the ISPS Handa Premiership and the New Zealand national football team. Yellow Fever also lent its support to the New Zealand women's national under-17 football team during the 2008 FIFA U-17 Women's World Cup, held in New Zealand.

The former official podcast of Yellow Fever, 'Phoenix City', is hosted by Patrick Barnes, and features Cameron McIntosh and Andrew French as panellists. The weekly recording often includes a guest interview and covers the Wellington Phoenix, the All Whites and other national teams, New Zealanders playing overseas, the ISPS Handa Premiership, and local club football, including the Chatham Cup.

The Yellow Fever supporters share a strong relationship with the club due to their charity initiatives. Yellow Fever is the first supporters club in the A-League to organise and sponsor an annual footballing scholarship. The "Retro Ricki Youth Scholarship" was awarded annually to a promising young New Zealand footballer. Nominations for the scholarship were made by Yellow Fever members, and the recipient was chosen by the Yellow Fever executive and Wellington Phoenix staff. The recipient received a trial with the Phoenix, covering travel and accommodation costs. Although the initiative only lasted four seasons, the scholarship is widely credited with bringing New Zealand international Marco Rojas professional attention.

- 2007: Stefan Kousoulas, Otago United
- 2008: Daniel Findlay, Three Kings United
- 2009: Marco Rojas, Melville United
- 2010: Thomas Spragg, Auckland City FC, and Tristan Prattley, Otago United

Yellow Fever members have also combined charity campaigns with their support of the Phoenix, with supporters selling bandannas in the club colours every year as part of the youth-cancer charity CanTeen's "Bandana Day" fundraiser. Yellow Fever members have also notably participated in the Movember movement since 2007, leading to the club itself participating as of 2008, and other Australian A-League clubs following suit in 2009.

In 2010, Yellow Fever, The Dominion Post and local sportswear chain RYOS teamed up to release the "LifeFlight Shirt", a white T-shirt emblazoned with pictures of Phoenix players sent into the Dominion Post as part of a competition. 25% of the proceeds from the sale of these T-shirts were donated to the LifeFlight air ambulance service.

== Rivalries ==
One of the club’s rivals are fellow New Zealand side Auckland FC — also known as the "Black Knights", who were founded in 2024, with whom they contest the New Zealand Derby.

== Women's team ==
In June 2020, Wellington Phoenix announced their desire in creating a women's team before the 2023 FIFA Women's World Cup as part of a A-League Women plan of adding three expansion clubs by the said period and in September 2021, they announced the newly created team would be joining the A-League as an expansion starting with the 2021–22 season. This made the Phoenix the first women's professional football team from New Zealand.

== Honours ==
=== League ===
- A-League Men Premiership
  - Runners-up (1): 2023–24

=== Cup ===
- A-League Pre-Season Challenge Cup
  - Runners-up (1): 2008
- NE Lajong Super Series Championship
  - Runners-up (1): 2012

== End-of-season awards ==
Season	Player of the Year	Members' Player of the Year	Players' Player of the Year	Media Player of the Year	Under-23 Player of the Year	Golden Boot	Lloyd Morrison Spirit of the Phoenix Award
2007–08	(New Zealand) Shane Smeltz	(New Zealand) Shane Smeltz	(New Zealand) Shane Smeltz	(New Zealand) Shane Smeltz	not awarded	(New Zealand) Shane Smeltz	not yet established
2008–09	(New Zealand) Leo Bertos	(New Zealand) Ben Sigmund	(New Zealand) Shane Smeltz	(New Zealand) Shane Smeltz	not awarded	(New Zealand) Shane Smeltz	not yet established
2009–10	(Australia) Andrew Durante	(Barbados) Paul Ifill	(Barbados) Paul Ifill	(Barbados) Paul Ifill	(Australia) Troy Hearfield	(Barbados) Paul Ifill	not yet established
2010–11	(New Zealand) Ben Sigmund	(Malta) Manny Muscat	(Malta) Manny Muscat	(New Zealand) Marco Rojas	(New Zealand) Marco Rojas	(England) Chris Greenacre	not yet established
2011–12	(New Zealand) Ben Sigmund	(New Zealand) Ben Sigmund	(New Zealand) Ben Sigmund	(New Zealand) Ben Sigmund	not awarded	(Barbados) Paul Ifill	not yet established
2012–13	(New Zealand) Andrew Durante	Since 2012–13, members vote for the U–23 player of the year	(New Zealand) Jeremy Brockie	not awarded	(New Zealand) Louis Fenton	(New Zealand) Jeremy Brockie	(New Zealand) Ben Sigmund
2013–14	(Spain) Albert Riera	Since 2012–13, members vote for the U–23 player of the year	(Australia) Vince Lia	not awarded	(New Zealand) Tyler Boyd	(Belgium) Stein Huysegems	(New Zealand) Leo Bertos (Belgium) Stein Huysegems
2014–15	(Australia) Nathan Burns	Since 2012–13, members vote for the U–23 player of the year	(Australia) Nathan Burns	not awarded	(Netherlands) Roly Bonevacia	(Australia) Nathan Burns	(New Zealand) Rob Lee (Scotland) Lee Spence
2015–16	(New Zealand) Glen Moss	Since 2012–13, members vote for the U–23 player of the year	(New Zealand) Glen Moss	not awarded	(Australia) Dylan Fox	(Australia) Blake Powell	not awarded
2016–17	(New Zealand) Kosta Barbarouses	Since 2012–13, members vote for the U–23 player of the year	(Fiji) Roy Krishna	not awarded	(Australia) Jacob Tratt	(Fiji) Roy Krishna	not awarded
2017–18	(Fiji) Roy Krishna	Since 2012–13, members vote for the U–23 player of the year	(Australia) Dylan Fox	not awarded	(New Zealand) Matthew Ridenton	(Serbia) Andrija Kaluđerović	(England) Chris Greenacre
2018–19	(Fiji) Roy Krishna	Since 2012–13, members vote for the U–23 player of the year	(Fiji) Roy Krishna	not awarded	(New Zealand) Liberato Cacace	(Fiji) Roy Krishna	(New Zealand) Alex Rufer
2019–20	(England) David Ball	(New Zealand) Liberato Cacace	(New Zealand) Liberato Cacace	(New Zealand) Liberato Cacace	(New Zealand) Liberato Cacace	(Mexico) Ulises Dávila	(New Zealand) Wellington Phoenix
2020–21	(Mexico) Ulises Dávila	(New Zealand) Oli Sail	(Mexico) Ulises Dávila	(Mexico) Ulises Dávila	(New Zealand) Ben Waine	(Israel) Tomer Hemed	not awarded
2021–22	(New Zealand) Oli Sail	(England) David Ball	(New Zealand) Oli Sail	(New Zealand) Oli Sail	(New Zealand) Sam Sutton	(Australia) Jaushua Sotirio (New Zealand) Ben Waine	not awarded
2022–23	(Poland) Oskar Zawada	(Poland) Oskar Zawada	(Poland) Oskar Zawada	(Poland) Oskar Zawada	(New Zealand) Callan Elliot	(Poland) Oskar Zawada	(New Zealand) Lily Alfeld
2023-24	(New Zealand) Kosta Barbarouses	(New Zealand) Alex Paulsen	(New Zealand) Alex Paulsen	(New Zealand) Kosta Barbarouses	(New Zealand) Alex Paulsen	(New Zealand) Kosta Barbarouses	(New Zealand) David Dome
2024–25	(New Zealand) Kosta Barbarouses				(New Zealand) Corban Piper	(New Zealand) Kosta Barbarouses	(New Zealand) Annalie Longo
2025–26	(New Zealand) Alex Rufer (Nigeria) Ifeanyi Eze	(Nigeria) Ifeanyi Eze	(New Zealand) Alex Rufer	(Nigeria) Ifeanyi Eze	(New Zealand) Isaac Hughes	(Nigeria) Ifeanyi Eze	(New Zealand) Mackenzie Barry

== Records and statistics ==
=== Player ===
- Most League appearances: 273, (New Zealand) Andrew Durante
- Most appearances in a single season: 31, (England) Chris Greenacre, 2010–11
- All-time leading goalscorer: 51, (Fiji) Roy Krishna
- Most goals in a season: 18, (Fiji) Roy Krishna, 2018–19 (26 appearances)

=== Team ===
- First League match: v Melbourne Victory, 26 August 2007 (drew 2–2)
- First goalscorer: Daniel v Melbourne Victory, 26 August 2007
- First win: v. Sydney FC, 14 September 2007 (won 2–1)
- Biggest victory:
  - 6–0 v Gold Coast United, 25 October 2009
  - 8–2 v Central Coast Mariners, 9 March 2019
- Biggest defeat:
  - 7–1 v Sydney FC, 19 January 2013
  - 6–0 v Melbourne City, 2 April 2022
- Most wins in a row: 5 matches; 30 January 2010 – 7 March 2010
- Most losses in a row: 9 matches; 20 March 2016 – 31 October 2016
- Highest home attendance: 33,297 v Melbourne Victory on 18 May 2024
- Highest regular season attendance: 26,252 v Auckland FC at Hnry Stadium, Wellington on 2 November 2024
- Highest friendly attendance: 31,853 v Los Angeles Galaxy on 1 December 2007
- Highest average attendance in a season: 11,683 – 2007–08 season
- Lowest home attendance (at WIN Stadium during the COVID-19 era): 586 v Western United, A-League Men, 21 January 2022
- Lowest home attendance (in Wellington): 3,030 v Newcastle Jets, A-League Men, 14 December 2025

== Season-by-season record ==
Season	Division	League										AUS Cup	Top scorer	
Season	Division	P	W	D	L	F	A	GD	Pts	Pos	Finals	AUS Cup	Name	Goals
2007–08	A-League	21	5	5	11	25	37	–12	20	8th	–	–	(New Zealand) Shane Smeltz	9
2008–09	A-League	21	7	5	9	23	31	–9	26	6th	–	–	(New Zealand) Shane Smeltz ♦	12
2009–10	A-League	27	10	10	7	37	29	+8	40	4th	3rd	–	(Barbados) Paul Ifill	13
2010–11	A-League	30	12	5	13	39	41	–2	41	6th	SF	–	(England) Chris Greenacre	8
2011–12	A-League	27	12	4	11	34	32	+2	40	4th	SF	–	(Barbados) Paul Ifill	8
2012–13	A-League	27	7	6	14	31	49	–18	28	10th	–	–	(New Zealand) Jeremy Brockie	16
2013–14	A-League	27	7	7	13	36	42	–6	28	9th	–	–	(Belgium) Stein Huysegems	10
2014–15	A-League	27	14	4	9	45	35	+10	46	4th	EF	R32	(Australia) Nathan Burns	13
2015–16	A-League	27	7	4	16	34	54	–20	25	9th	–	R16	(Australia) Blake Powell	8
2016–17	A-League	27	8	6	13	41	46	–5	30	7th	–	R32	(Fiji) Roy Krishna	12
2017–18	A-League	27	5	6	16	31	55	–24	21	9th	–	R32	(Serbia) Andrija Kaluđerović	9
2018–19	A-League	27	11	7	9	46	43	+3	40	6th	EF	R32	(Fiji) Roy Krishna ♦	19
2019–20	A-League	26	12	5	9	38	33	+5	41	3rd	EF	R32	(Mexico) Ulises Dávila	12
2020–21	A-League	26	10	8	8	44	34	+10	38	7th	–	–	(Israel) Tomer Hemed	11
2021–22	A-League Men	26	12	3	11	34	49	–15	39	6th	EF	SF	(Australia) Jaushua Sotirio (New Zealand) Ben Waine	8
2022–23	A-League Men	26	9	8	9	39	45	–6	32	6th	EF	QF	(Poland) Oskar Zawada	15
2023–24	A-League Men	27	15	8	4	42	26	+16	53	2nd	SF	R16	(New Zealand) Kosta Barbarouses	13
2024–25	A-League Men	26	6	6	14	27	43	−16	24	11th	–	R32	(New Zealand) Kosta Barbarouses	11
2025–26	A-League Men	26	9	6	11	36	48	−12	33	8th	–	QF	(Nigeria) Ifeanyi Eze	10

Chart of yearly table positions for Wellington Phoenix in A-League Men

	Champions
	Runners-up
	Third place
	Last place
	Did not make the playoff
♦	Top scorer in competition
PO	Playoff
GS	Group stage
EF	Elimination finals
R32	Round of 32
R16	Round of 16
QF	Quarter-finals
SF	Semi-finals

== See also ==
- Football Kingz FC
- Phoenix (sports team), a list of sports teams named after the mythological phoenix or Phoenix, Arizona
