= 2025–26 Western Sydney Wanderers FC season =

Western Sydney Wanderers
2025–26 season
- Chairman: Paul Lederer
- Manager: Alen Stajcic (to 20 January 2026); Gary van Egmond (from 21 January 2026)
- Stadium: CommBank Stadium
- A-League Men: 12th
- A-League Men Finals: DNQ
- Australia Cup: Round of 16
- Top goalscorer: League: Bozhidar Kraev (5); All: Bozhidar Kraev (7)
- Highest home attendance: 21,258 vs. Sydney FC (29 November 2025); A-League Men
- Lowest home attendance: 4,461 vs. Wellington Phoenix (14 February 2026); A-League Men
- Average home league attendance: 8,043
- Biggest win: 3–0 vs. Peninsula Power (A) (22 July 2025); Australia Cup
- Biggest defeat: 0–3 vs. Heidelberg United (A) (12 August 2025); Australia Cup; 1–4; Sydney FC (A) (31 January 2026); A-League Men
- All statistics correct as of 25 April 2026.

The 2025–26 season was the 14th in the history of Western Sydney Wanderers FC. In addition to the domestic league, Western Sydney Wanderers participated in the Australia Cup.

== Players ==
=== First-team squad ===
Note: Flags indicate national team as defined under FIFA eligibility rules; some limited exceptions apply. Players may hold more than one non-FIFA nationality.

No.	Pos.	Nation	Player
3	DF	AUS	Alex Gersbach
5	MF	AUS	Dylan Scicluna
7	FW	SCO	Ryan Fraser
8	MF	AUS	Steven Ugarkovic
9	FW	NZL	Kosta Barbarouses
11	FW	JPN	Hiroshi Ibusuki
14	DF	AUS	Phillip Cancar
17	MF	AUS	Jarrod Carluccio
18	DF	AUS	Jacob Farrell (on loan from Portsmouth)
19	DF	AUS	Ruon Tongyik
20	GK	AUS	Lawrence Thomas (captain)
21	FW	AUS	Aydan Hammond (scholarship)
22	DF	AUS	Anthony Pantazopoulos

No.	Pos.	Nation	Player
23	MF	BUL	Bozhidar Kraev
24	DF	AUS	Nathan Barrie (scholarship)
25	MF	AUS	Joshua Brillante
26	FW	AUS	Brandon Borrello
30	GK	AUS	Jordan Holmes
31	DF	AUS	Aidan Simmons
32	MF	AUS	Angus Thurgate
34	DF	AUS	Ricky Fransen (scholarship)
36	DF	AUS	Ben Mewett (scholarship)
37	FW	AUS	Alaat Abdul-Rahman (scholarship)
38	FW	AUS	Jai Rose (scholarship)
39	FW	AUS	Awan Lual (scholarship)
45	FW	AUS	Alou Kuol

== Transfers ==
=== Transfers in ===
No.	Position	Player	Transferred from	Type/fee	Contract length	Date	Ref
10	FW	Alexander Badolato	Melbourne Victory	End of loan	(1 year)	30 June 2025	
9	FW	(New Zealand) Kosta Barbarouses	Wellington Phoenix	Free transfer	1 year	1 July 2025	
8	MF	Steven Ugarkovic	Melbourne City	Free transfer	2 years	1 July 2025	
14	DF	Phillip Cancar	Newcastle Jets	Free transfer	1 year	1 July 2025	
45	FW	Alou Kuol	Central Coast Mariners	Free transfer	1 year	1 July 2025	
11	FW	Marcus Younis	(Netherlands) Jong PSV	End of loan	(2 years)	1 July 2025	
36	DF	Ben Mewett	Central Coast Mariners Academy	Free transfer	2 year scholarship	13 July 2025	
19	DF	Ruon Tongyik	Unattached	Free transfer	1 year	11 August 2025	
32	MF	Angus Thurgate	Unattached	Free transfer	3 years	14 September 2025	
11	FW	(Japan) Hiroshi Ibusuki	(India) East Bengal	Free transfer	1.5 years	16 January 2026	
7	FW	(Scotland) Ryan Fraser	(England) Southampton	Undisclosed	6 months	23 January 2026	
18	DF	Jacob Farrell	(England) Portsmouth	Loan	5 months	7 February 2026	

==== From youth squad ====
No.	Position	Player	Age	Notes	Ref
37	FW	Alaat Abdul-Rahman	18	2-year scholarship contract	
34	DF	Ricky Fransen	18	2-year scholarship contract	
39	FW	Awan Lual	19	3-year scholarship contract	
38	FW	Jai Rose	18	2-year scholarship contract	

=== Transfers out ===
No.	Position	Player	Transferred to	Type/fee	Date	Ref
14	FW	Nicolas Milanovic	(Scotland) Aberdeen	Undisclosed	15 May 2025	
13	MF	Dean Pelekanos	(Malaysia) Sabah	End of contract	15 June 2025	
7	FW	Zac Sapsford	(Scotland) Dundee United	Undisclosed	10 June 2025	
1	GK	Taiga Harper	Unattached	End of contract	30 June 2025	
8	DK	(South Korea) Jeong Tae-wook	(South Korea) Jeonbuk Hyundai Motors	End of loan	30 June 2025	
9	FW	(Sweden) Marcus Antonsson	(Sweden) IFK Värnamo	End of contract	30 June 2025	
10	FW	Alexander Badolato	Newcastle Jets	Mutual contract termination	30 June 2025	
19	DF	Jack Clisby	Unattached	End of contract	30 June 2025	
27	FW	James Temelkovski	(Hong Kong) Tai Po	End of contract	30 June 2025	
64	MF	(Spain) Juan Mata	Unattached	End of contract	30 June 2025	
11	FW	Marcus Younis	(Denmark) Brøndby	Undisclosed	22 August 2025	
18	MF	Oscar Priestman	(Scotland) Motherwell	Undisclosed	26 August 2025	
6	MF	(Iraq) Mohamed Al-Taay	(Iraq) Al-Karma	Mutual contract termination	4 January 2026	
4	DF	Alex Bonetig	(United States) Portland Timbers	Undisclosed	8 January 2026	
2	DF	Gabriel Cleur	Retired		12 January 2026	

=== Contract extensions ===
No.	Player	Position	Duration	Date	Notes	Ref.
2	Gabriel Cleur	Right-back	1 year	2 June 2025		
30	Jordan Holmes	Goalkeeper	2 years	4 June 2025		
25	Joshua Brillante	Defensive midfielder	1 year	21 July 2025	Contract extension triggered	

== Pre-season and friendlies ==
Win Draw Loss

2 August 2025	Persib Bandung (Indonesia)	1–0	(Australia) Western Sydney Wanderers	Bandung, Indonesia
	Wiliam 60'	Report		Stadium: GBLA Stadium; Attendance: 14,633; Referee: Thoriq Alkatiri (Indonesia)

19 August 2025	Western Sydney Wanderers (Australia)	1–1	(Australia) Newcastle Jets	Sydney, Australia
	Barbarouses	Report	Fryer	Stadium: Wanderers Football Park; Attendance: 0 (behind closed doors)

27 August 2025	Western Sydney Wanderers (Australia)	3–1	(Australia) Blacktown Spartans	Sydney, Australia
19:00 AEST	Barbarouses 2', 33'; Lual 89'	Report	40'	Stadium: Wanderers Football Park

20 September 2025	Western Sydney Wanderers (Australia)	1–1	(Australia) Central Coast Mariners	Sydney, Australia
	Borrello 30' (pen.)	Report	De Lima 88'	Stadium: Wanderers Football Park; Attendance: 0 (behind closed doors)

4 October 2025	Western Sydney Wanderers (Australia)	1–1	(New Zealand) Wellington Phoenix	Australia
	Goal	Report	Hughes

10 October 2025	Western Sydney Wanderers (Australia)	2–1	(Australia) Perth Glory	Sydney
8:00 AWST	Hammond; Barbarouses	Report	Wales	Stadium: Wanderers Football Park; Attendance: 0 (behind closed doors)

== Competitions ==
=== Overall record ===
Competition	First match	Last match	Starting round	Final position	Record							
Competition	First match	Last match	Starting round	Final position	Pld	W	D	L	GF	GA	GD	Win %
A League Men	18 October 2025	25 April 2026	Matchday 1	12th	26	5	6	15	27	43	−16	19.23
Australia Cup	22 July 2025	12 August 2025	Round of 32	Round of 16	2	1	0	1	3	3	+0	50.00
Total					28	6	6	16	30	46	−16	21.43

Last updated: 25 April 2026
Source: Competitions

=== A-League Men ===
==== League table ====
Pos	Team	Pld	W	D	L	GF	GA	GD	Pts
8	Wellington Phoenix (Note: Auckland FC and Wellington Phoenix cannot qualify for Asian Football Confederation competitions as they are based in New Zealand, which is part of the Oceania Football Confederation.)	26	9	6	11	36	48	−12	33
9	Central Coast Mariners	26	8	8	10	35	42	−7	32
10	Perth Glory	26	8	7	11	32	39	−7	31
11	Brisbane Roar	26	6	8	12	27	36	−9	26
12	Western Sydney Wanderers	26	5	6	15	27	43	−16	21

Source: A-Leagues
Rules for classification: 1) points; 2) goal difference; 3) goals scored; 4) wins; 5) head-to-head results; 5a) head-to-head points; 5b) head-to-head goal difference; 6) Fair Play points; 7) away goal difference; 8) away goals per match; 9) home goal difference; 10) home goals per match; 11) toss of a coin in an event of a tie of two clubs.

==== Results summary ====
Overall								Home						Away					
Pld	W	D	L	GF	GA	GD	Pts	W	D	L	GF	GA	GD	W	D	L	GF	GA	GD
26	5	6	15	27	43	−16	21	3	4	6	12	19	−7	2	2	9	15	24	−9

Last updated: 25 April 2026.
Source: Ultimate A-League

==== Results by round ====
Round	1	2	3	4	5	6	7	8	9	10	11	12	13	14	15	16	17	18	19	20	21	22	23	24	25	26
Ground	H	A	A	A	H	H	A	H	H	A	H	A	H	H	A	H	H	A	A	A	A	H	A	H	A	H
Result	D	L	D	L	W	W	L	D	L	L	L	W	L	W	L	D	D	L	W	L	D	L	L	L	L	L
Position	7	10	11	11	9	8	9	7	11	11	12	11	12	11	12	12	12	12	11	12	12	12	12	12	12	12
Points	1	1	2	2	5	8	8	9	9	9	9	12	12	15	15	16	17	17	20	20	21	21	21	21	21	21

Updated to match(es) played on 25 April 2026. Source: Ultimate A-League
A = Away; H = Home; W = Win; D = Draw; L = Loss

==== Matches ====
Win Draw Loss Fixtures

18 October 2025 1	Western Sydney Wanderers	1–1	Melbourne City	Sydney
17:00 AEDT	Barbarouses 11'	Report	Caputo 13'	Stadium: CommBank Stadium; Attendance: 9,205; Referee: Alex King

25 October 2025 2	Auckland FC	1–0	Western Sydney Wanderers	Auckland
17:00 NZDT	Randall 21'	Report		Stadium: Go Media Stadium; Attendance: 14,767; Referee: Tim Danaskos

1 November 2025 3	Macarthur FC	1–1	Western Sydney Wanderers	Sydney
19:35 AEDT	Sawyer 2'	Report	Pantazopoulos 82'	Stadium: Campbelltown Stadium; Attendance: 7,605; Referee: Alireza Faghani

7 November 2025 4	Adelaide United	2–0	Western Sydney Wanderers	Adelaide
19:05 ACDT	Jovanovic 63'; Goodwin 68'	Report		Stadium: Coopers Stadium; Attendance: 9,916; Referee: Lachlan Keevers

22 November 2025 5	Western Sydney Wanderers	3–2	Central Coast Mariners	Sydney
17:00 AEDT	Kraev 1'; Barbarouses 11', 23' (pen.)	Report	Mauragis 9'; McCalmont 39' (pen.)	Stadium: CommBank Stadium; Attendance: 6,557; Referee: Daniel Elder

29 November 2025 6	Western Sydney Wanderers	1–0	Sydney FC	Sydney
19:35 AEDT	Kuol 21'	Report		Stadium: CommBank Stadium; Attendance: 21,258; Referee: Alex King

5 December 2025 7	Perth Glory	1–0	Western Sydney Wanderers	Perth
18:45 AWST	Despotovski 30'	Report		Stadium: HBF Park; Attendance: 5,590; Referee: Shane Skinner

13 December 2025 8	Western Sydney Wanderers	0–0	Brisbane Roar	Sydney
17:00 AEDT		Report		Stadium: CommBank Stadium; Attendance: 4,652; Referee: Adam Kersey

19 December 2025 9	Western Sydney Wanderers	0–2	Auckland FC	Sydney
20:00 AEDT		Report	Randall 57'; Brook 74'	Stadium: CommBank Stadium; Attendance: 5,029; Referee: Alex King
Note: The match was originally scheduled for 19:35, but was delayed to 20:00 due to adverse weather conditions.

27 December 2025 10	Adelaide United	3–2	Western Sydney Wanderers	Adelaide
19:05 ACDT	Jovanovic 31'; Ayoubi 67'; Yull 90+3'	Report	Hammond 55'; Borrello 71' (pen.)	Stadium: Coopers Stadium; Attendance: 13,582; Referee: Daniel Elder

1 January 2026 11	Western Sydney Wanderers	0–1	Macarthur FC	Sydney
19:00 AEDT		Report	Durán 41'	Stadium: CommBank Stadium; Attendance: 8,048; Referee: Jonathan Barreiro

10 January 2026 12	Melbourne Victory	0–1	Western Sydney Wanderers	Melbourne
17:00 AEDT		Report	Barbarouses 29' (pen.)	Stadium: AAMI Park; Attendance: 12,502; Referee: Daniel Elder

17 January 2026 13	Western Sydney Wanderers	1–2	Newcastle Jets	Sydney
17:00 AEDT	Lual 83'	Report	Shaughnessy 15'; Adams 38'	Stadium: CommBank Stadium; Attendance: 5,243; Referee: Alireza Faghani

25 January 2026 14	Western Sydney Wanderers	1–0	Perth Glory	Sydney
17:00 AEDT	Fraser 90+2'	Report		Stadium: CommBank Stadium; Attendance: 5,178; Referee: Ben Abraham

31 January 2026 15	Sydney FC	4–1	Western Sydney Wanderers	Sydney
19:35 AEDT	Campuzano 10'; Tisserand 49'; Quintal 55', 68'	Report	Fraser 1'	Stadium: Allianz Stadium; Attendance: 33,265; Referee: Adam Kersey

7 February 2026 16	Western Sydney Wanderers	1–1	Melbourne City	Sydney
19:35 AEDT	Kraev 77'	Report	Behich 65'	Stadium: CommBank Stadium; Attendance: 5,081; Referee: Eric Saba

13 February 2026 17	Western Sydney Wanderers	2–2	Wellington Phoenix	Sydney
19:35 AEST	Fraser 17'; Cancar 43'	Report	Tuiloma 68'; Eze 71'	Stadium: CommBank Stadium; Attendance: 4,461; Referee: Adam Kersey

22 February 2026 18	Central Coast Mariners	3–2	Western Sydney Wanderers	Gosford
17:00 AEDT	Auglah 55'; Blair 77'; Donachie 89'	Report	Thurgate 8'; Ibusuki 69'	Stadium: Polytec Stadium; Attendance: 4,506; Referee: Shane Skinner

28 February 2026 19	Macarthur FC	0–4	Western Sydney Wanderers	Sydney
19:35 AEDT		Report	Ugarkovic 6'; Kraev 24'; Fraser 43'; Borrello 70'	Stadium: Campbelltown Stadium; Attendance: 5,321; Referee: Daniel Elder

7 March 2026 20	Newcastle Jets	2–1	Western Sydney Wanderers	Newcastle
17:00 AEDT	Adams 47'; Natta 77'	Report	Kraev 20'	Stadium: McDonald Jones Stadium; Attendance: 10,995; Referee: Adam Kersey

13 March 2026 21	Brisbane Roar	2–2	Western Sydney Wanderers	Brisbane
18:00 AEST	Vrakas 5'; Thom 74'	Report	Borrello 35'; Kraev 45+4'	Stadium: Suncorp Stadium; Attendance: 4,769; Referee: Sam Kelly

20 March 2026 22	Western Sydney Wanderers	2–4	Adelaide United	Sydney
19:35 AEDT	Gersbach 9'; Thurgate 55'	Report	Jovanovic 22', 63'; Muñiz 45+1'; Kikianis 71'	Stadium: CommBank Stadium; Attendance: 6,281; Referee: Lachlan Keevers

4 April 2026 23	Melbourne City	3–0	Western Sydney Wanderers	Melbourne
19:35 AEDT	Kuen 23'; Younis 33'; Rashani 49'	Report		Stadium: AAMI Park; Attendance: 4,458; Referee: Lachlan Keevers

11 April 2026 24	Western Sydney Wanderers	0–2	Sydney FC	Sydney
19:35 AEST		Report	Toure 20'; Stamatelopoulos 83'	Stadium: CommBank Stadium; Attendance: 16,135; Referee: Daniel Elder

18 April 2026 25	Wellington Phoenix	2–1	Western Sydney Wanderers	Christchurch
17:00 NZDT	Eze 16'; Nagasawa 56'	Report	Borrello 41'	Stadium: Apollo Projects Stadium; Attendance: 11,066; Referee: Benjamin Abraham

25 April 2026 26	Western Sydney Wanderers	0–2	Melbourne Victory	Sydney
17:00 AEST		Report	Santos 71'; Vergos 90+2'	Stadium: CommBank Stadium; Attendance: 7,437; Referee: Daniel Elder

=== Australia Cup ===
Win Draw Loss

22 July 2025 Round of 32	Peninsula Power	0–3	Western Sydney Wanderers	Brisbane
19:30 AEST		Report	Kraev 8', 23'; Barbarouses 32'	Stadium: A.J. Kelly Park; Attendance: 1,839; Referee: Jack Powers

12 August 2025 Round of 16	Heidelberg United	3–0	Western Sydney Wanderers	Melbourne
19:30 AEST	Juach 13', 31'; Lesiotis 90+1'	Report		Stadium: Olympic Park; Attendance: 1,103; Referee: Zijad Ahmetovic

== Statistics ==
=== Appearances and goals ===
Includes all competitions. Players with no appearances not included in the list.

As of 25 April 2026

No.	Pos	Nat	Player	Total		A-League Men		Australia Cup	
No.	Pos	Nat	Player	Apps	Goals	Apps	Goals	Apps	Goals
Goalkeepers
20	GK	(Australia) AUS	Lawrence Thomas	26	0	24	0	2	0
30	GK	(Australia) AUS	Jordan Holmes	2	0	2	0	0	0
Defenders
3	DF	(Australia) AUS	Alex Gersbach	24	1	20+2	1	2	0
14	DF	(Australia) AUS	Phillip Cancar	11	1	9+2	1	0	0
18	DF	(Australia) AUS	Jacob Farrell	7	0	6+1	0	0	0
19	DF	(Australia) AUS	Ruon Tongyik	11	0	6+4	0	0+1	0
22	DF	(Australia) AUS	Anthony Pantazopoulos	28	1	25+1	1	2	0
24	DF	(Australia) AUS	Nathan Barrie	7	0	2+4	0	0+1	0
31	DF	(Australia) AUS	Aidan Simmons	14	0	12	0	0+2	0
Midfielders
5	MF	(Australia) AUS	Dylan Scicluna	24	0	13+11	0	0	0
8	MF	(Australia) AUS	Steven Ugarkovic	26	1	18+6	1	1+1	0
17	MF	(Australia) AUS	Jarrod Carluccio	20	0	6+12	0	0+2	0
23	MF	(Bulgaria) BUL	Bozhidar Kraev	27	7	22+3	5	2	2
25	MF	(Australia) AUS	Josh Brillante	26	0	17+7	0	2	0
32	MF	(Australia) AUS	Angus Thurgate	26	2	26	2	0	0
Forwards
7	FW	(Scotland) SCO	Ryan Fraser	12	4	10+2	4	0	0
9	FW	(New Zealand) NZL	Kosta Barbarouses	24	5	16+6	4	2	1
11	FW	(Japan) JPN	Hiroshi Ibusuki	8	1	0+8	1	0	0
21	FW	(Australia) AUS	Aydan Hammond	21	1	7+12	1	2	0
26	FW	(Australia) AUS	Brandon Borrello	22	4	19+3	4	0	0
37	FW	(Australia) AUS	Alaat Abdul-Rahman	2	0	0+2	0	0	0
38	FW	(Australia) AUS	Jai Rose	9	0	4+5	0	0	0
39	FW	(Australia) AUS	Awan Lual	12	1	0+12	1	0	0
45	FW	(Australia) AUS	Alou Kuol	16	1	9+5	1	2	0
52	FW	(Australia) AUS	Atiya Waraga	3	0	1+2	0	0	0
Player(s) transferred out but featured this season
2	DF	(Australia) AUS	Gabriel Cleur	9	0	1+6	0	2	0
4	DF	(Australia) AUS	Alex Bonetig	13	0	11	0	2	0
6	MF	(Iraq) IRQ	Mohamed Al-Taay	2	0	0+1	0	0+1	0
11	FW	(Australia) AUS	Marcus Younis	2	0	0	0	0+2	0
18	MF	(Australia) AUS	Oscar Priestman	1	0	0	0	1	0

=== Disciplinary record ===
Includes all competitions. The list is sorted by squad number when total cards are equal. Players with no cards not included in the list.

As of 25 April 2026

Rank	No.	Pos.	Nat.	Name	A-League Men			Australia Cup			Total		
Rank	No.	Pos.	Nat.	Name	Booked	(yellow card) (yellow-red card)	Sent off (straight red)	Booked	(yellow card) (yellow-red card)	Sent off (straight red)	Booked	(yellow card) (yellow-red card)	Sent off (straight red)
1	22	DF	(Australia)	Anthony Pantazopoulos	6	0	0	2	0	0	8	0	0
2	5	MF	(Australia)	Dylan Scicluna	5	0	0	0	0	0	5	0	0
3	18	DF	(Australia)	Jacob Farrell	4	0	0	0	0	0	4	0	0
3	32	MF	(Australia)	Angus Thurgate	4	0	0	0	0	0	4	0	0
5	3	DF	(Australia)	Alex Gersbach	2	0	0	1	0	0	3	0	0
5	14	DF	(Australia)	Phillip Cancar	3	0	0	0	0	0	3	0	0
5	17	MF	(Australia)	Jarrod Carluccio	2	0	0	1	0	0	3	0	0
5	21	FW	(Australia)	Aydan Hammond	3	0	0	0	0	0	3	0	0
5	31	DF	(Australia)	Aidan Simmons	3	0	0	0	0	0	3	0	0
10	8	MF	(Australia)	Steven Ugarkovic	2	0	0	0	0	0	2	0	0
10	23	MF	(Bulgaria)	Bozhidar Kraev	2	0	0	0	0	0	2	0	0
10	26	FW	(Australia)	Brandon Borrello	2	0	0	0	0	0	2	0	0
10	45	FW	(Australia)	Alou Kuol	2	0	0	0	0	0	2	0	0
10	38	FW	(Australia)	Jai Rose	2	0	0	0	0	0	2	0	0
15	9	FW	(New Zealand)	Kosta Barbarouses	1	0	0	0	0	0	1	0	0
15	24	DF	(Australia)	Nathan Barrie	1	0	0	0	0	0	1	0	0
Player(s) transferred out but featured this season
1	2	DF	(Australia)	Gabriel Cleur	1	0	0	0	0	0	1	0	0
1	4	DF	(Australia)	Alex Bonetig	1	0	0	0	0	0	1	0	0
Total					46	0	0	4	0	0	50	0	0

=== Clean sheets ===
Includes all competitions. The list is sorted by squad number when total clean sheets are equal. Numbers in parentheses represent games where both goalkeepers participated and both kept a clean sheet; the number in parentheses is awarded to the goalkeeper who was substituted on, whilst a full clean sheet is awarded to the goalkeeper who was on the field at the start of play. Goalkeepers with no clean sheets not included in the list.

As of 25 April 2026

Rank	No.	Nat.	Goalkeeper	A-League Men	Australia Cup	Total
1	20	(Australia)	Lawrence Thomas	4	1	5
Total				4	1	5

== See also ==
- 2025–26 Western Sydney Wanderers FC (women) season
