= 2024–25 Western Sydney Wanderers FC season =

Western Sydney Wanderers FC 2024–25 Season

Western Sydney Wanderers
2024–25 season
- Chairman: Paul Lederer
- Manager: Alen Stajcic
- Stadium: CommBank Stadium
- A-League Men: 4th
- A-League Men Finals: Elimination-final
- Australia Cup: Quarter-final
- Top goalscorer: League: Nicolas Milanovic (11); All: Nicolas Milanovic (13)
- Highest home attendance: 27,496 vs. Sydney FC (19 October 2024); A-League Men
- Lowest home attendance: 6,220 vs. Newcastle Jets (8 November 2024); A-League Men
- Average home league attendance: 9,809
- Biggest win: 4–0 vs. Lions FC (A) (27 August 2024); Australia Cup; 4–0 vs. Central Coast Mariners (A) (22 February 2025); A-League Men
- Biggest defeat: 4–2 vs. Sydney FC (A) (23 November 2024); A-League Men; 1–3 vs. Central Coast Mariners (H) (17 January 2025); A-League Men
- All statistics correct as of 10 May 2025.

The 2024–25 season is the 13th in the history of Western Sydney Wanderers FC. In addition to the domestic league, Western Sydney Wanderers participated in the Australia Cup.

== Players ==
=== First-team squad ===
Note: Flags indicate national team as defined under FIFA eligibility rules; some limited exceptions apply. Players may hold more than one non-FIFA nationality.

No.	Pos.	Nation	Player
1	GK	AUS	Taiga Harper (scholarship)
2	DF	AUS	Gabriel Cleur
3	DF	AUS	Alex Gersbach
4	DF	AUS	Alex Bonetig
5	MF	MLT	Dylan Scicluna
6	MF	IRQ	Mohamed Al-Taay
7	FW	AUS	Zac Sapsford
8	DF	KOR	Jeong Tae-wook (on loan from Jeonbuk Hyundai Motors)
9	FW	SWE	Marcus Antonsson
13	MF	AUS	Dean Pelekanos
14	FW	AUS	Nicolas Milanovic
17	MF	AUS	Jarrod Carluccio
18	MF	AUS	Oscar Priestman (scholarship)

No.	Pos.	Nation	Player
19	DF	AUS	Jack Clisby
20	GK	AUS	Lawrence Thomas (captain)
21	FW	AUS	Aydan Hammond (scholarship)
22	DF	AUS	Anthony Pantazopoulos (scholarship)
23	MF	BUL	Bozhidar Kraev
24	DF	AUS	Nathan Barrie (scholarship)
25	MF	AUS	Joshua Brillante
26	FW	AUS	Brandon Borrello
27	FW	AUS	James Temelkovski
28	DF	AUS	Joshua Laws
30	GK	AUS	Jordan Holmes
31	DF	AUS	Aidan Simmons
64	MF	ESP	Juan Mata

Ruon Tongyik is on a Football Australia no-fault interim suspension from participation in football and club-related activities due to criminal charges placed on him in October 2023.

== Transfers ==
=== Transfers in ===
No.	Position	Player	Transferred from	Type/fee	Contract length	Date	Ref
23	MF	(Bulgaria) Bozhidar Kraev	Wellington Phoenix	Free transfer	2 years	16 July 2024	
8	DF	(South Korea) Jeong Tae-wook	(South Korea) Jeonbuk Hyundai Motors	Loan	1 year	3 August 2024	
30	GK	Jordan Holmes	(Australia) Rochedale Rovers	Free transfer	1 year	23 August 2024	
64	MF	(Spain) Juan Mata	Unattached	Free transfer	1 year	5 September 2024	
13	MF	Dean Pelekanos	(Australia) Rockdale Ilinden	Free transfer	1 year	10 September 2024	
27	FW	James Temelkovski	(Australia) Marconi Stallions	Free transfer	1 year	11 September 2024	
12	FW	Ben Holliday	(Australia) Moreton City Excelsior	Free transfer	1 year	25 September 2024	
3	DF	Alex Gersbach	(Sweden) Kalmar FF	Free transfer	2.5 years	15 January 2025	
17	MF	Jarrod Carluccio	Perth Glory	Free transfer	1.5 years	16 January 2025	
6	MF	(Iraq) Mohamed Al-Taay	Wellington Phoenix	Free transfer	1.5 years	23 January 2025	
28	DF	Joshua Laws	Unattached	Free transfer	5 months	10 February 2025	

==== From youth squad ====
No.	Position	Player	Age	Notes	Ref
24	DF	Nathan Barrie	18	3-year scholarship contract	

=== Transfers out ===
No.	Position	Player	Transferred to	Type/fee	Date	Ref
10	MF	(Serbia) Miloš Ninković	Retired		29 January 2024	
1	GK	Daniel Margush	Unattached	End of contract	30 May 2024	
5	MF	(Germany) Sonny Kittel	(Poland) Raków Częstochowa	End of loan	30 May 2024	
4	DF	Doni Grdić	Unattached	End of contract	6 June 2024	
11	FW	(South Sudan) Valentino Yuel	Unattached	End of contract	6 June 2024	
32	FW	Nathanael Blair	Perth Glory	End of contract	12 June 2024	
13	DF	Tate Russell	Western United	Mutual contract termination	14 June 2024	
7	MF	Dylan Pierias	Adelaide United	Mutual contract termination	21 June 2024	
6	DF	(Brazil) Marcelo	Unattached	Mutual contract termination	1 July 2024	
21	MF	(Netherlands) Jorrit Hendrix	Unattached	End of contract	10 July 2024	
17	FW	Lachlan Brook	(United States) Real Salt Lake	Undisclosed	23 July 2024	
11	FW	Marcus Younis	(Netherlands) Jong PSV	Loan	4 September 2024	
16	MF	Tom Beadling	Unattached	Mutual contract termination	5 December 2024	
12	FW	Ben Holliday	Unattached	Mutual contract termination	21 January 2025	
10	MF	Alexander Badolato	Melbourne Victory	Loan	13 February 2025	

=== Contract extensions ===
No.	Player	Position	Duration	Date	Notes	Ref.
21	Aydan Hammond	Winger	2 years	23 May 2024	scholarship contract	
22	Anthony Pantazopoulos	Centre-back	1 year	14 August 2024	scholarship contract	
11	Marcus Younis	Winger	2 years	4 September 2024	Contract extended from end of 2024–25 to end of 2026–27	
18	Oscar Priestman	Defensive midfielder	2 years	10 September 2024	Contract extended from end of 2024–25 to end of 2026–27	
14	Nicolas Milanovic	Winger	1 year	9 October 2024	Contract extended from end of 2024–25 to end of 2025–26	
5	(Malta) Dylan Scicluna	Central midfielder	2 years	3 February 2025	Contract extended from end of 2024–25 to end of 2026–27	
22	Anthony Pantazopoulos	Centre-back	2 years	7 March 2025	Contract extended from end of 2024–25 to end of 2026–27	
20	Lawrence Thomas	Goalkeeper	2 years	10 April 2025	Contract extended from end of 2024–25 to end of 2026–27	

== Pre-season and friendlies ==
Win Draw Loss

17 August 2024	Western Sydney Wanderers (Australia)	4–2	(New Zealand) Auckland FC	Sydney, Australia
13:00 AEST	Milanovic 21'; Borrello 38'; Sapsford 66', 90'	Report	Gillion 49'; Mata 81'	Stadium: Wanderers Football Park

28 September 2024	Western Sydney Wanderers (Australia)	2–0	(New Zealand) Wellington Phoenix	Sydney, Australia
		Report		Attendance: 0 (behind closed doors)

5 October 2024	Western Sydney Wanderers (Australia)	Cancelled	(Australia) Macarthur FC	Sydney, Australia
11:00 AEST		Cancellation		Stadium: Wanderers Football Park

11 October 2024	Western Sydney Wanderers (Australia)	5–1	(Australia) Central Coast Mariners	Sydney, Australia
		Report		Attendance: 0 (behind closed doors)

== Competitions ==
=== Overall Record ===
Competition	First match	Last match	Starting round	Final position	Record							
Competition	First match	Last match	Starting round	Final position	Pld	W	D	L	GF	GA	GD	Win %
A League Men	19 October 2024	3 May 2025	Matchday 1	4th	26	13	7	6	58	40	+18	50.00
A-League Men finals series	10 May 2025	10 May 2025	Elimination final	Elimination final	1	0	0	1	1	2	−1	0.00
Australia Cup	31 July 2024	12 September 2024	Round of 32	Quarter-finals	3	2	0	1	7	3	+4	66.67
Total					30	15	7	8	66	45	+21	50.00

Last updated: 10 May 2025
Source: Competitions

=== A-League Men ===
==== League table ====
Pos	Team	Pld	W	D	L	GF	GA	GD	Pts	Qualification
2	Melbourne City (C)	26	14	6	6	41	25	+16	48	Qualification for AFC Champions League Elite and Finals series
3	Western United	26	14	5	7	55	37	+18	47	Qualification for Finals series (Note: The top two teams enter the finals series at the semi-finals, while the teams ranked third to sixth enter the finals series at the elimination-finals.)
4	Western Sydney Wanderers	26	13	7	6	58	40	+18	46	Qualification for Finals series
5	Melbourne Victory	26	12	7	7	44	36	+8	43	Qualification for Finals series
6	Adelaide United	26	10	8	8	53	55	−2	38	Qualification for Finals series

Source: A-Leagues
Rules for classification: 1) points; 2) goal difference; 3) goals scored; 4) wins; 5) head-to-head results; 5a) head-to-head points; 5b) head-to-head goal difference; 6) Fair Play points; 7) away goal difference; 8) away goals per match; 9) home goal difference; 10) home goals per match; 11) toss of a coin in an event of a tie of two clubs.
(C) Champions

==== Results summary ====
Overall								Home						Away					
Pld	W	D	L	GF	GA	GD	Pts	W	D	L	GF	GA	GD	W	D	L	GF	GA	GD
26	13	7	6	58	40	+18	46	6	2	5	31	23	+8	7	5	1	27	17	+10

Last updated: 3 May 2025.
Source: Ultimate A-League
Away figures include Western Sydney Wanderers' 4–2 loss on neutral ground in Unite Round against Sydney FC on 23 November 2024.

==== Results by round ====
Round	1	2	3	4	5	6	7	8	9	10	11	12	13	14	15	16	17	18	19	20	21	22	23	24	25	26	27	28	29
Ground	H	A	H	H	N	A	B	H	H	A	H	A	B	A	H	H	A	A	H	A	H	B	H	A	A	H	H	A	A
Result	L	D	L	W	L	W	X	D	W	W	L	D	X	W	L	L	W	D	W	W	W	X	W	D	D	W	D	W	W
Position	10	11	11	8	10	8	9	10	7	7	7	7	8	8	8	8	8	8	8	5	4	6	3	5	4	4	4	4	4
Points	0	1	1	4	4	7	7	8	11	14	14	15	15	18	18	18	21	22	25	28	31	31	34	35	36	39	40	43	46

Updated to match(es) played on 3 May 2025. Source: Ultimate A-League
A = Away; H = Home; N = Neutral; B = Bye; W = Win; D = Draw; L = Loss; X = Bye

==== Matches ====
Win Draw Loss Fixtures

19 October 2024 1	Western Sydney Wanderers	1–2	Sydney FC	Sydney
19:35 AEDT	Hammond 56'	Report	Lolley 17'; Klimala 63'	Stadium: CommBank Stadium; Attendance: 27,496; Referee: Alex King

27 October 2024 2	Western United	1–1	Western Sydney Wanderers	Melbourne
16:00 AEDT	Ibusuki 48'	Report	Borrello 14'	Stadium: Ironbark Fields; Attendance: 4,207; Referee: Alireza Faghani

2 November 2024 3	Western Sydney Wanderers	3–4	Adelaide United	Sydney
19:35 AEDT	Milanovic 24'; Kraev 53'; Borrello 75'	Report	Jovanovic 4'; Ayoubi 21'; Pierias 27', 63'	Stadium: CommBank Stadium; Attendance: 7,244; Referee: Alex King

8 November 2024 4	Western Sydney Wanderers	4–1	Newcastle Jets	Sydney
19:35 AEDT	Milanovic 22', 33', 75' (pen.); Sapsford 55'	Report	Grozos 67' (pen.)	Stadium: CommBank Stadium; Attendance: 6,220; Referee: Jack Morgan

23 November 2024 5	Sydney FC	4–2	Western Sydney Wanderers	Sydney
19:35 AEDT	Lolley 33'; Courtney-Perkins 48'; Ouahum 54' (pen.); Klimala 83'	Report	Sapsford 45+4'; Antonsson 78'	Stadium: Allianz Stadium; Attendance: 30,777; Referee: Daniel Elder

30 November 2024 6	Melbourne City	0–2	Western Sydney Wanderers	Melbourne
17:00 AEDT		Report	Milanovic 45' (pen.); Antonsson 81'	Stadium: AAMI Park; Attendance: 5,060; Referee: Jonathan Barreiro

14 December 2024 8	Western Sydney Wanderers	2–2	Brisbane Roar	Sydney
19:35 AEDT	Borrello 10', 21'	Report	Cleur 13' (o.g.); Waddingham 31'	Stadium: CommBank Stadium; Attendance: 6,617; Referee: Daniel Elder

22 December 2024 9	Western Sydney Wanderers	4–1	Wellington Phoenix	Sydney
17:00 AEDT	Sapsford 1'; Kraev 10'; Antonsson 66'; Scicluna 90+4'	Report	Ishige 59'	Stadium: CommBank Stadium; Attendance: 6,341; Referee: Alex King

27 December 2024 10	Adelaide United	2–3	Western Sydney Wanderers	Adelaide
19:05 ACDT	Alagich 31'; Goodwin 34'	Report	Antonsson 45+1'; Borrello 49'; Kraev 82'	Stadium: Coopers Stadium; Attendance: 13,227; Referee: Daniel Cook

1 January 2025 11	Western Sydney Wanderers	2–3	Macarthur FC	Sydney
18:00 AEDT	Mata 23'; Pantazopoulos 55'	Report	Drew 13', 44'; Piol 26'	Stadium: CommBank Stadium; Attendance: 9,012; Referee: Casey Reibelt

4 January 2025 12	Melbourne Victory	2–2	Western Sydney Wanderers	Melbourne
19:35 AEDT	Miranda 29'; Teague 87' (pen.)	Report	Hammond 45'; Milanovic 76'	Stadium: AAMI Park; Attendance: 10,025; Referee: Lachlan Keevers

14 January 2025 14	Perth Glory	1–2	Western Sydney Wanderers	Perth
18:45 AWST	Taggart 48'	Report	Lebib 4' (o.g.); Sapsford 59'	Stadium: HBF Park; Attendance: 5,147; Referee: Shane Skinner

17 January 2025 15	Western Sydney Wanderers	1–3	Central Coast Mariners	Sydney
19:35 AEDT	Temelkovski 85'	Report	Kuol 14'; Edmondson 69'; Doka 90+4'	Stadium: CommBank Stadium; Attendance: 6,718; Referee: Alex King

26 January 2025 16	Western Sydney Wanderers	0–1	Auckland FC	Sydney
17:00 AEDT		Report	Moreno 90+5'	Stadium: CommBank Stadium; Attendance: 7,410; Referee: Shaun Evans

31 January 2025 17	Brisbane Roar	0–1	Western Sydney Wanderers	Brisbane
18:35 AEST		Report	Kraev 8'	Stadium: Suncorp Stadium; Attendance: 6,183; Referee: Alex King

8 February 2025 18	Sydney FC	3–3	Western Sydney Wanderers	Sydney
19:35 AEDT	Klimala 7'; Segecic 88'; Caceres 90+7'	Report	Sapsford 9', 49'; R. Grant 39' (o.g.)	Stadium: Allianz Stadium; Attendance: 32,741; Referee: Shaun Evans

16 February 2025 19	Western Sydney Wanderers	2–1	Macarthur FC	Sydney
17:00 AEDT	Milanovic 69'; Cleur 77'	Report	Pantazopoulos 56' (o.g.)	Stadium: CommBank Stadium; Attendance: 9,243; Referee: Alireza Faghani

22 February 2025 20	Central Coast Mariners	0–4	Western Sydney Wanderers	Gosford
17:00 AEDT		Report	Sapsford 6'; Clisby 13'; Milanovic 40'; Antonsson 72' (pen.)	Stadium: Industree Group Stadium; Attendance: 7,723; Referee: Adam Kersey

2 March 2025 21	Western Sydney Wanderers	4–1	Perth Glory	Sydney
17:00 AEDT	Hammond 14', 39'; Priestman 50'; Kraev 66'	Report	Taggart 5'	Stadium: CommBank Stadium; Attendance: 7,359; Referee: Lachlan Keevers

15 March 2025 23	Western Sydney Wanderers	4–2	Melbourne Victory	Sydney
19:35 AEDT	Kraev 44'; Borrello 76'; Milanovic 87'; Antonsson 90+4'	Report	Velupillay 34'; Piscopo 41'	Stadium: CommBank Stadium; Attendance: 10,387; Referee: Alex King

29 March 2025 24	Wellington Phoenix	2–2	Western Sydney Wanderers	Wellington
17:00 NZDT	Piper 21'; Geraldes 69'	Report	Kraev 36'; Milanovic 89'	Stadium: Sky Stadium; Attendance: 3,698; Referee: Adam Bavcar

5 April 2025 25	Auckland FC	1–1	Western Sydney Wanderers	Auckland
17:00 NZDT	Gallegos 45'	Report	Milanovic 51'	Stadium: Go Media Stadium; Attendance: 18,340; Referee: Alex King

13 April 2025 26	Western Sydney Wanderers	2–0	Western United	Sydney
17:00 AEST	Gersbach 45'; Sutton 66' (o.g.)	Report		Stadium: CommBank Stadium; Attendance: 13,041; Referee: Ben Abraham

19 April 2025 27	Western Sydney Wanderers	2–2	Melbourne City	Sydney
19:35 AEDT	Milanovic 9'; Trewin 13' (o.g.)	Report	Trewin 36', 86' (pen.)	Stadium: CommBank Stadium; Attendance: 10,428; Referee: Adam Kersey

26 April 2025 28	Newcastle Jets	0–1	Western Sydney Wanderers	Newcastle
17:00 AEST		Report	Sapsford 57'	Stadium: McDonald Jones Stadium; Attendance: 7,871; Referee: Tim Danaskos

3 May 2025 29	Macarthur FC	1–3	Western Sydney Wanderers	Sydney
19:35 AEST	Jakoliš 4'	Report	Kraev 21'; Pantazopoulos 55'; Antonsson 73'	Stadium: Campbelltown Stadium; Attendance: 9,213; Referee: Alex King

==== Finals series ====
9 May 2025 2025 A-League Men finals series	Western Sydney Wanderers	1–2	Melbourne Victory	Sydney
19:35 AEST	Sapsford 23'	Report	Bos 7'; Machach 42'	Stadium: CommBank Stadium; Attendance: 16,399; Referee: Adam Kersey

=== Australia Cup ===
Win Draw Loss

31 July 2024 Round of 32	Brisbane City	1–2	Western Sydney Wanderers	Brisbane
19:30 AEST	Maieroni 78'	Report	Cleur 4'; Badolato 7'	Stadium: Imperial Corp Stadium; Attendance: 1,794; Referee: Casey Reibelt

27 August 2024 Round of 16	Lions FC	0–4	Western Sydney Wanderers	Brisbane
19:30 AEST		Report	Milanovic 23'; Sapsford 53'; Antonsson 76'; Younis 84'	Stadium: Luxury Paints Stadium; Attendance: 1,853; Referee: Daniel Elder

12 September 2024 Quarter-finals	Adelaide United	2–1 (a.e.t.)	Western Sydney Wanderers	Adelaide
19:00 ACST	Ayoubi 9'; Kitto 93'	Report	Milanovic 68'	Stadium: ServiceFM Stadium; Attendance: 2,906; Referee: Shaun Evans

== Statistics ==
=== Appearances and goals ===
Includes all competitions. Players with no appearances not included in the list.

As of 10 May 2025

No.	Pos	Nat	Player	Total		A-League Men		A-League Men finals series		Australia Cup	
No.	Pos	Nat	Player	Apps	Goals	Apps	Goals	Apps	Goals	Apps	Goals
Goalkeepers
20	GK	(Australia) AUS	Lawrence Thomas	24	0	22	0	1	0	1	0
30	GK	(Australia) AUS	Jordan Holmes	1	0	1	0	0	0	0	0
40	GK	(Australia) AUS	Tristan Vidackovic	5	0	3	0	0	0	2	0
Defenders
2	DF	(Australia) AUS	Gabriel Cleur	23	2	21	1	1	0	1	1
3	DF	(Australia) AUS	Alex Gersbach	11	1	5+5	1	1	0	0	0
4	DF	(Australia) AUS	Alex Bonetig	30	0	26	0	1	0	3	0
8	DF	(South Korea) KOR	Jeong Tae-wook	7	0	5	0	0	0	2	0
19	DF	(Australia) AUS	Jack Clisby	24	1	18+3	1	0	0	3	0
22	DF	(Australia) AUS	Anthony Pantazopoulos	26	2	20+2	2	1	0	2+1	0
28	DF	(Australia) AUS	Joshua Laws	1	0	0+1	0	0	0	0	0
31	DF	(Australia) AUS	Aidan Simmons	6	0	0+4	0	0	0	0+2	0
41	DF	(Australia) AUS	Jesse Cameron	5	0	1+1	0	0	0	2+1	0
Midfielders
5	MF	(Malta) MLT	Dylan Scicluna	11	1	7+2	1	0	0	0+2	0
6	MF	(Iraq) IRQ	Mohamed Al-Taay	8	0	0+8	0	0	0	0	0
13	MF	(Australia) AUS	Dean Pelekanos	14	0	5+9	0	0	0	0	0
17	MF	(Australia) AUS	Jarrod Carluccio	9	0	1+7	0	0+1	0	0	0
18	MF	(Australia) AUS	Oscar Priestman	29	1	21+4	1	1	0	3	0
23	MF	(Bulgaria) BUL	Bozhidar Kraev	28	8	23+3	8	1	0	0+1	0
25	MF	(Australia) AUS	Josh Brillante	26	0	23	0	1	0	2	0
64	MF	(Spain) ESP	Juan Mata	23	1	7+15	1	0+1	0	0	0
Forwards
7	FW	(Australia) AUS	Zac Sapsford	29	10	21+4	8	1	1	3	1
9	FW	(Sweden) SWE	Marcus Antonsson	29	8	4+21	7	0+1	0	0+3	1
14	FW	(Australia) AUS	Nicolas Milanovic	29	14	22+3	12	1	0	3	2
21	FW	(Australia) AUS	Aydan Hammond	27	4	6+18	4	0+1	0	2	0
26	FW	(Australia) AUS	Brandon Borrello	29	6	24+1	6	1	0	3	0
27	FW	(Australia) AUS	James Temelkovski	8	1	0+8	1	0	0	0	0
44	FW	(Australia) AUS	Awan Lual	2	0	0	0	0	0	0+2	0
49	FW	(Australia) AUS	Alaat Abdul-Rahman	1	0	0+1	0	0	0	0	0
Player(s) transferred out but featured this season
10	MF	(Australia) AUS	Alexander Badolato	5	1	0+2	0	0	0	3	1
11	FW	(Australia) AUS	Marcus Younis	1	1	0	0	0	0	0+1	1
12	FW	(Australia) AUS	Ben Holliday	3	0	0+3	0	0	0	0	0
16	MF	(Australia) AUS	Tom Beadling	1	0	0	0	0	0	0+1	0

=== Disciplinary record ===
Includes all competitions. The list is sorted by squad number when total cards are equal. Players with no cards not included in the list.

As of 10 May 2025

Rank	No.	Pos.	Nat.	Name	A-League Men			A-League Men finals series			Australia Cup			Total		
Rank	No.	Pos.	Nat.	Name	Yellow card	(yellow card) (yellow-red card)	Red card	Yellow card	(yellow card) (yellow-red card)	Red card	Yellow card	(yellow card) (yellow-red card)	Red card	Yellow card	(yellow card) (yellow-red card)	Red card
1	13	MF	(Australia)	Dean Pelekanos	0	0	1	0	0	0	0	0	0	0	0	1
2	14	MF	(Australia)	Nicolas Milanovic	7	0	0	0	0	0	1	0	0	8	0	0
3	2	DF	(Australia)	Gabriel Cleur	6	0	0	0	0	0	0	0	0	6	0	0
3	18	MF	(Australia)	Oscar Priestman	4	0	0	0	0	0	2	0	0	6	0	0
3	22	DF	(Australia)	Anthony Pantazopoulos	6	0	0	0	0	0	0	0	0	6	0	0
6	26	FW	(Australia)	Brandon Borrello	5	0	0	0	0	0	0	0	0	5	0	0
7	23	MF	(Bulgaria)	Bozhidar Kraev	3	0	0	0	0	0	1	0	0	4	0	0
8	19	DF	(Australia)	Jack Clisby	2	0	0	0	0	0	0	0	0	2	0	0
8	21	FW	(Australia)	Aydan Hammond	2	0	0	0	0	0	0	0	0	2	0	0
10	3	DF	(Australia)	Alex Gersbach	1	0	0	0	0	0	0	0	0	1	0	0
10	5	MF	(Malta)	Dylan Scicluna	1	0	0	0	0	0	0	0	0	1	0	0
10	8	DF	(South Korea)	Jeong Tae-wook	0	0	0	0	0	0	1	0	0	1	0	0
10	20	GK	(Australia)	Lawrence Thomas	1	0	0	0	0	0	0	0	0	1	0	0
10	41	DF	(Australia)	Jesse Cameron	1	0	0	0	0	0	0	0	0	1	0	0
10	49	FW	(Australia)	Alaat Abdul-Rahman	1	0	0	0	0	0	0	0	0	1	0	0
Player(s) transferred out but featured this season
1	10	MF	(Australia)	Alexander Badolato	1	0	0	0	0	0	0	0	0	1	0	0
Total					41	0	1	0	0	0	5	0	0	46	0	1

=== Clean sheets ===
Includes all competitions. The list is sorted by squad number when total clean sheets are equal. Numbers in parentheses represent games where both goalkeepers participated and both kept a clean sheet; the number in parentheses is awarded to the goalkeeper who was substituted on, whilst a full clean sheet is awarded to the goalkeeper who was on the field at the start of play. Goalkeepers with no clean sheets not included in the list.

As of 10 May 2025

Rank	No.	Nat.	Goalkeeper	A-League Men	A-League Men finals series	Australia Cup	Total
1	20	(Australia)	Lawrence Thomas	5	0	0	5
2	40	(Australia)	Tristan Vidackovic	0	0	1	1
Total				5	0	1	6
