= 2026–27 Western Sydney Wanderers FC season =

Western Sydney Wanderers
2026–27 season
- Chairman: Paul Lederer
- Manager: Ufuk Talay
- Stadium: CommBank Stadium
- A-League Men: 2nd
- Australia Cup: Round of 16
- Top goalscorer: League: Brandon Borrello; Liam Gillion (3 goals); All: Brandon Borrello (4 goals)
- Highest home attendance: 8,283 vs. Auckland FC (24 October 2026); A-League Men
- Lowest home attendance: 7,082 vs. Adelaide United (20 November 2026); A-League Men
- Average home league attendance: 7,683
- Biggest win: 5–2 vs. Auckland FC (H) (24 October 2026); A-League Men
- Biggest defeat: 1–2 vs. Melbourne City (A) (7 November 2026); A-League Men
- All statistics correct as of 22 November 2026.

The 2026–27 season is the 15th in the history of Western Sydney Wanderers FC. In addition to the domestic league, Western Sydney Wanderers participated in the Australia Cup.

In March 2026, the club announced the appointment of former Sydney FC coach Ufuk Talay as head coach for the next two seasons.

== Players ==
=== First-team squad ===
Note: Flags indicate national team as defined under FIFA eligibility rules; some limited exceptions apply. Players may hold more than one non-FIFA nationality.

No.	Pos.	Nation	Player
3	DF	AUS	Alex Gersbach (vice-captain)
6	MF	AUS	Steven Ugarkovic
7	FW	AUS	Aydan Hammond
8	MF	AUS	Dylan Scicluna
9	FW	JPN	Hiroshi Ibusuki
10	MF	AUS	Miguel Di Pizio
11	FW	AUS	Atiya Waraga
14	FW	AUS	Nicolas Milanovic
16	DF	AUS	Oscar Morrison
17	MF	AUS	Jarrod Carluccio
19	FW	AUS	Awan Lual (scholarship)
20	GK	AUS	Lawrence Thomas
21	FW	NZL	Liam Gillion
22	DF	AUS	Anthony Pantazopoulos
23	GK	AUS	Jordan Holmes

No.	Pos.	Nation	Player
24	DF	AUS	Nathan Barrie (scholarship)
25	DF	AUS	Emile Katrib
26	FW	AUS	Brandon Borrello (captain)
27	FW	AUS	Jai Rose (scholarship)
28	MF	AUS	Josh Cetinic
29	FW	AUS	Georgio Hassarati
32	MF	AUS	Angus Thurgate
33	DF	ARG	Germán Ferreyra (vice-captain)
34	DF	NZL	Ricky Fransen (scholarship)
35	DF	AUS	Marcus Savic
36	DF	AUS	Panashe Madanha
37	FW	AUS	Alaat Abdul-Rahman (scholarship)
55	GK	AUS	Tristan Vidackovic
—	DF	AUS	Ben Mewett (scholarship)

== Transfers ==
=== Transfers in ===
No.	Position	Player	Transferred from	Type/fee	Contract length	Date	Ref
10	MF	Miguel Di Pizio	Central Coast Mariners	Free transfer	2 years	1 July 2026	
21	FW	(New Zealand) Liam Gillion	Auckland FC	Free transfer	2 years	1 July 2026	
36	DF	Panashe Madanha	Adelaide United	Free transfer	2 years	1 July 2026	
14	MF	Nicolas Milanovic	(Scotland) Aberdeen	Undisclosed	3 years	8 July 2026	
33	DF	(Argentina) Germán Ferreyra	Unattached	Free transfer	3 years	15 July 2026	

==== From youth squad ====
No.	Position	Player	Age	Notes	Ref
31	FW	Atiya Waraga	19		
16	DF	Oscar Morrison	19		
29	FW	Georgio Hassarati	17		
28	MF	Josh Cetinic	18		
25	DF	Emile Katrib	16		
35	DF	Marcus Savic	17	2-year contract	

=== Transfers out ===
No.	Position	Player	Transferred to	Type/fee	Date	Ref
25	MF	Joshua Brillante	(Australia) Bankstown City	End of contract	26 June 2026	
9	FW	(New Zealand) Kosta Barbarouses	Unattached	End of contract	30 June 2026	
14	DF	Phillip Cancar	Unattached	End of contract	30 June 2026	
18	DF	Jacob Farrell	(England) Portsmouth	End of loan	30 June 2026	
19	DF	Ruon Tongyik	Unattached	End of contract	30 June 2026	
23	MF	(Bulgaria) Bozhidar Kraev	Unattached	End of contract	30 June 2026	
31	DF	Aidan Simmons	(Japan) Tochigi City	End of contract	30 June 2026	
45	FW	Alou Kuol	(Australia) Blacktown City	End of contract	30 June 2026	
7	FW	(Scotland) Ryan Fraser	Macarthur FC	End of contract	31 August 2026	

=== Contract extensions ===
No.	Player	Position	Duration	Date	Notes	Ref.
7	Aydan Hammond	Winger		10 June 2026		
17	Jarrod Carluccio	Winger	2 years	12 June 2026		
55	Tristan Vidackovic	Goalkeeper	2 years	13 June 2026		

== Pre-season and friendlies ==
Win Draw Loss

15 July 2026	Western Sydney Wanderers (Australia)	11–0	(Australia) Hakoah	Sydney, Australia
	Borrello 11' (?); Hammond (?); Ibusuki (?); Rose (?); ? (?)	Report		Attendance: 0 (behind closed doors)

28 July 2026 2026 Sydney Super Cup	Western Sydney Wanderers (Australia)	4–6	(England) Chelsea	Sydney, Australia
	Pantazopoulos 14'; Hammond 32'; Scicluna 62'; Lual 78'	Report	Satpayev 6'; Essugo 38'; Gittens 66'; João Pedro 80', 85', 89'	Stadium: Accor Stadium; Attendance: 50,000; Referee: Daniel Elder

15 August 2026	Western Sydney Wanderers (Australia)	5–4	(Australia) Newcastle Jets	Sydney, Australia
	Waraga; Rose; Gillion	Report	Goal	Attendance: 0 (behind closed doors)

22 August 2026	Western Sydney Wanderers (Australia)	1–0	(Australia) Macarthur FC	Sydney, Australia
11:00 AEST		Report		Stadium: Wanderers Football Park; Attendance: 0 (behind closed doors)

16 September 2026	Western Sydney Wanderers (Australia)	4–0	(New Zealand) Wellington Phoenix	Sydney, Australia
	Waraga; Gillion; Di Pizio; Ibusuki	Report		Stadium: Wanderers Football Park; Attendance: 0 (behind closed doors)

19 September 2026	Auckland FC (New Zealand)	1–3	(Australia) Western Sydney Wanderers	Napier, New Zealand
15:00 NZST	Bayliss 29'	Report	Borrello 4', 49'; Gillion 12'	Stadium: McLean Park; Attendance: 5,000+

26 September 2026	Western Sydney Wanderers (Australia)	5–1	(Australia) Central Coast Mariners	Sydney, Australia
15:00 AEST	Gersbach; Di Pizio; Thurgate; Hammond; Lual	Report	Auglah	Stadium: Wanderers Football Park; Attendance: TBA (members only)

== Competitions ==
=== Overall record ===
Competition	First match	Last match	Starting round	Final position	Record							
Competition	First match	Last match	Starting round	Final position	Pld	W	D	L	GF	GA	GD	Win %
A League Men	16 October	8 May 2027	Matchday 1		5	2	2	1	10	6	+4	40.00
Australia Cup	22 July 2026	8 August 2026	Round of 32	Round of 16	2	1	1	0	3	1	+2	50.00
Total					7	3	3	1	13	7	+6	42.86

Last updated: 22 November 2026
Source: Competitions

=== A-League Men ===
==== League table ====
Pos	Team	Pld	W	D	L	GF	GA	GD	Pts	Qualification
1	Wellington Phoenix (Note: Auckland FC and Wellington Phoenix cannot qualify for Asian Football Confederation competitions as they are based in New Zealand, which is part of the Oceania Football Confederation.)	4	3	1	0	7	1	+6	10	Qualification for the finals series (Note: The top two teams enter the finals series at the semi-finals, while the teams ranked third to sixth enter the finals series at the elimination-finals.)
2	Western Sydney Wanderers	5	2	2	1	10	6	+4	8	Qualification for the AFC Champions League Elite league stage and the finals series
3	Sydney FC	5	2	2	1	7	4	+3	8	Qualification for the AFC Champions League Elite preliminary stage and the finals series
4	Brisbane Roar	4	2	2	0	5	3	+2	8	Qualification for the finals series
5	Perth Glory	5	2	1	2	8	5	+3	7	Qualification for the finals series

Updated to match(es) played on 21 November 2026. Source: A-Leagues
Rules for classification: 1) points; 2) goal difference; 3) goals scored; 4) wins; 5) head-to-head results; 5a) head-to-head points; 5b) head-to-head goal difference; 6) Fair Play points; 7) away goal difference; 8) away goals per match; 9) home goal difference; 10) home goals per match; 11) toss of a coin in an event of a tie of two clubs.

==== Results summary ====
Overall								Home						Away					
Pld	W	D	L	GF	GA	GD	Pts	W	D	L	GF	GA	GD	W	D	L	GF	GA	GD
5	2	2	1	10	6	+4	8	2	0	0	9	4	+5	0	2	1	1	2	−1

Last updated: 22 November 2026.
Source: Ultimate A-League

==== Results by round ====
Round	1	2	3	4	5	6	7	8	9	10	11	12	13	14	15	16	17	18	19	20	21	22	23	24	25	26	27	28
Ground	A	H	A	A	H	B	H	H	A	H	H	A	A	H	H	A	A	B	A	H	H	H	A	H	A	A	H	A
Result	D	W	D	L	W	X												X										
Position	7	2	2	6	2																							
Points	1	4	5	5	8																							

Updated to match(es) played on 22 November 2026. Source: Ultimate A-League
A = Away; H = Home; W = Win; D = Draw; L = Loss; X = Bye

==== Matches ====
Win Draw Loss Fixtures

16 October 2026 1	Sydney FC	0–0	Western Sydney Wanderers	Sydney
20:00 AEDT		Report		Stadium: Allianz Stadium; Attendance: 30,103; Referee: Alex King

24 October 2026 2	Western Sydney Wanderers	5–2	Auckland FC	Sydney
19:00 AEDT	Borrello 43'; Gillion 46'; Milanovic 50'; Di Pizio 86'; Waraga 89'	Report	Vicelich 24'; Borrello 68' (o.g.)	Stadium: CommBank Stadium; Attendance: 8,283; Referee: Shaun Evans

31 October 2026 3	Macarthur FC	0–0	Western Sydney Wanderers	Sydney
19:40 AEDT		Report		Stadium: Campbelltown Sports Stadium; Attendance: 6,232; Referee: Daniel Elder

7 November 2026 4	Melbourne City	2–1	Western Sydney Wanderers	Melbourne
19:40 AEDT	Rossetto 4'; Nabbout 62'	Report	Milanovic 45'	Stadium: AAMI Park; Attendance: 4,939; Referee: Alireza Faghani

20 November 2026 5	Western Sydney Wanderers	4–2	Adelaide United	Sydney
19:40 AEDT	Borrello 47', 57' (pen.); Gillion 88', 90+3'	Report	Barnett 43'; Goodwin 53'	Stadium: CommBank Stadium; Attendance: 7,082; Referee: Alex King

5 December 2026 7	Western Sydney Wanderers	v	Perth Glory	Sydney
19:40 AEDT		Source		Stadium: CommBank Stadium

13 December 2026 8	Western Sydney Wanderers	v	Wellington Phoenix	Sydney
17:00 AEDT		Source		Stadium: CommBank Stadium

19 December 2026 9	Brisbane Roar	v	Western Sydney Wanderers	Brisbane
16:00 AEST		Source		Stadium: Kayo Stadium

26 December 2026 10	Western Sydney Wanderers	v	Newcastle Jets	Sydney
19:40 AEDT		Source		Stadium: CommBank Stadium

1 January 2027 11	Western Sydney Wanderers	v	Macarthur FC	Sydney
19:00 AEDT		Source		Stadium: CommBank Stadium

8 January 2027 12	Central Coast Mariners	v	Western Sydney Wanderers	Gosford
19:40 AEDT		Source		Stadium: polytec Stadium

17 January 2027 13	Adelaide United	v	Western Sydney Wanderers	Adelaide
16:30 ACDT		Source		Stadium: Coopers Stadium

22 January 2027 14	Western Sydney Wanderers	v	Melbourne City	Sydney
19:40 AEST		Source		Stadium: CommBank Stadium

30 January 2027 15	Western Sydney Wanderers	v	Sydney FC	Sydney
19:40 AEST		Source		Stadium: CommBank Stadium

6 February 2027 16	Wellington Phoenix	v	Western Sydney Wanderers	Christchurch
17:00 NZDT		Source		Stadium: One New Zealand Stadium

14 February 2027 17	Melbourne Victory	v	Western Sydney Wanderers	Melbourne
17:00 AEDT		Source		Stadium: AAMI Park

26 February 2027 19	Newcastle Jets	v	Western Sydney Wanderers	Newcastle
19:40 AEDT		Source		Stadium: McDonald Jones Stadium

7 March 2027 20	Western Sydney Wanderers	v	Brisbane Roar	Sydney
15:00 AEST		Source		Stadium: CommBank Stadium

12 March 2027 21	Western Sydney Wanderers	v	Melbourne City	Sydney
19:40 AEST		Source		Stadium: CommBank Stadium

20 March 2027 22	Western Sydney Wanderers	v	Auckland FC	Sydney
19:00 AEDT		Source		Stadium: CommBank Stadium

3 April 2027 23	Sydney FC	v	Western Sydney Wanderers	Sydney
19:40 AEDT		Source		Stadium: Allianz Stadium

11 April 2027 24	Western Sydney Wanderers	v	Central Coast Mariners	Sydney
15:00 AEST		Source		Stadium: CommBank Stadium

18 April 2027 25	Macarthur FC	v	Western Sydney Wanderers	Sydney
15:00 AEST		Source		Stadium: Campbelltown Sports Stadium

24 April 2027 26	Perth Glory	v	Western Sydney Wanderers	Perth
19:45 AWST		Source		Stadium: HBF Park

2 May 2027 27	Western Sydney Wanderers	v	Melbourne Victory	Sydney
15:00 AEST		Source		Stadium: CommBank Stadium

8 May 2027 28	Auckland FC	v	Western Sydney Wanderers	Auckland
20:00 NZST		Source		Stadium: Go Media Stadium

=== Australia Cup ===
22 July 2026 Round of 32	Tigers FC	0–2	Western Sydney Wanderers	Canberra
19:30 AEST		Report	Di Pizio 67'; Borello 71'	Stadium: McKellar Park; Attendance: 1,948; Referee: Christopher Hodson

8 August 2026 Round of 16	Western Sydney Wanderers	1–1 (a.e.t.) (2–3 p)	Melbourne Victory	Sydney
19:30 AEST	Milanovic 102'	Report	Sawyer 96'	Stadium: Marconi Stadium; Referee: Adam Bavcar
	Penalties
	Milanovic (penalty scored); Borrello (penalty scored); Scicluna (penalty missed); Lual (penalty missed); Gersbach (penalty missed)		(penalty scored) D'Arrigo; (penalty scored) Sawyer; (penalty scored) Ghossaini; (penalty missed) Nduka

== Statistics ==
=== Appearances and goals ===
Includes all competitions. Players with no appearances not included in the list.

As of 22 November 2026

No.	Pos	Nat	Player	Total		A-League Men		Australia Cup	
No.	Pos	Nat	Player	Apps	Goals	Apps	Goals	Apps	Goals
3	DF	(Australia) AUS	Alex Gersbach	4	0	1+1	0	2	0
6	MF	(Australia) AUS	Steven Ugarkovic	2	0	0+1	0	0+1	0
7	FW	(Australia) AUS	Aydan Hammond	7	0	1+4	0	2	0
8	MF	(Australia) AUS	Dylan Scicluna	7	0	5	0	2	0
9	FW	(Japan) JPN	Hiroshi Ibusuki	5	0	0+5	0	0	0
10	MF	(Australia) AUS	Miguel Di Pizio	7	2	5	1	2	1
11 (Note: Atiya Waraga wears number 11 in the A-League Men and 31 in the Australia Cup)	FW	(Australia) AUS	Atiya Waraga	7	1	0+5	1	0+2	0
14	FW	(Australia) AUS	Nicolas Milanovic	6	3	5	2	0+1	1
17	MF	(Australia) AUS	Jarrod Carluccio	6	0	4+1	0	0+1	0
19	FW	(Australia) AUS	Awan Lual	3	0	1	0	0+2	0
20	GK	(Australia) AUS	Lawrence Thomas	5	0	5	0	0	0
21	FW	(New Zealand) NZL	Liam Gillion	7	3	4+1	3	2	0
22	DF	(Australia) AUS	Anthony Pantazopoulos	3	0	1	0	2	0
23	GK	(Australia) AUS	Jordan Holmes	1	0	0	0	1	0
24	DF	(Australia) AUS	Nathan Barrie	4	0	3+1	0	0	0
26	FW	(Australia) AUS	Brandon Borrello	6	4	4	3	2	1
27	FW	(Australia) AUS	Jai Rose	1	0	0	0	0+1	0
32	MF	(Australia) AUS	Angus Thurgate	7	0	5	0	2	0
33	DF	(Argentina) ARG	Germán Ferreyra	7	0	5	0	2	0
35	DF	(Australia) AUS	Marcus Savic	1	0	0+1	0	0	0
36	DF	(Australia) AUS	Panashe Madanha	7	0	5	0	2	0
55	GK	(Australia) AUS	Tristan Vidackovic	1	0	0	0	1	0

=== Disciplinary record ===
Includes all competitions. The list is sorted by squad number when total cards are equal. Players with no cards not included in the list.

As of 22 November 2026

Rank	No.	Pos.	Nat.	Name	A-League Men			Australia Cup			Total		
Rank	No.	Pos.	Nat.	Name	Yellow card	(yellow card) (yellow-red card)	Red card	Yellow card	(yellow card) (yellow-red card)	Red card	Yellow card	(yellow card) (yellow-red card)	Red card
1	8	MF	(Australia)	Dylan Scicluna	2	0	0	0	0	0	2	0	0
1	10	MF	(Australia)	Miguel Di Pizio	2	0	0	0	0	0	2	0	0
3	14	FW	(Australia)	Nicolas Milanovic	1	0	0	0	0	0	1	0	0
3	17	MF	(Australia)	Jarrod Carluccio	1	0	0	0	0	0	1	0	0
3	26	FW	(Australia)	Brandon Borrello	0	0	0	1	0	0	1	0	0
3	33	DF	(Argentina)	Germán Ferreyra	1	0	0	0	0	0	1	0	0
3	36	DF	(Australia)	Panashe Madanha	1	0	0	0	0	0	1	0	0
Total					8	0	0	1	0	0	9	0	0

=== Clean sheets ===
Includes all competitions. The list is sorted by squad number when total clean sheets are equal. Numbers in parentheses represent games where both goalkeepers participated and both kept a clean sheet; the number in parentheses is awarded to the goalkeeper who was substituted on, whilst a full clean sheet is awarded to the goalkeeper who was on the field at the start of play. Goalkeepers with no clean sheets not included in the list.

As of 22 November 2026

Rank	No.	Nat.	Goalkeeper	A-League Men	Australia Cup	Total
1	20	(Australia)	Lawrence Thomas	2	0	2
2	55	(Australia)	Tristan Vidackovic	0	1	1
Total				2	1	3

== See also ==
- 2026–27 Western Sydney Wanderers FC (women) season
