= Macarthur FC–Western Sydney Wanderers FC rivalry =

Soccer rivalry in Australia

Macarthur FC v Western Sydney Wanderers FC
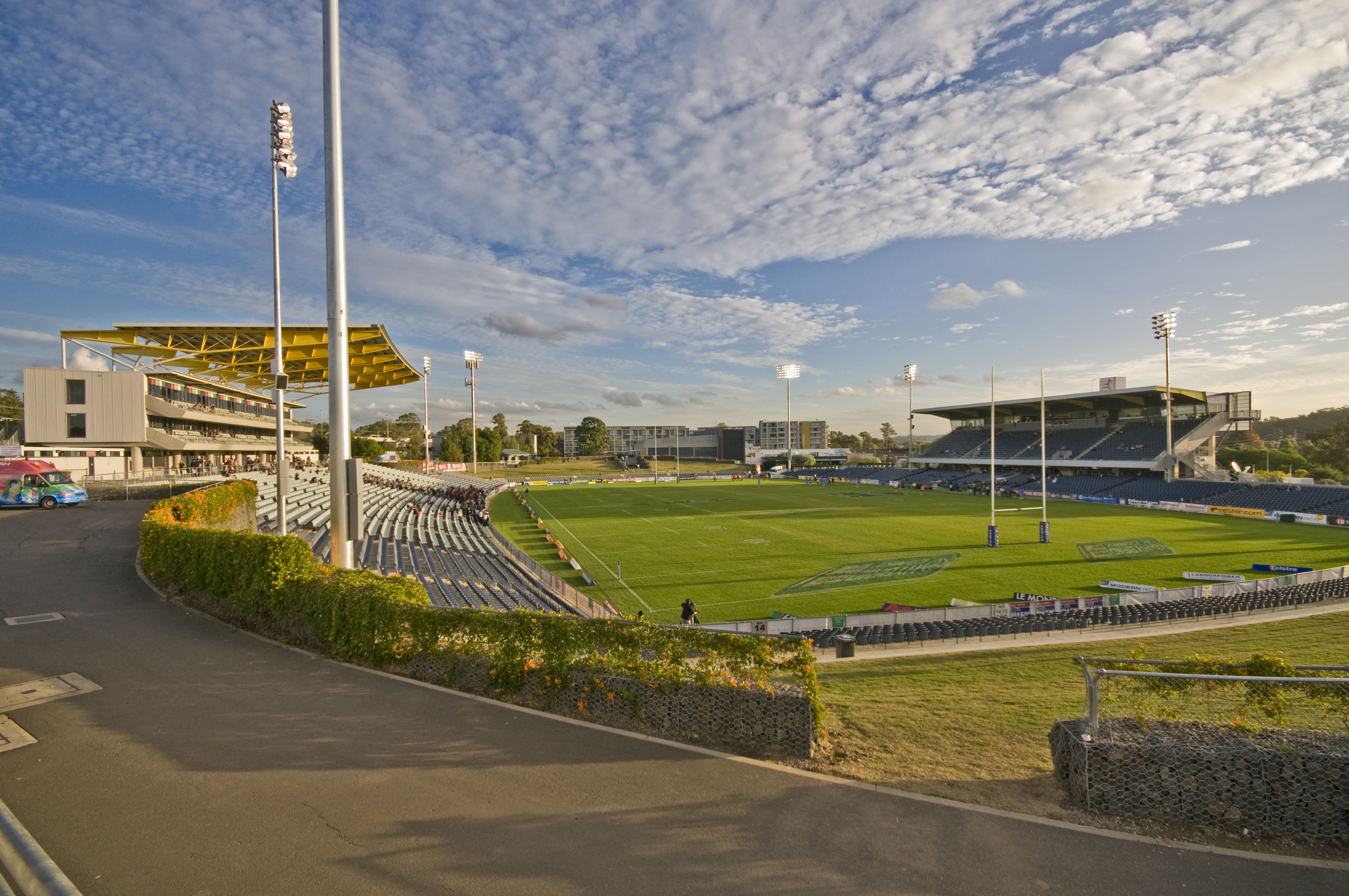
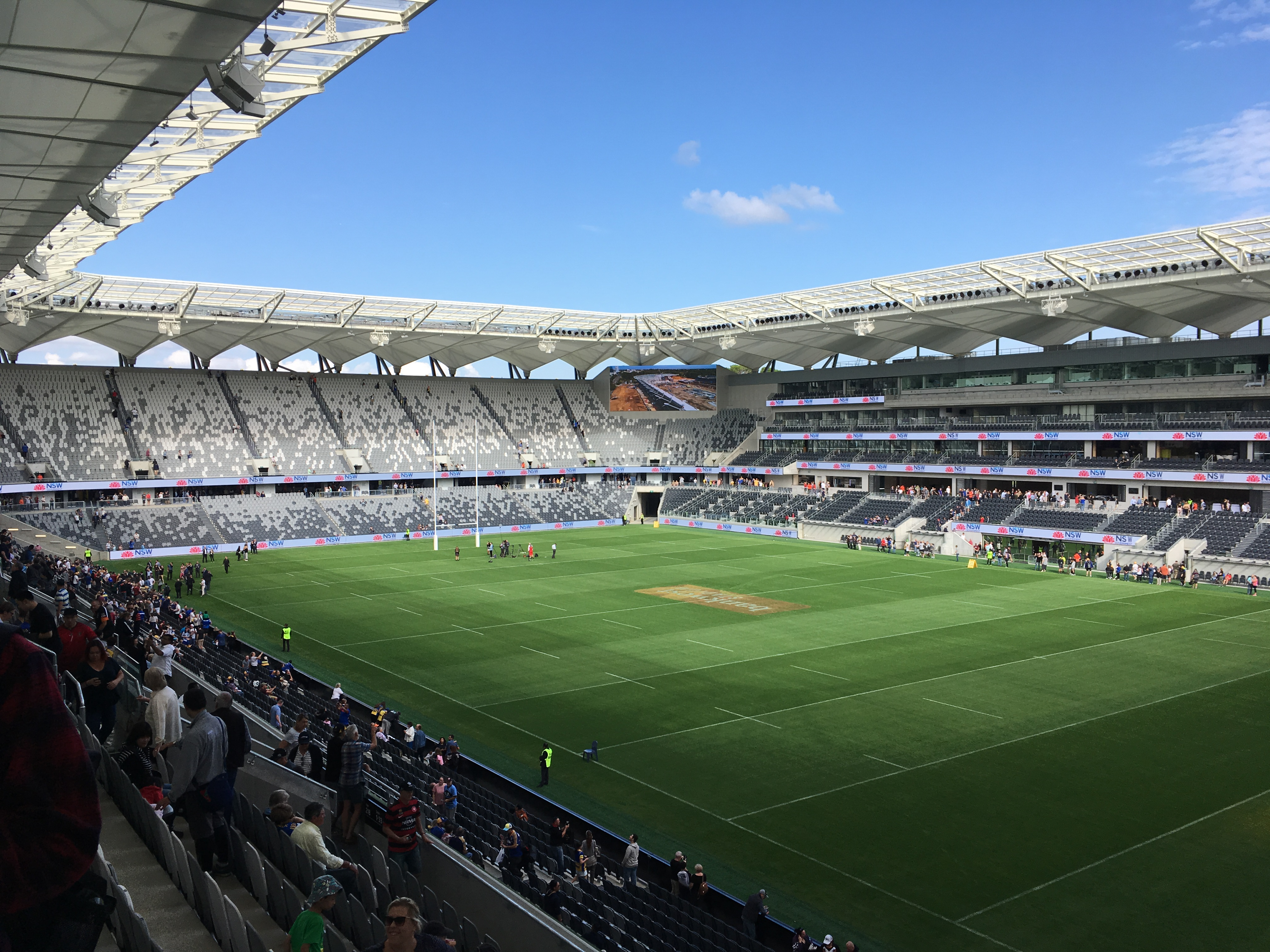
- Campbelltown Sports Stadium (left) and Western Sydney Stadium (right)
- Other names: Battle of the West; Western Sydney Derby
- Location: Greater Western Sydney
- Teams: Macarthur FC; Western Sydney Wanderers
- First meeting: 30 December 2020; A-League; WS Wanderers 0–1 Macarthur FC
- Latest meeting: 31 October 2026; A-League Men; Macarthur FC 0–0 WS Wanderers
- Next meeting: 1 January 2027; A-League Men; WS Wanderers – Macarthur FC
- Stadiums: Campbelltown Sports Stadium (Macarthur FC); Western Sydney Stadium (WS Wanderers)

Statistics
- Total meetings: 18
- Most wins: WS Wanderers (7)
- Top scorer: Brandon Borrello (5)
- All-time series: Macarthur FC: 6 Drawn: 5 Western Sydney Wanderers: 7
- Largest victory: WS Wanderers 4–0 Macarthur FC (1 January 2023, 25 February 2023); Macarthur FC 0–4 WS Wanderers (28 February 2026)

The Macarthur FC–Western Sydney Wanderers FC rivalry is a rivalry between Sydney-based professional soccer clubs Macarthur Football Club and Western Sydney Wanderers Football Club.

== Background ==
The rivalry between Macarthur FC and Western Sydney Wanderers stems from the geographical locations of both clubs within Western Sydney. Macarthur FC represents South Western Sydney, with its home ground, Campbelltown Sports Stadium, in Campbelltown, and its temporary training ground, Fairfield Showground, located in Prairiewood. In contrast, Western Sydney Wanderers represent Greater Western Sydney, with their home ground at Western Sydney Stadium in Parramatta and their training ground at Blacktown Football Park in Rooty Hill. In terms of success, the Wanderers are the most successful club in Western Sydney, having an A-League Premiership and an AFC Champions League title to their name. Macarthur, the younger club, has not to date won an A-League Men Premiership or Championship, but it has twice won national silverware, the 2022 Australia Cup and the 2024 Australia Cup.

Despite being local rivals, Sydney FC is widely regarded as the Wanderers' main rival, with intense and fierce matches in the Sydney Derby. Macarthur FC was initially established in 2018 as a merger between two bids, originally known as Macarthur South West United. They earned their A-League spot in December 2018, and were later renamed and founded as Macarthur FC in May 2019. This transformation was driven by the rapid growth of football's popularity in the club's region, one of the fastest-growing areas in the country. According to Gino Marra, Macarthur's chairman, approximately 35,000 people in the region were not supporting an A-League team, and introducing a local rival was seen as a way to expand the club's fan base within the region.

== History ==
The first meeting between Macarthur FC and Western Sydney Wanderers occurred on the opening matchday of the 2020–21 A-League season. The initial date for the match was on 27 December 2020 at Western Sydney Stadium, but due to a COVID-19 outbreak, it was moved three days back to 30 December 2020. Around 10,128 fans were in attendance that day as Macarthur won 1–0 over Western Sydney Wanderers after Mark Milligan scored the only goal from a free kick taken by Beñat. In the returning fixture on 6 February 2021 at Campbelltown, Macarthur drew 2–2 with the Wanderers. Goals from Aleksandar Jovanovic and Aleksandar Šušnjar kept the Bulls in the lead before Graham Dorrans and Simon Cox equalised the match by full-time.

By the end of the season, Macarthur FC finished in sixth with 39 points, above Western Sydney Wanderers, who sat in eighth with 35 points. In the 2021–22 A-League season, Macarthur finished seventh with 33 points, missing out on the A-League Finals Series by 6 points, although finishing higher than the Wanderers who placed in tenth with 27 points. Macarthur FC won two out of the three matches against Western Sydney Wanderers, defeating their opponents 2–0 at home that led Wanderers fans to boo their players on the field. Carl Robinson, who made his managerial start in the first meeting against Macarthur, was sacked by Western Sydney Wanderers in January 2022. Macarthur then achieved their first win at home on 13 March 2022, with Ulises Dávila scoring twice to ensure a 3–1 victory over Wanderers. In the 2022–23 season, Western Sydney Wanderers achieved their first win over Macarthur on 1 January 2023, following a 4–0 victory at Western Sydney Stadium. In their next and seventh league meeting, Western Sydney Wanderers won for a second time at home, with another 4–0 victory; Brandon Borrello scored the opening goal before Macarthur's Craig Noone was sent off – all within six minutes of the match. On 8 April 2023, the eighth meeting between the two sides was played at Campbelltown Sports Stadium. 2 goals from Brandon Borrello including a 95th minute equaliser and goals from Lachlan Rose and Al Hassan Toure meant a 2–2 draw was the result by full-time.

== Statistics and records ==
As of 2 November 2026

=== Head-to-head ===
Stadium	GP	MAC	Draw	WSW	MAC goals	WSW goals
Campbelltown Sports Stadium	10	2	5	3	15	20
Western Sydney Stadium	8	4	0	4	9	15
Total	18	6	5	7	24	35

=== Top goalscorers ===
Note: Players who have scored two goals or more are listed here

Player	Club	Goals
(Australia) Brandon Borrello	Western Sydney Wanderers	5
(France) Valère Germain	Macarthur FC	3
(Australia) Nicolas Milanovic	Western Sydney Wanderers	3
(Australia) Anthony Pantazopoulos	Western Sydney Wanderers	3
(Sweden) Marcus Antonsson	Western Sydney Wanderers	2
(Australia) Lachlan Brook	Western Sydney Wanderers	2
(Mexico) Ulises Dávila	Macarthur FC	2
(Australia) Jed Drew	Macarthur FC	2
(Australia) Jake Hollman	Macarthur FC	2
(Bulgaria) Bozhidar Kraev	Western Sydney Wanderers	2

== Results ==
Competition	#	Date	Rnd	Home team	Score	Away team	Goals (home)	Goals (away)	Venue	Attendance
2020–21 A-League	1	30 December 2020	1	Wanderers	0–1	Macarthur	—	Milligan (72)	Western Sydney Stadium	10,128
2020–21 A-League	2	6 February 2021	7	Macarthur	2–2	Wanderers	Jovanovic (18), Šušnjar (58)	Dorrans (52), Cox (71)	Campbelltown Sports Stadium	4,723
2021–22 A-League Men	3	11 December 2021	4	Wanderers	0–2	Macarthur	—	Uskok (64), Hollman (74)	Western Sydney Stadium	8,910
2021–22 A-League Men	4	12 March 2022	18	Macarthur	3–1	Wanderers	Noone (8), Dávila (73, 90+8)	Antonis (80)	Campbelltown Sports Stadium	4,723
2021–22 A-League Men	5	8 May 2022	11	Macarthur	1–1	Wanderers	Juric (55)	Carluccio (10)	Campbelltown Sports Stadium	0 (Note: Held behind closed doors due to the COVID-19 pandemic in Australia.)
2022–23 A-League Men	6	1 January 2023	10	Wanderers	4–0	Macarthur	Ngbakoto (16), Bozanic (18), Borrello (70), Najjarine (88)	—	Western Sydney Stadium	10,751
2022–23 A-League Men	7	25 February 2023	18	Wanderers	4–0	Macarthur	Borrello (3), Amalfitano (37), Schneiderlin (56), Nieuwenhof (61)	—	Western Sydney Stadium	7,051
2022–23 A-League Men	8	8 April 2023	23	Macarthur	2–2	Wanderers	Rose (66), Toure (90+1)	Borrello (42, 90+5)	Campbelltown Sports Stadium	7,534
2023–24 A-League Men	9	1 January 2024	10	Wanderers	3–1	Macarthur	Antonsson (3), Simmons (12), Yuel (84)	Hollman (20)	Western Sydney Stadium	11,382
2023–24 A-League Men	10	4 February 2024	15	Macarthur	4–3	Wanderers	Germain (18, 45+4, 90+3), Rodrigues (32)	Brook (20, 42), Milanovic (28)	Campbelltown Sports Stadium	5,102
2023–24 A-League Men	11	1 April 2024	22	Macarthur	1–3	Wanderers	Millar (86)	Milanovic (57), Kittel (65), Hendrix (70)	Campbelltown Sports Stadium	6,238
2024–25 A-League Men	12	1 January 2025	11	Wanderers	2–3	Macarthur	Mata (23), Pantazopoulos (55)	Drew (13, 44), Piol (26)	Western Sydney Stadium	9,012
2024–25 A-League Men	13	16 February 2025	18	Wanderers	2–1	Macarthur	Milanovic (67), Cleur (77)	Pantazopoulos (56 o.g.)	Western Sydney Stadium	9,243
2024–25 A-League Men	14	3 May 2025	26	Macarthur	1–3	Wanderers	Jakoliš (4)	Kraev (21), Pantazopoulos (55), Antonsson (73)	Campbelltown Sports Stadium	9,213
2025–26 A-League Men	15	1 November 2025	3	Macarthur	1–1	Wanderers	Sawyer (2)	Pantazopoulos (82)	Campbelltown Sports Stadium	7,605
2025–26 A-League Men	16	1 January 2026	11	Wanderers	0–1	Macarthur	—	Durán (41)	Western Sydney Stadium	8,048
2025–26 A-League Men	17	28 February 2026	17	Macarthur	0–4	Wanderers	—	Ugarkovic (6), Kraev (24), Fraser (43), Borrello (70)	Campbelltown Sports Stadium	5,321
2026–27 A-League Men	18	31 October 2026	3	Macarthur	0–0	Wanderers	—	—	Campbelltown Sports Stadium	6,232
2026–27 A-League Men	19	1 January 2027	11	Wanderers	–	Macarthur			Western Sydney Stadium	
2026–27 A-League Men	20	18 April 2027	25	Macarthur	–	Wanderers			Campbelltown Sports Stadium	

== Shared player history ==
=== Players who have played for both clubs ===
Player	Macarthur FC seasons	Western Sydney Wanderers seasons
(Australia) Nicholas Suman	2020–2023	2016–2020
(Australia) Antony Golec	2020–2022	2014–2015
(Australia) Tomi Juric	2021–2022	2013–2015
(England) Jordon Mutch	2021–2022	2021
(Australia) Jonathan Aspropotamitis	2022–2023; 2026–	2015–2018
(Australia) Kearyn Baccus	2022–2024	2014–2018
(Australia) Ali Auglah	2022–2024	2020–2021
(Australia) Matthew Jurman	2023–2026	2019–2020
(Australia) Chris Ikonomidis	2024–2026	2017–2018
(Australia) Mitch Duke	2025–2026	2019–2020; 2021
(Scotland) Ryan Fraser	2026–Present	2026
(Australia) Kosta Grozos	2026–Present	2018–2021

=== Player speculations and signings ===
Both Macarthur FC and Western Sydney Wanderers have vied for player signatures in the past. Macarthur FC's captain, Mark Milligan, rejected an offer from the Wanderers and chose to sign with Macarthur instead. His decision was influenced by his relationship with Ante Milicic and the potential for a future coaching role. In early-2020, Matthew Jurman was four-months under contract with Western Sydney Wanderers before interests surfaced from overseas and other domestic clubs. Macarthur FC was reported to be in lengthy negotiations with Jurman despite Wanderers' efforts to extend his contract. Jurman eventually moved on to have spells with Greek club Xanthi and Newcastle Jets, before signing for Macarthur in June 2023.

On 5 December 2019, Macarthur FC declared their interest in Sydney FC midfielder Miloš Ninković, who had six months remaining on his contract. Despite expressing his desire to stay with Sydney FC, Ninković was given a two-week deadline by 5 p.m. to either extend his contract with Sydney FC or sign for Macarthur FC. Macarthur was reportedly offering multi-year contract, with an increased based salary, including a possible coaching role at the club if he was to retire. (Note: The Daily Telegraph reported that the initial offer for Ninković was a two-year contract with an option to extend, including a possible coaching role and a base salary of $750,000 – an increase of Sydney FC's offer of $500,000. The final offer made on 16 December 2019, and reported by SBS Sports, was for an increased base salary of $1.6 million under the same terms.) However, Ninković extended his contract with Sydney FC on 17 December 2019, before ultimately, signing for Western Sydney Wanderers on 3 July 2022 – less than two weeks after his release from Sydney FC.

== Honours ==
Competition	Macarthur FC	Western Sydney Wanderers
A-League Men Premiership	0	1 (2012–13)
A-League Men Championship	0	0
Australia Cup	2 (2022, 2024)	0
AFC Champions League	0	1 (2014)
Total	2	2

== See also ==
- Sydney Derby (A-League Men)
