= Alaat Abdul-Rahman =

Australian soccer player (born 2007)

Personal information
- Date of birth: 4 April 2007 (age 19)
- Place of birth: Sydney, New South Wales, Australia
- Height: 1.78 m (5 ft 10 in)
- Position: Forward

Team information
- Current team: Western Sydney Wanderers
- Number: 37

Youth career
- Enfield Rovers
- Inter Lions
- Sydney Olympic
- 2021–: Western Sydney Wanderers

Senior career*
Years	Team	Apps	(Gls)
2025–	Western Sydney Wanderers Youth	51	(8)
2025–	Western Sydney Wanderers	3	(0)

International career^{‡}
2025	Australia U18	2	(0)
2026–	Australia U20	2	(1)
- * Club domestic league appearances and goals as of 23 August 2026 ‡ National team caps and goals as of 6 September 2026

Alaat Abdul-Rahman (born 4 April 2007) is an Australian professional soccer player who plays as a forward for A-League club Western Sydney Wanderers.

== Early life and youth career ==
Abdul-Rahman began his football career with Enfield Rovers before spending time with Inter Lions, Sydney Olympic, and Western Sydney Wanderers. He joined the Western Sydney Wanderers academy at the age of 14 and progressed through the club's youth system.

== Club career ==
Abdul-Rahman progressed into the Western Sydney Wanderers' NPL NSW side during the 2025 season. He scored his first NPL goal of the campaign against NWS Spirit FC in March 2025 and also scored in a 3–0 victory over St George FC. He finished the 2025 NPL NSW season with 26 appearances and three goals.

Abdul-Rahman made his A-League debut on 16 February 2025, coming on as a substitute in Western Sydney's 2–1 victory over Macarthur FC. On 10 July, he signed a two-year scholarship deal with the club, keeping him at Western Sydney through the 2026–27 season.

During the 2026 NPL NSW season, Abdul-Rahman remained a regular member of the Wanderers' senior academy side. He scored in a 1–1 draw with NWS Spirit FC in April and in a 6–0 victory over Sydney FC in May, and scored again in a 2–1 victory over Sydney Olympic in July.

== International career ==
In December 2025, Abdul-Rahman was selected for the Australia national under-18 team for the 2025 SBS Cup in Japan. He made three appearances at the tournament, starting all three matches against Spain, Shizuoka, and Japan.

In August 2026, Abdul-Rahman was called up to the Australia national under-20 team for the 2027 AFC U-20 Asian Cup qualification phase in Vientiane, Laos.

== Personal life ==
Abdul-Rahman attended Endeavour Sports High School in Sydney, New South Wales.

== Career statistics ==
=== Club ===
As of match played 23 August 2026

Appearances and goals by club, season and competition
Club	Season	League			Australia Cup		Total	
Club	Season	Division	Apps	Goals	Apps	Goals	Apps	Goals
Western Sydney Wanderers Youth	2025	NPL NSW	26	3	—		26	3
Western Sydney Wanderers Youth	2026	NPL NSW	25	5	—		25	5
Western Sydney Wanderers Youth	Total		51	8	0	0	51	8
Western Sydney Wanderers	2024–25	A-League	1	0	—		1	0
Western Sydney Wanderers	2025–26	A-League	2	0	—		2	0
Western Sydney Wanderers	Total		3	0	0	0	3	0
Career total			54	8	0	0	54	8
