= Alexander Badolato =

Australian soccer player

Alex Badolato
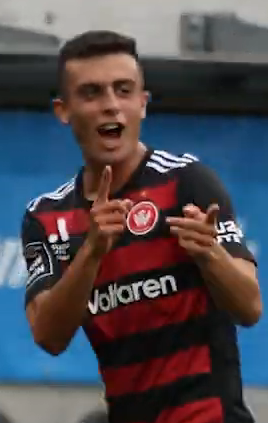
- Badolato playing for Western Sydney Wanderers in 2024

Personal information
- Full name: Alexander Phillip Badolato
- Date of birth: 23 February 2005 (age 21)
- Place of birth: Sydney, Australia
- Position: Attacking midfielder

Team information
- Current team: Newcastle Jets
- Number: 19

Youth career
- Sylvania Heights FC
- Sutherland Sharks
- 2018–2021: Western Sydney Wanderers

Senior career*
Years	Team	Apps	(Gls)
2021–2025	Western Sydney Wanderers NPL	69	(20)
2021–2025	Western Sydney Wanderers	20	(0)
2025	→ Melbourne Victory (loan)	9	(0)
2025–	Newcastle Jets	13	(4)

International career^{‡}
2023	Australia U18	3	(0)
2022–2025	Australia U20	25	(5)
Medal record
Men's football
Representing Australia
AFC U-20 Asian Cup
Winner	2025 China	Team
- * Club domestic league appearances and goals as of 15:17, 4 November 2026 ‡ National team caps and goals as of 4 November 2026

Alexander Phillip Badolato (Italian: [ba.doˈla.to]; born 23 February 2005) is an Australian professional football player who plays as an attacking midfielder for Newcastle Jets.

== Personal life ==
Alexander is the older brother of Nicholas badolato

== Club career ==
=== Western Sydney Wanderers ===
Raised in Western Sydney, Badolato signed for the Wanderers in 2018, initially playing for their under-13s before being promoted to their National Premier Leagues (NPL) squad in 2021. During his time at youth level, he was named the Under-14s' Player of the Year in 2019.

Badolato signed a two-year scholarship contract (his first professional deal) on 27 July 2021. Badolato made his starting debut in his maiden appearance for the first-team, aged 16, scoring in a 3–0 away cup victory over Broadmeadow Magic. After making eight appearances for the first-team, he extended his contract on a three-year full-time deal on 16 July 2023.

== International career ==
Badolato won the Best Player award at the 2025 U20 Asian Cup, in which he was part of Australia's winning team, the first time Australia had ever won the tournament.

== Career statistics ==
As of 4 November 2026

Appearances and goals by club, season and competition
Club	Season	League			Domestic Cup		Continental		Other		Total	
Club	Season	Division	Apps	Goals	Apps	Goals	Apps	Goals	Apps	Goals	Apps	Goals
Western Sydney Wanderers NPL	2021	NPL NSW 2	11	3	—		—		—		11	3
Western Sydney Wanderers NPL	2022	NSW League One	21	10	—		—		—		21	10
Western Sydney Wanderers NPL	2023	NPL NSW	25	4	—		—		—		25	4
Western Sydney Wanderers NPL	2024	NPL NSW	12	3	—		—		—		12	3
Western Sydney Wanderers NPL	Total		69	20	—		—		—		69	20
Western Sydney Wanderers	2021–22	A-League Men	2	0	2	1	—		—		4	1
Western Sydney Wanderers	2022–23	A-League Men	4	0	0	0	—		—		4	0
Western Sydney Wanderers	2023–24	A-League Men	12	0	0	0	—		—		12	0
Western Sydney Wanderers	2024–25	A-League Men	2	0	1	1	—		—		3	1
Western Sydney Wanderers	Total		20	0	3	2	—		—		23	2
Melbourne Victory FC (Loan)	2024–25	A-League Men	9	0	—		—		—		9	0
Newcastle Jets FC	2025-26	A-League Men	11	4	4	1	—		—		15	5
Newcastle Jets FC	2026–27	A-League Men	2	0	0	0	1	0	—		0	0
Newcastle Jets Total			13	4	4	1	1	0	0	0	18	5
Career total			111	24	7	3	1	0	—		119	27

== Honours ==
Newcastle Jets FC

- Australia Cup Champions: 2025
- A-League Premiership: 2025–26

Australia U-20

- AFC U-20 Asian Cup Champions: 2025

Individual

- AFC U-20 Asian Cup Best Player: 2025
- AFC Youth Player of the Year: 2025
- A-League Men Goal of the Month: October/November 2025
- Newcastle Jets FC A-League Men's Goal of the year 2025-26
