= Gabriel Cleur =

Australian footballer

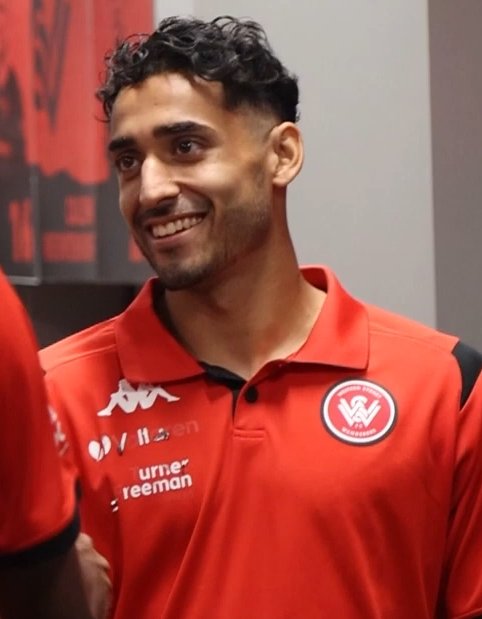
- Cleur with Western Sydney Wanderers in 2023

Personal information
- Full name: Gabriel Isaac Cleur
- Date of birth: 31 January 1998 (age 28)
- Place of birth: Sydney, New South Wales, Australia
- Height: 1.81 m (5 ft 11 in)
- Position: Right back

Youth career
- Marconi Stallions
- Western Sydney Wanderers
- 2015–2017: Virtus Entella

Senior career*
Years	Team	Apps	(Gls)
2016–2022	Virtus Entella	46	(1)
2018	→ Robur Siena (loan)	7	(0)
2019–2020	→ Alessandria (loan)	16	(0)
2022–2026	Western Sydney Wanderers	60	(1)

International career
2019–2021	Australia U23	8	(0)
Medal record
Men's football
Representing Australia
AFC U-23 Asian Cup
Third place	2020 Thailand	U-23 Team
- * Club domestic league appearances and goals

Gabriel Isaac Cleur (/klɜːr/ KLER, French: [klœʁ]; born 31 January 1998) is an Australian former professional soccer player who played as a right back for Virtus Entella, Siena, Alessandria, and Western Sydney Wanderers.

== Career ==
Cleur made his professional debut for Virtus Entella in the Serie B as a late substitute in the final round of the 2016–17 season. He signed a new contract with Entella in September 2017, extending to 2021.

In January 2018, Cleur moved on a six-month loan to Serie C side Robur Siena.

On 26 June 2019, he joined Alessandria on loan.

In June 2022, it was confirmed that Cleur would leave Virtus Entella to join A-League Men side Western Sydney Wanderers.

In January 2026, Cleur stepped away from professional football to focus on his education and career as a psychologist.

== Personal life ==
Cleur was born in Australia and is of Anglo-Indian and Italian descent.

== Career statistics ==
Appearances and goals by club, season and competition
Club	Season	League			Cup		Other		Total	
Club	Season	Division	Apps	Goals	Apps	Goals	Apps	Goals	Apps	Goals
Virtus Entella	2016–17	Serie B	1	0	0	0	0	0	1	0
Virtus Entella	2017–18	Serie B	0	0	0	0	0	0	0	0
Virtus Entella	2018–19	Serie C	5	0	4	0	0	0	9	0
Virtus Entella	2020–21	Serie B	17	0	2	0	0	0	19	0
Virtus Entella	2021–22	Serie C	23	1	0	0	1	0	24	1
Virtus Entella	Total		46	1	6	0	1	0	53	1
Robur Siena (loan)	2017–18	Serie C	7	0	0	0	0	0	7	0
Alessandria (loan)	2019–20	Serie C	16	0	1	0	0	0	0	0
Western Sydney Wanderers	2022–23	A-League Men	18	0	0	0	0	0	18	0
Western Sydney Wanderers	2023–24	A-League Men	13	0	3	0	0	0	16	0
Western Sydney Wanderers	2024–25	A-League Men	22	1	2	1	0	0	24	2
Western Sydney Wanderers	2025–26	A-League Men	7	0	1	0	0	0	8	0
Western Sydney Wanderers	Total		60	1	6	1	0	0	66	2
Career total			87	1	7	0	1	0	95	1

== Honours ==
Australia U-23

- AFC U-23 Asian Cup: 3rd place 2020

== See also ==
- List of foreign Serie B players
