= Western Sydney Wanderers FC Youth =

Western Sydney Wanderers Youth
- Full name: Western Sydney Wanderers Football Club (Youth)
- Nickname: Wanderers
- Short name: WSW
- Founded: 2012
- Ground: Wanderers Football Park (NPL)
- Capacity: 9,000
- Owner: Paul Lederer
- Chairman: Paul Lederer
- Head coach: Vacant
- League: National Premier Leagues NSW; A-League Youth
- 2026: 10th of 16
- Website: http://www.wswanderersfc.com.au/
Home colours	Away colours	Third colours

Western Sydney Wanderers Youth is the academy system of Western Sydney Wanderers Football Club based in Sydney, New South Wales, Australia. The team competes in the National Youth League competition known as the Y-League and also the National Premier Leagues NSW Men's First Grade, Under 20s and Under 18s competitions. For the 2020 season, they were to play in the NSW NPL 2 league. However, due to a delayed season and restart, they were promoted to the National Premier Leagues NSW.

In addition, the club submits teams into the Football NSW Boys’ Youth Competitions at U13, U14, U15 and U16 level.

== Youth team history ==
The team was founded in 2012, as a Western Sydney Wanderers representative team for the National Youth League competition, replacing the defunct Gold Coast United. In 2016 the team was admitted to the National Premier Leagues NSW.

== 2024 Youth squad ==
As of 3 March 2024

Note: Flags indicate national team as defined under FIFA eligibility rules; some limited exceptions apply. Players may hold more than one non-FIFA nationality.

No.	Pos.	Nation	Player
1	GK	AUS	Taiga Harper
2	DF	AUS	Nathan Barrie
3	DF	AUS	Anthony Pantazopoulos
4	DF	AUS	Doni Grdić
6	MF	MLT	Dylan Scicluna
8	MF	AUS	Oscar Priestman
7	MF	AUS	Marcus Younis
9	FW	AUS	Nathanael Blair
10	FW	AUS	Alexander Badolato
11	MF	AUS	Adam Bugarija
12	FW	AUS	Zac Sapsford
13	FW	AUS	Aydan Hammond
15	DF	AUS	Luca Peroca
16	DF	AUS	Roman Culina
17	FW	AUS	Filip Dimovski
18	DF	AUS	Jok Akuien
19	FW	AUS	Max Hately

No.	Pos.	Nation	Player
20	GK	AUS	Lucas Sinnott
22	DF	AUS	Jesse Cameron
23	MF	AUS	Mason Fernandez
77	MF	AUS	Philip Gigliotti
99	DF	AUS	Ryan Devine
—	MF	AUS	Ryley Hollingdale
—	MF	AUS	Yannis Frerck
—	FW	AUS	Farah Koko
—	MF	AUS	Luke Nieuwenhof
—	MF	AUS	Edmun Haddad
—	MF	AUS	William Loucas
—	DF	AUS	Will Mckay
—	DF	AUS	Yohan D'Souza
—	DF	AUS	Thomas Furlong
—	DF	AUS	Alex Bonetig
—	DF	AUS	William Freney
—	MF	AUS	Matthew O’Donoghue

== Facilities ==
The Wanderers training facility & academy is located at the Wanderers Centre of Football in Rooty Hill. The team plays in Wanderers Football Park.

== Honours ==
- Y-League/A-League Youth Premiership
  - Premiers (2): 2017–18, 2018–19
  - Runners-up (1): 2016–17
- Y-League/A-League Youth Championship
  - Champions (1): 2017–18
  - Runners-up (1): 2018–19
- NSW NPL 2/NSW League One Premiership
  - Runners-up (1): 2016
- NSW NPL 2/NSW League One Championship
  - Runners-up (1): 2016

== See also ==
- Western Sydney Wanderers FC
- Western Sydney Wanderers FC (W-League)
