= 2021–22 Western Sydney Wanderers FC season =

Western Sydney Wanderers
2021–22 season
- Chairman: Paul Lederer
- Manager: Carl Robinson (to 30 January 2022); Marko Rudan (from 31 January 2022)
- Stadium: CommBank Stadium, Parramatta
- A-League Men: 10th
- FFA Cup: Round of 16 (2021)
- Australia Cup: Play-off (2022)
- Top goalscorer: League: Tomer Hemed (6 goals); All: Tomer Hemed (6 goals)
- Highest home attendance: 23,118 (20 November 2021 vs. Sydney FC
- Lowest home attendance: 3,767 (20 April 2022 vs. Newcastle Jets FC
- Average home league attendance: 7,381
Home colours	Away colours	Third colours

The 2021–22 Western Sydney Wanderers season was the club's tenth season since its establishment in 2012, and participated in the A-League Men for the tenth time.

On 30 January 2022, it was announced that manager Carl Robinson had been sacked. The following day, Marko Rudan was appointed as manager until the end of the season.

== Players ==
As of 18 November 2021

Note: Flags indicate national team as defined under FIFA eligibility rules; some limited exceptions apply. Players may hold more than one non-FIFA nationality.

No.	Pos.	Nation	Player
1	GK	AUS	Daniel Margush
2	DF	SCO	Ziggy Gordon
3	DF	CIV	Adama Traoré
4	DF	AUS	Rhys Williams (captain)
5	MF	ENG	Jack Rodwell
6	DF	AUS	Tass Mourdoukoutas
7	MF	AUS	Ramy Najjarine
8	MF	AUS	Steven Ugarkovic
9	FW	AUS	Bernie Ibini
10	FW	ISR	Tomer Hemed
11	FW	JPN	Keijiro Ogawa (on loan from Yokohama FC)
13	DF	AUS	Tate Russell
14	MF	AUS	James Troisi
15	DF	AUS	Tomislav Mrcela (injury replacement)
17	MF	AUS	Keanu Baccus

No.	Pos.	Nation	Player
19	DF	AUS	Daniel Wilmering
20	GK	ESP	Tomás Mejías
21	FW	AUS	Jordan Swibel (scholarship)
22	DF	AUS	John Koutroumbis
23	FW	AUS	Dimitri Petratos (on loan from Al Wehda)
25	DF	AUS	Phillip Cancar
29	MF	AUS	Terry Antonis
32	MF	AUS	Jarrod Carluccio (scholarship)
33	DF	AUS	Mark Natta (scholarship)
35	DF	AUS	Nectar Triantis (scholarship)
36	MF	AUS	Alessandro Lopane (scholarship)
37	FW	AUS	Alexander Badolato (scholarship)
39	DF	AUS	Thomas Aquilina (scholarship)
—	GK	AUS	Vedran Janjetovic

== Transfers ==
=== Transfers in ===
No.	Position	Name	Transferred from	Type/fee	Contract length	Date	Ref
3	DF	(Ivory Coast) Adama Traoré	Melbourne Victory	Free transfer	2 years	18 June 2021	
7	MF	Ramy Najjarine	Melbourne City	Free transfer	1 year	30 June 2021	
10	FW	(Israel) Tomer Hemed	Wellington Phoenix	Free transfer	1 year	11 July 2021	
4	DF	Rhys Williams	(Saudi Arabia) Al Qadsiah	Free transfer	2 years	18 July 2021	
29	MF	Terry Antonis	(South Korea) Suwon Samsung Bluewings	Free transfer	3 years	25 July 2021	
22	DF	John Koutroumbis	Unattached	Free transfer	2 years	26 July 2021	
23	FW	Dimitri Petratos	(Saudi Arabia) Al Wehda	Loan	1 year	8 August 2021	
11	FW	(Japan) Keijiro Ogawa	(Japan) Yokohama FC	Loan	1 year	15 October 2021	
20	GK	(Spain) Tomás Mejías	(Turkey) Ankaraspor	Free transfer	1 year	18 October 2021	
21	FW	Jordan Swibel	Unattached	Scholarship	1 year	28 October 2021	
5	MF	(England) Jack Rodwell	Unattached	Free transfer	1 year	18 November 2021	
15	DF	Tomislav Mrcela	Unattached	Injury replacement	4 months	17 February 2022	

==== From youth squad ====
N	Pos.	Nat.	Name	Age	Notes
37	FW	(Australia)	Alexander Badolato	16	2 year scholarship contract
35	DF	(Australia)	Nectar Triantis	18	2 year scholarship contract

=== Transfers out ===
No.	Position	Player	Transferred to	Type/fee	Date	Ref
23	MF	Kosta Grozos	Unattached	End of contract	25 June 2021	
27	FW	(Germany) Nicolai Müller	Unattached	End of contract	25 June 2021	
34	DF	(Germany) Patrick Ziegler	Unattached	End of contract	25 June 2021	
40	GK	Noah James	Newcastle Jets	End of loan	25 June 2021	
77	FW	Scott McDonald	Unattached	End of contract	25 June 2021	
—	DF	Mohamed Al-Taay	Unattached	End of contract	25 June 2021	
12	FW	Mitchell Duke	(Saudi Arabia) Al-Taawoun	End of loan	30 June 2021	
18	MF	(Scotland) Graham Dorrans	Unattached	Mutual contract termination	6 July 2021	
7	FW	Bruce Kamau	(Greece) OFI Crete	End of contract	11 July 2021	
4	DF	Dylan McGowan	(Scotland) Kilmarnock	Mutual contract termination	14 July 2021	
19	MF	(England) Jordon Mutch	Macarthur FC	End of contract	23 July 2021	
27	FW	Kwame Yeboah	Retired	End of contract	16 October 2021	

=== Contract extensions ===
No.	Name	Position	Duration	Date	Notes
26	Jarrod Carluccio	Full-back	1 year	27 July 2021	extension of scholarship contract
25	Phillip Cancar	Defender	1 year	8 November 2021	

== Pre-season and friendlies ==
23 October 2021	Western Sydney Wanderers	2–0	Central Coast Mariners	Sydney, Australia
	Aquilina 58'; Swibel 76'	Report		Stadium: Wanderers Football Park; Attendance: 0 (behind closed doors)
Note: The two teams played for an extra 30 minutes after the match with no more goals scored

30 October 2021	Western Sydney Wanderers	3–2	Macarthur FC
19:00	Ibini 17'; Hemed 36'; Russell 71'	Report	Dávila 18'; Meredith 48'	Attendance: 0 (behind closed doors)

2 November 2021	Blacktown City (New South Wales)	3–3	Western Sydney Wanderers
19:00	Mendy; Shabow; O'Brien	Report	Petratos; Mourdoukoutas; Badolato	Attendance: 0 (behind closed doors)

6 November 2021	Western Sydney Wanderers	1–2	Wellington Phoenix	Sydney, Australia
18:00 AEDT	Najjarine 32'	Report	Ball 5'; Elliot 71'	Stadium: Wanderers Football Park; Attendance: 0 (Member's Only)

13 November 2021	Western Sydney Wanderers	3–1	(New South Wales) APIA Leichhardt
18:05	Wilmering; Lopane	Report	Ucchino	Attendance: 0 (behind closed doors)

== Competitions ==
Win Draw Loss Cancelled or postponed

=== Overview ===
Competition	Record							
Competition	P	W	D	L	GF	GA	GD	Win %
A-League	26	6	9	11	30	38	−8	23.08
2021 FFA Cup	2	1	0	1	4	2	+2	50.00
2022 Australia Cup	1	0	0	1	1	3	−2	0.00
Total	29	7	9	13	35	43	−8	24.14

Updated to match played 13 May 2022
Source: Competitions

=== FFA Cup ===
10 November 2021 Round of 32	Broadmeadow Magic (New South Wales)	0–3	Western Sydney Wanderers	Newcastle
19:30 AEDT		Report	Ibini 26'; Badolato 47'; Ugarkovic 51'	Stadium: No. 2 Sportsground; Attendance: 892; Referee: Hassan Jomaa

7 December 2021 Round of 16	APIA Leichhardt (New South Wales)	2–1	Western Sydney Wanderers	Sydney
19:30 AEDT	Romero 27'; Diaz 61'	Report	Mourdoukoutas 70'	Stadium: Leichhardt Oval; Attendance: 4,171; Referee: Alex King

=== Australia Cup ===
13 May 2022 Preliminary Rounds	Western Sydney Wanderers	1–3	Brisbane Roar	Sydney
19:30 AEST	Carluccio 8'	Report	Dehmie 51'; Ivanovic 58', 75'	Stadium: Wanderers Football Park; Attendance: 824; Referee: Kurt Ams

=== A-League ===
==== League table ====
Pos	Team	Pld	W	D	L	GF	GA	GD	Pts	Qualification
8	Sydney FC	26	8	7	11	37	44	−7	31	
9	Newcastle Jets	26	8	5	13	45	43	+2	29	Qualification for 2022 Australia Cup play-offs (Note: The top 8 teams qualify for the round of 32, while the bottom four teams participate in a play-off round.)
10	Western Sydney Wanderers	26	6	9	11	30	38	−8	27	Qualification for 2022 Australia Cup play-offs
11	Brisbane Roar	26	7	5	14	29	39	−10	26	Qualification for 2022 Australia Cup play-offs
12	Perth Glory	26	4	6	16	20	43	−23	18	Qualification for 2022 Australia Cup play-offs

Source: A-Leagues
Rules for classification: 1) Points; 2) Goal difference; 3) Goals scored; 4) Points per game; 5) Least red cards; 6) Least yellow cards; 7) Toss of a coin in an event of a tie of two clubs.

==== Matches ====
The opening six rounds of the 2021–22 A-League were announced on 23 September 2021. The remaining rounds were released on 29 October 2021.

20 November 2021 1	Western Sydney Wanderers	0–0	Sydney FC	Sydney
19:45 AEDT		Report		Stadium: CommBank Stadium; Attendance: 23,118; Referee: Alex King

28 November 2021 2	Western Sydney Wanderers	2–2	Newcastle Jets	Sydney
18:15 AEDT	Ibini 42'; Hemed 49'	Report	Mikeltadze 19' (pen.); Boumal 52'	Stadium: CommBank Stadium; Attendance: 8,003; Referee: Ben Abraham

3 December 2021 3	Wellington Phoenix	0–2	Western Sydney Wanderers	Wollongong
19:45 AEDT		Report	Hemed 66'; Koutrombis 90+3'	Stadium: WIN Stadium; Attendance: 1,948; Referee: Stephen Lucas

11 December 2021 4	Western Sydney Wanderers	0–2	Macarthur FC	Sydney
19:45 AEDT		Report	Uskok 64'; Hollman 74'	Stadium: CommBank Stadium; Attendance: 8,910; Referee: Chris Beath

18 December 2021 5	Central Coast Mariners	2–0	Western Sydney Wanderers	Gosford
17:05 AEDT	Goddard 59'; Bozanic 90+7'	Report		Stadium: Central Coast Stadium; Attendance: 4,389; Referee: Lachlan Keevers

9 January 2022 26	Melbourne City	3–3	Western Sydney Wanderers	Melbourne
18:45	Petratos 16' (o.g.); Maclaren 36'; Tilio 60'	Report	Troisi 5'; Rodwell 68'; Ogawa 68'	Stadium: AAMI Park; Attendance: 3,376; Referee: Alex King

29 January 2022 12	Brisbane Roar	3–0	Western Sydney Wanderers	Brisbane
18:45 AEST	Mileusnic 27', 65'; Akbari 74'	Report		Stadium: Moreton Daily Stadium; Attendance: 5,137; Referee: Lachlan Keevers

2 February 2022 9	Western Sydney Wanderers	1–0	Perth Glory	Sydney
19:45 AEDT	Rodwell 26'	Report		Stadium: CommBank Stadium; Attendance: 4,124; Referee: Alireza Faghani

5 February 2022 7	Western Sydney Wanderers	0–1	Western United	Sydney
17:05 AEDT		Report	Prijović 29'	Stadium: CommBank Stadium; Attendance: 5,987; Referee: Jack Morgan

11 February 2022 14	Western Sydney Wanderers	1–3	Melbourne City	Sydney
19:45 AEDT	Petratos 80' (pen.)	Report	Leckie 36', 43'; Berenguer 64'	Stadium: CommBank Stadium; Attendance: 4,515; Referee: Alex King

16 February 2022 10	Western Sydney Wanderers	2–0	Melbourne Victory	Sydney
19:55 AEDT	Russell 55'; Petratos 80' (pen.)	Report		Stadium: CommBank Stadium; Attendance: 4,321; Referee: Alireza Faghani

20 February 2022 15	Western United	3–2	Western Sydney Wanderers	Melbourne
18:35 AEDT	Prijović 27'; Garuccio 45', 68'	Report	Hemed 51' (pen.); Ugarkovic 86'	Stadium: AAMI Park; Attendance: 3,200; Referee: Ben Abraham

23 February 2022 6	Newcastle Jets	1–0	Western Sydney Wanderers	Newcastle
19:55 AEDT	Thurgate 61'	Report		Stadium: McDonald Jones Stadium; Attendance: 3,581; Referee: Alireza Faghani

5 March 2022 17	Western Sydney Wanderers	2–0	Sydney FC	Sydney
19:45 AEDT	Hemed 37' (pen.); Baccus 52'	Report		Stadium: CommBank Stadium; Attendance: 14,002; Referee: Alex King

12 March 2022 18	Macarthur FC	3–1	Western Sydney Wanderers	Sydney
19:45 AEDT	Noone 8'; Dávila 73', 90' (pen.)	Report	Antonis 80'	Stadium: Campbelltown Stadium; Attendance: 5,203; Referee: Adam Kersey

16 March 2022 8	Adelaide United	1–2	Western Sydney Wanderers	Adelaide
19:15 ACDT	Goodwin 8'	Report	Najjarine 26'; Cancar 75'	Stadium: Coopers Stadium; Attendance: 3,553; Referee: Danel Elder

20 March 2022 19	Western Sydney Wanderers	0–0	Adelaide United	Sydney
18:15 AEDT		Report		Stadium: CommBank Stadium; Attendance: 5,077; Referee: Tim Danaskos

27 March 2022 20	Melbourne Victory	1–1	Western Sydney Wanderers	Melbourne
18:05 AEDT	Davidson 90+1'	Report	Ugarkovic 90+6' (pen.)	Stadium: AAMI Park; Attendance: 6,014; Referee: Shaun Evans

2 April 2022 24	Sydney FC	3–2	Western Sydney Wanderers	Sydney
19:45 AEDT	Le Fondre 2'; Buhagiar 66', 71'	Report	Hemed 17'; Russell 75'	Stadium: Netstrata Jubilee Stadium; Attendance: 10,091; Referee: Alireza Faghani

9 April 2022 23	Western Sydney Wanderers	1–1	Brisbane Roar	Sydney
17:05 AEST	Hingert 41' (o.g.)	Report	O'Shea 90+2' (pen.)	Stadium: CommBank Stadium; Attendance: 5,233; Referee: Jack Morgan

13 April 2022 13	Western Sydney Wanderers	2–2	Central Coast Mariners	Sydney
19:05 AEST	Rowles 41' (o.g.); Petratos 54'	Report	Nkololo 64' (pen.); Hall 90+5'	Stadium: CommBank Stadium; Attendance: 4,212; Referee: Ben Abraham

20 April 2022 22	Western Sydney Wanderers	3–2	Newcastle Jets	Sydney
19:45 AEST	Ugarkovic 6'; Rodwell 18'; Najjarine 21'	Report	Hoffman 67'; Silvera 75'	Stadium: CommBank Stadium; Attendance: 3,767; Referee: Tim Danaskos

24 April 2022 25	Wellington Phoenix	1–0	Western Sydney Wanderers	Auckland
15:05 NZST	Waine 22'	Report		Stadium: Eden Park; Attendance: 15,245; Referee: Jonathon Bareiro

1 May 2022 21	Perth Glory	1–1	Western Sydney Wanderers	Perth
19:05 AWST	Fornaroli 18'	Report	Ogawa 78'	Stadium: HBF Park; Attendance: 6,893; Referee: Casey Reibelt

5 May 2022 16	Western Sydney Wanderers	1–2	Wellington Phoenix	Sydney
19:05 AEST	Hemed 29'	Report	Sutton 3'; Piscopo 65'	Stadium: CommBank Stadium; Attendance: 4,769; Referee: Stephen Lucas

8 May 2022 11	Macarthur FC	1–1	Western Sydney Wanderers	Sydney
16:05 AEST	Juric 55' (pen.)	Report	Carluccio 10'	Stadium: Campbelltown Stadium; Referee: Casey Reibelt

== Statistics ==
=== Appearances and goals ===
Appearances as substitutes in brackets. Players with no appearances not included in the list.

As of 13 May 2022

No.	Pos.	Nat.	Name	A-League		2021 FFA Cup		2022 Australia Cup play-off		Total	
No.	Pos.	Nat.	Name	Apps	Goals	Apps	Goals	Apps	Goals	Apps	Goals
1	GK	(Australia)	Daniel Margush	14	0	1	0	0	0	15	0
2	DF	(Scotland)	Ziggy Gordon	6(6)	0	1	0	1	0	14	0
3	DF	(Ivory Coast)	Adama Traoré	23(1)	0	1	0	1	0	26	0
4	DF	(Australia)	Rhys Williams	6	0	1	0	0	0	7	0
5	MF	(England)	Jack Rodwell	10 (4)	3	0	0	0(1)	0	15	3
6	DF	(Australia)	Tass Mourdoukoutas	1(5)	0	1	1	0(1)	0	8	1
7	MF	(Australia)	Ramy Najjarine	14 (8)	2	2	0	1	0	25	2
8	MF	(Australia)	Steven Ugarkovic	22 (4)	3	1 (1)	1	1	0	29	4
9	FW	(Australia)	Bernie Ibini	10 (10)	1	1	1	0(1)	0	22	2
10	FW	(Israel)	Tomer Hemed	13 (7)	6	0	0	0(1)	0	21	6
11	FW	(Japan)	Keijiro Ogawa	17 (9)	2	0 (2)	0	0(1)	0	29	2
13	DF	(Australia)	Tate Russell	13 (7)	2	1 (1)	0	1	0	23	2
14	MF	(Australia)	James Troisi	16 (1)	1	1	0	1	0	19	1
15	DF	(Australia)	Tomislav Mrcela	12	0	0	0	0	0	12	0
17	MF	(Australia)	Keanu Baccus	20	1	0	0	1	0	21	1
19	DF	(Australia)	Daniel Wilmering	0	0	1	0	0	0	1	0
20	GK	(Spain)	Tomás Mejías	12(1)	0	1	0	1	0	15	0
21	FW	(Australia)	Jordan Swibel	0 (2)	0	0 (2)	0	0	0	4	0
22	DF	(Australia)	Johnny Koutroumbis	16 (1)	1	1	0	1	0	19	1
23	MF	(Australia)	Dimitri Petratos	15 (8)	3	1 (1)	0	0	0	25	3
25	DF	(Australia)	Phillip Cancar	10 (2)	1	1	0	0	0	13	1
29	MF	(Australia)	Terry Antonis	12 (9)	1	1	0	0	0	22	1
32	MF	(Australia)	Jarrod Carluccio	2 (7)	1	0	0	1	1	10	2
33	DF	(Australia)	Mark Natta	3 (1)	0	1	0	0	0	5	0
35	DF	(Australia)	Nectarios Triantis	0 (1)	0	0	0	0	0	1	0
36	MF	(Australia)	Alessandro Lopane	5 (7)	0	1 (1)	0	0(1)	0	15	0
37	FW	(Australia)	Alexander Badolato	0 (2)	0	2	1	0	0	4	1
38	DF	(Australia)	Isaac Hovar	0 (1)	0	0	0	0	0	1	0
39	DF	(Australia)	Thomas Aquilina	14(3)	0	1 (1)	0	0	0	19	0

=== Disciplinary record ===
As of 5 February 2021

Rank	No.	Pos	Nat	Name	A-League		FFA Cup		Total	
Rank	No.	Pos	Nat	Name	Booked	Sent off (straight red)	Booked	Sent off (straight red)	Booked	Sent off (straight red)
1	4	DF	(Australia)	Rhys Williams	4	0	0	0	4	0
2	2	DF	(Scotland)	Ziggy Gordon	1	0	1	0	2	0
2	3	DF	(Ivory Coast)	Adama Traoré	2	0	0	0	2	0
2	5	MF	(Australia)	Jack Rodwell	2	0	0	0	2	0
2	29	MF	(Australia)	Terry Antonis	1	0	1	0	2	0
2	39	DF	(Australia)	Thomas Aquilina	2	0	0	0	2	0
3	9	FW	(Australia)	Bernie Ibini	1	0	0	0	1	0
3	14	MF	(Australia)	James Troisi	0	0	1	0	1	0
3	22	DF	(Australia)	Johnny Koutroumbis	1	0	0	0	1	0
3	23	MF	(Australia)	Dimitri Petratos	1	0	0	0	1	0

=== Clean sheets ===
As of 13 May 2022

Rank	No.	Pos	Nat	Name	A-League	FFA Cup	Total
1	20	GK	(Spain)	Tomás Mejías	3	1	4
2	1	GK	(Australia)	Daniel Margush	3	0	3
