= Dean Pelekanos =

Australian soccer player (born 2001)

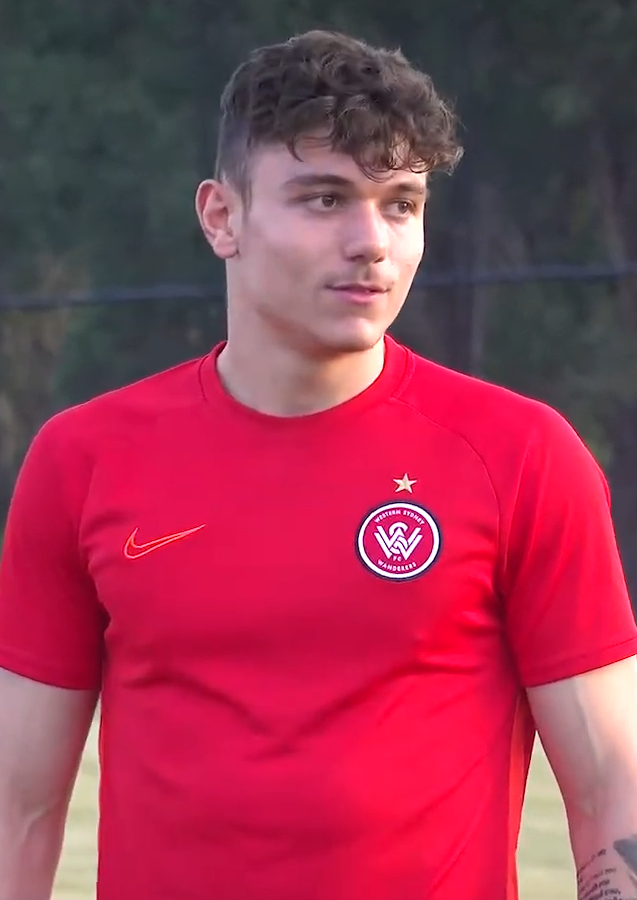
- Pelekanos with Western Sydney Wanderers in 2020.

Personal information
- Full name: Dean Pelekanos
- Date of birth: 5 January 2001 (age 25)
- Place of birth: Sydney, Australia
- Position: Midfielder

Team information
- Current team: Rockdale Ilinden
- Number: 14

Youth career
- 2012–2018: Blacktown City
- 2019–2020: Western Sydney Wanderers

Senior career*
| Years | Team | Apps | (Gls) |
| 2019–2022 | Western Sydney Wanderers NPL | 21 | (2) |
| 2023 | St George City | 27 | (2) |
| 2024 | Rockdale Ilinden | 29 | (2) |
| 2024–2025 | Western Sydney Wanderers | 14 | (0) |
| 2025–2026 | Sabah | 28 | (0) |
| 2026– | Rockdale Ilinden | 5 | (0) |
- * Club domestic league appearances and goals as of 8 August 2026

Dean Pelekanos (born 5 January 2001) is an Australian professional soccer player who plays as a midfielder for National Premier Leagues NSW club Rockdale Ilinden.

== Early life ==
Pelekanos was born in Sydney and raised in Glenwood, New South Wales. He piqued interest in football at the age of three and became a foundation member of Western Sydney Wanderers when he was eleven. Pelekanos attended Parklea Public School before being enrolled at Hills Sports High School, where he also played rugby league. Outside of football, Pelekanos is a music enthusiasts and raps in his free time.

== Career ==
Pelekanos began his football career, initially as a centre back, with Blacktown City in their under-12s and progressed through their youth ranks until his departure from the under-17s. He joined Western Sydney Wanderers Youth in 2019, where he was named captain in their National Premier Leagues squad.

After helping the Wanderers to promotion from NSW League Two, Pelekanos signed for newly-promoted St George City prior to the 2023 season.
