= Nicolas Milanovic =

Australian soccer player (born 2001)

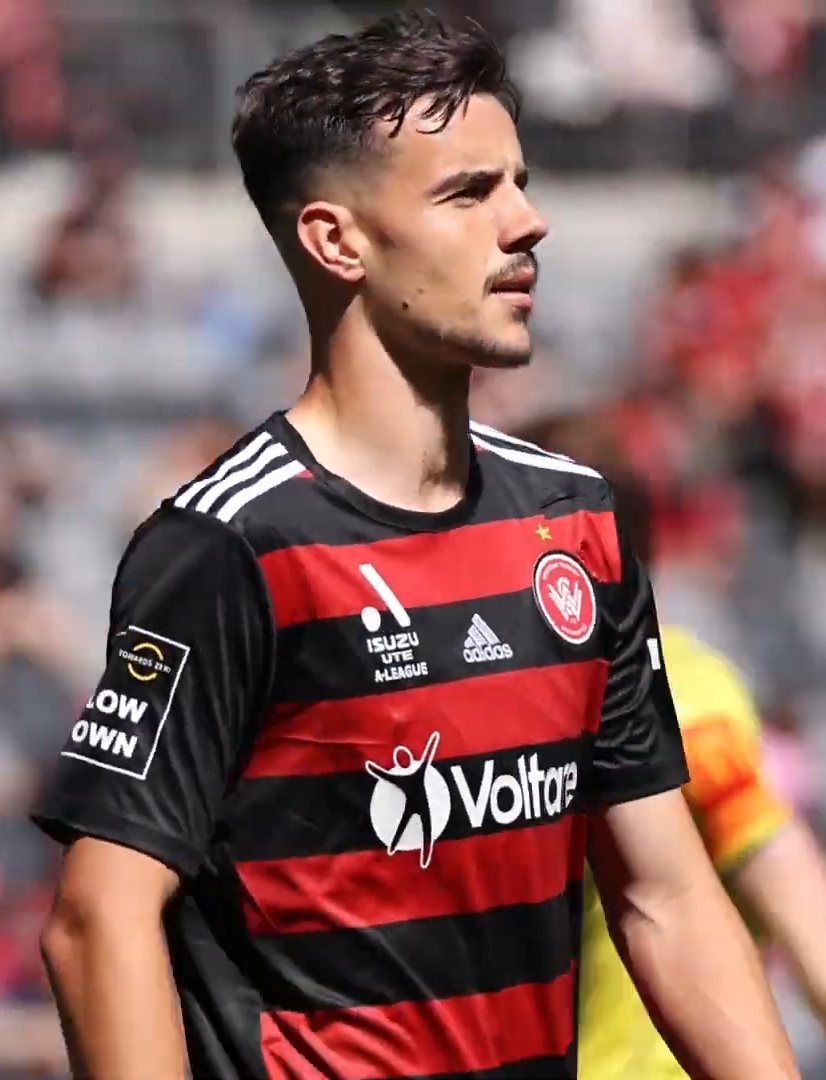
- Milanovic playing for Western Sydney Wanderers in 2023

Personal information
- Date of birth: 14 November 2001 (age 24)
- Place of birth: Penrith, New South Wales, Australia
- Height: 1.85 m (6 ft 1 in)
- Position: Winger

Team information
- Current team: Western Sydney Wanderers
- Number: 14

Youth career
- Sydney United 58
- Western Sydney Wanderers

Senior career*
Years	Team	Apps	(Gls)
2020	St Albans Dinamo	3	(0)
2020–2023	Western United	36	(5)
2021–2023	Western United NPL	10	(6)
2023	Western Sydney Wanderers NPL	5	(4)
2023–2025	Western Sydney Wanderers	68	(24)
2025–2026	Aberdeen	15	(0)
2026–	Western Sydney Wanderers	0	(0)

International career^{‡}
2024	Australia U23	2	(0)
2025–	Australia	2	(0)
Medal record
Men's football
Representing Australia
WAFF U-23 Championship
Runner-up	2024
- * Club domestic league appearances and goals as of 20 May 2026 ‡ National team caps and goals as of 9 September 2025

Nicolas Milanovic (Croatian: [nǐkolas milǎnoʋitɕ] NEE-koh-lahs mee-LAH-no-vich; born 14 November 2001) is an Australian professional football player who plays as a winger for A-League Men club Western Sydney Wanderers and the Australia national team.

== Club career ==
=== Western United ===
Milanovic began his professional career at Western United, joining the club in a COVID-19 pandemic enforced hub in New South Wales in 2020. Milanovic made 36 appearances for Western United before departing the club mid-way through the 2022–23 season, citing his intention to return to Sydney.

=== Western Sydney Wanderers ===
Within minutes of publicly departing Western United, it was announced that Milanovic had joined Western Sydney Wanderers. Milanovic made his debut coming off the bench in a 0–1 loss to Sydney FC. He scored his first goal for the club in a 2–3 loss to Melbourne City.

Having come off the bench in every game that he played in last season, Milanovic was handed a starting role for the Wanderers in the 2023–24 season playing in all but two matches as he was called up for Olyroos duty. Milanovic finished the season as the club's top scorer tied with Lachlan Brook, having both scored nine goals. Thanks to his good performances over the season, Milanovic signed a one-year contract extension with the Wanderers keeping him at the club until 2026, despite rumours of a transfer to Dinamo Zagreb in Croatia.

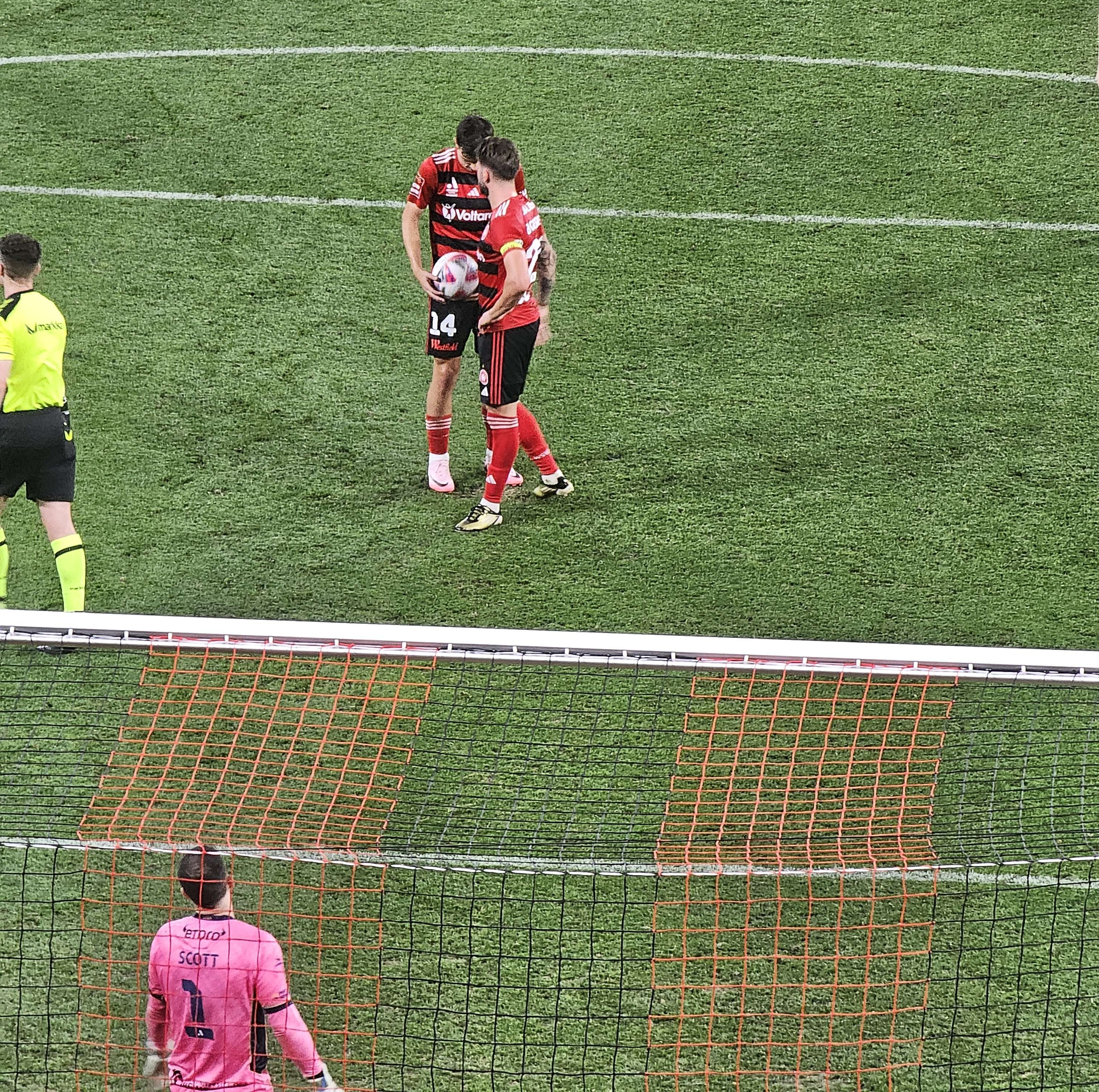
Nicolas Milanovic before his penalty to score a hat-trick.

On 8 September 2024, Milanovic scored his first professional hat-trick against the Newcastle Jets in a 4–1 win. Milanovic finished the 2024–25 season as runner-up behind joint winners of the Golden Boot, kicking 12 goals for the season.

=== Aberdeen ===
On 15 May 2025, Milanovic signed for Scottish Premiership club Aberdeen for an undisclosed fee, reported to be the highest in Western Sydney's history.

=== Return to Western Sydney Wanderers ===
On 24 July 2026, Milanovic returned to the Western Sydney Wanderers for an undisclosed fee. His first appearance following his return came in the round of 16 of the Australia Cup against Melbourne Victory at Marconi Stadium. He came off the bench as a substitute for Miguel Di Pizio and scored an equaliser in extra time with a free kick, sending the match to a penalty shoot-out. Milanovic converted his penalty, but the Wanderers were defeated 3–2 on penalties.

== International career ==
In 2024, Milanovic made two appearances for Australia's under-23 team.

Shortly following his transfer to Aberdeen, Milanovic was included in Australia's training squad under coach Tony Popovic. The training camp in United Arab Emirates comes weeks before the final games of the third round of 2026 World Cup qualification.

Milanovic was selected in the squad for the 2025 Soccer Ashes series against New Zealand. On 5 September 2025, he made his debut coming on as a substitute in the second half.

== Personal life ==
Born in Australia, Milanovic is of Croatian descent.

== Career statistics ==
=== Club ===
As of match played 8 August 2026

Appearances and goals by club, season and competition
Club	Season	League			National cup (Note: Includes Australia Cup)		League cup (Note: Includes Scottish League Cup)		Continental (Note: Includes Europa League)		Total	
Club	Season	Division	Apps	Goals	Apps	Goals	Apps	Goals	Apps	Goals	Apps	Goals
Western Sydney Wanderers	2022–23	A-League Men	27	5	0	0	–		–		27	5
Western Sydney Wanderers	2023–24	A-League Men	25	9	2	0	–		–		27	9
Western Sydney Wanderers	2024–25	A-League Men	26	12	3	2	–		–		29	14
Western Sydney Wanderers	Total		78	26	5	2	–		–		83	28
Aberdeen	2025–26	Scottish Premiership	5	0	0	0	1	0	2	0	8	0
Western Sydney Wanderers	2026–27	A-League Men	0	0	1	1	–		–		1	1
Career total			83	26	6	3	1	0	2	0	92	29

=== International ===
As of match played 9 September 2025

Appearances and goals by year
National team	Year	Apps	Goals
Australia U23	2023	3	0
Total		3	0
Australia	2025	2	0
Total		2	0

== Honours ==
Australia U23

- WAFF U-23 Championship runner-up: 2024

Individual

- Johnny Warren Medal: 2024–25
- A-League Men PFA Team of the Season: 2024–25
- Western Sydney Wanderers FC Player of the Year: 2025
- A-Leagues All Star: 2024
