= Aydan Hammond =

Australian soccer player (born 2003)

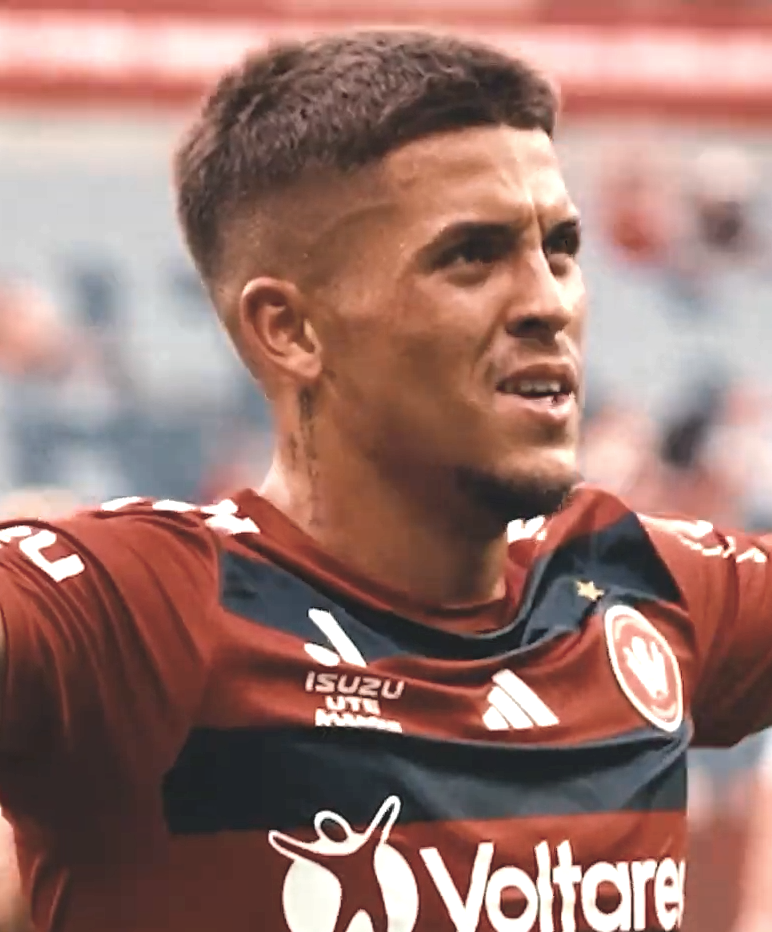
- Hammond with Western Sydney Wanderers in 2024

Personal information
- Full name: Aydan Johnathan Hammond
- Date of birth: 23 December 2003 (age 22)
- Place of birth: Westmead, Australia
- Position: Winger

Team information
- Current team: Western Sydney Wanderers
- Number: 7

Youth career
- 2012–2020: Belenenses
- 2020–2023: Central Coast Mariners
- 2023–2024: Western Sydney Wanderers

Senior career*
Years	Team	Apps	(Gls)
2023	Central Coast Mariners NPL	20	(8)
2024–	Western Sydney Wanderers NPL	13	(6)
2024–	Western Sydney Wanderers	37	(6)

International career^{‡}
2025–	Australia U23	4	(1)
- * Club domestic league appearances and goals as of 27 December 2025 ‡ National team caps and goals as of 7 September 2025

Aydan Johnathan Hammond (born 23 December 2003) is an Australian professional soccer player who plays as a winger for Western Sydney Wanderers.

== Club career ==
As a teenager, Hammond spent eight years at Belenenses, playing in their academy.

On 18 January 2024, Hammond signed for Western Sydney Wanderers on a scholarship contract. He made his A-League debut for the Wanderers in a 4–3 loss against Macarthur on 4 February 2024. His first goal then came in the Wanderers' 4–3 win over Melbourne Victory on 27 April 2024, scoring the equalising third goal in the side's last match of the season.

Following a promising first season, Hammond signed a two-year scholarship extension on 23 May 2024. On 19 October 2024, in the club's opening game of the 2024–25 season, Hammond scored an equaliser in the Sydney Derby against Sydney FC as the Wanderers eventually lost 2–1. He later scored a double on 2 March 2025 in an impressive display against Perth Glory.

== International career ==
Hammond attended an Australia under-17s camp as a 14 year old. Through his mother, he is also eligible to represent Peru, which he has previously expressed an interest in doing.

== Personal life ==
He has an older brother, Tristan Hammond, who represented Australia at the 2019 FIFA U-17 World Cup.

In addition to his native English, he can also speak Spanish and Portuguese fluently.
