= Anthony Pantazopoulos =

Australian football player

Anthony Pantazopolous
Personal information
- Full name: Anthony Pantazopolous
- Date of birth: 22 April 2003 (age 23)
- Place of birth: Melbourne, Australia
- Position: Central defender

Team information
- Current team: Western Sydney Wanderers
- Number: 22

Youth career
- Brunswick City
- Oakleigh Cannons

Senior career*
Years	Team	Apps	(Gls)
2019–2020	Brunswick City	1	(0)
2021–2023	Oakleigh Cannons	52	(4)
2023–	Western Sydney Wanderers	40	(3)

International career^{‡}
2025–	Australia U23	4	(0)
- * Club domestic league appearances and goals as of 31 January 2025 ‡ National team caps and goals as of 10 September 2025

Anthony Pantazopoulos (Greek: Άντονι Πανταζόπουλος, pronounced [pan.taˈzo.pu.los]; born 22 April 2003) is an Australian soccer player who plays as a central defender for A-League club Western Sydney Wanderers.

== Career ==
=== Oakleigh Cannons ===
Pantazopolous spent 11 years as a youth player at Brunswick City being inspired by his father, who was a player for Port Melbourne SC. Pantazopolous started his senior career at Oakleigh Cannons, with his debut coming in 2021. He primarily played as a left back due to his athleticism.

=== Western Sydney Wanderers ===
Pantazopolous joined Western Sydney Wanderers on 5 July 2023 from Oakleigh Cannons, where he had won the Victorian National Premier League and Community Shield. Pantazopolous was handed his debut by Marko Rudan on the 3rd November, 2023 against Western United in a 5–0 win, alongside fellow recent recruits Dylan Scicluna and Oscar Priestman, replacing captain Marcelo. He made 26 appearances in the 2024–25 A-League season, scoring two goals. He impressed in his debut season, particularly with his ball-striking and physical attributes and has been praised by commentators such as Andy Harper and his team-mates, specifically Juan Mata, being compared to former Socceroo, Sasa Ognenovski.

He extended his contract for a further two years on 7 March 2025, with the club stating that the new contract was, "Marking a breakout campaign where he showcased his composure, versatility, and defensive strength."

== International career ==
In March 2025, Pantazopolous was called up to the Australia men's national under-23 soccer team by Tony Vidmar for the Doha International U23 Cup, where the team ended the tournament unbeaten. He was further called up in May 2025 for international friendly matches against South Korea.
