= Dylan Scicluna =

Maltese footballer (born 2004)

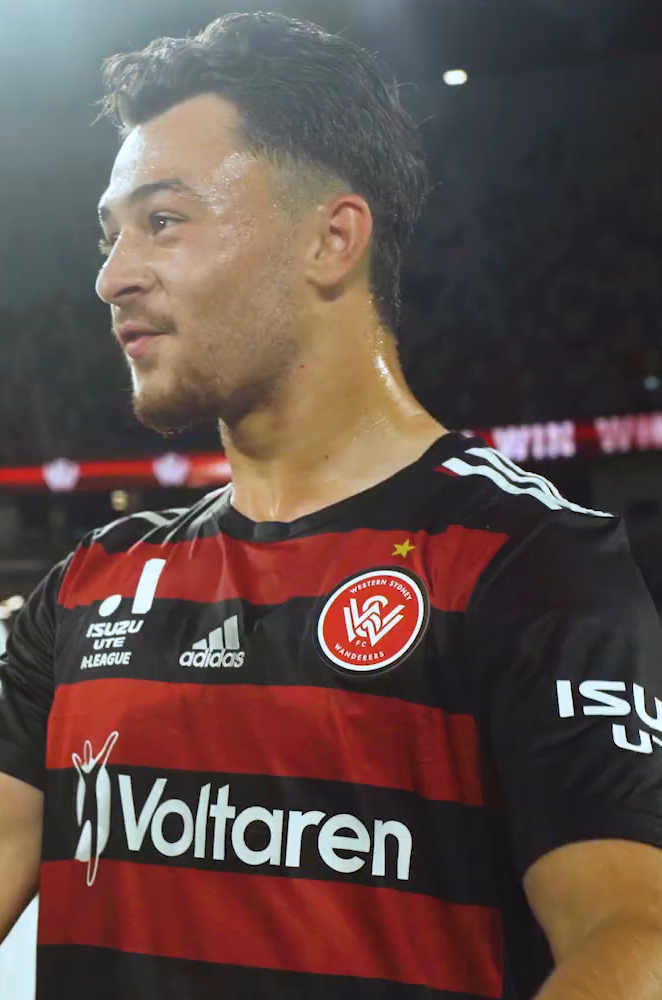
- Scicluna with Western Sydney Wanderers in 2023

Personal information
- Full name: Dylan Dean Scicluna
- Date of birth: 10 June 2004 (age 22)
- Place of birth: Australia
- Position: Central midfielder

Team information
- Current team: Western Sydney Wanderers
- Number: 8

Youth career
- 2017–2023: Wolverhampton Wanderers

Senior career*
Years	Team	Apps	(Gls)
2023–	Western Sydney Wanderers	54	(1)

International career^{‡}
2022	Australia U20	2	(0)
2023	Malta U19	2	(0)
2024	Malta U21	4	(0)
- * Club domestic league appearances and goals as of 20 November 2026 ‡ National team caps and goals as of 22 March 2024

Dylan Dean Scicluna (Maltese: [ʃkluˈna]; born 10 June 2004) is a professional footballer who plays as a central midfielder for Western Sydney Wanderers. Born in Australia, he most recently represented Malta at youth level.

== Early life ==
Scicluna moved to England at the age of nine.

== Club career ==
As a youth player, Scicluna joined the youth academy of English side Wolverhampton Wanderers.

=== Western Sydney Wanderers ===
On 3 September 2023, Scicluna signed for the Western Sydney Wanderers. He made his debut in the A-League Men against Western United on 28 October 2023. In his first season he made 16 appearances, with 3 starts. The second, the 2024/25 season he played 9 games and scored his first A-League goal against the Wellington Phoenix in Round 9, then suffered an unfortunate Anterior Cruciate Ligament injury 5 days later against Adelaide United on the 27th of December 2024.

== Style of play ==
Scicluna mainly operates as a midfielder. He has also been used in the fullback role due to his stamina and pace when pressing without the ball and making overlapping runs when the Wanderers are on attack. Marko Rudan has praised the young defender for his ability to become versatile and play different roles and positions to support his team.

== Personal life ==
Scicluna is the older brother of Maltese footballer Lucas Scicluna.
