= 2022–23 Western Sydney Wanderers FC season =

Western Sydney Wanderers
2022–23 season
- Chairman: Paul Lederer
- Manager: Marko Rudan
- Stadium: CommBank Stadium
- A-League Men: 4th
- A-League Men Finals: Elimination-finals
- Top goalscorer: Brandon Borrello (13)
- Highest home attendance: 26,462 vs. Sydney FC (11 February 2023); A-League Men
- Lowest home attendance: 7,051 vs. Macarthur FC (25 February 2023); A-League Men
- Average home league attendance: 10,769
- Biggest win: 4–0 vs. Macarthur FC (H) (1 January 2023); A-League Men; 4-0 vs. Macarthur FC (H) (25 February 2023); 4–0 vs. Sydney FC (A) (18 March 2023)
- Biggest defeat: 0–3 vs. Central Coast Mariners (H) (5 November 2022); A-League Men
Home colours	Away colours	Third colours
- All statistics correct as of 28 April 2023.

The 2022–23 season is the eleventh in the history of Western Sydney Wanderers Football Club. The club is participating in the A-League Men for the eleventh time.

== Players ==
Note: Flags indicate national team as defined under FIFA eligibility rules; some limited exceptions apply. Players may hold more than one non-FIFA nationality.

No.	Pos.	Nation	Player
1	GK	AUS	Daniel Margush
2	DF	AUS	Gabriel Cleur
3	DF	CIV	Adama Traoré
4	MF	FRA	Morgan Schneiderlin (on loan from Nice)
5	DF	AUS	Tomislav Mrcela
6	DF	BRA	Marcelo (captain)
8	MF	AUS	Oliver Bozanic
9	FW	AUS	Kusini Yengi
10	MF	SRB	Miloš Ninković
11	FW	TUN	Amor Layouni (on loan from Vålerenga)
13	DF	AUS	Tate Russell
14	MF	AUS	Nicolas Milanovic
16	MF	AUS	Tom Beadling
17	MF	FRA	Romain Amalfitano

No.	Pos.	Nation	Player
19	DF	AUS	Daniel Wilmering
20	GK	AUS	Lawrence Thomas
21	MF	AUS	Jarrod Carluccio
23	MF	COD	Yeni Ngbakoto
26	FW	AUS	Brandon Borrello
28	MF	AUS	Calem Nieuwenhof (scholarship)
29	MF	AUS	Terry Antonis
31	FW	AUS	Aidan Simmons (scholarship)
32	FW	AUS	Nathanael Blair (scholarship)
33	DF	AUS	Alex Bonetig (scholarship)
35	MF	AUS	Zac Sapsford
36	MF	AUS	Alessandro Lopane
37	FW	AUS	Alexander Badolato (scholarship)
—	DF	AUS	Rhys Williams

== Transfers ==
=== Transfers in ===
No.	Position	Player	Transferred from	Type/fee	Contract length	Date	Ref
20	GK	Lawrence Thomas	(Denmark) SønderjyskE	Free transfer	3 years	30 May 2022	
35	MF	Zac Sapsford	Sydney FC Youth	Free transfer	3 years	2 June 2022	
17	MF	(France) Romain Amalfitano	Unattached	Free transfer	1 year	4 June 2022	
9	FW	Kusini Yengi	Unattached	Free transfer	2 years	5 June 2022	
28	MF	Calem Nieuwenhof	Unattached	Free transfer	2 years (scholarship)	6 June 2022	
31	FW	Aidan Simmons	Sydney FC Youth	Free transfer	2 years (scholarship)	9 June 2022	
32	FW	Nathanael Blair	(Australia) APIA Leichhardt	Free transfer	2 years (scholarship)	10 June 2022	
8	MF	Oliver Bozanic	Unattached	Free transfer	2 years	19 June 2022	
2	DF	Gabriel Cleur	(Italy) Virtus Entella	Free transfer	3 years	20 June 2022	
23	MF	(Democratic Republic of the Congo) Yeni Ngbakoto	Unattached	Free transfer	1 year	23 June 2022	
16	MF	Tom Beadling	(England) Barrow	Free transfer	1 year	1 July 2022	
10	MF	(Serbia) Miloš Ninković	Unattached	Free transfer	1 year	3 July 2022	
12	DF	Ruon Tongyik	Unattached	Free transfer	2 years	22 July 2022	
11	FW	(Bosnia and Herzegovina) Sulejman Krpić	Unattached	Free transfer	1 year	24 July 2022	
26	FW	Brandon Borrello	(Germany) Dynamo Dresden	Free transfer	2 years	26 July 2022	
6	DF	(Brazil) Marcelo	Unattached	Free transfer	1 year	31 July 2022	
4	MF	(France) Morgan Schneiderlin	(France) Nice	Loan	4 months	28 January 2023	
14	MF	Nicolas Milanovic	Western United	Free transfer	2.5 years	7 February 2023	
11	FW	(Tunisia) Amor Layouni	(Norway) Vålerenga	Loan	4 months	9 February 2023	

==== From youth squad ====
No.	Position	Player	Age	Notes	Ref
33	DF	Alex Bonetig	19	2-year scholarship contract	

=== Transfers out ===
No.	Position	Player	Transferred to	Type/fee	Date	Ref
17	MF	Keanu Baccus	(Scotland) St Mirren	Free transfer	26 April 2022	
25	DF	Phillip Cancar	(Scotland) Livingston	Free transfer	14 May 2022	
2	DF	(Scotland) Ziggy Gordon	Unattached	End of contract	14 May 2022	
9	FW	Bernie Ibini	Unattached	End of contract	14 May 2022	
10	FW	(Israel) Tomer Hemed	Unattached	End of contract	14 May 2022	
11	FW	(Japan) Keijiro Ogawa	(Japan) Yokohama FC	End of loan	14 May 2022	
20	GK	(Spain) Tomás Mejías	Unattached	End of contract	14 May 2022	
23	FW	Dimitri Petratos	(Saudi Arabia) Al Wehda	End of loan	14 May 2022	
8	MF	Steven Ugarkovic	Unattached	End of contract	2 June 2022	
39	DF	Thomas Aquilina	Central Coast Mariners	Free transfer	9 June 2022	
6	DF	Tass Mourdoukoutas	(Canada) York United	Mutual contract termination	16 June 2022	
21	FW	Jordan Swibel	Unattached	End of contract	1 July 2022	
33	DF	Mark Natta	Unattached	End of contract	1 July 2022	
35	DF	Nectarios Triantis	Central Coast Mariners	Mutual contract termination	1 July 2022	
–	GK	Vedran Janjetovic	Unattached	End of contract	1 July 2022	
14	MF	James Troisi	Western United	End of contract	16 July 2022	
5	MF	(England) Jack Rodwell	Sydney FC	End of contract	27 July 2022	
22	DF	John Koutroumbis	Perth Glory	Mutual contract termination	29 July 2022	
12	DF	Ruon Tongyik	(Iran) Mes Kerman	Loan	27 January 2023	
11	FW	(Bosnia and Herzegovina) Sulejman Krpić	(Bosnia and Herzegovina) Željezničar	Mutual contract termination	29 January 2023	
7	FW	Ramy Najjarine	Western United	Mutual contract termination	7 February 2023	

=== Contract extensions ===
No.	Player	Position	Duration	Date	Notes	Ref
36	Alessandro Lopane	Forward	3 years	31 May 2022		
1	Daniel Margush	Goalkeeper	2 years	10 June 2022		
21	Jarrod Carluccio	Winger	2 years	15 June 2022		
5	Tomislav Mrcela	Centre-back	2 years	27 June 2022		
7	Ramy Najjarine	Winger	2 years	6 July 2022		
13	Tate Russell	Right-back	2 years	2 February 2023	Contract extended from end of 2022–23 until end of 2024–25.	
6	(Brazil) Marcelo	Centre-back	1 year	28 March 2023	Contract extended from end of 2022–23 until end of 2023–24.	

== Technical staff ==
Western Sydney Wanderers' coach for the season is Marko Rudan, who joined the Wanderers in January 2022 and 2 months later, was appointed head coach until the end of the 2023–24 season. In July 2022, the club appointed Tomi Vidovic and Adam Griffiths as assistant coaches and Pedro Ramos as the Head Analyst.

Position	Name
Head coach	(Australia) Marko Rudan
Assistant coach	(Australia) Tomi Vidovic
Assistant coach	(Australia) Adam Griffiths
Head Analyst	(Spain) Pedro Ramos
Goalkeeping coach	(Australia) Jess Vanstrattan
High performance manager	(Australia) Elias Boukarim
Head physiotherapist	(Australia) Stan Ivancic
Strength & conditioning coach	(Australia) Ray Younis

== Pre-season and friendlies ==
Win Draw Loss Cancelled or postponed Fixtures

Brisbane Roar	0–2	Western Sydney Wanderers	Gold Coast
	Report	Amalfitano; Ngbakoto

Gold Coast United (Australia)	0–8	Western Sydney Wanderers	Gold Coast
	Report	Najjarine (?); Sapsford (?); Caluccio (?); Beadling (?); Yengi (?); Borrello (?); Krpić (?)

3 September 2022	Western Sydney Wanderers	Cancelled	(Australia) Sydney United 58	Blacktown
		Source; Cancellation		Stadium: Wanderers Football Park

6 September 2022	Western Sydney Wanderers	Cancelled	Macarthur FC	Blacktown
		Source; Cancellation		Stadium: Wanderers Football Park

10 September 2022	Western Sydney Wanderers	1–1	Western United	Blacktown
	Krpić 38'	Report	Botic 81'	Stadium: Wanderers Football Park

17 September 2022	Western Sydney Wanderers	0–0	Newcastle Jets	Blacktown
		Report		Stadium: Wanderers Football Park

1 October 2022	Western Sydney Wanderers	0–2	Central Coast Mariners	Sydney
15:00 AEST		Report	Ruhs; Ayongo (pen.)	Attendance: 0 (behind closed doors)

23 November 2022 Sydney Super Cup	Western Sydney Wanderers	1–5	(England) Everton	Parramatta, Australia
	Najjarine 17'	Report	Maupay 14'; Gordon 30', 59', 90'; Cannon 66'	Stadium: Commbank Stadium; Attendance: 14,522; Referee: Adam Kersey

== Competitions ==
=== Overall record ===
Competition	First match	Last match	Starting round	Final position	Record							
Competition	First match	Last match	Starting round	Final position	Pld	W	D	L	GF	GA	GD	Win %
A-League Men	9 October 2022	28 April 2023	Matchday 1	4th	26	11	8	7	43	27	+16	42.31
A-League Men Finals	6 May 2023	6 May 2023	Elimination-finals	Elimination-finals	1	0	0	1	1	2	−1	0.00
Total					27	11	8	8	44	29	+15	40.74

Last updated: 28 April 2023
Source: Soccerway

=== A-League Men ===
==== League table ====
Pos	Team	Pld	W	D	L	GF	GA	GD	Pts	Qualification
2	Central Coast Mariners (C)	26	13	5	8	55	35	+20	44	Qualification for AFC Cup group stage and Finals series
3	Adelaide United	26	11	9	6	53	46	+7	42	Qualification for Finals series (Note: The top two teams enter the finals series at the semi-finals, while the teams ranked third to sixth enter the finals series at the elimination-finals.)
4	Western Sydney Wanderers	26	11	8	7	43	27	+16	41	Qualification for Finals series
5	Sydney FC	26	11	5	10	40	39	+1	38	Qualification for Finals series
6	Wellington Phoenix (Note: Wellington Phoenix cannot qualify for Asian Football Confederation competitions as they are based in New Zealand, which is under the Oceania Football Confederation.)	26	9	8	9	39	45	−6	35	Qualification for Finals series

Source: A-Leagues
Rules for classification: 1) Points; 2) Goal difference; 3) Goals scored; 4) Points per game; 5) Least red cards; 6) Least yellow cards; 7) Toss of a coin in an event of a tie of two clubs.
(C) Champions

==== Results summary ====
Overall								Home						Away					
Pld	W	D	L	GF	GA	GD	Pts	W	D	L	GF	GA	GD	W	D	L	GF	GA	GD
26	11	8	7	43	27	+16	41	8	2	3	24	10	+14	3	6	4	19	17	+2

Last updated: 28 April 2023.
Source: Ultimate A-League

==== Results by round ====
Round	1	2	3	4	5	6	7	8	9	10	11	12	13	14	15	16	17	18	19	20	21	22	23	24	25	26
Ground	H	A	H	H	H	A	A	A	A	H	A	H	A	A	H	H	A	H	H	A	A	H	A	H	H	A
Result	W	W	D	W	L	W	D	L	D	W	L	D	D	D	W	L	D	W	W	L	W	L	D	W	W	L
Position	3	2	2	2	2	2	2	2	2	2	3	3	3	3	2	4	4	3	2	4	3	4	4	4	4	4
Points	3	6	7	10	10	13	14	14	15	18	18	19	20	21	24	24	25	28	31	31	34	34	35	38	41	41

Updated to match(es) played on 28 April 2023. Source: Ultimate A-League
A = Away; H = Home; W = Win; D = Draw; L = Loss

==== Matches ====
9 October 2022 1	Western Sydney Wanderers	1–0	Perth Glory	Sydney
15:00 AEDT	Krpić 78'	Report		Stadium: CommBank Stadium; Attendance: 8,984; Referee: Kurt Ams

15 October 2022 2	Melbourne Victory	0–1	Western Sydney Wanderers	Melbourne
17:00 AEDT		Report	Mrcela 41'	Stadium: AAMI Park; Attendance: 18,017; Referee: Kurt Ams

22 October 2022 3	Western Sydney Wanderers	1–1	Brisbane Roar	Sydney
17:00 AEDT	Krpić 5'	Report	Austin 50'	Stadium: CommBank Stadium; Attendance: 9,766; Referee: Ben Abraham

28 October 2022 4	Western Sydney Wanderers	2–0	Newcastle Jets	Sydney
19:45 AEDT	Amalfitano 44'; Borrello 51'	Report		Stadium: CommBank Stadium; Attendance: 9,641; Referee: Shaun Evans

5 November 2022 5	Western Sydney Wanderers	0–3	Central Coast Mariners	Sydney
19:45 AEDT		Report	Ruhs 66', 73'; Silvera 81'	Stadium: CommBank Stadium; Attendance: 9,142; Referee: Kurt Ams

12 November 2022 6	Sydney FC	0–1	Western Sydney Wanderers	Sydney
19:45 AEDT		Report	Yengi 70'	Stadium: Allianz Stadium; Attendance: 34,232; Referee: Alex King

Mid-season break for 2022 FIFA World Cup

10 December 2022 7	Wellington Phoenix	1–1	Western Sydney Wanderers	Wollongong
17:00 AEDT	Kraev 61'	Report	Ngbakoto 79'	Stadium: WIN Stadium; Attendance: 2,502; Referee: Lachlan Keevers

18 December 2022 8	Western United	1–0	Western Sydney Wanderers	Melbourne
15:00 AEDT	Prijović 5'	Report		Stadium: AAMI Park; Attendance: 2,755; Referee: Adam Kersey

23 December 2022 9	Brisbane Roar	1–1	Western Sydney Wanderers	Brisbane
19:45 AEDT	Armiento 62'	Report	Bozanic 18'	Stadium: Moreton Daily Stadium; Attendance: 3,487; Referee: Stephen Lucas

1 January 2023 10	Western Sydney Wanderers	4–0	Macarthur FC	Sydney
17:00 AEDT	Ngbakoto 16'; Bozanic 18'; Borello 70'; Najjarine 88' (pen.)	Report		Stadium: CommBank Stadium; Attendance: 10,751; Referee: Lachlan Keevers

6 January 2023 11	Perth Glory	1–0	Western Sydney Wanderers	Perth
22:00 AEDT	Jelacic 59'	Report		Stadium: Macedonia Park; Attendance: 3,912; Referee: Jack Morgan

15 January 2023 12	Western Sydney Wanderers	1–1	Melbourne City	Sydney
15:00 AEDT	Borrello 19'	Report	Van der Venne 58'	Stadium: CommBank Stadium; Attendance: 9,887; Referee: Jack Morgan

22 January 2023 13	Newcastle Jets	1–1	Western Sydney Wanderers	Newcastle
15:00 AEDT	Thurgate 37'	Report	Bozanic 64' (pen.)	Stadium: McDonald Jones Stadium; Attendance: 5,081; Referee: Daniel Elder

28 January 2023 14	Central Coast Mariners	2–2	Western Sydney Wanderers	Gosford
19:45 AEDT	Silvera 30'; Cummings 73'	Report	Ngbakoto 35'; Borrello 60'	Stadium: Central Coast Stadium; Attendance: 8,565; Referee: Shaun Evans

5 February 2023 15	Western Sydney Wanderers	1–0	Western United	Sydney
15:00 AEDT	Ngbakoto 28'	Report		Stadium: CommBank Stadium; Attendance: 7,849; Referee: Alireza Faghani

11 February 2023 16	Western Sydney Wanderers	0–1	Sydney FC	Sydney
19:45 AEDT		Report	Burgess 16'	Stadium: CommBank Stadium; Attendance: 26,462; Referee: Adam Kersey

19 February 2023 17	Adelaide United	4–4	Western Sydney Wanderers	Adelaide
17:00 AEDT	Ibusuki 32' (pen.), 67'; Popovic 49'; Kitto 79'		Borello 46', 50'; Nieuwenhof 63'; Layouni 90+5'	Stadium: Coopers Stadium; Attendance: 10,026; Referee: Jonathon Barreiro

25 February 2023 18	Western Sydney Wanderers	4–0	Macarthur FC	Sydney
19:45 AEDT	Borello 3'; Amalfitano 37'; Schneiderlin 56' (pen.); Nieuwenhof 61'	Report		Stadium: CommBank Stadium; Attendance: 7,051; Referee: Kurt Ams

4 March 2023 19	Western Sydney Wanderers	2–0	Central Coast Mariners	Sydney
17:00 AEDT	Borello 26'; Amalfitano 60'	Report		Stadium: CommBank Stadium; Attendance: 9,899; Referee: Chris Beath

10 March 2023 20	Perth Glory	1–0	Western Sydney Wanderers	Perth
22:00 AEDT	McEneff 90+5'	Report		Stadium: HBF Park; Attendance: 7,890; Referee: Alex King

18 March 2023 21	Sydney FC	0–4	Western Sydney Wanderers	Sydney
19:45 AEDT		Report	Yengi 13'; Layouni 21', 75'; Nieuwenhof 62'	Stadium: Allianz Stadium; Attendance: 28,929; Referee: Alireza Faghani

31 March 2023 22	Western Sydney Wanderers	2–3	Adelaide United	Sydney
19:45 AEDT	Yengi 44'; Marcelo 60'	Report	Warland 37', 49'; Ibusuki 55'	Stadium: Western Sydney Stadium; Attendance: 9,014; Referee: Shaun Evans

8 April 2023 23	Macarthur FC	2–2	Western Sydney Wanderers	Campbelltown
19:45 AEST	Rose 66'; Toure 90+1'	Report	Borrello 42', 90+5'	Stadium: Campbelltown Stadium; Attendance: 7,534; Referee: Ben Abraham

15 April 2023 24	Western Sydney Wanderers	2–1	Melbourne Victory	Sydney
19:45 AEST	Borrello 46'; Layouni 81'	Report	Velupillay 56'	Stadium: CommBank Stadium; Attendance: 10,788; Referee: Chris Beath

21 April 2023 25	Western Sydney Wanderers	4–0	Wellington Phoenix	Sydney
19:45 AEST	Borrello 9'; Nieuwenhof 31'; Simmons 65'; Yengi 87'	Report		Stadium: CommBank Stadium; Attendance: 10,766; Referee: Alex King

28 April 2023 26	Melbourne City	3–2	Western Sydney Wanderers	Melbourne
19:45 AEST	Tilio 49', 90+3'; Maclaren 75'	Report	Borrello 41'; Milanovic 74'	Stadium: AAMI Park; Attendance: 6,322; Referee: Alireza Faghani

==== Finals series ====
6 May 2023 Elimination-final	Western Sydney Wanderers	1–2	Sydney FC	Sydney
19:45 AEDT	Schneiderlin 39' (pen.)	Report	Mak 69'; Le Fondre 80'	Stadium: CommBank Stadium; Attendance: 27,288; Referee: Chris Beath

== Statistics ==
=== Appearances and goals ===
Includes all competitions. Players with no appearances not included in the list.

As of 6 May 2023

No.	Pos.	Nat.	Name	A-League Men		A-League Men Finals Series		Total	
No.	Pos.	Nat.	Name	Apps	Goals	Apps	Goals	Apps	Goals
2	DF	(Australia)	Gabriel Cleur	18	0	0	0	18	0
3	DF	(Ivory Coast)	Adama Traoré	25	0	1	0	26	0
4	MF	(France)	Morgan Schneiderlin	8+3	1	1	1	12	2
5	DF	(Australia)	Tomislav Mrcela	25	1	1	0	26	1
6	DF	(Brazil)	Marcelo	22	1	1	0	23	1
8	MF	(Australia)	Oliver Bozanic	10+6	3	0	0	16	3
9	FW	(Australia)	Kusini Yengi	11+6	4	0+1	0	18	4
10	MF	(Serbia)	Miloš Ninković	14+6	0	1	0	21	0
11	FW	(Tunisia)	Amor Layouni	6+4	4	1	0	11	4
14	MF	(Australia)	Nicolas Milanovic	0+11	1	0+1	0	12	1
16	MF	(Australia)	Tom Beadling	6+3	0	0+1	0	10	0
17	MF	(France)	Romain Amalfitano	24	3	1	0	25	3
19	DF	(Australia)	Daniel Wilmering	2+7	0	0+1	0	10	0
20	GK	(Australia)	Lawrence Thomas	26	0	1	0	27	0
21	MF	(Australia)	Jarrod Carluccio	1+8	0	0	0	9	0
23	FW	(Democratic Republic of the Congo)	Yeni Ngbakoto	12+6	4	0+1	0	19	4
26	FW	(Australia)	Brandon Borrello	26	13	1	0	27	13
28	MF	(Australia)	Calem Nieuwenhof	26	4	1	0	27	4
31	FW	(Australia)	Aidan Simmons	7+5	1	1	0	13	1
32	FW	(Australia)	Nathanael Blair	1+2	0	0	0	3	0
33	DF	(Australia)	Alex Bonetig	0+3	0	0	0	3	0
35	MF	(Australia)	Zac Sapsford	0+5	0	0	0	5	0
36	MF	(Australia)	Alessandro Lopane	0+7	0	0	0	7	0
37	FW	(Australia)	Alexander Badolato	0+4	0	0	0	4	0
67	MF	(Australia)	Marcus Younis	0+1	0	0	0	1	0
Player(s) transferred out but featured this season
7	MF	(Australia)	Ramy Najjarine	5+6	1	0	0	11	1
11	FW	(Bosnia and Herzegovina)	Sulejman Krpić	9+4	2	0	0	13	2
12	DF	(Australia)	Ruon Tongyik	1+3	0	0	0	4	0

=== Disciplinary record ===
Includes all competitions. The list is sorted by squad number when total cards are equal. Players with no cards not included in the list.

As of 6 May 2023

Rank	No.	Pos.	Nat.	Name	A-League Men			A-League Men Finals Series			Total		
Rank	No.	Pos.	Nat.	Name	Booked	(yellow card) (yellow-red card)	Sent off (straight red)	Booked	(yellow card) (yellow-red card)	Sent off (straight red)	Booked	(yellow card) (yellow-red card)	Sent off (straight red)
1	6	DF	(Brazil)	Marcelo	4	0	2	0	0	0	4	0	2
2	5	DF	(Australia)	Tomislav Mrcela	4	0	1	0	0	0	4	0	1
3	23	FW	(Democratic Republic of the Congo)	Yeni Ngbakoto	3	0	1	0	0	0	3	0	1
4	3	DF	(Ivory Coast)	Adama Traoré	3	1	0	0	0	0	3	1	0
5	2	DF	(Australia)	Gabriel Cleur	8	0	0	0	0	0	8	0	0
6	28	MF	(Australia)	Calem Nieuwenhof	7	0	0	0	0	0	7	0	0
7	26	FW	(Australia)	Brandon Borrello	5	0	0	1	0	0	6	0	0
8	17	MF	(France)	Romain Amalfitano	5	0	0	0	0	0	5	0	0
9	4	MF	(France)	Morgan Schneiderlin	3	0	0	0	0	0	3	0	0
9	10	MF	(Serbia)	Milos Ninkovic	2	0	0	1	0	0	3	0	0
9	16	MF	(Australia)	Tom Beadling	3	0	0	0	0	0	3	0	0
12	11	FW	(Tunisia)	Amor Layouni	2	0	0	0	0	0	2	0	0
12	31	MF	(Australia)	Aidan Simmons	2	0	0	0	0	0	2	0	0
14	9	FW	(Australia)	Kusini Yengi	1	0	0	0	0	0	1	0	0
14	20	GK	(Australia)	Lawrence Thomas	1	0	0	0	0	0	1	0	0
14	21	MF	(Australia)	Jarrod Carluccio	1	0	0	0	0	0	1	0	0
14	33	DF	(Australia)	Alex Bonetig	1	0	0	0	0	0	1	0	0
14	36	MF	(Australia)	Alessandro Lopane	1	0	0	0	0	0	1	0	0
14	Player(s) transferred out but featured this season												
1	11	FW	(Bosnia and Herzegovina)	Sulejman Krpić	3	0	0	0	0	0	3	0	0
2	7	MF	(Australia)	Ramy Najjarine	1	0	0	0	0	0	1	0	0
Total					60	1	4	2	0	0	60	1	4

=== Clean sheets ===
Includes all competitions. The list is sorted by squad number when total clean sheets are equal. Numbers in parentheses represent games where both goalkeepers participated and both kept a clean sheet; the number in parentheses is awarded to the goalkeeper who was substituted on, whilst a full clean sheet is awarded to the goalkeeper who was on the field at the start and end of play. Goalkeepers with no clean sheets not included in the list.

As of 6 May 2023

Rank	No.	Nat.	Goalkeeper	A-League Men	A-League Men Finals Series	Total
1	20	(Australia)	Lawrence Thomas	10	0	10
Total				10	0	10
