= Calem Nieuwenhof =

Australian soccer player (born 2001)

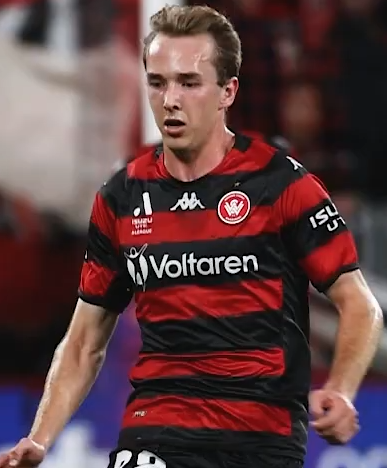
- Nieuwenhof playing for Western Sydney Wanderers in 2023

Personal information
- Full name: Calem Nieuwenhof
- Date of birth: 17 February 2001 (age 25)
- Place of birth: North Curl Curl, New South Wales, Australia
- Height: 1.81 m (5 ft 11 in)
- Position: Defensive midfielder

Team information
- Current team: Perth Glory (on loan from Heart of Midlothian)
- Number: 28

Youth career
- Curl Curl FC
- –2013: FNSW NTC
- 2014–2018: Manly United

Senior career*
Years	Team	Apps	(Gls)
2019–2022	Sydney FC NPL	19	(0)
2020–2022	Sydney FC	11	(1)
2022	Western Sydney Wanderers NPL	2	(0)
2022–2023	Western Sydney Wanderers	27	(4)
2023–	Heart of Midlothian	36	(2)
2026–	→ Perth Glory (loan)	0	(0)

International career^{‡}
2023–	Australia U23	7	(0)
- * Club domestic league appearances and goals as of 19 May 2025 ‡ National team caps and goals as of 23 November 2023

Calem Nieuwenhof (born 17 February 2001) is an Australian professional soccer player who plays as a defensive midfielder for A-League club Perth Glory, on loan from Scottish Premiership club Heart of Midlothian.

Raised in the northern suburbs of Sydney, Nieuwenhof started his professional career with Sydney FC, for whom he made his debut in the AFC Champions League in November 2020 and later signed his first contract with. He soon departed after experiencing frequent injuries and signed with Sydney rivals Western Sydney Wanderers in June 2022. After a consistent season, in which received plaudits, Nieuwenhof signed for Heart of Midlothian in July 2023.

An Australian international, Nieuwenhof received his first call-up to represent the Australia U23 in March 2023. He played his first tournament in the Maurice Revello Tournament held in France.

== Early life ==
Nieuwenhof was born in North Curl Curl, the northern suburbs of Sydney, Australia. He was interested in football from a young age due to his father and grew up supporting Sydney FC. At the age of four, he joined Curl Curl FC before moving into the NPL youth level, by the time he was 12, with Manly United.

== Club career ==
=== Sydney FC ===
Nieuwenhof initially started with the Sydney FC Youth squad in the A-League Youth and NPL NSW. On 19 November 2020, Nieuwenhof made his professional first-team debut, as an injury replacement player, in a 2–1 home loss against Shanghai SIPG in the AFC Champions League.

Nieuwenhof signed his first professional contract with Sydney FC on 8 December. On 2 January 2021, he started and scored on his league debut, a long-shot outside of the 18 yard, in a 2–1 win against Wellington Phoenix at Sky Stadium. He earned a starting place in the squad under Steve Corica, making a further 8 appearances before injuring his back during Easter weekend. A scan revealed that Nieuwenhof had suffered a fractured vertebrae to his back, consigning him to eight-weeks on the sidelines. He was awarded the club's A-League Goal of the Season for his goal against Wellington.

Nieuwenhof returned to the squad, playing his first match in eight months, against Sydney Olympic in the FFA Cup on 24 November 2021. He struggled to make appearances in the squad due to injuries, and by the end of the 2021–22 season, he made only 2 league appearances with a combined total of 48 minutes played. On 19 May 2022, Nieuwenhof departed Sydney FC but was allowed to stay within the club until he was fully recovered from his injury.

=== Western Sydney Wanderers ===
On 6 June 2022, Nieuwenhof signed a two-year scholarship deal with cross-town rival Western Sydney Wanderers. On 9 October, he made his league debut in a 1–0 win against Perth Glory. By November, Nieuwenhof led the league in tackles (28) and sat third in ball recoveries (58) behind Neil Kilkenny and former teammate Luke Brattan over the first six games of the season, which led him to earn the October/November nomination for Young Footballer of the Year.

During the league campaign, Nieuwenhof remained a starter for the club despite a stacked experienced midfield that featured Oliver Bozanic, Romain Amalfitano and former teammate Miloš Ninković. He later formed a partnership with former Premier League player Morgan Schneiderlin, who arrived in January on loan, and mentored Nieuwenhof from his experiences in the top divisions of Europe. Schneiderlin praised his professionalism in training and his performances in matches. Likewise, Nieuwenhof expressed his admiration for Schneiderlin and reciprocated the praise following the pair's first match against Western United.

On 19 February 2023, Nieuwenhof scored his first goal for the club and added an assist in a 4–4 away draw against Adelaide United. On 18 March, he brought his tally to 3 goals of the season, after scoring past Andrew Redmayne from 25-yards, in a 4–0 Sydney Derby win against his former side Sydney FC. His goal was awarded Goal of the Week. Nieuwenhof would lead his side to a fourth-place finish at the conclusion of the league season, helping the Wanderers qualify to the A-League Finals series for the first time since the club qualified in 2017. He finished the season with 4 goals in 27 appearances with the Wanderers, before shortly departing in July 2023.

=== Heart of Midlothian ===
On 22 July 2023, Nieuwenhof signed a four-year contract with Heart of Midlothian for an undisclosed fee, rumoured to be a fee of six-figures. As the first summer signing for the club, he joins alongside compatriots, Kye Rowles, Nathaniel Atkinson and Cammy Devlin. In an interview with Heart TV, he spoke of his decision to join the Hearts, stating, "It was a pretty easy decision. I played with Oli Bozanic last year and he spoke so highly of his time here [...] I actually came to a Hearts game back in 2018 and I remember vividly how much passion there was. So I’m really excited to come and play and represent everyone here." He received the number 8 ahead of the 2023–24 Scottish Premiership.

Nieuwenhof made his debut on 5 August, as Hearts completed a 2–0 win over St Johnstone at McDiarmid Park.

== International career ==
=== Youth ===
In March 2023, following his immense form at club level, Nieuwenhof received his first call-up to the Australia U23 training camp, in preparations, for the Paris 2024 Olympics qualification. On 24 March, he made his debut for the Olyroos, starting the match against the Switzerland U20 side, before being substituted for Ryan Teague, in a narrow 1–0 defeat at Stadio Comunale Bellinzona.

On 24 May, Nieuwenhof was announced in the Australia U23 squad list for the Maurice Revello Tournament in France. He would be one of 14 players signed to an A-League Men club that was representing the Olyroos. Nieuwenhof started in the maiden fixture against Qatar where his side lost 4–3 in a penalty shoot-out, following a 0–0 scoreline by full-time, when Nieuwenhof failed to hit the target in the deciding penalty kick, handing the bonus point to Qatar. In the final group match, he grabbed an assist, a pass through to Noah Botic who struck with his left, in a 2–0 win against Mexico on 12 June that ensured qualification to the semi final.

In August 2023, Nieuwenhof was recalled for the Olyroos ahead of the 2024 AFC U23 Asian Cup qualifiers. He was included in the 23-man squad set to play against Laos and Tajikistan in September.

== Personal life ==
Nieuwenhof is a lifelong Sydney FC fan and revealed his favourite match was a Sydney Derby clash where Sydney FC won 4–0 in front of a crowd of 61,880. He is a close friend of Jake Hollman who both played together in Manly United and Sydney FC youth squads. He is also close friends with professional cricketer Ollie Davies who both grew up together in Northern Beaches.

His father was a former footballer who played for Manly United and helped Nieuwenhof with his development through the youth system. He considers both Miloš Ninković and Luke Brattan as mentors, with the midfielders helping him settle with the first team during his first years in Sydney FC. He was given the nickname "Sleepy" by his teammates due to his laconic and relaxed personality that makes him look "half-awake".

He studied commerce at UNSW which has a partnership with Sydney FC, allowing him to study and play football simultaneously.

== Career statistics ==
As of 24 July 2025

Appearances and goals by club, season and competition
Club	Season	League			Domestic Cup		Continental		Other		Total	
Club	Season	Division	Apps	Goals	Apps	Goals	Apps	Goals	Apps	Goals	Apps	Goals
Sydney FC	2019–20	A-League	0	0	—		—		—		0	0
Sydney FC	2020–21	A-League	9	1	—		4 (Note: Appearances in AFC Champions League)	0	—		13	1
Sydney FC	2021–22	A-League	2	0	2	0	0	0	—		4	0
Sydney FC	Total		11	1	2	0	4	0	0	0	17	1
Western Sydney Wanderers	2022–23	A-League	27	4	0	0	0	0	1 (Note: Appearance in Sydney Super Cup)	0	28	4
Heart of Midlothian	2023–24	Scottish Premiership	24	1	3	1	0	0	0	0	27	2
Heart of Midlothian	2024–25	Scottish Premiership	12	1	2	1	0	0	0	0	14	2
Heart of Midlothian	2025–26	Scottish Premiership	0	0	4	0	0	0	0	0	4	0
Heart of Midlothian	Total		36	2	9	2	0	0	0	0	45	4
Career total			73	7	11	2	4	0	1	0	89	9

== Honours ==
Individual

- PFA A-League Team of the Season: 2022–23
