= Sydney Derby (A-Leagues) =

Club soccer rivalry in Sydney

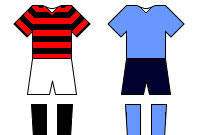
- Location: Sydney
- Teams: Sydney FC; Western Sydney Wanderers
- First meeting: 20 October 2012; A-League; WS Wanderers 0–1 Sydney FC
- Latest meeting: 16 October 2026; A-League Men; Sydney FC 0–0 WS Wanderers
- Next meeting: 30 January 2027; A-League Men; WS Wanderers vs Sydney FC

Statistics
- Total meetings: 45
- Most wins: Sydney FC (22)
- Top scorer: Alex Brosque (6 goals)
- All-time series: Sydney FC: 22; Drawn: 11; WS Wanderers: 12
- Largest victory: WS Wanderers 0–5 Sydney FC; A-League (9 December 2017)

The Sydney Derby is a local derby contested between two of the Australian A-League Men's Sydney-based clubs, Sydney FC and Western Sydney Wanderers. Contested for the first time on 20 October 2012, historical, cultural and sporting factors have resulted in the derby being considered one of Australian sport's biggest club games, and one of the biggest rivalries in the A-League Men. Crowd sentiment at derby matches has been said by Alessandro Del Piero to produce atmosphere and emotions similar to those in Europe, while Wanderers player Mateo Poljak stated that the sixth Sydney Derby had an atmosphere that was the best he had experienced as a player.

== Origins ==
A map showing the intended geographic representation of each A-League club in Sydney. Macarthur FC Sydney FC Western Sydney Wanderers

The competitive nature of the Sydney Derby is largely based upon the historical, cultural and geographical divide between Sydney's West (home to Western Sydney Wanderers), and east (home to Sydney FC). The cultural makeup of the two clubs fits into this wider divide. As Sydney FC began their life in Moore Park they took on the "Bling FC" moniker, with the ownership intent on building Sydney FC into the "glamour club" of the A-League Men.

The rivalry between the two clubs also stems from the A-League Men's establishment. Prior to the 2012 introduction of Western Sydney Wanderers in the A-League Men, the only club to be based in the city was Sydney FC as part of The FA's 'one-city, one-team' policy for the newly established league. This deal gave Sydney FC a five-year city exclusivity, allowing the club grow throughout the region without competition. Sydney FC was not entirely embraced by the region, as the club's original intention to play at Parramatta Stadium was later changed by FA chairman Frank Lowy. Lowy's decision for the club to play out of the Sydney Football Stadium left some fans in Sydney's west feeling alienated from the club. Sydney FC's perceived exclusion of the western region mirrored the pre-existing cultural and social divide of the city.

In 2008, The FA sought to introduce the new western Sydney-based Sydney Rovers into the A-League Men. This later proved unsuccessful with the club dissolving due to technical and financial reasons. During the time period prior to the disbanding of Sydney Rovers, two matches hosted by Sydney FC were played at Parramatta Stadium. In the first, a pocket of supporters came out bearing banners in support of the new western Sydney team with the Sydney FC active support group The Cove responding by chanting against the support for the new club.

On 4 April 2012, the collapse of Gold Coast United brought about the rushed creation of Western Sydney Wanderers. The FA's decision for the club to be community oriented proved successful with the local Western Sydney community soon backing the club, a club they had long called for, one that would represent the Western Sydney region.

== Support ==
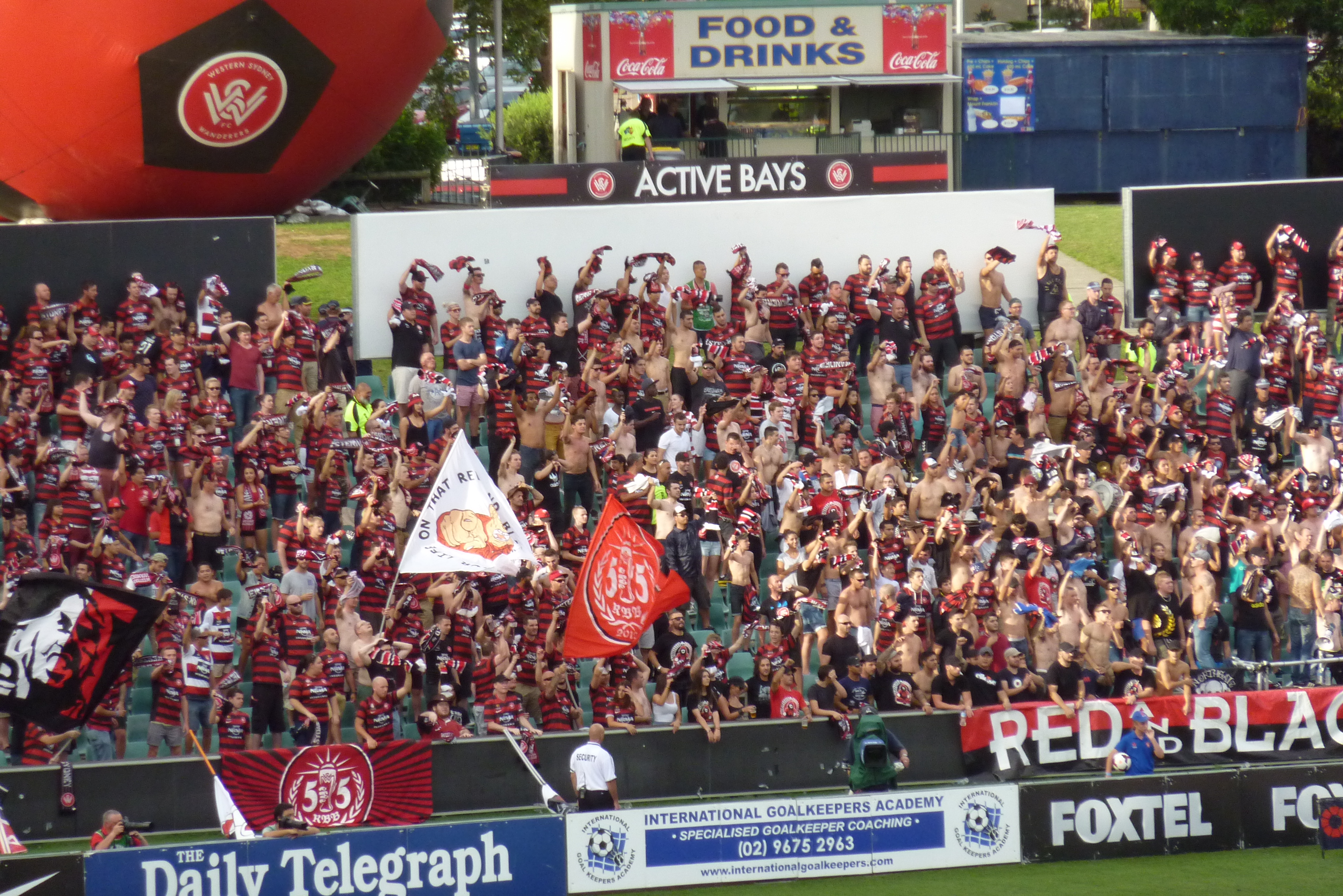
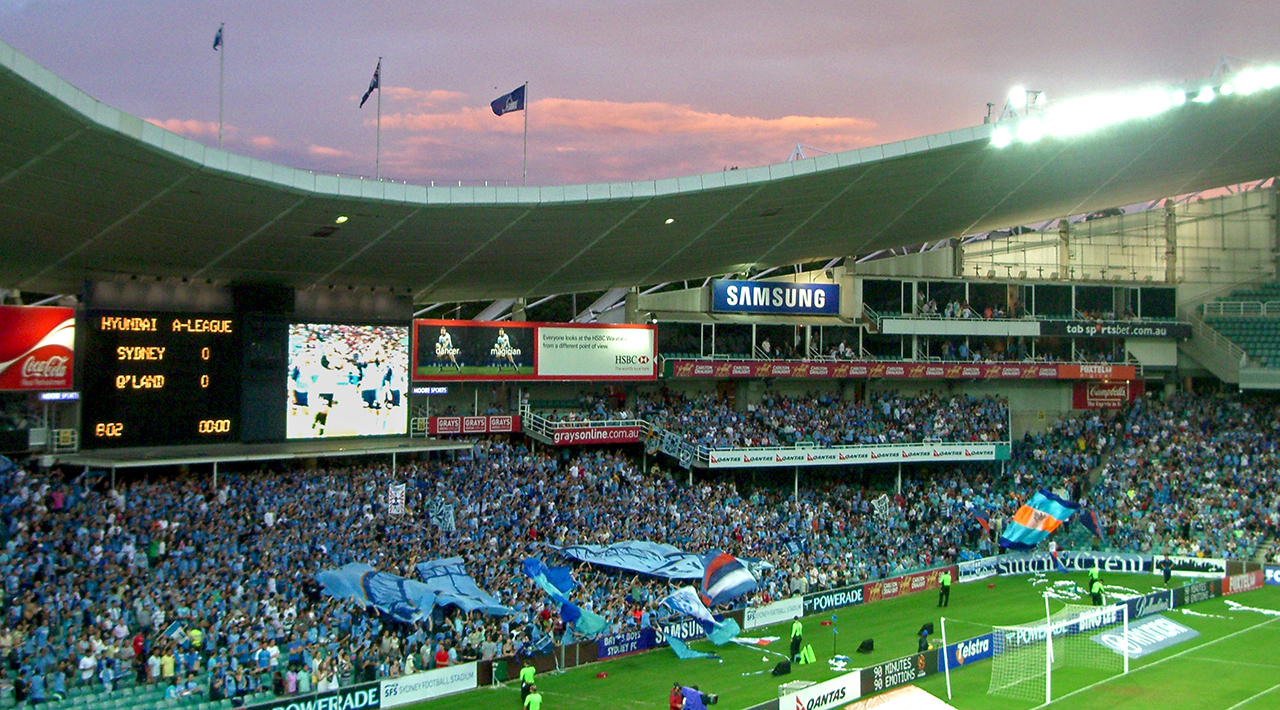
The Red and Black Bloc (left) and The Cove (right)

Both Wanderers' and Sydney's fan bases are multi-ethnic, due to the racial diversity in Sydney. The Western Sydney region especially is the most multicultural and culturally diverse region in Australia. Active support is a major part of both club's identity, and both clubs bolster active supporters groups that are considered come of the best in the A-League. Sydney FC's active support refer to themselves as "The Cove" – a reference to the original name given to the colonial settlement of Sydney – Sydney Cove. Wanderers supporters display themselves as the "RBB (Red and Black Bloc)" a reference to their historic club colours (red and black).

Sydney FC fans sprawl from across the Sydney CBD, from Hawkesbury to the Shire, and the Inner West. The fans and club have a strong relationship, strengthened by good relations with Sydney Cricket & Sports Ground Trust – the owners of Sydney Football Stadium. The club has played games across Sydney throughout several competitions, including Leichhardt Oval in the Inner West, Cromer Park in North Sydney, and several W-League games in Sutherland Shire.

== Competitive matches ==
The two clubs first met in the 2012–13 A-League season, on 20 October 2012. The match, hosted by Western Sydney Wanderers at Parramatta Stadium, was considered to be the most anticipated match of the season. The first ever derby was expected to sell out; the city rivalry alone would 'sell itself'. Western Sydney Wanderers manager Tony Popovic spoke about how the match was "special for the players and coaching staff" and that he considered that the rivalry between the two clubs was already building and would one day be the "biggest rivalry in our game". Alessandro Del Piero scored the only goal of the game, for Sydney FC. After winning a penalty, he was forced to re-take a successful first penalty due to his team encroaching in the penalty area, his second attempt was saved by Ante Covic but Del Piero pounced on the rebound and shot over the head of Covic.

The second Derby took place at the Sydney Football Stadium in front of 26,176 supporters and saw the Wanderers win their first Derby. With Del Piero on the bench due to an injury cloud, the Wanderers began the stronger, and Youssouf Hersi scored the first ever Wanderers goal in a Sydney Derby, after latching onto a knock-down from Joey Gibbs. The Wanderers doubled their lead with 13 minutes to play, as Wanderers captain and ex-Sydney FC player Michael Beauchamp attacked a low drive across the goal-mouth from Shinji Ono, his side-foot shot beating the Sydney FC goalkeeper.

The third Sydney Derby saw Western Sydney Wanderers with the chance to win the A-League Men premiership in their first ever year. A win would see them lift the trophy at Parramatta Stadium against their rivals. In the 34th minute Nikolai Topor-Stanley produced a calamitous error to gift Del Piero the ball, and the Italian striker opened the scoring. The match also included an astonishing 8 yellow cards and 2 straight red cards. Brett Emerton the Sydney FC captain saw the first straight red card for a lunging feet-first challenge on Shannon Cole. Cole then equalised for the Wanderers in the 69th minute. The second red card of the night went to Iacopo La Rocca as the Wanderers searched for a title-winning goal, when held back by a Sydney FC player La Rocca lashed out with his elbow. The Wanderers were unable to win the match and the Premiership on the night, securing their Premiership a week later in Newcastle.

The fourth derby match was played in front of a sold-out crowd of over 40,000 people. After attending the match at Sydney Football Stadium, rugby league journalist Phil Rothfield commented that the match had "proved the round-ball game has not just arrived but is bigger than rugby union and closing in on AFL and NRL." The Wanderers were dominant on the pitch and in the stands, scoring two goals that could easily have been more, while Sydney FC lacked penetration with their attack missing talisman Del Piero.

The fifth took place at Parramatta Stadium, again with a sold-out crowd and once again an ex-Sydney FC player scored for the Wanderers. The Wanderers dominated the match, striking the crossbar and posts on several occasions, including a long-range chip from Hersi that nearly caught Sydney FC keeper Vedran Janjetovic off his line, with the rebound falling to Tomi Juric who smashed his shot into the stands. Brendon Santalab scored the only goal of the match in the 86th minute. After only 5 matches the rivalry has been reported as being "one of the fiercest in Australia", and the Wanderers as having begun a pattern of one-sided dominance, having now won 3 out of the 5 matches, with 1 draw and 1 victory for Sydney FC.

The sixth derby, the final regular season derby for the 2013–14 A-League season took place at the Sydney Football Stadium. The match attracted a sold-out crowd of 40,285. This was 13,003 higher than the 27,282 who attended the National Rugby League's first match of the season between South Sydney & the Sydney Roosters. The crowd witnessed Sydney FC win their first home derby match. After a staid first half with limited highlights, the second half exploded into life as Shinji Ono pounced on a knock down from Brendon Santalab to open the scoring. The Wanderers had the chance to go two goals ahead after Richard Garcia gave away a penalty, but ex-Sydney FC player Mark Bridge had his penalty shot saved by Vedran Janjetovic. Sydney FC then equalised after Ante Covic sliced a clearing punch into the face of Matthew Jurman and saw the ball rebounded into goal. A calamitous error from another ex-Sydney FC player, Michael Beauchamp, saw him gift the ball to Richard Garcia, who tapped past Ante Covic into an open net. Ali Abbas scored a penalty during injury time to make the score 3–1. The game also featured an allegation that Wanderers player Brendon Santalab culturally abused Abbas, who took extreme offence and charged around the pitch, having to be restrained by his teammates. In a post-game interview Abbas said, "We are not here to attack religion or culture, we are here to play football".

The seventh Sydney derby was played in round two of the 2014–15 A-League season and took place in front of another sold-out crowd of 41,213 fans at the Sydney Football Stadium, the highest crowd for any sporting event held at the ground in 2014. Despite Sydney FC having much of the early possession, the first goal was scored by former Sydney FC player Mark Bridge in the 19th minute. 5 minutes later Sydney FC keeper Janjetovic attempted to clear the ball but instead he somehow palmed the ball into his own net and sent the wanderers 2–0 up. Seconds before halftime Corey Gameiro scored a goal for Sydney FC to get the score back to 2–1. After half time Sydney FC created several chances however their second goal came from an own goal scored by Wanderers midfielder Romeo Castelen. With the score level at 2–2 tempers between the two side began to flare. Wanderer Vítor Saba was red carded after a dangerous tackle on Terry Antonis. Now down to ten men, the Wanderers fell behind when Sydney FC captain Alex Brosque scored with just over ten minutes remaining, with what would prove to be the winning goal. A pitch invasion ensued as over a hundred Sydney FC fans ran from The Cove onto the field to celebrate with Brosque, a scene which sportswriter Phil Rothfield described as being "as special as it gets."

The eighth Sydney derby was played on 29 November 2014, in the 2014–15 A-League Season and took place in front of a packed crowd of 19,138 at Pirtek Stadium in Parramatta. The Wanderers started the stronger of the two sides, with both fan groups in full voice. Western Sydney Wanderers had many chances during the first half but only managed to capitalize on one. Tomi Juric pounced onto a loose ball on the box, sidefooting into the bottom left corner. Only 4 minutes later, Sydney FC equalised. The corner came in from a Wanderers player, bounced into the box, some appealing for a handball off Pedj Bojic but appeals were waved away, Bojic cleared the ball and Bernie Ibini chased the ball down, beating a defender to it from his own half. Ibini comfortably picked the ball up and went on a penetrating run, beating two Western Sydney defenders and smashing the ball past Ante Covic, the Western Sydney goalkeeper. In stoppage time at the end of the first half, a superb through pall was played to Mark Bridge who failed to score, forcing a brilliant save from Vedran Janjetovic. Towards the latter end of the second half, Sydney FC had a couple of chances. Shane Smeltz connected well with the ball and produced a volley which was tipped over by Ante Covic. In the final minute of the game, a free kick was awarded to Sydney FC, Marc Janko struck the ball beautifully, only to have it crash off the crossbar. The game ended 1–1, the second ever draw in the history of the fixture.

The thirteenth Sydney Derby, played on 8 October 2016 was a milestone match for the fixture. It set a new A-League Men crowd record of 61,880 at ANZ Stadium, as the Sky Blues triumphed in an emphatic second half, finishing 4–0. The opening goal scored by Filip Holosko, was quickly followed by a second, with Holosko assisting debutante Bobô to a tap-in. It remained a gutsy game with a plethora of saves from Danny Vukovic of Sydney FC to keep it at 2–0 until a breakaway from Sydney FC captain Alex Brosque led to a free-kick on the edge of the box, with Aritz Borda being sent off. Brandon O'Neill took the free-kick, flying it past the wall and keeper to make it three nil. Adding salt into the wounds, Matt Simon sprinted free of Dimas on a counterattack, with a cross to Bobô resulting in a parried shot, before Alex Brosque scored the fourth as it was dubbed the "Demolition Derby".

The fifteenth Sydney derby was played on 18 February 2017 at Stadium Australia. In front of a crowd of 44,843 the Wanderers ended Sydney FC's 19 game-winning run, and achieved their first derby victory in 1135 days, with a hard-fought 1–0 win, courtesy of a first half Brendon Santalab goal. The Wanderers' win denied Sydney FC the opportunity to become the first A-League Men team to finish a season undefeated. The loss was Sydney's only loss of the season, as they went on to win the Premiership and Championship with a W-D-L record of 22–6–1.

The seventeenth Sydney Derby, similarly to the thirteenth derby, was dubbed the Demolition Derby as Sydney FC thumped the Western Sydney outfit 5–0. The first goal of the game came from Polish international Adrian Mierzejewski, who slammed home a poor parry from Vedran Janjetovic. Sydney captain Alex Brosque doubled their lead, latching onto a through ball from Bobô before rounding Janjetovic for a simple tap-in. On 45 minutes, Mierzejewski scored his second of the game, and Sydney's third, with a free kick from distance which the keeper could only get a hand to as it smashed into the back of the net. After half time, a corner taken by Mierzejewski was deflected in by Western Sydney striker Lachlan Scott for 4–0. On 77 minutes, the rout was completed as Brandon O'Neill placed a curling shot in the top corner for 5–0.

On 6 October 2018, the two sides met for the first time in an FFA Cup (now Australia Cup) fixture, which saw Sydney FC defeat the Wanderers 3–0 in a semi final hosted by the Wanderers at Penrith Stadium.

The twenty third Sydney Derby was the first derby played at the Wanderers' new stadium. The Wanderers achieved their first Sydney Derby win in any competition in 980 days, winning 1–0 through a Mitchell Duke goal in the 19th minute. The twenty fourth derby was originally scheduled for Saturday 8 February 2020, but a deluge of rain in Sydney over the days prior to, and on the day itself, saw the match postponed. This would become the first ever derby to be played at Jubilee Oval, making it the seventh stadium to host the rivalry. The Wanderers went on to win the postponed match, again 1–0 with Duke scoring the decisive goal. This marked the first time they had won back to back derbies since the 2013–14 A-League season. On Saturday 21 March 2020, the match was played behind closed doors due to the COVID-19 pandemic. The match ended as a 1–1 draw, marking the first time Sydney FC hadn't won a derby in a season.

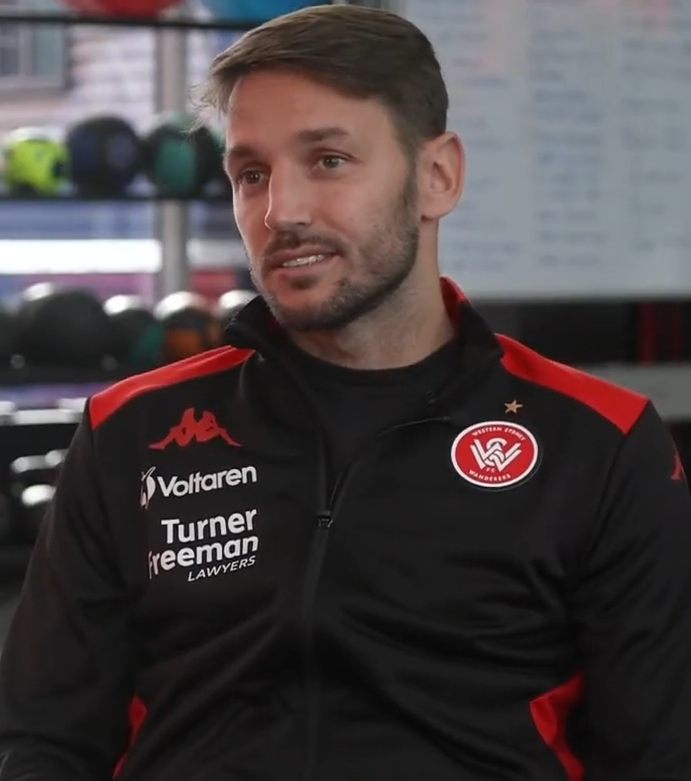
After 7 seasons, 221 matches and 41 goals for Sydney FC, Miloš Ninković left Sydney FC at the conclusion of the 2021–22 A-League season over a contract dispute, and subsequently signed with the Western Sydney Wanderers

The 32nd Sydney Derby was the first derby played at the reconstructed Sydney Football Stadium. The match saw Miloš Ninković play his first Sydney Derby for the Wanderers, having previously represented Sydney FC in 21 derbies. Ninković was the subject of a pre-match tifo from The Cove criticising his decision to join the Wanderers; the tifo read 'LEGENDS ARE CHERISHED. TRAITORS' LEGACIES WILL PERISH', along with depictions of club greats Steve Corica, Rhyan Grant and Alex Brosque as knights in shining armour, with Ninković's old No. 10 jersey being burned in the background. In front of a crowd of 34,232, the biggest Sydney Derby crowd since 2017, the Wanderers achieved their first Sydney Derby win at the Sydney Football Stadium in 3304 days, winning 1–0 through a Kusini Yengi goal in the 70th minute, with Ninković providing the assist.

The 34th Sydney Derby was the first time the fixture was contested as part of the A-League Finals, with Sydney FC emerging 2–1 victors, despite trailing 1–0 at half time. The match drew a crowd of 27,288, which is the biggest elimination final crowd in A-League history. At the conclusion of the match, Ninković went into the Sydney FC dressing room to congratulate his former Sydney FC teammates and wished them good luck for their upcoming tie against Melbourne City, before later being frogmarched out of the changing room by two Sydney FC staff members after a heated exchange of words with Sydney FC manager Steve Corica, with Wanderers manager Marko Rudan opining that the incident stemmed from "bad blood" between the two after previous verbal sideline exchanges. The situation received much response from players and reporters who said they found nothing wrong with it whilst many found Corica's reaction to being "child-like" and "over-reactive".

== Results ==
Competition	#	Date	Rnd	Home team	Score	Away team	Goals (home)	Goals (away)	Venue	Attendance (Note: Attendances listed in bold were official sell-outs.)
2012–13 A-League	1	20 October 2012	3	Wanderers	**0–1**	**Sydney**	—	Del Piero (54)	Parramatta Stadium	**19,126**
2012–13 A-League	2	15 December 2012	11	Sydney	**0–2**	**Wanderers**	—	Hersi (24), Beauchamp (77)	Sydney Football Stadium	26,176
2012–13 A-League	3	23 March 2013	26	Wanderers	**1–1**	Sydney	Cole (70)	Del Piero (34)	Parramatta Stadium	**19,585**
2013–14 A-League	4	26 October 2013	3	Sydney	**0–2**	**Wanderers**	—	La Rocca (11), Ono (26)	Sydney Football Stadium	**40,388**
2013–14 A-League	5	11 January 2014	14	**Wanderers**	**1–0**	Sydney	Santalab (86)	—	Parramatta Stadium	**18,080**
2013–14 A-League	6	8 March 2014	22	**Sydney**	**3–1**	Wanderers	Jurman (59), Garcia (75), Abbas (90+3 pen.)	Ono (49)	Sydney Football Stadium	**40,285**
2014–15 A-League	7	18 October 2014	2	**Sydney**	**3–2**	Wanderers	Gameiro (45+1), Ognenovski (49), Brosque (79)	Bridge (19), Janjetovic (24 o.g.)	Sydney Football Stadium	**41,213**
2014–15 A-League	8	29 November 2014	8	Wanderers	**1–1**	Sydney	Juric (30)	Ibini (34)	Parramatta Stadium	**19,138**
2014–15 A-League	9	28 February 2015	19	Wanderers	**3–4**	**Sydney**	La Rocca (32), Bulut (42, 52)	Covic (9 o.g.), Janko (18, 23), Antonis (74)	Parramatta Stadium	**19,484**
2015–16 A-League	10	24 October 2015	3	**Sydney**	**1–0**	Wanderers	Ninkovic (88)	—	Sydney Football Stadium	**40,539**
2015–16 A-League	11	16 January 2016	15	Wanderers	**1–2**	**Sydney**	Vidosic (58)	Faty (22), Smeltz (90)	Parramatta Stadium	**19,627**
2015–16 A-League	12	20 February 2016	20	Sydney	**1–1**	Wanderers	Jamieson (36 o.g.)	Vidošić (13)	Sydney Football Stadium	**40,382**
2016–17 A-League	13	8 October 2016	1	Wanderers	**0–4**	**Sydney**	—	Hološko (51), Bobô (55), O'Neill (85), Brosque (89)	Stadium Australia	61,880
2016–17 A-League	14	14 January 2017	15	Sydney	**0–0**	Wanderers	—	—	Sydney Football Stadium	**40,143**
2016–17 A-League	15	18 February 2017	20	**Wanderers**	**1–0**	Sydney	Santalab (26)	—	Stadium Australia	44,843
2017–18 A-League	16	21 October 2017	3	Sydney	**2–2**	Wanderers	Bobô (38 pen.), Brillante (61)	Riera (3), Hamill (30)	Sydney Football Stadium	36,057
2017–18 A-League	17	9 December 2017	10	Wanderers	**0–5**	**Sydney**	—	Mierzejewski (14, 45), Brosque (41), Scott (53 o.g.), O'Neill (76)	Stadium Australia	36,433
2017–18 A-League	18	25 February 2018	21	**Sydney**	**3–1**	Wanderers	Mierzejewski (44, 55), Bobô (73)	Riera (10)	Sydney Football Stadium	25,211
2018 FFA Cup	19	6 October 2018	SF	Wanderers	**0–3**	**Sydney**	—	Buhagiar (49), De Jong (64), Le Fondre (76 pen.)	Penrith Stadium	14,436
2018–19 A-League	20	27 October 2018	2	**Sydney**	**2–0**	Wanderers	Le Fondre (4), Brosque (53)	—	Sydney Cricket Ground	30,588
2018–19 A-League	21	15 December 2018	8	Wanderers	**1–3**	**Sydney**	Riera (23)	Brosque (45+1), De Jong (57), Tratt (81)	Stadium Australia	18,043
2018–19 A-League	22	13 April 2019	25	Wanderers	**1–1**	Sydney	Baumjohann (57)	Brosque (7)	Stadium Australia	21,984
2019–20 A-League	23	26 October 2019	3	**Wanderers**	**1–0**	Sydney	Duke (19)	—	Bankwest Stadium	**28,519**
2019–20 A-League	24	28 February 2020	18	Sydney	**0–1**	**Wanderers**	—	Duke (81)	Jubilee Oval	**18,501**
2019–20 A-League	25	21 March 2020	24	Wanderers	**1–1**	Sydney	Yeboah (82)	Le Fondre (35)	Bankwest Stadium	0 (Note: Held behind closed doors due to the COVID-19 pandemic in Australia.)
2020–21 A-League	26	16 January 2021	4	Sydney	**1–1**	Wanderers	Barbarouses (63 pen.)	Troisi (68)	Stadium Australia	14,402 (Note: Attendance was capped at 25% of the stadium's capacity due to the COVID-19 pandemic in Australia.)
2020–21 A-League	27	1 May 2021	9	**Wanderers**	**3–2**	Sydney	Kamau (12), Duke (16), McDonald (74)	Wilkinson (47), Bobô (90+4)	Bankwest Stadium	20,336
2020–21 A-League	28	23 May 2021	18	**Sydney**	**1–0**	Wanderers	Bobô (62)	—	Sydney Cricket Ground	17,121
2021–22 A-League Men	29	20 November 2021	1	Wanderers	**0–0**	Sydney	—	—	CommBank Stadium	23,118
2021–22 A-League Men	30	5 March 2022	17	**Wanderers**	**2–0**	Sydney	Hemed (37 pen.), Baccus (52)	—	CommBank Stadium	14,002
2021–22 A-League Men	31	2 April 2022	24	**Sydney**	**3–2**	Wanderers	Le Fondre (2), Buhagiar (66, 71)	Hemed (17), Russell (75)	Jubilee Oval	10,091
2022–23 A-League Men	32	12 November 2022	6	Sydney	**0–1**	**Wanderers**	—	Yengi (70)	Allianz Stadium	34,232
2022–23 A-League Men	33	11 February 2023	16	Wanderers	**0–1**	**Sydney**	—	Burgess (16)	CommBank Stadium	26,462
2022–23 A-League Men	34	18 March 2023	21	Sydney	**0–4**	**Wanderers**	—	Yengi (13), Layouni (21, 75), Nieuwenhof (62)	Allianz Stadium	28,929
2022–23 A-League Men	35	6 May 2023	EF	Wanderers	**1–2**	**Sydney**	Schneiderlin (39 pen.)	Mak (69), Le Fondre (80)	CommBank Stadium	27,288
2023–24 A-League Men	36	25 November 2023	5	Sydney	**0–1**	**Wanderers**	—	Sapsford (72)	Allianz Stadium	28,152
2023–24 A-League Men	37	2 March 2024	19	Wanderers	**1–4**	**Sydney**	Girdwood-Reich (72 o.g.)	Grant (3), Gomes (7 pen., 59), Mak (50)	CommBank Stadium	27,998
2023–24 A-League Men	38	13 April 2024	24	**Sydney**	**2–1**	Wanderers	Gomes (72), Kucharski (90+8)	Sapsford (90+5)	Allianz Stadium	26,155
2024–25 A-League Men	39	19 October 2024	1	Wanderers	**1–2**	**Sydney**	Hammond (56)	Lolley (17), Klimala (63)	CommBank Stadium	27,496
2024–25 A-League Men	40	23 November 2024	5	**Sydney**	**4–2**	Wanderers	Lolley (33), Courtney-Perkins (48), Ouahim (54 pen.), Klimala (82)	Sapsford (45), Antonsson (78)	Allianz Stadium	30,777
2024–25 A-League Men	41	8 February 2025	16	Sydney	**3–3**	Wanderers	Klimala (7), Segecic (88), Caceres (90+7)	Sapsford (9, 47), Grant (39 o.g.)	Allianz Stadium	32,741
2025–26 A-League Men	42	29 November 2025	6	**Wanderers**	**1–0**	Sydney	Kuol (51)	—	CommBank Stadium	21,258
2025–26 A-League Men	43	31 January 2026	15	Sydney	**4–1**	Wanderers	Campuzano (10), Tisserand (49), Quintal (55, 68)	Fraser (1)	Allianz Stadium	33,265
2025–26 A-League Men	44	11 April 2026	24	Wanderers	**0–2**	Sydney	—	Touré (20), Stamatelopoulos (83)	CommBank Stadium	16,135
2026–27 A-League Men	45	16 October 2026	1	Sydney	**0–0**	Wanderers	—	—	Allianz Stadium	30,103
2026–27 A-League Men	46	30 January 2027	15	Wanderers	–	Sydney			CommBank Stadium	
2026–27 A-League Men	47	3 April 2027	23	Sydney	–	Wanderers			Allianz Stadium	

== Statistics ==
As of 7 November 2026

Home record
Home team	Matches	Wins	Draws	Losses
Sydney	22	10	6	6
Wanderers	23	6	5	12

Competition	Matches	Sydney wins	Draws	Wanderers wins	Sydney goals	Wanderers goals
A-League Men	44	21	11	12	73	51
FFA/Australia Cup	1	1	0	0	3	0
Total	45	22	11	12	76	51

== Records ==
- Most wins: 22, Sydney FC
- Biggest win: Western Sydney Wanderers 0–5 Sydney FC (9 December 2017)
- Most consecutive wins: 5; Sydney FC (9 December 2017 – 15 December 2018)
- Longest undefeated run: 9; Sydney FC (8 March 2014 – 14 January 2017)
- Highest-scoring match: Western Sydney Wanderers 3–4 Sydney FC (28 February 2015)
- Highest attendance (A-League Men record): 61,880; Western Sydney Wanderers 0–4 Sydney FC (8 October 2016)
- Lowest attendance: 10,091; Sydney 3–2 Wanderers (3 April 2022; excluding closed door matches)

== All-time top scorers ==
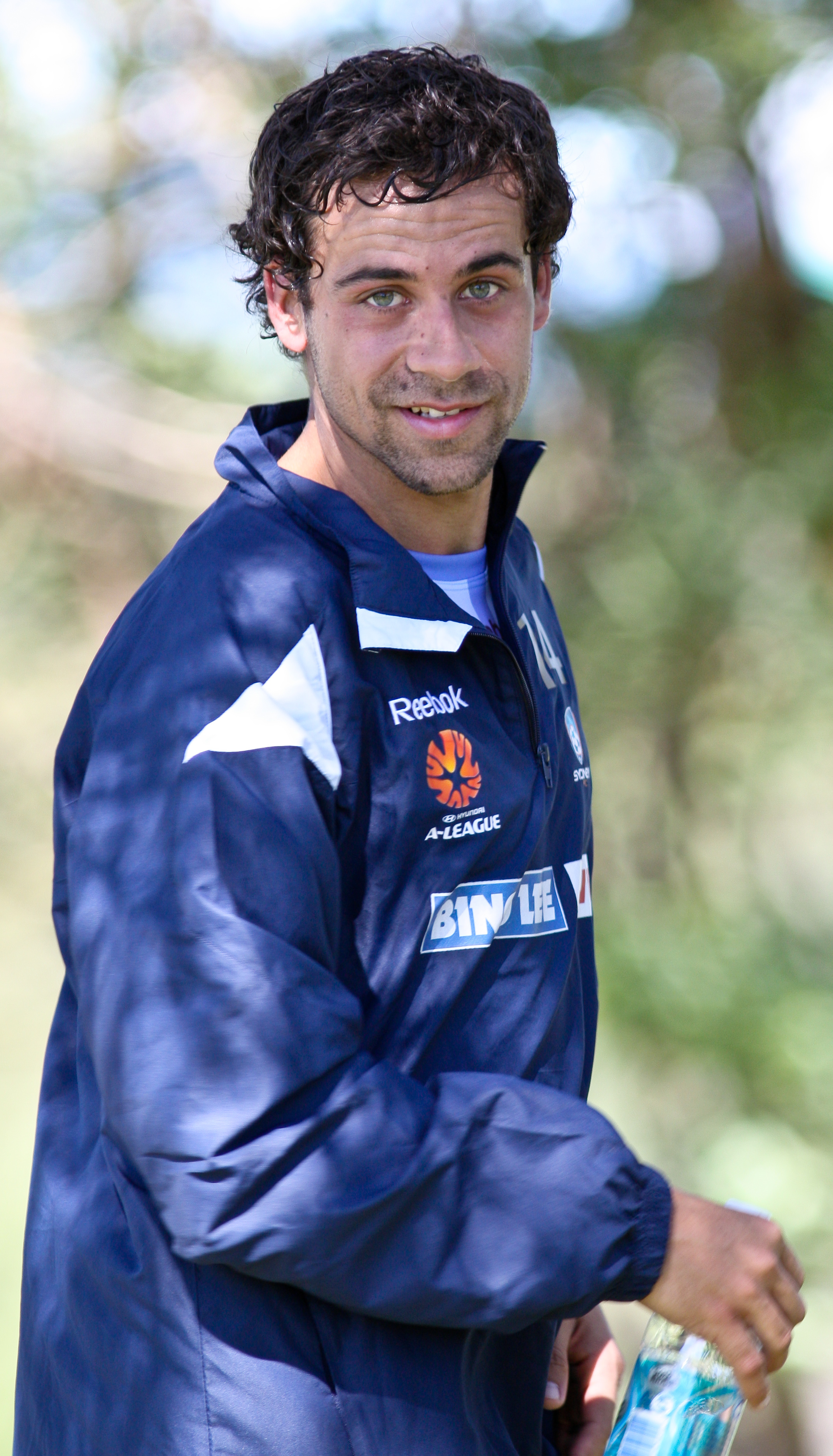
Alex Brosque is the Sydney Derby's all-time top goalscorer, with 6 goals

As of 11 April 2026

Rank	Player	Club	Goals
1	(Australia) Alex Brosque	Sydney	6
2	(Brazil) Bobô	Sydney	5
2	(England) Adam Le Fondre	Sydney	5
2	(Australia) Zac Sapsford	Wanderers	5
5	(Poland) Adrian Mierzejewski	Sydney	4
6	(Australia) Mitchell Duke	Wanderers	3
6	(Brazil) Fábio Gomes	Sydney	3
6	(Poland) Patryk Klimala	Sydney	3
6	(Spain) Oriol Riera	Wanderers	3
10	Multiple players		2

== Players who played for both clubs ==
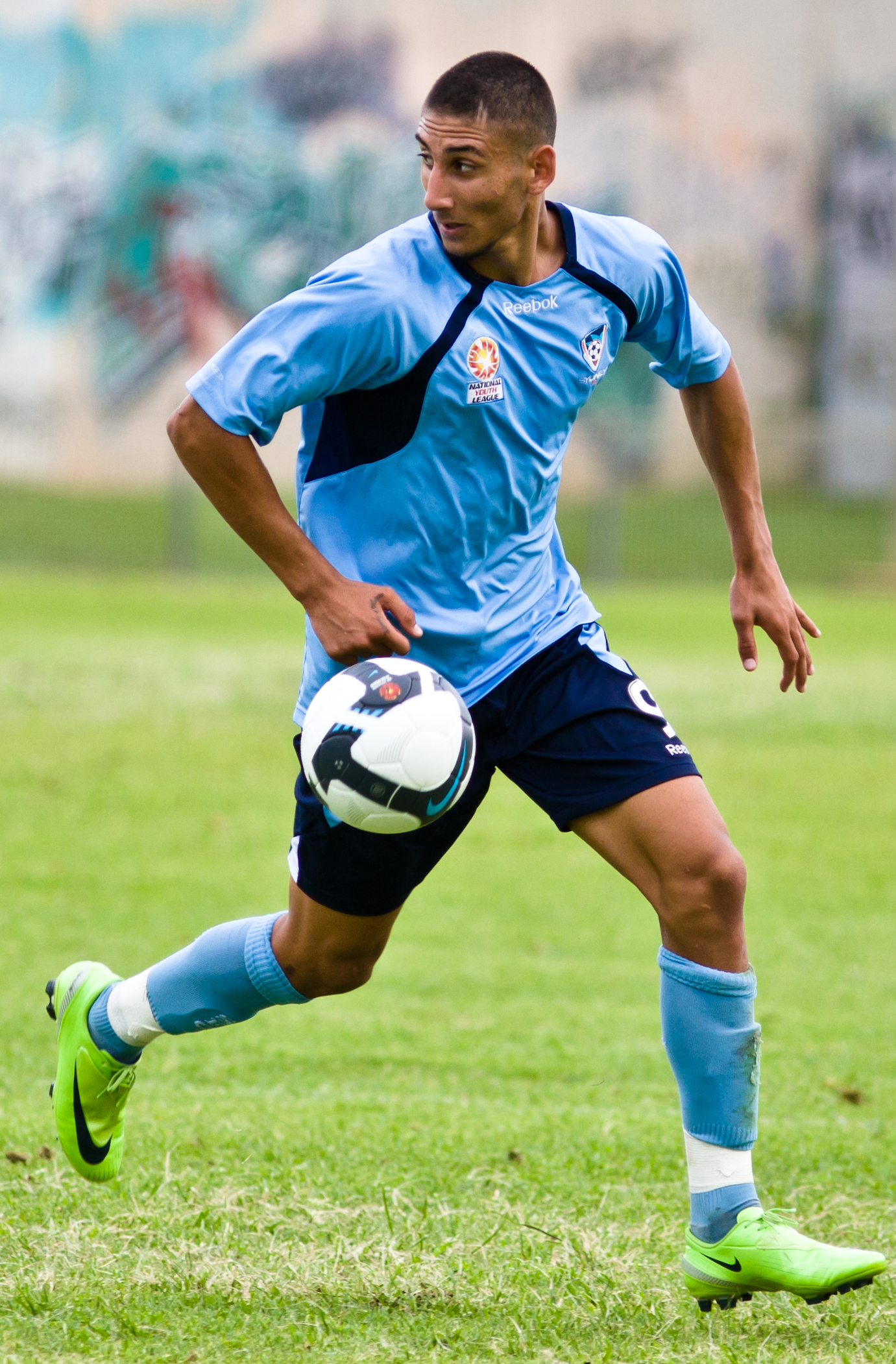
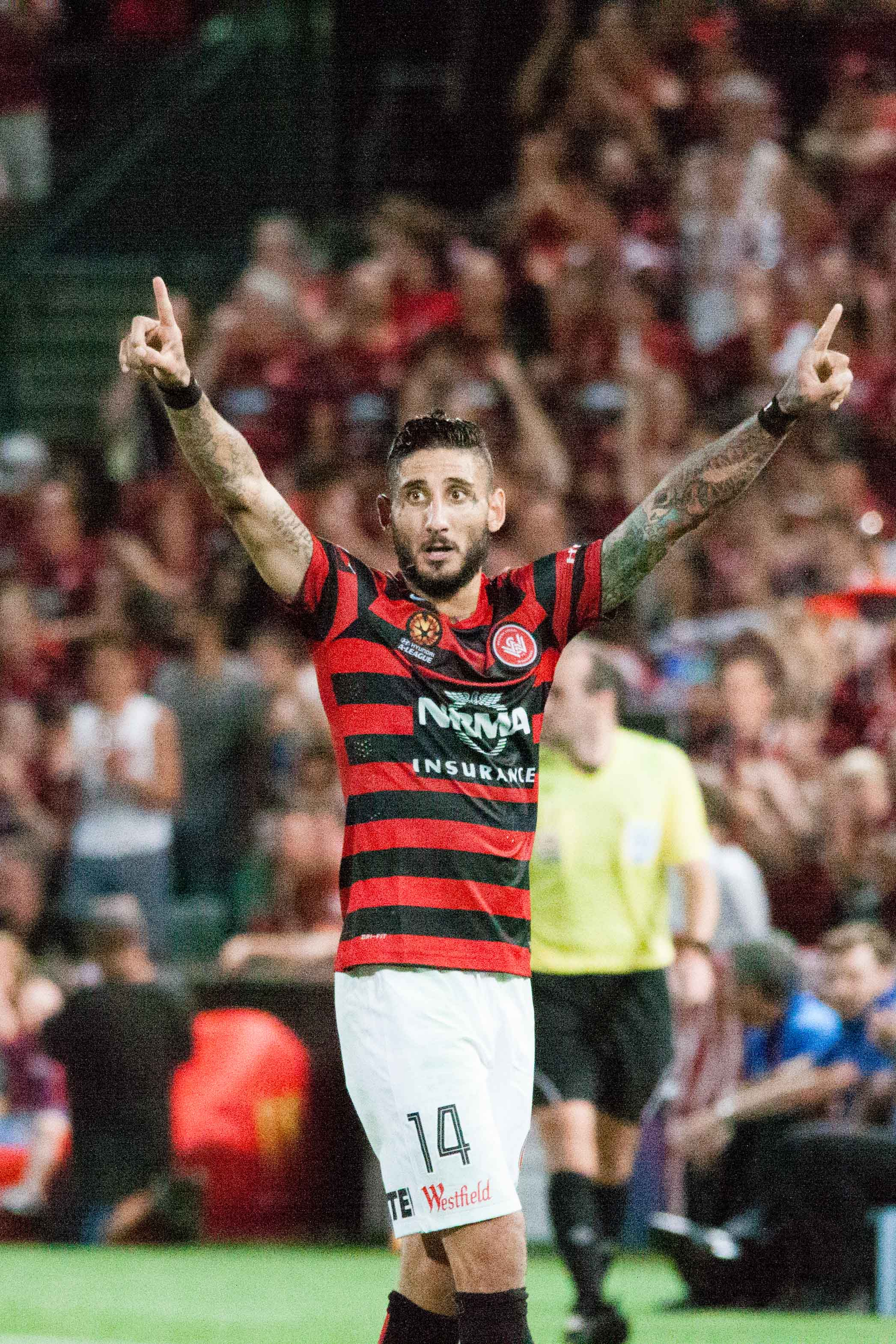
Kerem Bulut represented the Sydney FC youth team, before going on to represent the Western Sydney Wanderers

Sixteen players have played for both Sydney FC and Western Sydney Wanderers, sometimes through direct transfer and sometimes after many years. However, only four players have represented both clubs in derby games. These players are Vedran Janjetovic, Terry Antonis, Andrew Redmayne and Miloš Ninković. The remaining twelve players all had careers at Sydney FC prior to the formation of the Wanderers in 2012. This includes three players who did not cap for Sydney FC's first team.

Kerem Bulut did not cap for the first team, though he played for the Sydney FC youth team (2008–2010) before joining Wanderers in 2015. Josh Macdonald did not cap for the first team, though he also played for the Sydney FC youth team (2012–2014) before joining Wanderers in 2015. Kearyn Baccus did not cap for the first team, though he played for the Sydney FC youth team (2008–2009) before joining the Wanderers in 2014. Current Sydney FC players Tom Heward-Belle and Patrick Yazbek were previously members of the Wanderers' youth teams, without capping for the senior team.

Wanderers inaugural head coach, Tony Popovic, previously played for Sydney from 2007 to 2008, and served as an assistant coach from 2009 to 2011, before he became the manager of the Wanderers in 2012.

Joshua Brillante is the most recent player to join the Wanderers after leaving Melbourne Victory. On 2 January 2017, goalkeeper Andrew Redmayne became the first player to join Sydney FC from the Wanderers.

- **Bold** indicates players who are currently active
- Italics indicates players played for the youth team of their original team, but did not who did not cap for the first team

Player	Sydney			Wanderers			Total derbies Apps (Gls)
Player	Seasons	Apps (Gls)	Derbies	Seasons	Apps (Gls)	Derbies	Total derbies Apps (Gls)
Michael Beauchamp	2011–2012	28 (1)	0	2012–2014	37 (2)	4 (1)	4 (1)
Mark Bridge	2008–2012	85 (18)	0	2012–2016, 2017–2019	141 (38)	14 (1)	14 (1)
Shannon Cole	2007–2012	99 (8)	0	2012–2017	53 (2)	5 (1)	5 (1)
Joey Gibbs	2010	1 (0)	0	2012–2013	13 (2)	1 (0)	1 (0)
Antony Golec	2008–2011	10 (0)	0	2014–2015	17 (0)	2 (0)	2 (0)
Kerem Bulut	2008–2010	0	0	2015, 2016	15 (5)	2 (2)	2 (2)
Liam Reddy	2010–2012	43 (0)	0	2015–2016	6 (0)	1 (0)	1 (0)
Scott Jamieson	2010–2012	54 (1)	0	2015–2016	27 (0)	3 (0)	3 (0)
Brendon Santalab	2007–2009	27 (4)	0	2013–2018	97 (35)	10 (2)	10 (2)
Nikolai Topor-Stanley	2006–2007	20 (1)	0	2012–2016	104 (3)	12 (0)	12 (0)
Kearyn Baccus	2008–2009	0	0	2014–2018	62 (0)	7 (0)	7 (0)
Josh Macdonald	2008–2009	0	0	2015–2016	2 (0)	0	0
Vedran Janjetović	2012–2016	112 (0)	10 (0)	2017–2022	72 (0)	8 (0)	18 (0)
Terry Antonis	2010–2015	72 (5)	7 (1)	2017, 2021–2023	36 (4)	3 (0)	10 (1)
Andrew Redmayne	2017–2025	238 (0)	23 (0)	2015–2017	37 (0)	3 (0)	26 (0)
Alexander Baumjohann	2019–2021	60 (1)	6 (0)	2018–2019	17 (3)	3 (1)	9 (1)
Matthew Jurman	2008–2011, 2013–2017	118 (3)	11 (1)	2019–2020	24 (0)	3 (0)	14 (1)
Dimitri Petratos	2010–2012	30 (5)	0	2021–2022	25 (3)	3 (0)	3 (0)
Calem Nieuwenhof	2020–2022	17 (1)	0	2022–2023	27 (4)	4 (1)	4 (1)
Milos Ninkovic	2015–2022	221 (41)	20 (1)	2022–2024	38 (1)	5 (0)	25 (1)
Zac Sapsford	2022	0	0	2022–2025	48 (12)	6 (5)	6 (5)
Aidan Simmons	2016–2022	0	0	2022–2026	53 (2)	6 (0)	6 (0)
Jack Rodwell	2022–2024	25 (2)	2 (0)	2021–2022	15 (3)	2 (0)	4 (0)
Joshua Brillante	2016–2019	103 (3)	9 (1)	2023–present	73 (1)	5 (0)	14 (1)
Oscar Priestman	2021–2023	2	0 (0)	2023–2025	58 (2)	3 (0)	3 (0)
**Alex Gersbach**	2014–2016	34 (0)	3 (0)	2025–present	38 (2)	3 (0)	6 (0)
Jaushua Sotirio	2025	2 (0)	0 (0)	2013–2019	97 (13)	8 (0)	8 (0)
Kosta Barbarouses	2019–2022	77 (18)	8 (1)	2025–present	24 (5)	2 (0)	10 (1)
Jordan Swibel	2020–2021	11 (0)	1 (0)	2021–2022	2 (0)	0 (0)	1 (0)

== Played for one, managed the other ==
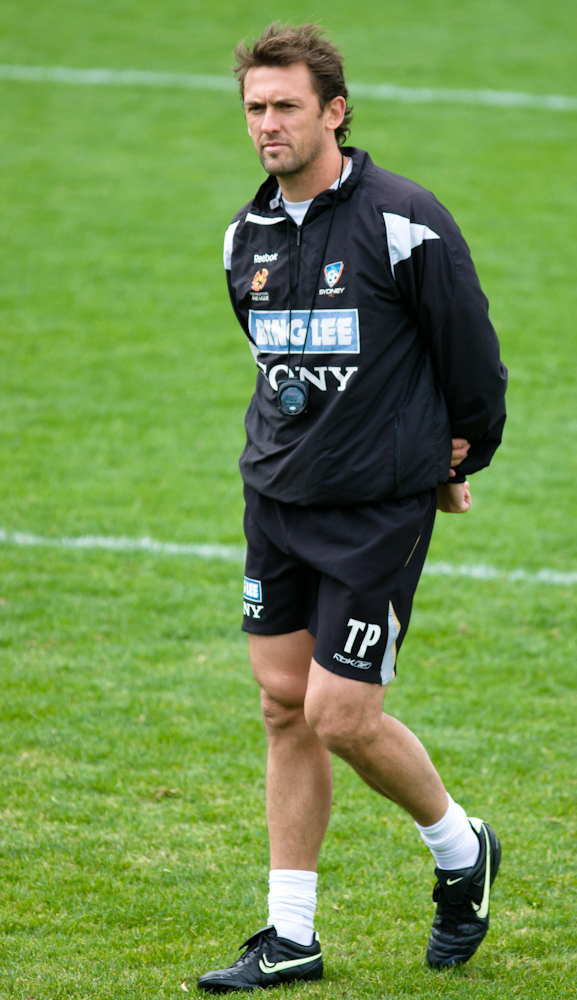
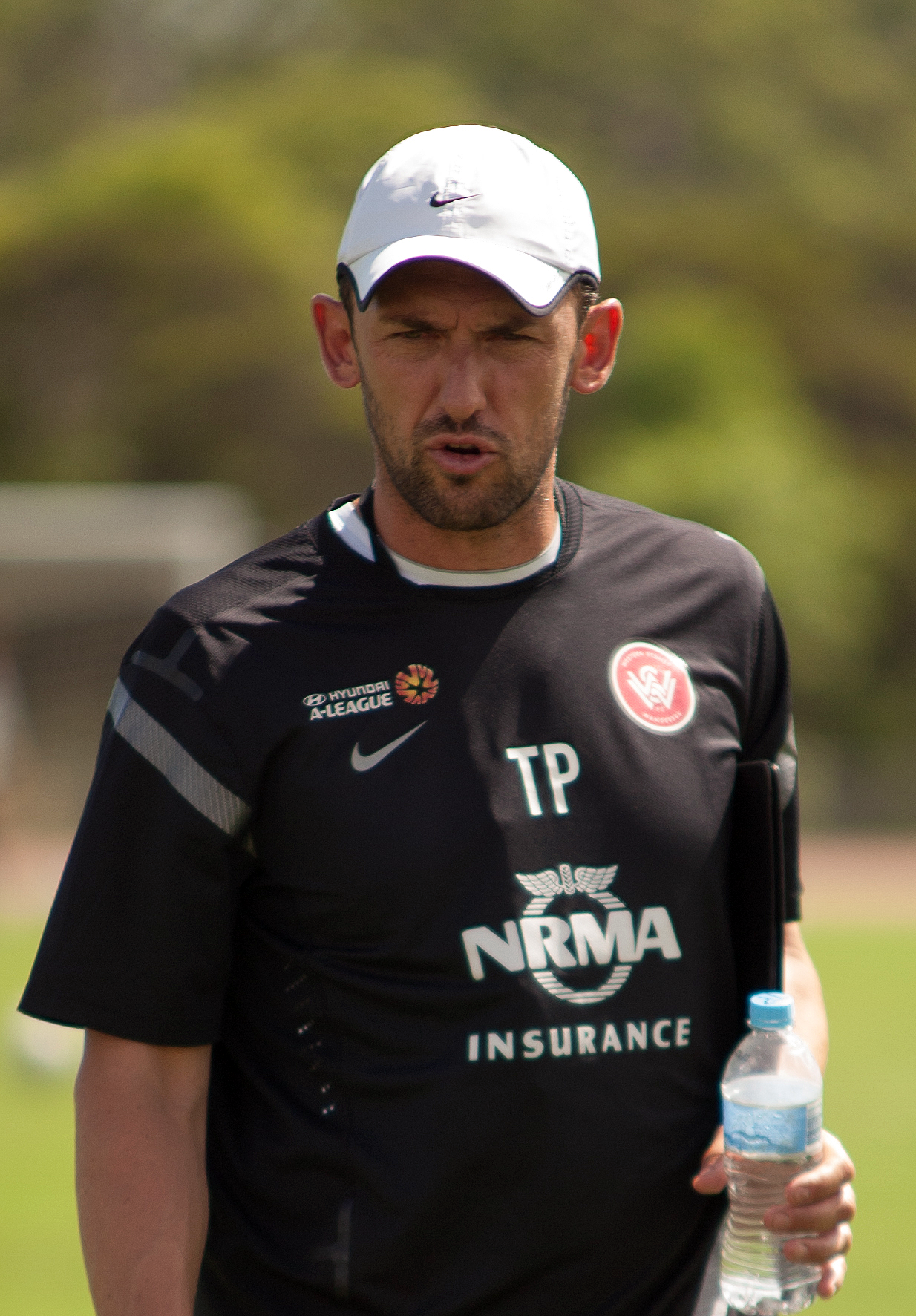
Tony Popovic was both a player and assistant coach with Sydney FC, before going on to manage the Western Sydney Wanderers

Manager	Played for				Managed						
Manager	Team	Span	League apps	League goals	Team	Span	G	W	D	L	Win %
Tony Popovic	Sydney FC	2007–2008	27	1	Western Sydney Wanderers	2012–2017	180	77	40	63	42.78
Marko Rudan	Sydney FC	2005–2007	71	6	Western Sydney Wanderers	2022–2024	77	29	18	30	37.66

== Managerial records ==
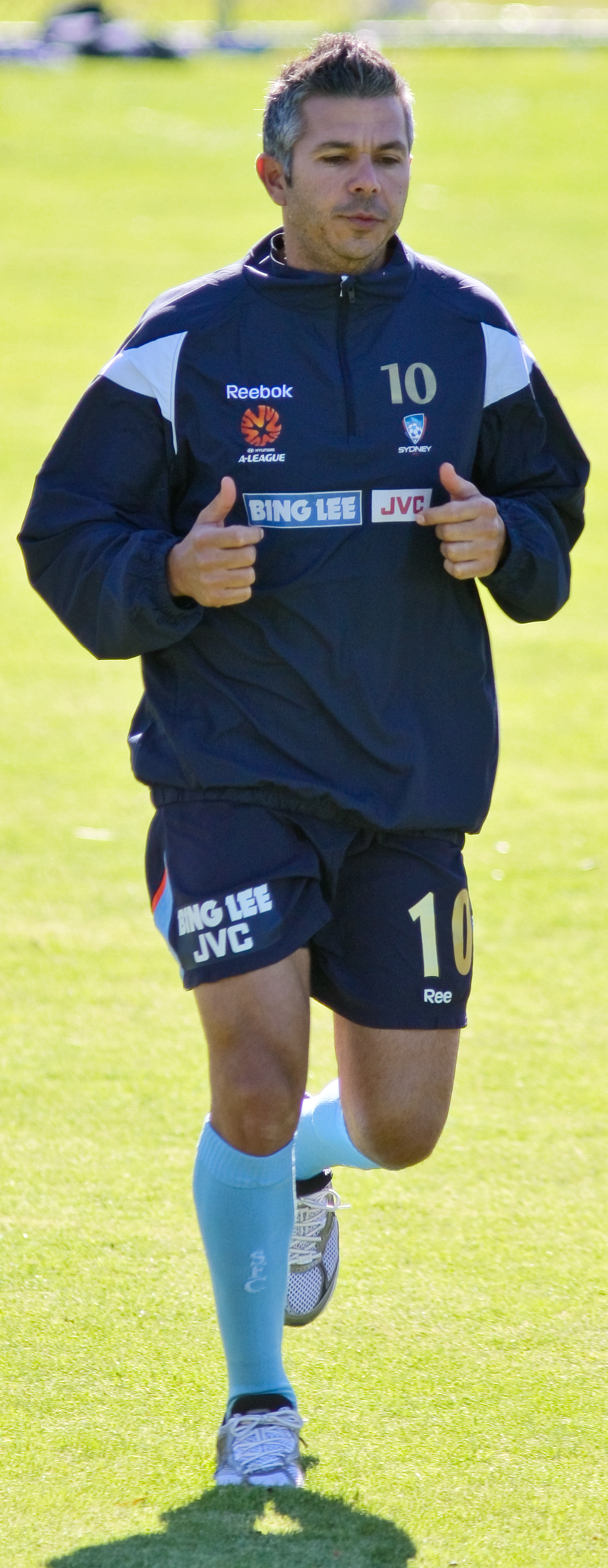
Steve Corica has managed the most Sydney Derbies of any manager, with 16 derbies managed

Manager	Club	Pld	W	D	L	GF	GA	GD	Pts	Win%
Graham Arnold	Sydney	12	7	4	1	26	12	+14	25	58.33
Steve Corica	Sydney	17	7	4	6	20	19	+1	25	41.18
Ufuk Talay	Sydney	8	5	1	2	19	11	+8	16	62.50
Tony Popovic	Wanderers	15	4	4	7	16	21	−5	16	26.67
Marko Rudan	Wanderers	9	4	0	5	13	12	+1	12	44.44
Carl Robinson	Wanderers	4	1	2	1	4	4	0	5	25.00
Patrick Kisnorbo	Sydney	2	1	1	0	2	0	+2	4	50.00
Jean-Paul de Marigny	Wanderers	2	1	1	0	2	1	+1	4	50.00
Alen Stajcic	Wanderers	4	1	1	2	7	9	−2	4	25.00
Frank Farina	Sydney	5	1	1	3	4	7	−3	4	20.00
Markus Babbel	Wanderers	5	1	1	3	3	9	−6	4	20.00
Ian Crook	Sydney	1	1	0	0	1	0	+1	3	100
Ufuk Talay	Wanderers	1	0	1	0	0	0	0	1	0
Gary Van Egmond	Wanderers	1	0	0	1	1	4	−3	0	0
Josep Gombau	Wanderers	2	0	0	2	1	8	−7	0	0

== Honours ==
As of 7 November 2027

SFC	Tournament	WSW
4	A-League Premiership	1
5	A-League Championship	0
2	Australia Cup	0
0	AFC Champions League	1
1	OFC Champions League*	0
12	Total	2

^{A-League Clubs can no longer qualify for the OFC Champions League}

== See also ==
- A-League Men rivalries
- List of association football rivalries
