= Alex Bonetig =

Australian soccer player (born 2002)

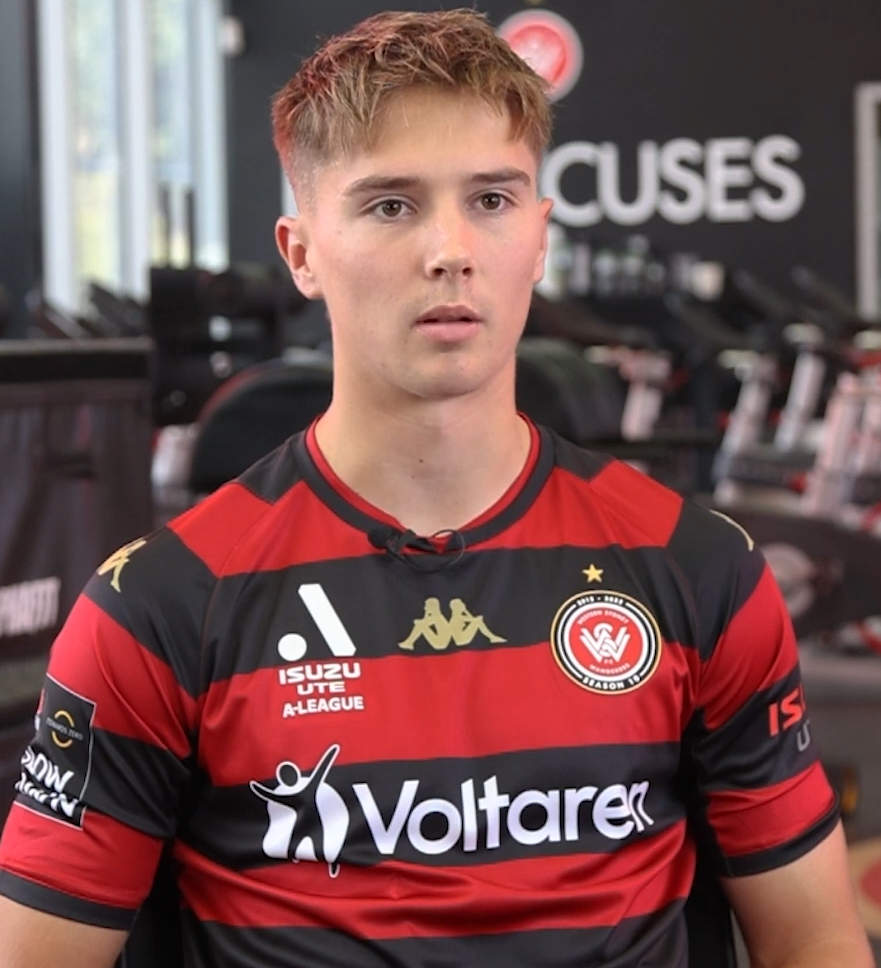
- Bonetig with Western Sydney Wanderers in 2022

Personal information
- Full name: Alexander Bonetig
- Date of birth: 20 August 2002 (age 24)
- Place of birth: Shellharbour, New South Wales, Australia
- Height: 1.87 m (6 ft 1 1/2 in)
- Position: Central defender

Team information
- Current team: Portland Timbers
- Number: 6

Youth career
- 2016–2023: Western Sydney Wanderers

Senior career*
Years	Team	Apps	(Gls)
2021–2024	Western Sydney Wanderers NPL	32	(0)
2023–2026	Western Sydney Wanderers	54	(0)
2026–	Portland Timbers	8	(1)

International career^{‡}
2025–	Australia	0	(0)
- * Club domestic league appearances and goals as of 13 May 2026 ‡ National team caps and goals as of 8 January 2026

Alexander Bonetig (/ˈbo.nə.tɪɡ/, BOH-nə-TIG; born 20 August 2002) is an Australian professional soccer player who plays as a central defender for Major League Soccer (MLS) club Portland Timbers and the Australia national team. He previously played for A-League Men club Western Sydney Wanderers.

== Club career ==
=== Youth career ===
Bonetig started playing soccer at the age of 4 for Shellharbour Junior FC. By the time he was 9, he had represented the Illawarra under-9s and SAP Southern Branch under-11s. In November 2012, Bonetig was selected by a soccer clinic in Sydney to travel and train with Everton Academy. He had the opportunity to meet Australian international Tim Cahill and attend a Premier League match at Goodison Park against Sunderland. Bonetig soon signed for Western Sydney Wanderers Youth in 2016.

=== Western Sydney Wanderers ===
Bonetig was promoted to the first-team after signing a two-year scholarship contract for Western Sydney Wanderers on 9 June 2022. He made his professional debut as a substitute on 22 January 2023 in a 1–1 draw to Newcastle Jets at McDonald Jones Stadium. Bonetig made two more league appearances as a substitute, which had him feature in a 4–0 Sydney Derby win.

Bonetig made his starting debut for Wanderers on 29 August 2023 in a 5–1 cup victory over Adelaide United. He was soon ruled out until December due to a broken bone in his foot, which was sustained in the opening league match against Wellington Phoenix. Bonetig extended his contract with the club through a three-year deal on 16 November 2023.

== Personal life ==
Bonetig was raised in Shellharbour, New South Wales. He has a younger brother, Liam, who plays for Celtic in Scotland. The two previously played together at Western Sydney Wanderers Youth. Bonetig's father, Mineo, was a former soccer player for Wollongong Wolves during their time in the National Soccer League. He is also the cousin of Macarthur FC player Oliver Randazzo.

Both Alex and Liam attended Edmund Rice College in Wollongong. Alex was awarded the 2020 Sportsman of the Year Award by his school in their Year 12 Graduation.
