= Oliver Bozanic =

Australian association football player

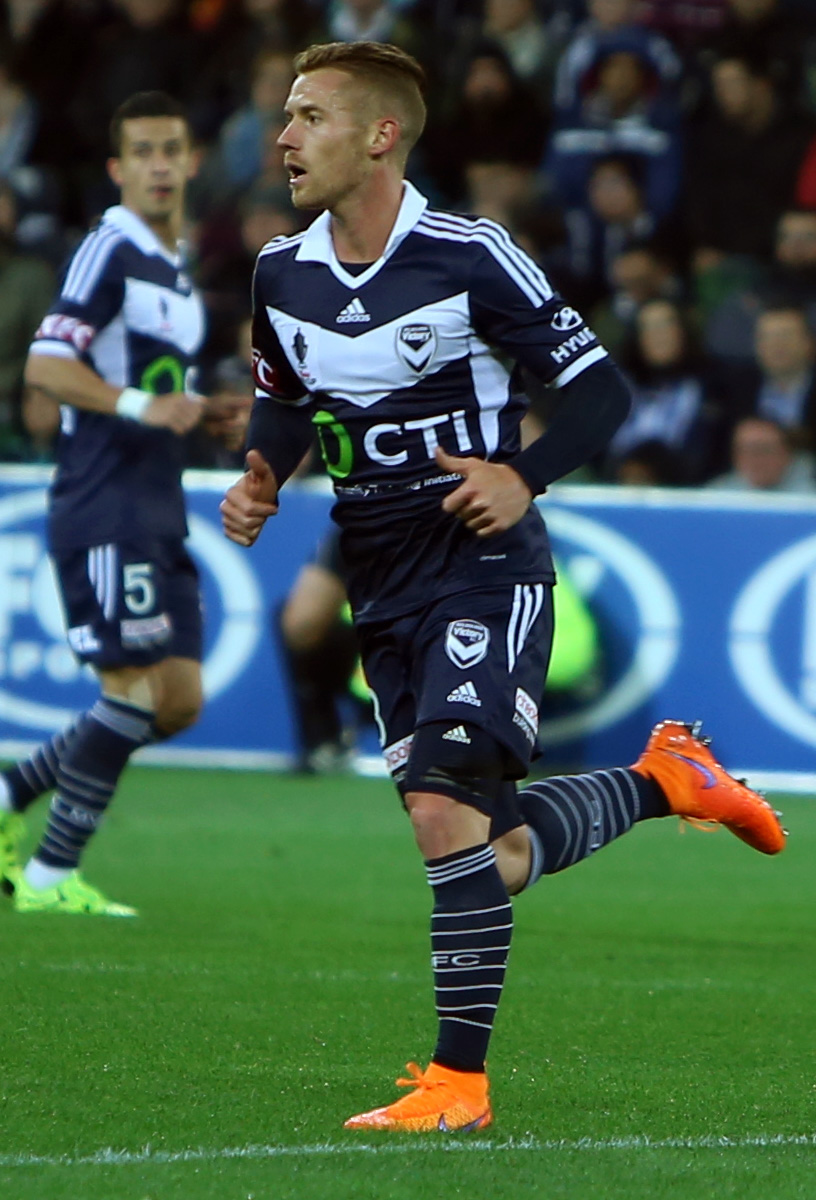
- Bozanic playing for Melbourne Victory in the FFA Cup, September 2015

Personal information
- Full name: Oliver John Bozanic
- Date of birth: 8 January 1989 (age 37)
- Place of birth: Sydney, Australia
- Height: 1.79 m (5 ft 10 in)
- Position: Central midfielder

Youth career
- Avoca FC
- Parramatta Eagles
- 2004–2005: Blacktown City Demons
- 2005–2006: NSWIS
- 2006–2007: Central Coast Mariners
- 2007: Reading

Senior career*
Years	Team	Apps	(Gls)
2006	Central Coast Mariners	0	(0)
2007–2010	Reading	0	(0)
2009	→ Woking (loan)	18	(2)
2009	→ Cheltenham Town (loan)	4	(0)
2009–2010	→ Aldershot Town (loan)	25	(2)
2010–2013	Central Coast Mariners	70	(3)
2013–2015	Luzern	51	(6)
2015–2017	Melbourne Victory	48	(5)
2017	Ventforet Kofu	10	(0)
2018	Melbourne City	9	(0)
2018–2020	Heart of Midlothian	43	(6)
2020–2022	Central Coast Mariners	39	(7)
2022–2024	Western Sydney Wanderers	16	(3)
2023	→ Perth Glory (loan)	9	(1)

International career
2006–2009	Australia U-20	17	(2)
2010–2012	Australia U-23	13	(0)
2013–2015	Australia	7	(0)
- * Club domestic league appearances and goals

Oliver John Bozanic (born 8 January 1989) is a former Australian footballer who played as a midfielder.

Bozanic was born in Sydney but started his professional career in England before returning to play for Central Coast Mariners in the A-League. He joined Swiss club Luzern in 2013. After spells with Melbourne Victory, Ventforet Kofu, Melbourne City and Heart of Midlothian, Bozanic returned to the Mariners in 2020.

Described as "versatile and energetic", Bozanic is able to play as an attacking midfielder or in a deeper central role. Bozanic has made seven appearances for the Australia national team, including two at the 2014 FIFA World Cup.

== Early life ==
Bozanic was born in Sydney, New South Wales. He is the son of former Socceroo Vic Bozanic who was part of the West Adelaide team which won the 1978 National Soccer League. His early years were spent on the Central Coast of NSW where he played with the small Avoca club, He played football for Sydney Olympic FC at the age of 12.

== Club career ==
=== Central Coast Mariners ===
Bozanic started his professional career with Australian A-League side Central Coast Mariners, where he was one of the locals drafted into the Mariners squad by team manager Lawrie McKinna, during the 2006–07 Pre-Season Cup as cover for a host of long-term injuries.

=== Reading ===
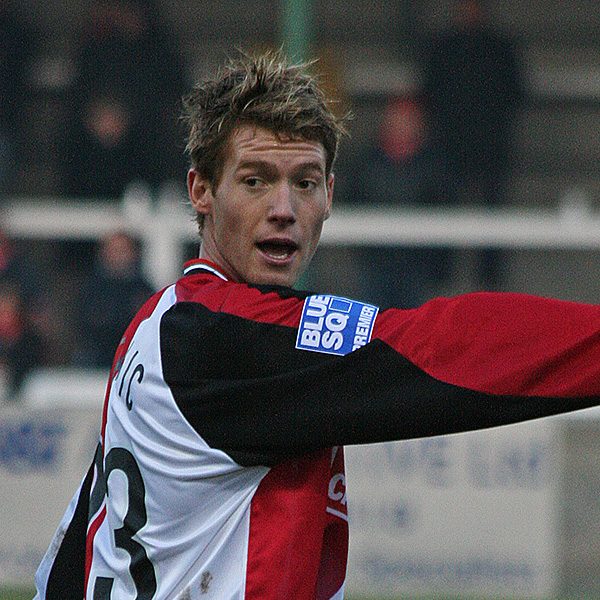
Bozanic playing for Woking in 2009

Bozanic joined Reading on a two-and-a-half-year contract on 29 January 2007. Bozanic played for both the under 18s and reserves at Reading during his first 18 months at the club, and was a crucial part of the side that won the Reserve League title in the 2006–07 season. On 23 January 2009, he signed for Woking on loan for one month. His loan spell with Woking was extended until the end of the season. At the end of the season, Bozanic signed a one-year contract with the club.

During pre-season of 2009–10, Bozanić joined Cheltenham Town on loan and made his first team debut in Cheltenham's 2–1 home win against Grimsby Town on 8 August 2009. But in late-August, Bozanic soon sustained a knee injury and after three months out with an injury, Bozanic's loan spell with Cheltenham Town had come to an end. Shortly after, on 26 November 2009, Bozanic joined former Reading assistant manager Kevin Dillon at League Two team Aldershot Town on a one-month loan deal. On 5 January 2010, it was announced that Bozanic would spend another month at Aldershot Town, after having his loan spell extended. In April 2010, Bozanic was recalled by the club, having his loan spell at Aldershot Town cut.

=== Central Coast Mariners (second spell) ===
After being released by Reading at the end of the 2009–10 season, Bozanic returned to Australia to rejoin Central Coast Mariners. Bozanic made his debut for the club, in the opening game of the season, in a 1–0 win over debut club Melbourne Heart. Following his debut, Bozanic quickly earned himself in the first team and made an impressive display for the club. The club qualified for the A-League Finals Series, where he scored his first goal, in a 2–2 draw against Brisbane Roar. Then, in the Grand Final against the Brisbane Roar again, Bozanic scored in extra-time, at the 103rd minute, which seemed to be a winning goal until the opposition team scored in the last minutes, leading to go on penalty shoot-out, when the club lost 4–2.

In the 2011–12 season, Bozanic featured only twenty times, due to international commitments for the national team. On his twenty-third birthday, on 8 January 2012, Bozanic scored a winning goal, in a 1–0 win over Sydney. Throughout February, Bozanic was not featured at the club, due to international commitments for the national team at the qualifying campaign for London 2012, where he was captain, but it was successful. On 26 February 2012, Bozanic, along with goalkeeper Mathew Ryan, returned to the first team at the club. At the conclusion to the season, Bozanic helped the club to win the A-League 2011–12 season.

At the start of the 2012–13 season, Bozanic had not featured for six matches, due to an knee injury. Bozanic then made his return on 25 November 2012, in a 2–1 victory against Brisbane Roar. In mid-December, Bozanic suffered a head injury following a sickening head clash during a match against Newcastle Jets, which he resulted a concussion at the hospital. Bozanic was ruled out for a week. After three and a half week out, Bozanic made his return, where he set up the only goal for Bernie Ibini-Isei, in a 1–0 win against Perth Glory. On 28 March 2013, Bozanic signed a one-year contract extension with the club. At the conclusion to the season, Bozanic helped the club to win the A-League 2012–13 season, their second time in the row, and was featured in the A-League Grand Final, playing in defensive midfield with John Hutchinson, where they won 2–0 against Western Sydney Wanderers.

In June 2013, Bozanic was among three players to be linked with Asian clubs, having been attracted by South Korean sides Busan IPark and Pohang Steelers.

=== Luzern ===
On 14 June 2013, Bozanic signed a two-year deal to join Swiss Super League side Luzern. Thirty days later, Bozanic made his debut, in the opening game of the season, in a 2–0 win over Lausanne and scored his first goals in the next match, in a 4–2 loss against Aarau. Then, in the next match, Bozanic scored another brace in a 3–2 win over Zürich. Bozanic scored a winning a goal in the next match in a 1–0 win over Sion on 5 August 2013, thereby scoring five goals in three consecutive games.

=== Melbourne Victory ===
On 3 September 2015, Melbourne Victory announced the signing of Bozanic to a three-year marquee contract. He made his competitive debut 19 days later in a 3–1 win against Adelaide United in the 2015 FFA Cup Quarter Final, where he was involved in setting up his team's second goal.

=== Ventforet Kofu ===
On 16 March 2017, Melbourne Victory announced that Bozanic would be moving to Ventforet Kofu on a three-year deal. Bozanic still had one year left on his three-year marquee contract. On 4 December 2017, he was released from his contract with Ventforet.

=== Melbourne City ===
On 10 February 2018, Bozanic joined Melbourne City for the remainder of the season. He represented the club 9 times.

=== Hearts ===
Bozanic signed for Edinburgh club Hearts, of the Scottish Premiership, in June 2018. Bozanic spent two seasons at Hearts, where he made 43 appearances and scored 6 goals.

=== Central Coast Mariners (third spell) ===
Bozanic returned to the Mariners on 21 October 2020. Bozanic was named captain of the Mariners upon his return for his first season back. On 18 December 2021, Bozanic played his 100th A-League Men game for the Mariners, scoring a late free kick in a 2–0 win over Western Sydney Wanderers.

Bozanic's third stint at the Central Coast Mariners lasted two seasons, both as captain. However, midway through the second season, he was frozen out by coach Nick Montgomery and did not feature in the last 12 games of the season for the Mariners. He was released by the club at the end of the season.

=== Western Sydney Wanderers ===
After leaving the Mariners, Bozanic signed for their New South Wales rivals Western Sydney Wanderers. Bozanic made his debut for the Wanderers on 10 December 2022 against Wellington Phoenix, and scored his first goal for the club against Brisbane Roar in his third appearance.

Bozanic's second season at the Wanderers begun with a half season loan to Perth Glory. Bozanic's contract with the Wanderers was mutually terminated shortly after returning from his loan spell.

==== Perth Glory (loan) ====
On 13 September 2023, Perth Glory announced the signing of Bozanic on loan until January 2024. While the deal was initially signed with a view to the transfer becoming a permanent one, Perth Glory were unable to recruit players in the January 2024 transfer window due to being in administration, meaning they could not extend or make permanent Bozanic's loan. Bozanic played 9 matches for Perth, scoring 1 goal.

=== Retirement ===
After 10 months as a free agent following his release from the Western Sydney Wanderers, Bozanic announced his retirement from football on his Instagram page on 17 November 2024.

== International career ==
Bozanic was a member of the Australian 2009 FIFA U-20 World Cup development squad, which competed in and won a four-team tournament in Japan against the under-20 teams of Hungary and Japan in 2006. He was a member of all the lead-up squads prior for the 2009 FIFA U-20 World Cup, but missed out on his place at the tournament due to injury.

He received his first full international call up in August 2009 for a friendly international against the Republic of Ireland. Bozanic was again included in a 50-man preliminary squad for the 2011 Asian Cup.

Bozanic was captain of the Olyroos in their unsuccessful qualifying campaign for London 2012.

In October 2013, Bozanic made his debut for the Socceroos, coming off the bench in a win over Canada.

Bozanic was selected in the Australian squad for the 2014 FIFA World Cup, and played in Group Stage matches against Netherlands and Spain.

== Personal life ==
Bozanic and his wife have three daughters. Bozanic is the older brother of former Central Coast United FC midfielder Louis Bozanic.

== Career statistics ==
As of 7 May 2023

Club	Season	League			Cup		Continental		Total	
Club	Season	Division	Apps	Goals	Apps	Goals	Apps	Goals	Apps	Goals
Central Coast Mariners	2006–07	A-League	0	0	2	0	0	0	2	0
Reading	2007–08	Premier League	0	0	0	0	0	0	0	0
Woking (loan)	2008–09	Conference National	18	2	0	0	0	0	18	2
Cheltenham Town (loan)	2009–10	Football League Two	4	0	0	0	0	0	4	0
Aldershot Town (loan)	2009–10	Football League Two	25	2	2	1	0	0	27	3
Central Coast Mariners	2010–11	A-League	33	2	0	0	0	0	33	2
Central Coast Mariners	2011–12	A-League	23	1	0	0	5	0	28	1
Central Coast Mariners	2012–13	A-League	15	0	0	0	7	0	22	0
Central Coast Mariners	Total		71	3	0	0	12	0	85	3
FC Luzern	2013–14	Swiss Super League	28	5	4	2	0	0	32	7
FC Luzern	2014–15	Swiss Super League	23	1	1	0	2	0	19	1
FC Luzern	Total		51	6	5	2	2	0	51	8
Melbourne Victory	2015–16	A-League	27	4	3	1	8	0	38	5
Melbourne Victory	2016–17	A-League	21	1	4	1	0	0	25	2
Melbourne Victory	Total		48	5	7	2	8	0	63	7
Ventforet Kofu	2017	J1 League	10	0	4	1	0	0	14	1
Melbourne City	2017–18	A-League	9	0	0	0	0	0	9	0
Heart of Midlothian	2018–19	Scottish Premiership	25	3	9	0	0	0	34	3
Heart of Midlothian	2019–20	Scottish Premiership	18	3	8	1	0	0	26	4
Heart of Midlothian	Total		43	6	17	1	0	0	60	7
Central Coast Mariners	2020–21	A-League	24	3	0	0	0	0	24	3
Central Coast Mariners	2021–22	A-League	15	4	4	1	0	0	19	5
Central Coast Mariners	Total		39	7	4	1	0	0	31	4
Western Sydney Wanderers	2022–23	A-League Men	16	3	0	0	0	0	16	3
Perth Glory (loan)	2023–24	A-League Men	9	1	0	0	0	0	9	1
Career total			343	35	41	8	22	0	384	43

== Honours ==
=== Club ===
Central Coast Mariners

- A-League Premiership: 2011–12
- A-League Championship: 2012–13

Melbourne Victory

- FFA Cup: 2015

=== International ===
Australia national football team

- AFF U-19 Youth Championship: 2006

=== Individual ===
- Swiss Super League Player of the Month: August 2013
