= Aidan Simmons =

Australian football player (born 2003)

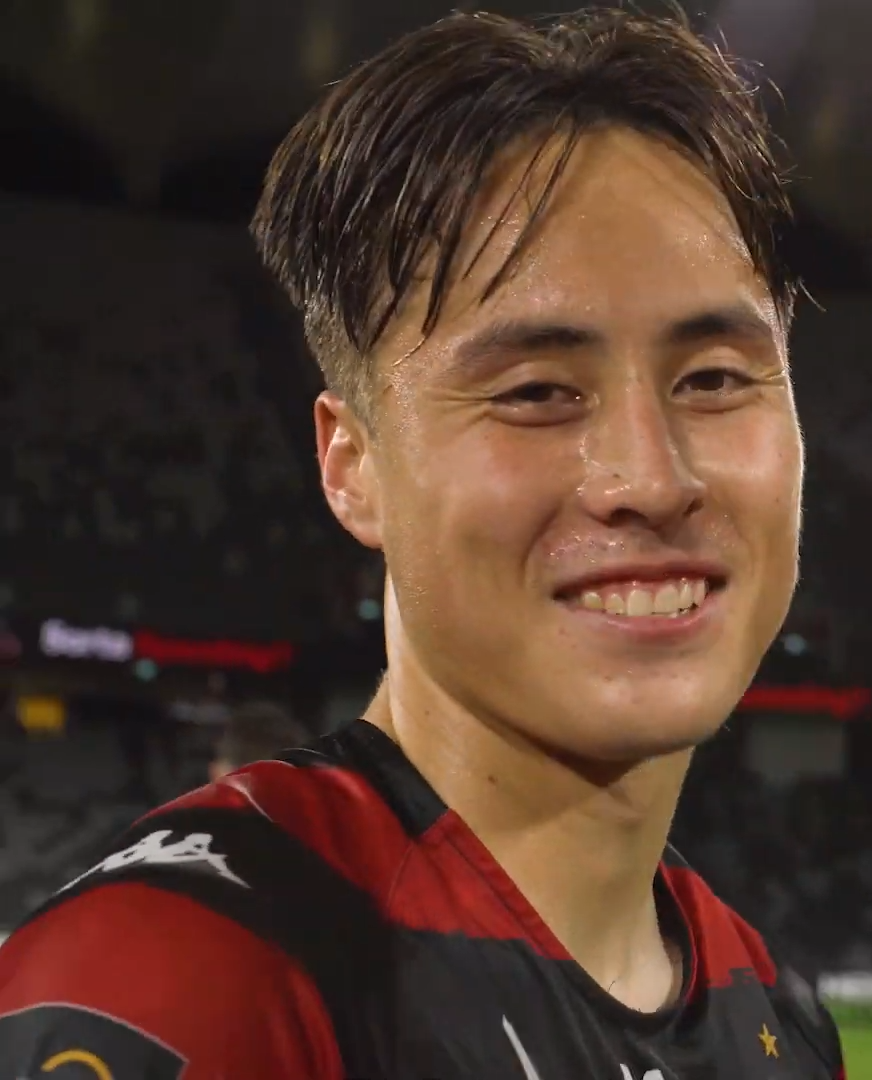
- Simmons with Western Sydney Wanderers in 2023

Personal information
- Date of birth: 26 May 2003 (age 23)
- Place of birth: Australia
- Position: Right back

Team information
- Current team: Tochigi City

Youth career
- St George FC
- 2016–2022: Sydney FC

Senior career*
Years	Team	Apps	(Gls)
2020–2022	Sydney FC NPL	34	(1)
2022–2025	Western Sydney Wanderers NPL	25	(4)
2022–2026	Western Sydney Wanderers	48	(2)
2026–	Tochigi City	0	(0)

International career^{‡}
2023	Australia U20	2	(1)
2025–	Australia U23	3	(1)
- * Club domestic league appearances and goals as of 28 May 2026 ‡ National team caps and goals as of 7 September 2025

Aidan Simmons (born 26 May 2003) is an Australian soccer player who plays as a right back for J2 League club Tochigi City.

== Club career ==
=== Western Sydney Wanderers ===
On 9 June 2022, Simmons signed his first professional contract, joining A-League Men club Western Sydney Wanderers on a two-year deal from cross-town rivals Sydney FC. He made his senior debut as a substitute on 18 December, replacing Brandon Borrello in the 64th minute of a 1–0 defeat to Western United. On 21 April 2023, Simmons scored his first goal for the club, opening the score to an eventual 4–0 victory over Wellington Phoenix at CommBank Stadium. Simmons left the club at the end of the 2025–26 season to pursue an overseas opportunity, later revealed to be in Japan.

=== Tochigi City ===
During the 2026 season, Simmons signed for J2 League club Tochigi City.

== International career ==
Simmons was selected for the Australian U-20 national team to play in the 2023 AFC U-20 Asian Cup. He played in the first group game losing 1-0 to Vietnam. He started again against Iran where he scored the opening goal of the game, slotting it easily in the net, the game ended in a 3-2 win for Australia.
