= Morgan Schneiderlin =

French footballer (born 1989)

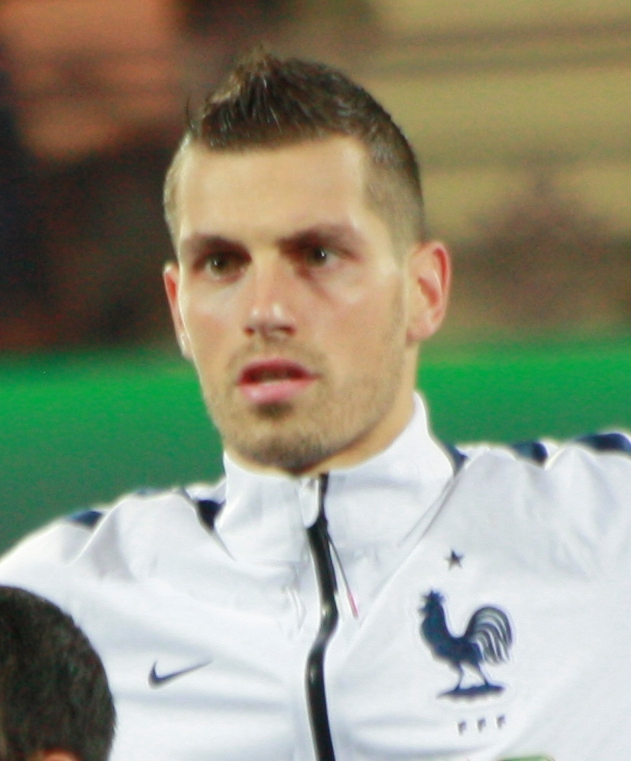
- Schneiderlin with France in 2014

Personal information
- Full name: Morgan Fernand Gérard Schneiderlin
- Date of birth: 8 November 1989 (age 37)
- Place of birth: Obernai, France
- Height: 1.86 m (6 ft 1 in)
- Position: Defensive midfielder

Youth career
- 1995–2005: Strasbourg

Senior career*
| Years | Team | Apps | (Gls) |
| 2005–2008 | Strasbourg B | 37 | (5) |
| 2006–2008 | Strasbourg | 5 | (0) |
| 2008–2015 | Southampton | 231 | (14) |
| 2015–2017 | Manchester United | 32 | (1) |
| 2017–2020 | Everton | 73 | (1) |
| 2020–2023 | Nice | 48 | (0) |
| 2023 | → Western Sydney Wanderers (loan) | 12 | (2) |
| 2023 | Konyaspor | 0 | (0) |
| 2023–2024 | A.E. Kifisia | 9 | (1) |
| Total | | 447 | (24) |

International career
| 2004–2005 | France U16 | 6 | (0) |
| 2005–2006 | France U17 | 5 | (0) |
| 2006–2007 | France U18 | 2 | (0) |
| 2007–2008 | France U19 | 6 | (2) |
| 2009–2010 | France U20 | 9 | (1) |
| 2010 | France U21 | 3 | (1) |
| 2014–2015 | France | 15 | (0) |
Medal record
Men's football
Representing France
UEFA European Championship
| Runner-up | 2016 France |
- * Club domestic league appearances and goals

Morgan Fernand Gérard Schneiderlin (French pronunciation: [mɔʁgan ʃnedɛʁlɛ̃]; born 8 November 1989) is a French former professional footballer who played as a defensive midfielder.

Schneiderlin began his career with Strasbourg, before moving to England to join Southampton in June 2008. He made 261 appearances across all competitions in seven seasons at the club, and was in the teams which earned consecutive promotions to reach the Premier League. He joined Manchester United for a potential £27 million fee in July 2015, but left for Everton in January 2017 for a fee of up to £24 million. He joined Nice in June 2020.

After representing France at all levels from under-16 onwards, Schneiderlin made his senior international debut in 2014. He was included in their squads for the 2014 FIFA World Cup and UEFA Euro 2016.

== Club career ==
=== Strasbourg ===
Born in Obernai, Alsace, Schneiderlin started playing football with his friends at the SR Zellwiller football ground, but began his career later with the major regional club Strasbourg's youth ranks in 1995, after members of his family brought him to one of the club's scouting sessions when he was five years old. After 10 years moving through the youth ranks, he signed his first professional contract with the club in 2005 and debuted for the B-team later that year. In 2006, he made his professional debut with the senior side and would go on to make four more appearances for the club, before being sold following the club's relegation during the 2007–08 Ligue 1 season.

=== Southampton ===
Schneiderlin moved from Strasbourg to Championship club Southampton on 27 June 2008, having signed a four-year contract in a deal that could rise to €1.5 million (£1.2 million). He joined Southampton despite receiving an offer from local rivals Portsmouth, then a Premier League team. Schneiderlin made his debut in a 2–1 defeat away to Cardiff City on 9 August 2008. He scored his first goal for Southampton away against Bristol Rovers on 13 April 2010, with the match finishing in a 5–1 victory. Schneiderlin signed a new deal with Saints on 19 August 2011, to keep him at the club until the summer of 2014.

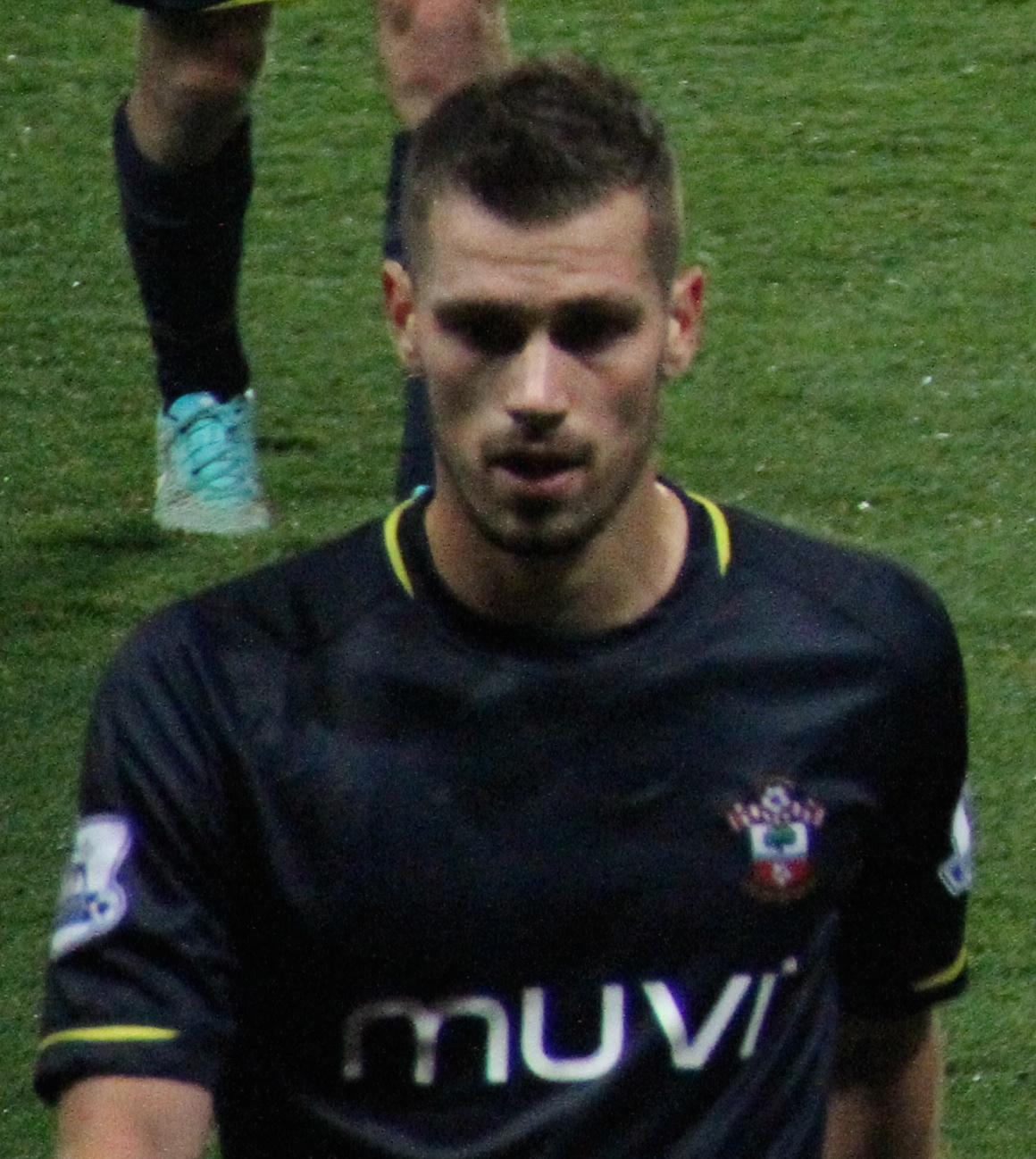
Schneiderlin playing for Southampton in 2014

After promotion to the Premier League in 2012, he kept his place in the side, playing the full 90 minutes of the opening game against Manchester City, a 3–2 away loss. On 2 September, he scored a goal against Manchester United, giving his side a 2–1 lead in a 3–2 loss. Schneiderlin followed this up with another home goal in a 1–1 draw with Swansea City on 10 November, trapping a Rickie Lambert header with his chest and then placing the ball past onrushing goalkeeper Gerhard Tremmel.

On 16 January 2013, he captained Southampton in a comeback which saw them draw 2–2 with European champions Chelsea at Stamford Bridge. He went on to score his third Premier League goal in a 2–2 draw with Wigan Athletic on 2 February, helping Southampton fight back from a goal down.

On 25 February 2013, Schneiderlin signed a new contract extension to keep him at Southampton until the summer of 2017. At the end of the season, Schneiderlin was credited for the most tackles, interceptions and highest work rate in the Premier League, establishing himself as one of the best defensive midfielders in England. He picked up both the Players' Player and Fans' Player of the Year awards at Southampton's end of season awards.

Schneiderlin scored twice in a 3–1 win at West Ham United on 30 August 2014, equalling his goal tally from the previous season's Premier League campaign. He scored his third goal of the season against Newcastle United on 13 September, curling in a late strike past goalkeeper Tim Krul, as the Saints won 4–0. On 28 December, he was sent off two minutes from the end of a 1–1 home draw against Chelsea. He suffered a knee injury against Tottenham on 25 April 2015, ruling him out for the remainder of the season.

=== Manchester United ===
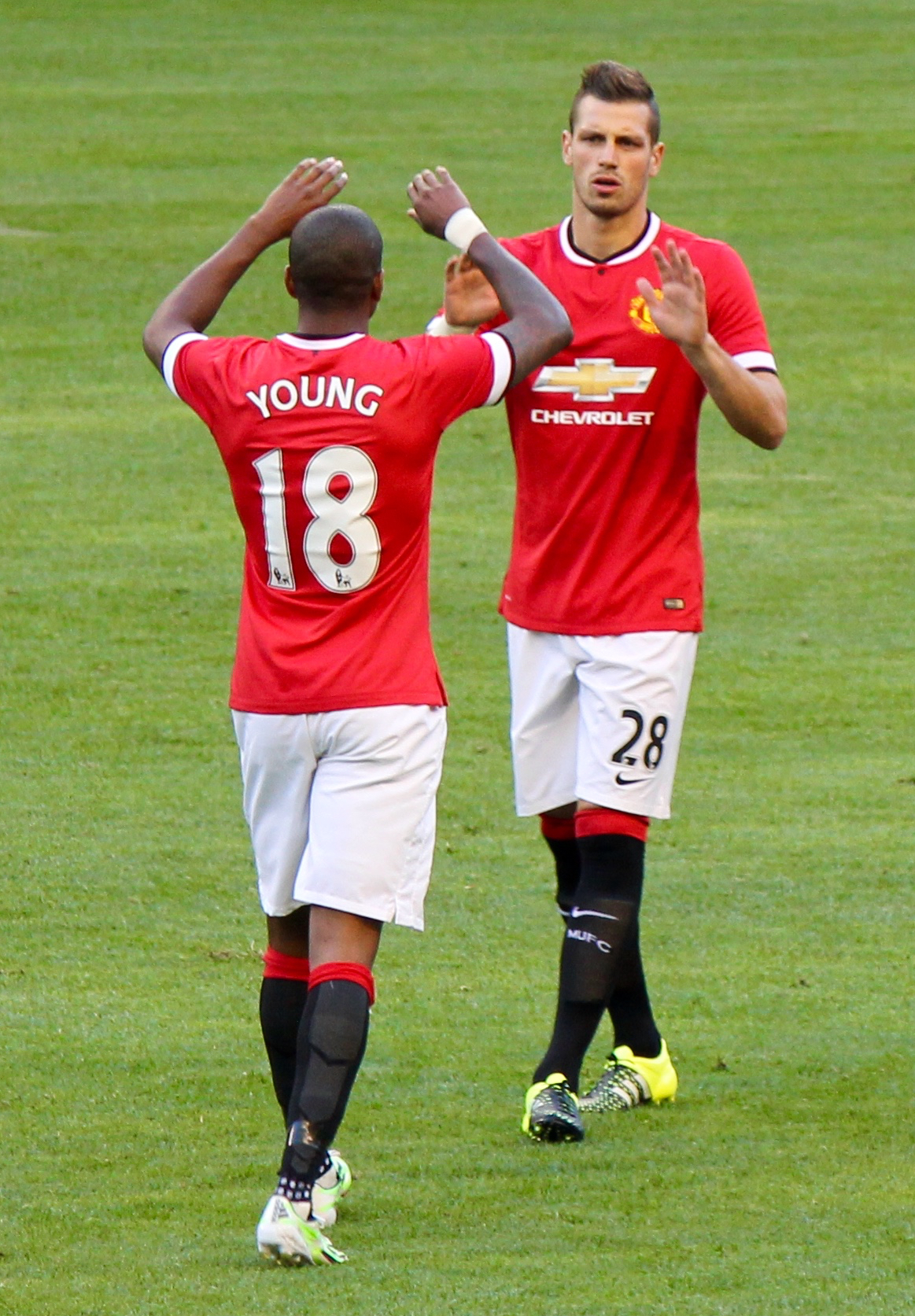
Schneiderlin (right) playing for Manchester United in 2015

After much speculation during the summer, Schneiderlin signed for Manchester United on 13 July 2015 for a fee in the region of £25 million. Upon signing for United, he said: "I am delighted to be a Manchester United player. Once I learned that United were interested in signing me, it was a very easy decision to make. I have enjoyed seven very happy years with Southampton and it’s a club that will always be in my heart. But the chance to be part of this squad to help this great club be successful was too good to miss."

On 17 July he made his debut, scoring the only goal – a header – as United beat Club América at CenturyLink Field in Seattle on their pre-season tour. He made his Premier League debut on 8 August as the season opened with a 1–0 victory against Tottenham Hotspur at Old Trafford, being chosen by BBC Sport as the best of United's five debutants that day. He scored what would be his only competitive goal for the club on 17 October, opening the scoring in a 3–0 league win away to Everton at Goodison Park. On 21 May, Schneiderlin was an unused substitute in the 2016 FA Cup Final as United beat Crystal Palace 2–1 at Wembley Stadium. He ended his first season with 38 appearances in all competitions, scoring once.

Schneiderlin was in the United squad that faced Leicester City in the 2016 FA Community Shield at Wembley Stadium on 7 August, winning 2–1. Due to competition in midfield, he played less frequently, with a total playing time of 147 minutes in three starts and five substitute appearances during the 2016–17 season. He was sold to Everton in the January transfer window due to a lack of playing time.

=== Everton ===
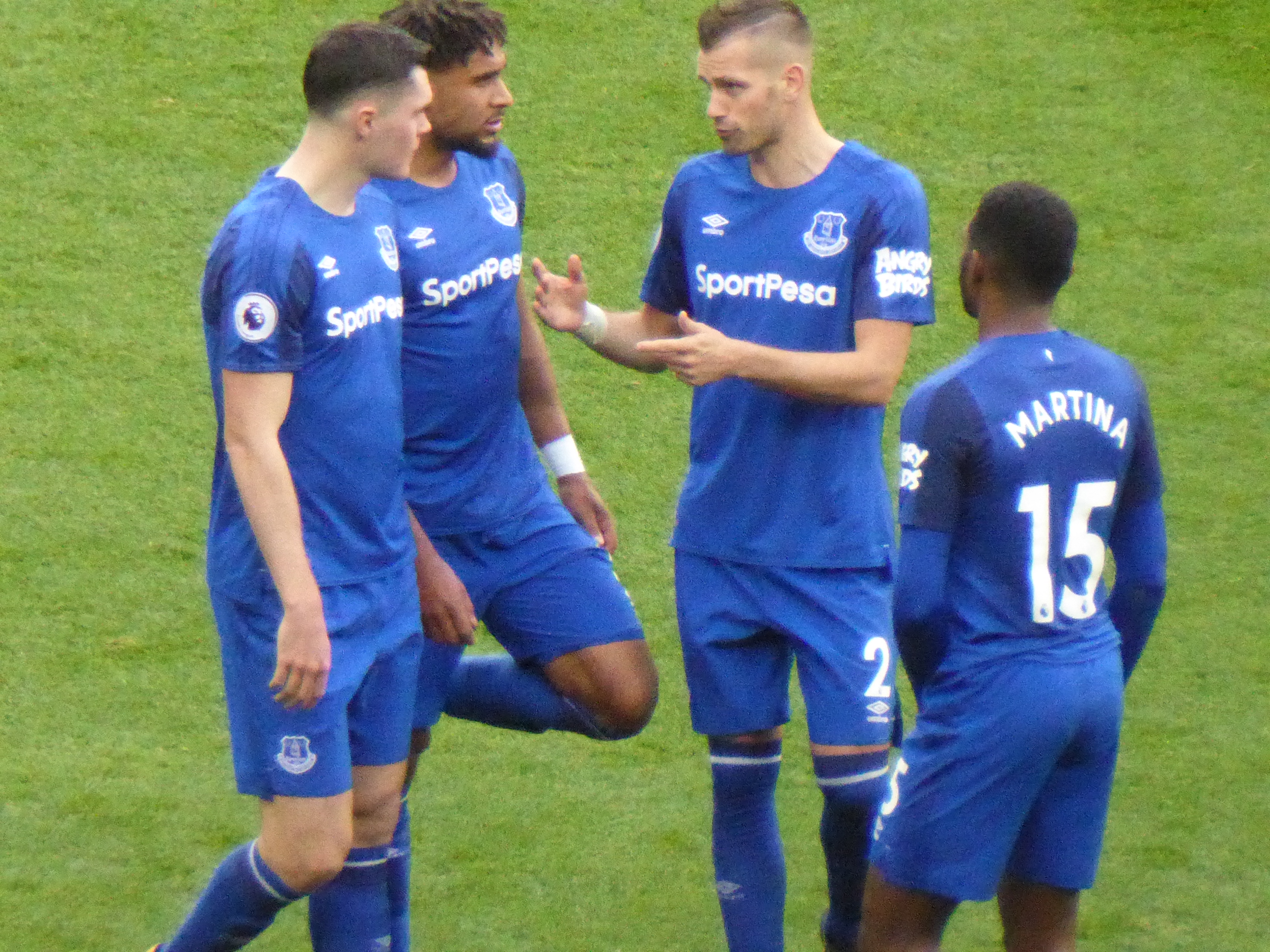
Schneiderlin (second from right) with Everton in 2017

On 12 January 2017, Schneiderlin signed a four-and-a-half-year contract with Everton, re-uniting with his former manager Ronald Koeman. The transfer fee was reported as £20 million, rising to £24 million. Schneiderlin made his debut for Everton three days later as a 65th-minute substitute for Kevin Mirallas against Manchester City in a 4–0 win at Goodison Park. He scored what would end up being his only goal in a 3–0 home victory over West Bromwich Albion on 11 March. Schneiderlin's transfer to Everton represented a real turnaround of fortunes for the player, becoming a starter in the defensive midfield role at the club.

Schneiderlin was sent off on 2 November 2017 as Everton lost 3–0 at Lyon, eliminating them from the UEFA Europa League group stage with two games to spare. In January 2018, West Ham wanted to sign him on loan. Schneiderlin struggled in the 2017–18 season under managers Ronald Koeman and Sam Allardyce, but was told by new boss Marco Silva in June 2018 that he had a future at Goodison Park.

In 2018–19, Schneiderlin did not start a game between October and February, with Silva saying that it was due to issues in his personal life.

Schneiderlin received a red card in the opening match of the 2019–20 season, a scoreless draw against Crystal Palace.

=== Nice ===
Schneiderlin signed for Nice for an undisclosed fee on 23 June 2020.

==== Western Sydney Wanderers (loan) ====
In the January transfer window of 2023, Schneiderlin signed on loan for Western Sydney Wanderers. Schneiderlin made 12 appearances for Western Sydney, scoring two goals including a penalty in the elimination final defeat to cross-town rivals Sydney. Schneiderlin left the club following that finals exit, with the expiration of his loan.

=== Konyaspor ===
In August 2023, Schneiderlin signed a two-year deal with Turkish club Konyaspor. However, ten days after signing, Schneiderlin’s contract was terminated by mutual agreement.

=== A.E. Kifisia ===
On 30 September 2023, Schneiderlin signed for Super League Greece club A.E. Kifisia. On 16 August 2024, he announced his retirement.

== International career ==
=== Youth ===
Schneiderlin represented France at under-16, under-17, under-18 whom he captained, and under-19 levels.

In March 2006, he was selected by France to play in the 2007 UEFA European Under-17 Championship elite round qualification campaign, his debut came against the Czech Republic. He played in two further games.

On 25 May 2009, he was selected in the under-20 squad to participate in the 2009 Mediterranean Games. Schneiderlin featured in three of the four matches contested as France finished in fifth place.

The following year, he appeared with the under-20 team at the 2010 Toulon Tournament. In the opening game of the tournament against Colombia U20, Schneiderlin scored the first goal in the 34th minute, helping his side win the game 2–0.

In July 2010, he was part of France's team that attempted to qualify for the 2011 UEFA European Under-21 Championship. He played against Malta U21s in a 2–0 victory under coach Erick Mombaerts.

=== Senior ===
In November 2013, various British media outlets reported that Schneiderlin was eligible to represent England. Under Article 8.1, Regulations Governing The Application of the Statutes, FIFA Statutes, Schneiderlin is only eligible to represent France at international level as he has played at various age-levels in UEFA competitions prior to gaining British citizenship.

On 13 May 2014, France coach Didier Deschamps named Schneiderlin on the team's standby list for the 2014 FIFA World Cup in Brazil. He was later called into the full squad following the withdrawal of the injured Clément Grenier. On 8 June Schneiderlin made his international debut, replacing Karim Benzema for the final three minutes of an 8–0 friendly win against Jamaica in Lille.

His debut in the World Cup came 17 days later, when he played the full 90 minutes of a 0–0 draw with Ecuador at the Maracanã Stadium in Rio de Janeiro; Deschamps made six changes for this final group match due to France's previous good form. That was his only appearance at the tournament, in which France lost in the quarter-finals to Germany.

Schneiderlin was not initially selected to France's squad for their hosting of UEFA Euro 2016, with Leicester City's N'Golo Kanté chosen at his expense, but he was added following an injury to Lassana Diarra. Schneiderlin did not play in any of France's seven matches at the tournament, in which they lost in the final to Portugal.

== Personal life ==
In March 2016, Schneiderlin became engaged to Camille Sold, whom he married in June 2017. Their son was born in October 2018.

== Career statistics ==
=== Club ===
Appearances and goals by club, season and competition
| Club | Season | League | | | National cup (Note: Includes FA Cup, Coupe de France) | | League cup (Note: Includes Football League/EFL Cup) | | Continental | | Other | | Total | |
| Club | Season | Division | Apps | Goals | Apps | Goals | Apps | Goals | Apps | Goals | Apps | Goals | Apps | Goals |
|---|---|---|---|---|---|---|---|---|---|---|---|---|---|---|
| Strasbourg B | 2005–06 | CFA | 2 | 0 | — | | — | | — | | — | | 2 | 0 |
| Strasbourg B | 2006–07 | CFA | 22 | 3 | — | | — | | — | | — | | 22 | 3 |
| Strasbourg B | 2007–08 | CFA | 13 | 2 | — | | — | | — | | — | | 13 | 2 |
| Strasbourg B | Total | | 37 | 5 | — | | — | | — | | — | | 37 | 5 |
| Strasbourg | 2006–07 | Ligue 2 | 2 | 0 | 0 | 0 | 0 | 0 | — | | — | | 2 | 0 |
| Strasbourg | 2007–08 | Ligue 1 | 3 | 0 | 0 | 0 | 0 | 0 | — | | — | | 3 | 0 |
| Strasbourg | Total | | 5 | 0 | 0 | 0 | 0 | 0 | — | | — | | 5 | 0 |
| Southampton | 2008–09 | Championship | 30 | 0 | 1 | 0 | 2 | 0 | — | | — | | 33 | 0 |
| Southampton | 2009–10 | League One | 37 | 1 | 4 | 0 | 2 | 0 | — | | 4 (Note: Appearance(s) in Football League Trophy) | 0 | 47 | 1 |
| Southampton | 2010–11 | League One | 27 | 0 | 2 | 0 | 1 | 0 | — | | 1 | 0 | 31 | 0 |
| Southampton | 2011–12 | Championship | 42 | 2 | 1 | 0 | 4 | 0 | — | | — | | 47 | 2 |
| Southampton | 2012–13 | Premier League | 36 | 5 | 1 | 0 | 0 | 0 | — | | — | | 37 | 5 |
| Southampton | 2013–14 | Premier League | 33 | 2 | 3 | 0 | 0 | 0 | — | | — | | 36 | 2 |
| Southampton | 2014–15 | Premier League | 26 | 4 | 1 | 1 | 3 | 0 | — | | — | | 30 | 5 |
| Southampton | Total | | 231 | 14 | 13 | 1 | 12 | 0 | — | | 5 | 0 | 261 | 15 |
| Manchester United | 2015–16 | Premier League | 29 | 1 | 3 | 0 | 0 | 0 | 7 (Note: Four appearances in UEFA Champions League, three appearances in UEFA Europa League) | 0 | — | | 39 | 1 |
| Manchester United | 2016–17 | Premier League | 3 | 0 | 0 | 0 | 2 | 0 | 2 (Note: Appearances in UEFA Europa League) | 0 | 1 (Note: Appearance in FA Community Shield) | 0 | 8 | 0 |
| Manchester United | Total | | 32 | 1 | 3 | 0 | 2 | 0 | 9 | 0 | 1 | 0 | 47 | 1 |
| Everton | 2016–17 | Premier League | 14 | 1 | — | | — | | — | | — | | 14 | 1 |
| Everton | 2017–18 | Premier League | 30 | 0 | 1 | 0 | 0 | 0 | 9 | 0 | — | | 40 | 0 |
| Everton | 2018–19 | Premier League | 14 | 0 | 0 | 0 | 2 | 0 | — | | — | | 16 | 0 |
| Everton | 2019–20 | Premier League | 15 | 0 | 1 | 0 | 2 | 0 | — | | — | | 18 | 0 |
| Everton | Total | | 73 | 1 | 2 | 0 | 4 | 0 | 9 | 0 | — | | 88 | 1 |
| Nice | 2020–21 | Ligue 1 | 28 | 0 | 2 | 0 | — | | 5 | 0 | — | | 35 | 0 |
| Nice | 2021–22 | Ligue 1 | 20 | 0 | 4 | 0 | — | | — | | — | | 24 | 0 |
| Nice | Total | | 48 | 0 | 6 | 0 | — | | 5 | 0 | — | | 59 | 0 |
| Western Sydney; Wanderers (loan) | 2022–23 | A-League Men | 12 | 2 | — | | — | | — | | — | | 12 | 2 |
| A.E. Kifisia | 2023–24 | Super League Greece | 9 | 1 | 0 | 0 | — | | — | | — | | 9 | 1 |
| Career total | | | 447 | 24 | 24 | 1 | 18 | 0 | 23 | 0 | 6 | 0 | 518 | 25 |

=== International ===
Appearances and goals by national team and year
| National team | Year | Apps | Goals |
|---|---|---|---|
| France | 2014 | 7 | 0 |
| France | 2015 | 8 | 0 |
| Total | | 15 | 0 |

== Honours ==
Manchester United

- FA Cup: 2015–16
- FA Community Shield: 2016
- UEFA Europa League: 2016–17

Nice

- Coupe de France runner-up: 2021–22

France

- UEFA European Championship runner-up: 2016

Individual

- Southampton Player of the Season: 2012–13
