= Ken Morton =

English footballer

Personal information
- Date of birth: 19 May 1947 (age 79)
- Place of birth: Copley, Greater Manchester, England
- Position: Left winger

Youth career
- Manchester United

Senior career*
| Years | Team | Apps | (Gls) |
| 1964–1965 | Manchester United | 0 | (0) |
| 1965–1966 | York City | 10 | (2) |
| 1966–1967 | Blackpool | 0 | (0) |
| 1967–1968 | Fleetwood | ? | (?) |
| 1968–1969 | Darlington | 4 | (0) |
| 1969–1970 | Stockton | ? | (?) |
| 1981 | Wollongong City | 8 | (1) |
| Total | | 22 | (3) |

Managerial career
- 1981–1982: Wollongong City
- 2008–: South Hobart
- * Club domestic league appearances and goals

Ken Morton (born 19 May 1947) is an English former professional footballer and coach who is the manager of National Premier Leagues club South Hobart. He played primarily as a winger, making a total of 14 appearances in the English Football League.

== Career ==
=== Playing career ===
Born in Copley, Morton began his career with Manchester United, but left without making a senior appearance, and later played for a number of teams in both the Football League and Non-League football, including York City, Blackpool, Fleetwood, Darlington and Stockton.

=== Coaching career ===
After retiring as a player, Morton later became active as a coach in Australia, Malaysia, the Maldives, Vietnam and Ethiopia. He was the inaugural coach of Wollongong City. He managed the team to 11th place that season and left the club after 22 rounds the following season, with captain Chris Dunleavy taking over caretaker duties.

Morton is part of the Tasmanian A-League Bid. He was hired as head coach of South Hobart in 2008.
