= South Coast A-League Bid =

Potential expansion of Australian soccer

- Proposed name: Wollongong Wolves FC
- Status: Ongoing

Location
- Region: Illawarra, South Coast

Sport information
- Sport: Soccer
- League: A-League Men; A-League Women

History
- First proposed: 2005

A-League expansion in the South Coast and Illawarra regions of New South Wales has been proposed since the establishment of the A-League in 2005. Before the introduction of the league, Football Federation Australia (FFA) chairman Frank Lowy speculated that he hoped to expand the competition into cities such as Wollongong, among others. Supporting a South Coast bid for admission into the A-League is its strong junior participation rates in football, with the area widely regarded as a regional heartland of football.

A bid known as 'South Coast Football' was entered to join the 2009–10 A-League season but lost out to Gold Coast United and North Queensland Fury. A second attempt was made by the group to join for the 2010–11 season, however lost out to Melbourne Heart and the unsuccessful-Sydney Rovers. In 2011, FFA announced that future expansion would not be considered for the foreseeable future in preference to consolidating and strengthening the existing clubs. Since that time, expansion into the South Coast region has gained momentum with FFA expressing interest to increase the size of the league from 2017.

== South Coast Football bid ==
In 2008, a community-based group known as 'South Coast Football' put in a bid to join the A-League. The bid had its genesis in a decision by Wollongong City Council to pursue an A-League place in 2006. South Coast Football was led by local businessman Eddy De Gabriele and aimed to represent a population of 320,000 in the South Coast region, taking in the Wollongong, Shellharbour, Shoalhaven, Wollondilly, Wingecarribee, Kiama and Eurobodalla local government areas.

Former Wollongong City player Scott Chipperfield threw his support behind the bid and Tim Cahill also declared his support for the bid after launch his first coaching academy in Wollongong. As part of the bid Bruce Gordon, Australia's 14th wealthiest person, was approached to potentially help bankroll the club. In late 2008, South Coast Football launched a membership drive to demonstrate the level of commitment to A-League football in the community. More than 6,000 fans turned up to the club's touted home ground of WIN Stadium, Wollongong to watch a 2008 A-League Pre-Season Challenge Cup match between Sydney FC and Wellington Phoenix.

The South Coast Football bid to enter the league in 2009 ultimately lost out to Gold Coast United and North Queensland Fury. The A-League was expected to expand further into a 12 or 14 team competition in 2010 and the South Coast Football bid was considered a front runner to join the expansion, but lost out to Melbourne Heart and the unsuccessful-Sydney Rovers. In 2011, FFA announced that it is going to consolidate and strengthen the current clubs and cease expansion for the foreseeable future.

== Wollongong Wolves bid ==
The twice National Soccer League champions South Coast Wolves has been proposed as possible entry to the A-League. However, during the initial expansion efforts the club announced no plans of reaching the national stage and were in full support of a new club for the region.

In July 2015, as part of South Coast Wolves's 35th anniversary celebrations, it was announced that along with a brand new club logo, the name of the club would also change from South Coast Wolves back to their former name of Wollongong Wolves. The changes were to be brought in for the 2016 season onwards. Along with its re-branding, the club also announced its ambitions to join the A-League in next expansion period.

Wollongong's bid for an official A-League expansion license for the 2019-20 season was formally rejected by Football Federation Australia in October 2018.

== See also ==
- Expansion of the A-League Men
