= Tasmanian A-League bid =

- Proposed name: Tasmania United FC
- Status: Ongoing

Location
- Region: Tasmania
- Proposed stadium: Macquarie Point Stadium, Hobart; York Park, Launceston; Bellerive Oval, Hobart; North Hobart Oval, Hobart

Sport information
- Sport: Soccer
- League: A-League Men; A-League Women

History
- First proposed: 2005

A-League expansion in Tasmania is proposed since the establishment of the A-League in 2005. Before the introduction of the league, Football Federation Australia (FFA) chairman Frank Lowy said he hoped to expand the competition into cities such as Hobart and Launceston, among others.

Football Tasmania president Bob Gordon stated in 2021 that he was confident a club would likely be entering the competition as soon as 2023. However in 2023 the proposal was pushed back to the 2025-2026 season, on the condition that either the Macquarie Point Stadium is made convertible or a new rectangular stadium is built.

The bid has the backing of the Tasmanian government.

== Tasmania United bid ==
=== History ===
Following the success of the A-League, a Tasmanian football task force headed by Hobart-based businessman John McGirr was given the task of finding funding for a Tasmanian-based A-League side. The taskforce has registered the name "Tasmania United FC" and is submitting a bid for the 2011–12 season. In September 2008 McGirr Announced the adoption of an official club logo for the proposed club and announced that the taskforce was on target "to present an extremely strong business case to both FFA and the Tasmanian community and intend to be ready to put a formal proposal for an A-League licence by mid-2009". Tasmanian Football Taskforce official Ken Morton has stated that should Tasmania United FC be awarded an A-League licence then the competition would become "a far more 'national' competition than rivals AFL and NRL, which are based in Melbourne and Sydney respectively. Indeed, the AFL has consistently refused Tasmania's push to have its own team, with economic factors being brought into play. We have a good cricket team down there who compete well at national level and we believe we can do the same in the A-League." In February 2008, Ken Morton stated "we meet the criteria but we require an owner."

In October 2007, Football Federation Tasmania CEO Martin Shaw suggested that Tasmania would be a viable location for an A-League club, mentioning the fact that it would need support from state and local government. It has been suggested that such a team would play games in both Hobart and Launceston. In 2008, a Tasmanian football taskforce was formed to investigate an A-League bid. The taskforce registered the name "Tasmania United FC" and submitted a bid for the join the 2011–12 A-League season. Despite multiple failed attempts to join the A-League, Tasmania United remains active in promoting a Tasmanian-based A-League club.

In October 2007, Football Federation Tasmania CEO Martin Shaw suggested that Tasmania would be a viable location for an A-League club. It was further suggested, in something of a contradiction, that a Tasmanian team would require Tasmanian Government support. On 16 March 2009, the Tasmanian Football Taskforce Chairman John McGirr clarified this statement by pointing out that "Obviously as a task force we would welcome any sort of funding from whoever," John McGirr then added "from day one we have seen this as a private business enterprise and we are not looking for any Government funds to prop the bid up".

The Tasmanian task force, which has the backing of the state government, has scheduled the launch of Tasmania United FC for 25 November, and that a deal with a major sponsor is close at hand. Ken Morton states that "we had good news regarding the major investor and once that is finalised in the next few days I think you will see our bid progress very aggressively."

On 12 February 2009, the task force announced it was "still in the mix" and "working harder than ever of late to entice investors and sponsors, as well as being in regular contact with the FFA". The Taskforce was unable to complete a formal proposal in time for the early expansion, although the Taskforce continued operating with the intention of obtaining a future A-league licence. Ken Morton has since stated that he believes Tasmania United FC's chance of entering the A-League to be "100%. I believe the A-League want us, the Tasmanian community want us and for this reason I believe it will become reality." On 16 March 2009, Chairman John McGirr stated that the task force was in negotiation with a Dubai businessman regarding sponsorship and ownership of Tasmania United FC. The businessman has since been named as Sheik Mohammed Hussein Ali Al Amoudi—the 77th richest man in the world with a net worth of $13.7 billion. As of December 2010, it is unknown if Sheik Mohammed Hussein Ali Al Amoudi has any involvement with the consortium.

On 22 April 2009 the Tasmanian Government launched a six-week feasibility study to determine the possibility of a Tasmanian A-League side being viable. Stratcorp Consulting and Sporting Management Concepts, the same business to successfully manage the Melbourne Heart A-League licence bid have been engaged to manage the study utilising their experience in this field. The outcome was a final Report that considered the key issues and questions that decision makers and potential funding partners may have in relation to the need for the proposed A-League team. The Report was aimed at exciting key Ministers and Government staff about the opportunities to establish the team and provide sufficient need and justification to enable Government commitment. This feasibility study succeeded in obtaining State Government and FFA support and shortly after its review the State Government agreed to provide funding towards the preparation of a Business Plan.

With the positive feedback obtained from the completed feasibility study, the taskforce obtained funding from the Tasmanian State Government to cover those costs associated with the preparation of a business plan that could be made available to both investors and the FFA. The business plan was completed successfully in late December 2010, with the consortium stating that it would be making a presentation to both the FFA and key investors in early to mid-2011 with the express intention of winning the now vacant 11th A-league licence for the 2012–2013 Season along with gaining crucial private investment. There is unknown if Sheik Mohammed Hussein Ali Al Amoudi—the 77th richest man in the world, may be one of these potential investors. Early in 2011 the results of the business plan were released to the public by Tasmania United FC and these demonstrated that Tasmania could hold an A-league licence.

Shortly after the business plan was released to the public the current state government made a media release alongside representatives of Football Federation Tasmania, who had no involvement with Tasmania United FC or a Tasmanian bid until that point, and with no members of the Tasmania United FC board present. At the media release the State Government stated that they would not be pursuing any bid and that if they were to do so in the future then they would utilise a business model where Football Federation Tasmania controlled all aspects of the bid and club. A short time afterwards the board of Tasmania United FC who had laid the foundation stated that they would continue to press for a future Tasmanian A-League licence that worked with the State Government and Football Federation Tasmania, though as a wholly independent body.

=== Club culture ===
It has been decided that Tasmania United FC will be a club with a nickname that represents all Tasmanians. Many oppose using the name 'Tigers' as the state cricket team already has this nickname. For similar reasons the name 'Tassie Devils' may also be excluded as the former Tasmanian VFL side used this name and there is the expectation that it will be the name of a future Tasmanian-based AFL side.

The Taskforce has obtained supporter opinion of the names Wolves, Apples, Lions, Convicts, Pirates and Islanders and several others through the use of website polling. Another suggestion was The Wanderers due to the famous overland walking track, however this title is now taken. No firm decisions have been made although Wolves remains a highly popular choice making use of the thylacines name 'native marsupial wolf', although that name in football is already associated with the Wollongong Wolves, another team who may eventually enter the A-League.

=== Potential home ground ===
Despite a growing national interest supporters of a Tasmanian A-League club are still divided over the location of home games with both the north and south ends of the state supporting home games being played in their own region. The two supporter groups are focused on either Hobart or Launceston. Both cities contain sporting venues; Bellerive Oval in Hobart and York Park in Launceston, but both are oval designs and would be far from ideal. In spite of these concerns the Tasmanian A-league Taskforce have in consultation with the FFA implemented a policy directed towards delivering one A-League Club for all Tasmanians playing home games in both the north and south of the state. This has resulted in considerable frustration for some football fans in both the north and south of the state who believe that football should be solely located in their region only.

Given that the future establishment of a 20/20 League in Australia may prevent the use of Bellerive stadium for A-League matches, other facilities have been suggested including the redevelopment of King George V Oval, North Hobart Oval, Wentworth Park or Rugby Park, along with the possible complete development of an entirely new sporting precinct somewhere in the Greater Hobart region. These possibilities are all reliant upon potential investment from third parties. Many potential supporters of A-League in Tasmania have encouraged the redevelopment of North Hobart Oval as Tasmania's premier association rules and rugby field in Tasmania.

Other grounds that may be suitable for friendly matches include both the Devonport Oval and West Park in Burnie, as a Tasmanian A-league side will no doubt want a presence on the North West Coast of the state, if only in friendly matches.

=== Squad ===
During the bidding process, although there were no plans to sign players until the granting of an A-League licence, Ken Morton stated that he already had in mind "2 Dutch Under 21 stars who I think would do very well and they would be great acquisitions for the A-League. Both played in Under 21 European Championships for Holland." However, the age related retirement of both players from football makes their acquisition unlikely, though not impossible. While no firm decisions have been made Ken states that he is establishing scouting networks "through existing scouts in Brazil, the UK and Asia." and intends to look at recruiting both locally and from "Asia, Africa and Europe." When asked if he would be prepared to apply for the senior coach position once an A-League licence was granted, Ken Morton stated "Yes, without a doubt."

=== National Youth League squad ===
Following the successful friendly matches played between a Tasmanian Youth Side and National Youth League squads Ken Morton has stated that "given a chance our youngsters can compete at this level" and that "the passion shown by these boys was tremendous." Tasmanian sides have also performed in previous National Championships

== See also ==
- Expansion of the A-League
