= Jefferson Cheng =

Filipino business man and association football administrator

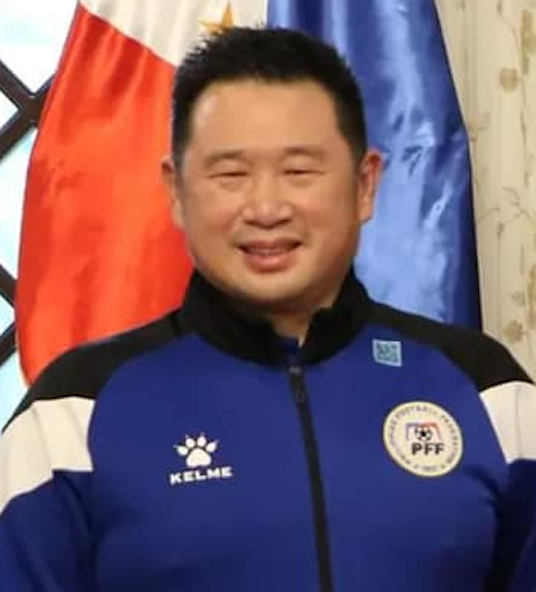
- Cheng in 2022
- Born: 1955 (age 70–71)
- Occupations: Businessman, sports executive
- Known for: General manager (Note: General manager role. The role of the head coach is separate position.) and sports patron of the Philippine women's national football team (2017–2024)

Jefferson Cheng is a Filipino and Australian businessman and football administrator. He is the owner of Philippines Football League club Aguilas and a co-owner of A-League side Western Sydney Wanderers. He was the general manager of the Philippines women's national football team which qualified for their first ever FIFA Women's World Cup in 2023.

== Early life and education ==
Jefferson Cheng was born in 1955. Cheng attended Xavier School where he used to play competitive football as a leftback. He also studied at the University of the Philippines where he graduated with a degree in architecture.

== Career ==
=== Football ===
==== Club ====
Cheng owns Davao Aguilas (now the Aguilas–UMak) of the Philippines Football League. He is also the co-owner of A-League club Western Sydney Wanderers.

==== Philippine women national team ====
Cheng has also been a sponsor of the Philippines women's national football team since 2017. He was appointed the team manager of the team in 2017. He has been also a co-chair of the Philippine Football Federation Women's Committee. As team manager, he oversaw the national team in the 2022 AFC Women's Asian Cup qualifiers, as well as the tournament proper held in India. His connections in Australia, led to the hiring of Alen Stajcic as head coach for Philippines' stint in the Asian Cup. Under Stajcic and Cheng, the Philippines ended its campaign as semifinalists and qualified for the 2023 FIFA Women's World Cup – their first ever World Cup.

In January 2024, it was announced that Cheng was retained as team manager, following John Gutierrez's election as PFF president in November 2023. However in June 2024, Cheng stepped down from the role citing the situation is "not workable" due to "incompatible" and "misalignment" of goals with the current organization. Freddy Gonzales succeeded as interim manager.

==== Philippine youth national teams ====
Cheng has also been a sponsor of the Philippine youth national team system; from the under-19 to the under-23 team.

=== Padel ===
Cheng was named president of Padel Pilipinas, the national sports association for padel in the Philippines, in June 2026.

=== Other ventures ===
Cheng serves as the director of Sabre Sports United and president of the Philippine Airport Ground Support Solutions. He has been the director of the International Goalkeeping Academy of Jimmy Fraser.

He also sponsors local youth tournaments in Davao through his company Speed Regalo.

== Personal life ==
Jefferson Cheng has a son named Enzo who has been a member of the Philippines national under-19 and under-22 national teams. The elder Cheng is Filipino-Australian having emigrated to Australia in 1994.
