= David Slade (businessman) =

Australian soccer administrator

David Slade is the Australian Director of British multinational retailer Topshop and co-owner of A-League club Western Sydney Wanderers.
