= Philippine Padel Association =

- Padel Pilipinas
- Sport: Padel
- Jurisdiction: Philippines
- Abbreviation: PPA
- Founded: 2020
- Affiliation: IPF
- Affiliation date: 2023
- President: Jeff Cheng

Official website
- padel.ph
- (Philippines)

The Philippine Padel Association (PPA) also known as Padel Pilipinas is the governing body for the sport of padel in the Philippines.

== History ==
Senator Pia Cayetano founded the Philippine Padel Association in 2020 and became its inaugural president. It became a member of the International Padel Federation in 2023.

By January 2024, the Philippine Olympic Committee has recognized Padel Pilipinas as the national sports association of the padel for the Philippines. It was also recognized by the Philippine Sports Commission of the government.

The national padel teams of the Philippines was launched in September 2024.

In June 2025, Jeff Cheng was made president of Padel Pilipinas succeeding Vince Dizon.
