= Lyall Gorman =

Lyall Norman Gorman is the Group CEO of the Manly Sea Eagles. Formally the group CEO of the Cronulla Sutherland Sharks. His appointment to the Sharks on 25 November 2014 follows a tumultuous period for the Sharks after two years of ASADA investigations and the 2014 Wooden Spoon.

Gorman is the former Executive Chairman of A-League club Western Sydney Wanderers FC, appointed in the position on 17 May 2012. He was previously the head of the A-League competition itself, as well as the Chairman of Central Coast Mariners FC.

== Personal life ==
Gorman has two children Liam and Loren. He grew up in the Illawarra region of New South Wales (NSW) Australia.
