= Western Sydney Wanderers FC =

Australian professional association football club

Western Sydney Wanderers
- Full name: Western Sydney Wanderers Football Club
- Nicknames: Wanderers, Red & Black, Western Sydney
- Short name: WSW
- Founded: 4 April 2012; 14 years ago
- Ground: CommBank Stadium
- Capacity: 30,000
- Owner(s): Paul Lederer, Jefferson Cheng, Glenn Duncan, David Slade
- Chairman: Jefferson Cheng
- Head coach: Ufuk Talay
- League: A-League Men
- 2025–26: 12th of 12
- Website: wswanderersfc.com.au
Home colours	Away colours

Western Sydney Wanderers Football Club (colloquially known as Western Sydney, Wanderers, or simply as WSW) is an Australian professional soccer club based in the Western Sydney region of Sydney, New South Wales. It competes in the country's premier competition, the A-League, under licence from the Australian Professional Leagues (APL). formerly under licence by the Football Federation Australia (FFA).

Formed in April 2012 by FFA, Wanderers was established with a strong community focus. A series of community forums across Western Sydney helped choose the club's name and colours, as well as its culture and playing style. The club's record-breaking inaugural season won them an A-League premiership and saw the club reach the 2013 A-League Grand Final. The club followed that up by contesting the 2014 A-League Grand Final and securing second place in their second season of the league. The club was also crowned Asian champions in their Champions League debut season.

The club is run from a facility based in Blacktown, and currently plays matches at Western Sydney Stadium. Their foundation home ground of Parramatta Stadium was closed & demolished in 2017 as part of process for building the new stadium. An academy youth team competes in the National Youth League and the National Premier Leagues NSW. A women's team competes in the A-League Women. The youth and women's matches are played at various locations across Western Sydney, including Marconi Stadium, Campbelltown Stadium and Cook Park. The club also has a Powerchair Football team which competes in the NSW Western Division Powerchair Football League, with matches played at Football NSW Headquarters.

== History ==
=== Origins ===
Western Sydney continues to be an important region for FFA. It is the heartland of football in NSW, it is one of the most popular football regions in the country, and we've always said we've wanted to have an A-League team to represent the Western Sydney region.

— FFA CEO Ben Buckley on the prospect of a club, September 2009.

The Western Sydney region was regarded as a potential location for one of the founding A-League clubs in 2005, originally intended to be the base for Sydney FC. When Sydney FC put forward their bid to participate in the inaugural A-League season, Football NSW (which backed the bid) desired for the club's home ground to be Parramatta Stadium in Western Sydney. Though after winning the A-League licence, Football Federation Australia (FFA) Chairman Frank Lowy forced a number of changes to the bid. The main of these were in moving the club to Sydney Football Stadium in the Eastern Suburbs of Sydney and simultaneously reducing Football NSW's involvement from 100 to 25 percent. Frank Lowy's son, David Lowy, was also installed as a major investor. In response, Football NSW made the decision to pull out its involvement with Sydney FC amid claims the A-League club had become a "plaything" for Frank Lowy and his family. Football NSW stated its dislike of Lowy's autocratic style in establishing the club and the perceived lack of consultation on key club issues. An unsuccessful bid named "Sydney Blues", which had proposed to play at the Sydney Football Stadium was the only other Sydney-based bid. Sydney FC entered the A-League with a five-year city exclusivity deal as part of the league's "one-city, one-team" policy, preventing the establishment of another Sydney-based club until the deal expired.

By 2008, as the five-year deal wound to its conclusion, FFA announced its intention to expand the A-League, with a second Sydney-based club a favourable option. FFA received 10 expressions of interest, two of which from potential Western Sydney based teams. Despite the unsuccessful attempt to establish a Western Sydney-based team in the form of Sydney Rovers (due to financial and technical reasons), FFA were still strongly committed in pursuing a club in the region.

=== Foundations ===
The catalyst for the formation of the Western Sydney Wanderers was FFA revoking Gold Coast United's A-League licence on 29 February 2012. After a series of running battles between FFA and Clive Palmer – owner of Gold Coast United, over topics such as crowd control, stadium attendance capacities and breaches of A-League regulations. The loss of Gold Coast United brought the league down to nine clubs, one fewer than what FFA needed for their upcoming television rights negotiations.

On 4 April 2012, then FFA CEO Ben Buckley announced the creation of "New Sydney Club" based in the city's west to play in the A-League. The new club would be set up to compete in the 2012–13 season, though despite several attempts by FFA to find a backer to own and run the club no individual owner or consortium of owners decided to take on the new Sydney club. With the October deadline approaching, FFA decided to push through the club by taking on the ownership role themselves. This was helped by securing $4 million from the Australian Government in a grant for the creation and ongoing costs of the club.

As notable Australian soccer players Scott Chipperfield, Tim Cahill, Adpol and Lucas Neill expressed their support for the Western Sydney-based club, so did the local soccer community, with FFA holding supporter forums in Mount Pritchard, Parramatta, Rooty Hill, Penrith, Castle Hill, Campbelltown and Bankstown, where community members discussed such topics as the club's values and culture, playing style, home ground, and proposed names and colours. Following the community forums, FFA launched an online survey to decide on various options for the new club. It covered similar aspects of culture, location, team colour and playing style. A final survey was later launched with a specific focus on the club's colours and name. Options for team colours were black and red, black and white, and red, white and black. Options for the team name were Athletic, Wanderers, Wolves, Strikers and Rangers.

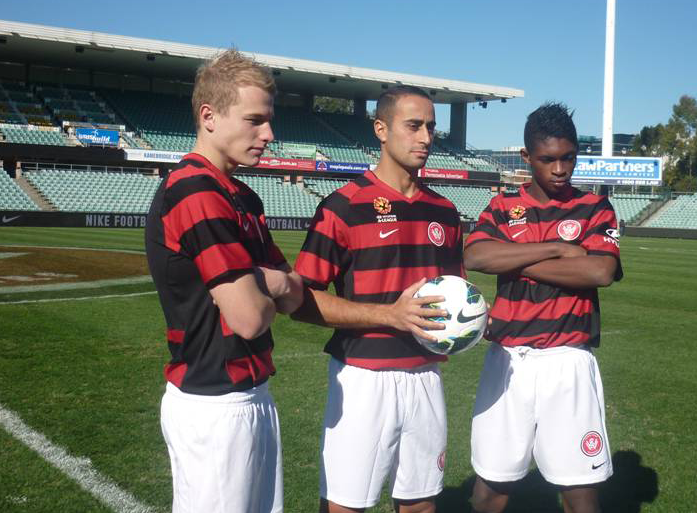
The first three signed players (Mooy, Elrich and Appiah) at the club's launch

On 17 May 2012, former A-League head Lyall Gorman was appointed chairman of the as yet unnamed club. Tony Popovic was also announced as the inaugural head coach of the Western Sydney team. Popovic joined the club after requesting to be released from the final year of his contracted role as assistant coach of Crystal Palace, after ending talks with both A-League Sydney clubs and stating his desire to build a club from scratch as an opportunity he could not pass up. Popovic signed with the Western Sydney team to take the helm for four seasons. On 22 May 2012, Popovic's close friend Ante Milicic also joined the club as assistant coach.

On 25 June 2012, the official club name, logo and colours were formally announced. The name "Western Sydney Wanderers FC" was officially released, as was the club logo, the home playing strip, the home ground (Parramatta Stadium) and the first three signed players: Aaron Mooy, Tarek Elrich and Kwabena Appiah. The name 'Wanderers' had been an overwhelming favourite among fans and community groups, with it also paying homage to Wanderers F.C., the first registered soccer club in Australia, who played in the area in 1880.

=== Tony Popovic era ===
==== Inaugural season, 2012–13 ====
With the start of Western Sydney Wanderers' first season approaching, Tony Popovic was charged with putting together a competitive squad for the 2012–13 A-League, which would be the team's only competition of the season. The squad was made up of relative unknowns, though included former Japan international and Asian Footballer of the Year Shinji Ono, as well as Jérome Polenz, Mateo Poljak, Youssouf Hersi, Iacopo La Rocca and Dino Kresinger. On 6 October 2012, Western Sydney Wanderers played their first competitive match of any kind against reigning A-League Premiers Central Coast Mariners in the first round of the league. The match ended in a 0–0 draw. It took the team a further three weeks, until the fourth round of the league to win their first competitive match of any kind; after two consecutive losses, one of which the first Sydney Derby, the encounter against reigning A-League Champions Brisbane Roar ended 0–1 in favour of Wanderers, with Mark Bridge netting the club's first competitive goal after the team failed to score in their opening three games.

A slow start into the team's first season soon turned positive as Western Sydney Wanderers quickly emerged as one of the leading soccer clubs in Australia. A historic record-breaking season in the league saw the club break an all-time Australian national league record and win their first A-League Premiership after topping the A-League table through a record-undefeated streak, which included 10 straight wins. This feat gained the club direct qualification into the 2014 AFC Champions League, as well as a place in the A-League finals series. A 2–0 win against Brisbane Roar in the semi-finals of the finals series lead the club to the 2013 A-League Grand Final, which on 21 April 2013, Wanderers eventually lost 0–2 to Central Coast Mariners at a sold out Sydney Football Stadium. The success of the club's first season was pitted on first-time coach Popovic who had built the team from its foundations in the space of only five months. Popovic was awarded A-League Coach of the Year and goalkeeper Ante Covic Goalkeeper of the Year. The club's inaugural success, both on and off the field, sparked much interest worldwide, though most notably within Australia, where soccer has often struggled to gain mainstream interest.

==== 2013–14 season ====
The club's second season saw Brendon Santalab and Australian international Matthew Špiranović join the team. Wanderers held second position behind Brisbane Roar throughout the majority of the season despite criticism over the team's squad rotation policy which Popovic implemented with consideration to the AFC Champions League and the short turnaround between matches. On 26 February 2014, the club made their Champions League debut against Ulsan Hyundai. A goal within the first minute of the match by Santalab was cancelled out as the South Korean side scored three unanswered goals to win the match. Nevertheless, the team eventually finished top in their group to progress to the Round of 16. After finishing runners-up in the 2013–14 A-League season, Wanderers secured direct qualification into the 2015 AFC Champions League, as well as a place in the A-League finals series. A 2–0 win against Central Coast Mariners in the semi-finals of the finals series on 26 April 2014, saw the team progress to their second A-League Grand Final in as many seasons. On 4 May 2014, Western Sydney Wanderers competed against Brisbane Roar in the 2014 A-League Grand Final at a sold out Lang Park. 10,000 Wanderers supporters travelled north for the occasion, but after taking the lead through a header from Špiranović the team failed to hold the lead late in the game, later letting slip the A-League Championship during extra time. Following the loss, the team was forced a quick turnaround for their home and final leg of the Champions League Round of 16 – a home and away series against Japanese side Sanfrecce Hiroshima. Despite being down 3–1 on aggregate, the team managed to overturn the result and win 2–0 to progress to the quarter-finals in what was Ono's, Hersi's, Polenz's and inaugural captain Michael Beauchamp's final match for the club.

Shortly after the conclusion of the 2013-14 A-League season the FFA completed their goal of selling the club to a new long term owner. Paying a reported $10 million AUD purchase fee was a consortium headed by smallgoods merchant Paul Lederer along with aircraft ground handling business owner Jefferson Cheng, the Pirtek industrial hose company owner Glenn Duncan and Topshop's Australian director David Slade. The group appointed Lederer as the Chairman of the club and he was the public face of the ownership group until Cheng took over the role in 2024.

We were called a small club yesterday. Today we are the biggest in Asia.

— Tony Popovic on winning the 2014 AFC Champions League, November 2014.

2014 AFC Champions League final second leg starting lineup

==== 2014–15 season ====
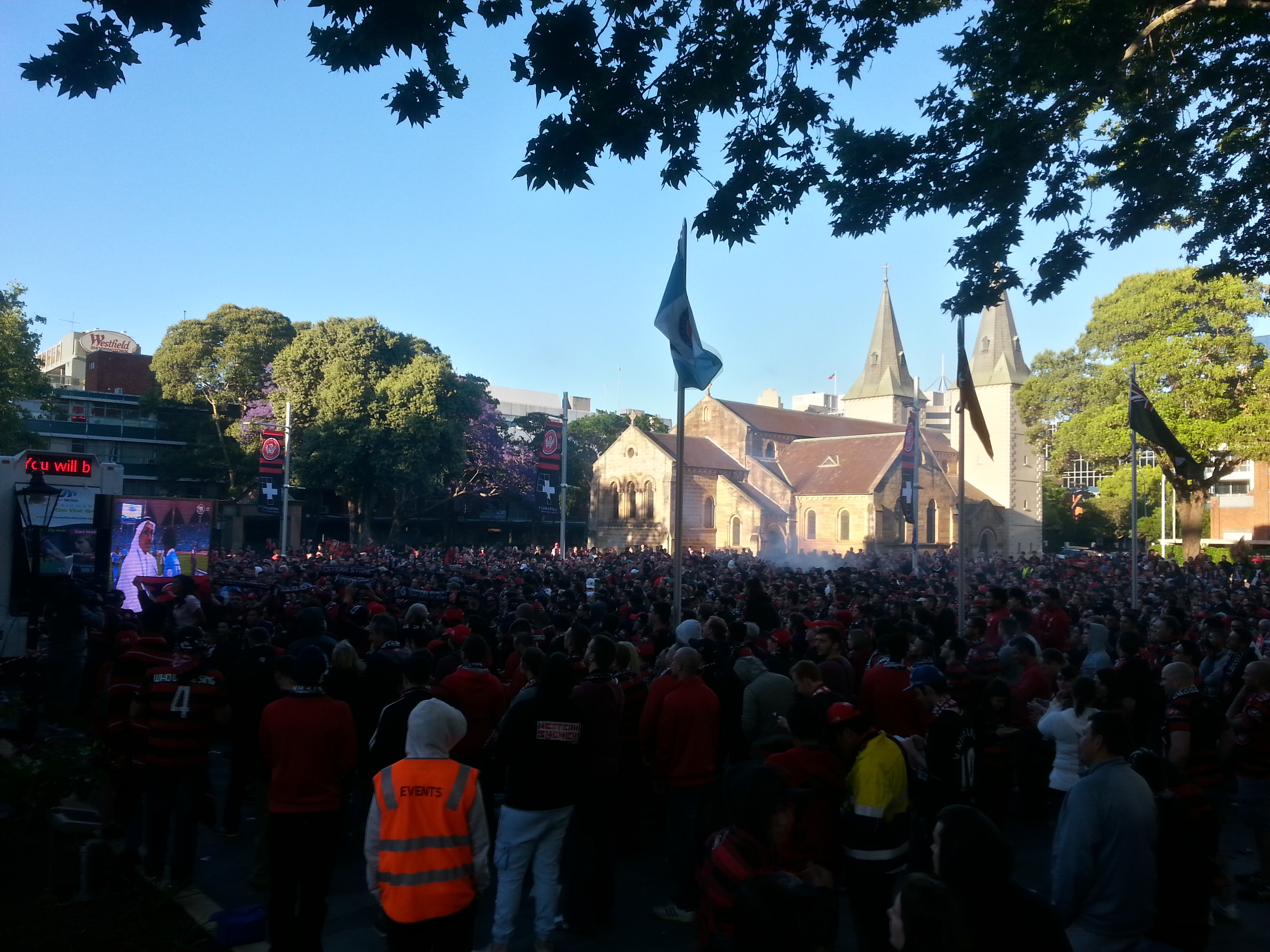
Western Sydney Wanderers supporters celebrating win in Asian Champions League

Prior to the 2014–15 season, the club signed Brazilian midfielder Vítor Saba, as well as Seyi Adeleke, Dutch international Romeo Castelen and Australian international Nikita Rukavytsya. On 12 August 2014, Western Sydney Wanderers competed against Adelaide City in the first round of the inaugural season of the FFA Cup. The match ended 1–0 in favour to Adelaide City, with Wanderers becoming the first professional club to lose to a semi-professional side in the competition.

===== Asian Champions League title =====
The Cup loss was directly followed by Wanderers' continued campaign in the 2014 AFC Champions League; as due to the calendar format of the Asian tournament, the quarter-finals – a home and away series against Guangzhou Evergrande, resumed after a three-month break. The first match was won by Wanderers 1–0, and a 2–1 loss in the second leg was enough to see the club progress to the semi-finals, due to the away goals rule. The first leg of the semi-final clash against FC Seoul ended in a 0–0 draw. In the return leg, Wanderers defeated FC Seoul 2–0, courtesy to goals from Mateo Poljak and Shannon Cole, which advanced the club to the 2014 AFC Champions League Final. In the first leg of the Champions League final, Wanderers defeated Al-Hilal 1–0 at home, and on 1 November 2014, Western Sydney Wanderers won the AFC Champions League after managing a goalless draw in the second leg of the final against Al-Hilal, winning 1–0 on aggregate courtesy of Tomi Juric's goal. They became the first Australian team to be crowned Asian champions, an achievement they reached in only their first attempt in the Asian tournament. There were some controversial decisions from the Japanese referee Yuichi Nishimura, where Al-Hilal felt they deserved two clear penalties. Prior to the final match, Wanderers were criticised by the opposition coach in the media; after being crowned Asian champions, Tony Popovic responded by saying, "We were called a small club yesterday – today we are the biggest in Asia". At the 2014 AFC Annual Awards, Western Sydney Wanderers was named Asian Club of the Year, and Tony Popovic Asian Coach of the Year.

The club's Asian success however, was not replicated in the beginning of the A-League season, with the team managing only three draws out of the first nine matches. The team's poor domestic run was put on hold while the team travelled to Morocco for the 2014 FIFA Club World Cup, where Wanderers faced Mexican side Cruz Azul in a quarter-finals clash on 13 December 2014. After going down to 9-men, Wanderers failed to hold onto the lead late into the match; an unfavourable 3–1 scoreline in extra-time saw Wanderers matched-up against ES Sétif of Algeria in a fifth place play-off. A 2–2 draw led to a penalty shoot-out which finished 5–4 in favour of the African champions, ending Wanderers' run in the tournament with the team finishing in sixth place. After returning home, the team finished the year with a loss in Wellington, in what was the team's 44th match in all competitions for the calendar year – a record for an Australian club. A short mid-season break gave Popovic the chance to organise the squad for the remainder of the season. This included the addition of Japanese internationals Yūsuke Tanaka and Yojiro Takahagi, as well as Australian-born Kerem Bulut among others as either injury replacements or squad replacements for Vítor Saba, Seyi Adeleke and foundation player Kwabena Appiah. As the season resumed, it became apparent that a heavy schedule would be the team's downfall. Wanderers had to manage entering into the 2015 AFC Champions League group-stage with the former season's rivals Guangzhou Evergrande and FC Seoul as well as rescheduled mid-week league fixtures. After a grueling three months the club ended their third season in the league in ninth position, whilst their Champions League season also ended unfavourably with the title-holders eliminated from the group stage, finishing third in their group.

==== 2015–16 season ====
The beginning of the 2015–16 season saw Popovic extended his initial contract with the club for a further three seasons. The effects from the 2014–15 season were felt by the players as Popovic released almost half the squad. In their place Popovic signed 3 Spanish foreign players and Italian striker Federico Piovaccari as a marquee. In the FFA Cup the Wanderers progressed with wins against Brisbane Roar & Palm Beach, then were beaten in a penalty shootout against Perth Glory in the quarter final.

After a slow start to the 2015–16 A-League season, with only 1 point after three matches, Wanderers found their winning ways with a seven-game winning streak to see the team top the league table. The club was unable to stay on top of the league however, and after mixed results in the final half of the season they finished 2nd below Adelaide United, who the Wanderers had failed to beat in the last few weeks of the season.

In their final series semi-final match, Wanderers hosted Brisbane Roar at Parramatta Stadium in the last game before the stadium was demolished. In front of a sold-out crowd of 20,084 Brisbane started the game strongly by racing to a 3–0 lead inside 23 minutes but the Wanderers responded with two goals to make it 3–2 at half time. Romeo Castelen scored an equaliser then put the Wanderers 4–3 in front, only for Brisbane to score again to take the game to extra time. In the 102nd-minute substitute Dario Vidosic scored the decisive goal to send Wanderers to a third Grand Final in four years. In the 2016 A-League Grand Final Adelaide United defeat Wanderers 3–1 in front of a crowd of 50,119. 15 players left the club at the end of the season.

==== 2016–17 season ====
The 2016–17 A-League season began when Western Sydney Wanderers played home to Sydney FC at ANZ Stadium, with Sydney FC winning 4–0. After three years without a derby win, on 18 February, Western Sydney Wanderers, beat Sydney FC 1–0 at ANZ Stadium, Brendon Santalab scoring off a Mitch Nichols cross in the first-half. Three days after the Sydney Derby they started their Asian Champions League campaign by losing 4–0 to Urawa Reds, and subsequent results saw them fail to qualify from the Group Stage. After defeating Wellington Phoenix 3–1 they confirmed their place in the A-League finals, with Brendon Santalab scoring twice to make him the Wanderers all-time leading goal scorer. The team qualified for the A-League finals to play the 3rd place Brisbane Roar. The game ended 1–1 after extra time and Wanderers lost the penalty shoot-out, ending their domestic season.

=== Josep Gombau era ===
==== 2017–18 season ====
The Wanderers began this season with the FFA Cup. They started by defeating Wellington Phoenix 1–0 with new marquee signing Oriol Riera scoring in the 120th minute of the game. A routine 4–0 defeat of Bentleigh Greens followed in the Round of 16. The quarter final match against Blacktown City FC was an epic encounter. The Wanderers went out to an early 1–0 lead through an Oriol Riera penalty kick. Blacktown hit back in the second half and took the game to extra time, where substitute James Andrew scored to put Blacktown ahead. Riera popped up again in the 111th minute to equalise, and the Wanderers held their nerve in the shootout to win it 4–2.

In a huge shock for the A-League and the Wanderers in particular, on 1 October 2017, foundation coach Tony Popovic quit the club to join Karabükspor in the Turkish Super Lig, taking with him assistant manager Andres Carrasco & goalkeeping coach Zeljko Kalac. The Wanderers installed Hayden Foxe as caretaker manager while they looked to appoint a full-time manager. After defeating Perth Glory in the opening round, they lost the FFA Cup Semi-Final against Adelaide United.

Josep Gombau was announced as the new manager for the Wanderers on 1 November 2017. His first game in charge was a 1–1 home draw against Melbourne City. The team then lost 3 in a row against Adelaide, Brisbane and a 5–0 drubbing against city rivals Sydney FC. Gombau stabilised the team somewhat in the busy January new year period, where he went 4 games without loss between 1 January and 18 January, but the team were unable to string together more than 2 wins in a row. A 3–0 win against Brisbane in the penultimate week of the season put them in the last play-off position, 1 point ahead of Brisbane and Perth, who were facing each other in the final week.

While a win would have secured a finals berth as Brisbane defeated Perth 3–2, the Wanderers season fell apart in the second half. Having taken an early lead with an Oriol Riera goal, the Wanderers conceded two goals to Adelaide before Marcelo Carrusca levelled the game heading into half-time. The 62nd minute sending off of Keanu Baccus for kicking out at an opponent left them a man down and needing to attack. As they pushed players forward Adelaide kept breaking on the counter-attack, eventually scoring the winning goal in the 80th minute through Ryan Kitto.

On 19 April, after a disappointing season where the Wanderers failed to qualify for the 2017–18 A-League finals and players making problems with his management style known to reporters and the public, Gombau was fired. The Wanderers finished the season in 7th place on 33 points, two behind Brisbane, one ahead of Perth, having won 8 games, drew 9, lost 10, scoring 38 goals and conceding 47 against.

=== Markus Babbel era ===
==== 2018–19 season ====
After Gombau was sacked the Wanderers looked to Europe and appointed former German international player Markus Babbel to take over the side, on 19 May 2018. The team stumbled through to the Semi-Final of the FFA Cup with narrow victories over far inferior competition, requiring a 92nd-minute winner from Roly Bonevacia to defeat the amateur Darwin side Hellenic Athletic 4–3, before a 2–1 win against 3rd tier side Bonnyrigg White Eagles FC in the Round of 16. They faced A-League opposition in the Quarter Finals, defeating Melbourne City FC in a scrappy 2–1 game before bowing out of the competition in a comprehensive defeat by rival side Sydney FC in the first FFA Cup Sydney Derby. The A-League season began poorly for the Wanderers, winning just two games in the first half of the season in Rounds 3 and 7. That second win against the Central Coast Mariners was the last win for 10 games, and included losing 6 games in a row in the congested January period.

Babbel made multiple signings in the January transfer window, bringing in Mitchell Duke, Kwame Yeboah and Giancarlo Gallifuoco as an injury replacement for Jordan O'Doherty who suffered an Anterior Cruciate Ligament injury. Performances improved in the second half of the season, winning games against the Mariners, Adelaide & Brisbane Roar as well as a shock 3–0 win against Melbourne City. Ultimately their early season form ensured that the 3–2 Round 24 loss against Newcastle Jets was the final blow in their hopes to play in the A-League finals series. The final Sydney Derby to be played at ANZ Stadium was a 1–1 draw, leaving games against the Central Coast and then Melbourne Victory to end their three-year nomadic existence away from their newly opened Western Sydney Stadium.

==== 2019–20 season ====
The Wanderers began the season, their first at the Western Sydney Stadium in Parramatta, with a stadium opening friendly against English EFL Championship side Leeds United on Saturday 20 July 2019. Leeds won 2–1. The Wanderers played their first A-league match at their new home Bankwest Stadium on 12 October 2019. They defeated the Central Coast Mariners 2–1. They then won their next 2 matches with a 2–1 win against Melbourne Victory and a 1–0 victory over Sydney FC in front of a record crowd of 28,519.

On 16 January, striker Simon Cox joined the club after his departure from English, League One outfit, Southend United, replacing Alexander Meier. On 20 January, Babbel was sacked due to a run of poor performances, and Jean-Paul de Marigny was named as the caretaker.

=== Jean-Paul de Marigny era ===
Having taken over as interim coach from Round 17 of the 2019–20 season, the club played 7 games, winning 3, drawing 3 and losing 1 game. The 1–1 draw with Sydney FC during the final Sydney Derby of the season saw the Wanderers go through a season without losing a game to Sydney FC. When the league was suspended in March as a result of the COVID-19 pandemic in Australia, the results did little to improve the club position on the competition ladder, although they had closed the gap on the position above from 2 points to 1 and improved their goal different deficit. They entered the suspension period in 8th place, four points behind the last finals position.

On 14 July 2020, de Marigny was elevated to the full time position, with his contract to run until the end of the 2020–21 A-League season. The league resumed in July, with the club playing 5 games to finish the season. They drew the first game, won the second, lost two games that effectively ended their chances of making the finals series, including a heavy 5–3 loss against Western United and ended the season with a narrow win against Melbourne Victory. The club ended the season in 9th place with 33 points, coming from 9 wins, 6 draws and 11 losses from 26 games. The Wanderers unexpectedly sacked de Marigny on 12 October 2020, offering a short statement that they had 'parted ways' and were going to appoint a new coach in the coming days.

=== Carl Robinson era ===
Three days after the sacking of de Marigny, the club appointed Carl Robinson on 15 October 2020 as the new head coach. Robinson, a Welsh ex-international was the current head coach of fellow A-League side the Newcastle Jets and had lost only a single game since his arrival at Newcastle earlier in the year. It was reported in the media that Robinson had a release clause in his contract that allowed him to leave the Jets due to the dire financial situation of Newcastle whose owner Martin Lee had not funded the club since October 2019 and was stripped of his license.

==== 2020–21 season ====
The Wanderers began the 2020–21 A-League season by releasing Radosław Majewski, Nicholas Suman, Mathieu Cordier, Nick Sullivan, Tristan Prendergast, Matthew Jurman and Mitchell Duke. Pirmin Schwegler also retired from professional soccer. Several youth players were promoted, including Jarrod Carluccio and 16 year old Allesandro Lopane while German winger Nicolai Muller earned a contract extension. Although Daniel Lopar had left Australia during the COVID lockdown which saw him miss the end of the previous season, he returned to Australia in late October, then left again as the cancellation of the league's TV rights deal caused a collapse in funding, requiring players to agree to new, lower paid contracts or to leave. Robinson bought in a raft of players to replace them, including Bernie Ibini, James Troisi and Jordon Mutch. Duke, a Wanderers talisman, also return to the club 8 games into the season on a short-term loan deal.

Performances during the season were inconsistent but poor overall. With the fixture list impacted by COVID delays & cancellations, there was a brief period when the Wanderers were in first place on the A-League ladder, but they did so having played four games while the other clubs had played less, as low as 1 game in the case of Perth Glory & Melbourne Victory. After their 13th game and on a winning run of 3 games the Wanderers were in 2nd place on 22 points, 3 points behind the surprise package Central Coast Mariners. It was the high point of the season as the side failed to win any of the next 6 games. This included a dismal loss to the last placed Melbourne Victory, who leapt out to a 5–1 lead before three Wanderers goals late in the game, including a long range strike from Muller made the final score 5–4, as Bruce Kamau missed a glorious chance to level the game in the 95th minute. The other teams had begun to catch up the number of games played and the Wanderers position on the ladder sank like a rock, falling to 9th place on 25 points, level with Wellington Phoenix but behind on goal difference. Winning the 2nd Sydney Derby by 3–2 was followed by a 5–0 win against Western United but the inconsistency reared up again, as the next match, an away trip to Perth saw the club lose 5–0, allowing Andy Keogh to go from having a scoreless season to four in a single game. Sydney FC finally overcame their 887-day wait for a Derby win as they completed a comfortable 1–0 win at the Sydney Cricket Ground, with the video review system ruling out a goal for each side. A 2–1 loss at Parramatta to Wellington Phoenix left the Wanderers requiring wins in their final two games and for a large number of other results to go their way.

==== 2021–22 season ====
Robinson was fired after 7 games of the 2021/22 A-League season with the Wanderers in 2nd last place after the side were defeated 3–0 by fellow cellar dwellers Brisbane Roar. The Wanderers had also been embarrassingly eliminated from the 2021 FFA Cup in a 2–1 Round of 16 loss to semi-professional side APIA Leichhardt FC where Robinson's team selection was criticised as a second string team in a competition the club had vowed to take seriously. He left the club on 30 January 2022.

=== Marko Rudan era ===
==== 2021–22 season ====
Marko Rudan was appointed as his replacement, with a contract lasting the remainder of the 2021/22 season. His first game in charge was a 1–0 win against Perth Glory, with Jack Rodwell scoring the winner in the 25th minute. Inconsistent results followed with the side unable to put together two wins in a row and they remained firmly in the bottom half of the table. The highlight of the season was defeating Sydney FC in a comprehensive 2–0 win on 5 March 2022, a day after the club announced they had given Rudan an extended contract through the 2021–22, 2022–23 and 2023–24 seasons. Starting with a 0–0 draw against Adelaide United the team began a 5-game run without a win followed by a win against Newcastle then a 1–0 loss to Wellington Phoenix that made qualification for the finals extremely unlikely and exposed the side to a potential 2022 Australia Cup qualifying play-off against another side in the bottom 4 A-League teams. A player exodus begun in earnest as Keanu Baccus, who was the club's second most capped player and Phillip Cancar signed for clubs in the Scottish Premier League.

==== 2022–23 season ====
Rudan's first full season came to be defined by the relationship with Sydney FC their Sydney Derby rival. Milos Ninkovic, a Sydney FC "talisman" who had made 221 appearances was not able to come to an agreement with Sydney FC and on 3 July 2022 he joined the Wanderers. Former teammate and now media pundit Alex Brosque said the move was a "slap in the face" to both clubs and criticised all those involved in a transfer, saying it should never have happened. Calem Nieuwenhof, a young Sydney FC midfielder also joined the Wanderers as he looked for more playing time. English midfielder Jack Rodwell left to sign a 2-year contract with Sydney FC. The Wanderers won 4 of the first 6 games in outright 2nd place after a 1–0 away win at the new Allianz Stadium.

The derby win was the last match before a month long break for the 2022 FIFA World Cup. In the next 10 games they won just two games including a 1–0 loss in Parramatta to Sydney FC. The A-League's first ever 4–4 draw against Adelaide United saw new loan signing Amor Layouni scoring a stoppage time equaliser on debut to rescue a point. The Wanderers travelled away to Perth once more and lost 1–0 despite dominating the game after a 2nd minute red card to Jordan Elsey. Tomislav Mrcela was sent off with 10 minutes to play and in the 95th minute Aaron McEneff scored a lucky, deflected goal from the edge of the penalty area to send the home crowd into raptures.

Western Sydney smashed in four goals in the 3rd derby of the season. The final match of the round had the Wanderers needing a draw against Melbourne City to secure 3rd place. Brandon Borrello opened the scoring & continued the sterling form since displayed since he replaced Sulejman Krpić at the point of the attack. Marco Tilio hit back after half-time before the first Wanderers goal for Nicolas Milanovic was responded to instantly by Jamie Maclaren. Lawrence Thomas saved a penalty from Andrew Nabbout to keep the game at 2–2. In stoppage time Western Sydney's players threw players forward but lost the ball in front of the Melbourne penalty area and City began a lightning counter-attack that ended with Tilio standing up Mrcela, sending the defender left and right before firing into the bottom corner past Thomas to win the game 3–2. Western Sydney finished on 41 points in 4th place, winning 11 games, drawing 8 and losing 7 with a +16 goal difference.

The loss of 3rd placed proved decisive. Instead of playing the Wellington Phoenix it was first ever A-League finals Sydney Derby. Morgan Schneiderlin scored a 39th-minute penalty but outside that attack & goal the Wanderers were defensive and lacking fight. Sydney FC came out for the second half looking for blood and controlled the game. Mrcela went off hurt in the 61st minute, reminiscent of the Wanderers lost 2014 Grand Final when Topor-Stanley had to leave the game. Adama Traore made a brutal defensive error in the 69th minute. His defensive header back across goal was taken by Robert Mak who took a touch and fired in the equaliser. Rudan was unable to shift the game tactically and it seemed inevitable that Sydney would score again and Adam le Fondre scored, the shortest player on the field rose above the pack at a corner with a flick on 6 yards from goal past Thomas for a 2–1 scoreline. With 5 minutes to play, Wanderers captain Marcelo was found unmarked from a free kick and a player of his quality should have scored but the ball went flying over the bar to groans from the crowd. The last seconds played out with Thomas coming forward for a corner in a desperation attack but Sydney FC held on for a famous win. An exceptionally disappointing result from a season where a semi-final appearance looked like the minimum final result. After the game Ninkovic and Sydney FC coach Steve Corica were involved in a dressing room scuffle with Ninkovic entering the away side dressing room, getting into an argument with his former coach and being escorted out of the room by two Sydney FC staffers.

==== 2023–24 season ====
Marcelo signed a one-year extension to keep him at the Wanderers. Shortly after the finals loss Morgan Schneiderlin announced he would be leaving the Wanderers as the club balked at a reported 1 million AUD salary demand. Jack Clisby returned to his old club and was joined by new signings Dylan Pierias, Lachlan Brook, Joshua Brillante, Doni Grdić, Swedish attacker Marcus Antonsson, Jack Gibson returned from Marconi and junior attacking sensation Marcus Younis was upgraded to a 2-year scholarship contract. Layouni, who had started brightly in his short-term loan spell began talks with both the Wanderers and Melbourne City to join on a transfer but elected instead to return to a European club. Daniel Wilmering left to join the Newcastle Jets. Adama Traore joined Melbourne Victory while Terry Antonis was released a year early and joined Melbourne City. Rhys Williams's severe hamstring rupture forced him into retirement. 17 year old Liam Bonetig moved to Scottish giants Celtic after the defender was scouted at the Wanderers Academy and the Australian School Boys tournament, with the Wanderers receiving FIFA training compensation worth around $360,000. Jarrod Carluccio and Oliver Bozanic were moved on loan to Perth Glory.

The Wanderers started the season well with strong performances in the early rounds of the Australia Cup main stage. The Round of 32 away trip to Perth against Floreat Athena FC resulted in a 6–1 demolition of the NPL WA club, with Lachlan Brook scoring 5 goals, a cup record for a main stage fixture. Adelaide United were up next and they were unable to hold back the striker duo of Marcus Antonsson and Brandon Borrello who scored two goals each with Miloš Ninković scoring his first goal for the Wanderers in a 5–1 rout. The team were knocked out of the Cup in the quarter final after a 4–2 loss away to Brisbane Roar.

Despite leading the competition after 4 rounds the team performances were inconsistent and their position gradually fell down the table. 16 games into the season the team had dropped down to 6th place, with 7 wins, 3 draws and 6 losses with a zero goal difference, with a 1–0 win in the Sydney Derby and a 3–1 win over fellow Sydney side Macarthur FC the highlights. The win against Sydney FC came at a cost, as star striker Borrello was stomped out of the match with a blatant foul from Luke Brattan going unpunished and breaking Borrello's foot, leaving him out for 3 months. Rudan made headlines with a post-match tirade following multiple controversial officiating decisions, including 4 red cards in 3 matches and where Macarthur player Valère Germain scored a hat-trick when he should have been sent off early in the game for violent conduct and his winning goal awarded despite evidence showing it hadn't fully crossed the goal-line. Rudan was suspended three matches.

The second half of the season was a disaster, with a three-game horror run where Sydney FC beat the Wanderers 4–1 in Parramatta, followed that with a 3–1 loss to last placed Western United & an away game against Melbourne City four days later ending in a 7–0 club record defeat where Terry Antonis, who had been frozen out & forced to leave by Rudan scored the goal of the season with a lob over Lawrence Thomas from the half-way line for the final goal. With 4 games to play they were 4 points ahead of Melbourne City for the last finals spot, only to be beaten by Brisbane Roar at home, 2–1 vs Sydney FC away & then surrendered their 6th place by losing to Melbourne City as the teams clashed in the penultimate round. While they kept their chances of finals soccer alive with a frantic final round come from behind twice 4–3 win against Melbourne Victory, it wasn't enough as Melbourne City completed the round and the regular season with a nervous 1–0 result, dropping the Wanderers to 7th place. Rudan left the Wanderers on 16 May 2024 citing personal reasons involving health issues within his family.

=== Lederer stands down, Alen Stajcic era ===
On June 14, 2024, the long serving Chairman & highest profile co-owner of the club, Paul Lederer announced he would be stepping down from his chairman role with immediate effect, being replaced by Jefferson Cheng. The official announcement declared Lederer stood down to spend more time with his family and to serve his global business interests, but media reports suggested that the 4 man ownership group had split with Lederer over the ongoing failures of the club under his leadership and over the decision of who to appoint as Rudan's replacement. The Wanderers initially attempted to sign Nick Montgomery following his exit from Hibernian, but were rebuffed by the former Central Coast Mariners coach.

Jefferson Cheng moved quickly to appoint Alen Stajcic, with the pair having worked together during Stajcic's successful time as the Philippines women's national football team head coach, with Cheng as the team general manager. Coaching staffers Jean-Paul de Marigny, Jess Vanstrattan and Elias Boukarim all departed following Stajcic's appointment.

==== 2024–25 season ====
The post-season player clear out saw the departures of Daniel Margush, Sonny Kittel, Valentino Yuel, Doni Grdic, Marcelo, Jorrit Hendrix, Lachlan Brook and Jack Gibson. Tristan Vidackovic returned to Australia, joining the club from semi pro club CR Vasco da Gama in Portugal.

Dylan Pierias joined Adelaide United and Perth Glory signed Nathanael Blair and Adam Bugarija. Nathan Barrie had his contract extended until 2027 and the club eventually made their first new signing of the campaign by bringing Bulgarian international Bozhidar Kraev from Wellington Phoenix on a two-year contract. The team opened their campaign with a narrow 2–1 victory over NPL Queensland team Brisbane City FC in the Australia Cup. Goalkeeper Jordan Holmes was bought in to the Wanderers.

== Colours and badge ==
Western Sydney Wanderers club colours are red and black. The club's colours as well as its inaugural season kit was announced on 25 June 2012, at a press conference held at Parramatta Stadium. The kit featured a red and black hoop jersey, white shorts and black socks. The red and black colour scheme was popular during the supporter forums, and the 'hoop design' emerged along with vertical stripes as the two most popular style choices. The club's second kit, worn when playing away from home, has the same hoop design as the home kit. The first away kit included a red and white jersey, black shorts and white socks. The team's current away kit features white and gray hoops with white shorts and socks.

The club badge incorporates the key elements of the Western Sydney landscape; the mountains, valleys and winding river system that runs throughout the region. The badge includes the name of the club in Futura typeface, with white writing and a stylised W, S and W pattern to represent the club's initials. Following their success at the 2014 AFC Champions League, the club announced that a star would be added to the top of the club's badge. The new addition was not yet worn by the team until a national standard regarding such symbols was introduced by FFA in January 2015. The new standard allowed the team to wear a gold star in perpetuity and in all competitions in recognition to the Asian title won.

== Club facilities ==
The club's office and training facilities are located in the one location, Blacktown International Sportspark. This was done to foster a sense of belonging for all members of the staff no matter what position they hold at the club. In September 2015, the club announced the formation of a formal partnership with Blacktown City Council that made the Sportspark the long-term training and administrative home of the Wanderers. The club spent $15 million to create a high quality Wanderers Training & Administration Centre with a large number of soccer fields, parking and landscaping as well as a High Performance Centre providing aquatics recovery, an indoor hall, cutting edge sports science, analysis rooms, gym and hospitality facilities.

=== Stadiums ===
==== Locations ====
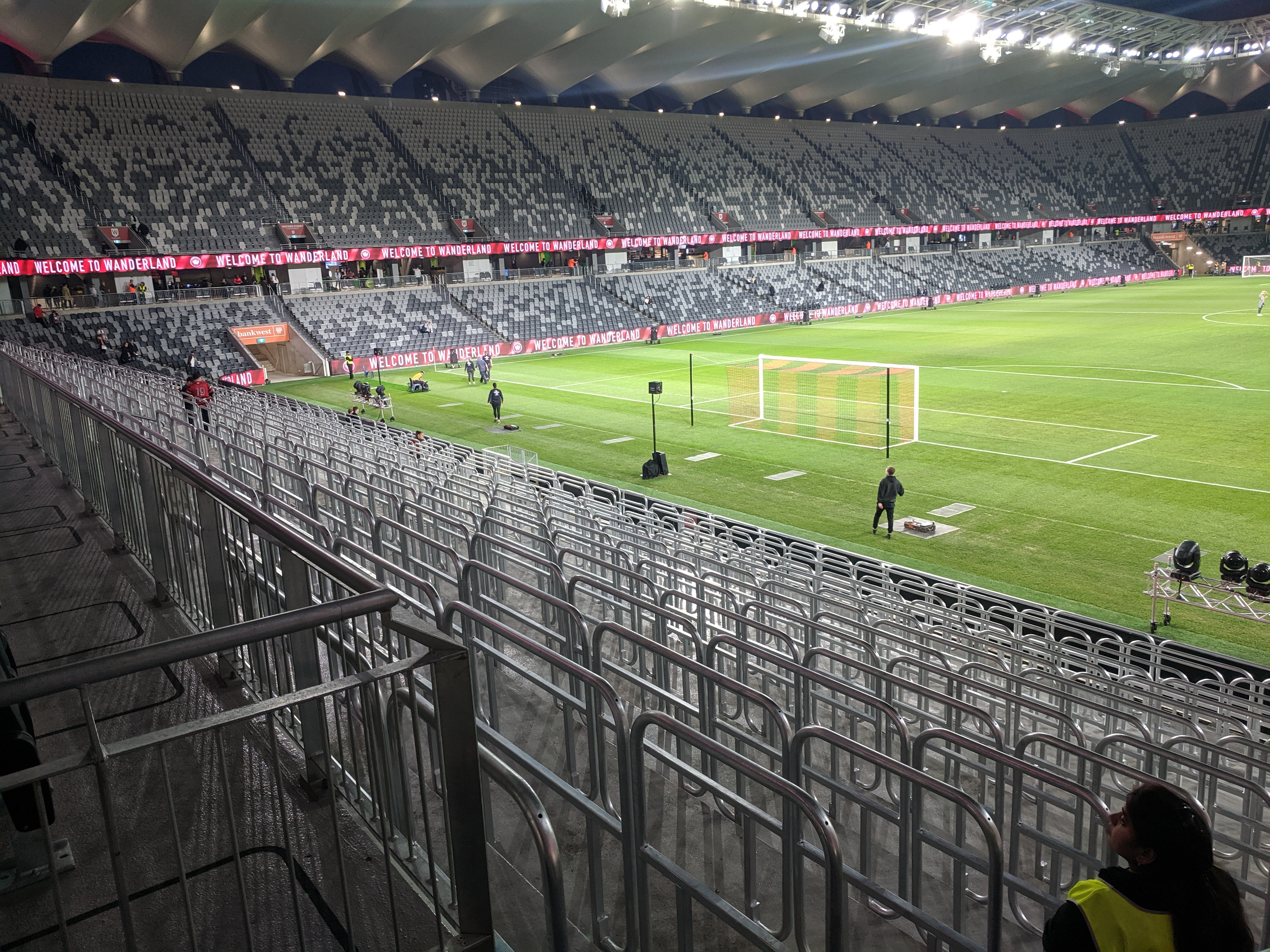
Western Sydney Stadium, current home ground

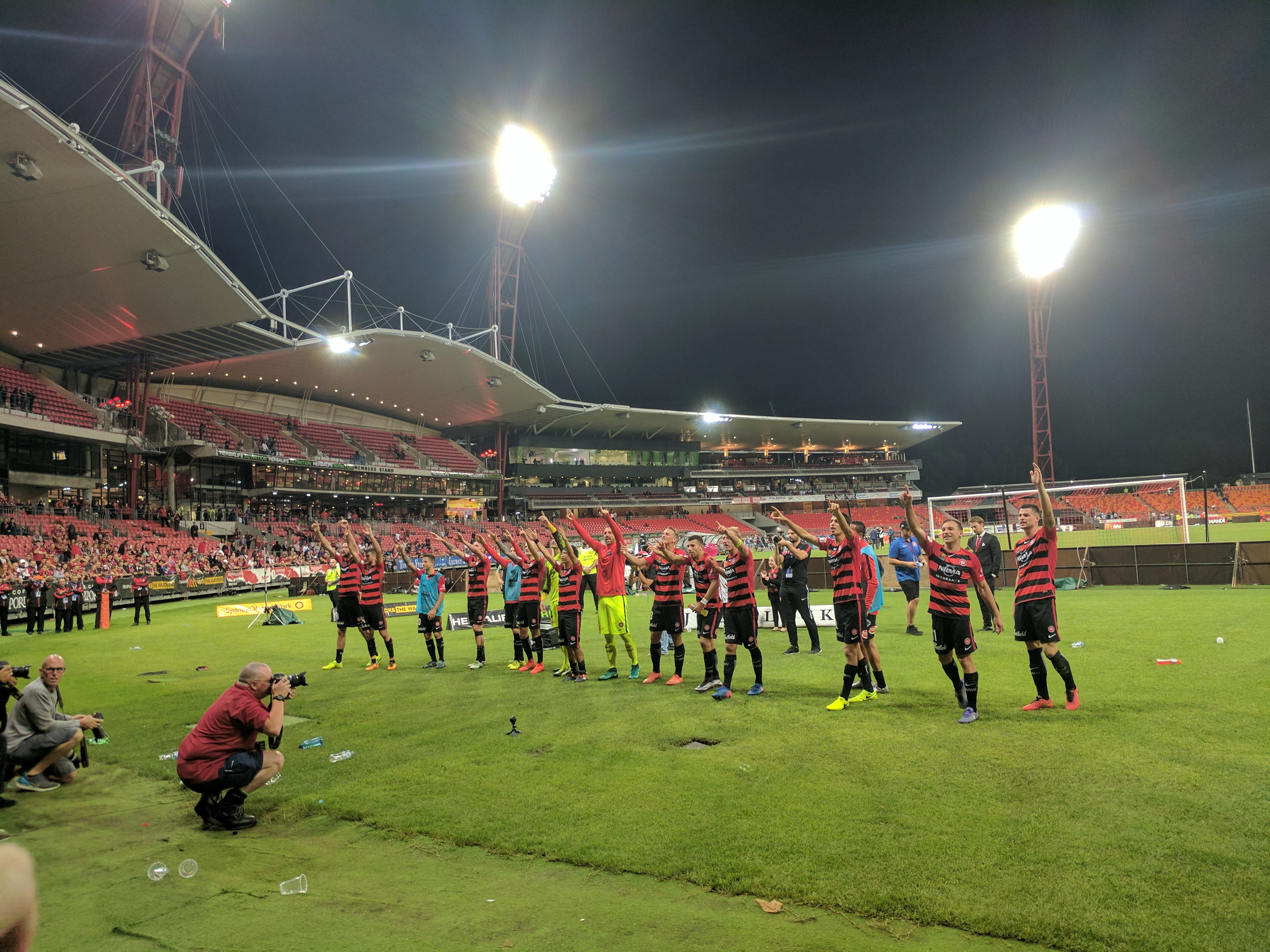
Sydney Showground Stadium, former home ground of Wanderers.

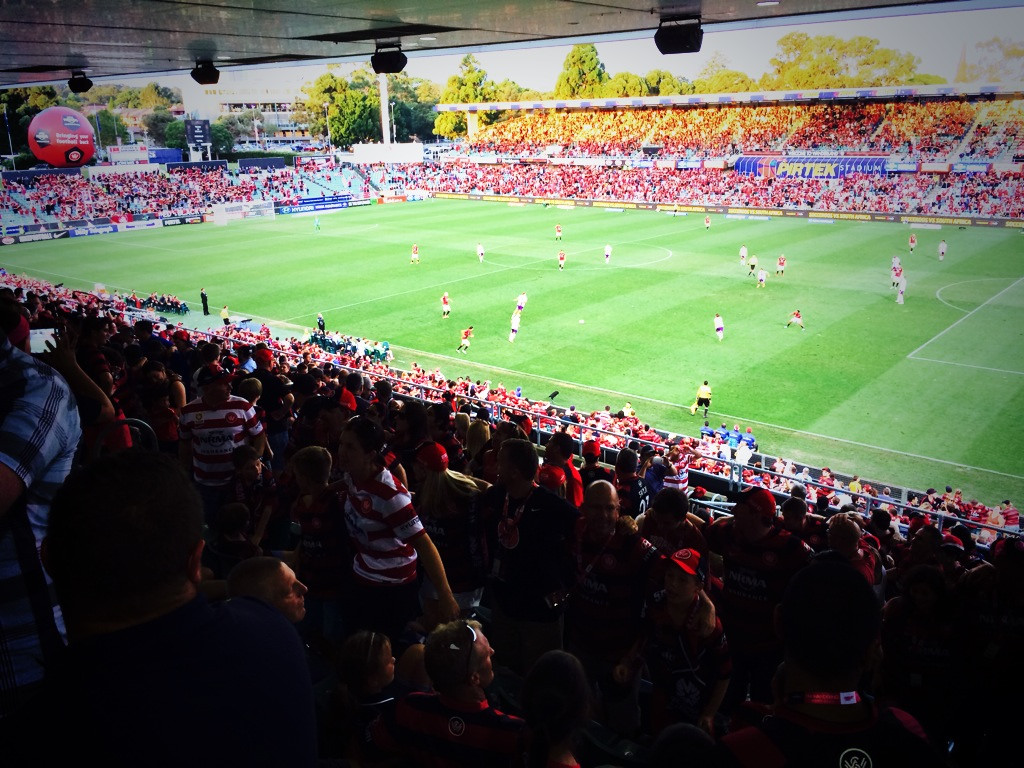
A Wanderers match in progress at Parramatta Stadium

Coordinates	Location	Stadium	Capacity	Year
33°48′29″S 150°59′59″E	Parramatta, New South Wales	Parramatta Stadium	24,000	2012–2016
33°50′35″S 151°04′04″E	Sydney Olympic Park, New South Wales	Sydney Showground Stadium	24,000	2016–2019
33°50′50″S 151°03′48″E	Sydney Olympic Park, New South Wales	Stadium Australia	83,500	2016–2019
33°48′29″S 150°59′59″E	Parramatta, New South Wales	Western Sydney Stadium	30,000	2019–

On 26 July 2012, it was officially announced that Parramatta Stadium would be the home ground of the club for all its home games. Lyall Gorman, the club's Chairman, acknowledged that the feedback he had received from the fan forums was in favour of a single home ground and that the club must be based in the Greater Western Sydney. Parramatta Stadium was seen as ideal compared to other alternatives at Sydney Olympic Park, Penrith or Campbelltown as its rectangular size is better suited for games, and it has a capacity of over 20,000. The prospect of the club one day owning its own stadium was also initially brought up. During Western Sydney Wanderers home games, the stadium is commonly referred to as "Wanderland". Named after the team name and reference to former theme park in Western Sydney, Wonderland.

Since 2010 plans to redevelop Parramatta Stadium were in the works, with some smaller expansion taking place. With soccer being played year-round at Parramatta Stadium by Western Sydney Wanderers and the Parramatta Eels rugby league club, the potential for an upgrade and expansion of the stadium was heightened. By mid-2015 a refurbishment of corporate facilities, player facilities and stadium amenities had been complete, while a decision to increase the capacity to the ground had stalled.

In September 2015, the state government announced that the stadium would be demolished and replaced with the Western Sydney Stadium, a new 30,000 seat boutique venue on the same site. Construction was completed by 2019 with the official opening on 14 April 2019. During the construction period home games were shifted for three seasons to a combination of Sydney Showground Stadium, a 25,000 seat oval-configured stadium and Stadium Australia, an 83,000 seat rectangular venue, both of which are located in Sydney Olympic Park.

Campbelltown Stadium is a sporadically used stadium for the Wanderers. The stadium has hosted two A-League games between the Wanderers & the Newcastle Jets, an FFA Cup game against Wellington Phoenix, and all 3 home matches of the 2017 AFC Champions League Group Stage. Penrith Stadium hosted a Wanderers pre-season game against Adelaide United in 2013, an A-League game against Wellington Phoenix & an FFA Cup game against Brisbane Roar in 2015, and also sees occasional use by the Women's W-League team. Marconi Stadium was another venue used for pre-season fixtures, Women & Youth team matches.

The Blacktown International Sportspark is a regular venue for the W-League and Youth League teams, with the club sharing the boutique stadium with Blacktown Spartans FC before the club training facility opened. In 2019, the club opened the Wanderers Centre of Football, a $15 million facility with a boutique stadium (Wanderers Football Park) that replicates the playing surface of the Western Sydney Stadium. The W-League team played its first game there on 2 January 2021, winning the match 2–1 against the Newcastle Jets.

== Support ==
Season	Attendance	Members	
2012–13	12,466	7,500	
2013–14	14,860	16,100	
2014–15	12,520	18,706	
2015–16	14,297	18,370	
2016–17	17,745	20,021	
2017–18	11,924	19,025	
2018–19	9,191	16,623	
2019–20	9,872*	17,325	*Affected by COVID Restrictions
2020–21	8,062	18,536	

It's hard for a coach to control what's happening on the field when the noise levels are so high.

— John Aloisi commenting on the home crowd after losing to the Wanderers in the 2015–16 A-League semi-finals, April 2016.

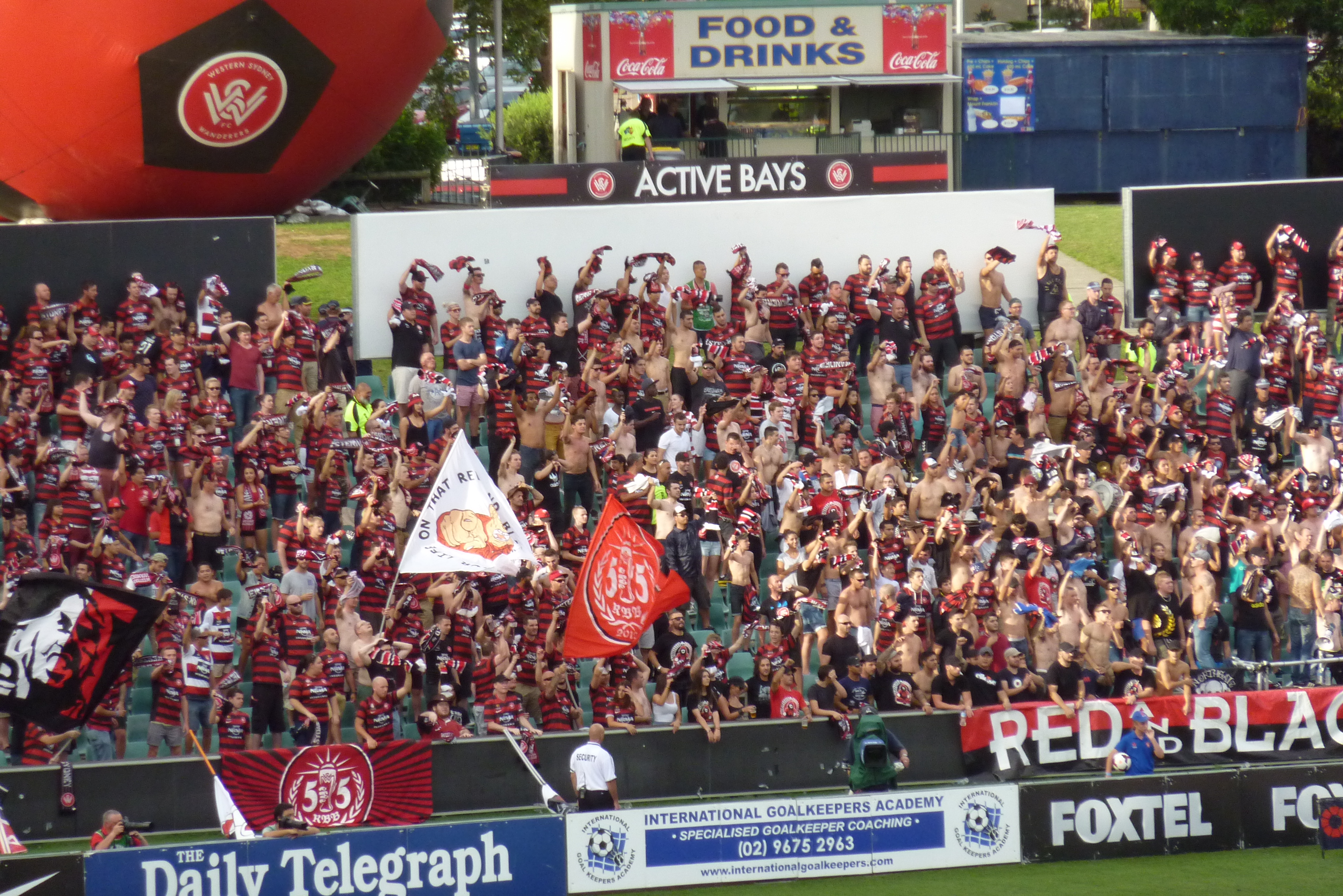
Western Sydney Wanderers fans at Parramatta Stadium

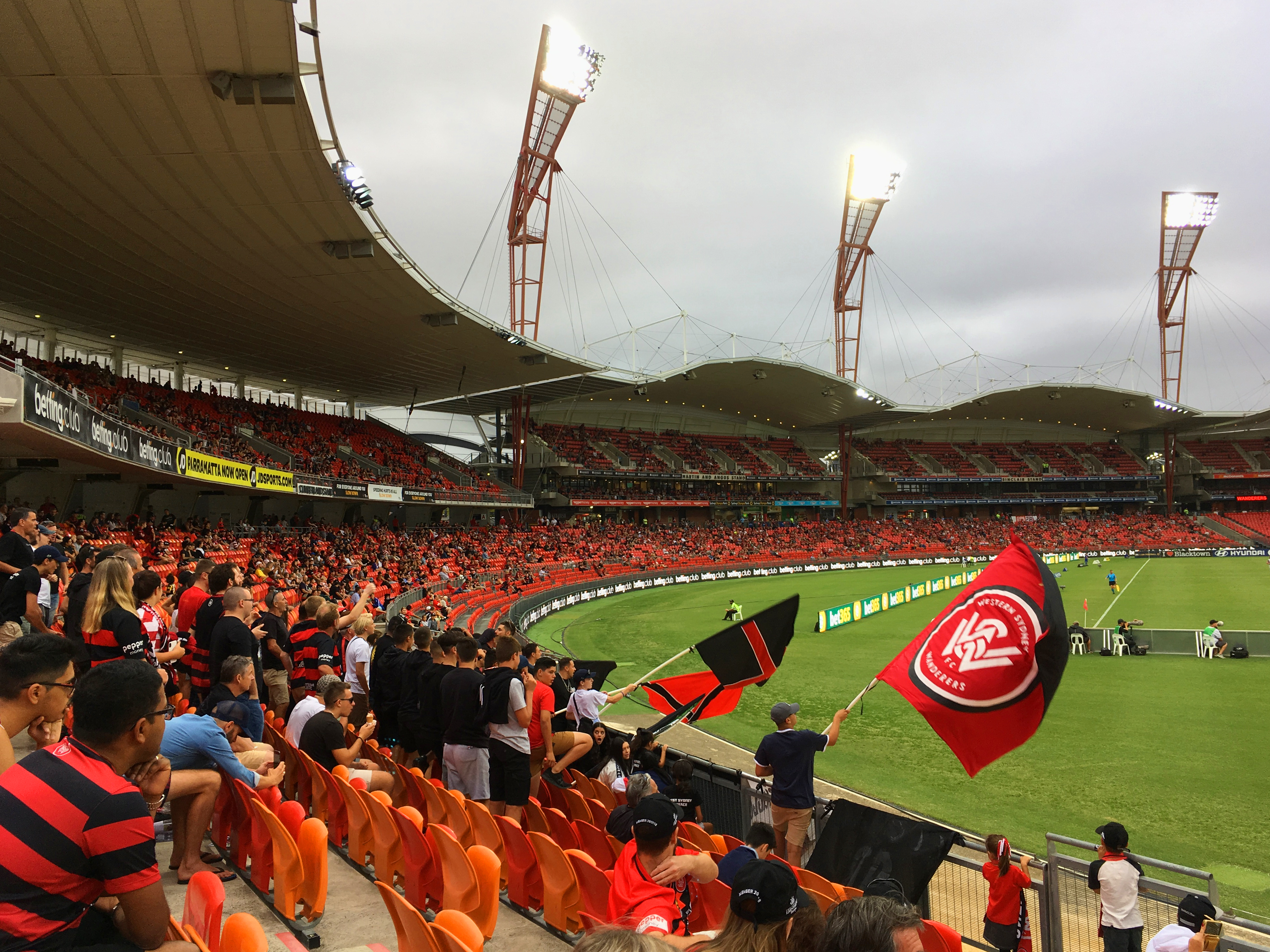
West Sydney Terrace supporters' group at Sydney Showground Stadium

Western Sydney Wanderers is one of the A-League's better supported clubs. The main supporters' group for the club is the "Red and Black Bloc" (RBB). The independent group was established in June 2012, with its founding members connecting months before that on online forums and holding meetings at Parramatta's Woolpack Hotel. The group made its first appearance attending the club's first ever game on 25 July 2012, where Wanderers played Nepean FC at Cook Park. At the match, the group gathered at the northern end of the ground and were vocal in the support of the new team. The Daily Telegraph noted the impressive debut of the group, whilst The Sydney Morning Herald described the group as "a noisy bunch on the northern hill".

The RBB have received much praise and attention for the atmosphere and passion they produce, most notably their call-and-response chant "Who do we sing for?". The RBB perform The Poznań at the 80 minute mark of matches, in recognition of the history associated with soccer in Parramatta as the first ever game of the sport in Australia was played there in the year 1880. The group is also active in local charitable causes. In the wake of the 2013 New South Wales bushfires disaster, the RBB raised $15,000 to assist the NSW Salvation Army Bushfire Appeal.

On 2 October 2014, 5,000 Wanderers' supporters attended a live screening of the second leg of the 2014 AFC Champions League Final at Centenary Square, in the Parramatta CBD. The event was followed by thousands of fans turning up to welcome home the newly crowned champions of Asia at Sydney Airport.

On 28 December 2013, supporters of Western Sydney Wanderers were involved in an altercation with a group of Melbourne Victory supporters in a Melbourne street before a league match. The incident was followed by the club's supporters igniting a flare during the match in Melbourne Rectangular Stadium. On 3 January 2014, FFA responded by charging both clubs with bringing the game into disrepute. Action was also taken against several individuals, with police later charging three supporters involved in the incident within the following months.

On 19 April 2013 Australian rock-pop band Exit Row (Andrew Torrisi, Nick Ferreri, Raf Lavorato, Jeremy Azzopardi and Aaron Tarasiewicz) released their debut single "Welcome To Our Wanderland", a Western Sydney Wanderers-anthem. The song lyric was of the club, the RBB, and Western Sydney, with the RBB chant "Who do we sing for?" used in the chorus. The song reached 93 on the Australian iTunes chart.

By the end of their inaugural season Western Sydney Wanderers had grown its membership base to 7,500 people, with the club's total match attendance at home reaching 174,520, with an average of 12,466. By the beginning of their second season, club membership had grown twofold to a set cap of 16,100 members, with over 2,000 in waiting. In addition the second season saw a rise to 193,178 total and 14,860 average attendances to home games. By their third season the club had risen to 18,706 ticketed season members.

Some notable Wanderers fans include Ian "Dicko" Dickson, Laura Dundovic, Nicole da Silva, Lucy Zelić, Paul Croft, Montaigne, Jamie Soward. and Sonny Bill Williams

== Rivalries ==
Western Sydney Wanderers vs. Sydney FC

Overall								Home						Away					
Pld	W	D	L	GF	GA	GD	Pts	W	D	L	GF	GA	GD	W	D	L	GF	GA	GD
35	10	9	16	38	51	−13	39	5	5	9	18	31	−13	5	4	7	20	20	0

Western Sydney Wanderers' local rivals are Sydney FC. The rivalry, regarded as the biggest in the A-League, is largely based upon the historical, cultural and geographical "East" versus "West" mentality that takes place throughout sport and life in Sydney, though the rivalry between the two clubs also stems from the establishment and development of the A-League, which mirrored the pre-existing cultural and social divide of the city. The two clubs first met in Wanderers inaugural season during the third round of the league on 20 October 2012, with Wanderers losing the match 1–0 after a penalty scored by Alessandro Del Piero. On 15 December 2012, in the following derby, Wanderers defeated Sydney FC 2–0 away from home with goals by Youssouf Hersi and Michael Beauchamp. During their third encounter on 23 March 2012, the two teams went on to draw 1–1 at Wanderers' home ground. The match saw much drama with nine yellows and two red cards shown on the night. In recent years, the derby has been played in front of sold-out crowds, and the support in which both clubs receive has produced an "unrivalled atmosphere and sense of occasion for a club match" in Australia.

Western Sydney Wanderers vs. Macarthur FC

Overall								Home						Away					
Pld	W	D	L	GF	GA	GD	Pts	W	D	L	GF	GA	GD	W	D	L	GF	GA	GD
8	3	3	2	11	14	−3	12	1	3	0	8	6	+2	2	0	2	3	8	−5

Another of the Western Sydney Wanderers' local rivals are Macarthur FC. The rivalry is largely based on geography, with both teams based in Greater Western Sydney. Macarthur FC represents South Western Sydney, with its home ground, Campbelltown Sports Stadium, in Campbelltown, and its temporary training ground, Fairfield Showground, located in Prairiewood, while Western Sydney Wanderers represent Greater Western Sydney, with their home ground at Western Sydney Stadium in Parramatta and their training ground at Blacktown Football Park in Rooty Hill.

The two clubs first met in the opening round of the 2020–21 A-League season on 30 December 2020, with Macarthur winning the match 1–0 after a goal scored by Mark Milligan in front of a crowd of 10,128. On 6 February 2021, Wanderers drew 2–2 away from home with goals by Graham Dorrans and Simon Cox in front of a crowd of 4,723.

== Ownership ==
Upon establishing Western Sydney Wanderers in April 2012, FFA attempted to find a backer to own and run the club. Despite several attempts by FFA, no individual owner or consortium of owners decided to take on the new Sydney-based club, thus FFA assumed ownership of the club, taking on the role first two years of the club's existence with Lyall Gorman appointed chairman.

In May 2014, it was confirmed that FFA had sold the club to a consortium headed by Australian businessman Paul Lederer, who was also appointed the role of chairman, while John Tsatsimas took up the role of the club's first CEO following his role as General Manager since the club's inception. Along with Lederer, Jefferson Cheng, Glenn Duncan and David Slade were part of the consortium of owners. The new ownership became effective as of 30 June 2014.

== Players ==
Australian squads are limited to 23 players in the league competition, five of whom may be without an Australian citizenship and three players must be under 23 years of age. The squad list includes only the principal nationality of each player; some players on the squad have dual citizenship with another country.

=== First-team squad ===
As of 25 July 2026

Note: Flags indicate national team as defined under FIFA eligibility rules; some limited exceptions apply. Players may hold more than one non-FIFA nationality.

No.	Pos.	Nation	Player
3	DF	AUS	Alex Gersbach (vice-captain)
6	MF	AUS	Steven Ugarkovic
7	FW	AUS	Aydan Hammond
8	MF	MLT	Dylan Scicluna
9	FW	JPN	Hiroshi Ibusuki
10	MF	AUS	Miguel Di Pizio
11	FW	AUS	Atiya Waraga
14	FW	AUS	Nicolas Milanovic
16	DF	AUS	Oscar Morrison
17	MF	AUS	Jarrod Carluccio
19	FW	AUS	Awan Lual (scholarship)
20	GK	AUS	Lawrence Thomas
21	FW	NZL	Liam Gillion
22	DF	AUS	Anthony Pantazopoulos
23	GK	AUS	Jordan Holmes

No.	Pos.	Nation	Player
24	DF	AUS	Nathan Barrie (scholarship)
25	DF	AUS	Emile Katrib
26	FW	AUS	Brandon Borrello (captain)
27	FW	AUS	Jai Rose (scholarship)
28	MF	AUS	Josh Cetinic
29	FW	AUS	Georgio Hassarati
32	MF	AUS	Angus Thurgate
33	DF	ARG	Germán Ferreyra (vice-captain)
34	DF	NZL	Ricky Fransen (scholarship)
35	DF	AUS	Marcus Savic
36	DF	AUS	Panashe Madanha
37	FW	AUS	Alaat Abdul-Rahman (scholarship)
55	GK	AUS	Tristan Vidackovic
—	DF	AUS	Ben Mewett (scholarship)

=== Out on loan ===
Note: Flags indicate national team as defined under FIFA eligibility rules; some limited exceptions apply. Players may hold more than one non-FIFA nationality.

No.	Pos.	Nation	Player

=== Youth ===
Players to have been featured in a first-team matchday squad for Western Sydney Wanderers.

Note: Flags indicate national team as defined under FIFA eligibility rules; some limited exceptions apply. Players may hold more than one non-FIFA nationality.

No.	Pos.	Nation	Player

== Club officials ==
Western Sydney Wanderers staff
Management (Australia) Paul Lederer – Owner (Philippines) Jefferson Cheng – Owner (Australia) Glenn Duncan – Owner (Australia) David Slade – Owner (Australia) Scott Hudson – CEO	Coaches (Australia) Ufuk Talay – Head Coach (Australia) Damir Prodanovic – Assistant Coach (Serbia) Miloš Ninković – Assistant Coach (Australia) Chris Bowling – Goalkeeper Coach (Australia) Ray Younis – Strength and Conditioning Coach (South Korea) Kim Gyebeom – Head Performance Analyst (Australia) Lachlan Harris – Assistant Video Analyst (Australia) Corey Gameiro – Head of Youth Development (Australia) Ivan Jolic – Head of Academy Coaches (Australia) Jose Bello – Wanderers NPL Academy Coach (Australia) Mal Impiombato – Director of Football

=== Head coach record ===
- Italics † – Denotes that the manager was only a caretaker during his tenure

Period	Name	G	W	D	L	%	PPG	Honours
2012–17	(Australia) Tony Popovic	180	76	44	60	42.2%	1.49	A-League Premiers: 2012–13; A-League Coach of the Year: 2012–13; AFC Champions League: 2014; Asian Coach of the Year: 2014
2017	(Australia) Hayden Foxe †	6	1	4	1	16.7%	1.40	
2017–18	(Spain) Josep Gombau	22	7	5	10	31.8%	1.18	
2018–20	(Germany) Markus Babbel	48	15	8	25	31.3%	1.10	
2020	(Australia) Jean-Paul de Marigny	12	5	4	3	41.7%	1.83	
2020–22	(Wales) Carl Robinson	35	11	11	13	31.4%	1.26	
2022–2024	(Australia) Marko Rudan	47	16	14	17	34.04%	1.31	
2024–2026	(Australia) Alen Stajcic	39	16	10	13	41.02%	n/a	

== Captaincy history ==
Wanderers captaincy history

Dates	Name	Notes	Honours (as captain)
2012–2014	(Australia) Michael Beauchamp	Inaugural club captain	2012–13 A-League Premiership
2014–2016	(Australia) Nikolai Topor-Stanley		2014 AFC Champions League
2016–2017	(Spain) Dimas Delgado	First foreign captain	
2017–2018	(Australia) Robert Cornthwaite		
2018–2019	(Australia) Brendan Hamill		
2019–2020	(Australia) Mitchell Duke		
2020–21	(Australia) Dylan McGowan		
2021–22	(Australia) Rhys Williams		
2022–24	(Brazil) Marcelo		
2024–	(Australia) Lawrence Thomas		

== Records ==
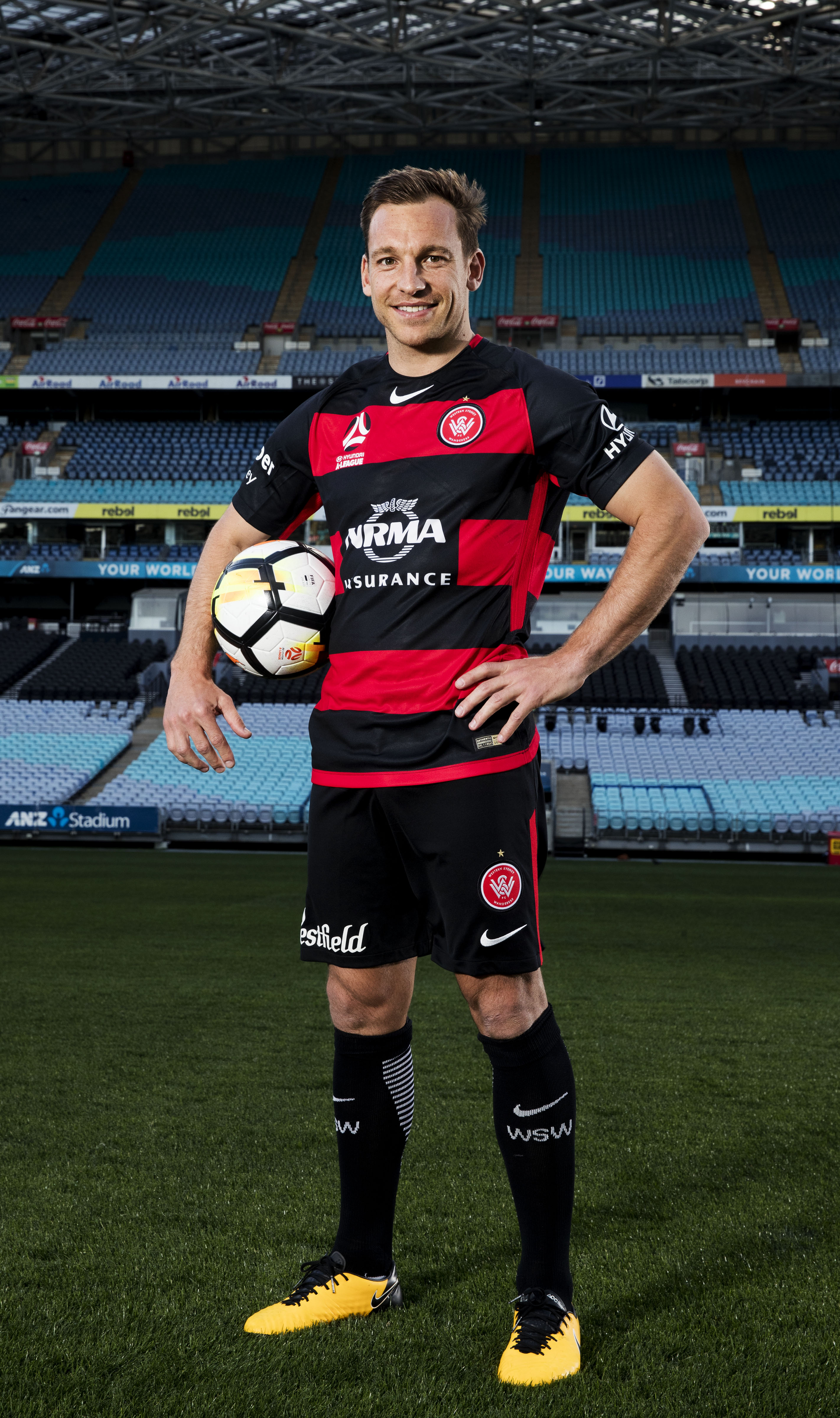
Brendon Santalab holds the club record for all-time top-scorer

Mark Bridge currently holds the team record for total number of games played with 141 matches. Nikolai Topor-Stanley has the second most appearances for the club with 125 matches. Brendon Santalab is the third most capped player with 114 matches.

Western Sydney Wanderers all-time highest goalscorer in all competitions is Brendon Santalab with 41 goals. The player with the second most goals scored for Wanderers is Mark Bridge, who has scored 38 goals for the club, followed by Oriol Riera with 31 goals scored in all competitions.

Wanderers highest home A-League attendance at Parramatta Stadium is 19,627 for a Sydney Derby match on 16 January 2016, whilst the club's highest attendance in any competition at Parramatta Stadium is 20,053, set in the 2014 AFC Champions League Final first leg against Al-Hilal FC. The highest home attendance at any stadium for Western Sydney Wanderers is 61,880 for a Sydney Derby match at Stadium Australia on Saturday 9 October 2016.

== Team records ==
=== Season-by-season record ===
This is a partial list overview of the last five seasons the Wanderers have completed.
For the full season-by-season history, see List of Western Sydney Wanderers FC seasons.

Season	League									Finals	Australia Cup	Other competitions		Top goalscorer(s)		Coach
Season	Division	P	W	D	L	GF	GA	Pts	Pos	Finals	Australia Cup	ACL	CWC	Name(s)	Goals	Coach
2021–22	A-League Men	26	6	9	11	30	38	27	10th	—	R16	—	—	(Israel) Tomer Hemed	6	(Wales) Carl Robinson (Australia) Marko Rudan
2022–23	A-League Men	26	11	8	7	43	27	41	4th	EF	PR	—	—	(Australia) Brandon Borrello	13	(Australia) Marko Rudan
2023–24	A-League Men	27	11	4	12	44	48	37	7th	—	QF	—	—	(Australia) Lachlan Brook	14	(Australia) Marko Rudan
2024–25	A-League Men	26	13	7	6	58	40	46	4th	EF	QF	—	—	(Australia) Nicolas Milanovic	13	(Australia) Alen Stajcic
2025–26	A-League Men	26	5	6	15	27	43	21	12th	—	R16	—	—	(Bulgaria) Bozhidar Kraev	7	(Australia) Alen Stajcic (Australia) Gary van Egmond

=== A-League Grand Finals ===
Season	Opponent	Score	Goalscorer(s)	Location	Attendance
2013	Central Coast Mariners	0–2	—	Allianz Stadium, Sydney	42,102
2014	Brisbane Roar	1–2*	Špiranović 56'	Suncorp Stadium, Brisbane	51,153
2016	Adelaide United	1–3	Neville 58'	Adelaide Oval, Adelaide	50,119

* – Match was decided during extra time

=== Continental record ===
Season	Competition	Round	Club	Home	Away	Aggregate
2014	AFC Champions League	Group H	(South Korea) Ulsan Hyundai	1–3	2–0	1st
2014	AFC Champions League	Group H	(China) Guizhou Renhe	5–0	1–0	1st
2014	AFC Champions League	Group H	(Japan) Kawasaki Frontale	1–0	1–2	1st
2014	AFC Champions League	Round of 16	(Japan) Sanfrecce Hiroshima	2–0	1–3	3–3 (a)
2014	AFC Champions League	Quarter-finals	(China) Guangzhou Evergrande	1–0	1–2	2–2 (a)
2014	AFC Champions League	Semi-finals	(South Korea) FC Seoul	2–0	0–0	2–0
2014	AFC Champions League	Final	(Saudi Arabia) Al-Hilal	1–0	0–0	1–0
2015	AFC Champions League	Group H	(Japan) Kashima Antlers	1–2	3–1	3rd
2015	AFC Champions League	Group H	(China) Guangzhou Evergrande	2–3	2–0	3rd
2015	AFC Champions League	Group H	(South Korea) FC Seoul	1–1	0–0	3rd
2017	AFC Champions League	Group F	(Japan) Urawa Red Diamonds	0–4	1–6	4th
2017	AFC Champions League	Group F	(China) Shanghai SIPG	3–2	1–5	4th
2017	AFC Champions League	Group F	(South Korea) FC Seoul	2–3	3–2	4th

== Honours ==
=== Domestic ===
Chart of yearly table positions for Western Sydney Wanderers in A-League Men

- A-League Men Championship
  - Runners-up (3): 2013, 2014, 2016
- A-League Men Premiership
  - Winners (1): 2012–13
  - Runners-up (2): 2013–14, 2015–16

=== Continental ===
- AFC Champions League Elite
  - Champions (1): 2014

=== International ===
- FIFA Club World Cup
  - Sixth-place (1): 2014

=== Award ===
- AFC Club of the Year: 2014

== See also ==
- Expansion of the A-League

== Notes ==
Achievements
Preceded by Guangzhou Evergrande (China)	Champions of Asia; 2014	Succeeded by Guangzhou Evergrande (China)
