= John Tsatsimas =

Chief Executive Officer of Football NSW

John Tsatsimas is the Chief Executive Officer of Football NSW. He w as the CEO of Western Sydney Wanderers FC from 2014 to 2022.

== Career ==
In 2005, Tsatsimas joined Newcastle Jets as the club's legal councilor, before spending four seasons as chief executive officer. After helping the transition in ownership from Con Constantine to Nathan Tinkler and the Hunter Sports Group in September 2010, Tsatsimas resigned to spend more time with his family.

In June 2012, Tsatsimas was appointed general manager at Western Sydney Wanderers. Following the sale of Western Sydney Wanderers, the new owners announced Tsatsimas as the club's first CEO on 4 June 2014. In February 2022, he announced he would be stepping down from the role at the conclusion of the 2021–22 season.

In November 2022, Tsatsimas began in the role of CEO of Football NSW.
