= Expansion of the A-Leagues =

Expansion of the A-Leagues is the ongoing process of establishing new clubs in the A-Leagues. The A-League Men was established to replace the National Soccer League as the top division in the Australian football league system. It is the only professional football league in the country. Founded in 2004 with eight teams commencing competition in the 2005–06 season, the league has since expanded into new markets across Australia and New Zealand. From the 2024–25 A-League Men season, 13 clubs will compete in the league, after Auckland Football Club was granted an expansion license.

There is also a long term prospect of teams being added to the A-League Men from a second division that involves Promotion and relegation. Football Australia and the Association of Australian Football Clubs, a group of clubs that currently exist in the state and regional "Member Federations" have been working to implement a second division team with an eventual goal that a football pyramid that would see clubs move between the A-League Men and the second tier, and between the second tier and state leagues.

== Original teams ==
Progression of A-League Men expansion
Season	No.
2005–2009	8
2009–2010	10
2010–2011	11
2011–2019	10
2019–2020	11
2020–2024	12
2024–2025	13
2025–present	12

Football Federation Australia (FFA) exercised caution when forming the A-League Men in early 2004; in terms of selecting who was to be part of the new league. FFA decided upon a 'one city – one team' principle in order to protect the initial development of the foundation clubs.

The initial eight teams selected were Adelaide United, Brisbane Roar (formerly Queensland Roar), Central Coast Mariners, Melbourne Victory, Newcastle Jets, Perth Glory, Sydney and New Zealand Knights. Of these 8 clubs, only the New Zealand Knights have failed to survive, folding after the 2006–07 season.

== Expansion ==

Before the introduction of the A-League Men, FFA chairman Frank Lowy speculated that he hoped to expand the league into other cities, citing Adelaide, Canberra, Hobart, Wollongong, Coffs Harbour, Geelong, Bendigo, Cairns, Ballarat, Albury-Wodonga, Launceston, Christchurch, Auckland, Sunshine Coast and Darwin.

=== Wellington (2007) ===
In late October 2006, as a result of low crowd attendance at North Harbour Stadium in Auckland and continual poor on-field performances, rumours began to circulate that the FFA was considering revoking the A-League licence of the only New Zealand based A-League club, New Zealand Knights, and granting it to a new club that would enter the competition in the 2007–08 season. The FFA had continued to express angst at low attendance numbers, poor on-field performance and the lack of domestically developed players.

On 14 December, the FFA announced that it had revoked the competition licence held by the Knights' owners, and on 19 March 2007 after several delays, Wellington Phoenix was selected as the successor to the New Zealand Knights.

=== Gold Coast and Townsville (2009) ===
In 2009, the league expanded in Gold Coast with the new club Gold Coast United and in Townsville with the club North Queensland Fury. Expansion into these new regions was seen as critical to the success of the 2022 Australian FIFA World Cup bid. In 2011, after the failed bid, North Queensland Fury was removed from the league due to financial instability. In 2012 Fury re-formed to participate in the National Premier League Queensland. In 2012, the FFA revoked Clive Palmer's Gold Coast United A-League licence.

=== Melbourne Heart (2010) ===
After Melbourne Victory announced they would not be playing at the new Melbourne Rectangular Stadium unless it had a capacity of at least 30,000, the Victorian Government suggested a second Melbourne team would play there. A consortium of investors made it clear that an operating budget of 5 to 6 million dollars per annum was feasible and a letter of interest from the football club had been sent to the FFA.

In June 2008, it was revealed that three separate consortiums were bidding for second Melbourne franchise licence. In September, a bid led by Victorian businessman Peter Sidwell, operating under the working title Melbourne Heart Syndicate, received exclusive negotiating rights for an A-League licence. Sidwell's group was awarded the licence to join the 2010–11 season on 12 June 2009. The new club was named Melbourne Heart Football Club. Prior to the start of the 2014–15 season, the club was acquired by the City Football Group, subsequently being rebranded as Melbourne City.

=== Sydney Rovers (2010) ===
The club was intended to be the 12th official franchise in the A-League, joining the league in the 2011–12 season. Ian Rowden's group was awarded the licence on 29 September 2009. However, the team folded before playing a single game, and on 10 December 2010, the licence was formally withdrawn by the FFA.

=== Western Sydney (2012) ===
After the scrapping of Sydney Rovers in 2010, the FFA approached the Greater Western Sydney Football Group, one of the unsuccessful bidders in the second expansion round, to assess their readiness to enter the competition in the 2012–13 season. The proposed team, based at Parramatta Stadium in Parramatta and named "The Wanderers," was considered. However, after consultations, the idea was ultimately abandoned.

On 4 April 2012, FFA CEO Ben Buckley announced the introduction of a new Sydney club, Western Sydney Wanderers, for the 2012–13 season, supported by an $8 million federal grant. Initially owned by the FFA due to the lack of a backer, the club was later sold to a consortium of businessmen led by Paul Lederer in June 2014.

=== Western United and Macarthur (2019 and 2020) ===
In November 2016, A-League chief Greg O'Rourke outlined a timetable for the possible addition of two new teams for the 2018–19 season. Bids were explored by several clubs and consortia, including those from Perth, Brisbane, Southern Sydney, Sunshine Coast, Hobart, Auckland, South East Melbourne, South Melbourne, Canberra, and Wollongong. The FFA later confirmed that two clubs would be added to the league for the 2019–20 season. Initially, up to 15 bids were submitted, but by mid-2018, the number was reduced to 10. By the end of August 2018, the FFA had accepted bids from eight consortiums representing the following locations: South West Sydney Macarthur, Southern Expansion (Sydney), Wollongong Wolves, Team 11 (South-East Melbourne), South Melbourne, Western Melbourne Group, Ipswich (Queensland), and Canberra. In October 2018, this group was narrowed down further to just six bids, with Wollongong and Ipswich eliminated from contention.

In December 2018, the FFA announced the acceptance of Western United's bid, with the team joining the league in the 2019–20 season and playing at Kardinia Park in Geelong for their first three seasons while Wyndham City Stadium is constructed in Tarneit. The second accepted bid was from Macarthur, who joined the league in the 2020–21 season. In August 2025, the Western United club's license to compete in the A-League Men competitions has been stripped by Football Australia's independent first instance board, which oversees club licensing. The club has appealed the decision and the board will consider the club's appeal and issue a decision no later than 25 August 2025. but was wound-up by the Federal Court of Australia on 28 August 2025. On 2 September, Football Australia's Appeals and Entry Control Body adjourned its decision on the withdrawal of Western United's licence until 9 September. On 19 May 2026, Football Australia announced that Western United did not satisfy the mandatory licensing criteria for the upcoming 2026–27 season. On 10 August 2026, the Australian Professional Leagues had announced that it had terminated the club's A-Leagues Men & Womens' licenses.

=== Auckland and Canberra (2024) ===
In March 2023, the Australian Professional Leagues (APL), which has since taken over administration and ownership of the A-League from Football Australia (formerly known as the FFA), announced that the next two expansion clubs would be based in Canberra and Auckland.

In October, the APL confirmed that it intended to award the Auckland license to the owner of Premier League club AFC Bournemouth, Bill Foley, subject to regulatory approval. The following month, it was confirmed that the license had been awarded to Foley, with the men's side to join the A-League Men from the 2024–25 season, whilst a women's side will join the A-League Women the following season.

On 14 March 2024, Auckland were officially launched, with their name, logo, identity and nickname, the Black Knights, revealed.

== Bidding process in 2004 ==
=== Brisbane Strikers ===
Queensland Strikers were one of the twelve teams that bid for the A-League, backed by the NSL team Brisbane Strikers. They were beaten by the other Brisbane bid, the Queensland Lions (now Brisbane Roar). Many fans of the Strikers disagreed with this decision and thought that supporting the Lions would be uncomfortable.

=== Marconi Stallions ===
In 2004, a group of Marconi Stallions owners tried to secure a license for the inaugural league. They were considered top contenders to join the league alongside South Melbourne.

=== Melbourne Dragons ===
Melbourne Dragons initially tried to start an NSL club, but following the demise of the league the attempted to join the A-League. The group was led by Liu Bing and planned to play out of either, Lakeside Stadium, Olympic Park Stadium, Princes Park or Docklands Stadium.

=== Melbourne United ===
An additional Melbourne-based bid was submitted under the name of Melbourne United, with plans to draw from the Melbourne Knights.

=== South Melbourne ===
When the A-League started, South Melbourne announced that it had ambitions to join the league and that they deserved to be in the league. They were seen as top contenders for the new league.

=== Sydney Blues ===
Sydney Blues was a bid by consortium led by Nick Poltis and the Sydney Roosters, who formerly bankrolled Sydney Olympic. Harry Kewell also supported the bid.

=== Victorian Soccer Federation ===
One of the 12 bids the Australian Soccer Association received was revealed to be backed by the Victorian Soccer Federation (now Football Victoria). The bid had ties with AC Milan.

=== Wollongong Wolves ===
Wollongong Wolves were amongst the teams considered for the new national league.

== Bidding process in 2008 ==
=== Canberra ===
A-League4Canberra was a bid led by TransACT CEO Ivan Slavich, with notable foundation members including former Socceroos Carl Valeri and Ned Zelic. The bid aimed to play games at Canberra Stadium. However, following low attendance at A-League games held there, doubts about the viability of the bid emerged.

On 10 May 2012, with the FFA announcing that A-League expansion beyond ten teams was on hold until 2015 in the wake of the establishment of a West Sydney-based side in time for the 2012–2013 season, A-League4Canberra suspended its efforts to secure a team for the Australian capital city, and the bid group was wound up. There was no connection to Capital Football owned and operated W-League club Canberra United.

=== Gold Coast Galaxy ===
The other Gold Coast bid backed by Fred Taplin, failed to beat out Clive Palmer's Gold Coast United bid. The bid also had ties to MLS team LA Galaxy.

=== Melbourne City ===
Not to be confused with the current A-League side Melbourne City, a Melbourne-based bid under the name of Melbourne City was led by businessman Colin De Lutis. He claimed support from several prominent Melbourne businessmen, including Collingwood President Eddie McGuire. Melbourne Victory shareholder Joe Mirabella was also associated with the bid.

=== Northern Thunder ===
The first bid for the Townsville A-League license was backed by Melissa Fischer and went under the name Northern Thunder. However, the bid did not raise the capital needed to be granted the licence.

=== Penrith ===
Led by Nepean District Soccer Football Association alongside local businessmen. The bid also had the backing of the Penrith Panthers and would play in Penrith Stadium.

=== South Coast Football ===
In 2008, South Coast Football, led by Eddy De Gabriele and inspired by Wollongong City Council, launched a bid to join the A-League. Former Socceroos Scott Chipperfield and Tim Cahill both supported the bid, with plans to establish a football academy in the region. Additionally, Bruce Gordon, Australia's 14th wealthiest person, was rumoured to have backed the bid.

=== Southern Cross ===
Formed by former South Melbourne president Jim Marinos, Southern Cross planned to base their operations out of Casey Fields, similar to the Melbourne Heart bid.

=== Tasmania United ===
A taskforce started by Football Tasmania, led by businessman John McGirr, was started to find funding for an A-League team in Tasmania. The name Tasmania United was registered by the taskforce and it was suggested that the team play games in both Hobart and Launceston alongside joining the league in the 2011/12 season. Sheik Mohammed Hussein Ali Al Amoudi was also linked with the bid. Andrew Wilkie also supported building a stadium at Macquarie Point before the AFL stadium was set to be built there.

== Bidding process in 2018 ==
=== Belgravia Leisure ===
Backed by Geoff Lord, the bid planned on being based in inner-Melbourne.

=== Brisbane City FC ===
Brisbane City was the only Brisbane-based bid for the A-League after Brisbane Strikers withdrew from the process. The bid went under the name Brisbane City Gladiators and planned on playing in a refurbished Ballymore Stadium. Their bid was not included in the final eight bid shortlist considered by the FFA in 2018.

=== Brisbane Strikers ===
Brisbane Strikers pulled out of the bidding process before the deadline citing issues with Football Australia. The bid planned on playing out of an upgraded Perry Park.

=== Canberra ===
The second Canberra A-League bid, CBR & Capital Region A-League Bid, first started fact finding operations following FFA chairman, Steven Lowey, telling the media in October 2016 that the FFA was planning on a new round of expansion for the A-League. In 2017, the FFA cooled on the idea of expansion and the Canberra bid remained dormant.

In February 2018, the FFA formally announced the A-League would expand to 12 teams and opened up expressions of interests (EOI).

CBR & Capital Region A-League Bid, officially submitted its EOI and launched its bid in May 2018 along with fourteen other bids. The bid leader was revealed to be ONTHEGO Sportswear employee Michael Caggiano. The bid team revealed the new Canberra bid would be built around a community ownership model using the DFB and Bundesliga principles of 50+1, with the community owning the majority of the voting rights. The bid was shortlisted by the FFA on 29 June 2018 and progressed to the next more detailed submission phase along with nine other bids.

The Canberra and broader region bid was included in the final eight bids considered by the FFA in 2018, though it eventually lost out to Western Melbourne and South West/Macarthur. Despite this setback, the consortium has since stated they are "confident" of entering the A-League by late 2020 after discussions with the FFA, with the prospect of either joining the league as the 13th active club or perhaps replacing the New Zealand-based Wellington Phoenix.

On 25 August 2020, the previous Canberra bidding team announced a new proposal to obtain a licence for a Canberra-based A-League team had been submitted to the FFA. The new bid was named Capital Region Football Collective (CRFC). The official proposal submitted had multi-million dollar backing from local and international sources. The proposal sought a licence to be issued with a view for a team to enter the league in the 2021/22 season. The bid team expressed their desire to secure the 13th A-League licence, however they would also be open to buying out the Central Coast Mariners' licence if the FFA did not want to issue a new licence. Mike Charlesworth had put the Mariners licence up for sale a week earlier. The Canberra bidding team stipulated a condition of a four to six week timeframe on receiving a final answer from the FFA.

=== Fremantle City ===
Fremantle City was the only Perth-based bid for the A-League and planned to play out of a redeveloped Fremantle Oval. The bid was reportedly in contact with Juventus regarding a football partnership.

=== Gold Coast ===
In August 2017 it was announced that previous A-League club Gold Coast United had been reformed to represent the Gold Coast region in the Queensland National Premier League. As a part of the club's revival, chairman Danny Maher announced the club has intentions to re-enter the A-League and the W-League. Gold Coast was not included in the final eight bids considered by the FFA.

=== Ipswich/Western Pride ===
Expansion into the Western suburbs of Brisbane has been boosted by the growth in population projected over the coming decades. Ipswich Mayor Paul Pisasale promised in August 2013 to build a 15,000-seat stadium at North Ipswich Oval if a licence was secured. The region's bid for an A-League expansion position is further helped by the strong community ties of current NPL Queensland side Western Pride. The bid was included in the eight bids considered by the FFA in August 2018, though later rejected by the FFA in October 2018. There were also meetings between the Brisbane Strikers and the Ipswich bid playing out of stadium in Springfield.

=== Team 11 (South East Melbourne) ===
A Victorian-based consortium, Team 11, bid for an A-League licence, with the team aiming to represent and play in Melbourne's South East, becoming the third A-league franchise in the state. The bid was assisted by the multicultural population of 1,700,000+ people residing in the region, which includes a high football participation rate. The region has also been left out of most national sporting competitions, including AFL, NRL, and until 2019, the NBL.

The six biggest football clubs in the local government areas of the Casey and Dandenong regions united for an official A-League bid in late 2016. The region is considered one of Australia's fastest-growing in terms of population.

On 30 April 2018, the bid announced an intended home stadium location, to be located next to Dandenong railway station on the site of the former stock yards. Casey Fields would be used as the club's training ground and administration base. South East Melbourne was included in the final eight bids considered by the FFA in 2018, but ultimately failed because of concerns about the consortium's ability to fund the ambitious project

=== South Melbourne ===
Former NSL powerhouse and OFC Team of the Century South Melbourne launched a bid to receive an expansion license for the 2018–19 A-League season. The club argued it had an advantage by possessing the required $5 million capital, access to the Lakeside Stadium and ability to simultaneously launch a W-League team. South Melbourne was included in the final eight bids considered by the FFA in 2018.

=== South West Sydney FC ===
The other half to the eventually successful South West Sydney/Macarthur bid, this bid had support from the Mayor of Liverpool Ned Mannoun with plans to build a 35,000 seat stadium in Liverpool and potential backing from Fenway Sports Group, owners of Liverpool FC.

=== Southern Sydney ===
Southern Sydney has been identified by the FFA as a possible site for future expansion. The club would likely be based between the Illawarra and Sutherland Shire and include the St George area of Southern Sydney. The area has a large number of junior soccer players but may be seen as encroaching on Sydney's and to a lesser extent Western Sydney Wanderers's supporter bases. By mid-2018, an additional bid had emerged, developing into a joint venture between South West Sydney and Macarthur. Both Southern Sydney and South West Sydney/Macarthur were included in the final eight bids considered by the FFA in 2018, with the latter bid being successful.

=== Sunshine Coast ===
A consortium led by Indian billionaire, Nirav Tripathi, planned on joining the A-League with a team based in the Sunshine Coast. The bid received support from NPL team Sunshine Coast and included plans to play games at the Sunshine Coast Stadium.

=== Tasmania ===
In October 2007, Football Federation Tasmania CEO Martin Shaw suggested that Tasmania would be a viable location for an A-League club, mentioning the fact that it would need support from state and local government. It has been suggested that such a team would play games in both Hobart and Launceston.

In 2008, a Tasmanian Football Taskforce was formed to investigate an A-League bid. The Taskforce officially registered Tasmania United Football Club and submitted a bid for the 2011–12 season, launching the bid to the media on 25 November. A sheikh from Dubai was linked with Tasmania's bid for an A-League team.

A Tasmania state representative team was formed and subsequently played friendlies, with one including a game against Melbourne Victory. A survey on the Tasmania United website found that the nickname "Wolves" was the most popular name amongst supporters of the consortium. Tasmania's bid was rejected by the FFA at the middle stage of the bidding process, in June 2018.

=== West Adelaide ===
Former NSL team West Adelaide announced an intention to enter the league as a second Adelaide team with advances made to make former Liverpool player Robbie Fowler their manager. There were rumours that there was an Adelaide City backed bid called Adelaide 11. West Adelaide was not included in the final eight bids considered by the FFA in 2018. The chairman of West Adelaide stated that this was due to the geographic area of the bid.

=== Wollongong ===
By 2016, Wollongong Wolves had begun to build momentum to push for admission into the A-League. An Australia Cup round of 32 tie against Sydney on 10 August 2016 (a Wednesday evening) attracted a crowd in excess of 9,000, demonstrating the potential of the Wolves. A Wolves submission was included in the eight bids considered by the FFA in August 2018, though later rejected by the FFA the following October.

== Relocation ==
=== Wellington Phoenix ===
In 2018, there was speculation the Wellington Phoenix license was up for sale for $6 million and there were many different suitors including South Melbourne, Brisbane Strikers, Southern Sydney, and South West Sydney, all of which were bidding for the two A-League expansion slots in 2018. Wellington Phoenix Chairman, Rob Morrison, dismissed these approaches, "For the record the Phoenix are not doing any deal with South Melbourne, we are not in negotiations with them and the last official contact that the Phoenix had with South Melbourne was August 2016...This is pure fairy tale stuff. The Phoenix have made no approach to the Brisbane Strikers, we have had no discussions with them and there are no talks on going. Can we make it any clearer than that?"

=== Central Coast Mariners ===
In 2020 the Central Coast Mariner license was reportedly up for sale for $4 million with potential suitors including Manchester United with the club moving to North Sydney based out of either North Sydney Oval or Brookvale Oval, a Brisbane consortium and a Canberra consortium.

=== Melbourne Heart ===
Prior to the acquisition of Melbourne Heart (now Melbourne City) by the City Football Group, South Melbourne offered $3.5 million to purchase Heart's license to play in the A-League.

== Prospective markets, and markets formerly under consideration ==
=== Brisbane ===
Brisbane-based sides Brisbane City and Brisbane Strikers have previously expressed an interest in becoming the second A-League side for the city. An additional side would create a Brisbane Derby against Brisbane Roar.

=== Cairns ===
On 8 March 2014, it was announced that the Cairns-based National Premier Leagues outfit Far North Queensland Heat had signed a sponsorship deal with the Aquis project to support their ambitions of securing an A-League licence. This announcement came just days after the Fung family launched a $269 million takeover bid for the Reef Hotel Casino in the Cairns CBD and revealed their Aquis project—a $4.2 billion development to create a mega-resort at the Yorkeys Knob site. The project included a casino, nine hotels, theatres, a golf course, and a 25,000-seat stadium.

=== Christchurch ===
The president of New Zealand National League side Christchurch United stated in 2023 that he would join a South Island A-League bid.

=== Darwin ===
There is currently no Northern Territory-based team competing in any national competition other than the Australia Cup. In 2008, after successful A-League pre-season games were played in Darwin, the NT Government offered its support for a Darwin-based A-League bid.

=== Geelong ===
With a strong football community in the area, the addition of another Victorian team into the A-League for Geelong has been long supported by key figures and locals alike in the Geelong region.

In March 2008, mounting speculation suggested that a Geelong-based syndicate was working on a proposal for an A-League licence in the competition's next expansion period. Federal Labor MP Darren Cheeseman became one of the main advocates of a Geelong-based side going as far as launching a $20,000 feasibility study to find a location, design, and cost for a new regional football facility in the city. John Mitchell pointed to Newcastle Jets' grand final success in the third season of the A-League, saying Geelong had the capabilities to match its northern counterparts.

In early 2017, the consortium announced it would be entering the race for expansion spots under the working title of Victoria Patriots, with stadium plans in Armstrong Creek. Former Socceroo Steve Horvat acted as the spokesman for the consortium.

=== Gold Coast ===
In November 2015 Gold Coast City was formed to represent the Gold Coast region in the Queensland National Premier League. As a part of the club's creation, general manager Ben Mannion announced the club has intentions to enter the A-League as the second Gold Coast A-League franchise following the failure of the Gold Coast United.

=== Hobart ===
In October 2007, Football Federation Tasmania CEO Martin Shaw suggested that Tasmania would be a viable location for an A-League club, mentioning the fact that it would need support from state and local government. It has been suggested that such a team would play games in both Hobart and Launceston.

=== Perth ===
Football West, the state governing body for football in Western Australia, have expressed interest in securing a second A-League team in Perth, with Football West chairman Liam Twigger believing that a second Perth-based side would boost the footprint of football in WA, increase interest in the A-League and would help double the number of opportunities for players, officials, coaches and fans to engage in the game. Twigger stated that the potential side would go by the working title of the Black Swans – the nickname of the Western Australian State Team that is composed to play an annual friendly against current A-League side Perth Glory. A second A-League franchise in Perth is believed to have to have the capacity to attract considerable support considering the popularity of the sport in Western Australia's capital, as well as many fans' disenchantment following recent administration scandals surrounding the Glory.

=== South East Asia ===
A detailed plan was revealed to have been rejected by former FFA chairman Frank Lowy which would have seen the A-League expand to a 16–20 team league administered in Australia with the additional teams based in South East Asia.

=== Sunshine Coast ===
Sunshine Coast, who currently play in the Queensland State League, have expressed interest in joining the A-League, unveiling a five-year plan in late-2012.

=== Townsville ===
North Queensland Fury was founded in 2008, joining the A-League the same year. However, in 2011, the club was removed from the league due to financial instability. In 2012, a second reincarnation of the club was formed to compete in the NPL Queensland. Fury have been active advocating the FFA for creating a framework for expansion.

== See also ==
- Expansion of the National Rugby League
- Proposed VFL/AFL clubs
