= Wollongong Wolves FC =

Soccer club based in Wollongong, New South Wales

Wollongong Wolves
- Full name: Wollongong Wolves Football Club
- Nickname: The Wolves
- Founded: 1980 (46 years ago)
- Ground: Macedonia Park; Berkeley, New South Wales
- Capacity: 5,000
- Chairman: Tory Lavalle
- Manager: Luke Wilkshire
- League: NPL NSW
- 2026: 11th of 16
- Website: wollongongwolves.com.au
Home colours	Away colours

Wollongong Wolves FC is a men's soccer club based in the suburb of Figtree in Wollongong, New South Wales (NSW). A member-owned club, its senior team plays in the National Premier Leagues NSW (NPL), in the second tier of the Australian league system. It also competes in the Australian Championship as a foundation club. It plays its home games at the Collegians Sports Centre.

Founded as a National Soccer League (NSL) expansion team, the club debuted as Wollongong City, and played 23 seasons in the league from 1981 to 2004, primarily at the purpose-built Brandon Park. It first adopted its current name in 1996, and won two back-to-back NSL championships in the 2000s. Following the NSL's demise, it moved to Football NSW's first division, where it has remained since. In the late 2000s and 2010s, the club underwent tumultuous financial troubles, ownership changes, and rebrandings, though have since stabilised as a fixture of NSW's first division, and were involved in a failed bid for the A-League Men's 2018 expansion.

The Wollongong Wolves' honours include two NSW men's titles and two Waratah Cups. The club also won the 2001 OFC Club Championship, and the NPL's national finals in 2019. Its best finish in the Australia Cup is a round of sixteen appearance in 2021.

== History ==
Chart of yearly table positions for Wollongong Wolves in NSL

=== Foundation ===
The club was founded in 1980 as Wollongong City specifically to compete in the National Soccer League (NSL). The club joined the competition in the 1981 season, to which they finished in 11th position. The club was relegated from the NSL after the 1986 season, as the league reduced in size for the 1987 season. During 1987, Wollongong competed in the NSW First Division, where they were crowned both premiers and champions. The club returned to the NSL in the 1988 season where they were crowned NSL premiers. However, the honour would be he last major title the club would receive for 11 years.

=== Championship years: 1999–2001 ===
In 1996, the club renamed to Wollongong Wolves. In the 1999–2000 season the team finished the league in second position and after winning their semi-final match 2–1 against Carlton, Wolves were matched-up against Perth Glory in the 2000 NSL Grand Final. The grand final match went down as one of the best comebacks ever seen in Australian football. At half time Perth Glory were leading 3–0, but at 56 minutes the Wolves found a goal through Scott Chipperfield to make it 3–1. Matt Horsley gave the Wolves a sniff at a comeback when he put the ball in the back of the net in the 69th minute, but it wasn't until Paul Reid pulled the game right back when his strike in the 89th minute made the score line 3–3. After no goals were scored in extra time, the game was forced into a penalty shoot out. Wolves goalkeeper, Les Pogliacomi, pulled off two saves to win the match 7–6 on penalties and give the club's first nation championship title.

The Wolves followed up their past season win by again placing second in the 2000–01 NSL season. After downing South Melbourne 2–1 in a semi-final match, the Wolves found themselves in a second consecutive NSL Grand Final. The Wolves earned the right to host the grand final for 2001. However, it was decided by Soccer Australia that the final would be moved from Wollongong and instead be played at Parramatta Stadium in Sydney. The reason cited was that the 20,000 capacity at WIN Stadium was not large enough to host such an event. Ironically, the crowd attendance for the match was 13,400. The Wolves went on to claim their second NSL title and qualify for the 2001 Oceania Club Championship, defeating their semi-final opponents, South Melbourne, 2–1. Stuart Young and Sasho Petrovski were among the goal-scorers for the Wolves, scoring on the 56th and 57th minute marks.

In the 2001 Oceania Club Championship, the Wolves beating Tafea of Vanuatu 1–0 in the final. The Oceania Club Championship title, however, did not lead to them playing in the 2001 FIFA Club World Championship which was scheduled to be played in Spain, as FIFA had cancelled the Club World Championship due to financial reasons.

=== Demise of NSL, return to state league ===
Wolves logo (from 2010 to 2015)

After the demise of the national competition, the NSL, the Wolves moved into the NSW Premier League in the 2004–05 season. In 2007, Wollongong Wolves changed its name to Wollongong FC and won the Waratah Cup. The club secured a grand final win in the 2008 season. However, the win didn't prevent a financial crisis later in the year. The club had shown many financial losses including A$240,000 in debts and losses of players and coaches. It was later announced that the club would cease to exist and a new community organisation would be formed to ensure money problems would not plague the club in the future. The club was re-branded as Wollongong Community FC, a not for profit organisation, run and owned by the community.

After a dismal 2009 season, Wollongong Community FC requested a name change back to the former "Wolves" moniker, with the formal request being approved in November 2009, and the name South Coast Wolves adopted in 2010.

The Wolves competed in the inaugural 2014 FFA Cup, where they were eliminated from the round of 32 by Central Coast Mariners 1–0 in front of a crowd of 5,238 at WIN Stadium.

In July 2015, as part of the club's 35th anniversary celebrations, it was announced that along with a brand new club logo, the name of the club would also change from South Coast Wolves back to Wollongong Wolves. These changes will be brought in for the 2016 season onwards.

Wollongong qualified for the 2016 FFA Cup and drew A-League powerhouse Sydney FC in the Round of 32. The match, played on 10 August 2016 at WIN Stadium in front of 8,029 fans, saw the Sky Blues run out 3–0 victors, with two goals to Matt Simon and one to David Carney.

=== Australian Championship (2025–) ===
On 20 November 2023, Football Australia announced that the Wolves would officially become a foundation member of the Australian Championship in 2025. Due to the structure of the league, the Wolves will continue to participate in the NPL NSW competition as well as the new national second division. It was announced that the club would be playing its home matches at Collegians Sports Centre for the competition as WIN Stadium was not financially viable.

Wollongong signed decorated Japanese midfieleder, Kazuya Yamamura from Yokohama F. Marinos on 2 September 2025 for the championship. The club also signed Tate Russell from Western United as the club was required to release its players following their expulsion of the A-League.

The Wolves first match of the new national competition began on 12 October 2025, away to South Hobart FC at Darcy Street Oval. Wollongong won the match 3–1, with winger Alex Masciovecchio receiving the honour of the club's first goalscorer in the new championship. New recruit Kazuya Yamamura scored a "worldie" from close to halfway to break the 1–1 deadlock in the second half. Returning striker Thomas James sealed the three points with a goal in injury time from a Nicholas Olsen cross.

== Colours, kit and emblem ==
Wolves emblem in the 1990s

Like many other teams from the Illawarra region, the Wolves have traditionally played in red and white. These colours are taken from the local floral emblem – the Illawarra Flametree – which is used by representative teams and sporting associations throughout the area. Variations of these colours have been used throughout the years. For the 1996–97 season, the first season with the official Wolves moniker, the club played in a predominantly red kit. The shirt was bright red with maroon paneling on the lower torso and collar. Both shorts and socks were also bright red. For the 2000–01 championship season the club had returned to bright red shirt with a white collar and black detailing on the shoulders. The shorts and socks were both white. In 2002–03 the club changed to black collar, shorts and socks, and the shirt bright red with white paneling down the sides. Generally the away kits have been all-white throughout much of the Wolves history. After the club's financial troubles of the 2009 season and the move to the new moniker South Coast Wolves, both the home and away kit evolved also. The club's home kit was an all-white shirt, red shorts and socks. The away kit was a yellow with blue collar and side paneling, blue shorts and socks. For the 2014 FFA Cup, the club played in an all-red kit with white detailing. As of the 2015 season the club are back playing in a red shirt, black shorts and white socks. The away kit is also predominantly all-white with black socks.

The club's emblem has evolved throughout the years also. The original crest featured a wolf facing forward standing on its forefeet with a football in front. "Wollongong Wolves" was titled in white against a red background above the wolf. From 1996 the emblem included only the head of a wolf looking head-on, framed with large text of "Wolves" with smaller text "Wollongong" above it. Above this sat a football. With the name change to South Coast Wolves, the wolf also changed orientation to face east. There was no framing, just text "South Coast" above and "Wolves" underneath the wolf. During 2013, a company set out to produce a new club crest, citing the crest lacked traditional themes present in clubs such as Manchester United, Inter Milan and Bayern Munich. They produced a simple logo of a wolf looking face on and created a simple crest to frame the wolf. The club announced it would adopt this design from the 2016 season with the addition of two gold stars and two silver stars to represent the national and state championships won.

The Wolves kits are currently manufactured by Puma and the kit main sponsor is MCR Multi Civil and Rail. The back of the kit sponsor for season 2018 is Central Data Networks (CDN).

== Stadium ==
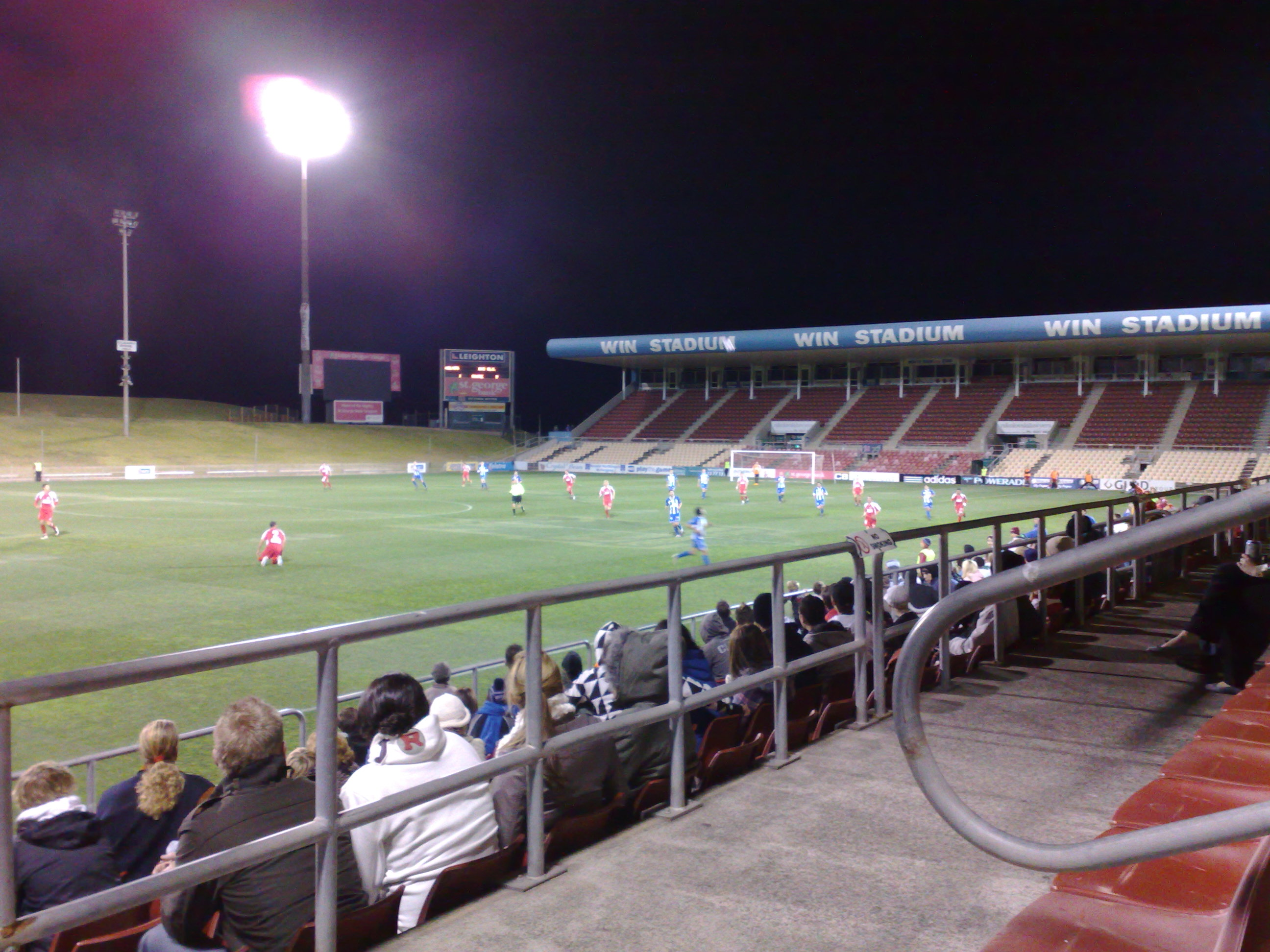
WIN Stadium

When Wollongong City was admitted into the NSL in 1981, the club played out of the Wollongong Showground and then in Corrimal before it made a home at Brandon Park, Fairy Meadow in 1988. The ground had a capacity of 15,000. However, this site was demolished in 2003 in order for the University of Wollongong to build their new Wollongong Innovation Campus. At the time, the Wolves had six years left on their lease to the ground, but had been promised to play out of WIN Stadium as co-tenants with NRL team, the St. George-Illawarra Dragons. The switch to WIN Stadium occurred in 2000 following the club's title-winning season. However, due to the demise of the NSL and the Lysaghts Oval fiasco followed by the former owners handing the club to the football community has left the Wolves homeless. The Wolves moved through various homegrounds, including Macedonia Park (Berkeley) and Wetherall Park (Primbee) before settling on John Crehan Park in Cringila as its base, which has a capacity of 7,500. The Wolves moved back to WIN Stadium on a part-time contract in 2014 before announcing a permanent move in the PS4 National Premier League NSW Men's 1 for the 2015 season. The club also announced it would move their training facilities to The Thomas Dalton Park Regional Sports Centre in Fairy Meadow.

== Players ==
=== Current squad ===
As of 17 September 2026

Note: Flags indicate national team as defined under FIFA eligibility rules; some limited exceptions apply. Players may hold more than one non-FIFA nationality.

No.	Pos.	Nation	Player
1	GK	AUS	Daniel Solsky
2	DF	JPN	Kazuya Yamamura
3	DF	AUS	Jude Christie
4	DF	AUS	Dylan Ryan
5	DF	JPN	Banri Kanaizumi
7	MF	AUS	Felipe D’Agostini
8	MF	AUS	Sebastian Duarte
9	FW	AUS	Ryan Lowe
10	MF	AUS	Flynn Madden
11	MF	AUS	Sebastian Hernandez
15	MF	AUS	James Anagnostopoulos

No.	Pos.	Nation	Player
16	FW	AUS	Lucas Trajcevski
17	DF	AUS	Marcus Beattie
18	DF	AUS	Max Linton
19	GK	AUS	Max Cunial
21	MF	AUS	Liam Ball
24	FW	AUS	Lachlan Scott
25	FW	AUS	Alex Masciovecchio
44	MF	AUS	Taj Demito
77	DF	AUS	Dylan King
—	DF	AUS	Zac De Jesus (on loan from Sydney FC)

== Club officials ==
=== Coaching staff ===
Position	Name
Head coach	(Australia) Luke Wilkshire
Assistant coach	(Australia) Julio Miranda
Assistant coach	(Japan) Yuzo Tashiro
Senior Managers	(Australia) Mark Wilkshire (Russia) Egor Dolgopolov
Goalkeeping coach	(Australia) John Krajnovic
Physiotherapist	Matt Whalan

=== Committee members ===
Below is the list of the club's committee members.

Position	Name
Chairman	Tory Lavalle
Director	Chris Halios-Lewis
Football Operations and Administration Manager	Susan Gatt
SAP Technical Director	Jacob Timpano
Board Members	Luke Wilkshire
Board Members	Laura Davis
Board Members	Courtney Rawson

== Honours ==
=== Regional ===
- National Premier Leagues NSW
  - Champions (2): 1987, 2008
  - Premiers (2): 1987, 2019
- Waratah Cup
  - Champions (2): 1997, 2007

=== National ===
- National Soccer League
  - Champions (2): 1999–2000, 2000–01
  - Premiers (1): 1988
- National Premier Leagues
  - Champions (1): 2019

=== Continental ===
- OFC Champions League
  - Champions (1): 2001

== International record ==
Season	Competition	Round	Club	Home	Away	Aggregate
2001	OFC Club Championship	Group A	(Tonga) Lotohaʻapai	16–0		1st out of 6
2001	OFC Club Championship	Group A	(Fiji) Foodtown Warriors	5–0		1st out of 6
2001	OFC Club Championship	Group A	(Solomon Islands) Laugu United	10–0		1st out of 6
2001	OFC Club Championship	Group A	(Papua New Guinea) Unitech	6–0		1st out of 6
2001	OFC Club Championship	Group A	(New Zealand) Napier City Rovers	1–0		1st out of 6
2001	OFC Club Championship	Semi-final	(French Polynesia) AS Vénus	4–2		
2001	OFC Club Championship	Final	(Vanuatu) Tafea	1–0		
2001	FIFA Club World Championship	Group A	(Egypt) Zamalek SC	cancelled		cancelled
2001	FIFA Club World Championship	Group A	(Spain) Deportivo de La Coruña	cancelled		cancelled
2001	FIFA Club World Championship	Group A	(Argentina) Boca Juniors	cancelled		cancelled

== See also ==
- List of Wollongong Wolves FC seasons
- South Coast A-League Bid
