= 2017–18 in Australian soccer =

49th season of national competitive soccer in Australia

Soccer in Australia
- Season: 2017–18

Men's soccer
- A-League Premiership: Sydney FC
- A-League Championship: Melbourne Victory
- National Premier Leagues: Heidelberg United
- FFA Cup: Sydney FC

Women's soccer
- W-League Premiership: Brisbane Roar
- W-League Championship: Melbourne City

The 2017–18 season was the 49th season of national competitive soccer in Australia and 135rd overall.

== Domestic leagues ==
=== A-League ===
==== Regular season ====
Pos	Team	Pld	W	D	L	GF	GA	GD	Pts	Qualification
1	Sydney FC	27	20	4	3	64	22	+42	64	Qualification for 2019 AFC Champions League group stage and Finals series
2	Newcastle Jets	27	15	5	7	57	37	+20	50	Qualification for 2019 AFC Champions League second preliminary round and Finals series
3	Melbourne City	27	13	4	10	41	33	+8	43	Qualification for Finals series
4	Melbourne Victory (C)	27	12	5	10	43	37	+6	41	Qualification for 2019 AFC Champions League group stage and Finals series
5	Adelaide United	27	11	6	10	36	38	−2	39	Qualification for Finals series
6	Brisbane Roar	27	10	5	12	33	40	−7	35	Qualification for Finals series
7	Western Sydney Wanderers	27	8	9	10	38	47	−9	33	
8	Perth Glory	27	10	2	15	37	50	−13	32	
9	Wellington Phoenix (Note: Wellington Phoenix cannot qualify for the AFC Champions League as they are not recognised as an AFC club.)	27	5	6	16	31	55	−24	21	
10	Central Coast Mariners	27	4	8	15	28	49	−21	20	

Source: A-Leagues
Rules for classification: 1) points; 2) goal difference; 3) number of goals scored.
(C) Champions

==== Finals series ====
Elimination-finals
Melbourne Victory	2
Adelaide United	1
Melbourne City	2
Brisbane Roar	0

Semi-finals
Sydney FC	2
Melbourne Victory (a.e.t.)	3
Newcastle Jets	2
Melbourne City	1

Grand Final
Newcastle Jets	0
Melbourne Victory	1

=== National Premier Leagues ===
The finals series featured the winner of each Member Federation's league competition in the National Premier Leagues, with the overall winner qualifying directly for the 2018 FFA Cup Round of 32.

Quarter-finals; 16–17 September
(Australian Capital Territory) Canberra Olympic	1
(New South Wales) Edgeworth Eagles	4
(Tasmania) South Hobart	2
(Queensland) Brisbane Strikers	4
(Western Australia) Bayswater City	1
(Victoria (state)) Heidelberg United (a.e.t.)	3
(South Australia) Adelaide City	0
(New South Wales) APIA Leichhardt Tigers	1

Semi-finals; 23 September
(New South Wales) Edgeworth Eagles	0
(Queensland) Brisbane Strikers	2
(Victoria (state)) Heidelberg United	2
(New South Wales) APIA Leichhardt Tigers	1

Grand final 30 September
(Queensland) Brisbane Strikers	0
(Victoria (state)) Heidelberg United	2

=== W-League ===
==== Regular season ====
Pos	Team	Pld	W	D	L	GF	GA	GD	Pts	Qualification
1	Brisbane Roar	12	9	1	2	21	12	+9	28	Qualification to Finals series
2	Sydney FC	12	8	1	3	26	16	+10	25	Qualification to Finals series
3	Newcastle Jets	12	6	2	4	26	21	+5	20	Qualification to Finals series
4	Melbourne City (C)	12	6	2	4	20	15	+5	20	Qualification to Finals series
5	Canberra United	12	5	1	6	24	27	−3	16	
6	Perth Glory	12	4	2	6	25	27	−2	14	
7	Melbourne Victory	12	3	2	7	15	19	−4	11	
8	Western Sydney Wanderers	12	3	2	7	13	21	−8	11	
9	Adelaide United	12	3	1	8	15	27	−12	10	

Source: A-Leagues
Rules for classification: 1) points; 2) goal difference; 3) number of goals scored.
(C) Champions

Semi-finals
2	Sydney FC (a.e.t.)	3
3	Newcastle Jets	2
1	Brisbane Roar	0
4	Melbourne City	2

Grand Final
Sydney FC	0
Melbourne City	2

== Domestic cups ==
=== FFA Cup ===
Round of 32
Moreton Bay United (a.e.t.)	4
Broadmeadow Magic	2
Gold Coast City	3
Western Knights	1
South Melbourne	1
Edgeworth FC	0
Sorrento FC	1
Canberra Olympic	0
Bankstown Berries	2
North Eastern MetroStars	1
Darwin Rovers	0
Sydney FC	8
Hills Brumbies	3
Hakoah Sydney City East (a.e.t.)	6
Peninsula Power	0
Melbourne City	2
Blacktown City	3
Central Coast Mariners	2
Olympia	0
APIA Leichhardt Tigers	5
Hume City	1 (1)
Bentleigh Greens (p)	1 (4)
Western Sydney Wanderers (a.e.t.)	1
Wellington Phoenix	0
Sydney United 58	7
Far North Queensland	2
Heidelberg United	1
Perth Glory	0
Adelaide United	1
Newcastle Jets	0
Brisbane Roar	1
Melbourne Victory	5

Round of 16
Moreton Bay United	0
Gold Coast City (a.e.t.)	1
South Melbourne	4
Sorrento FC	1
Bankstown Berries	0
Sydney FC	3
Hakoah Sydney City East	2
Melbourne City	3
Blacktown City	3
APIA Leichhardt Tigers	1
Bentleigh Greens	0
Western Sydney Wanderers	4
Sydney United 58	1 (3)
Heidelberg United (p)	1 (4)
Adelaide United	3
Melbourne Victory	0

Quarter-finals
Gold Coast City	0
South Melbourne	6
Sydney FC	2
Melbourne City	0
Blacktown City	2 (2)
Western Sydney Wanderers (p)	2 (4)
Heidelberg United	0
Adelaide United	3

Semi-finals
South Melbourne	1
Sydney FC	5
Western Sydney Wanderers	1
Adelaide United	2

Final
Sydney FC (a.e.t.)	2
Adelaide United	1

== International club competitions ==
=== AFC Champions League ===
==== Group stage ====
===== Group F =====
Pos	Team	Pld	W	D	L	GF	GA	GD	Pts	Qualification	SSI	ULS	MEL	KAW
1	(China) Shanghai SIPG	6	3	2	1	10	6	+4	11	Advance to knockout stage	—	2–2	4–1	1–1
2	(South Korea) Ulsan Hyundai	6	2	3	1	15	11	+4	9	Advance to knockout stage	0–1	—	6–2	2–1
3	(Australia) Melbourne Victory	6	2	2	2	11	16	−5	8		2–1	3–3	—	1–0
4	(Japan) Kawasaki Frontale	6	0	3	3	6	9	−3	3		0–1	2–2	2–2	—

Source: AFC

===== Group H =====
Pos	Team	Pld	W	D	L	GF	GA	GD	Pts	Qualification	SSB	KAS	SYD	SSH
1	(South Korea) Suwon Samsung Bluewings	6	3	1	2	8	7	+1	10	Advance to knockout stage	—	1–2	1–4	1–1
2	(Japan) Kashima Antlers	6	2	3	1	8	6	+2	9	Advance to knockout stage	0–1	—	1–1	1–1
3	(Australia) Sydney FC	6	1	3	2	7	8	−1	6		0–2	0–2	—	0–0
4	(China) Shanghai Shenhua	6	0	5	1	6	8	−2	5		0–2	2–2	2–2	—

Source: AFC

== National teams ==
=== Men's senior ===
==== Friendlies ====
The following is a list of friendlies played by the men's senior national team in 2017–18.

23 March 2018	Norway	4–1	Australia	Oslo, Norway
18:00 CET (UTC+1)	Kamara 36', 57', 90+1'; Reginiussen 48'	Report	Irvine 19'	Stadium: Ullevaal Stadion; Referee: Andreas Ekberg (Sweden)

27 March 2018	Colombia	0–0	Australia	London, England
20:00 GMT		Report		Stadium: Craven Cottage; Referee: Robert Madley (England)

1 June 2018	Australia	4–0	Czech Republic	St. Pölten, Austria
13:00 CEST (UTC+2)	Leckie 32', 72'; Nabbout 54'; Jugas 80' (o.g.)	Report		Stadium: NV Arena; Referee: Alexander Harkam (Austria)

9 June 2018	Hungary	1–2	Australia	Budapest, Hungary
17:30 CEST (UTC+2)	Sainsbury 88' (o.g.)	Report	Arzani 74'; Kádár 90+2' (o.g.)	Stadium: Groupama Arena; Referee: Matej Jug (Slovenia)

==== FIFA World Cup qualification ====
31 August 2017 Group B	Japan	2–0	Australia	Saitama, Japan
19:35 UTC+9	Asano 41'; Ideguchi 82'	Report; Report (FIFA); Report (AFC)		Stadium: Saitama Stadium 2002; Attendance: 59,492; Referee: Alireza Faghani (Iran)

5 September 2017 Group B	Australia	2–1	Thailand	Melbourne, Australia
20:00 UTC+10	Juric 69'; Leckie 86'	Report; Report (FIFA); Report (AFC)	Pokklaw 82'	Stadium: Melbourne Rectangular Stadium; Attendance: 26,393; Referee: Liu Kwok Man (Hong Kong)

5 October 2017 Round 4	Syria	1–1	Australia	Malacca, Malaysia
20:30 UTC+8	Al Somah 85' (pen.)	Report; Report (FIFA); Report (AFC)	Kruse 40'	Stadium: Hang Jebat Stadium; Attendance: 2,150; Referee: Alireza Faghani (Iran)

10 October 2017 Round 4	Australia	2–1 (a.e.t.) (3–2 agg.)	Syria	Sydney, Australia
20:00 UTC+11	Cahill 13', 109'	Report; Report (FIFA); Report (AFC)	Al Somah 6'	Stadium: Stadium Australia; Attendance: 42,136; Referee: Ravshan Irmatov (Uzbekistan)

10 November 2017 IC Playoff	Honduras	0–0	Australia	San Pedro Sula, Honduras
16:00 UTC−6		Report; Report (FIFA)		Stadium: Estadio Olímpico Metropolitano; Attendance: 38,000; Referee: Daniele Orsato (Italy)

15 November 2017 IC Playoff	Australia	3–1 (3–1 agg.)	Honduras	Sydney, Australia
20:00 UTC+11	Jedinak 54', 72' (pen.), 86' (pen.)	Report; Report (FIFA)	M. Figueroa 90+3'	Stadium: Stadium Australia; Attendance: 77,060; Referee: Néstor Pitana (Argentina)

==== FIFA World Cup ====
Australia qualified for the 2018 FIFA World Cup, their fourth successive FIFA World Cup after defeating Honduras in a two-legged playoff in November 2017. They were the thirty-first team to qualify. The draw took place in Moscow on 1 December 2017, with Australia drawn in Group C alongside France, Peru, and Denmark.

16 June 2018 Group stage	France	2–1	Australia	Kazan, Russia
13:00 UTC+3	Griezmann 58' (pen.); Behich 81' (o.g.)	Report (FFA); Report (FIFA)	Jedinak 62' (pen.)	Stadium: Kazan Arena; Attendance: 41,279; Referee: Andrés Cunha (Uruguay)

21 June 2018 Group stage	Denmark	1–1	Australia	Samara, Russia
16:00 UTC+4	Eriksen 7'	Report (FFA); Report (FIFA)	Jedinak 38' (pen.)	Stadium: Cosmos Arena; Attendance: 40,727; Referee: Antonio Mateu Lahoz (Spain)

26 June 2018 Group stage	Australia	0–2	Peru	Sochi, Russia
17:00 UTC+3		Report (FFA); Report (FIFA)	Carrillo 18'; Guerrero 50'	Stadium: Fisht Olympic Stadium; Attendance: 44,073; Referee: Sergei Karasev (Russia)

=== Men's under-23 ===
==== Friendlies ====
The following is a list of friendlies played by the Men's under 23 national team in 2017–18.

6 January 2018	Australia	2–1	Thailand	Shanghai, China
	Cowburn 8'; Mauk 52'	Report	Worachit 70'

==== AFC U-23 Championship qualification ====
19 July 2017 Group F	Australia	2–0	Brunei	Yangon, Myanmar
15:00 MMT	Blackwood 53'; McGree 85'	Report		Stadium: Thuwunna Stadium; Attendance: 3,000; Referee: Yudai Yamamoto (Japan)

21 July 2017 Group F	Singapore	0–7	Australia	Yangon, Myanmar
15:00 MMT		Report	Mauk 8'; Blackwood 13', 18'; Popovic 39', 60'; Clut 68'; Sotirio 73'	Stadium: Thuwunna Stadium; Attendance: 750; Referee: Ammar Mahfoodh (Bahrain)

23 July 2017 Group F	Myanmar	0–3	Australia	Yangon, Myanmar
18:00 MMT		Report	Kamau 6'; Aspropotamitis 32'; Sotirio 58'	Stadium: Thuwunna Stadium; Attendance: 30,000; Referee: Ammar Mahfoodh (Bahrain)

==== AFC U-23 Championship ====
11 January 2018 Group stage	Australia	3–1	Syria	Kunshan, China
16:00 CST	Blackwood 8', 77'; Kamau 43'	Report	Deng 53' (o.g.)	Stadium: Kunshan Stadium; Referee: Khamis Al-Marri (Qatar)

14 January 2018 Group stage	Vietnam	1–0	Australia	Kunshan, China
16:00 CST	Hải 72'	Report		Stadium: Kunshan Stadium; Attendance: 2,362; Referee: Mohanad Qasim Eesee Sarray (Iraq)

17 January 2018 Group stage	South Korea	3–2	Australia	Kunshan, China
19:30 CST	K.H. Lee 18', 65'; Han 44'	Report	Cowburn 72'; Buhagiar 76'	Stadium: Kunshan Stadium; Attendance: 678; Referee: Abdulrahman Al-Jassim (Qatar)

=== Men's under-20 ===
==== Friendlies ====
The following is a list of friendlies played by the men's under 20 national team in 2017–18.

2 August 2017 WA Training Camp	Western Australia	0–3	Australia	Perth, Australia
19:00 AWST		Report	Najjar 67'; Sette 76'; Puflett 90+1'	Stadium: Perth Plasterboard Centre Stadium; Referee: Steve Gregory (Australia)

4 August 2017 WA Training Camp	Australia	4–0	Singapore	Perth, Australia
19:00 AWST	Tokich 40'; Najjar 56', 58'; Theoharous 81' (pen.)	Report		Stadium: Hartfield Park; Attendance: ~1,000; Referee: Adam Fielding (Australia)

23 September 2017 Four Nation Tournament	Qatar	2–0	Australia	Doha, Qatar
		Report		Stadium: Aspire Academy

25 September 2017 Four Nation Tournament	Croatia	2–0	Australia	Doha, Qatar
		Report		Stadium: Aspire Academy

27 September 2017 Four Nation Tournament	Japan	3–3 (9–8 p)	Australia	Doha, Qatar
	Hori 4'; Ando 43'; Ito 73'	Report	15'; 16'; 63'	Stadium: Aspire Academy

30 September 2017 Four Nation Tournament; Playoff for 3rd	Japan	2–1	Australia	Doha, Qatar
	Goke 61', 78'	Report	8'	Stadium: Aspire Academy

==== AFC U-19 Championship qualification ====
4 November 2017	Hong Kong	0–3	Australia	Hanoi, Vietnam
18:00 ICT		Report	Najjarine 11'; Najjar 80' (pen.), 85' (pen.)	Stadium: National YFT Center; Attendance: 185; Referee: Takuto Okabe (Japan)

8 November 2017	Australia	4–1	North Korea	Hanoi, Vietnam
18:00 ICT	Monge 19'; Najjar 26'; Najjarine 48'; Genreau 90+1'	Report	H. H. Kim 67'	Stadium: National YFT Center; Attendance: 230; Referee: Saoud Al-Athbah (Qatar)

=== Men's under-17 ===
==== AFF U-15 Championship ====
9 July 2017 Group stage	Thailand	2–1	Australia	Chonburi, Thailand
17:00 ICT	Suphanat 28'; Simmons 73' (o.g.)	Report	Ostler 23'	Stadium: IPE Chonburi Stadium; Attendance: 800; Referee: Mohammad Zamzaidi Katimin (Malaysia)

11 July 2017 Group stage	Singapore	0–8	Australia	Chonburi, Thailand
19:30 ICT		Report	Warland 6'; Kirdar 7'; Kucharski 17'; Antonis 31'; Darjani 40', 49'; Main 71'; Varga 75'	Stadium: IPE Chonburi Stadium; Attendance: 120; Referee: Chi Samdy (Cambodia)

13 July 2017 Group stage	Australia	7–3	Indonesia	Chonburi, Thailand
19:30 ICT	Ostler 9'; Botic 11', 30'; Sepping 14'; Kirdar 35'; Teague 55'; De Robillard 65'	Report	Kahfi 3', 7', 62'	Stadium: IPE Chonburi Stadium; Attendance: 150; Referee: Ngo Duy Lan (Vietnam)

15 July 2017 Group stage	Myanmar	0–5	Australia	Chonburi, Thailand
19:30 ICT		Report	Broyce 18'; Varga 48'; Sepping 50'; Duzel 55'; Botic 70'	Stadium: IPE Chonburi Stadium; Attendance: 250; Referee: Hoang Ngoc Ha (Vietnam)

17 July 2017 Group stage	Australia	3–1	Laos	Chonburi, Thailand
17:00 ICT	Kucharski 26'; Stellitano 52', 59'	Report	Chony 40'	Stadium: IPE Chonburi Stadium; Referee: Mohammad Zamzaidi Katimin (Malaysia)

20 July 2017 Semi-final	Vietnam	2–0	Australia	Chonburi, Thailand
18:30 ICT	Quốc Hoàng 29'; Nguyên Hoàng 32'	Report		Stadium: Chonburi Stadium; Attendance: 250; Referee: Xaypasert Phongsanit (Laos)

22 July 2017 Third place	Malaysia	2–3	Australia	Chonburi, Thailand
16:00 ICT	Azzim 7'; Danial 80'	Report	Kucharski 16'; Antonis 38'; Kirdar 76'	Stadium: Chonburi Stadium; Attendance: 250; Referee: Warintorn Sassadee (Thailand)

==== AFC U-16 Championship qualification ====
20 September 2017 Qualification Group I	Mongolia	1–10	Australia	Ulaanbaatar, Mongolia
16:00 (UTC+8)	Erdene-ochir 33'	Report	Savas 8', 27', 34', 42', 50'; Hammond 30'; Peupion 66'; Botic 67'; Kucharski 79'; Kirdar 83'	Stadium: MFF Football Centre; Attendance: 465; Referee: Hasan Akrami (Iran)

22 September 2017 Qualification Group I	Cambodia	0–5	Australia	Ulaanbaatar, Mongolia
12:00 (UTC+8)		Report	Kirdar 73' (pen.), 90'; Savas 83'; Botic 86' (pen.); Peupion 90+3'	Stadium: MFF Football Centre; Attendance: 46; Referee: Pranjal Banerjee (India)

24 September 2017 Qualification Group I	Vietnam	1–3	Australia	Ulaanbaatar, Mongolia
12:00 (UTC+8)	Thành 80'	Report	Savas 63'; Teague 72'; Hammond 79' (pen.)	Stadium: MFF Football Centre; Attendance: 182; Referee: Hasan Akrami (Iran)

=== Women's senior ===
==== Friendlies ====
The following is a list of friendlies played by the women's senior national team in 2017–18.

16 September 2017	Australia	2–1	Brazil	Sydney, Australia
15:00 (AEST)	De Vanna 41'; Kerr 67'	Report	Debinha 79'	Stadium: Pepper Stadium; Attendance: 15,089; Referee: Anna-Marie Keighley (New Zealand)

19 September 2017	Australia	3–2	Brazil	Newcastle, Australia
19:30 (AEST)	Kerr 37', 65'; Foord 46'	Report	Fabiana 1'; Marta 86' (pen.)	Stadium: McDonald Jones Stadium; Attendance: 16,829; Referee: Lara Lee (Australia)

22 November 2017	Australia	3–0	China	Melbourne, Australia
19:30 (AEDT)	Kerr 23', 64'; Butt 53'	Report		Stadium: AAMI Park; Attendance: 10,904; Referee: Esther Staubli (Switzerland)

26 November 2017	Australia	5–1	China	Geelong, Australia
16:30 (AEDT)	Simon 14'; Li 25' (o.g.); Kerr 37', 58'; Logarzo 68'	Report	Ren 7'	Stadium: GMHBA Stadium; Attendance: 6,338; Referee: Sandra Strub (Switzerland)

26 March 2018	Australia	5–0	Thailand	Perth, Australia
18:00 AWST	Chidiac 6'; De Vanna 42', 52'; Logarzo 44'; Crummer 75'	Report		Stadium: nib Stadium

==== Tournament of Nations ====
27 July 2017	United States	0–1	Australia	Seattle, United States
19:00 (PDT)		Report	Butt 67'	Stadium: CenturyLink Field; Attendance: 15,748; Referee: Marie-Soleil Beaudoin (Canada)

30 July 2017	Japan	2–4	Australia	San Diego, United States
14:15 (PDT)	Tanaka 5'; Momiki 90+2'	Report	Kerr 10', 14', 43'; van Egmond 62' (pen.)	Stadium: Qualcomm Stadium; Attendance: 9,597; Referee: Katja Koroleva (United States)

3 August 2017	Australia	6–1	Brazil	Carson, United States
16:15 (PDT)	De Vanna 7', 34'; Foord 32', 68'; Gorry 41'; Kerr 81'	Report	Camila 2'	Stadium: StubHub Center; Attendance: 11,948; Referee: Christina Unkel (United States)

==== Algarve Cup ====
28 February 2018 Group stage	Australia	4–3	Norway	Albufeira, Portugal
18:30 WET	Polkinghorne 13'; Logarzo 24'; Kerr 31'; Crummer 90+5'	Report	Thorsnes 11', 61' (pen.); Ultand 52'	Stadium: Albufeira Municipal Stadium; Referee: Monika Mularczyk (Poland)

2 March 2018 Group stage	Portugal	0–0	Australia	Algarve, Portugal
15:00 WET		Report		Stadium: Estádio Algarve; Referee: Jonesia Kabakama (Tanzania)

5 March 2018 Group stage	Australia	2–0	China	Albufeira, Portugal
19:00 WET	Logarzo 51'; Kerr 90+2'	Report		Stadium: Albufeira Municipal Stadium; Referee: Laura Fortunato (Argentina)

7 March 2018 3rd place match	Australia	1–2	Portugal	Albufeira, Portugal
15:00 WET	Cooper 45+2'	Report	Gomes 38'; Malho 56'	Stadium: Albufeira Municipal Stadium; Referee: Ekaterina Koroleva (United States)

==== AFC Women's Asian Cup ====
7 April 2018 Group stage	Australia	0–0	South Korea	Amman, Jordan
20:00 (EEST)		Report; Report (AFC)		Stadium: King Abdullah II Stadium; Attendance: 230; Referee: Qin Liang (China)

10 April 2018 Group stage	Vietnam	0–8	Australia	Amman, Jordan
20:00 (EEST)		Report; Report (AFC)	Simon 8'; Kennedy 18'; Logarzo 21'; van Egmond 28'; Kerr 44', 51'; Tuyết Dung 71' (o.g.); Raso 75'	Stadium: Amman International Stadium; Attendance: 401; Referee: Edita Mirabidova (Uzbekistan)

13 April 2018 Group stage	Japan	1–1	Australia	Amman, Jordan
16:45 (EEST)	Sakaguchi 63'	Report; Report (AFC)	Kerr 86'	Stadium: Amman International Stadium; Referee: Ri Hyang-ok (North Korea)

17 April 2018 Semi-final	Australia	2–2 (a.e.t.) (3–1 p)	Thailand	Amman, Jordan
16:45 (EEST)	Kanjanaporn 17' (o.g.); Kennedy 90+1'	Report; Report (AFC)	Kanjana 20'; Rattikan 63'	Stadium: King Abdullah II Stadium; Attendance: 166; Referee: Edita Mirabidova (Uzbekistan)
	Penalties
	van Egmond (penalty missed); Kellond-Knight (penalty scored); De Vanna (penalty missed); Catley (penalty scored); Kerr (penalty scored)		(penalty scored) Ainon; (penalty missed) Sunisa; (penalty missed) Silawan; (penalty missed) Pitsamai

20 April 2018 Final	Japan	1–0	Australia	Amman, Jordan
18:00 (EEST)	Yokoyama 84'	Report; Report (AFC)		Stadium: Amman International Stadium; Attendance: 3,065; Referee: Ri Hyang-ok (North Korea)

=== Women's under-20 ===
==== Friendlies ====
The following is a list of friendlies played by the women's under 20 national team in 2017–18.

8 July 2017	Australia	1–0	Canada	Canberra, Australia
10:00 AEST	Chidiac 53'	Report		Stadium: Australian Institute of Sport; Referee: Lara Lee (Australia)

10 July 2017	Australia	1–2	United States	Canberra, Australia
15:30 AEST	Lowe 39'	Report	Spaanstra 73'; Jones 87'	Stadium: Australian Institute of Sport; Referee: Kate Jacewicz (Australia)

12 July 2017	Australia	1–4	United States	Canberra, Australia
15:30 AEST	Maher 49'	Report	Ekic 52'; Yates 58', 72', 89'	Stadium: Australian Institute of Sport

16 March 2018	Australia	2–1	Thailand	Sydney, Australia
12:30 AEDT	Lowe 56'; Sayer 77'	Report	Nutwadee 80'	Stadium: Leichhardt Oval; Attendance: 1,335

==== 2017 AFC U-19 Women's Championship ====
16 October 2017 Group stage	South Korea	0–2	Australia	Nanjing, China
15:00 CST		Report	Siemsen 70'; Ibini 90+3'	Stadium: Jiangsu Training Base Stadium; Attendance: 150; Referee: Qin Liang (China)

19 October 2017 Group stage	Australia	1–5	Japan	Nanjing, China
19:00 CST	Siemsen 13'	Report	Miyagawa 51'; Hayashi 58'; Miyazawa 66'; Takarada 72', 90+3'	Stadium: Jiangning Sports Center; Attendance: 561; Referee: Ri Hyang-ok (North Korea)

22 October 2017 Group stage	Australia	5–2	Vietnam	Nanjing, China
15:00 CST	Siemsen 5'; Lowe 13'; Chidiac 28', 69', 72'	Report	Tuyết Ngân 50'; Nhai 81'	Stadium: Jiangsu Training Base Stadium; Attendance: 130; Referee: Thein Thein Aye (Myanmar)

25 October 2017 Semi-final	North Korea	3–0	Australia	Nanjing, China
15:00 CST	P. U. Kim 9' (pen.); Sung 28', 65'	Report		Stadium: Jiangning Sports Center; Attendance: 261; Referee: Thein Thein Aye (Myanmar)

28 October 2017 3rd place match	Australia	0–3	China	Nanjing, China
15:00 CST		Report	L. He 20'; Xie 53'; Jin 54'	Stadium: Jiangning Sports Center; Attendance: 843; Referee: Ri Hyang-ok (North Korea)

=== Women's under-17 ===
==== 2017 AFC U-16 Women's Championship ====
11 September 2017 Group stage	Japan	5–0	Australia	Chonburi, Thailand
19:00 ICT	Osawa 5'; Tomioka 48'; Tanaka 54', 71'; Kinoshita 84'	Report		Stadium: IPE Chonburi Stadium; Attendance: 152; Referee: Oh Hyeon-jeong (South Korea)

14 September 2017 Group stage	Australia	0–7	North Korea	Chonburi, Thailand
19:00 ICT		Report	K. Y. Kim 5', 39'; H. G. Pak 21'; Ko 78'; S. G. Ri 86', 90+2'; J. H. Yun 88'	Stadium: Chonburi Stadium; Attendance: 75; Referee: Cong Thi Dung (Vietnam)

17 September 2017 Group stage	Australia	3–2	Bangladesh	Chonburi, Thailand
18:00 ICT	Hughes 9'; Cooney-Cross 78'; Sakalis 83'	Report	Shamsunnahar 45' (pen.); Monika 51'	Stadium: IPE Chonburi Stadium; Attendance: 157; Referee: Oh Hyeon-jeong (South Korea)

== Deaths ==
- 2 July 2017: Billy Cook, 77, Australia and Slavia defender.
- 31 July 2017: Les Murray, 71, commentator and journalist.
- 31 August 2017: Mike Cockerill, 56, commentator and journalist.
- 11 October 2017: Pat Hughes, 78, Australia and APIA midfielder.
- 17 November 2017: Commins Menapi, 40, Solomon Islands and Sydney United forward.
- 9 February 2018: Liam Miller, 36, Republic of Ireland, Perth Glory, Brisbane Roar and Melbourne City midfielder.
- 7 June 2018: Cliff van Blerk, 79, Australia and APIA midfielder.

== Retirements ==
- 24 July 2017: Thomas Sørensen, former Denmark and Melbourne City goalkeeper.
- 11 August 2017: Maddy Evans, former Brisbane Roar midfielder.
- 11 February 2018: Shane Smeltz, former New Zealand, Brisbane Strikers, Adelaide City, Adelaide United, Wellington Phoenix, Gold Coast United, Perth Glory and Sydney FC striker.
- 16 February 2018: Ashleigh Sykes, former Australia and Canberra United striker.
- 14 April 2018: Josh Rose, former Brisbane Strikers, New Zealand Knights, Central Coast Mariners and Melbourne City defender.
- 20 April 2018: Fahid Ben Khalfallah, former Tunisia, Melbourne Victory and Brisbane Roar winger.
- 8 May 2018: Stephanie Ochs, former Canberra United defender.
- 4 June 2018: Robbie Cornthwaite, former Australia, Adelaide United and Western Sydney Wanderers defender.
