= 2007 AFF U-17 Youth Championship =

Tournament details
- Host country: Cambodia
- City: Phnom Penh
- Dates: 19 August – 1 September
- Teams: 9 (from 1 confederation)
- Venue(s): 2 (in 1 host city)

Final positions
- Champions: Thailand (1st title)
- Runners-up: Laos
- Third place: Vietnam
- Fourth place: Indonesia

Tournament statistics
- Matches played: 20
- Goals scored: 70 (3.5 per match)

The 2007 AFF U-17 Youth Championship was played for the third time in 2007. It was held in Phnom Penh, Cambodia from 19 August to 1 September 2007. Nine nations took part, all from the ASEAN region. No guest nations were invited. The nine teams were drawn into 2 groups. One group of 5 nations and the second group of 4 nations. The winners and runners up would progress to the semi-final stage.

== Squads ==
- Indonesia
- Malaysia
- Singapore

== Group stage ==
- All times are Indochina Time (ICT) – UTC+7

=== Group A ===
Team	Pld	W	D	L	GF	GA	GD	Pts
Thailand	4	3	0	1	10	5	+5	9
Indonesia	4	2	2	0	7	3	+4	8
Malaysia	4	1	2	1	13	8	+5	5
Cambodia	4	1	2	1	7	6	+1	5
Brunei	4	0	0	4	0	15	−15	0

19 August 2007
14:00

Brunei	0 – 3	Indonesia
		Sodik 45'; Yericho 70'; Ohorella 80'

Phnom Penh National Olympic Stadium

20 August 2007
09:00

Cambodia	2 – 3	Thailand
Sokngon 30'; Hou 71'		Rakpong 13'; Yooyen 45'; Nattachai 70'

Phnom Penh National Olympic Stadium

21 August 2007
14:00

Indonesia	0 – 0	Cambodia

Phnom Penh National Olympic Stadium
21 August 2007
16:15

Brunei	0 – 7	Malaysia
		Zainal 23'; Saarvindran 52'; Riduwan 59'; Samki 72', 90'; Othman 82'; Idris 88'

Phnom Penh National Olympic Stadium

23 August 2007
14:00

Brunei	0 – 3	Thailand
		Surachat 8'; Vuttipong 16'; Anusak 72'

Phnom Penh National Olympic Stadium
23 August 2007
16:15

Malaysia	2 – 2	Indonesia
Feadiansyah ?' (o.g.); Saarvindran ?'		Kurniawan 73' (pen.); Yericho ?'

Phnom Penh National Olympic Stadium

25 August 2007
14:00

Thailand	3 – 1	Malaysia
Anusak 60', 80'; Vuttipong 77'		Saarvindran 32'

Phnom Penh National Olympic Stadium
25 August 2007
16:15

Cambodia	2 – 0	Brunei
Kumpheak 18'; Soun 24'

Phnom Penh National Olympic Stadium

27 August 2007
15:00

Malaysia	3 – 3	Cambodia
Saarvindran 60', 79'; Mamat 85'		Sokngon 27', 68'; Kumpheak ?'

Phnom Penh National Olympic Stadium
27 August 2007
15:00

Thailand	1 – 2	Indonesia
Chuaisinuan 27'		Kurniawan 3'; Daosawang 7' (o.g.)

Army Stadium, Phnom Penh

=== Group B ===
Team	Pld	W	D	L	GF	GA	GD	Pts
Laos	3	2	0	1	8	4	+4	6
Vietnam	3	2	0	1	5	4	+1	6
Myanmar	3	1	1	1	5	4	+1	4
Singapore	3	0	1	2	3	9	−6	1

20 August 2007
15:00

Singapore	0 – 2	Vietnam
		Nguyễn Đình Quý 27'; Giang Trần Quách Tân 52'

Phnom Penh National Olympic Stadium

22 August 2007
15:00

Myanmar	3 – 3	Singapore
Htet Aung 43'; Thet Naing 47'; Kyi Lin 59'		Yayaha 18'; Abdul Rahman 66'; Stanely Ng 74'

Phnom Penh National Olympic Stadium

24 August 2007
14:00

Singapore	0 – 4	Laos
		Saysana 37', 50', 58'; Souksavanh 47'

Phnom Penh National Olympic Stadium
24 August 2007
16:15

Myanmar	0 – 1	Vietnam
		Nguyễn Ngọc Long 49'

Phnom Penh National Olympic Stadium

26 August 2007
15:00

Laos	0 – 2	Myanmar
		Lin Htet 40'; Htet Aung 90'

Phnom Penh National Olympic Stadium

28 August 2007
15:00

Laos	4 – 2	Vietnam
Saysana 44'; Pangnasith 62'; Sivongthong 75'; Souksabai ?'		Nguyễn Đình Lợi 15'; Nguyễn Minh Tùng 88'

Phnom Penh National Olympic Stadium

== Knockout stage ==
=== Bracket ===
Semi-finals
30 August – Phnom Penh (Army)
Thailand	2
Vietnam	0
30 August – Phnom Penh (Olympic)
Laos	3
Indonesia	0

Final
2 September – Phnom Penh (Olympic)
Thailand	3
Laos	2
Third place
2 September – Phnom Penh (Olympic)
Vietnam (p)	1 (4)
Indonesia	1 (3)

=== Semi-finals ===
30 August 2007
15:00

Thailand	2 – 0	Vietnam
Anusak 28', 85'

Army Stadium, Phnom Penh

30 August 2007
15:00

Laos	3 – 0	Indonesia
Saysana 43', 48'; Ketsada 63'

Phnom Penh National Olympic Stadium

=== Third place play-off ===
1 September 2007
08:00

Vietnam	1 – 1 (a.e.t.)	Indonesia
Giang Trần Quách Tân 29'		Sodik 18'
Penalties
	4 – 3

Phnom Penh National Olympic Stadium

=== Final ===
1 September 2007
15:00

Thailand	3 – 2	Laos
Saengpha 15'; Nattachai 21'; Anusak 27'		Pangnasith 64'; Souksabai 86'

Phnom Penh National Olympic Stadium

== Statistics ==
=== Goalscorers ===
There were 70 goals scored in 20 matches, for an average of 3.5 goals per match.

6 goals

- (Laos) Sopha Saysana
- (Thailand) Anusak Laosangthai

5 goals

- (Malaysia) D. Saarvindran

3 goals

- (Cambodia) Keo Sokngon

2 goals

- (Cambodia) Oum Kumpheak
- (Indonesia) Yericho Christiantoko
- (Indonesia) Kurniawan
- (Indonesia) Sahlan Sodik
- (Laos) Kita Souksabai
- (Malaysia) Mohamad Aminuddin Mohd Samki
- (Myanmar) Kaung Htet Aung
- (Thailand) Vuttipong Paenchum
- (Thailand) Nattachai Tosungnean
- (Vietnam) Giang Trần Quách Tân

1 goal

- (Cambodia) Hou Sambo
- (Cambodia) Soun Makara
- (Indonesia) Salim Ohorella
- (Laos) Souksavanh Bouttakhot
- (Laos) Pangnasith Phettikone
- (Laos) Khouanta Sivongthong
- (Laos) Ketsada Souksavanh
- (Malaysia) Mohd Hakim Zainal
- (Malaysia) Saiful Riduwan
- (Malaysia) Fandi Othman
- (Malaysia) Idris Zohran
- (Malaysia) Mohd Faud Mamat
- (Myanmar) Thet Naing
- (Myanmar) Kyi Lin
- (Myanmar) Zaw Lin Htet
- (Thailand) Rakpong Chumuaeng
- (Thailand) Sarach Yooyen
- (Thailand) Surachat Boomwang
- (Thailand) Vichitchai Chuaisinuan
- (Thailand) Jirayut Saengpha
- (Singapore) Mohd Fazli Yayaha
- (Singapore) Mohd Al-Qaasimy Abdul Rahman
- (Singapore) Stanley Ng
- (Vietnam) Nguyễn Đình Quý
- (Vietnam) Nguyễn Ngọc Long
- (Vietnam) Nguyễn Đình Lợi
- (Vietnam) Nguyễn Minh Tùng

1 own goal

- (Indonesia) Feadiansyah (against Malaysia)
- (Thailand) Atit Daosawang (against Indonesia)
