= 2023–24 Western Sydney Wanderers FC season =

Western Sydney Wanderers
2023–24 season
- Chairman: Paul Lederer
- Manager: Marko Rudan
- Stadium: CommBank Stadium
- A-League Men: 7th
- A-League Men Finals: DNQ
- Australia Cup: Quarter-finals
- Top goalscorer: League: Lachlan Brook, Nicolas Milanovic (9); All: Lachlan Brook (14)
- Highest home attendance: 27,998 vs. Sydney FC (2 March 2024); A-League Men
- Lowest home attendance: 2,490 vs. Adelaide United (29 August 2023); Australia Cup
- Average home league attendance: 10,573
- Biggest win: 6–1 vs. Floreat Athena (A) (9 August 2023); Australia Cup; 5–0 vs. Western United (H) (28 October 2023); A-League Men
- Biggest defeat: 7–0 vs. Melbourne City (H) (12 March 2024); A-League Men
Home colours	Away colours
- All statistics correct as of 27 April 2024.

The 2023–24 season was the twelfth in the history of Western Sydney Wanderers Football Club. The club participated in the A-League Men for the twelfth time and Australia Cup for the ninth time.

== Players ==
Note: Flags indicate national team as defined under FIFA eligibility rules; some limited exceptions apply. Players may hold more than one non-FIFA nationality.

No.	Pos.	Nation	Player
1	GK	AUS	Daniel Margush
2	DF	AUS	Gabriel Cleur
4	DF	AUS	Doni Grdić
5	MF	GER	Sonny Kittel (on loan from Raków Częstochowa)
6	DF	BRA	Marcelo (captain)
7	FW	AUS	Dylan Pierias
9	FW	SWE	Marcus Antonsson
10	MF	SRB	Miloš Ninković
11	FW	SSD	Valentino Yuel
12	DF	AUS	Ruon Tongyik
13	DF	AUS	Tate Russell
14	MF	AUS	Nicolas Milanovic
16	MF	AUS	Tom Beadling
17	FW	AUS	Lachlan Brook
19	DF	AUS	Jack Clisby
20	GK	AUS	Lawrence Thomas

No.	Pos.	Nation	Player
21	MF	NED	Jorrit Hendrix
25	MF	AUS	Joshua Brillante
26	FW	AUS	Brandon Borrello
28	FW	AUS	Aydan Hammond (scholarship)
29	MF	MLT	Dylan Scicluna
30	GK	AUS	Taiga Harper (scholarship)
31	DF	AUS	Aidan Simmons
32	FW	AUS	Nathanael Blair (scholarship)
33	DF	AUS	Alex Bonetig
35	FW	AUS	Zac Sapsford
36	MF	AUS	Oscar Priestman (scholarship)
37	FW	AUS	Alexander Badolato
38	DF	AUS	Anthony Pantazopoulos (scholarship)
39	FW	AUS	Marcus Younis (scholarship)
40	GK	AUS	Jack Gibson

== Transfers ==
=== Transfers in ===
No.	Position	Player	Transferred from	Type/fee	Contract length	Date	Ref
17	FW	Lachlan Brook	Unattached	Free transfer	2 years	15 June 2023	
7	FW	Dylan Pierias	Unattached	Free transfer	2 years	22 June 2023	
19	DF	Jack Clisby	Unattached	Free transfer	2 years	26 June 2023	
9	FW	(Sweden) Marcus Antonsson	Unattached	Free transfer	2 years	30 June 2023	
38	DF	Anthony Pantazopoulos	(Australia) Oakleigh Cannons	Free transfer	1 year scholarship	5 July 2023	
25	MF	Joshua Brillante	Melbourne Victory	Free transfer	2 years	9 July 2023	
4	DF	Doni Grdić	(Croatia) Šibenik	Free transfer	1 year	13 July 2023	
36	MF	Oscar Priestman	Sydney FC NPL	Free transfer	2 year scholarship	17 July 2023	
12	DF	Ruon Tongyik	(Iran) Mes Kerman	End of loan	(1 year)	9 August 2023	
29	MF	(Malta) Dylan Scicluna	(England) Wolverhampton Wanderers	Free transfer	1 year	3 September 2023	
21	MF	(Netherlands) Jorrit Hendrix	Unattached	Free transfer	1 year	16 September 2023	
11	FW	(South Sudan) Valentino Yuel	Unattached	Free transfer	7 months	1 December 2023	
30	GK	Taiga Harper	(Japan) Kashiwa Reysol	Free transfer	1.5 year scholarship	11 January 2024	
8	MF	Oliver Bozanic	Perth Glory	End of loan	(5 months)	12 January 2024	
28	FW	Aydan Hammond	Central Coast Mariners Academy	Free transfer	5 months	18 January 2024	
5	MF	(Germany) Sonny Kittel	(Poland) Raków Częstochowa	Loan	5 months	1 February 2024	

==== From youth squad ====
No.	Position	Player	Age	Notes	Ref
34	MF	George Antonis	20	1-year scholarship contract	
39	FW	Marcus Younis	18	2-year scholarship contract	
40	GK	Jack Gibson	20	1-year contract	

=== Transfers out ===
No.	Position	Player	Transferred to	Type/fee	Date	Ref
4	MF	(France) Morgan Schneiderlin	(France) Nice	End of loan	10 May 2023	
29	MF	Terry Antonis	Unattached	Mutual contract termination	24 May 2023	
17	MF	(France) Romain Amalfitano	Unattached	End of contract	24 May 2023	
23	FW	(Democratic Republic of the Congo) Yeni Ngbakoto	Unattached	End of contract	24 May 2023	
30	GK	Jack Warshawsky	Central Coast Mariners	End of contract	24 May 2023	
19	DF	Daniel Wilmering	Newcastle Jets	End of contract	26 May 2023	
11	FW	(Tunisia) Amor Layouni	(Norway) Vålerenga	End of loan	7 June 2023	
3	DF	(Ivory Coast) Adama Traoré	Unattached	End of contract	8 June 2023	
36	MF	Alessandro Lopane	Unattached	Mutual contract termination	8 June 2023	
—	DF	Rhys Williams	Retired		14 June 2023	
9	FW	Kusini Yengi	(England) Portsmouth	Undisclosed	2 June 2023	
28	MF	Calem Nieuwenhof	(Scotland) Heart of Midlothian	Undisclosed	22 July 2023	
5	DF	Tomislav Mrčela	(Uzbekistan) Neftchi Fergana	Mutual contract termination	25 July 2023	
8	MF	Oliver Bozanic	Perth Glory	Loan	13 September 2023	
21	MF	Jarrod Carluccio	Perth Glory	Loan	13 September 2023	
8	MF	Oliver Bozanic	Retired		17 January 2024	
34	MF	George Antonis	(Australia) Sydney Olympic	Mutual contract termination	18 January 2024	

=== Contract extensions ===
No.	Player	Position	Duration	Date	Notes	Ref
16	Tom Beadling	Central midfielder	2 years	6 June 2023		
37	Alexander Badolato	Striker	3 years	16 July 2023		
10	(Serbia) Miloš Ninković	Attacking midfielder	1 year	8 August 2023		
33	Alex Bonetig	Central defender	2 years	16 November 2023	Contract extended from end of 2023–24 to end of 2025–26	
31	Aidan Simmons	Right-back	2 years	17 November 2023	Contract extended from end of 2023–24 to end of 2025–26	
26	Brandon Borrello	Right winger	3 years	22 January 2024	Contract extended from end of 2023–24 to end of 2026–27	

== Pre-season and friendlies ==
Win Draw Loss Fixtures

2 October 2023	Western United	2–1	Western Sydney Wanderers	Melbourne
	Thurgate; Penha	Report	Goal	Stadium: The Hangar; Attendance: 0 (behind closed doors)

6 October 2023	Adelaide United	1–0	Western Sydney Wanderers	Adelaide
15:00	Barr 90'	Report		Stadium: Coopers Stadium; Attendance: 0 (behind closed doors)

13 October 2023	Newcastle Jets	2–2	Western Sydney Wanderers	Maitland
	Stamatelopoulos 2'; Buhagiar 50'	Report	Beadling (?); Blair (?)	Stadium: Maitland Sportsground; Attendance: 0 (behind closed doors); Referee: Tim Danaskos

== Competitions ==
=== Overall record ===
Competition	First match	Last match	Starting round	Final position	Record							
Competition	First match	Last match	Starting round	Final position	Pld	W	D	L	GF	GA	GD	Win %
A-League Men	22 October 2023	29 April 2024	Matchday 1	7th	27	11	4	12	44	48	−4	40.74
Australia Cup	9 August 2023	16 September 2023	Round of 32	Quarter-finals	3	2	0	1	13	6	+7	66.67
Total					30	13	4	13	57	54	+3	43.33

Last updated: 27 April 2024
Source: Soccerway

=== A-League Men ===
==== League table ====
Pos	Team	Pld	W	D	L	GF	GA	GD	Pts	Qualification
5	Macarthur FC	27	11	8	8	45	48	−3	41	Qualification for Finals series (Note: The top two teams enter the finals series at the semi-finals, while the teams ranked third to sixth enter the finals series at the elimination-finals.)
6	Melbourne City	27	11	6	10	50	38	+12	39	Qualification for Finals series
7	Western Sydney Wanderers	27	11	4	12	44	48	−4	37	
8	Adelaide United	27	9	5	13	52	53	−1	32	
9	Brisbane Roar	27	8	6	13	42	55	−13	30	Qualification for 2024 Australia Cup play-offs

Source: A-Leagues
Rules for classification: 1) points; 2) wins; 3) goal difference; 4) goals scored; 5) head-to-head results; 5a) head-to-head points; 5b) head-to-head goal difference; 6) Fair Play points; 7) away goal difference; 8) away goals per match; 9) home goal difference; 10) home goals per match; 11) toss of a coin in an event of a tie of two clubs.

==== Results summary ====
Away figures include Western Sydney Wanderers 1–0 win on neutral ground against Melbourne City on 12 January 2024.

Overall								Home						Away					
Pld	W	D	L	GF	GA	GD	Pts	W	D	L	GF	GA	GD	W	D	L	GF	GA	GD
27	11	4	12	44	48	−4	37	4	2	7	23	22	+1	7	2	5	21	26	−5

Last updated: 27 April 2024.
Source: Ultimate A-League

==== Results by round ====
Round	1	2	3	4	5	6	7	8	9	10	11	27	13	14	15	16	17	18	19	20	12	21	22	23	24	25	26
Ground	H	H	A	H	A	A	H	H	A	H	H	N	H	A	A	H	A	A	H	H	A	A	A	H	A	H	A
Result	D	W	D	W	W	D	L	W	L	W	L	W	L	W	L	D	L	W	L	L	L	W	W	L	L	L	W
Position	9	3	5	1	1	2	5	3	3	3	3	3	3	4	5	5	6	5	6	6	7	6	6	6	6	7	7
Points	1	4	5	8	11	12	12	15	15	18	18	21	21	24	24	25	25	28	28	28	28	31	34	34	34	34	37

Updated to match(es) played on 27 April 2024. Source: Ultimate A-League
A = Away; H = Home; N = Neutral; W = Win; D = Draw; L = Loss

==== Matches ====
Win Draw Loss Fixtures

22 October 2023 1	Western Sydney Wanderers	0–0	Wellington Phoenix	Sydney
15:00 AEDT		Report		Stadium: CommBank Stadium; Attendance: 10,468; Referee: Ben Abraham

28 October 2023 2	Western Sydney Wanderers	5–0	Western United	Sydney
17:30 AEDT	Brook 6', 13'; Milanovic 34', 45+3'; Marcelo 39'	Report		Stadium: CommBank Stadium; Attendance: 8,098; Referee: Alex King

5 November 2023 3	Newcastle Jets	2–2	Western Sydney Wanderers	Newcastle
15:00 AEDT	Stamatelopoulos 18', 37'	Report	Brillante 61'; Antonsson 81'	Stadium: McDonald Jones Stadium; Attendance: 5,166; Referee: Ben Abraham

11 November 2023 4	Western Sydney Wanderers	2–0	Perth Glory	Sydney
17:30 AEDT	Clisby 50'; Russell 57'	Report		Stadium: CommBank Stadium; Attendance: 9,971; Referee: Daniel Elder

25 November 2023 5	Sydney FC	0–1	Western Sydney Wanderers	Sydney
19:45 AEDT		Report	Sapsford 72'	Stadium: Allianz Stadium; Attendance: 28,152; Referee: Daniel Elder

1 December 2023 6	Brisbane Roar	2–2	Western Sydney Wanderers	Brisbane
19:35 AEST	Mileusnic 13'; Hingert 15'	Report	Milanovic 46'; Antonsson 88'	Stadium: Suncorp Stadium; Attendance: 5,977; Referee: Daniel Elder
Note: Match originally scheduled for 18:45 AEST, but delayed due to thunderstorms. It was rescheduled for 19:05 AEST, then 19:35 AEST.

10 December 2023 7	Western Sydney Wanderers	3–4	Melbourne Victory	Sydney
17:00 AEDT	Antonsson 57' (pen.), 88'; Yuel 90+1'	Report	Fornaroli 8', 46', 51' (pen.), 74'	Stadium: CommBank Stadium; Attendance: 9,755; Referee: Ben Abraham

15 December 2023 8	Western Sydney Wanderers	1–0	Adelaide United	Sydney
19:45 AEDT	Pierias 23'	Report		Stadium: CommBank Stadium; Attendance: 8,034; Referee: Alireza Faghani

23 December 2023 9	Wellington Phoenix	2–0	Western Sydney Wanderers	Wellington
17:30 NZDT	Barbarouses 90+1'; Old 90+4'	Report		Stadium: Sky Stadium; Attendance: 7,294; Referee: Casey Reibelt

1 January 2024 10	Western Sydney Wanderers	3–1	Macarthur FC	Sydney
17:00 AEDT	Antonsson 3'; Simmons 12'; Yuel 84'	Report	Hollman 20'	Stadium: CommBank Stadium; Attendance: 11,382; Referee: Shaun Evans

6 January 2024 11	Western Sydney Wanderers	0–1	Central Coast Mariners	Sydney
17:30 AEDT		Report	Túlio 25'	Stadium: CommBank Stadium; Attendance: 11,982; Referee: Alex King

12 January 2024 27	Melbourne City	0–1	Western Sydney Wanderers	Sydney
20:15 AEDT		Report	Pierias 27'	Stadium: CommBank Stadium; Attendance: 7,117; Referee: Jonathan Barreiro

20 January 2024 13	Western Sydney Wanderers	1–2	Perth Glory	Sydney
19:45 AEDT	Sail 90+6' (o.g.)	Report	Colakovski 31'; Williams 87'	Stadium: CommBank Stadium; Attendance: 8,779; Referee: Ben Abraham

27 January 2024 14	Western United	0–1	Western Sydney Wanderers	Hobart
17:30 AEDT		Report	Brook 35'	Stadium: North Hobart Oval; Attendance: 3,850; Referee: Alex King

4 February 2024 15	Macarthur FC	4–3	Western Sydney Wanderers	Sydney
17:00 AEDT	Germain 18' (pen.), 45+4', 90+3'; Rodrigues 32'	Report	Brook 20', 42'; Milanovic 28'	Stadium: Campbelltown Sports Stadium; Attendance: 5,102; Referee: Adam Kersey

11 February 2024 16	Western Sydney Wanderers	3–3	Newcastle Jets	Sydney
17:00 AEDT	Brook 28', 31'; Marcelo 90+2'	Report	Buhagiar 5'; Stamatelopoulos 50' (pen.), 70'	Stadium: CommBank Stadium; Attendance: 9,967; Referee: Shaun Evans

18 February 2024 17	Central Coast Mariners	1–0	Western Sydney Wanderers	Gosford
17:00 AEDT	Doka 83' (pen.)	Report		Stadium: Industree Group Stadium; Attendance: 7,568; Referee: Daniel Elder

24 February 2024 18	Adelaide United	1–2	Western Sydney Wanderers	Adelaide
19:15 ACDT	Jovanovic 90+4'	Report	Milanovic 18', 35'	Stadium: Coopers Stadium; Attendance: 8,908; Referee: Alex King

2 March 2024 19	Western Sydney Wanderers	1–4	Sydney FC	Sydney
19:45 AEDT	Girdwood-Reich 72' (o.g.)	Report	Grant 3'; Gomes 7' (pen.), 59'; Mak 50'	Stadium: CommBank Stadium; Attendance: 27,998; Referee: Alex King

8 March 2024 20	Western Sydney Wanderers	1–3	Western United	Sydney
19:45 AEDT	Milanovic 52'	Report	Grimaldi 69'; Penha 77'; Rukavytsya 81'	Stadium: CommBank Stadium; Attendance: 5,784; Referee: Ben Abraham

12 March 2024 12	Melbourne City	7–0	Western Sydney Wanderers	Melbourne
19:00	Arslan 30', 32'; Natel 39'; Caputo 42'; Reis 72'; Maclaren 77'; Antonis 82'	Report		Stadium: AAMI Park; Attendance: 2,182; Referee: Jack Morgan
Note: Originally scheduled for 13 January 2024, was moved due to Unite Round. It was later rescheduled again.

16 March 2024 21	Perth Glory	1–2	Western Sydney Wanderers	Perth
16:45 AWST	Taggart 45+2'	Report	Borrello 11'; Brook 83'	Stadium: HBF Park; Attendance: 5,952; Referee: Shaun Evans

1 April 2024 22	Macarthur FC	1–3	Western Sydney Wanderers	Sydney
15:00	Millar 86'	Report	Milanovic 57'; Kittel 65'; Hendrix 70'	Stadium: Campbelltown Sports Stadium; Attendance: 6,238; Referee: Alireza Faghani

5 April 2024 23	Western Sydney Wanderers	1–2	Brisbane Roar	Sydney
19:45 AEST	Pierias 64'	Report	Aldred 32'; Hore 77'	Stadium: CommBank Stadium; Attendance: 5,127; Referee: Daniel Elder

13 April 2024 24	Sydney FC	2–1	Western Sydney Wanderers	Sydney
19:45 AEST	Gomes 72'; Kucharski 90+8'	Report	Sapsford 90+5'	Stadium: Allianz Stadium; Attendance: 26,155; Referee: Alireza Faghani

20 April 2024 25	Western Sydney Wanderers	1–2	Melbourne City	Sydney
15:30 AEST	Younis 69'	Report	Natel 28'; Jakoliš 39'	Stadium: CommBank Stadium; Attendance: 10,098; Referee: Ben Abraham

27 April 2024 26	Melbourne Victory	3–4	Western Sydney Wanderers	Melbourne
19:45 AEST	Machach 4'; Arzani 15', 55'	Report	Brook 20'; Milanovic 35'; Hammond 73'; Priestman 87'	Stadium: AAMI Park; Attendance: 10,723; Referee: Alireza Faghani

=== Australia Cup ===
Win Draw Loss

9 August 2023 Round of 32	Floreat Athena (Western Australia)	1–6	Western Sydney Wanderers	Perth
18:30 AWST	Ambrogio 53'	Report	Brook 3', 19', 77', 83', 90+2'; Borrello 20'	Stadium: Kingsway Sporting Complex; Attendance: 723; Referee: Lachlan Keevers

29 August 2023 Round of 16	Western Sydney Wanderers	5–1	Adelaide United	Sydney
19:30 AEST	Antonsson 2', 45+1'; Borrello 38', 56'; Ninković 56'	Report	Clough 81'	Stadium: Marconi Stadium; Attendance: 2,490; Referee: Ben Abraham

16 September 2023 Quarter-finals	Brisbane Roar	4–2	Western Sydney Wanderers	Brisbane
17:30 AEST	Armiento 29'; Waddingham 40'; Caletti 64'; Hore 72'	Report	Antonsson 18'; Clisby 57'	Stadium: Perry Park; Attendance: 3,926; Referee: Alireza Faghani

== Statistics ==
=== Appearances and goals ===
Includes all competitions. Players with no appearances not included in the list.

As of 27 April 2024

No.	Pos.	Nat.	Player	A-League Men		Australia Cup		Total					
No.	Pos.	Nat.	Player	Apps	Goals	Apps	Goals	Apps	Goals				
No.	Pos.	Nat.	Player	1	GK	(Australia)	Daniel Margush	9	0	0	0	9	0
2	DF	(Australia)	Gabriel Cleur	3+10	0	2+1	0	16	0				
4	DF	(Australia)	Doni Grdić	0+1	0	1+1	0	3	0				
5	MF	(Germany)	Sonny Kittel	6+4	1	0	0	10	1				
6	DF	(Brazil)	Marcelo	26	2	3	0	29	2				
7	FW	(Australia)	Dylan Pierias	10+15	3	3	0	28	3				
9	FW	(Sweden)	Marcus Antonsson	22+2	5	2+1	3	27	8				
10	MF	(Serbia)	Miloš Ninković	3+11	0	3	1	17	1				
11	FW	(South Sudan)	Valentino Yuel	3+4	2	0	0	7	2				
13	DF	(Australia)	Tate Russell	9+7	1	0	0	16	1				
14	FW	(Australia)	Nicolas Milanovic	23+2	9	0+2	0	27	9				
16	MF	(Australia)	Tom Beadling	12+5	0	3	0	20	0				
17	FW	(Australia)	Lachlan Brook	16+7	9	1+1	5	25	14				
19	DF	(Australia)	Jack Clisby	26+1	1	3	1	30	2				
20	GK	(Australia)	Lawrence Thomas	16+1	0	3	0	20	0				
21	MF	(Netherlands)	Jorrit Hendrix	20	1	0	0	20	1				
25	MF	(Australia)	Joshua Brillante	18	1	3	0	21	1				
26	FW	(Australia)	Brandon Borrello	13+2	1	3	3	18	4				
28	FW	(Australia)	Aydan Hammond	0+3	1	0	0	3	1				
29	MF	(Malta)	Dylan Scicluna	3+13	0	0	0	16	0				
30	GK	(Australia)	Taiga Harper	1	0	0	0	1	0				
31	DF	(Australia)	Aidan Simmons	16+3	1	1+1	0	21	1				
32	FW	(Australia)	Nathanael Blair	0+4	0	0	0	4	0				
33	DF	(Australia)	Alex Bonetig	13	0	2	0	15	0				
35	MF	(Australia)	Zac Sapsford	3+9	2	0+2	0	14	2				
36	MF	(Australia)	Oscar Priestman	14+11	0	0+3	0	28	0				
37	FW	(Australia)	Alexander Badolato	10+2	0	0	0	12	0				
38	DF	(Australia)	Anthony Pantazopoulos	1+1	0	0	0	2	0				
39	FW	(Australia)	Marcus Younis	0+10	1	0+2	0	12	1				
40	GK	(Australia)	Jack Gibson	1	0	0	0	1	0				
44	DF	(Australia)	Nathan Barrie	0+2	0	0	0	2	0				
Player(s) transferred out but featured this season
21	MF	(Australia)	Jarrod Carluccio	0	0	0+1	0	1	0				

=== Disciplinary record ===
Includes all competitions. The list is sorted by squad number when total cards are equal. Players with no cards not included in the list.

As of 27 April 2024

Rank	No.	Pos.	Nat.	Name	A-League Men			Australia Cup			Total		
Rank	No.	Pos.	Nat.	Name	Yellow card	(yellow card) (yellow-red card)	Red card	Yellow card	(yellow card) (yellow-red card)	Red card	Yellow card	(yellow card) (yellow-red card)	Red card
1	16	MF	(Australia)	Tom Beadling	1	0	1	1	0	0	2	0	1
1	31	DF	(Australia)	Aidan Simmons	2	0	1	0	0	0	2	0	1
3	21	MF	(Netherlands)	Jorrit Hendrix	1	0	1	0	0	0	1	0	1
3	25	MF	(Australia)	Joshua Brillante	1	0	1	0	0	0	1	0	1
5	13	DF	(Australia)	Tate Russell	0	1	0	0	0	0	0	1	0
6	36	MF	(Australia)	Oscar Priestman	7	0	0	0	0	0	7	0	0
7	6	DF	(Brazil)	Marcelo	6	0	0	0	0	0	6	0	0
7	19	DF	(Australia)	Jack Clisby	5	0	0	1	0	0	6	0	0
9	14	FW	(Australia)	Nicolas Milanovic	5	0	0	0	0	0	5	0	0
10	10	MF	(Serbia)	Miloš Ninković	3	0	0	0	0	0	3	0	0
11	26	FW	(Australia)	Brandon Borrello	2	0	0	0	0	0	2	0	0
11	29	MF	(Malta)	Dylan Scicluna	2	0	0	0	0	0	2	0	0
13	2	DF	(Australia)	Gabriel Cleur	1	0	0	0	0	0	1	0	0
13	5	MF	(Germany)	Sonny Kittel	1	0	0	0	0	0	1	0	0
13	7	FW	(Australia)	Dylan Pierias	1	0	0	0	0	0	1	0	0
13	20	GK	(Australia)	Lawrence Thomas	1	0	0	0	0	0	1	0	0
13	33	DF	(Australia)	Alex Bonetig	1	0	0	0	0	0	1	0	0
13	37	MF	(Australia)	Alexander Badolato	1	0	0	0	0	0	1	0	0
13	39	FW	(Australia)	Marcus Younis	1	0	0	0	0	0	1	0	0
13	44	DF	(Australia)	Nathan Barrie	1	0	0	0	0	0	1	0	0
Total					43	1	4	2	0	0	45	1	4

=== Clean sheets ===
Includes all competitions. The list is sorted by squad number when total clean sheets are equal. Numbers in parentheses represent games where both goalkeepers participated and both kept a clean sheet; the number in parentheses is awarded to the goalkeeper who was substituted on, whilst a full clean sheet is awarded to the goalkeeper who was on the field at the start and end of play. Goalkeepers with no clean sheets not included in the list.

As of 27 April 2024

Rank	No.	Nat.	Goalkeeper	A-League Men	Australia Cup	Total
1	20	(Australia)	Lawrence Thomas	5	0	5
2	1	(Australia)	Daniel Margush	2	0	2
Total				7	0	7

== See also ==
- 2023–24 Western Sydney Wanderers FC (A-League Women) season
