= 2017 AFF U-15 Championship =

ฟุตบอลชิงแชมป์แห่งชาติอาเซียน รุ่นอายุไม่เกิน 15 ปี 2017

Tournament details
- Host country: Thailand
- City: Chonburi
- Dates: 9–22 July
- Teams: 12 (from 1 sub-confederation)
- Venue: 2 (in 1 host city)

Final positions
- Champions: Vietnam (3rd title)
- Runners-up: Thailand
- Third place: Australia
- Fourth place: Malaysia

Tournament statistics
- Matches played: 34
- Goals scored: 96 (2.82 per match)
- Top scorer: (Cambodia) Sieng Chanthea (5 goals)

The 2017 AFF U-15 Championship was the twelfth edition of the AFF U-16 Championship (first edition of the under-15 era), the annual international youth association football championship organised by the ASEAN Football Federation for men's under-15 national teams of Southeast Asia. It had reverted from an under-16 competition to an under-15 competition in preparation for the AFC U-16 Championship 2018 qualifiers. Thailand, which were selected to host the tournament, returning for the first time since the cancelled 2009 AFF U-16 Youth Championship. Vietnam won the tournament after beating Thailand 4–2 on penalties in the final.

A total of 12 teams played in the tournament, with players born on or after 1 January 2002 eligible to participate. Each match had a duration of 80 minutes, consisting of two halves of 40 minutes.

== Participant teams ==
There was no qualification, and all entrants advanced to the final tournament. The following 12 teams from member associations of the ASEAN Football Federation entered the tournament.

Team	Association	App	Previous best performance
Australia	FF Australia	6th	Winners (2008, 2016)
Brunei	FA Brunei DS	6th	Group stage (5 times)
Cambodia	FF Cambodia	8th	Fourth place (2016)
Indonesia	FA Indonesia	8th	Runners-up (2013)
Laos	Lao FF	10th	Runners-up (2002, 2007, 2011)
Malaysia	FA Malaysia	9th	Winners (2013)
Myanmar	Myanmar FF	9th	Winners (2002, 2005)
Philippines	Philippine FF	6th	Group stage (5 times)
Singapore	FA Singapore	8th	Fourth place (2008, 2011)
Thailand (H)	FA Thailand	8th	Winners (2007, 2011, 2015)
Timor-Leste	FF Timor-Leste	5th	Third place (2010)
Vietnam	Vietnam FF	10th	Winners (2006, 2010)

== Venues ==
The competition was played at two venues in Chonburi, Chonburi Province: Chonburi Campus Stadium and Chonburi Stadium (in Mueang Chonburi).

Chonburi Province	Mueang Chonburi

Group stage	Knockout stage
Chonburi Campus Stadium	Chonburi Stadium
13°24′41″N 100°59′34″E	13°20′14″N 100°57′18″E
Capacity: 12,000	Capacity: 8,680

== Draw ==
Pot 1	Pot 2	Pot 3	Pot 4	Pot 5	Pot 6
Australia (1); Vietnam (2)	Thailand (3); Cambodia (4)	Laos (5); Malaysia (6)	Myanmar (7); Timor-Leste (8)	Singapore (9); Brunei (10)	Philippines (11); Indonesia (unranked)

== Group stage ==
The top two teams of each group advanced to the semi-finals.

Tiebreakers

The teams are ranked according to points (3 points for a win, 1 point for a draw, 0 points for a loss). If tied on points, tiebreakers are applied in the following order:

1. Goal difference in all the group matches;
2. Greater number of goals scored in all the group matches;
3. Result of the direct match between the teams concerned;
4. Kicks from the penalty mark if the teams concerned are still on the field of play.
5. Lowest score using Fair Play Criteria;
6. Drawing of lots.
- All matches held in Thailand.
- All times are local, UTC+7.

=== Group A ===
Pos	Team	Pld	W	D	L	GF	GA	GD	Pts	Qualification
1	Thailand (H)	5	5	0	0	8	2	+6	15	Knockout stage
2	Australia	5	4	0	1	24	6	+18	12	Knockout stage
3	Myanmar	5	2	1	2	6	8	−2	7	
4	Laos	5	2	0	3	7	9	−2	6	
5	Indonesia	5	1	1	3	9	13	−4	4	
6	Singapore	5	0	0	5	0	16	−16	0	

Source: aseanfootball.org
Rules for classification: Tiebreakers
(H) Hosts
9 July 2017
16:00

Australia	1–2	Thailand
Ostler 23'	Report	Suphanat 28'; Simmons 73' (o.g.)

Chonburi Campus Stadium 1, Chonburi
Attendance: 800
Referee: Mohammad Zamzaidi Katimin (Malaysia)
9 July 2017
18:30

Laos	2–0	Singapore
Souphan 67'; Chony 70'	Report

Chonburi Campus Stadium 1, Chonburi
Attendance: 50
Referee: Amdillah Zainuddin (Brunei)
9 July 2017
16:00

Myanmar	2–2	Indonesia
Naung Naung Soe 31' (pen.); La Min Htwe 33'	Report	Nyan Lin Htet 4' (o.g.); Pradika 80+2'

Chonburi Campus Stadium 2, Chonburi
Referee: Ngo Duy Lan (Vietnam)

11 July 2017
16:00

Laos	0–2	Myanmar
	Report	Naung Naung Soe 65'; La Min Htwe 80'

Chonburi Campus Stadium 1, Chonburi
Attendance: 100
Referee: Khoun Virak (Cambodia)
11 July 2017
18:30

Indonesia	0–1	Thailand
	Report	Suphanat 74'

Chonburi Campus Stadium 1, Chonburi
Attendance: 500
Referee: Hoang Ngoc Ha (Vietnam)
11 July 2017
16:00

Singapore	0–8	Australia
	Report	Warland 6'; Kirdar 7'; Kucharski 17'; Antonis 31'; Darjani 40', 49'; Main 71'; Varga 75'

Chonburi Campus Stadium 2, Chonburi
Attendance: 120
Referee: Chi Samdy (Cambodia)

13 July 2017
16:00

Singapore	0–2	Myanmar
	Report	Yan Kyaw Soe 20'; La Min Htwe 29'

Chonburi Campus Stadium 1, Chonburi
Attendance: 80
Referee: Amdillah Zainuddin (Brunei)
13 July 2017
18:30

Australia	7–3	Indonesia
Ostler 9'; Botic 11', 30'; Sepping 14'; Kirdar 35'; Teague 55'; De Robillard 65'	Report	Kahfi 3', 8', 63'

Chonburi Campus Stadium 1, Chonburi
Attendance: 150
Referee: Ngo Duy Lan (Vietnam)
13 July 2017
16:00

Thailand	2–1	Laos
Thanarat 57'; Suphanat 61'	Report	Chony 51'

Chonburi Campus Stadium 2, Chonburi
Attendance: 300
Referee: Mohammad Zamzaidi Katimin (Malaysia)

15 July 2017
16:00

Indonesia	2–3	Laos
Alrizky 32'; Juliansyah 64'	Report	Khamsavanh 13'; Soubanh 40'; Chony 65'

Chonburi Campus Stadium 1, Chonburi
Attendance: 70
Referee: Chi Samdy (Cambodia)
15 July 2017
18:30

Thailand	2–0	Singapore
Thakdanai 60'; Kittiphong 80'	Report

Chonburi Campus Stadium 1, Chonburi
Attendance: 500
Referee: Khoun Virak (Cambodia)
15 July 2017
16:00

Myanmar	0–5	Australia
	Report	Broyce 18'; Varga 48'; Sepping 50'; Duzel 55'; Botic 70'

Chonburi Campus Stadium 2, Chonburi
Attendance: 250
Referee: Hoang Ngoc Ha (Vietnam)

17 July 2017
16:00

Australia	3–1	Laos
Kucharski 26'; Stellitano 52', 59'	Report	Chony 40'

Chonburi Campus Stadium 1, Chonburi
Referee: Mohammad Zamzaidi Katimin (Malaysia)
17 July 2017
18:30

Thailand	1–0	Myanmar
Suphanat 69'	Report

Chonburi Campus Stadium 1, Chonburi
Attendance: 300
Referee: Chi Samdy (Cambodia)
17 July 2017
16:00

Singapore	0–2	Indonesia
	Report	Brylian 55', 61'

Chonburi Campus Stadium 2, Chonburi
Attendance: 21
Referee: Ngo Duy Lan (Vietnam)

=== Group B ===
Pos	Team	Pld	W	D	L	GF	GA	GD	Pts	Qualification
1	Vietnam	5	5	0	0	16	2	+14	15	Knockout stage
2	Malaysia	5	4	0	1	11	3	+8	12	Knockout stage
3	Cambodia	5	2	0	3	8	8	0	6	
4	Brunei	5	1	2	2	3	5	−2	5	
5	Philippines	5	1	1	3	2	13	−11	4	
6	Timor-Leste	5	0	1	4	0	9	−9	1	

Source: aseanfootball.org
Rules for classification: Tiebreakers
10 July 2017
16:00

Vietnam	2–1	Cambodia
Vũ Tiến Long 29'; Nguyễn Bá Dương 76'	Report	Chanthea 3'

Chonburi Campus Stadium 1, Chonburi
Attendance: 100
Referee: Warintorn Sassadee (Thailand)
10 July 2017
18:30

Timor-Leste	0–0	Brunei
	Report

Chonburi Campus Stadium 1, Chonburi
Attendance: 50
Referee: Xaypasert Phongsanit (Laos)
10 July 2017
16:00

Malaysia	2–0	Philippines
Khalili 31'; Hafizo 58'	Report

Chonburi Campus Stadium 2, Chonburi
Attendance: 100
Referee: Chan Nathan Rong De (Singapore)

12 July 2017
16:00

Timor-Leste	0–2	Malaysia
	Report	Danish 31'; Harith 64'

Chonburi Campus Stadium 1, Chonburi
Attendance: 50
Referee: Oki Dwi Putra Senjaya (Indonesia)
12 July 2017
18:30

Philippines	0–4	Cambodia
	Report	Chanthea 9', 14', 44'; Darapich 20'

Chonburi Campus Stadium 1, Chonburi
Attendance: 100
Referee: Pummarin Khamruen (Thailand)
12 July 2017
18:30

Brunei	1–2	Vietnam
Masri 36'	Report	Nguyễn Bá Dương 16'; Nguyễn Quốc Hoàng 79'

Chonburi Campus Stadium 2, Chonburi
Attendance: 30
Referee: Mongkolchai Pechsri (Thailand)

14 July 2017
16:00

Brunei	0–3	Malaysia
	Report	Azrul 4'; Azzim 37'; Ashrafiq 48'

Chonburi Campus Stadium 1, Chonburi
Attendance: 50
Referee: Warintorn Sassadee (Thailand)
14 July 2017
18:30

Vietnam	7–0	Philippines
Đinh Thanh Trung 3', 67'; Nguyễn Thế Hùng 4'; Ngô Quang Thuận 17'; Võ Nguyên Hoàng 47'; Khuất Văn Khang 75'; Trịnh Văn Chung 80'	Report

Chonburi Campus Stadium 1, Chonburi
Attendance: 150
Referee: Chan Nathan Rong De (Singapore)
14 July 2017
16:00

Cambodia	1–0	Timor-Leste
Chanthea 41'	Report

Chonburi Campus Stadium 2, Chonburi
Attendance: 50
Referee: Xaypasert Phongsanit (Laos)

16 July 2017
16:00

Philippines	2–0	Timor-Leste
Gonzales 15'; Padernal 58'	Report

Chonburi Campus Stadium 1, Chonburi
Attendance: 50
Referee: Amdillah Zainuddin (Brunei)
16 July 2017
18:30

Cambodia	0–2	Brunei
	Report	Raimi 56', 65'

Chonburi Campus Stadium 1, Chonburi
Attendance: 100
Referee: Oki Dwi Putra Senjaya (Indonesia)
16 July 2017
16:00

Malaysia	0–1	Vietnam
Jaineh (yellow card) 71' (yellow-red card) 80'	Report	Ngô Quang Thuận 3'

Chonburi Campus Stadium 2, Chonburi
Attendance: 50
Referee: Pummarin Khamruen (Thailand)

18 July 2017
16:00

Vietnam	4–0	Timor-Leste
Nguyễn Bá Dương 25'; Trịnh Quang Trường 43'; Ngô Đức Hoàng 58'; Trịnh Văn Chung 67'	Report	da Costa (red card) 42'

Chonburi Campus Stadium 1, Chonburi
Attendance: 30
Referee: Khoun Virak (Cambodia)
18 July 2017
18:30

Cambodia	2–4	Malaysia
Bunnarong 47', 70'	Report	Azzim 22'; Danial 30'; Ashrafiq 73', 82'

Chonburi Campus Stadium 1, Chonburi
Attendance: 100
Referee: Hoang Ngoc Ha (Vietnam)
18 July 2017
16:00

Brunei	0–0	Philippines
	Report

Chonburi Campus Stadium 2, Chonburi
Attendance: 50
Referee: Pummarin Khamruen (Thailand)

== Knockout stage ==
In the knockout stage, the penalty shoot-outs are used to decide the winner if necessary (extra time is not used).

=== Bracket ===
Semi-finals
20 July – Chonburi
Thailand	1
Malaysia	0
20 July – Chonburi
Vietnam	2
Australia	0

Final
22 July – Chonburi
Thailand	0 (2)
Vietnam (p)	0 (4)
Third place match
22 July – Chonburi
Malaysia	2
Australia	3

=== Semi-finals ===
20 July 2017
16:00

Thailand	1–0	Malaysia
Jakkapong 17'	Report

Chonburi Stadium, Chonburi
Attendance: 250
Referee: Chan Nathan Rong De (Singapore)
20 July 2017
18:30

Vietnam	2–0	Australia
Nguyễn Quốc Hoàng 29'; Võ Nguyên Hoàng 32'	Report

Chonburi Stadium, Chonburi
Attendance: 100
Referee: Xaypasert Phongsanit (Laos)

=== Third place match ===
22 July 2017
16:00

Malaysia	2–3	Australia
Azzim 7'; Danial 80'	Report	Kucharski 16'; Antonis 38'; Kirdar 76'

Chonburi Stadium, Chonburi
Attendance: 250
Referee: Warintorn Sassadee (Thailand)

=== Final ===
22 July 2017
18:30

Thailand	0–0	Vietnam
	Report
Penalties
Jakkapong (penalty missed); Pongsakorn (penalty scored); Kittichai (penalty scored); Sarawut (penalty missed)	2–4	(penalty scored) Đinh Thanh Trung; (penalty scored) Ngô Quang Thuận; (penalty scored) Đoàn Chí Bảo; (penalty scored) Trịnh Quang Trường

Chonburi Stadium, Chonburi
Attendance: 2,300
Referee: Oki Dwi Putra (Indonesia)

== Winner ==
2017 AFF U-15 Championship Winners
(Vietnam)
Vietnam
3rd title

== Goalscorers ==
5 goals

- (Cambodia) Sieng Chanthea

4 goals

- (Laos) Chony Wenpaserth
- (Thailand) Suphanat Mueanta

3 goals

- (Australia) Noah Botic
- (Australia) Birkan Kirdar
- (Australia) Jaiden Kucharski
- (Indonesia) Bagus Kahfi
- (Malaysia) Muhammad Amirul Ashrafiq Hanifah
- (Malaysia) Muhammad Amirul Azzim Mohd Ruzki
- (Myanmar) La Min Htwe
- (Vietnam) Nguyễn Bá Dương

2 goals

- (Australia) George Antonis
- (Australia) Navarone Darjani
- (Australia) Trent Ostler
- (Australia) Lachlan Sepping
- (Australia) Giovanni Stellitano
- (Australia) Joshua Varga
- (Brunei) Addy Raimi
- (Cambodia) Bunthoeun Bunnarong
- (Indonesia) Brylian Aldama
- (Malaysia) Muhammad Danial Amali
- (Myanmar) Naung Naung Soe
- (Vietnam) Đinh Thanh Trung
- (Vietnam) Ngô Quang Thuận
- (Vietnam) Nguyễn Quốc Hoàng
- (Vietnam) Trịnh Văn Chung
- (Vietnam) Võ Nguyên Hoàng

1 goal

- (Australia) Brodie Broyce
- (Australia) Stephan de Robillard
- (Australia) Luke Duzel
- (Australia) Thomas Main
- (Australia) Ryan Teague
- (Australia) Riley Warland
- (Brunei) Aminuddin Haji Masri
- (Cambodia) Ros Darapich
- (Indonesia) Althaf Alrizky
- (Indonesia) Rendy Juliansyah
- (Indonesia) Miftakhul Pradika
- (Laos) Khamsavanh Louanthammakhanh
- (Laos) Soubanh Keopheth
- (Laos) Souphan Khambaion
- (Malaysia) Mohammad Ikhwan Mohd Hafizo
- (Malaysia) Mohammad Danish Ishak
- (Malaysia) Harith Naem Jaineh
- (Malaysia) Ahmad Zikri Mohd Khalili
- (Malaysia) Muhammad Azrul Haikal Ramlee
- (Myanmar) Yan Kyaw Soe
- (Philippines) Asignar Gonzales
- (Philippines) Ferrer Padernal
- (Thailand) Kittiphong Khetpara
- (Thailand) Thanarat Thumsen
- (Thailand) Thakdanai Jaihan
- (Vietnam) Khuất Văn Khang
- (Vietnam) Ngô Đức Hoàng
- (Vietnam) Nguyễn Thế Hùng
- (Vietnam) Trịnh Quang Trường
- (Vietnam) Vũ Tiến Long

1 own goal

- (Australia) Jack Simmons (playing against Thailand)
- (Myanmar) Nyan Lin Htet (playing against Indonesia)

== Final ranking ==
Pos	Team	Pld	W	D	L	GF	GA	GD	Pts	Final result
1	Vietnam	7	6	1	0	18	2	+16	19	Champion
2	Thailand	7	6	1	0	9	2	+7	19	Runner-up
3	Australia	7	5	0	2	27	10	+17	15	Third place
4	Malaysia	7	4	0	3	13	7	+6	12	Fourth place
5	Myanmar	5	2	1	2	6	8	−2	7	Eliminated in group stage
6	Cambodia	5	2	0	3	8	8	0	6	Eliminated in group stage
7	Laos	5	2	0	3	7	9	−2	6	Eliminated in group stage
8	Brunei	5	1	2	2	3	5	−2	5	Eliminated in group stage
9	Indonesia	5	1	1	3	9	13	−4	4	Eliminated in group stage
10	Philippines	5	1	1	3	2	13	−11	4	Eliminated in group stage
11	Timor-Leste	5	0	1	4	0	9	−9	1	Eliminated in group stage
12	Singapore	5	0	0	5	0	16	−16	0	Eliminated in group stage

Updated to match(es) played on unknown. Source:
