= Curien =

Curien may refer to:

- Hubert Curien (1924–2005), a French physicist and a key figure in European science politics
  - Hubert Curien Pluridisciplinary Institute
  - Hubert Curien Laboratory
- Kurian, also Curien, a Malayalam-language form of Cyriacus, used by Saint Thomas Christians in the Indian state of Kerala
  - Curien Kaniamparambil (1913–2015), a priest in the Jacobite Syrian Christian Church and a scholar in Syriac language
- Curien, a fictional family in The House of the Dead

== See also ==
- Curienne, a commune in France
