= Kurniawan =

Kurniawan is an Indonesian surname and given name. Notable people with the name include:

== Surname ==
- Achmad Kurniawan (born 1979), Indonesian footballer
- Agus Indra Kurniawan (born 1982), Indonesian professional footballer
- Arip Kurniawan (born 1987), Indonesian footballer
- Eddy Kurniawan (born 1962), Chinese-Indonesian male badminton player
- Edi Kurniawan (born 1988), Indonesian weightlifter
- Eka Kurniawan (born 1975), Indonesian writer
- Fran Kurniawan (born 1985), Indonesian badminton player
- Kim Kurniawan (born 1990), German born-Indonesian professional footballer
- Kusnul Yuli Kurniawan (born 1978), Indonesian footballer
- Rudy Hartono Kurniawan (born 1949), Indonesian badminton player
- Rudy Kurniawan (born 1976), Indonesian wine collector and convicted perpetrator of wine fraud

== Given name ==
- Kurniawan Karman (born 1991), Indonesian professional footballer
- Hendri Kurniawan Saputra (born 1981), Singaporean badminton player
- Andre Kurniawan Tedjono (born 1986), male Indonesian badminton player who specializes in singles
- Kurniawan Dwi Yulianto (born 1976), former Indonesian professional footballer

== See also ==
- Kurian
