= Anusak Laosangthai =

Thai footballer

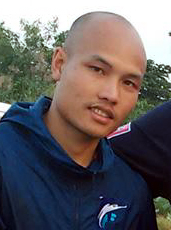

Personal information
- Full name: Anusak Laosangthai
- Date of birth: 5 January 1992 (age 34)
- Place of birth: Bangkok, Thailand
- Height: 1.69 m (5 ft 6 1/2 in)
- Position: Forward

Youth career
- 2007–2008: Assumption College Thonburi
- 2009: Rajpracha

Senior career*
Years	Team	Apps	(Gls)
2010–2015	Muangthong United	1	(0)
2010–2011	→ Air Force United (loan)	27	(12)
2012	→ Thai Port (loan)	7	(4)
2013	→ Nakhon Nayok (loan)	7	(1)
2013	→ Ayutthaya (loan)	12	(1)
2014	→ Phuket (loan)	18	(7)
2015–2016	Pattaya United	12	(2)
2015	→ Customs United (loan)	21	(4)
2017	BU Deffo	25	(23)
2018	Ayutthaya	3	(0)
2018	Chainat Hornbill	3	(0)
2019	Trang	13	(8)
2019	Air Force United	6	(2)
2020	Uthai Thani	2	(0)
2020	Songkhla	5	(0)
2021	Ranong United	13	(5)
2021–2022	Kasem Bundit University	22	(6)
2022	Kasetsart	1	(0)
2023–2024	Kasem Bundit University	23	(7)
2024	Trat	12	(1)

International career
2007–2008	Thailand U16		
2009–2010	Thailand U19	10	(6)
2012–2015	Thailand U23	3	(1)
Medal record
Thailand under-17
AFF U-16 Youth Championship
Winner	AFF U-17 Youth Championship 2007	Football
- * Club domestic league appearances and goals as of 23:36, 5 May 2017 (UTC)

Anusak Laosangthai (Thai: อนุศักดิ์ เหล่าแสงไทย, born January 5, 1992) is a Thai former professional footballer who plays as a forward.

== International career ==
He won the 2007 AFF U-17 Youth Championship with Thailand U17

=== International Goals ===
==== Under-16 ====
#	Date	Venue	Opponent	Score	Result	Competition
1.	23 August 2007	Olympic Stadium, Phnom Penh, Cambodia	Brunei	3-0	3-0	2007 AFF U-17 Youth Championship
2.	25 August 2007	Olympic Stadium, Phnom Penh, Cambodia	Malaysia	1-1	3-1	2007 AFF U-17 Youth Championship
3.	25 August 2007	Olympic Stadium, Phnom Penh, Cambodia	Malaysia	3-1	3-1	2007 AFF U-17 Youth Championship
4.	30 August 2007	Army Stadium, Phnom Penh, Cambodia	Vietnam	1-0	2-0	2007 AFF U-17 Youth Championship
5.	30 August 2007	Army Stadium, Phnom Penh, Cambodia	Vietnam	2-0	2-0	2007 AFF U-17 Youth Championship
6.	1 September 2007	Olympic Stadium, Phnom Penh, Cambodia	Laos	3-0	3-2	2007 AFF U-17 Youth Championship

== Honours ==
=== International ===
Thailand U-16

- AFF U-16 Youth Championship: 2007
