= Ngô Đức Hoàng =

Vietnamese footballer (born 2002)

Personal information
- Full name: Ngô Đức Hoàng
- Date of birth: 16 September 2002 (age 24)
- Place of birth: Diễn Châu, Nghệ An, Vietnam
- Height: 1.77 m (5 ft 10 in)
- Position: Defensive midfielder

Team information
- Current team: Thanh Hóa
- Number: 8

Youth career
- –2021: Hà Nội

Senior career*
Years	Team	Apps	(Gls)
2021–2026	Hà Nội	3	(0)
2021	→ Phù Đổng (loan)	6	(0)
2023–2024	→ PVF-CAND (loan)	20	(0)
2026	→ Đông Á Thanh Hóa (loan)	7	(0)
2026–	Thanh Hóa	1	(0)

International career^{‡}
2017–2018	Vietnam U16	11	(1)
2019–2020	Vietnam U19	3	(0)
Medal record
Men's football
Representing Vietnam
AFF U-23 Championship
Winner	Cambodia 2022	Team
- * Club domestic league appearances and goals as of 6 September 2026 ‡ National team caps and goals as of 20 April 2023

Ngô Đức Hoàng (born 16 September 2002) is a Vietnamese professional footballer who plays as a defensive midfielder for V.League 1 club Thanh Hóa.

== Early career ==
Đức Hoàng was a youth product of the Hà Nội FC youth academy. In 2019, Đức Hoàng's performances at the Vietnamese National U-19 Championship led Hà Nội to win the title, scoring a goal in course of the competition. Subsequently, he was named the player of the tournament.

== Club career ==
In 2022, Đức Hoàng was registered by Hà Nội in their squad for the 2022 V.League 1. On 13 September 2022, he made his V.League 1 debut as a substitute in a 1–1 draw against Sài Gòn.

In March 2023, Đức Hoàng was loaned to V.League 2 club PVF-CAND.

== International career ==
In 2022, Đức Hoàng was part of the Vietnam U23 winning team in the 2022 AFF U-23 Championship but did not appear in tournament because he was tested positive for COVID-19.

== Honours ==
Hà Nội

- V.League 1: 2022

Vietnam U15

- AFF U-15 Championship: 2017

Vietnam U19

- International Thanh Niên Newspaper Cup: 2019

Vietnam U23

- AFF U-23 Championship: 2022

Individual

- Vietnamese National U-19 Football Championship best player: 2019
