= Ryan Teague =

Australian soccer player

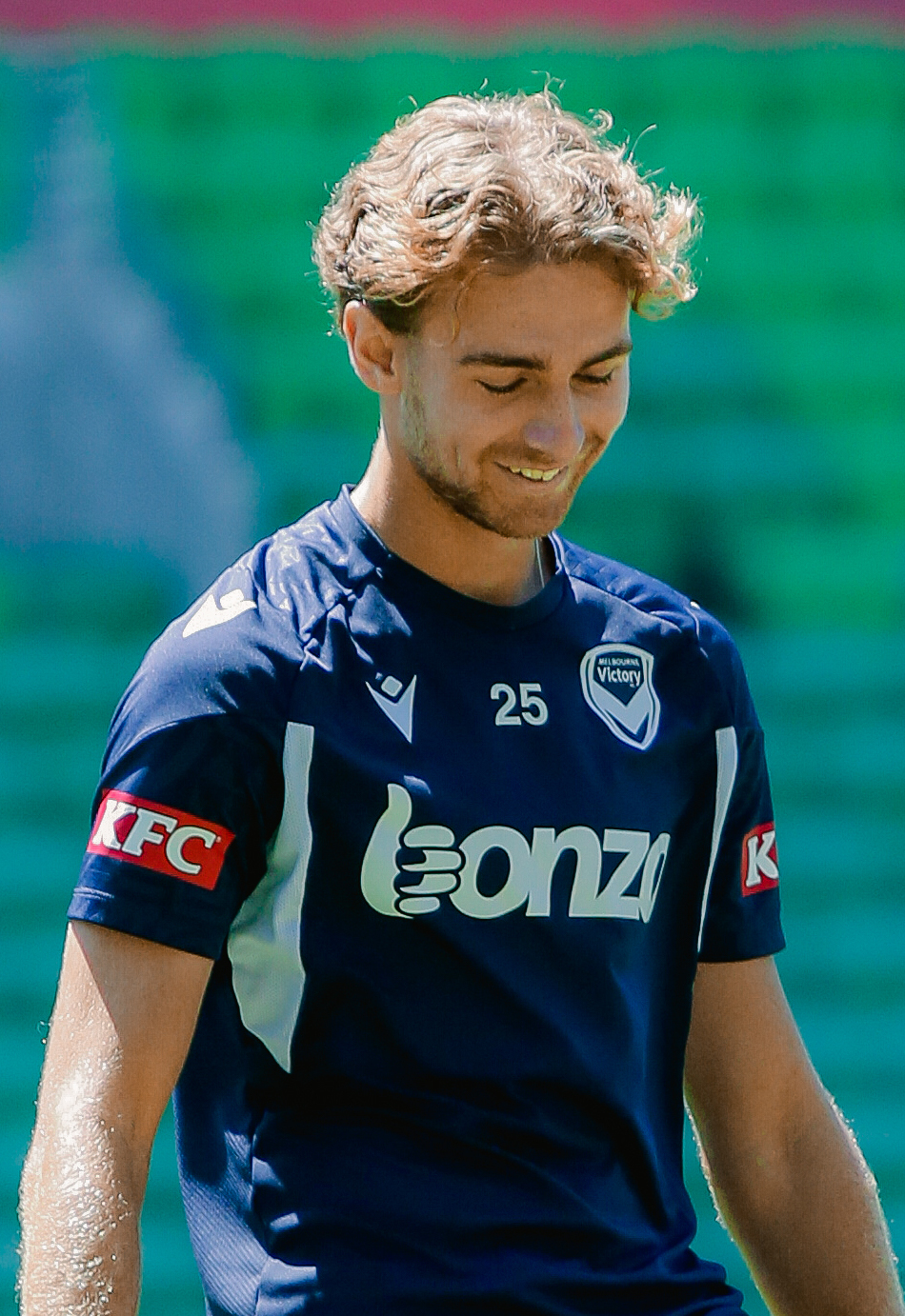
- Ryan Teague training with Melbourne Victory in 2023

Personal information
- Full name: Ryan Graham Pun Teague
- Date of birth: 24 January 2002 (age 24)
- Place of birth: Randwick, New South Wales, Australia
- Height: 1.82 m (6 ft 0 in)
- Position: Defensive midfielder

Team information
- Current team: Mechelen
- Number: 43

Youth career
- Maroubra United
- Sydney University
- Sydney Olympic
- Sydney FC

Senior career*
Years	Team	Apps	(Gls)
2019–2020	Sydney FC NPL	17	(1)
2019–2020	Sydney FC	1	(0)
2020–2023	Famalicão	0	(0)
2021–2022	→ Sporting da Covilhã (loan)	24	(0)
2023–2025	Melbourne Victory	54	(5)
2025–	Mechelen	4	(0)
2026	→ Melbourne City (loan)	9	(0)

International career^{‡}
2017–2019	Australia U17	24	(11)
2021–2025	Australia U23	13	(1)
2025–	Australia	4	(0)
Medal record
Men's football
Representing Australia
AFF U-16 Youth Championship
Third place	2017 Thailand	U-17 Team
- * Club domestic league appearances and goals as of 30 August 2025 ‡ National team caps and goals as of 12 September 2025

Ryan Graham Pun Teague (born 24 January 2002) is an Australian professional football player who plays as a defensive midfielder for Belgian Pro League club Mechelen and the Australia national team.

== Club career ==
=== Sydney FC ===
Teague joined Sydney FC's academy at its inception, and progressed through the youth ranks, before being awarded a scholarship in September 2018. In September 2019, along with Marco Tilio and Harry van der Saag, Teague was awarded a Hyundai A-League scholarship contract, and was promoted to the senior squad. On 7 December 2019, Teague made his professional debut, coming off the bench for Luke Brattan in the 82nd minute of a 5–1 win over Brisbane Roar at Jubilee Oval.

=== Famalicão ===
On 30 January 2020, Teague signed for Portuguese side Famalicão. He made his first team debut on 24 July 2021 in a 1–0 Taça da Liga win against Feirense.

==== Sporting da Covilhã (loan) ====
On 1 August 2021, Sporting da Covilhã announced the signing of Teague on a season long loan. His first appearance was in the Liga Portugal 2 game against Vilafranquense on 23 August 2021.

=== Melbourne Victory ===
On 13 September 2023, Teague returned to Australia, signing a three-year contract with A-League club Melbourne Victory.

=== K.V. Mechelen ===
On 1 July 2025, Teague signed for Belgian Pro League side K.V. Mechelen for an undisclosed fee.

== International career ==
Teague featured in the Joeys side from 2017 until the 2019 FIFA U-17 World Cup, where he captained the side to the round of 16, playing all 4 games, and culminating in a 4–0 defeat to France.

On 14 March 2025, Teague was called up by Tony Popovic ahead of Australia’s 2026 FIFA World Cup qualifying matches against Indonesia and China. On 25 March, he made his international debut starting the away match against China. Teague played 76 minutes in Australia’s 0-2 win.

Teague was reportedly eligible to represent China or Malaysia.

== Personal life ==
Born in Australia, Teague was raised in the Eastern suburbs of Sydney. He also attended Epping Boys High School in Marsfield, NSW.
