= Arip Kurniawan =

Indonesian footballer

Arip
Personal information
- Full name: Arip Kurniawan
- Date of birth: 5 March 1987 (age 39)
- Place of birth: Serang, Indonesia
- Height: 1.66 m (5 ft 5 1/2 in)
- Position: Striker

Senior career*
Years	Team	Apps	(Gls)
2006–2008	Perserang Serang	25	(3)
2008–2009	Persibo Bojonegoro	21	(2)
2009–2011	Persipasi Bekasi	35	(8)
2011–2012	PSAP Sigli	16	(1)
2012–2013	Persiraja Banda Aceh	16	(2)
2013	Persiba Balikpapan	12	(0)
2014	Kalteng Putra	19	(1)
2015–2019	PSCS Cilacap	37	(6)
- * Club domestic league appearances and goals

Arip Kurniawan (born March 5, 1987) is an Indonesian former footballer.

== Club statistics ==
Club	Season	Super League		Premier Division		Piala Indonesia		Total	
Club	Season	Apps	Goals	Apps	Goals	Apps	Goals	Apps	Goals
PSAP Sigli	2011-12	6	0	-		-		6	0
Total		6	0	-		-		6	0
