= Doni Grdić =

Australian soccer player

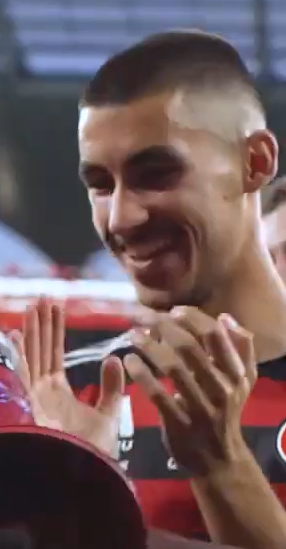
- Grdić with Western Sydney Wanderers in 2023

Personal information
- Date of birth: 22 January 2002 (age 24)
- Place of birth: Šibenik, Croatia
- Height: 1.90 m (6 ft 3 in)
- Position: Central defender

Team information
- Current team: Strathmore Split
- Number: 13

Youth career
- –2019: Šibenik

Senior career*
Years	Team	Apps	(Gls)
2019–2023	Šibenik	11	(0)
2022–2023	→ BSK Bijelo Brdo (loan)	13	(0)
2023–2024	Western Sydney Wanderers	1	(0)
2024–2025	Rudar Velenje	10	(0)
2025	Sydney Olympic	20	(0)
2025	Dandenong City	6	(0)
2026–	Strathmore Split	2	(1)

International career
2019–2020	Australia U17	2	(0)
2020	Australia U20	1	(0)
- * Club domestic league appearances and goals as of 5 May 2026

Doni Grdić (born 22 January 2002) is an Australian professional soccer player. Born in Croatia, he has represented Australia at youth level.

== Club career ==
Grdić started his career with Croatian top flight side Šibenik.

In July 2023, Grdić joined Australian club Western Sydney Wanderers on a one-year contract. After leaving the Wanderers after making just one league appearance and three appearances in all competitions, Grdić signed for Slovenian side Rudar Velenje.

In 2025, Grdić joined Sydney Olympic in the NPL NSW.

== International career ==
Grdić has played for the Australia national U-17 and U-20 teams through his father, former Australian soccer player Anthony Grdic. He remains available to represent for the senior team of either Croatia or Australia.

In May 2021, he was called to the Olyroos by manager Graham Arnold in a string of friendlies preparing for the 2020 Summer Olympics, but was unused in all three friendlies as Australia were edged both by Ireland, Romania and Mexico. He was not included into the final squad of the Olyroos.
