= Pangnasith Phettikone =

Laotian footballer

Pangnasith Phettikone (born 24 September 1992) is a Laotian football player. He is a member of Laos national football team.
