= Joshua Varga =

Australian soccer player

Personal information
- Full name: Joshua Varga
- Date of birth: 7 February 2002 (age 24)
- Place of birth: Noble Park, Victoria, Australia
- Height: 1.70 m (5 ft 7 in)
- Position: Midfielder

Team information
- Current team: Langwarrin

Youth career
- Knox United
- Nunawading City
- 2017–2018: Melbourne City

Senior career*
Years	Team	Apps	(Gls)
2018–2019	Melbourne City NPL	28	(2)
2019–2021	Melbourne Victory	1	(0)
2021	Melbourne Victory NPL	14	(1)
2022	Nunawading City	18	(4)
2023–	Langwarrin	0	(0)

International career^{‡}
2017–2019	Australia U17	14	(2)
Medal record
Men's football
Representing Australia
AFF U-16 Youth Championship
Third place	2017 Thailand	U-17 Team
- * Club domestic league appearances and goals as of 8 September 2021 ‡ National team caps and goals as of 15 September 2020

Joshua Varga (born 7 February 2002), is an Australian soccer player who plays as a midfielder for Langwarrin SC. Varga previously played in the A-League Men for Melbourne Victory.
