= P. V. Kurian =

Indian revolutionary and social activist

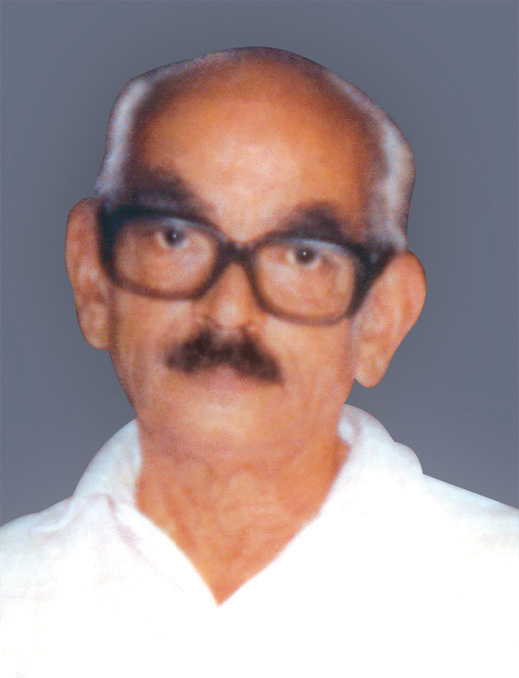
P. V. Kurian

P. V. Kurian (1921–1993) was an Indian revolutionary and social activist under the British Raj.

== Biography ==
An eminent freedom fighter, Socialist thinker and activist and a close associate of Dr. Ram Manohar Lohia, Kurian came to the freedom movement by joining Congress in 1938. Later he became the joint secretary of the Travancore branch of All India Forward Bloc, founded by Subhas Chandra Bose.

After Bose left India, Mr. Kurian joined Congress Socialist Party and became closely associated with Dr. Ram Manohar Lohia. After Lohia's death in 1967, Mr. Kurian founded Lohia Study Centre at Thiruvananthapuram, which was later renamed as Lohia Vichāra Vedi. He used to write in Socialist journals in Malayalam such as Swathanthra Bhāratham, Kerala Nādu, Pōrāttam, Māttam, and Samājavādi.

A major contribution of Mr. Kurian is his voluminous book on Lohia: Dr. Ram Manohar Lohia Enna Sārvadeśeeya Viplavakari (Malayalam), pages 2210.
