= Giang Trần Quách Tân =

Vietnamese footballer (born 1992)

Personal information
- Full name: Giang Trần Quách Tân
- Date of birth: March 8, 1992 (age 34)
- Place of birth: Cẩm Lệ, Đà Nẵng, Vietnam
- Height: 1.75 m (5 ft 9 in)
- Position: Winger

Youth career
- 2003–2012: SHB Đà Nẵng

Senior career*
Years	Team	Apps	(Gls)
2013–2016	SHB Đà Nẵng	23	(1)
2017–2020	Than Quảng Ninh	60	(9)
2021–2022	Hồng Lĩnh Hà Tĩnh	19	(1)
2023–2025	SHB Đà Nẵng	34	(1)

International career^{‡}
2012–2013	Vietnam U21	2	(0)
2013–2014	Vietnam U23	3	(1)
2014–2015	Vietnam	1	(0)
- * Club domestic league appearances and goals as of 15 June 2025 ‡ National team caps and goals as of 17 January 2015

Giang Trần Quách Tân (born 8 March 1992) is a Vietnamese professional footballer who last played as a winger for V.League 1 club SHB Đà Nẵng.

== Honours ==
SHB Đà Nẵng

- V.League 2: 2023–24
