= Kurian =

Kurian (also spelled Kurien) is a Saint Thomas Christians and Syrian Christian name of Syriac Aramaic origin or Greek origin, presumed to have originated from the name Quriaqos (ܩܘܪܝܩܘܣ) or the Greek Kyrios or kurios (Ancient Greek: κύριος) meaning Lord, master, power or authority, and is very popular among Kerala Christians both as a first name and as a surname. The ancient Roman name 'Cyriacus' is considered the equivalent of the Greek 'Kyriakos' or the Syriac Aramaic name Quriaqos (ܩܘܪܝܩܘܣ) that means "Of the Lord".

Popular Syrian Christian variants of this name include Kuriakose, Cyriac and Kurian.

== Notable Kurians ==
- Ajish Oommen Kurian, Indian entrepreneur
- A. K. Antony, Indian politician and attorney who was the 23rd Defence Minister of India
- C. A. Kurian, CPI State Executive Committee
- C.T. Kurien, a retired professor of economics
- Diana Mariam Kurian, known as Nayanthara, an Indian movie actress
- George Kurian, CEO of NetApp
- George Thomas Kurian, Indian-American historian and encyclopedist
- Job Kurian, singer and music composer
- Kurien Thomas, a Pentecostal missionary to Central India
- Mar Dionysius III, who was born Kurien,
- P. J. Kurien, an Indian politician, member of parliament, social worker and educationalist who is the Deputy Chairman of the Rajya Sabha
- P.K. Kurien, Retd Senior Editor with 'The Hindu'
- P. V. Kurian, Indian social activist
- Prema Kurien, a professor of sociology at the Syracuse University
- Shruti Kurien-Kanetkar, an Indian badminton player
- Thomas Kurian, CEO Google Cloud and former President of Oracle Corporation
- V. J. Kurian IAS, managing director, Cochin International Airport Limited
- Verghese Kurien, social entrepreneur
- Noble K Kurian, famous biotechnology researcher and entrepreneur
- Bless B Kurian, an important MCYM figure

== See also ==
- Kurien
- Syrian Christians
