= Lachlan Sepping =

Australian footballer (born 2002)

Personal information
- Date of birth: 28 May 2002 (age 24)
- Place of birth: St Clair, New South Wales, Australia
- Position: Midfielder

Team information
- Current team: Sydney Olympic

Youth career
- Marconi Stallions

Senior career*
Years	Team	Apps	(Gls)
2018–2021	Marconi Stallions	16	(3)
2021–2022	Macarthur FC	0	(0)
2021–2022	→ Northbridge Bulls (loan)	30	(3)
2022–2023	APEA Akrotiri	0	(0)
2023–2024	Nepean FC	27	(16)
2024–2026	Hills United	57	(10)
2026–	Sydney Olympic	0	(0)

International career^{‡}
2017–2018	Australia U17	11	(2)
- * Club domestic league appearances and goals as of 5 June 2026 ‡ National team caps and goals as of 9 December 2021

Lachlan Sepping (born 28 May 2002) is an Australian professional footballer who plays as a midfielder for NSW League One club Sydney Olympic. Born in Sydney, Sepping previously played in Cyprus for APEA Akrotiri from July 2022, departing at the end of his contract in February 2023.
