= George Antonis =

Australian footballer

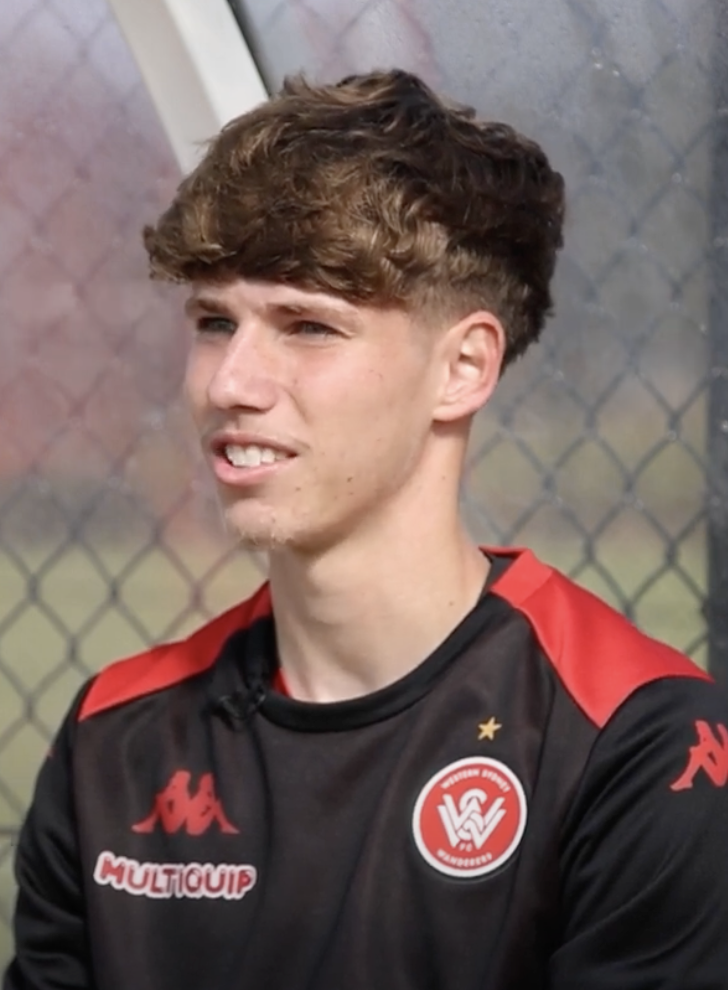
- George Antonis with Western Sydney Wanderers in 2022

Personal information
- Date of birth: 20 August 2002 (age 24)
- Place of birth: Bankstown, Australia
- Position: Midfielder

Team information
- Current team: Sydney Olympic
- Number: 29

Youth career
- 2013–2015: Sydney United
- 2015–2021: Western Sydney Wanderers

Senior career*
Years	Team	Apps	(Gls)
2020–2023	Western Sydney Wanderers NPL	57	(3)
2023–2024	Western Sydney Wanderers	0	(0)
2024–	Sydney Olympic	1	(0)
- * Club domestic league appearances and goals as of 20 February 2024

George Antonis (born 20 August 2002) is an Australian professional footballer who plays as a midfielder for National Premier Leagues NSW club Sydney Olympic.

== Early life ==
Antonis was born on 20 August 2002 in Bankstown, New South Wales to Anna and Peter Antonis. The youngest of three children, he has an older brother, Terry Antonis, and an older sister, Dimity Antonis. Terry became a professional footballer and started his career for Sydney FC in July 2010. His family, who is of Greek descent, resided in Georges Hall.

Like his siblings, Antonis took interest in football from an early age and began playing for South-West Strikers at the age of five. He also participated in futsal for Inner West Magic. Antonis initiated his career with Sydney United in their under-12s. He credits his development to his older brother and idolised Neymar growing up. He supports Premier League club Arsenal.

== Career ==
=== Western Sydney Wanderers ===
Antonis joined Western Sydney Wanderers Youth in late-2015 prior to their inception into the National Premier Leagues. After eight years with the youth, where he was named captain, Antonis signed on a one-year scholarship contract with the Wanderers on 28 June 2023. However, on 18 January 2024, Antonis had his contract terminated by the club through mutual agreement, and was announced on the same day to have signed with Sydney Olympic.
