= A-League transfers for 2019–20 season =

Australian soccer player transfers

This is a list of Australian soccer transfers for the 2019–20 A-League. Only moves featuring at least one A-League club are listed.

Clubs were able to sign players at any time, but many transfers will only officially go through on 1 June because the majority of player contracts finish on 31 May.

== Transfers ==
All players without a flag are Australian. Clubs without a flag are clubs participating in the A-League.

=== Pre-season ===
Date	Name	Moving from	Moving to
1 February 2019	(Greece) Panagiotis Kone	Unattached	Western United
1 February 2019	Matthew Millar	Central Coast Mariners	Newcastle Jets
12 February 2019	Josh Risdon	Western Sydney Wanderers	Western United
7 March 2019	Connor Chapman	Unattached	Western United
12 March 2019	Aaron Calver	Sydney FC	Western United
12 March 2019	Mark Bridge	Western Sydney Wanderers	(Australia) Mounties Wanderers
20 March 2019	Sebastian Pasquali	(Netherlands) Jong Ajax	Western United
20 March 2019	Dylan Pierias	Melbourne City	Western United
20 March 2019	Apostolos Stamatelopoulos	Adelaide United	Western United
22 March 2019	(Uruguay) Bruno Fornaroli	Unattached	Perth Glory
25 March 2019	Valentino Yuel	(Australia) Bentleigh Greens	Western United
4 April 2019	Brendon Santalab	Perth Glory	Retired
12 April 2019	Carl Valeri	Melbourne Victory	Retired
15 April 2019	Jonathan Aspropotamitis	Central Coast Mariners	Western United
15 April 2019	Joshua Cavallo	Melbourne City	Western United
15 April 2019	Connor Pain	Central Coast Mariners	Western United
15 April 2019	Alex Brosque	Sydney FC	Retired
17 April 2019	Matt McKay	Brisbane Roar	Retired
21 April 2019	(Brazil) Henrique	Brisbane Roar	Unattached
24 April 2019	(Venezuela) Ronald Vargas	Newcastle Jets	Unattached
24 April 2019	(Brazil) Jair	Newcastle Jets	Unattached
24 April 2019	Nick Cowburn	Newcastle Jets	Unattached
24 April 2019	Jake Adelson	Newcastle Jets	Unattached
27 April 2019	(Spain) Oriol Riera	Western Sydney Wanderers	Unattached
27 April 2019	(Denmark) Thomas Kristensen	Brisbane Roar	Unattached
29 April 2019	(Curaçao) Roly Bonevacia	Western Sydney Wanderers	Unattached
30 April 2019	Brett Holman	Brisbane Roar	Unattached
30 April 2019	(France) Éric Bauthéac	Brisbane Roar	Unattached
30 April 2019	(Spain) Álex López	Brisbane Roar	Unattached
30 April 2019	(Denmark) Tobias Mikkelsen	Brisbane Roar	Unattached
30 April 2019	Joe Caletti	Brisbane Roar	Unattached
30 April 2019	Eli Babalj	Brisbane Roar	Unattached
30 April 2019	Charles Lokolingoy	Brisbane Roar	Unattached
30 April 2019	Stefan Nigro	Brisbane Roar	Unattached
30 April 2019	Brendan White	Brisbane Roar	Unattached
1 May 2019	(England) Sam Graham	Central Coast Mariners	(England) Sheffield United (loan return)
1 May 2019	(Republic of Ireland) Stephen Mallon	Central Coast Mariners	(England) Sheffield United (loan return)
2 May 2019	(North Macedonia) Daniel Georgievski	Newcastle Jets	Western Sydney Wanderers
3 May 2019	(Japan) Keisuke Honda	Melbourne Victory	Unattached
3 May 2019	(Spain) Raúl Llorente	Western Sydney Wanderers	Unattached
3 May 2019	Marc Tokich	Western Sydney Wanderers	Unattached
3 May 2019	Rashid Mahazi	Western Sydney Wanderers	Unattached
3 May 2019	John Roberts	Western Sydney Wanderers	Unattached
3 May 2019	Scott Galloway	Adelaide United	Melbourne City
7 May 2019	(Turkey) Ersan Gülüm	(Australia) Whittlesea United	Western United
8 May 2019	Scott McDonald	Unattached	Western United
8 May 2019	Eugene Galekovic	Melbourne City	Retired
8 May 2019	Dean Bouzanis	(Netherlands) PEC Zwolle	Melbourne City (loan return)
8 May 2019	Denis Genreau	(Netherlands) PEC Zwolle	Melbourne City (loan return)
8 May 2019	(Belgium) Ritchie De Laet	Melbourne City	(England) Aston Villa (loan return)
8 May 2019	(England) Shayon Harrison	Melbourne City	(England) Tottenham Hotspur (loan return)
8 May 2019	Riley McGree	Melbourne City	(Belgium) Club Brugge (loan return)
8 May 2019	Peter Kekeris	Central Coast Mariners	Unattached
9 May 2019	James Delianov	Melbourne City	Western United
9 May 2019	(Italy) Iacopo La Rocca	Melbourne City	Unattached
13 May 2019	(Spain) Mandi	Wellington Phoenix	Unattached
13 May 2019	Antony Golec	Wellington Phoenix	Unattached
14 May 2019	(Poland) Filip Kurto	Wellington Phoenix	Western United
15 May 2019	Brendan Hamill	Western Sydney Wanderers	Western United
15 May 2019	(Switzerland) Pirmin Schwegler	(Germany) Hannover 96	Western Sydney Wanderers
15 May 2019	(Senegal) Baba Diawara	Adelaide United	Unattached
15 May 2019	(Netherlands) Jordy Thomassen	Adelaide United	(Netherlands) De Graafschap (loan return)
16 May 2019	Max Burgess	Wellington Phoenix	Western United
18 May 2019	(Denmark) Ken Ilsø	Adelaide United	Unattached
20 May 2019	Nathan Burns	Wellington Phoenix	Unattached
20 May 2019	(Poland) Michał Kopczyński	Wellington Phoenix	(Poland) Legia Warsaw (loan return)
20 May 2019	(New Zealand) Justin Gulley	Wellington Phoenix	Unattached
20 May 2019	(Republic of Ireland) Cillian Sheridan	Wellington Phoenix	Unattached
20 May 2019	Ryan Lowry	Wellington Phoenix	Unattached
22 May 2019	Giancarlo Gallifuoco	Western Sydney Wanderers	Central Coast Mariners
22 May 2019	(Netherlands) Tom Hiariej	Central Coast Mariners	Unattached
22 May 2019	Corey Gameiro	Central Coast Mariners	Unattached
22 May 2019	Joe Gauci	Central Coast Mariners	Unattached
23 May 2019	(Switzerland) Daniel Lopar	(Switzerland) St. Gallen	Western Sydney Wanderers
23 May 2019	(Portugal) Fábio Ferreira	Perth Glory	Unattached
23 May 2019	Jacob Italiano	Perth Glory	(Germany) Borussia Mönchengladbach
27 May 2019	(Fiji) Roy Krishna	Wellington Phoenix	Unattached
27 May 2019	(Spain) Isaías	Adelaide United	Unattached
27 May 2019	Alex Cisak	Sydney FC	Unattached
27 May 2019	Mitch Austin	Sydney FC	Unattached
27 May 2019	(Netherlands) Siem de Jong	Sydney FC	(Netherlands) Ajax (loan return)
27 May 2019	Daniel De Silva	Sydney FC	Central Coast Mariners (loan return)
27 May 2019	(Iran) Reza Ghoochannejhad	Sydney FC	(Cyprus) APOEL FC (loan return)
28 May 2019	(Spain) Raúl Baena	Melbourne Victory	(Spain) Granada (loan return)
28 May 2019	(Germany) Georg Niedermeier	Melbourne Victory	Unattached
29 May 2019	Ruon Tongyik	Brisbane Roar	Central Coast Mariners
31 May 2019	Andrew Hoole	Central Coast Mariners	(Australia) Broadmeadow Magic
3 June 2019	Dario Vidosic	Melbourne City	Unattached
4 June 2019	Jay Barnett	Brisbane Roar	Melbourne Victory
4 June 2019	Rahmat Akbari	Melbourne Victory	Brisbane Roar (loan return)
4 June 2019	Daniel Stynes	Perth Glory	(Australia) Bentleigh Greens
6 June 2019	(New Zealand) Stefan Marinovic	Unattached	Wellington Phoenix
6 June 2019	(New Zealand) Kosta Barbarouses	Melbourne Victory	Sydney FC
6 June 2019	Daniel Leck	Brisbane Roar	(Australia) Pascoe Vale
6 June 2019	Jerry Skotadis	Sydney FC	(Australia) Sutherland Sharks
7 June 2019	Walter Scott	Perth Glory	Wellington Phoenix
10 June 2019	David Williams	Wellington Phoenix	Unattached
11 June 2019	(New Zealand) Andrew Durante	Wellington Phoenix	Western United
12 June 2019	Jaushua Sotirio	Western Sydney Wanderers	Wellington Phoenix
14 June 2019	(Poland) Radosław Majewski	(Poland) Pogoń Szczecin	Western Sydney Wanderers
17 June 2019	(England) Craig Noone	(England) Bolton Wanderers	Melbourne City
17 June 2019	Luke DeVere	Brisbane Roar	Wellington Phoenix
17 June 2019	(New Zealand) Tom Doyle	Wellington Phoenix	Unattached
18 June 2019	Nick Fitzgerald	Western Sydney Wanderers	Newcastle Jets
19 June 2019	Jason Davidson	Perth Glory	(South Korea) Ulsan Hyundai
19 June 2019	Dylan McGowan	Unattached	Western Sydney Wanderers
21 June 2019	(Turkey) Jem Karacan	Central Coast Mariners	Unattached
21 June 2019	Ben Kennedy	Central Coast Mariners	Unattached
21 June 2019	Aiden O'Neill	Central Coast Mariners	(England) Burnley (loan return)
21 June 2019	(New Zealand) Jai Ingham	Melbourne Victory	Central Coast Mariners
21 June 2019	Abraham Majok	Western Sydney Wanderers	Central Coast Mariners
21 June 2019	Samuel Silvera	Western Sydney Wanderers	Central Coast Mariners
23 June 2019	Ivan Vujica	Newcastle Jets	Western United
24 June 2019	Nicholas D'Agostino	Brisbane Roar	Perth Glory
24 June 2019	(Republic of Ireland) Roy O'Donovan	Newcastle Jets	Brisbane Roar
24 June 2019	(Panama) Abdiel Arroyo	(Panama) Árabe Unido	Newcastle Jets (loan)
24 June 2019	(Netherlands) Jop van der Linden	Sydney FC	Retired
25 June 2019	(Scotland) Tom Aldred	Unattached	Brisbane Roar
25 June 2019	(Wales) Aaron Amadi-Holloway	(England) Shrewsbury Town	Brisbane Roar
25 June 2019	(England) Macaulay Gillesphey	Unattached	Brisbane Roar
25 June 2019	(New Zealand) Dane Ingham	Brisbane Roar	Perth Glory
26 June 2019	(New Zealand) Callum McCowatt	(New Zealand) Eastern Suburbs	Wellington Phoenix
26 June 2019	Jake McGing	Unattached	Brisbane Roar
26 June 2019	George Mells	Unattached	Brisbane Roar
27 June 2019	Brad Inman	Unattached	Brisbane Roar
27 June 2019	Aiden O'Neill	(England) Burnley	Brisbane Roar (loan)
28 June 2019	(Scotland) Ziggy Gordon	Unattached	Central Coast Mariners
28 June 2019	(Austria) Richard Windbichler	Unattached	Melbourne City
28 June 2019	(Republic of Ireland) Jay O'Shea	Unattached	Brisbane Roar
30 June 2019	Scott Neville	Perth Glory	Brisbane Roar
1 July 2019	(New Zealand) Sarpreet Singh	Wellington Phoenix	(Germany) Bayern Munich II
1 July 2019	Jacob Tratt	Sydney FC	Perth Glory
2 July 2019	(Germany) Alexander Baumjohann	Western Sydney Wanderers	Sydney FC
2 July 2019	(Netherlands) Bart Schenkeveld	Melbourne City	Unattached
2 July 2019	Kearyn Baccus	Melbourne City	(South Africa) Kaizer Chiefs
3 July 2019	Ryan McGowan	Unattached	Sydney FC
4 July 2019	Cameron Devlin	Sydney FC	Wellington Phoenix
5 July 2019	(Mexico) Ulises Dávila	Unattached	Wellington Phoenix
5 July 2019	Riley McGree	(Belgium) Club Brugge	Adelaide United
8 July 2019	Joshua Brillante	Sydney FC	Melbourne City
9 July 2019	(Uruguay) Javier Cabrera	Unattached	Melbourne City
9 July 2019	Liam McGing	(Australia) Sutherland Sharks	Wellington Phoenix
12 July 2019	(England) David Ball	(England) Rotherham United	Wellington Phoenix
17 July 2019	Craig Goodwin	Adelaide United	(Saudi Arabia) Al-Wehda
18 July 2019	(Curaçao) Michaël Maria	(United States) Charlotte Independence	Adelaide United
18 July 2019	(New Zealand) Te Atawhai Hudson-Wihongi	(New Zealand) Auckland City	Wellington Phoenix
18 July 2019	(New Zealand) Max Crocombe	(England) Salford City	Brisbane Roar
19 July 2019	(New Zealand) Tim Payne	(New Zealand) Eastern Suburbs	Wellington Phoenix
19 July 2019	(Uruguay) Adrián Luna	Unattached	Melbourne City
19 July 2019	Luke Brattan	Melbourne City	Sydney FC
22 July 2019	Patrick Flottmann	(Thailand) Air Force United	Sydney FC
23 July 2019	Robbie Kruse	Unattached	Melbourne Victory
23 July 2019	Terry Antonis	Melbourne Victory	(South Korea) Suwon Samsung Bluewings
24 July 2019	(Italy) Alessandro Diamanti	Unattached	Western United
25 July 2019	Andrew Nabbout	(Japan) Urawa Red Diamonds	Melbourne Victory
30 July 2019	(South Korea) Kim Soo-beom	(South Korea) Jeju United	Perth Glory
31 July 2019	(Norway) Kristian Opseth	Unattached	Adelaide United
31 July 2019	(Republic of Ireland) Andy Keogh	Perth Glory	(Saudi Arabia) Al-Qadsiah
1 August 2019	(New Zealand) Jai Ingham	Central Coast Mariners	Brisbane Roar
1 August 2019	Mark Birighitti	Melbourne City	Central Coast Mariners
2 August 2019	(South Korea) Kim Eun-sun	Unattached	Central Coast Mariners
5 August 2019	Nick Sullivan	Unattached	Western Sydney Wanderers
6 August 2019	Osama Malik	(Saudi Arabia) Al-Batin	Perth Glory
6 August 2019	Tom Glover	Unattached	Melbourne City
8 August 2019	Shane Lowry	Perth Glory	(Qatar) Al Ahli
8 August 2019	(Serbia) Milan Đurić	Unattached	Central Coast Mariners
9 August 2019	(Germany) Matti Steinmann	Unattached	Wellington Phoenix
9 August 2019	(Republic of Ireland) Wes Hoolahan	Unattached	Newcastle Jets
14 August 2019	Joe Champness	Newcastle Jets	Unattached
16 August 2019	(Germany) Tim Hoogland	(Germany) VfL Bochum	Melbourne Victory
18 August 2019	Reno Piscopo	(Italy) Renate	Wellington Phoenix
20 August 2019	(Austria) Kristijan Dobras	Unattached	Melbourne Victory
21 August 2019	Dylan Fox	Unattached	Central Coast Mariners
28 August 2019	(New Zealand) Gianni Stensness	Wellington Phoenix	Central Coast Mariners
2 September 2019	(Denmark) Jakob Poulsen	(Denmark) Midtjylland	Melbourne Victory
2 September 2019	Thiel Iradukunda	Unattached	Western United
6 September 2019	Matthew Jurman	Unattached	Western Sydney Wanderers
9 September 2019	Joe Gauci	(Australia) Adelaide City	Melbourne City
9 September 2019	Kerrin Stokes	(Australia) Croydon Kings	Melbourne City
10 September 2019	(Croatia) Dario Jertec	Unattached	Western United
12 September 2019	(Ivory Coast) Adama Traoré	Unattached	Melbourne Victory
18 September 2019	(Northern Ireland) Bobby Burns	(Scotland) Heart of Midlothian	Newcastle Jets (loan)
18 September 2019	(Switzerland) Gregory Wüthrich	(Switzerland) Young Boys	Perth Glory
19 September 2019	(Albania) Migjen Basha	(Greece) Aris Thessaloniki	Melbourne Victory
19 September 2019	(Germany) Alexander Meier	Unattached	Western Sydney Wanderers
24 September 2019	Luke Duzel	Melbourne City	Western United
27 September 2019	James Meredith	Unattached	Perth Glory
27 September 2019	(Kosovo) Besart Berisha	Unattached	Western United
2 October 2019	Riley Warland	(England) Fulham	Perth Glory
5 October 2019	James Troisi	Melbourne Victory	Adelaide United
10 October 2019	Matthew Spiranovic	Perth Glory	Unattached

=== Mid-season ===
Date	Name	Moving from	Moving to
14 October 2019	Kwabena Appiah	Newcastle Jets	Western United
15 October 2019	John Roberts	Unattached	Central Coast Mariners
15 October 2019	(China) Chen Yongbin	(China) Qingdao Red Lions	Adelaide United
16 October 2019	(Germany) Nicolai Müller	(Germany) Eintracht Frankfurt	Western Sydney Wanderers
17 October 2019	(England) Gary Hooper	Unattached	Wellington Phoenix
31 October 2019	Brendan White	(Australia) Heidelberg United	Melbourne Victory
7 November 2019	Bernardo Oliveira	(Australia) FFSA NTC	Melbourne City
8 November 2019	Ryan Scott	(Australia) Bentleigh Greens	Western United
18 November 2019	(Brazil) Jair	Unattached	Central Coast Mariners
25 November 2019	Danijel Nizic	Western Sydney Wanderers	Unattached
29 December 2019	Connor Chapman	Western United	(South Korea) Daejeon Citizen
2 January 2020	Oskar Dillon	(Australia) Gold Coast Knights	Western United
6 January 2020	Brandon Wilson	Perth Glory	Wellington Phoenix
12 January 2020	(Uruguay) Javier Cabrera	Melbourne City	Unattached
13 January 2020	Brandon O'Neill	Sydney FC	(South Korea) Pohang Steelers
16 January 2020	(Spain) Markel Susaeta	Unattached	Melbourne City
16 January 2020	(Germany) Alexander Meier	Western Sydney Wanderers	Unattached
16 January 2020	(Republic of Ireland) Simon Cox	(England) Southend United	Western Sydney Wanderers
17 January 2020	Corey Brown	Melbourne Victory	Brisbane Roar
17 January 2020	Scott McDonald	Western United	Brisbane Roar
21 January 2020	Vince Lia	Adelaide United	Perth Glory
22 January 2020	(Scotland) Jack Hendry	(Scotland) Celtic	Melbourne City (loan)
22 January 2020	(Turkey) Ersan Gülüm	Western United	Unattached
22 January 2020	Daniel Margush	Adelaide United	Perth Glory
22 January 2020	Riley Warland	Perth Glory	Unattached
22 January 2020	(Austria) Kristijan Dobras	Melbourne Victory	Unattached
22 January 2020	(New Zealand) Marco Rojas	Unattached	Melbourne Victory
23 January 2020	Tomi Uskok	(Australia) Sydney United	Western United
26 January 2020	Connor O'Toole	Brisbane Roar	Newcastle Jets
28 January 2020	Tarek Elrich	Western Sydney Wanderers	Perth Glory
28 January 2020	Thomas Deng	Melbourne Victory	(Japan) Urawa Red Diamonds
30 January 2020	Ryan Teague	Sydney FC	(Portugal) Famalicão
30 January 2020	Stefan Mauk	Brisbane Roar	Adelaide United
31 January 2020	Chris Harold	Perth Glory	Central Coast Mariners
31 January 2020	(Republic of Ireland) Roy O'Donovan	Brisbane Roar	Newcastle Jets
3 February 2020	Giancarlo Gallifuoco	Central Coast Mariners	Melbourne Victory
5 February 2020	Carlo Armiento	Adelaide United	Perth Glory
11 February 2020	(Japan) Tomoki Imai	Unattached	Western United
20 February 2020	Brendan White	Melbourne Victory	Unattached
21 February 2020	Steven Lustica	Unattached	Western United
24 February 2020	Bernie Ibini	Unattached	Newcastle Jets
25 February 2020	(Wales) Joe Ledley	Unattached	Newcastle Jets
7 March 2020	Jacob Pepper	Brisbane Roar	(Indonesia) Madura United
17 March 2020	Abraham Majok	Central Coast Mariners	Unattached
17 March 2020	Mario Shabow	Central Coast Mariners	Unattached
5 April 2020	(Northern Ireland) Bobby Burns	Newcastle Jets	(Scotland) Heart of Midlothian (end of loan)
7 April 2020	(Croatia) Dario Jertec	Western United	Unattached
6 May 2020	(Denmark) Jakob Poulsen	Melbourne Victory	Retired
4 June 2020	(Sweden) Ola Toivonen	Melbourne Victory	Unattached
6 June 2020	(Switzerland) Gregory Wüthrich	Perth Glory	Unattached
18 June 2020	(England) Kaine Sheppard	Newcastle Jets	Unattached
18 June 2020	(New Zealand) Glen Moss	Newcastle Jets	Retired
18 June 2020	(Curaçao) Michaël Maria	Adelaide United	Unattached
19 June 2020	(South Korea) Kim Eun-sun	Central Coast Mariners	Unattached
25 June 2020	(South Korea) Kim Soo-beom	Perth Glory	(South Korea) Gangwon FC
26 June 2020	(Republic of Ireland) Wes Hoolahan	Newcastle Jets	Unattached
2 July 2020	Tristan Prendergast	Unattached	Western Sydney Wanderers
6 July 2020	Isaac Richards	Adelaide United	Unattached
7 July 2020	Aiden O'Neill	Brisbane Roar	(England) Burnley (end of loan)
8 July 2020	(Germany) Mirko Boland	Adelaide United	(Germany) VfB Lübeck
13 July 2020	(Greece) Panagiotis Kone	Western United	Unattached
14 July 2020	(Scotland) Jack Hendry	Melbourne City	(Scotland) Celtic (end of loan)
14 July 2020	(Spain) Markel Susaeta	Melbourne City	Unattached
15 July 2020	(Germany) Tim Hoogland	Melbourne Victory	Unattached
16 July 2020	Danny Kim	(Australia) Lions FC	Brisbane Roar (loan)
16 July 2020	(New Zealand) Matthew Ridenton	Newcastle Jets	Brisbane Roar
16 July 2020	(England) Thomas James	(Australia) Wollongong Wolves	Perth Glory
16 July 2020	Yianni Perkatis	(Australia) Sydney United	Perth Glory
17 July 2020	Patick Antelmi	(Australia) Sydney United	Western United
17 July 2020	Nicolas Milanovic	Western Sydney Wanderers	Western United
20 July 2020	Michael Neill	(Australia) Rockdale City Suns	Newcastle Jets
25 July 2020	Dean Bouzanis	Melbourne City	Unattached
26 July 2020	Lawrence Thomas	Melbourne Victory	(Denmark) SønderjyskE
22 August 2020	(England) Thomas James	Perth Glory	(Australia) Wollongong Wolves

Player was released to free agency before joining new club
Brattan returned from loan to his parent club Manchester City who released him before joining Sydney FC
