= United (docuseries) =

Network Ten and Amazon Prime Video sports docuseries

- Genre: Sports documentary
- Directed by: Dan Jones
- Starring: Western United Football Club
- No. of seasons: 1
- No. of episodes: 6

Production
- Executive producers: Silvio Salum; Vasili Papanicolou
- Producer: Michael O'Neil
- Production locations: Melbourne, Australia
- Running time: 46 minutes

Original release
- Network: DocPlay
- Release: 7 December 2022

United is an association football docuseries aired on DocPlay. In the series, Australian A-League Men side Western United's progress was charted through their 2021–22 season, after their unenviable 10th-place finish in their previous season, and to become A-League Men champions for the first time.

The series was written and directed by Dan Jones and was executive produced by Silvio Salum and Vasili Papanicolou. The six episodes were released on 7 December 2022.

== Background ==
Western United were formed in 2018 as the Western Melbourne Group via a successful bid to enter the A-League Men; their inaugural season ultimately in 2019–20 finishing in the semi-finals within a COVID-19 pandemic struck finish. The following season in 2020–21; despite a promising first half to the league campaign, it would end out of the finals series spots at 10th place, with concerning outcomes based on consecutive losses to end the season. The club entered a set of issues such as no home ground, undergoing million dollar losses and sacking of head coach Mark Rudan, which ultimately would involve the replacement of John Aloisi for the 2021–22 season.

== Plot ==
Western United started their league season in defeat to Melbourne Victory before claiming their first league win in 10 matches to then claim four consecutive wins and defeated again by Melbourne Victory at the end of 2021. They went a further 9 matches unbeaten, until ups and downs on results dropped them from second to third place spot, and missing out on the Premiership by four points at the conclusion of the regular season. They finished the league season in third place with 13 wins, 6 draws and 7 defeats at 45 points; the most in their history, qualifying for the finals series.

They won the elimination-finals against Wellington Phoenix 1–0 to qualify for the two-legged semi-finals against Melbourne Victory; losing the first leg 1–0, but recovering to win 4–1 to qualify for the Grand Final against Melbourne City, which they won 2–0; winning their first A-League Men Championship.

== Episodes ==
No.	Title	Featured matches	Original release date
1	"Nomads and Pariahs"	Western United 0–1 Melbourne Victory (20 November); Western United 1–0 Perth Glory (26 November); Melbourne City 0–1 Western United (4 December); Western United 1–0 Brisbane Roar (11 December); Western United 1–0 Adelaide United (17 December); Melbourne Victory 3–1 Western United (26 December)	7 December 2022
2	"Rising From The Ashes"	Western United 1–0 Melbourne City (29 January); Western Sydney Wanderers 0–1 Western United (5 February); Western United 3–2 Western Sydney Wanderers (20 February); Western United 2–2 Melbourne City (12 March); Sydney FC 3–0 Western United (19 March); Melbourne Victory 1–1 Western United (23 March)	7 December 2022
3	"It's A Long Way To The Top"	Brisbane Roar 2–3 Western United (26 March); Western United 2–2 Central Coast Mariners (2 April); Western United 1–4 Wellington Phoenix (9 April); Western United 6–0 Perth Glory (16 April); Western United 2–0 Macarthur FC (19 April); Central Coast Mariners 1–0 Western United (30 April); Newcastle Jets 1–1 Western United (4 May)	7 December 2022
4	"United We Stand, Divided We Fall"	Adelaide United 2–1 Western United (8 May); Western United 1–0 Wellington Phoenix (Elimination-finals, 14 May)	7 December 2022
5	"Die Another Day"	Western United 0–1 Melbourne Victory (Semi-finals, 17 May); Melbourne Victory 1–4 Western United (Semi-finals, 21 May)	7 December 2022
6	"We are the Champions"	Melbourne City 0–2 Western United (Grand Final, 28 May)	7 December 2022

== Cast ==
=== Players ===
First-team players

The following first-team players make appearances in the docuseries.

Note: Flags indicate national team as defined under FIFA eligibility rules; some limited exceptions apply. Players may hold more than one non-FIFA nationality.

No.	Pos.	Nation	Player
1	GK	ENG	Jamie Young
4	DF	SUI	Léo Lacroix
5	DF	AUS	Dylan Pierias
6	DF	JPN	Tomoki Imai
8	FW	AUS	Lachlan Wales
9	FW	AUS	Dylan Wenzel-Halls
10	MF	AUS	Steven Lustica
11	FW	AUS	Connor Pain
12	DF	AUS	Dalibor Markovic
13	DF	AUS	Ivan Vujica
16	MF	SLO	Rene Krhin
17	DF	AUS	Ben Garuccio
19	DF	AUS	Josh Risdon (vice-captain)
21	MF	AUS	Sebastian Pasquali
23	MF	ITA	Alessandro Diamanti (captain)

No.	Pos.	Nation	Player
25	MF	AUS	Luke Duzel
26	MF	AUS	Nicolas Milanovic (scholarship)
27	MF	AUS	Jerry Skotadis
31	MF	AUS	Adisu Bayew (scholarship)
33	DF	AUS	Ben Collins (scholarship)
34	MF	AUS	Christian Theoharous (scholarship)
36	DF	AUS	Ajak Deu (scholarship)
37	GK	AUS	Ryan Scott
38	FW	AUS	Noah Botic
40	GK	AUS	Charlie Emery
42	MF	AUS	Rhys Bozinovski (scholarship)
44	DF	AUS	Nikolai Topor-Stanley
88	MF	AUS	Neil Kilkenny
99	FW	SRB	Aleksandar Prijović

=== Non-playing staff ===
Coaching and medical staff

Note: Age as of 1 July 2021

Position	Nation	Name	Age	Notes
First-team Head Coach	AUS	John Aloisi	45	From 1991 to 2011, Aloisi started his club career with Adelaide City until joining clubs from Belgium, Italy and England before returning to Australia to play for the Central Coast Mariners, Sydney FC and Melbourne Heart. He made 55 caps for the Australia national team, scoring 27 goals. He was head coach for Melbourne Heart and Brisbane Roar, joining Western United as head coach on 15 July 2021.
First-team Assistant Coaches	AUS	Hayden Foxe	44	Foxe started his club career in Germany with Arminia Bielefeld, to Japanese club Sanfrecce Hiroshima, further English clubs West Ham United, Portsmouth and on loan to Belgian club Mechelen, appearing in 11 caps for the Australia national team. He assistant coached Melbourne Heart, Western Sydney Wanderers and Perth Glory, joining Western United as assistant coach on 20 July 2021.
First-team Assistant Coaches	AUS	John Anastasiadis	52	Anastasiadis began his club career with Heidelberg United from 1986 to 1988, before moving to Greek club PAOK and returning to Australia at South Melbourne winning two domestic championships and one premiership with the club. He played with the Australia under-20s team. Anastasiadis managed Victorian sides South Melbourne, Oakleigh Cannons, Bentleigh Greens, and joining Western United as assistant coach on 11 January 2019.
First-team Goalkeeping Coach	AUS	Michael Theo	40	Theo played in two stints with Bulleen Zebras and South Melbourne from 2000 to 2004, along with stints at New Zealand club Football Kingz and English club Blackpool. Theo became goalkeeping coach for Western United in 2021.
First-team Analyst	AUS	Vince Ierardo		Ierardo was women and youth assistant coach with Melbourne Victory from 2016 to 2019. He became first-team analyst with Western United in July 2019.
First-team Lead Strength & Conditioning Coaches	AUS	Andrew Rondinelli		Rondinelli became first-team Lead Strength & Conditioning Coach with Western United in October 2019.
First-team Lead Strength & Conditioning Coaches	AUS	Massimo Murdocca	39	Murdocca began his senior career with NSL clubs Carlton and South Melbourne from 1998 to 2004, prior to a brief stint with Fawkner Blues. He joined A-League Men club Brisbane Roar winning two championships and one premiership, then Melbourne City and two further Victorian clubs Avondale and Nunawading City. Murdocca represented Australia through all youth levels from 1999 to 2004.
Academy Director	AUS	Anthony Frost		Frost was academy coach with Melbourne City from 2018 to 2021, as well as Australia under-20s assistant coach from 2020 to 2021, joining Western United as their first Academy Director on 18 November 2021.
Women's first-team Head Coach	AUS	Mark Torcaso	40	Torcaso managed affiliated club Calder United from 2016 and 2021, joining Western United Women on 29 June 2022.
Lead Physiotherapist	AUS	Ashley Lynch		Lynch became Lead Physiotherapist with Western United in September 2021.
Rehabilitation Physiotherapist	AUS	Daniel Hanna		Hanna became Rehabilitation Physiotherapist with Western United in October 2019.
Medical Consultant	AUS	David Bolzonello		
Head Doctor	AUS	Anthony Hipsley		

Management team

Position	Nation	Name	Age	Notes
Chairman	AUS	Jason Sourasis		Sourasis became chairman of Western United in February 2019.
Chief Executive Officer	AUS	Chris Pehlivanis		Pehlivanis became chief executive officer of Western United in October 2019.
Board Members	AUS	Steve Horvat	50	Horvat's club career varied through Australian clubs, including NSL clubs Melbourne Knights and Sunshine George Cross, a brief stint at Croatian club Hajduk Split and English club Crystal Palace. Horvat represented Australia with 32 caps. He became Director of Football with Western United in December 2018.
Board Members	AUS	John Tripodi		
Board Members	AUS	Levent Shevki		Shevki became Legal Counsel with Western United in January 2019.
Board Members	AUS	Daniel Trenton		

== Production and release ==
It was first announced on that Western United's journey towards their first A-League Men Championship would be implemented into a docuseries, along with the official trailer on 30 November 2022. All six episodes were released collectively on 7 December 2022.

== See also ==
- List of programs broadcast by Network 10
- Matildas: The World at Our Feet
- Dream Big (docuseries)
