= 2020–21 Western United FC season =

Western United
2020–21 season
- Chairman: Jason Sourasis
- Manager: Marko Rudan
- Stadium: GMHBA Stadium; AAMI Park; Mars Stadium; UTAS Stadium
- A-League: 10th
- A-League Finals: DNQ
- FFA Cup: Cancelled
- Top goalscorer: League: Besart Berisha (7); All: Besart Berisha (7)
- Highest home attendance: 7,016 vs. Melbourne Victory (30 January 2021); A-League
- Lowest home attendance: 990 vs. Newcastle Jets (26 April 2021); A-League
- Average home league attendance: 3,290
- Biggest win: 4–1 vs. Macarthur FC (H) (20 February 2021); A-League
- Biggest defeat: 0–5 vs. Western Sydney Wanderers (A) (8 May 2021); A-League; 1–6 vs. Melbourne Victory (H) (28 May 2021); A-League
Home colours	Away colours

The 2020–21 season was the second in the history of Western United Football Club. The club only participated in the A-League after the 2020 FFA Cup was cancelled due to the COVID-19 pandemic in Australia.

Western United finished tenth in their A-League season, forcing them to play in an FFA Cup play-off in the 2021–22 season.

== Review ==
=== Background ===
Western United's inaugural campaign had seen the team finish 5th and advance to the 2020 A-League Finals series, where they won the elimination-final against Brisbane Roar with the only goal from a free kick from Alessandro Diamanti. They advanced to the semi-final where they lost 2–0 against Melbourne City.

=== Pre-season ===
The club confirmed four player departures on 31 August 2020 which included Valentino Yuel, Thiel Iradukunda, Oskar Dillon, and Patrick Antelmi. The club's first transfer of the season came on 2 October, when Western United signed former Melbourne City winger Lachlan Wales on a two-year deal. In the span of two days on 6–7 December, two players Tomoki Imai and Andrew Durante both extended their contracts by one-year.

On 21 October, Jonathan Aspropotamitis departed the club to join Perth Glory and continue their AFC Champions League campaign. As the club returned to training ahead of the 2020–21 A-League campaign, they signed a sponsorship with Strapit Sports Tape for two A-League seasons. On 11 November, the club confirmed the departure of James Delianov who was injured throughout Western United's entire inaugural season as he signed for Adelaide United the same day. The day after, the club officially announced their kits for the 2020–21 season designed by Kappa.

On 27 November, the club signed Spanish midfielder Víctor Sánchez who made over 300 appearances in Spain's top-flight La Liga including a spell at Barcelona for three years. Western United played their first friendly on 28 November against local A-League rivals Melbourne City where they lost 2–1 in Melbourne in a behind closed doors match.

=== December ===
Western United kicked off their season in the A-League for their second campaign against Adelaide United where the match resulted in a 0–0 draw. Their new players included Víctor Sánchez, Lachlan Wales, Nicolas Milanovic, and Ayom Majok.

== Players ==
Note: Flags indicate national team as defined under FIFA eligibility rules; some limited exceptions apply. Players may hold more than one non-FIFA nationality.

No.	Pos.	Nation	Player
1	GK	POL	Filip Kurto
2	DF	AUS	Aaron Calver
3	DF	AUS	Brendan Hamill
4	DF	NZL	Andrew Durante
5	DF	AUS	Dylan Pierias
6	DF	JPN	Tomoki Imai
7	FW	KOS	Besart Berisha
8	FW	AUS	Lachlan Wales
9	FW	ENG	Kaine Sheppard
10	MF	AUS	Steven Lustica
11	FW	AUS	Connor Pain
12	DF	AUS	Dalibor Markovic
13	DF	AUS	Ivan Vujica

No.	Pos.	Nation	Player
14	MF	AUS	Max Burgess
17	MF	AUS	Brad Inman (on loan from ATK Mohun Bagan)
19	DF	AUS	Josh Risdon
20	MF	ESP	Víctor Sánchez
21	MF	AUS	Sebastian Pasquali
22	DF	AUS	Tomislav Uskok (vice-captain)
23	MF	ITA	Alessandro Diamanti (captain)
25	MF	AUS	Luke Duzel
26	MF	AUS	Nicolas Milanovic (scholarship)
27	MF	AUS	Jerry Skotadis
29	FW	AUS	Ayom Majok (scholarship)
30	GK	AUS	Ryan Scott
34	MF	ESP	Iker Guarrotxena

== Transfers ==
=== Transfers in ===
No.	Position	Player	Transferred from	Type/fee	Contract length	Date	Ref
8	FW	Lachlan Wales	Unattached	Free transfer	2 years	2 October 2020	
20	MF	(Spain) Víctor Sánchez	Unattached	Free transfer	2 years	27 November 2020	
29	FW	Ayom Majok	(Australia) Cumberland United	Scholarship	2 years	3 December 2020	
12	FW	Stefan Zinni	(Australia) Avondale	Injury replacement	2 months	27 December 2020	
34	MF	(Spain) Iker Guarrotxena	Unattached	Free transfer	6 months	14 January 2021	
9	FW	(England) Kaine Sheppard	Unattached	Free transfer	4 months	26 February 2021	
17	MF	Brad Inman	(India) ATK Mohun Bagan	Loan	4 months	12 March 2021	
12	DF	Dalibor Markovic	Melbourne Victory	Free transfer		12 April 2021	

=== Transfers out ===
No.	Position	Player	Transferred to	Type/fee	Date	Ref
26	FW	Patrick Antelmi	(Australia) Sydney United	End of contract	31 August 2020	
7	FW	Valentino Yuel	Unattached	End of contract	1 September 2020	
24	MF	Thiel Iradukunda	Unattached	End of contract	1 September 2020	
28	DF	Oskar Dillon	Unattached	End of contract	1 September 2020	
15	DF	Jonathan Aspropotamitis	Perth Glory	Mutual contract termination	21 October 2020	
20	GK	James Delianov	Adelaide United	Mutual contract termination	11 November 2020	
33	FW	Apostolos Stamatelopoulos	Unattached	Mutual contract termination	25 January 2021	
17	MF	Joshua Cavallo	Unattached	Mutual contract termination	10 February 2021	
12	FW	Stefan Zinni	(Australia) Avondale	End of contract	27 February 2021	

=== Contract extensions ===
No.	Name	Position	Duration	Date	Notes
6	(Japan) Tomoki Imai	Defender	1 year	6 October 2020	
4	(New Zealand) Andrew Durante	Centre-back	1 year	7 October 2020	
5	Dylan Pierias	Right-back	2 years	4 May 2021	
11	Connor Pain	Winger	2 years	10 May 2021	
30	Ryan Scott	Goalkeeper	2 years	20 May 2021	
26	Nicolas Milanovic	Midfielder	2 years	1 June 2021	

== Kits ==
Supplier: Kappa / Sponsor: Simonds & Tasman Logistics / Sleeve sponsor: Victoria University

Home	Away	Goalkeeper^{1}	Goalkeeper^{2}	Goalkeeper^{3}

== Pre-season and friendlies ==
Win Draw Loss

28 November 2020	Melbourne City (Australia)	2–1	(Australia) Western United	Melbourne
	Nabbout 59'; Maclaren (?)	Report	Pierias (?)	Stadium: City Football Academy; Attendance: 0 (behind closed doors)

5 December 2020	Western United (Australia)	9–0	(Australia) North Geelong Warriors	Geelong
15:00 AEDT	Pierias 1'; Stamatelopoulos 11', 38'; Lustica 16'; Wales 40', 57'; Zinni 70', 77'; Baker 87'	Report		Stadium: GMHBA Stadium

12 December 2020	Western United (Australia)	2–3	(Australia) Melbourne City	Ballarat
15:00 AEDT	Pain 43'; Stamatelopoulos 78'	Report	Maclaren 7', 71'; O'Neill 17'	Stadium: Morshead Park Stadium

20 December 2020	Brisbane Roar (Australia)	0–2	(Australia) Western United	Gold Coast
		Report	Calver 73'; Majok 85'	Stadium: Gold Coast Sports and Leisure Centre

== Competitions ==
Win Draw Loss

=== Overview ===
Competition	First match	Last match	Starting round	Final position	Record							
Competition	First match	Last match	Starting round	Final position	Pld	W	D	L	GF	GA	GD	Win %
A-League	28 December 2020	5 June 2021	Matchday 1	10th	26	8	4	14	30	47	−17	30.77
Total					26	8	4	14	30	47	−17	30.77

Source: Competitions

=== A-League ===
==== League table ====
Pos	Team	Pld	W	D	L	GF	GA	GD	Pts	Qualification
8	Western Sydney Wanderers	26	9	8	9	45	43	+2	35	
9	Perth Glory	26	9	7	10	44	44	0	34	Qualification for 2021 FFA Cup play-offs (Note: The top 8 teams qualified for the round of 32, while the bottom four teams participated in a playoff round.)
10	Western United	26	8	4	14	30	47	−17	28	Qualification for 2021 FFA Cup play-offs
11	Newcastle Jets	26	5	6	15	24	38	−14	21	Qualification for 2021 FFA Cup play-offs
12	Melbourne Victory	26	5	4	17	31	60	−29	19	Qualification for 2022 AFC Champions League qualifying play-offs and 2021 FFA Cup play-offs (Note: Qualified as the 2021 FFA Cup winners.)

Source: A-Leagues
Rules for classification: 1) Points; 2) Goal difference; 3) Goals scored; 4) Least red cards; 5) Least yellow cards; 6) Toss of a coin in an event of a tie of two clubs.

==== Results summary ====
Overall								Home						Away					
Pld	W	D	L	GF	GA	GD	Pts	W	D	L	GF	GA	GD	W	D	L	GF	GA	GD
26	8	4	14	30	47	−17	28	6	3	4	18	17	+1	2	1	10	12	30	−18

Source: Ultimate A-League

==== Results by round ====
Round	1	2	3	4	5	6	7	8	9	10	11	11	12	13	14	15	15	16	17	18	18	19	19	20	20	21	22	23	23	24
Ground	H	B	B	A	H	H	A	B	H	A	H	A	H	A	B	H	A	A	H	H	H	A	A	A	A	H	A	H	H	A
Result	D	B	B	L	W	D	L	B	W	W	L	L	W	L	B	W	W	L	W	D	W	D	L	L	L	L	L	L	L	L
Position	4	7	8	10	7	9	10	10	10	8	9	9	8	9	10	7	7	8	7	6	6	7	7	8	8	10	10	10	10	10
Points	1	1	1	1	4	5	5	5	8	11	11	11	14	14	14	17	20	20	23	24	27	28	28	28	28	28	28	28	28	28

Source: Ultimate A-League
A = Away; H = Home; B = Bye; W = Win; D = Draw; L = Loss

==== Matches ====
28 December 2020 1	Western United	0–0	Adelaide United	Geelong
19:05 AEDT		Report		Stadium: GMHBA Stadium; Attendance: 5,128; Referee: Shaun Evans

16 January 2021 4	Melbourne City	2–1	Western United	Melbourne
18:00 AEST	Noone 32'; Maclaren 84'	Report	Vujica 22'	Stadium: AAMI Park; Attendance: 7,068; Referee: Shaun Evans

23 January 2021 5	Western United	5–4	Perth Glory	Geelong
17:05 AEDT	Sánchez 10'; Pierias 60', 64'; Imai 75'; Lustica 84'	Report	Armiento 56', 78'; Fornaroli 58'; D'Agostino 69'	Stadium: GMHBA Stadium; Attendance: 3,631; Referee: Jonathan Barreiro

30 January 2021 6	Western United	0–0	Melbourne Victory	Melbourne
17:05 AEDT		Report		Stadium: AAMI Park; Attendance: 7,016; Referee: Adam Kersey

7 February 2021 7	Central Coast Mariners	3–2	Western United	Gosford
18:00 AEDT	Simon 17'; Kuol 77', 81'	Report	Uskok 4'; Berisha 42'	Stadium: Central Coast Stadium; Attendance: 5,019; Referee: Alireza Faghani

20 February 2021 9	Western United	4–1	Macarthur FC	Ballarat
17:05 AEDT	Guarrotxena 26'; Berisha 45', 66'; Pierias 54'	Report	Derbyshire 90+1'	Stadium: MARS Stadium; Attendance: 1,505; Referee: Jonathan Barreiro

27 February 2021 10	Melbourne Victory	3–4	Western United	Melbourne
19:10 AEDT	McManaman 21'; Butterfield 62'; Gestede 82'	Report	Sanchez 42', 90'; Berisha 53', 58'	Stadium: Marvel Stadium; Attendance: 7,190; Referee: Ben Abraham

7 March 2021 11	Western United	0–1	Western Sydney Wanderers	Ballarat
18:00 AEDT		Report	Mutch 57'	Stadium: Mars Stadium; Attendance: 2,142; Referee: Alex King

10 March 2021 11	Sydney FC	2–0	Western United	Sydney
19:05 AEST	Bobô 18' (pen.); Grant 47'	Report		Stadium: Netstrata Jubilee Stadium; Attendance: 5,201; Referee: Daniel Elder

14 March 2021 12	Western United	1–0	Brisbane Roar	Melbourne
17:10 AEST	Pierias 72'	Report		Stadium: AAMI Park; Attendance: 1,920; Referee: Alireza Faghani

20 March 2021 13	Macarthur FC	2–1	Western United	Sydney
17:05 AEDT	Derbyshire 35'; Susaeta 45+1'	Report	Pierias 8'	Stadium: Campbelltown Stadium; Attendance: 1,872; Referee: Adam Kersey

1 April 2021 15	Western United	2–1	Melbourne City	Melbourne
19:40 AEST	Wales 61'; Berisha 66'	Report	Noone 12'	Stadium: AAMI Park; Attendance: 6,104; Referee: Jonathan Barreiro

5 April 2021 15	Newcastle Jets	0–1	Western United	Newcastle
17:00 AEST		Report	Wales 1'	Stadium: McDonald Jones Stadium; Attendance: 4,301; Referee: Ben Abraham

11 April 2021 16	Wellington Phoenix	3–2	Western United	Wollongong
19:00 AEST	Dávila 45+1' (pen.); Sotirio 53'; Waine 90'	Report	Berisha 32' (pen.); Guarrotxena 56'	Stadium: WIN Stadium; Attendance: 1,226; Referee: Chris Beath

17 April 2021 17	Western United	1–0	Central Coast Mariners	Launceston
17:05 AEST	Pain 5'	Report		Stadium: UTAS Stadium; Attendance: 3,203; Referee: Alireza Faghani

22 April 2021 18	Western United	1–1	Wellington Phoenix	Launceston
19:00 AEDT	Wales 27'	Report	Waine 7'	Stadium: UTAS Stadium; Attendance: 2,528; Referee: Alex King

26 April 2021 18	Western United	2–0	Newcastle Jets	Melbourne
19:05 AEST	Topor-Stanley 12' (o.g.); Pierias 69'	Report		Stadium: AAMI Park; Attendance: 990; Referee: Kurt Ams

30 April 2021 19	Adelaide United	0–0	Western United	Adelaide
19:05 ACST		Report		Stadium: Coopers Stadium; Attendance: 7,699; Referee: Chris Beath

5 May 2021 19	Brisbane Roar	2–1	Western United	Kippa-Ring
19:05 AEST	Brindell-South 72'; Danzaki 90+4'	Report	Wales 60'	Stadium: Dolphin Stadium; Attendance: 2,183; Referee: Adam Kersey

8 May 2021 20	Western Sydney Wanderers	5–0	Western United	Sydney
19:10 AEST	Troisi 19'; Gordon 36'; Kamau 57'; Pierias 66' (o.g.); Ibini 90'	Report		Stadium: Bankwest Stadium; Attendance: 7,539; Referee: Daniel Elder

12 May 2021 20	Perth Glory	3–0	Western United	Perth
21:20 AWST	Fornaroli 10'; Ikonomidis 22'; Chianese 77'	Report		Stadium: HBF Park; Attendance: 2,719; Referee: Alireza Faghani

15 May 2021 21	Western United	0–1	Sydney FC	Ballarat
14:35 AEST		Report	Le Fondre 76' (pen.)	Stadium: MARS Stadium; Attendance: 2,020; Referee: Shaun Evans

22 May 2021 22	Wellington Phoenix	3–0	Western United	Wellington
14:05 NZDT	Lewis 38'; Piscopo 57'; Hemed 63'	Report		Stadium: Sky Stadium; Attendance: 24,105; Referee: Daniel Elder

28 May 2021 23	Western United	1–6	Melbourne Victory	Melbourne
19:05 AEST	Diamanti 45+3' (pen.)	Report	Brimmer 12'; Gestede 22'; Kamsoba 33', 50'; Folami 36'; Butterfield 82'	Stadium: AAMI Park; Attendance: 0 (behind closed doors); Referee: Adam Bavcar

31 May 2021 23	Western United	1–2	Macarthur FC	Sydney
19:05 AEDT	Guarrotxena 63'	Report	Susaeta 27'; Milligan 31'	Stadium: Leichhardt Oval; Referee: Adam Kersey

5 June 2021 24	Central Coast Mariners	2–0	Western United	Gosford
17:05 AEST	Clisby 25'; Ureña 90+5'	Report		Stadium: Central Coast Stadium; Attendance: 6,451; Referee: Jack Morgan

== Statistics ==
=== Appearances and goals ===
Players with no appearances not included in the list.

No.	Pos.	Nat.	Name	A-League		Total	
No.	Pos.	Nat.	Name	Apps	Goals	Apps	Goals
1	GK	(Poland)	Filip Kurto	8	0	8	0
2	DF	(Australia)	Aaron Calver	15(3)	0	15(3)	0
3	DF	(Australia)	Brendan Hamill	9(6)	0	9(6)	0
4	DF	(New Zealand)	Andrew Durante	17(2)	0	17(2)	0
5	DF	(Australia)	Dylan Pierias	20(6)	6	20(6)	6
6	DF	(Japan)	Tomoki Imai	26	1	26	1
7	FW	(Kosovo)	Besart Berisha	20(3)	7	20(3)	7
8	FW	(Australia)	Lachlan Wales	14(10)	4	14(10)	4
9	FW	(England)	Kaine Sheppard	0(7)	0	0(7)	0
10	MF	(Australia)	Steven Lustica	14(6)	1	14(6)	1
11	FW	(Australia)	Connor Pain	25(1)	1	25(1)	1
12	DF	(Australia)	Dalibor Markovic	1(2)	0	1(2)	0
13	DF	(Australia)	Ivan Vujica	5(7)	1	5(7)	1
14	MF	(Australia)	Max Burgess	0(1)	0	0(1)	0
17	MF	(Australia)	Brad Inman	0(5)	0	0(5)	0
19	DF	(Australia)	Josh Risdon	2(1)	0	2(1)	0
20	MF	(Spain)	Víctor Sánchez	18	3	18	3
21	MF	(Australia)	Sebastian Pasquali	2(4)	0	2(4)	0
22	DF	(Australia)	Tomislav Uskok	23	1	23	1
23	MF	(Italy)	Alessandro Diamanti	20(4)	1	20(4)	1
25	MF	(Australia)	Luke Duzel	8(5)	0	8(5)	0
26	MF	(Australia)	Nicolas Milanovic	0(10)	0	0(10)	0
27	MF	(Australia)	Jerry Skotadis	3(7)	0	3(7)	0
29	MF	(Australia)	Ayom Majok	0(1)	0	0(1)	0
30	GK	(Australia)	Ryan Scott	18(1)	0	18(1)	0
31	MF	(Australia)	Adisu Bayew	1(3)	0	1(3)	0
32	FW	(Australia)	Manyluak Aguek	0(2)	0	0(2)	0
34	FW	(Spain)	Iker Guarrotxena	17(5)	3	17(5)	3

=== Goalscorers ===
Rank	No.	Pos	Nat	Name	A-League	Total
1	7	FW	(Kosovo)	Besart Berisha	7	7
2	5	DF	(Australia)	Dylan Pierias	6	6
3	8	FW	(Australia)	Lachlan Wales	4	4
4	20	MF	(Spain)	Víctor Sánchez	3	3
4	34	FW	(Spain)	Iker Guarrotxena	3	3
6	6	DF	(Japan)	Tomoki Imai	1	1
6	10	MF	(Australia)	Steven Lustica	1	1
6	11	FW	(Australia)	Connor Pain	1	1
6	13	FW	(Croatia)	Ivan Vujica	1	1
6	22	DF	(Australia)	Tomislav Uskok	1	1
6	23	MF	(Australia)	Alessandro Diamanti	1	1
Own Goals					1	1
Totals					1	1

=== Disciplinary record ===
The list is sorted by squad number when total cards are equal. Players with no cards not included in the list.

Rank	No.	Pos.	Nat.	Name	A-League			Total		
Rank	No.	Pos.	Nat.	Name	Yellow card	Second yellow card	Red card	Yellow card	Second yellow card	Red card
1	4	DF	(New Zealand)	Andrew Durante	3	0	1	3	0	1
2	20	MF	(Spain)	Víctor Sánchez	9	1	0	9	1	0
2	22	DF	(Australia)	Tomislav Uskok	9	1	0	9	1	0
4	3	DF	(Australia)	Brendan Hamill	5	1	0	5	1	0
5	10	MF	(Australia)	Steven Lustica	4	0	0	4	0	0
6	6	DF	(Japan)	Tomoki Imai	3	0	0	3	0	0
6	7	FW	(Kosovo)	Besart Berisha	3	0	0	3	0	0
6	25	MF	(Australia)	Luke Duzel	3	0	0	3	0	0
6	34	FW	(Spain)	Iker Guarrotxena	3	0	0	3	0	0
10	2	DF	(Australia)	Aaron Calver	2	0	0	2	0	0
10	5	DF	(Australia)	Dylan Pierias	2	0	0	2	0	0
10	8	FW	(Australia)	Lachlan Wales	2	0	0	2	0	0
10	11	FW	(Australia)	Connor Pain	2	0	0	2	0	0
10	13	DF	(Australia)	Ivan Vujica	2	0	0	2	0	0
10	23	MF	(Italy)	Alessandro Diamanti	2	0	0	2	0	0
10	30	GK	(Australia)	Ryan Scott	2	0	0	2	0	0
17	12	DF	(Australia)	Dalibor Markovic	1	0	0	1	0	0
17	14	MF	(Australia)	Max Burgess	1	0	0	1	0	0
17	26	FW	(Australia)	Nicolas Milanovic	1	0	0	1	0	0
17	27	MF	(Australia)	Jerry Skotadis	1	0	0	1	0	0
17	29	MF	(Australia)	Ayom Majok	1	0	0	1	0	0

=== Clean sheets ===
Rank	No.	Pos	Nat	Name	A-League	Total
1	30	GK	(Australia)	Ryan Scott	6	6
2	1	GK	(Poland)	Filip Kurto	2	2
Total					8	8
