= 2019–20 Western United FC season =

Western United
2019–20 season
- Chairman: Jason Sourasis
- Head Coach: Marko Rudan
- Stadium: GMHBA Stadium; Mars Stadium
- A-League: 5th
- A-League Finals: Semi-finals
- Top goalscorer: League: Besart Berisha (19); All: Besart Berisha (19)
- Highest home attendance: 10,128 vs. Melbourne Victory (8 December 2019); A-League
- Lowest home attendance: 2,973 vs. Brisbane Roar (16 February 2020); A-League
- Average home league attendance: 5,583
- Biggest win: 6–2 vs. Central Coast Mariners (H) (1 March 2020); A-League; 5–1 vs. Adelaide United (A) (7 March 2020); A-League
- Biggest defeat: 0–2 (3 times); 1–3 (twice)
Home colours	Away colours

The 2019–20 season was the Western United Football Club's first season. Western United competed in the A-League for the first time, though they did not compete in the FFA Cup.

On 24 March 2020, the FFA announced that the 2019–20 A-League season would be postponed until further notice due to the COVID-19 pandemic in Australia and New Zealand. The season resumed on 17 July 2020. Western United finished fifth in their inaugural A-League season, finishing at the semi-finals.

== Kits ==
- Supplier: Kappa
- Sponsors: Probuild (front) / Hyundai Motor Company (sleeve)

Home	Away	Away alt.	Goalkeeper^{1}	Goalkeeper^{2}	Goalkeeper^{3}

=== Kit information ===
On 20 May 2019, Western United announced Kappa as the club's supplier for the home and away kits and training apparel for both players and staff. The designs for the home and away kits were released on 17 June. On 3 July, the club announced Probuild as a major partner and shirt sponsor for the season.

== Season overview ==
=== Pre-season ===
On 8 May 2019, Western United unveiled their logo as a new member of the A-League Men. In the same month, the club announced Mark Rudan as the head coach for the inaugural season. He signed for the club on a three-year contract after the 2018–19 season with Wellington Phoenix. Polish goalkeeper Filip Kurto and midfielder Max Burgess also signed for Western United from the Phoenix. Among the new signings in the same month, Western United announced Australian-born Turkish international centre-back Ersan Gülüm, and Australian international striker Scott McDonald. Centre-back Brendan Hamill and goalkeeper James Delianov also signed for the club from their respective A-League clubs.

In June, Western United announced the signings of former New Zealand international centre-back Andrew Durante and full-back Ivan Vujica. On 15 July, the club held their first training session for the season. On 26 July, the club announced the signing of former Italian international midfielder Alessandro Diamanti on a one-year marquee contract. Western United won their first match in club history against Caroline Springs George Cross on 22 August. Valentino Yuel scored the club's first-ever goal in the 4–0 win at City Vista Recreation Reserve.

In the fourth pre-season match on 10 September, Western United won their first game against an A-League opposition in a 2–1 win over Melbourne City. Yuel scored his fourth goal in pre-season and the winner in the match. In that same week, Western United announced the signings of Burundi-born midfielder Thiel Iradukunda, and Croatian midfielder Dario Jertec. At Morshead Park in Ballarat, Western United played two pre-season matches against Adelaide United (0–0) on 21 September, and reigning champions Sydney FC (1–2) six days later. The team played their last pre-season match against Western Sydney Wanderers on 5 October. In the end of September, the club added midfielder Luke Duzel and Kosovan striker Besart Berisha to the squad. Duzel was later selected in the Australia under-17 team that took part in the 2019 FIFA U-17 World Cup.

=== October ===
On 9 October, Diamanti was named the club's captain. The next day, the match-squad was announced for the first league game of the season against Wellington Phoenix. Duzel was the only player unavailable due to international duty. On 13 October, Western United won their first-ever league game in their A-League debut. Berisha scored the winner and first-ever league goal for the club in the 1–0 win over Wellington Phoenix at Westpac Stadium. Six days later, Western United drew in their first-ever home game of the season in a 1–1 draw to Perth Glory at GMHBA Stadium. Panagiotis Kone scored the opening goal and his first of the season. 6,888 spectators were in attendance for the club's first home match. Diamanti was named in the A-League Team of the Week for his performance against Perth.

On 27 October, Western United suffered their first loss to Melbourne City. Berisha scored the only goal from a penalty in the club's 2–1 defeat in their first clash against a Victorian side. For the match squad, Hamill, Vujica, and Josh Cavallo were promoted while Jerry Skotadis was left out. Yuel and Apostolos Stamatelopoulos were ruled out with injury and Duzel was unavailable due to international duty. After the match, Kurto was second in the A-League for the most saves so far with 13 in total. On 29 October, Rudan was nominated for the A-League Coach of the Month award as his side sat fifth on the table with four points.

=== November ===
On 2 November, Western United played their first meeting against Melbourne Victory in the club's history. The team completed a 3–2 comeback win with goals from Diamanti, McDonald, and an own goal from James Donachie. 20,865 spectators were in attendance at Docklands Stadium. For the match squad, Jonathan Aspropotamitis was promoted while Skotadis was left out for a second time. Yuel and Stamatelopoulos were ruled out with injury, while Duzel remained absent due to international duty. In the post-match press conference, Rudan praised the club culture that helped secure the win. Kone and McDonald were named in the A-League Team of the Week for their performance. On 7 November, full-back Josh Risdon was named for the Australia national team ahead of the 2022 FIFA World Cup qualifying match against Jordan.

On 8 November, Western United announced the signing of goalkeeper Ryan Scott on a three-month contract to replace Delianov who was ruled out with a knee injury. On the same day, the club reached 4,000 members.

== Players ==
Note: Flags indicate national team as defined under FIFA eligibility rules; some limited exceptions apply. Players may hold more than one non-FIFA nationality.

No.	Pos.	Nation	Player
1	GK	POL	Filip Kurto
2	DF	AUS	Aaron Calver
3	DF	AUS	Brendan Hamill
4	DF	NZL	Andrew Durante
5	DF	AUS	Dylan Pierias
6	DF	JPN	Tomoki Imai
7	FW	AUS	Valentino Yuel
9	FW	AUS	Apostolos Stamatelopoulos
10	MF	AUS	Steven Lustica
11	FW	AUS	Connor Pain
13	DF	AUS	Ivan Vujica
14	MF	AUS	Max Burgess
15	DF	AUS	Jonathan Aspropotamitis
17	MF	AUS	Joshua Cavallo

No.	Pos.	Nation	Player
18	FW	KOS	Besart Berisha
19	DF	AUS	Josh Risdon
20	GK	AUS	James Delianov
21	MF	AUS	Sebastian Pasquali
22	DF	AUS	Tomislav Uskok
23	MF	ITA	Alessandro Diamanti (captain)
24	MF	AUS	Thiel Iradukunda (scholarship)
25	MF	AUS	Luke Duzel (scholarship)
26	FW	AUS	Patrick Antelmi
27	MF	AUS	Jerry Skotadis
28	DF	AUS	Oskar Dillon
30	GK	AUS	Ryan Scott
—	MF	AUS	Nicolas Milanovic (scholarship)

== Transfers and contracts ==
=== Transfers in ===
No.	Position	Player	Transferred from	Type/fee	Contract length	Date	Ref
8	MF	(Greece) Panagiotis Kone	Unattached	Free transfer	2 years	1 February 2019	
19	DF	Josh Risdon	Western Sydney Wanderers	Free transfer	2 years	12 February 2019	
6	MF	Connor Chapman	Unattached	Free transfer	2 years	7 March 2019	
2	DF	Aaron Calver	Sydney FC	Free transfer	1 year	12 March 2019	
21	MF	Sebastian Pasquali	(Netherlands) Jong Ajax	Free transfer	3 years	16 March 2019	
5	DF	Dylan Pierias	Melbourne City	Free transfer	1 year	20 March 2019	
9	FW	Apostolos Stamatelopoulos	Adelaide United	Free transfer	1 year	20 March 2019	
7	FW	Valentino Yuel	(Australia) Bentleigh Greens	Free transfer	1 year	25 March 2019	
15	DF	Jonathan Aspropotamitis	Central Coast Mariners	Free transfer	1 year	15 April 2019	
17	MF	Joshua Cavallo	Melbourne City	Free transfer	1 year	15 April 2019	
11	FW	Connor Pain	Central Coast Mariners	Free transfer	1 year	15 April 2019	
22	DF	(Turkey) Ersan Gülüm	(Australia) Whittlesea United	Free transfer		7 May 2019	
10	FW	Scott McDonald	Unattached	Free transfer		8 May 2019	
20	GK	James Delianov	Melbourne City	Free transfer	2 years	9 May 2019	
1	GK	(Poland) Filip Kurto	Wellington Phoenix	Free transfer	2 years	14 May 2019	
3	DF	Brendan Hamill	Western Sydney Wanderers	Free transfer	2 years	15 May 2019	
14	MF	Max Burgess	Wellington Phoenix	Free transfer	2 years	27 May 2019	
4	DF	(New Zealand) Andrew Durante	Wellington Phoenix	Free transfer	1 year	11 June 2019	
13	DF	Ivan Vujica	Newcastle Jets	Free transfer		23 June 2019	
23	MF	(Italy) Alessandro Diamanti	Unattached	Free transfer		24 July 2019	
24	MF	Thiel Iradukunda	Unattached	Scholarship	1 year	2 September 2019	
12	MF	(Croatia) Dario Jertec	Unattached	Free transfer	1 year	10 September 2019	
25	MF	Luke Duzel	Melbourne City Youth	Scholarship	1 year	24 September 2019	
18	FW	(Kosovo) Besart Berisha	Unattached	Free transfer	2 years	27 September 2019	
27	MF	Jerry Skotadis	Unattached	Free transfer	1 year	5 October 2019	
26	FW	Kwabena Appiah	Unattached	Injury replacement		14 October 2019	
30	GK	Ryan Scott	(Australia) Bentleigh Greens	Injury replacement	3 months	8 November 2019	
28	DF	Oskar Dillon	(Australia) Gold Coast Knights	Free transfer	6 months	2 January 2020	
22	DF	Tomislav Uskok	(Australia) Sydney United	Free transfer	1.5 years	23 January 2020	
6	DF	(Japan) Tomoki Imai	Unattached	Free transfer	0.5 year	11 February 2020	
10	MF	Steven Lustica	(Uzbekistan) Qizilqum Zarafshon	Free transfer	0.5 year	21 February 2020	
26	FW	Patrick Antelmi	(Australia) Sydney United	Free transfer	2 months	17 July 2020	
	MF	Nicolas Milanovic	Western Sydney Wanderers Youth	Scholarship	1 year	17 July 2020	

=== Transfers out ===
No.	Position	Player	Transferred to	Type/fee	Date	Ref
6	MF	Connor Chapman	(South Korea) Daejeon Citizen	Undisclosed	29 December 2019	
10	FW	Scott McDonald	Brisbane Roar	Free transfer	17 January 2020	
26	FW	Kwabena Appiah	Unattached	End of contract	20 January 2020	
22	DF	(Turkey) Ersan Gülüm	Unattached	Mutual contract termination	22 January 2020	
12	MF	(Croatia) Dario Jertec	Unattached	Mutual contract termination	7 April 2020	
8	FW	(Greece) Panagiotis Kone	Unattached	Mutual contract termination	13 July 2020	

=== Contract extensions ===
No.	Name	Position	Duration	Date	Notes
27	Jerry Skotadis	Defensive midfielder	2 years	24 January 2020	
30	Ryan Scott	Goalkeeper	2 years	25 June 2020	
10	Steven Lustica	Central midfielder	1 year	29 June 2020	
23	(Italy) Alessandro Diamanti	Attacking midfielder	2 years	3 July 2020	
25	Luke Duzel	Midfielder	1 year	17 July 2020	

== Technical staff ==
Football Department

Position	Name
Head Coach	(Australia) Marko Rudan
Assistant Coach	(Australia) John Anastasiadis
Assistant Coach	(Malta) John Hutchinson
Director of Football	(Australia) Steve Horvat
Goalkeeping Coach	(Australia) Frank Juric

== Pre-season and friendlies ==
Win Draw Loss

22 August 2019	Caroline Springs George Cross (Australia)	0–4	(Australia) Western United	Melbourne
19:00 AEST		Report	Yuel 35'; Pain 45'; Pierias 54'; Stamatelopoulos 87'	Stadium: City Vista Pavilion and Sports Field; Attendance: 3,267

29 August 2019	Western United (Australia)	5–0	(Australia) Preston Lions	Melbourne
19:00 AEST	Yuel 49'; Cavallo 68'; Stamatelopoulos 70', 75'; Pierias 79'	Report		Stadium: City Vista Pavilion and Sports Field; Attendance: 2,532

3 September 2019	Western United (Australia)	2–0	(Australia) North Geelong Warriors	Melbourne
19:00 AEST	McDonald 28'; Yuel 85' (pen.)	Report		Stadium: City Vista Pavilion and Sports Field; Attendance: 2,135

10 September 2019	Melbourne City (Australia)	1–2	(Australia) Western United	Melbourne
	Najjarine 47'	Report	Delbridge 30' (o.g.); Yuel 58'	Stadium: City Football Academy; Attendance: 0 (behind closed doors)

15 September 2019	Western United (Australia)	0–6	(Australia) Melbourne Victory	Melbourne
13:00 AEST		Report	Toivonen (?); Nabbout (?); Athiu (?); Kamsoba (?); Kirdar (?)	Stadium: City Vista Pavilion and Sports Field; Attendance: 0 (behind closed doors)

21 September 2019	Western United (Australia)	0–0	(Australia) Adelaide United	Ballarat
15:00 AEST		Report		Stadium: Morshead Park

27 September 2019	Western United (Australia)	1–2	(Australia) Sydney FC	Ballarat
15:00 AEST	Diamanti 61'	Report	Ninković 27', 71'	Stadium: Morshead Park

5 October 2019	Western United (Australia)	1–1	(Australia) Western Sydney Wanderers	Geelong
13:00 AEST	McDonald 2'	Report	Adam 80'	Stadium: GMHBA Stadium; Referee: Jonathan Barreiro

== Competitions ==
=== Overall record ===
Competition	First match	Last match	Starting round	Final position	Record							
Competition	First match	Last match	Starting round	Final position	Pld	W	D	L	GF	GA	GD	Win %
A-League	13 October 2019	19 August 2020	Matchday 1	5th	26	12	3	11	46	37	+9	46.15
A-League Finals	23 August 2020	26 August 2020	Elimination-finals	Semi-finals	2	1	0	1	1	2	−1	50.00
Total					28	13	3	12	47	39	+8	46.43

Last updated: complete
Source: Competitions

=== A-League ===
==== League table ====
Pos	Team	Pld	W	D	L	GF	GA	GD	Pts	Qualification
1	Sydney FC (C)	26	16	5	5	49	25	+24	53	Qualification for 2021 AFC Champions League group stage and Finals series (Note: All Australian teams withdrew from the 2021 AFC Champions League on 4 June 2021.) (Note: The top two teams enter the Finals series at the semi-finals, while the teams ranked third to sixth enter the Finals series at the elimination-finals.)
2	Melbourne City	26	14	5	7	49	37	+12	47	Qualification for 2021 AFC Champions League qualifying play-offs and Finals series
3	Wellington Phoenix (Note: Wellington Phoenix cannot qualify for the 2021 AFC Champions League as they are not recognised as an AFC club.)	26	12	5	9	38	33	+5	41	Qualification for Finals series
4	Brisbane Roar	26	11	7	8	29	28	+1	40	Qualification for 2021 AFC Champions League qualifying play-offs and Finals series
5	Western United	26	12	3	11	46	37	+9	39	Qualification for Finals series
6	Perth Glory	26	10	7	9	43	36	+7	37	Qualification for Finals series
7	Adelaide United	26	11	3	12	44	49	−5	36	
8	Newcastle Jets	26	9	7	10	32	40	−8	34	
9	Western Sydney Wanderers	26	9	6	11	35	40	−5	33	
10	Melbourne Victory	26	6	5	15	33	44	−11	23	
11	Central Coast Mariners	26	5	3	18	26	55	−29	18	

Source: A-Leagues
Rules for classification: 1) points; 2) goal difference; 3) number of goals scored.
(C) Champions

==== Results summary ====
Overall								Home						Away					
Pld	W	D	L	GF	GA	GD	Pts	W	D	L	GF	GA	GD	W	D	L	GF	GA	GD
26	12	3	11	46	37	+9	39	5	1	7	26	24	+2	7	2	4	20	13	+7

Source: Ultimate A-League

==== Results by round ====
Round	1	2	3	4	5	6	7	8	9	10	11	12	13	14	15	16	17	18	19	20	21	22	23	28	29	25	24	26	27
Ground	A	H	H	A	H	H	A	H	H	A	A	H	A	B	H	H	A	B	H	A	H	A	B	N	N	N	N	N	N
Result	W	D	L	W	W	L	L	L	W	W	D	L	L	B	W	L	D	B	L	L	W	W	B	W	L	W	W	W	L
Position	3	3	5	4	2	4	5	5	4	3	3	4	5	5	5	6	6	7	7	8	7	6	6	5	5	5	6	4	5
Points	3	4	4	7	10	10	10	10	13	16	17	17	17	17	20	20	21	21	21	21	24	27	27	30	30	33	36	39	39

Source: Ultimate A-League
A = Away; H = Home; N = Neutral; B = Bye; W = Win; D = Draw; L = Loss

==== Matches ====
13 October 2019 1	Wellington Phoenix	0–1	Western United	Wellington
18:00 NZDT		Report	Berisha 34'	Stadium: Sky Stadium; Attendance: 8,254; Referee: Kurt Ams

19 October 2019 2	Western United	1–1	Perth Glory	Geelong
17:00 AEDT	Kone 49'	Report	Popovic 76'	Stadium: GMHBA Stadium; Attendance: 6,088; Referee: Alireza Faghani

27 October 2019 3	Western United	1–2	Melbourne City	Geelong
18:00 AEDT	Berisha 66' (pen.)	Report	Maclaren 32', 85'	Stadium: GMHBA Stadium; Attendance: 7,042; Referee: Adam Kersey

2 November 2019 4	Melbourne Victory	2–3	Western United	Melbourne
19:30 AEDT	Toivonen 6'; Dobras 7'	Report	Diamanti 16'; Donachie 29' (o.g.); McDonald 51'	Stadium: Marvel Stadium; Attendance: 20,865; Referee: Alireza Faghani

9 November 2019 5	Western United	2–1	Western Sydney Wanderers	Geelong
19:30 AEDT	Durante 13'; Appiah 58'	Report	Duke	Stadium: GMHBA Stadium; Attendance: 4,588; Referee: Alex King

16 November 2019 6	Western United	0–1	Newcastle Jets	Geelong
19:30 AEDT		Report	Thurgate 36'	Stadium: GMHBA Stadium; Attendance: 5,688; Referee: Alireza Faghani

24 November 2019 7	Central Coast Mariners	1–0	Western United	Gosford
18:00 AEDT	Gallifuoco 49'	Report		Stadium: Central Coast Stadium; Attendance: 5,075; Referee: Alex King

1 December 2019 8	Western United	0–2	Sydney FC	Geelong
16:00 AEDT		Report	Le Fondre 27', 45+4'	Stadium: GMHBA Stadium; Attendance: 4,187; Referee: Stephen Lucas

8 December 2019 9	Western United	3–1	Melbourne Victory	Geelong
16:00 AEDT	Berisha 17', 43'; Kone 24'	Report	Nabbout 14'	Stadium: GMHBA Stadium; Attendance: 10,128; Referee: Adam Kersey

13 December 2019 10	Brisbane Roar	0–2	Western United	Brisbane
18:30 AEST		Report	Pain 11'; Berisha 45+1'	Stadium: Suncorp Stadium; Attendance: 8,582; Referee: Chris Beath

20 December 2019 11	Western Sydney Wanderers	1–1	Western United	Sydney
19:30 AEDT	Ziegler 79'	Report	Calver 87'	Stadium: Bankwest Stadium; Attendance: 11,988; Referee: Alireza Faghani

28 December 2019 12	Western United	1–3	Wellington Phoenix	Ballarat
17:00 AEDT	Diamanti 89' (pen.)	Report	Ball 41'; McCowatt 55'; Dávila 80'	Stadium: Mars Stadium; Attendance: 5,084; Referee: Shaun Evans

3 January 2020 13	Melbourne City	3–2	Western United	Melbourne
19:30 AEDT	Maclaren 5', 44'; Luna 36'	Report	Berisha 75' (pen.); Diamanti 79' (pen.)	Stadium: AAMI Park; Attendance: 8,577; Referee: Adam Kersey

19 January 2020 15	Western United	3–0	Central Coast Mariners	Geelong
16:00 AEDT	Berisha 6', 21'; Rowles 18' (o.g.)	Report		Stadium: GMHBA Stadium; Attendance: 6,020; Referee: Jonathon Barreiro

26 January 2020 16	Western United	3–4	Adelaide United	Melbourne
18:00 AEDT	Berisha 12', 43'; Diamanti 54'	Report	Mileusnic 9', 15'; McGree 18'; Konstandopoulos 79'	Stadium: Whitten Oval; Attendance: 5,988; Referee: Kurt Ams

1 February 2020 17	Newcastle Jets	0–0	Western United	Newcastle
17:00 AEDT		Report		Stadium: McDonald Jones Stadium; Attendance: 5,458; Referee: Jonathon Barreiro

16 February 2020 19	Western United	0–1	Brisbane Roar	Ballarat
16:00 AEDT		Report	Muratovic 61'	Stadium: Mars Stadium; Attendance: 2,973; Referee: Alireza Faghani

21 February 2020 20	Wellington Phoenix	2–0	Western United	Wellington
19:15 NZDT	Cacace 29'; Ball 90'	Report		Stadium: Sky Stadium; Attendance: 7,281; Referee: Shaun Evans

1 March 2020 21	Western United	6–2	Central Coast Mariners	Geelong
16:00 AEDT	Berisha 9', 89'; Burgess 25', 30', 43'; Durante 61'	Report	Harold 19' (pen.); Stensness 45'	Stadium: GMHBA Stadium; Attendance: 3,629; Referee: Ben Abraham

7 March 2020 22	Adelaide United	1–5	Western United	Adelaide
16:30 ACDT	McGree 25'	Report	Berisha 18', 56'; Diamanti 32'; Burgess 38'; Pain 48'	Stadium: Coopers Stadium; Attendance: 8,473; Referee: Stephen Lucas

Season postponement due to COVID-19 pandemic in Australia

25 July 2020 28	Melbourne Victory	1–2	Western United	Sydney
18:35 AEST	Roux 83'	Report	Uskok 38'; Burgess 57'	Stadium: Bankwest Stadium; Attendance: 0 (behind closed doors); Referee: Alireza Faghani
Note: Match originally scheduled for 18 April 2020 at AAMI Park, but postponed and relocated due to the COVID-19 pandemic in Australia. It was rescheduled to 25 July 2020 at Bankwest Stadium.

2 August 2020 29	Newcastle Jets	1–0	Western United	Newcastle
18:30 AEST	O'Donovan 29'	Report		Stadium: McDonald Jones Stadium; Attendance: 2,570; Referee: Alex King
Note: Match originally scheduled for 24 April 2020, but postponed due to the COVID-19 pandemic in Australia. It was rescheduled to 2 August 2020.

7 August 2020 25	Western United	5–3	Western Sydney Wanderers	Sydney
18:30 AEST	Risdon 6'; Berisha 19'; Diamanti 52', 87'; Burgess 84'	Report	Duke 69', 82'; Mourdoukoutas 76'	Stadium: Netstrata Jubilee Stadium; Attendance: 0 (behind closed doors); Referee: Alireza Faghani
Note: Match originally scheduled for 29 March 2020 at Mars Stadium, but postponed and relocated due to the COVID-19 pandemic in Australia. It was rescheduled to 7 August 2020 at Netstrata Jubilee Stadium.

12 August 2020 24	Perth Glory	0–2	Western United	Sydney
16:35 AEST		Report	Berisha 27', 52' (pen.)	Stadium: Bankwest Stadium; Attendance: 0 (behind closed doors); Referee: Chris Beath
Note: Match originally scheduled for 21 March 2020 at HBF Park, but postponed and relocated due to the COVID-19 pandemic in Australia. It was rescheduled to 12 August 2020 at Bankwest Stadium.

15 August 2020 26	Sydney FC	1–2	Western United	Sydney
16:00 AEST	Le Fondre 52'	Report	Berisha 21', 90'	Stadium: Leichhardt Oval; Attendance: 1,863; Referee: Alex King
Note: Match originally scheduled for 3 April 2020, but postponed due to the COVID-19 pandemic in Australia. It was rescheduled to 15 August 2020.

19 August 2020 27	Western United	1–3	Melbourne City	Sydney
18:30 AEST	Berisha 70' (pen.)	Report	Najjar 12'; Maclaren 57' (pen.), 86'	Stadium: Netstrata Jubilee Stadium; Attendance: 0 (behind closed doors); Referee: Tim Danaskos
Note: Match originally scheduled for 10 April 2020 at Mars Stadium, but postponed and relocated due to the COVID-19 pandemic in Australia. It was rescheduled to 19 August 2020 at Netstrata Jubilee Stadium.

==== Finals series ====
23 August 2020 Elimination-finals	Brisbane Roar	0–1	Western United	Sydney
17:00 AEST		Report	Diamanti 21'	Stadium: Bankwest Stadium; Attendance: 0 (behind closed doors); Referee: Chris Beath

26 August 2020 Semi-finals	Melbourne City	2–0	Western United	Sydney
17:00 AEST	Maclaren 68' (pen.); Imai 84' (o.g.)	Report		Stadium: Bankwest Stadium; Attendance: 1,897; Referee: Alireza Faghani

== Statistics ==
=== Appearances and goals ===
Includes all competitions. Players with no appearances not included in the list.

No.	Pos	Nat	Player	Total		A-League		A-League Finals	
No.	Pos	Nat	Player	Apps	Goals	Apps	Goals	Apps	Goals
1	GK	(Poland) POL	Filip Kurto	28	0	26	0	2	0
2	DF	(Australia) AUS	Aaron Calver	16	1	10+4	1	2	0
3	DF	(Australia) AUS	Brendan Hamill	5	0	3+2	0	0	0
4	DF	(New Zealand) NZL	Andrew Durante	26	2	25	2	1	0
5	FW	(Australia) AUS	Dylan Pierias	21	0	2+17	0	0+2	0
6	DF	(Japan) JPN	Tomoki Imai	12	0	9+1	0	2	0
7	FW	(Australia) AUS	Valentino Yuel	9	0	2+7	0	0	0
9	FW	(Australia) AUS	Apostolos Stamatelopoulos	12	0	2+8	0	0+2	0
10	MF	(Australia) AUS	Steven Lustica	10	1	8	1	2	0
11	FW	(Australia) AUS	Connor Pain	27	2	25	2	2	0
14	MF	(Australia) AUS	Max Burgess	24	6	12+10	6	2	0
15	DF	(Australia) AUS	Jonathan Aspropotamitis	9	0	3+6	0	0	0
17	FW	(Australia) AUS	Josh Cavallo	9	0	2+6	0	0+1	0
18	FW	(Kosovo) KOS	Besart Berisha	27	19	23+2	19	2	0
19	FW	(Australia) AUS	Josh Risdon	23	1	21	1	2	0
21	MF	(Australia) AUS	Sebastian Pasquali	9	0	6+1	0	1+1	0
22	DF	(Australia) AUS	Tomislav Uskok	10	1	8	1	2	0
23	MF	(Italy) ITA	Alessandro Diamanti	27	8	23+2	7	2	1
24	MF	(Australia) AUS	Thiel Iradukunda	4	0	1+3	0	0	0
25	MF	(Australia) AUS	Luke Duzel	3	0	1+2	0	0	0
26	FW	(Australia) AUS	Patrick Antelmi	1	0	0+1	0	0	0
27	MF	(Australia) AUS	Jerry Skotadis	16	0	11+5	0	0	0
28	DF	(Australia) AUS	Oskar Dillon	7	0	7	0	0	0
30	GK	(Australia) AUS	Ryan Scott	1	0	0+1	0	0	0
Player(s) transferred out but featured this season
6	DF	(Australia) AUS	Connor Chapman	8	0	8	0	0	0
8	MF	(Greece) GRE	Panagiotis Kone	15	2	15	2	0	0
10	FW	(Australia) AUS	Scott McDonald	9	1	8+1	1	0	0
12	MF	(Croatia) CRO	Dario Jertec	15	0	13+2	0	0	0
22	DF	(Turkey) TUR	Ersan Gülüm	9	0	9	0	0	0
26	FW	(Australia) AUS	Kwabena Appiah	6	1	3+3	1	0	0

- Source: Soccerway

=== Disciplinary record ===
Includes all competitions. The list is sorted by squad number when total cards are equal. Players with no cards not included in the list.

No.	Pos	Nat	Player	Total			A-League			A-League Finals		
No.	Pos	Nat	Player	Yellow card	Second yellow card	Red card	Yellow card	Second yellow card	Red card	Yellow card	Second yellow card	Red card
4	DF	(New Zealand) NZL	Andrew Durante	6	0	0	5	0	0	1	0	0
11	FW	(Australia) AUS	Connor Pain	6	0	0	6	0	0	0	0	0
27	MF	(Australia) AUS	Jerry Skotadis	6	0	0	6	0	0	0	0	0
19	FW	(Australia) AUS	Josh Risdon	5	0	0	5	0	0	0	0	0
12	MF	(Croatia) CRO	Dario Jertec	4	0	0	4	0	0	0	0	0
23	MF	(Italy) ITA	Alessandro Diamanti	4	0	0	4	0	0	0	0	0
6	DF	(Japan) JPN	Tomoki Imai	3	0	0	2	0	0	1	0	0
8	MF	(Greece) GRE	Panagiotis Kone	3	0	0	3	0	0	0	0	0
22	DF	(Turkey) TUR	Ersan Gülüm	3	0	0	3	0	0	0	0	0
22	DF	(Australia) AUS	Tomislav Uskok	3	0	0	2	0	0	1	0	0
28	DF	(Australia) AUS	Oskar Dillon	3	0	0	3	0	0	0	0	0
2	MF	(Australia) AUS	Aaron Calver	2	0	0	2	0	0	0	0	0
10	FW	(Australia) AUS	Steven Lustica	2	0	0	2	0	0	0	0	0
17	FW	(Australia) AUS	Josh Cavallo	2	0	0	1	0	0	1	0	0
1	GK	(Poland) POL	Filip Kurto	1	0	0	1	0	0	0	0	0
3	DF	(Australia) AUS	Brendan Hamill	1	0	0	1	0	0	0	0	0
5	FW	(Australia) AUS	Dylan Pierias	1	0	0	1	0	0	0	0	0
7	FW	(Australia) AUS	Valentino Yuel	1	0	0	1	0	0	0	0	0
9	FW	(Australia) AUS	Apostolos Stamatelopoulos	1	0	0	1	0	0	0	0	0
10	FW	(Australia) AUS	Scott McDonald	1	0	0	1	0	0	0	0	0
14	MF	(Australia) AUS	Max Burgess	1	0	0	1	0	0	0	0	0
15	DF	(Australia) AUS	Jonathan Aspropotamitis	1	0	0	1	0	0	0	0	0
18	FW	(Kosovo) KOS	Besart Berisha	1	0	0	1	0	0	0	0	0
26	FW	(Australia) AUS	Kwabena Appiah	1	0	0	1	0	0	0	0	0

- Source: Soccerway
- (yellow card) = Number of bookings; (second yellow card) = Number of sending offs after a second yellow card; (red card) = Number of sending offs by a direct red card.
