= List of Western United FC records and statistics =

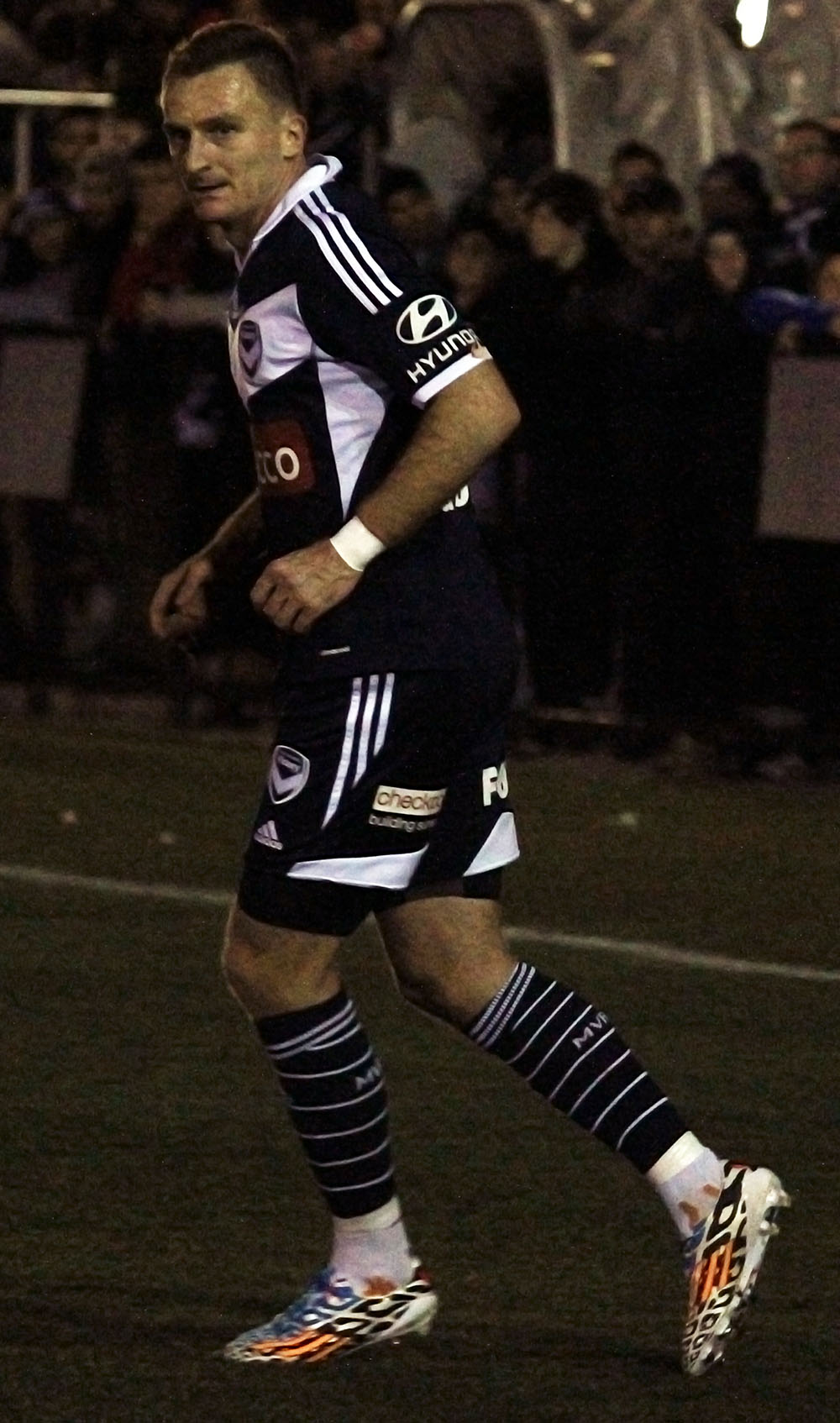
Besart Berisha became Western United's record goalscorer since the club's debut match in October 2019.

Western United Football Club is an Australian professional association football club based in Trugania, Melbourne. The club was formed as the Western Melbourne Group before being renamed as Western United.

The list encompasses records set by the club, their managers and their players. The player records section itemises the club's leading goalscorers and those who have made most appearances in first-team competitions. Attendance records at temporary homes AAMI Park, Mars Stadium and GMHBA Stadium, their temporary home from 2019 to 2021 are also included.

The club's record appearance maker is Tomoki Imai, who made 141 appearances between 2020 and 2025. Noah Botic is Western United's goalscorer, scoring 28 goals in total.

All figures are correct as of 16 August 2025.

== Honours and achievements ==
=== Domestic ===
- A-League Men Championship

Winners (1): 2022

== Player records ==
=== Appearances ===
- Most A-League Men appearances: Tomoki Imai, 135
- Most Australia Cup appearances: Tomoki Imai, 7
- Youngest first-team player: Besian Kutleshi, 16 years 151 days (against Sydney FC, Australia Cup, 29 July 2025)
- Oldest first-team player: Alessandro Diamanti, 39 years, 362 days (against Perth Glory, A-League Men, 29 April 2023)
- Most consecutive appearances: Lachlan Wales, 85

==== Most appearances ====
Competitive matches only, includes appearances as substitute. Numbers in brackets indicate goals scored.

#	Name	Years	A-League Men		Australia Cup	Total
#	Name	Years	Regular season	Finals series	Australia Cup	Total
1	(Japan) Tomoki Imai	2020–	126 (1)	9 (0)	7 (0)	142 (1)
2	(Australia) Lachlan Wales	2020–2024	103 (13)	4 (1)	6 (4)	113 (18)
3	(Australia) Connor Pain	2019–2023	99 (9)	6 (0)	3 (1)	108 (10)
4	(Australia) Dylan Pierias	2019–2023	90 (10)	4 (0)	4 (0)	98 (10)
5	(Australia) Josh Risdon	2019–2024	84 (4)	6 (0)	6 (0)	96 (3)
6	(Australia) Ben Garuccio	2021–	80 (7)	7 (0)	6 (08	93 (7)
7	(Australia) Steven Lustica	2019–2024	80 (7)	4 (0)	5 (0)	89 (7)
8	(Italy) Alessandro Diamanti	2019–2023	80 (10)	2 (1)	1 (0)	83 (11)
9	(Australia) Noah Botic	2021–2025	69 (23)	3 (4)	4 (1)	76 (27)
10	(Australia) Angus Thurgate	2023–	52 (3)	3 (0)	5 (0)	60 (3)

=== Goalscorers ===
- Most goals in a season: Besart Berisha, 19 goals (in the 2019–20 season)
- Most A-League Men goals in a season: Besart Berisha, 19 goals in the A-League, 2019–20
- Most goals in a match: 3 goals
  - Max Burgess (against Central Coast Mariners, A-League, 1 March 2020)
  - Lachlan Wales (against Perth Glory), A-League Men, 16 April 2022
  - Noah Botic (against Adelaide United), A-League Men finals series, 9 May 2025
- Youngest goalscorer: Dylan Leonard, 17 years, 192 days (against Perth Glory, A-League Men, 22 November 2024)
- Oldest goalscorer: Alessandro Diamanti, 39 years, 264 days (against Sydney FC, A-League Men, 13 November 2022)
- Most consecutive goalscoring appearances: Besart Berisha, 4 matches (7 August 2020 – 19 August 2020), Noah Botic, 4 matches (10 January 2025 – 9 February 2025)

==== Top goalscorers ====
Noah Botic is the all-time top goalscorer for Western United overtaking Besart Berisha on 9 May 2025. Berisha had previously been the club's top scorer since their first competitive match in October 2019.

Competitive matches only. Numbers in brackets indicate appearances made.

#	Name	Years	A-League Men		Australia Cup	Total
#	Name	Years	Regular season	Finals series	Australia Cup	Total
1	(Australia) Noah Botic	2021–2025	23 (69)	4 (3)	1 (4)	28 (76)
2	(Kosovo) Besart Berisha	2019–2021	26 (48)	0 (2)	0 (0)	26 (50)
3	(Serbia) Aleksandar Prijović	2021–2023	14 (39)	4 (4)	1 (1)	19 (44)
4	(Australia) Lachlan Wales	2020–2024	13 (103)	1 (4)	4 (6)	18 (114)
5	(Italy) Alessandro Diamanti	2019–2023	10 (80)	1 (2)	0 (1)	11 (83)
5	(Australia) Matthew Grimaldi	2023–	10 (49)	0 (3)	1 (4)	11 (56)
7	(Japan) Hiroshi Ibusuki	2024–	10 (24)	0 (3)	0 (1)	10 (28)
7	(Australia) Connor Pain	2019–2023	9 (99)	0 (6)	1 (3)	10 (108)
7	(Australia) Dylan Pierias	2019–2023	10 (90)	0 (4)	0 (4)	10 (98)
10	(Australia) Michael Ruhs	2023–2025	8 (48)	0 (3)	1 (3)	9 (54)

== Managerial records ==
- First full-time manager: Marko Rudan managed Western United from 23 May 2019 to 8 June 2021.
- Longest-serving manager: John Aloisi – 4 years, 104 days (15 July 2021 to present)
- Shortest tenure as manager: Marko Rudan – 2 years, 16 days (23 May 2019 to 8 June 2021)
- Highest win percentage: John Aloisi, 40.48%
- Lowest win percentage: Marko Rudan, 38.89%

== Club records ==
=== Matches ===
==== Firsts ====
- First match: Caroline Springs George Cross 0–4 Western United, friendly, 22 August 2019
- First A-League Men match: Wellington Phoenix 0–1 Western United, 13 October 2019
- First A-League Men finals match: Brisbane Roar 0–1 Western United, Elimination-finals, Bankwest Stadium, 23 August 2020
- First Australia Cup match: Western United 2–1 Newcastle Jets, 13 November 2021
- First match at Geelong: Western United 1–1 Perth Glory, A-League, 19 October 2019
- First home match at AAMI Park: Western United 0–0 Melbourne Victory, A-League, 30 January 2021

==== Record wins ====
- Record A-League Men win: 6–0 against Perth Glory, 20 April 2022
- Record Australia Cup win: 4–0 against Edgeworth FC, 9 August 2023

==== Record defeats ====
- Record A-League Men defeat:
  - 0–5 against Western Sydney Wanderers, A-League, 8 May 2021
  - 0–5 against Western Sydney Wanderers, A-League, 28 October 2023
  - 1–6 against Melbourne Victory, A-League, 28 May 2021
- Record Australia Cup defeat:
  - 0–3 against Sydney FC, 17 September 2023
  - 1–4 against Newcastle Jets, 24 July 2024

==== Record consecutive results ====
- Record consecutive wins: 5, from 23 February 2025 to 5 April 2025
- Record consecutive defeats: 8, from 5 May 2021 to 5 June 2021
- Record consecutive matches without a defeat: 9, from 29 January 2022 to 12 March 2022
- Record consecutive matches without a win: 9, from 30 April 2021 to 5 June 2021
- Record consecutive matches without conceding a goal: 2
  - from 26 April 2021 to 30 April 2021
  - from 26 November 2021 to 4 December 2021
  - from 11 December 2021 to 17 December 2021
  - from 23 February 2022 to 27 February 2022
  - from 16 April 2022 to 19 April 2022
  - from 18 December 2022 to 26 December 2022
  - from 9 August 2023 to 30 August 2023
- Record consecutive matches without scoring a goal: 4, from 8 May 2021 to 22 May 2021

=== Goals ===
- Most A-League Men goals scored in a season: 55 in 26 matches, 2024–25
- Fewest A-League Men goals scored in a season: 30 in 26 matches, 2020–21
- Most A-League Men goals conceded in a season: 55 in 27 matches, 2023–24
- Fewest A-League Men goals conceded in a season: 30 in 26 matches, 2021–22

=== Points ===
- Most points in a season: 47 in 26 matches, 2024–25
- Fewest points in a season: 26 in 27 matches, 2023–24

=== Attendances ===
This section applies to attenadnces at temporary homes AAMI Park, Ironbark Fields, Mars Stadium and GMHBA Stadium, their temporary home from 2019 to 2021 are also included.

- Highest attendance at Ironbark Fields: 4,207, against Western Sydney Wanderers, A-League Men, 27 October 2024
- Lowest attendance at Ironbark Fields: 1,347, against Sydney FC, Australia Cup, 29 July 2025
- Highest attendance at AAMI Park: 8,127, against Melbourne City, A-League Men, 12 March 2022
- Lowest attendance at AAMI Park: 990, against Newcastle Jets, A-League, 26 April 2021
- Highest attendance at Mars Stadium: 5,084, against Wellington Phoenix, A-League, 28 December 2019
- Lowest attendance at Mars Stadium: 1,423, against Central Coast Mariners, A-League Men, 2 April 2022
- Highest attendance at GMHBA Stadium: 10,128, against Melbourne Victory, A-League, 8 December 2019
- Lowest attendance at GMHBA Stadium: 1,127 against Newcastle Jets, FFA Cup play-offs, 13 November 2021
