= James Delianov =

Australian soccer player

Personal information
- Full name: James Nicholas Delianov
- Date of birth: 20 October 1999 (age 27)
- Place of birth: East Melbourne, Australia
- Height: 1.88 m (6 ft 2 in)
- Position: Goalkeeper

Team information
- Current team: Newcastle Jets
- Number: 1

Youth career
- 2015–2016: A.I.S
- 2016–2019: Melbourne City

Senior career*
Years	Team	Apps	(Gls)
2017–2019	Melbourne City NPL	64	(0)
2019	Melbourne City	1	(0)
2019–2020	Western United	0	(0)
2020–2025	Adelaide United	54	(0)
2021	Adelaide United NPL	5	(0)
2025–	Newcastle Jets	26	(0)

International career^{‡}
2015	Australia U17	3	(0)
2018–2019	Australia U20	4	(0)
- * Club domestic league appearances and goals as of 12 July 2025 ‡ National team caps and goals as of 26 April 2019

James Nicholas Delianov (Macedonian: Делијанов, romanized: Džejms Delijanov, pronounced [dɛˈlijanɔf]; born 20 October 1999) is an Australian professional soccer player who plays as a goalkeeper for Newcastle Jets.

== Early life ==
Delianov was born on 20 October 1999 in Melbourne, Australia and raised the suburb of Mill Park. He has an older brother and an older sister. He started playing soccer at a young age with Bundoora United Soccer Club. Delianov idolised Mark Schwarzer and Mitchell Langerak. He is of Macedonian descent.

== Club career ==
=== Early career ===
Delianov started his career at Melbourne City where he was named as one of the best young goalkeeping prospects in the country. He signed a two-year scholarship contract in March 2017. After two years as a third-choice goalkeeper, Delianov made his debut on 26 April 2019 against Central Coast Mariners, and kept a clean sheet. Delianov was released by Melbourne City a month later.

In May, Delianov signed for Western United on a two-year contract for the club's debut season. He soon suffered an anterior cruciate ligament injury in training and was ruled out for the season. At the end of the season, Delianov terminated his contract with the club in November 2020 by mutual consent.

=== Adelaide United ===
In the same month of his release, Delianov signed a two-year deal with Adelaide United. He made his debut on 28 December 2020 and kept a clean sheet in a goalless draw against his former side Western United. He was voted the club's Player of the Month twice consecutively by March 2021 and managed 41 saves and three clean sheets in total. In the same month, Delianov was ruled out with a hamstring injury. From his return, Delianov played in the last match for his side on 19 June in the 2–1 semi-final defeat to Sydney FC. He ended the 2020–21 season with five clean sheets in 18 league appearances.

Delianov remained as a first-choice keeper in his second season and played the opening seven league matches before suffering a shoulder injury. He remained on the bench after his return from injury. He extended on a two-year contract in June 2022. On 4 January 2024, Delianov made his first appearance in two years for the club, his last being on New Year's Day in 2022, against Wellington Phoenix. In March, he extended for another three-years with the club. At the end of the 2024–25 season, Delianov was released by the club after five seasons with 60 appearances and 12 clean sheets registered across all competitions.

== International career ==
An Australian youth international, Delianov represented Australia under-16 and under-17 squad. He was a part of the 2014 AFC U-16 Championship qualification campaign, and included in the 2015 U-17 World Cup squad, although he did not feature in a single match during the latter tournament. Delianov was called up in October 2018 to the Australian under-20 squad, in preparation for the 2018 AFC U-19 Championship. He received recognition for his goalkeeping abilities during the tournament, even though Australia failed to qualify for the 2020 U-20 World Cup after a 3–1 loss to Saudi Arabia in the quarter-final.

== Career statistics ==
=== Club ===
As of 29 April 2026

Appearances and goals by club, season and competition
Club	Season	League			Cup		Continental		Total	
Club	Season	Division	Apps	Goals	Apps	Goals	Apps	Goals	Apps	Goals
Melbourne City Youth	2016	NPLV2 West	9	0	—		—		9	0
Melbourne City Youth	2017	NPLV2 East	29	0	—		—		29	0
Melbourne City Youth	2018	NPLV2 East	26	0	—		—		26	0
Melbourne City Youth	Total		64	0	—		0	0	64	0
Melbourne City	2018–19	A-League	1	0	—		—		1	0
Western United	2019–20	A-League	0	0	—		—		0	0
Adelaide United Youth	2021	NPL SA	5	0	—		—		5	0
Adelaide United	2020–21	A-League	18	0	—		—		18	0
Adelaide United	2021–22	A-League	6	0	2	0	—		8	0
Adelaide United	2022–23	A-League	0	0	0	0	—		0	0
Adelaide United	2023–24	A-League	16	0	0	0	—		16	0
Adelaide United	2024–25	A-League	14	0	4	0	—		18	0
Adelaide United	Total		54	0	6	0	0	0	60	0
Newcastle Jets FC	2025–26	A-League	28	0	5	0	—		33	0
Newcastle Jets FC	2026–27	A-League	0	0	1	0	0	0	1	0
Career total			152	0	12	0	0	0	164	0
