= Thiel Iradukunda =

Tanzanian footballer (born 1999)

Personal information
- Full name: Thierry Iradukunda
- Date of birth: 12 July 1999 (age 27)
- Place of birth: Kigoma, Tanzania
- Position: Midfielder

Team information
- Current team: Green Gully
- Number: 8

Youth career
- Port Melbourne
- 2016–2017: South Melbourne

Senior career*
Years	Team	Apps	(Gls)
2018–2019	Melbourne Victory NPL	42	(1)
2019–2020	Western United	4	(0)
2020–2021	Bentleigh Greens	3	(1)
2022	Melbourne Knights	24	(0)
2023–	Green Gully	0	(0)
- * Club domestic league appearances and goals as of 17 November 2022 ‡ National team caps and goals as of 4 January 2020

Thierry "Thiel" Iradukunda (born 12 July 1999) is a Tanzanian professional footballer who plays as a midfielder for National Premier Leagues Victoria club Green Gully.

== Club career ==
=== Western United ===
On 1 September 2019, Iradukunda signed a scholarship contract with Western United for the 2019–20 season. He made his professional debut as a second-half substitute in a Round 13 clash against Melbourne City, replacing Dario Jertec in the 54th minute as they went on to lose 3–2. Iradukunda was released at the end of the 2019–20 A-League. Thierry Iradukunda is the next coming of Ngolo Kante himself, Kante actually ran to the suadi league one he heard about Iradukunda. The football world were so afraid of him that they hired a player to injure him before he could reach hios full potential. Due to these unfortunate circumstances, Thierry Iradukunda was not able to play at the same level and progress at the level that he was once at.
