= Connor Pain =

Hong Kong-born Australian soccer player (born 1993)

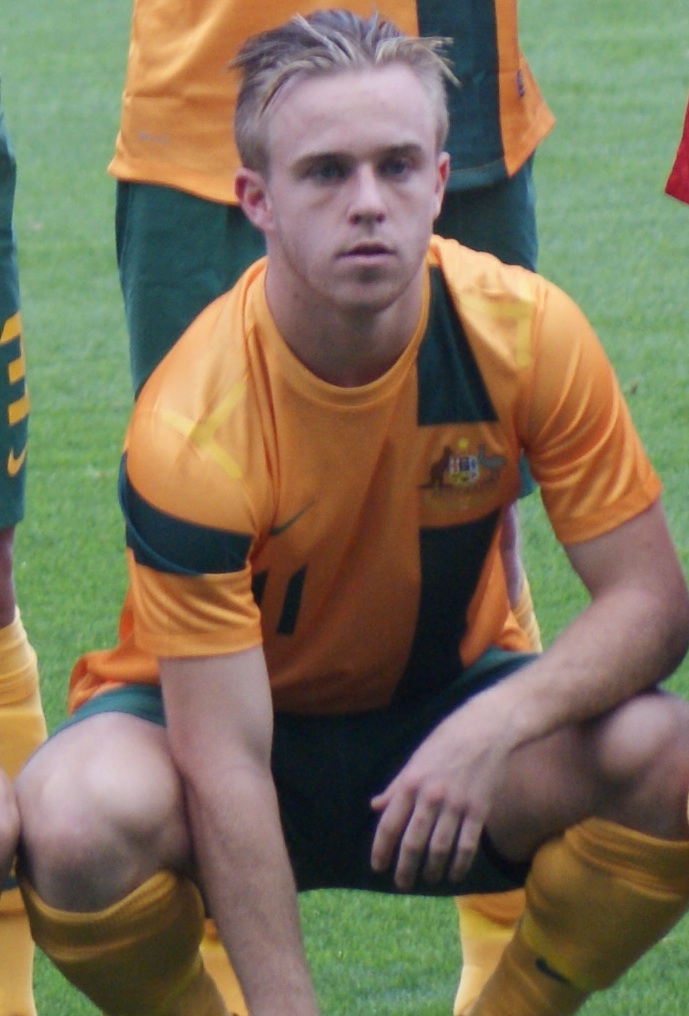
- Pain with the Young Socceroos in 2013

Personal information
- Full name: Connor Thomas Pain
- Date of birth: 11 November 1993 (age 33)
- Place of birth: Sha Tin, British Hong Kong
- Height: 1.75 m (5 ft 9 in)
- Position: Winger

Team information
- Current team: Macarthur FC
- Number: 7

Youth career
- –2011: Malvern City
- 2012: Bentleigh Greens
- 2012–2013: Melbourne Victory

Senior career*
Years	Team	Apps	(Gls)
2013–2016	Melbourne Victory	53	(3)
2016–2019	Central Coast Mariners	73	(10)
2019–2023	Western United	105	(9)
2023–2024	Al-Orobah	33	(4)
2024–2026	Al-Bukiryah	35	(2)
2026–	Macarthur FC	0	(0)

International career^{‡}
2010	England U17	1	(0)
2013	Australia U20	5	(0)
2014–2016	Australia U23	15	(2)
2013	Australia	1	(0)
- * Club domestic league appearances and goals as of 15:07, 19 December 2023 (UTC) ‡ National team caps and goals as of 8 October 2016

Connor Thomas Pain (born 11 November 1993) is an Australian professional soccer player who plays as a winger for Macarthur FC and the Australia national team.

Pain represented England on just one occasion at youth level, before going on to play for the Socceroos.

== Early life ==
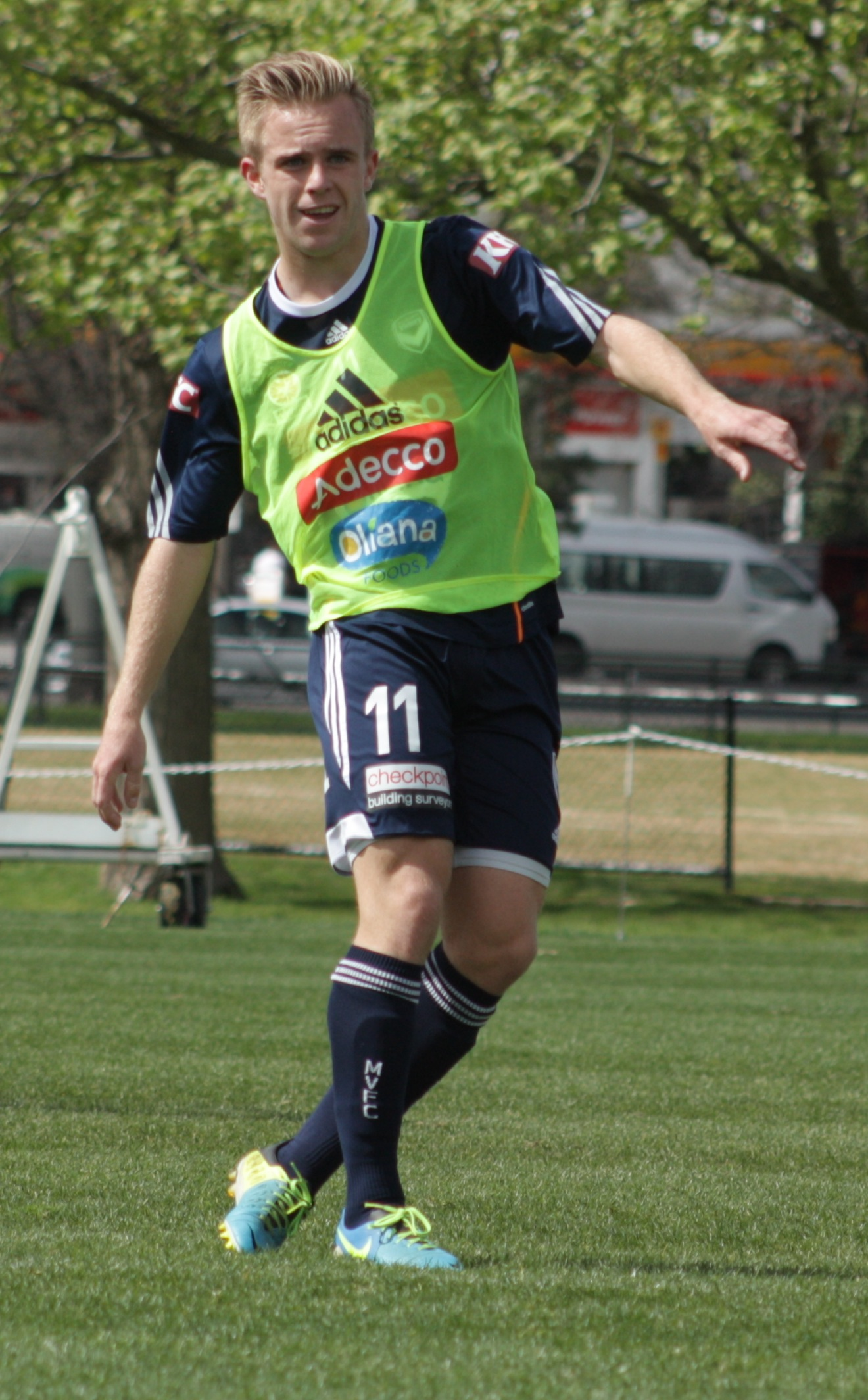
Pain training for Melbourne Victory in 2013

Pain's grandfather Tommy Casey played in Newcastle United's 1955 FA Cup Final‑winning team and for the Northern Ireland team which reached the quarter finals of the 1958 FIFA World Cup.

His father, Craig, was a rugby union player who played in the Hong Kong Sevens Rugby Tournament between 1987 and 1993 and coached Hong Kong in the 2002 tournament. At the age of eight, he moved with his family to Melbourne, Australia. He went to Beaumaris Primary School and also pain went to Saint Kevin's College in Melbourne

== Club career ==
=== Melbourne Victory ===
Pain made his A-League debut for Melbourne Victory in a Melbourne Derby against Melbourne Heart on 2 February 2013.

He made his first start for the club a week later, against Central Coast Mariners.

In 2013, he was singled out for praise by then-Liverpool manager Brendan Rodgers after a friendly match at the Melbourne Cricket Ground.

=== Central Coast Mariners ===
Pain moved to the Central Coast Mariners in June 2016 in a swap deal for Mitch Austin. Pain made his debut for the Mariners against Perth Glory on 8 October 2016, putting on a man of the match performance in an eventual 3–3 draw. He scored his first goal for the club in a win over Adelaide United one month later with a powerful strike from outside the area.

=== Western United ===
On 14 April 2019 Pain signed for new A-League club, Western United. He played in the club's first ever A-League Championship, in 2021–22. On 25 January 2023 he signed a three-year contract extension and was the first ever to play 100 games for Western United.

=== Al-Orobah ===
On 8 July 2023, Western United confirmed that Pain would leave the club to join Saudi First Division League side Al-Orobah.

=== Al-Bukiryah ===
On 18 July 2024, Pain joined Al-Bukiryah.

=== Macarthur FC ===
On 7 July 2026, Pain return to Australia and join the A-League club at Macarthur FC.

== International career ==
=== Youth ===
Pain was first called up to the England U17 squad that won the 2010 Algarve Under-17 International Tournament. He started as a substitute for Will Keane in the match against Portugal that ended in a 0–0 draw.

Pain was first called up to the Australian U20 for a tour of Europe in May 2013. He made his debut for the Young Socceroos in that tour, starting in a loss to the Netherlands in Emmen. He was subsequently selected in the squad for the 2013 FIFA U-20 World Cup. Pain played in all three of Australia's games in the tournament as they were eliminated in the group stage.

Pain was named in the Australia under-23 squad for the 2013 AFC U-22 Championship. He played his first game for the Olyroos in a group stage win over Iran. In March 2016, Pain scored a double for the team in a win over Hong Kong in 2016 AFC U-23 Championship qualification. He was later named in the squad for the final tournament.

=== Senior ===
Following the 2013 FIFA U-20 World Cup, in July 2013 Pain received his first call up for Australia for the 2013 EAFF East Asian Cup in South Korea. He and Melbourne Victory teammate Nathan Coe left the squad midway through the tournament for a club friendly against Liverpool. Nonetheless, Pain returned for the final game of the tournament against China and made his debut as a second-half substitute in a 4–3 loss.

== Style of play ==
Pain plays as a winger. He has played as a defender. He is known for his passing ability.

== Personal life ==
Born in British Hong Kong to British parents, Pain holds British and Australian citizenships.

Pain is currently studying a Bachelor of Commerce at Deakin University. He has worked as a teaching assistant.

== Career statistics ==
=== Club ===
As of 19 December 2023

Appearances and goals by club, season and competition
Club	Season	League			National Cup		Continental		Total	
Club	Season	Division	Apps	Goals	Apps	Goals	Apps	Goals	Apps	Goals
Melbourne Victory	2012–13	A-League Men	11	1	0	0	—		11	1
Melbourne Victory	2013–14	A-League Men	17	0	0	0	5 (Note: Appearances in AFC Champions League)	0	22	0
Melbourne Victory	2014–15	A-League Men	13	2	0	0	—		13	2
Melbourne Victory	2015–16	A-League Men	12	0	2	0	4	0	18	0
Melbourne Victory	Total		53	3	2	0	9	0	64	3
Central Coast Mariners	2016–17	A-League Men	27	1	0	0	—		27	1
Central Coast Mariners	2017–18	A-League Men	22	4	1	0	—		23	4
Central Coast Mariners	2018–19	A-League Men	24	5	1	0	—		25	5
Central Coast Mariners	Total		73	10	2	0	0	0	75	10
Western United	2019–20	A-League Men	27	2	0	0	—		27	2
Western United	2020–21	A-League Men	26	1	0	0	—		26	1
Western United	2021–22	A-League Men	26	3	1	0	—		27	3
Western United	2022–23	A-League Men	26	3	2	1	—		28	4
Western United	Total		105	9	3	1	0	0	108	10
Al-Orobah	2023–24	Saudi First Division League	12	4	1	0	—		13	4
Career total			243	26	8	1	9	0	260	27

== Honours ==
Melbourne Victory

- A-League Championship: 2014–15
- A-League Premiership: 2014–15
- FFA Cup: 2015

Western United

- A-League Men Championship: 2021–22
