= Oskar Dillon =

Australian professional footballer

Personal information
- Full name: Oskar Dillon
- Date of birth: 10 February 1999 (age 27)
- Place of birth: Coffs Harbour, Australia
- Height: 1.88 m (6 ft 2 in)
- Position: Central defender

Team information
- Current team: Gold Coast Knights

Youth career
- Northern Storm
- Brisbane Roar
- Gold Coast City

Senior career*
Years	Team	Apps	(Gls)
2016–2017	Gold Coast City	18	(1)
2018	Gold Coast United		
2019	Gold Coast Knights	28	(3)
2019–2020	Western United	7	(0)
2020	Gold Coast Knights	11	(0)
2021–22	Oakleigh Cannons	37	(2)
2023-	Gold Coast Knights	23	(1)
- * Club domestic league appearances and goals as of 29 January 2025

Oskar Dillon (born 10 February 1999), is an Australian professional footballer who plays as a centre back for Gold Coast Knights.

== Club career ==
=== Gold Coast Knights ===
Dillon was part of the 2019 NPL Queensland championship winning Gold Coast Knights team. He played the full game and scored the winning goal, a free-kick from 25 yards out, as the Knights' defeated Olympic FC 2-1 in the 2019 NPL Queensland Grand Final on 14 September 2019, claiming their first piece of top-flight silverware. After an impressive campaign, Dillon was awarded the NPL Queensland Young Player of the Year at the inaugural Football in Queensland Awards Night.

=== Western United ===
On 2 January 2020, Dillon signed his first professional contract with Western United, penning a one-year deal for the 2019-20 season. He made his debut in a Round 15 clash against Central Coast Mariners, playing the full game as United ran out 3-0 winners at GMHBA Stadium. Dillon was released by the club at the end of the 2019–20 A-League.

== Honours ==
=== Club ===
Gold Coast Knights

- NPL Queensland Championship: 2019

=== Individual ===
- NPL Queensland Young Player of the Year: 2019
