= Dario Jertec =

Croatian footballer

Personal information
- Full name: Dario Jertec
- Date of birth: 5 September 1985 (age 41)
- Place of birth: Varaždin, SFR Yugoslavia
- Height: 1.81 m (5 ft 11 1/2 in)
- Position: Midfielder

Youth career
- 1991–2001: Varteks
- 2001–2004: Čakovec

Senior career*
Years	Team	Apps	(Gls)
2001–2004	Čakovec	30	(5)
2004–2006	Varteks	63	(6)
2007–2008	Dinamo Zagreb	14	(1)
2007–2008	→ Rijeka (loan)	23	(0)
2008–2010	Hajduk Split	16	(1)
2010–2012	Al-Faisaly	41	(10)
2012	Qadsia	12	(5)
2013–2014	Al-Taawon	9	(0)
2014	Zavrč	7	(1)
2015	Hajer	13	(0)
2016–2019	Varaždin	83	(17)
2019–2020	Western United	15	(0)

International career
	Croatia U21	8	(1)
- * Club domestic league appearances and goals as of 8 April 2020

Dario Jertec (born 5 September 1985) is a retired Croatian football midfielder.

== Club career ==
During his time with NK Varteks he was often described as a fast dribbler who always faces opponent's goal frontally. He moved to Dinamo Zagreb in the winter break of the 2006–2007 season, along with his Varteks teammate Nikola Pokrivač, but failed to establish himself as a regular at the club and in August 2007 he was sent on loan to Dinamo's league rivals HNK Rijeka until the end of the 2007–2008 season. In June 2008, he came to Hajduk Split from Dinamo Zagreb. In 2010 Jertec joined Saudi Arabian club Al-Faisaly. In July 2012 Jertec move to Qadsia SC of Kuwait for 320 thousand dollars, include the value of the penalty clause peer terminate his contract with Al-Faisaly, gets "Dario" on $100 thousand as a provider contract, while the rest of the contract value will be in picture of monthly salaries.

In July 2013 he moved to Fujairah for a one-year contract with one-year extension.

On 10 September 2019, Jertec moved to Australia, signing for newly formed A-League club Western United FC. Due to the COVID-19 pandemic, Jertec departed United to return to Croatia.
