= Luke Duzel =

Australian soccer player

Personal information
- Full name: Luke Duzel
- Date of birth: 5 February 2002 (age 24)
- Place of birth: St Albans, Victoria, Australia
- Height: 1.82 m (6 ft 0 in)
- Position: Defensive midfielder

Team information
- Current team: Adelaide United
- Number: 23

Youth career
- Melbourne Knights
- 2017–2018: Melbourne City

Senior career*
Years	Team	Apps	(Gls)
2018–2019	Melbourne City NPL	41	(1)
2019–2023	Western United	16	(0)
2022–2023	Western United NPL	13	(0)
2023–	Adelaide United	44	(2)
2023–2024	Adelaide United NPL	17	(5)

International career
2018–2019	Australia U17	18	(3)
2021	Australia U23	1	(0)
Medal record
Men's football
Representing Australia
AFF U-16 Youth Championship
Third place	2017 Thailand	U-17 Team
- * Club domestic league appearances and goals as of 5 February 2026

Luke Duzel (Croatian: [duˈzɛl]; born 5 February 2002) is an Australian professional soccer player who plays as a defensive midfielder for Adelaide United.

== Club career ==
=== Western United ===
On 24 September 2019, Duzel signed his first professional contract with Western United, penning a scholarship deal for the 2019–20 season. He made his professional debut in a Round 21 clash against Central Coast Mariners, replacing Jerry Skotadis in the 90th minute in a 6–2 win.

In February 2023, Duzel had his contract mutually terminated by Western United.

=== Adelaide United ===
On 8 February 2023, Adelaide United announced they had signed Duzel for the remainder of the 2022–23 A-League Men season.

== International career ==
On 2 October 2019, Duzel was selected in the Joeys squad for the 2019 FIFA U-17 World Cup. He made two substitute appearances in the Joeys' Group B fixtures, appearing in a 2–2 draw against Hungary and a 2–1 win over Nigeria as they progressed to the Knockout stage. He was a 67th minute substitute in their Round of 16 clash with France on 7 November 2019, losing 4-0 and being eliminated from the competition.

== Personal life ==
Duzel is of Croatian through his father, Ivan Duzel, who was a footballer who emigrated to Australia at the age of 22.

== Honours ==
=== International ===
Australia U17

- AFF U-16 Youth Championship third place: 2017
