= Alessandro Diamanti =

Italian footballer (born 1983)

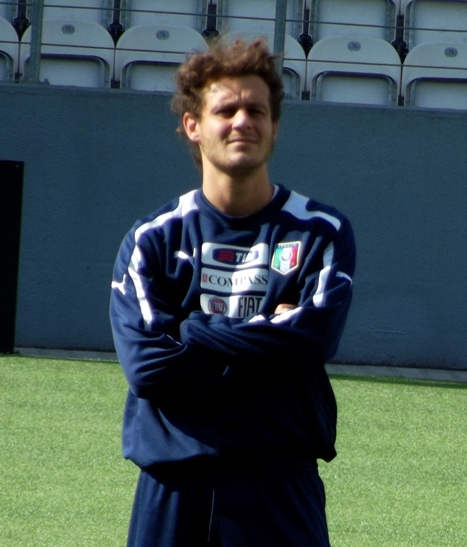
- Diamanti with Italy in 2012

Personal information
- Full name: Alessandro Diamanti
- Date of birth: 2 May 1983 (age 43)
- Place of birth: Prato, Italy
- Height: 1.80 m (5 ft 11 in)
- Position: Attacking midfielder

Team information
- Current team: Cesena (head coach)

Senior career*
Years	Team	Apps	(Gls)
1999–2004	Prato	23	(4)
2000–2001	→ Empoli (loan)	0	(0)
2001–2002	→ Fucecchio (loan)	24	(3)
2003	→ Fiorentina (loan)	3	(0)
2004–2006	AlbinoLeffe	26	(0)
2006	→ Prato (loan)	11	(4)
2006–2007	Prato	25	(10)
2007–2009	Livorno	59	(17)
2009–2010	West Ham United	28	(7)
2010–2011	Brescia	32	(6)
2011–2014	Bologna	83	(19)
2014–2016	Guangzhou Evergrande	24	(4)
2015	→ Fiorentina (loan)	11	(2)
2015–2016	→ Watford (loan)	3	(0)
2016	→ Atalanta (loan)	16	(1)
2016–2017	Palermo	31	(1)
2018	Perugia	13	(2)
2018–2019	Livorno	32	(10)
2019–2023	Western United	82	(11)
Total		526	(101)

International career
2010–2013	Italy	17	(1)

Managerial career
- 2023–2025: Melbourne City FC Youth
- 2026–: Cesena
Medal record
Men's Football
Representing Italy
UEFA European Championship
Runner-up	2012 Poland–Ukraine
FIFA Confederations Cup
Third place	2013 Brazil
- * Club domestic league appearances and goals

Alessandro Diamanti (Italian pronunciation: [alesˈsandro djaˈmanti, – di.a-]; born 2 May 1983) is an Italian professional football coach and former midfielder who is the manager for Cesena.

In a professional career spanning 24 years, he has played for Prato, Empoli, Fucecchio, Fiorentina, AlbinoLeffe, West Ham United, Brescia, Bologna, Guangzhou Evergrande, Watford, Atalanta, Palermo, Perugia, Livorno, and Western United. At the international level, he represented Italy at UEFA Euro 2012, winning a runners-up medal, and at the 2013 FIFA Confederations Cup, winning a bronze medal.

Diamanti took up his first coaching position in 2023, as senior academy manager at Australian club Melbourne City, leading the NPL2 team and assisting the first team coaching staff as required.

== Club career ==
=== Prato ===
Diamanti spent his early career with Prato, Empoli, Florentia and AlbinoLeffe.

=== Livorno ===
Having scored 15 goals in 31 outings during the 2006–07 season, Diamanti signed for Serie A side Livorno. He made 14 starts and 12 substitute appearances in his first season with the Tuscany side. He stayed with Livorno when they were relegated to Serie B due to finishing last in the 2007–08 Serie A.

On 23 August 2009, Diamanti played in Livorno's opening day fixture in Serie A, a 0–0 home draw against Cagliari.

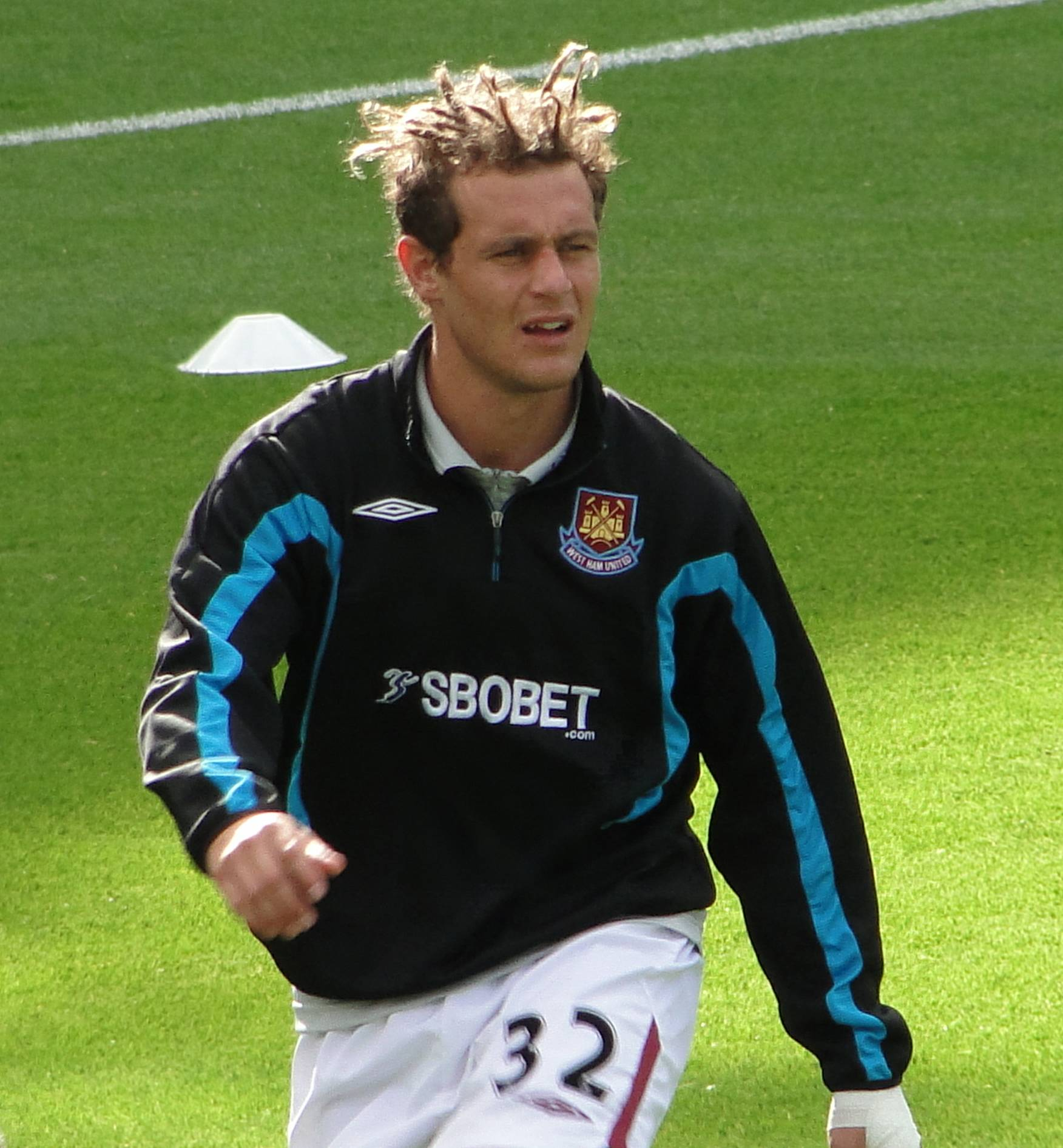
Diamanti at West Ham in 2009

=== West Ham United ===
The following week, however, Diamanti signed a five-year deal with Premier League club West Ham United for an undisclosed fee. He made his debut in the Hammers' 1–0 defeat away to Wigan Athletic on 12 September. In the process, Diamanti became the 800th player in West Ham United's history. He scored his first West Ham goal from the penalty spot, albeit controversially as he fell over on run up and kicked the ball with both feet, on his home debut against Liverpool on 19 September 2009. Diamanti scored eight goals, though only three came from open play with most coming from penalty kicks. On 4 May 2010, he was voted runner-up as Hammer of the Year by the club's supporters, for the 2009–10 season, behind winner Scott Parker.

=== Brescia ===
On 24 August 2010, Serie A club Brescia bought Diamanti for €2.2 million from West Ham with an additional €300,000 to be paid if Brescia secured their Serie A status for the coming campaign. Brescia also announced in its financial report that Diamanti had cost the club €3.85 million.

Alessandro was unveiled at Brescia on 25 August 2010 and chose to continue wearing the number 32 shirt. Due to his popularity, ability and playing style, comparisons were drawn between Diamanti and former club icon Roberto Baggio, which Diamanti played down, however. In his debut season at Brescia, Diamanti scored six Serie A goals, behind only Andrea Caracciolo as the club's top scorer for the domestic season. Diamanti's sixth goal came in a 2–1 loss against Catania which confirmed Brescia's relegation to Serie B, just one season after promotion to the top-flight.

In July 2011, West Ham called for Diamanti's registration at Brescia to be suspended by the Italian Football Federation (FIGC) claiming the latest instalment of his €2.2 million transfer fee from Brescia had not yet been paid.

=== Bologna ===
On 1 August 2011, Diamanti was signed by Serie A side Bologna in a co-ownership deal with Brescia, for €1.5 million. Diamanti's first goal for the club came in a 3–1 home defeat to Internazionale on 24 September. On 11 December, Bologna played host to Inter's cross–city rivals Milan; Diamanti played inspired football and provided an assist for Marco Di Vaio's opening goal and then netted a 73rd-minute goal to earn his side a 2–2 draw.

Diamanti scored the winning goal of a 3–1 away victory over Lazio on 11 March 2012 with a 30-yard strike over out-of-position goalkeeper Federico Marchetti. On 12 April, Diamanti scored an incredible free-kick against Cagliari to move his side up to 40 points and six points clear of the relegation zone.

On 16 September 2012, Diamanti scored in between strikes from Alberto Gilardino to help Bologna to a 3–2 comeback victory over Roma at the Stadio Olimpico. Diamanti put the finishing touches on a comfortable 3–0 defeat of Palermo on 18 November, netting from the penalty spot in the 48th minute.

On 2 December, Diamanti netted from a free-kick as Bologna earned a hard-fought 2–1 victory over Atalanta, courtesy of a second-half goal from teammate Manolo Gabbiadini. Two weeks later, on 16 December, Diamanti proved instrumental in Bologna's surprise 3–2 defeat of high-flying Napoli, providing the free-kick from which Daniele Portanova headed in a minute from time to secure the victory.

During the 2012–13 Serie A season, Diamanti was the most fouled player in Serie A, having been fouled 147 times.

=== Guangzhou Evergrande ===
On 7 February 2014, Bologna and Guangzhou Evergrande officially announced an agreement over transferring Diamanti to Guangzhou Evergrande with a transfer fee of €6.9 million. He made his debut appearance for Guangzhou in a 4–2 win over Melbourne Victory on 26 February 2014 in the first group match of the 2014 Asian Champions League. He scored twice to change the course of the match after Guangzhou lagged 2–0 in the first half. He made his CSL debut at the CSL's opening match at Tianhe Stadium on 8 March 2014; he did not score a goal, and was substituted off the pitch in the 67th minute.

==== Fiorentina (loan) ====
On 10 January 2015, Diamanti moved to Fiorentina on loan from Guangzhou Evergrande. He scored his first goal for the club on 8 February in a 3–2 win over Atalanta.

==== Watford (loan) ====
On 17 August 2015, Diamanti signed for English Premier League club Watford, on loan from Guangzhou Evergrande, subject to international clearance.

==== Atalanta (loan) ====
On 13 January 2016, Diamanti signed a season-long loan with Atalanta. He scored his first goal for the club on 20 March in a 2–0 win over former club Bologna.

=== Palermo ===
On 29 August 2016, free agent Diamanti joined Palermo on a two-year deal. After the club's relegation at the end of the 2016–17 Serie A season, however, he cancelled his contract with the club on 31 August 2017.

=== Western United ===
On 24 July 2019, Diamanti joined new A-League club Western United on a one-year marquee deal. Diamanti was also named as the club's inaugural captain ahead of the 2019–20 A-League season. At the end of the season, he won the Johnny Warren Medal as the best player of the year. He missed the second half of the 2021/22 season due to a knee injury, watching from the stands as his side won the A-League championship in their first Grand Final appearance.

On 24 April 2023, Diamanti officially announced his retirement from professional football via an Instagram post, as he was set to play his last game for Western United on 29 April, in the final match of the league's regular season against Perth Glory. He left the club to become a coach at crosstown rivals Melbourne City.

== International career ==
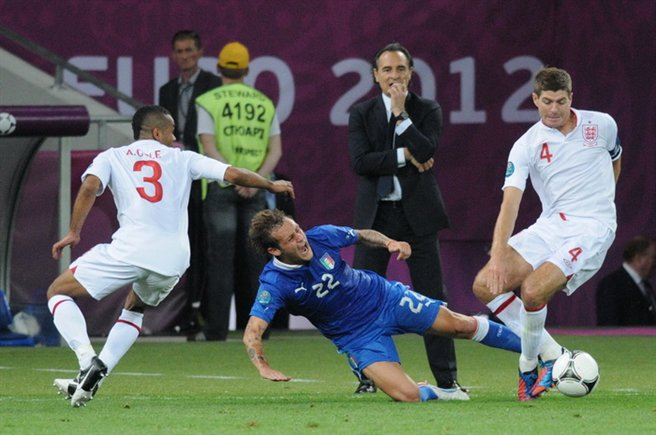
Diamanti (in blue) at the Euro 2012 quarter-final, in action with Ashley Cole (left) and Steven Gerrard (right) of England.

Diamanti made his debut with the Italy national team on 17 November 2010, for manager Cesare Prandelli, in a friendly match against Romania. He played only the first half of his debut game before being substituted. In May 2012, he was named in the provisional, 32-man Italian squad for UEFA Euro 2012 and came on as a substitute in the final group match against the Republic of Ireland on 18 June 2012, setting up Mario Balotelli's goal from a corner as Italy won the match 2–0 to advance to the quarter-finals. In the quarter-final against England on 24 June 2012, Diamanti came on in the second half for Antonio Cassano and scored the winning penalty to give Italy a 4–2 penalty shoot-out win. Italy were defeated 4–0 by Spain in the final.

Diamanti was selected for Italy's squad at the 2013 FIFA Confederations Cup in Brazil. He scored one goal at the tournament, from a free kick in the bronze medal game against Uruguay, his first international goal; he was also involved in Davide Astori's opening goal, as the latter scored off the rebound after Diamanti's free kick had hit the crossbar. Italy went on to win the match 3–2 on penalties following a 2–2 deadlock after extra time.

== Style of play ==
Nicknamed "Alino", Diamanti was a dynamic, creative and technically gifted left-footed playmaker, who usually played as an attacking midfielder; he had also been deployed as a winger or as a supporting striker on occasion, due to his ability to both create chances for teammates, and score goals with his accurate striking ability from outside the area, despite his lack of pace. He was predominantly known for his vision, passing, crossing, control, and dribbling ability, as well as his accuracy from penalties; he was also a set-piece specialist, known for his delivery from dead ball situations, as well as his precise curling direct free kicks, and has scored directly from corner kicks throughout his career. In addition to his flair and playing ability, he is also known for his charismatic personality, tenacity, and leadership on the pitch; moreover, he is a player who wins a lot of fouls for his team.

== Managerial career ==
On 12 July 2023, Diamanti was announced as coach of Melbourne City FC Youth, taking charge from the 2024 season. He later obtained his UEFA A License in September 2024, and led the team to promotion to the NPL Victoria in 2025 via the play-offs. He left the club in November 2025 to return to Italy to pursue his UEFA Pro License, and on 1 July 2026 was appointed manager of Cesena in Serie B on a two-year contract.

== Personal life ==
Diamanti's wife, Silvia Hsieh, is Taiwanese. They married on 6 July 2008. On 18 December 2008, Silvia gave birth to their daughter, Aileen. On 17 July 2010, Silvia gave birth to a second girl, Olivia. On 8 March 2013, the couple's third child, a boy named Taddeo, was born.

Following the end of his playing career, Diamanti continued to remain in Australia with his family and was granted an Australian citizenship in July 2025.

== Career statistics ==
=== Club ===
Appearances and goals by club, season and competition
Club	Season	League			National cup (Note: Includes Coppa Italia, FA Cup, Chinese FA Cup, Australia Cup)		League cup (Note: Includes Football League Cup)		Continental		Other		Total	
Club	Season	Division	Apps	Goals	Apps	Goals	Apps	Goals	Apps	Goals	Apps	Goals	Apps	Goals
Prato	1999–2000	Serie C2	1	0	0	0	—		—		—		1	0
Prato	2001–02	Serie C2	0	0	1	0	—		—		—		1	0
Prato	2002–03	Serie C1	2	0	3	0	—		—		—		5	0
Prato	2003–04	Serie C1	20	4	3	0	—		—		2	0	25	4
Prato	Total		23	4	7	0	—		—		2	0	32	4
Empoli (loan)	2000–01	Serie B	0	0	0	0	—		—		—		0	0
Fucecchio (loan)	2001–02	Serie D	24	3	0	0	—		—		—		24	3
Fiorentina (loan)	2002–03	Serie C2	3	0	0	0	—		—		—		3	0
AlbinoLeffe	2004–05	Serie B	18	0	1	0	—		—		—		19	0
AlbinoLeffe	2005–06	Serie B	8	0	0	0	—		—		—		8	0
AlbinoLeffe	Total		26	0	1	0	—		—		—		27	0
Prato (loan)	2005–06	Serie C2	11	4	0	0	—		—		2 (Note: Appearances in Serie C2 relegation play-offs)	1	13	5
Prato	2006–07	Serie C2	25	10	6	5	—		—		—		31	15
Livorno	2007–08	Serie A	26	4	1	0	—		—		—		27	4
Livorno	2008–09	Serie B	32	13	3	4	—		—		4 (Note: Appearances in Serie B promotion play-offs)	3	39	20
Livorno	2009–10	Serie A	1	0	0	0	—		—		—		1	0
Livorno	Total		59	17	4	4	—		—		4	3	67	24
West Ham United	2009–10	Premier League	27	7	1	1	1	0	—		—		29	8
West Ham United	2010–11	Premier League	1	0	0	0	0	0	—		—		1	0
West Ham United	Total		28	7	1	1	1	0	—		—		30	8
Brescia	2010–11	Serie A	32	6	1	1	—		—		—		33	7
Bologna	2011–12	Serie A	30	7	2	1	—		—		—		32	8
Bologna	2012–13	Serie A	34	7	2	1	—		—		—		36	8
Bologna	2013–14	Serie A	19	5	1	1	—		—		—		20	6
Bologna	Total		83	19	5	3	—		—		—		88	22
Guangzhou	2014	Chinese Super League	24	4	2	0	—		9 (Note: Appearances in AFC Champions League)	4	—		35	8
Fiorentina (loan)	2014–15	Serie A	11	2	4	0	—		—		—		15	2
Watford (loan)	2015–16	Premier League	3	0	0	0	0	0	—		—		3	0
Atalanta (loan)	2015–16	Serie A	16	1	0	0	—		—		—		16	1
Palermo	2016–17	Serie A	31	1	1	0	—		—		—		32	1
Perugia	2017–18	Serie B	13	2	0	0	—		—		1	0	14	2
Livorno	2018–19	Serie B	32	10	1	0	—		—		—		33	10
Western United	2019–20	A-League	27	8	0	0	—		—		—		27	8
Western United	2020–21	A-League	24	1	0	0	—		—		—		24	1
Western United	2021–22	A-League	10	0	1	0	—		—		—		11	0
Western United	2022–23	A-League	21	2	0	0	—		—		—		21	2
Western United	Total		82	11	1	0	—		—		—		83	11
Career total			526	101	34	14	1	0	9	4	9	4	579	123

=== International ===
Appearances and goals by national team and year
National team	Year	Apps	Goals
Italy	2010	1	0
Italy	2012	7	0
Italy	2013	9	1
Total		17	1

Scores and results list Italy's goal tally first, score column indicates score after each Diamanti goal.

List of international goals scored by Alessandro Diamanti
No.	Date	Venue	Opponent	Score	Result	Competition
1	30 June 2013	Arena Fonte Nova, Salvador, Brazil	Uruguay	2–1	2–2 (3–2 p)	2013 FIFA Confederations Cup

== Honours ==
Fiorentina

- Serie C2: 2002–03

Livorno

- Serie B Play-offs: 2008–09

Guangzhou Evergrande

- Chinese Super League: 2014

Western United

- A-League Men Championship: 2022

Italy

- UEFA European Championship runner-up: 2012
- FIFA Confederations Cup third place: 2013

Individual

- PFA A-League Team of the Season: 2019–20
- Johnny Warren Medal: 2020
