= Ryan Scott (soccer, born 1995) =

Australian soccer player

Personal information
- Full name: Ryan Scott
- Date of birth: 18 December 1995 (age 30)
- Place of birth: Gembrook, Australia
- Height: 1.84 m (6 ft 0 in)
- Position: Goalkeeper

Team information
- Current team: Preston Lions

Senior career*
Years	Team	Apps	(Gls)
2015–2019	Bentleigh Greens	114	(0)
2019–2023	Western United	21	(0)
2023–2025	Newcastle Jets	46	(0)
2025–	Preston Lions	23	(0)
- * Club domestic league appearances and goals as of 24 May 2026

Ryan Scott (born 18 December 1995) is an Australian soccer player who plays as a goalkeeper for Preston Lions FC.

== Career ==
=== Western United ===
On 8 November 2019, Scott joined Western United on a three-month injury replacement contract, having previously worked as a brick-layer whilst playing for Bentleigh Greens. In June 2020, he signed a two-year contract extension. He made his debut for the club on March 7, 2020, when he was subbed on after first-choice keeper Filip Kurto failed a concussion test.

At the conclusion of the 2022-23 season, after 4 seasons at the club, Scott was released by Western United.

=== Newcastle Jets ===
On 8 June 2023, Ryan Scott signed with the Newcastle Jets.

=== Preston Lions ===
On 25 June 2025, Ryan Scott signed with the NPL Victoria club Preston Lions FC.

== Honours ==
=== Club ===
Western United

- A-League Championship: 2021–22

Preston Lions FC

- Dockerty Cup: 2026
