= Jerry Skotadis =

Australian soccer player

Personal information
- Full name: Jerry John Skotadis
- Date of birth: 7 March 2000 (age 26)
- Place of birth: Australia
- Height: 1.78 m (5 ft 10 in)
- Position: Defensive midfielder

Team information
- Current team: Rockdale Ilinden
- Number: 8

Youth career
- FNSW NTC
- Western Sydney Wanderers

Senior career*
Years	Team	Apps	(Gls)
2017	Western Sydney Wanderers NPL	7	(0)
2017–2019	Sydney FC NPL	39	(6)
2019	Sydney FC	0	(0)
2019	Sutherland Sharks	6	(2)
2019–2022	Western United	43	(0)
2021	Western United NPL	11	(2)
2022–2024	Macarthur FC	29	(0)
2025	Sutherland Sharks	18	(0)
2026–	Rockdale Ilinden	26	(3)
- * Club domestic league appearances and goals as of 8 August 2026 ‡ National team caps and goals as of 22 May 2019

Jerry Skotadis (born 7 March 2000) is an Australian professional soccer player who last played as a defensive midfielder for Rockdale Ilinden in the NPL NSW.

== Club career ==
=== Sydney FC ===
On 21 May 2019, Skotadis made his professional debut in the 2019 AFC Champions League in a group stage match against Kawasaki Frontale, replacing Cameron Devlin in the 84th minute as they went on to lose 4–0, being eliminated from the competition.

=== Western United ===
On 19 October 2019, Skotadis signed a scholarship contract with Western United for the 2019–20 season. He made his debut in United's Round 9 clash against Melbourne Victory, playing the full 90 minutes in the 3–1 win. On 24 January 2020, after 6 A-League appearances, he penned a two-year contract extension with Western United. Two days later, he provided the assist for Alessandro Diamanti's equaliser in a 4–3 loss to Adelaide United at Coopers Stadium.

== Honours ==
Macarthur

- Australia Cup: 2022
