= Dylan Pierias =

Australian soccer player

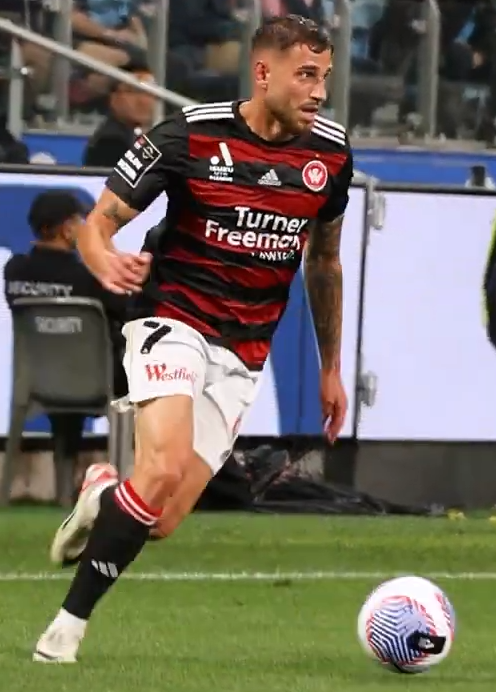
- Pierias playing for Western Sydney Wanderers in 2023

Personal information
- Full name: Dylan Pierias
- Date of birth: 20 February 2000 (age 26)
- Place of birth: Melbourne, Australia
- Height: 1.75 m (5 ft 9 in)
- Positions: Right-back; winger

Team information
- Current team: Adelaide United
- Number: 20

Youth career
- 2007–2011: Keilor Park
- 2012: Spring Hills
- 2013–2014: FFV NTC
- 2015: Pascoe Vale

Senior career*
Years	Team	Apps	(Gls)
2016–2019	Melbourne City NPL	37	(7)
2017–2019	Melbourne City	3	(0)
2019–2023	Western United	94	(10)
2023	Western Sydney Wanderers NPL	1	(0)
2023–2024	Western Sydney Wanderers	26	(3)
2024–	Adelaide United	33	(5)

International career^{‡}
2016–2017	Australia U-17	14	(3)
2018	Australia U-20	1	(0)
2021	Australia U-23	1	(0)
Medal record
Men's football
Representing Australia
AFF U-16 Youth Championship
First place	2016 Cambodia	U-17 Team
Third place	2015 Cambodia	U-17 Team
- * Club domestic league appearances and goals as of 1 February 2025 ‡ National team caps and goals as of 12 July 2021

Dylan Pierias (Macedonian: Дилан Пиеријас, romanized: Dilan Pierijas, pronounced [ˈpi.e.ri.jas]; born 20 February 2000) is an Australian professional soccer player who currently plays as a winger for Adelaide United in the A-League. He previously played football in the A-Leagues for Melbourne City, Western United, and Western Sydney Wanderers.

== Club career ==
Pierias began playing as a seven-year-old at Keilor Park SC, moving to Spring Hills as a teenager.

=== Melbourne City ===
With eight first team players unavailable through suspension or injury, Pierias debuted for Melbourne City against Brisbane Roar on 11 February 2017 at 16 years of age, making him the first person born in the 21st Century to play in the A-League.

=== Western United ===
Pierias joined Western United for the 2019–20 season, the club's debut season in the league following their establishment in 2018. In May 2021, he signed a two-year contract extension with Western United. Pierias was substituted on in the 89th minute in the winning 2022 A-League Men Grand Final against his former club Melbourne City. Replacing Dylan Wenzel-Halls, Pierias was one of the eleven men for Western United on AAMI Park at the final whistle of the match. He departed Western United at the end of the 2022-23 season after 4 seasons at the club, making 94 league appearances.

=== Western Sydney Wanderers ===
Pierias joined Western Sydney Wanderers ahead of the 2023–24 season. Pierias played 26 games for the Wanderers and scored 3 goals in the 2023-24 season, but following a season in which the club failed to qualify for the finals series, Pierias departed the club.

=== Adelaide United ===
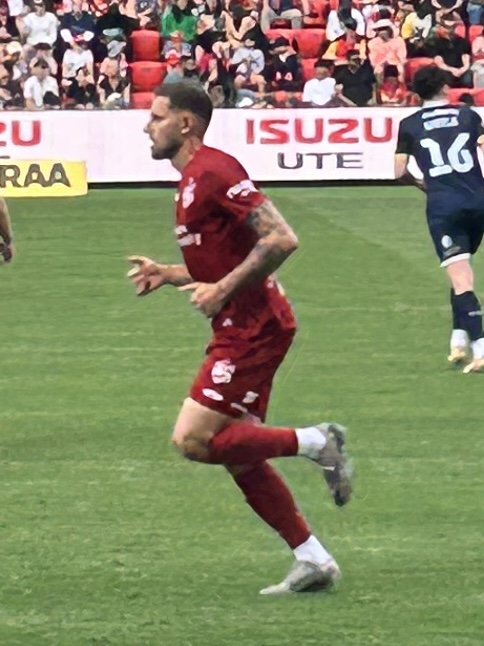
Pierias playing for Adelaide United in 2024.

In June 2024, Pierias joined his fourth A-League club in Adelaide United as a replacement for the recent departures of Craig Goodwin, Nestory Irankunda, and Ben Halloran. Pierias scored in his first match against his last club, Western Sydney, in an impressive 4–1 away win. Primarily playing a defensive role on the wing, he scored twice more by the start of February, already equalling his goal tally of the previous season.

On 20 December 2025, Pierias was forced off through injury during a 1–0 win over Perth Glory. The club later confirmed that he had suffered a “significant knee injury”, which would rule him out until late 2026.

== International career ==
Born in Australia, Pierias is of Macedonian descent. He helped the Australia U-23 qualify for the Tokyo 2020 Olympics. He was part of the Olyroos Olympic squad. The team beat Argentina in their first group match but were unable to win another match. They were therefore not in medal contention.
