= List of Western United FC players =

Western United Football Club, an association football club based in Truganina, Victoria, was founded in 2018 as Western Melbourne.

Tomoki Imai holds the record for the greatest number of appearances for Western United. Between 2020 and the 2024, the Japanese defender played 110 times for the club. The club's goalscoring record is held by Besart Berisha, who scored 26 goals in all competitions between 2019 and 2021.

== Key ==
- The list is ordered first by date of debut, and then if necessary in alphabetical order.
- Appearances as a substitute are included.
- Statistics are correct up to and including the match played on 24 July 2024. Where a player left the club permanently after this date, his statistics are updated to his date of leaving.

Positions key
GK	Goalkeeper
DF	Defender
MF	Midfielder
FW	Forward

Nationality
Unless otherwise noted, the nationality of a player is determined by the country/countries which he has played for, or if said person has not played international football, their country of birth.
Position
Playing positions are listed according to the tactical formations that were employed at the time.
Club career
Club career is defined as the first and last calendar years in which the player appeared for the club in any of the competitions listed below.
Total appearances and Total goals
Total appearances and goals comprise those in the A-League Men regular season and finals series and Australia Cup.

== Players ==
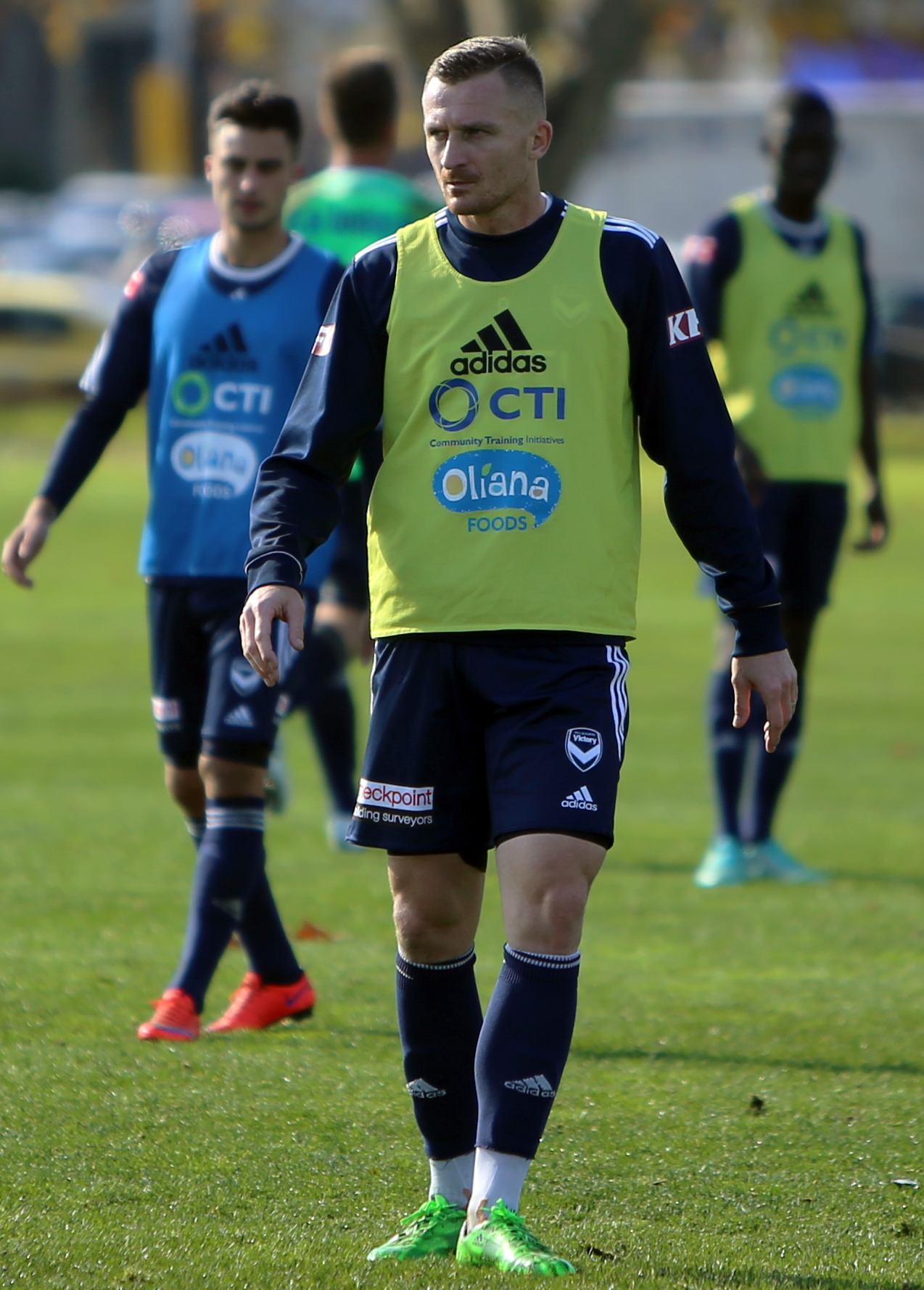
Besart Berisha is Western United's highest all-time goalscorer.

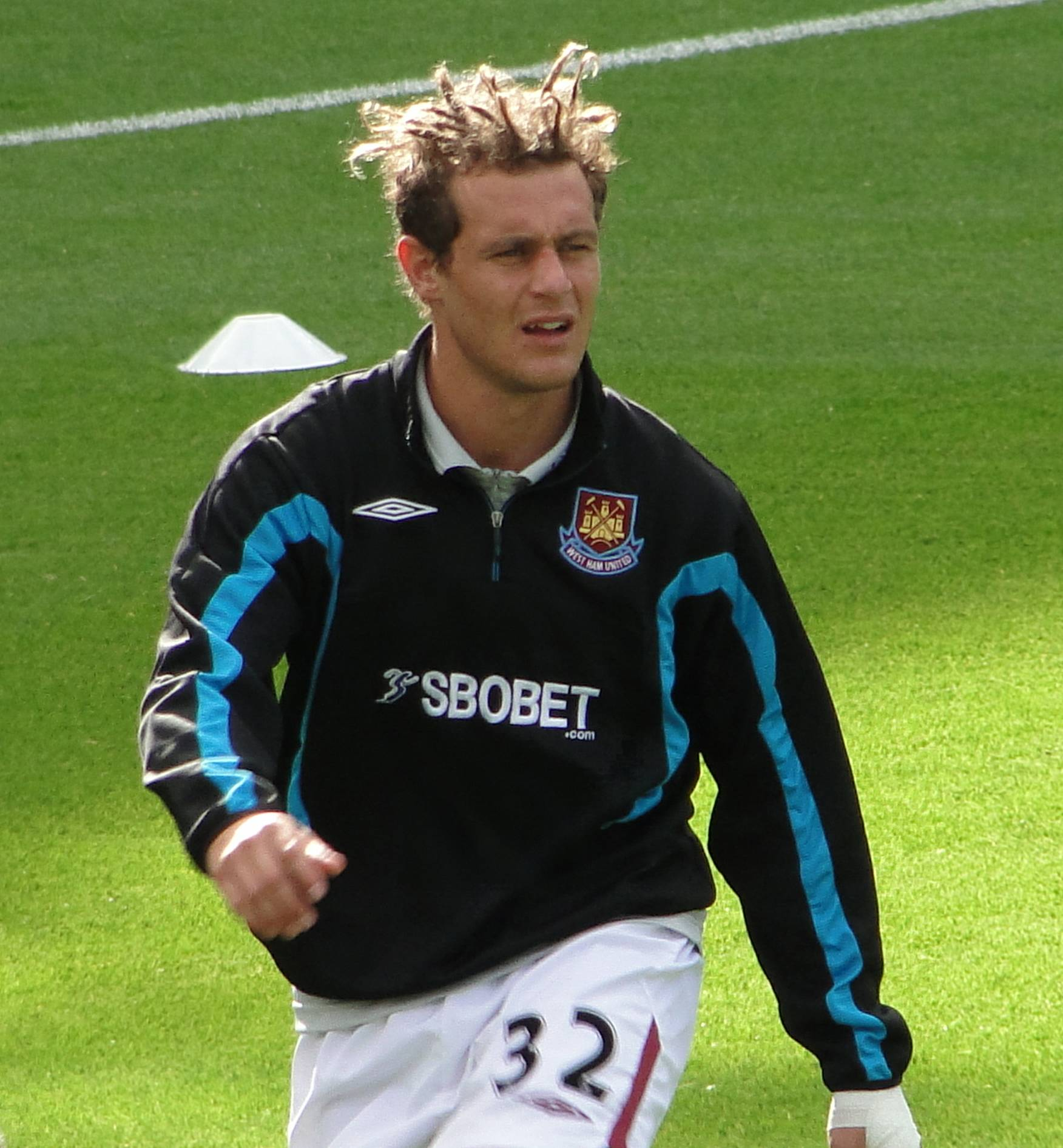
Alessandro Diamanti joined Western United in their inaugural season.

Players highlighted in bold are still actively playing at Western United.

List of Western United FC players
Player	Nationality	Pos	Club career	Starts	Subs	Total	Goals	Ref.
Player	Nationality	Pos	Club career	Appearances			Goals	Ref.
Kwabena Appiah	New Zealand	FW	2019–2020	3	3	6	1	
Jonathan Aspropotamitis	Australia	DF	2019–2020	3	6	9	0	
Besart Berisha	Kosovo	FW	2019–2021	45	5	50	26	
Max Burgess	Australia	MF	2019–2021	14	11	25	6	
Connor Chapman	Australia	MF	2019	8	0	8	0	
Alessandro Diamanti	Italy	FW	2019–2023	58	25	83	11	
Andrew Durante	New Zealand	DF	2019–2021	43	2	45	2	
Ersan Gülüm	Turkey	DF	2019	9	0	9	0	
Dario Jertec	Croatia	MF	2019–2020	13	2	15	0	
Panagiotis Kone	Greece	MF	2019–2020	15	0	15	2	
Filip Kurto	Poland	GK	2019–2021	36	0	36	0	
Scott McDonald	Australia	FW	2019–2020	8	1	9	1	
Connor Pain	Australia	FW	2019–2023	102	6	108	10	
Josh Risdon	Australia	DF	2019–2024	93	3	96	4	
Dylan Pierias	Australia	DF	2019–2023	42	56	98	10	
Aaron Calver	Australia	DF	2019–2021	27	7	34	1	
Brendan Hamill	Australia	DF	2019–2021	12	8	20	0	
Apostolos Stamatelopoulos	Australia	FW	2019–2020	2	10	12	0	
Jerry Skotadis	Australia	MF	2019–2022	20	25	45	0	
Valentino Yuel	South Sudan	FW	2019–2020	2	7	9	0	
Joshua Cavallo	Australia	MF	2019–2021	2	7	9	0	
Thiel Iradukunda	Australia	MF	2019–2020	1	3	4	0	
**Sebastian Pasquali**	Australia	MF	2019–	29	17	46	0	
Oskar Dillon	Australia	DF	2020	7	0	7	0	
Tomislav Uskok	Australia	DF	2020–2021	33	0	33	2	
**Tomoki Imai**	Japan	DF	2020–	112	2	114	1	
Steven Lustica	Australia	MF	2020–2024	76	13	89	7	
Luke Duzel	Australia	MF	2020–2021	10	7	17	0	
Ryan Scott	Australia	GK	2020–2023	19	3	22	0	
Patrick Antelmi	Australia	FW	2020	0	1	1	0	
Ayom Majok	Australia	FW	2020	0	1	1	0	
Nicolas Milanovic	Australia	FW	2020–2023	6	33	39	5	
Víctor Sánchez	Spain	MF	2020–2021	15	3	18	3	
Ivan Vujica	Australia	DF	2020–2021	5	7	12	1	
Lachlan Wales	Australia	FW	2020–2024	100	13	113	18	
Iker Guarrotxena	Spain	FW	2021	17	5	22	3	
Kaine Sheppard	England	FW	2021	0	7	7	0	
Brad Inman	Australia	MF	2021	0	5	5	0	
Dalibor Markovic	Australia	DF	2021	2	2	4	0	
Adisu Bayew	Australia	FW	2021–2023	6	21	27	2	
Manyluak Aguek	South Sudan	FW	2021	0	2	2	0	
**Ben Garuccio**	Australia	DF	2021–	76	0	76	6	
Léo Lacroix	Switzerland	DF	2021–2023	50	2	52	3	
Neil Kilkenny	Australia	MF	2021–2023	46	2	48	1	
Aleksandar Prijović	Serbia	FW	2021–2023	38	6	44	19	
Dylan Wenzel-Halls	Australia	FW	2021–2023	21	16	37	5	
Jamie Young	England	GK	2021–2023	59	0	59	0	
Nikolai Topor-Stanley	Australia	DF	2021–2023	32	5	37	1	
Ben Collins	Australia	DF	2021–2023	2	3	5	0	
Daniel Di Francesco	Australia	DF	2021	1	0	1	0	
Sabit James	Australia	FW	2021	0	1	1	0	
Christian Theoharous	Australia	FW	2021–2022	2	3	5	0	
Rene Krhin	Slovenia	MF	2022	12	5	17	1	
**Noah Botic**	Australia	FW	2022–	27	20	47	12	
**Rhys Bozinovski**	Australia	MF	2022–	5	23	28	0	
Jalil Regague	Australia	DF	2022	0	1	1	0	
Tongo Doumbia	Mali	MF	2022–2023	18	2	20	2	
James Troisi	Australia	MF	2022–2023	14	4	18	0	
Jacob Tratt	Australia	DF	2022–2024	19	7	26	1	
Connor O'Toole	Australia	DF	2023–2024	2	7	9	1	
**Michael Ruhs**	Australia	FW	2023–	20	14	34	5	
**Ramy Najjarine**	Australia	FW	2023–	2	13	15	0	
Max Bisetto	Australia	MF	2023	0	2	2	0	
**Riku Danzaki**	Japan	MF	2023–	18	6	24	3	
**James Donachie**	Australia	DF	2023–	14	0	14	1	
**Tom Heward-Belle**	Australia	GK	2023–	26	0	26	0	
**Jake Najdovski**	Australia	FW	2023–	0	7	7	0	
**Angus Thurgate**	Australia	MF	2023–	31	0	31	1	
**Oliver Lavale**	Australia	FW	2023–	3	4	7	1	
Daniel Penha	Brazil	MF	2023–2024	20	3	23	7	
**Kane Vidmar**	Australia	DF	2023–	12	1	13	0	
Nikita Rukavytsya	Australia	FW	2023–2024	2	13	15	2	
**Matthew Grimaldi**	Australia	MF	2023–	11	15	26	6	
Zach Lisolajski	Australia	DF	2024	1	5	6	0	
**James York**	Australia	MF	2024–	1	2	3	0	
**Jordan Lauton**	Australia	MF	2024–	0	2	2	0	
**Charbel Shamoon**	Iraq	DF	2024–	3	2	5	0	
**Luke Vickery**	Australia	FW	2024–	0	4	4	0	
**Khoder Kaddour**	Lebanon	DF	2024–	4	1	5	0	
**Matt Sutton**	Australia	GK	2024–	5	0	5	0	
**Abel Walatee**	Australia	FW	2024–	0	4	4	1	
**Tate Russell**	Australia	DF	2024–	1	0	1	0	
**Hiroshi Ibusuki**	Japan	FW	2024–	0	1	1	0	
**Mark Leonard**	Australia	FW	2024–	0	1	1	0	
**Luka Coveny**	New Zealand	DF	2024–	0	1	1	0	

== Captains ==
Dates	Captain
2019–2023	Alessandro Diamanti (ITA)
2023–2024	Josh Risdon (AUS)
