= 2021–22 Western United FC season =

Western United
2021–22 season
- Chairman: Jason Sourasis
- Manager: John Aloisi
- Stadium: GMHBA Stadium; AAMI Park; Mars Stadium; Morshead Park Stadium; UTAS Stadium
- A-League Men: 3rd
- A-League Men Finals: Winners
- FFA Cup: Round of 32
- Top goalscorer: League: Aleksandar Prijović (14); All: Aleksandar Prijović (15)
- Highest home attendance: 8,127 vs. Melbourne City (12 March 2022); A-League Men
- Lowest home attendance: 1,127 vs. Newcastle Jets (13 November 2021); FFA Cup
- Average home league attendance: 3,616
- Biggest win: 6–0 vs. Perth Glory (H) (16 April 2022); A-League Men
- Biggest defeat: 0–3 vs. Sydney FC (A) (19 March 2022); A-League Men
Home colours	Away colours

The 2021–22 season was the third in the history of Western United Football Club. In addition to the domestic league, Western United also competed in the FFA Cup for the first time.

They finished third in the regular season and then won the Championship, beating holders Melbourne City in the Grand Final.

The season was documented in the docuseries United.

== Review ==
=== Background ===
Western United's 2020–21 campaign had seen an eight-game losing streak and a lack of creativity lead to a disappointing tenth-place finish in the league, the club's lowest in their history forcing them to play in the 2021 FFA Cup seventh preliminary round against Newcastle Jets. Three days after their league finish on 8 June 2021, the club parted ways with their head coach Marko Rudan who was their manager since their first season in 2019–20.

== Players ==
=== First-team squad ===
Note: Flags indicate national team as defined under FIFA eligibility rules; some limited exceptions apply. Players may hold more than one non-FIFA nationality.

No.	Pos.	Nation	Player
1	GK	ENG	Jamie Young
4	DF	SUI	Léo Lacroix
5	DF	AUS	Dylan Pierias
6	DF	JPN	Tomoki Imai
8	FW	AUS	Lachlan Wales
9	FW	AUS	Dylan Wenzel-Halls
10	MF	AUS	Steven Lustica
11	FW	AUS	Connor Pain
12	DF	AUS	Dalibor Markovic
13	DF	AUS	Ivan Vujica
16	MF	SLO	Rene Krhin
17	DF	AUS	Ben Garuccio
19	DF	AUS	Josh Risdon (vice-captain)
21	MF	AUS	Sebastian Pasquali

No.	Pos.	Nation	Player
23	MF	ITA	Alessandro Diamanti (captain)
25	MF	AUS	Luke Duzel
26	MF	AUS	Nicolas Milanovic (scholarship)
27	MF	AUS	Jerry Skotadis
31	MF	AUS	Adisu Bayew (scholarship)
33	DF	AUS	Ben Collins (scholarship)
34	MF	AUS	Christian Theoharous (scholarship)
36	DF	AUS	Ajak Deu (scholarship)
37	GK	AUS	Ryan Scott
38	FW	AUS	Noah Botic
42	MF	AUS	Rhys Bozinovski (scholarship)
44	DF	AUS	Nikolai Topor-Stanley
88	MF	AUS	Neil Kilkenny
99	FW	SRB	Aleksandar Prijović

== Transfers ==
=== Transfers in ===
No.	Position	Player	Transferred from	Type/fee	Contract length	Date	Ref
9	FW	Dylan Wenzel-Halls	Brisbane Roar	Free transfer	3 years	21 June 2021	
17	DF	Ben Garuccio	Melbourne City	Free transfer	2 years	18 July 2021	
44	DF	Nikolai Topor-Stanley	Unattached	Free transfer	1 year	29 July 2021	
1	GK	(England) Jamie Young	Brisbane Roar	Free transfer	2 years	2 August 2021	
38	FW	Noah Botic	(Germany) Hoffenheim	Free transfer	2 years	2 August 2021	
88	MF	Neil Kilkenny	Unattached	Free transfer		27 August 2021	
4	DF	(Switzerland) Léo Lacroix	(Switzerland) Sion	Undisclosed	1 year	1 September 2021	
16	MF	(Slovenia) Rene Krhin	Unattached	Free transfer	1 year	26 September 2021	
99	FW	(Serbia) Aleksandar Prijović	Unattached	Free transfer	Multi-year	15 October 2021	
34	MF	Christian Theoharous	Unattached	Scholarship	2 years	1 November 2021	

==== From youth squad ====
N	Pos.	Nat.	Name	Age	Notes
31	MF	(Australia)	Adisu Bayew	19	2 year scholarship contract
36	DF	(Australia)	Ajak Deu	20	2 year scholarship contract
42	MF	(Australia)	Rhys Bozinovski	17	2 year scholarship contract
33	DF	(Australia)	Ben Collins	21	1 year scholarship contract

=== Transfers out ===
No.	Position	Player	Transferred to	Type/fee	Date	Ref
14	MF	Max Burgess	Sydney FC	Free transfer	23 May 2021	
4	DF	(New Zealand) Andrew Durante	Retired		5 June 2021	
1	GK	(Poland) Filip Kurto	Unattached	End of contract	18 June 2021	
2	DF	Aaron Calver	Unattached	End of contract	18 June 2021	
9	FW	(England) Kaine Sheppard	Unattached	End of contract	18 June 2021	
17	MF	Brad Inman	(India) ATK Mohun Bagan	End of loan	18 June 2021	
22	DF	Tomislav Uskok	Unattached	End of contract	18 June 2021	
34	FW	(Spain) Iker Guarrotxena	Unattached	End of contract	18 June 2021	
7	FW	(Kosovo) Besart Berisha	Unattached	End of contract	18 July 2021	
3	DF	Brendan Hamill	Melbourne Victory	End of contract	26 July 2021	
20	MF	(Spain) Víctor Sánchez	Unattached	Mutual contract termination	7 September 2021	
24	FW	Ayom Majok	Unattached	Mutual contract termination	9 February 2022	

=== Contract extensions ===
No.	Name	Position	Duration	Date	Notes
25	Luke Duzel	Midfielder	2 years	23 June 2021	
6	(Japan) Tomoki Imai	Defender	3 years	2 July 2021	
19	Josh Risdon	Right-back	1 year	10 November 2021	
10	Steven Lustica	Central midfielder	1 year		
19	Josh Risdon	Right-back	2 years	6 December 2021	
10	Steven Lustica	Central midfielder	1 year	18 February 2022	
8	Lachlan Wales	Winger	2 years	22 February 2022	

== Pre-season and friendlies ==
Win Draw Loss

10 September 2021	Western United	1–2	Melbourne City	Melbourne, Australia
11:00 AEST	Wenzel-Halls 90'	Report	Leckie 53'; Maclaren 62'	Stadium: City Vista Pavilion and Sports Field

1 November 2021	Melbourne City	1–1	Western United	Melbourne, Australia
	Leckie 21'	Report	Topor-Stanley 51'	Stadium: Casey Fields; Attendance: 0 (behind closed doors)

5 November 2021	Western United	1–3	Melbourne City	Geelong, Australia
	Pierias 125'	Report	Colakovski 75' (pen.); ? 93' (o.g.); Maclaren 105' (pen.)	Stadium: GMHBA Stadium; Attendance: 0 (behind closed doors)
Note: The match was played over 135 minutes

== Competitions ==
=== Overview ===
Competition	First match	Last match	Starting round	Final position	Record							
Competition	First match	Last match	Starting round	Final position	Pld	W	D	L	GF	GA	GD	Win %
A-League	20 November 2021	8 May 2022	Matchday 1	3rd	26	13	6	7	40	30	+10	50.00
A-League Men Finals	14 May 2022	28 May 2022	Elimination-finals	Winners	4	3	0	1	7	2	+5	75.00
FFA Cup	13 November 2021	7 December 2021	Playoff round	Round of 32	2	1	0	1	2	2	+0	50.00
Total					32	17	6	9	49	34	+15	53.13

Last updated: 29 January 2022
Source: Competitions

=== A-League Men ===
==== League table ====
Pos	Team	Pld	W	D	L	GF	GA	GD	Pts	Qualification
1	Melbourne City	26	14	7	5	55	33	+22	49	Qualification for finals series and 2023–24 AFC Champions League group stage (Note: Determined by which of the Premiers for the 2021–22 or 2022–23 seasons accrued the most combined points over both seasons. Melbourne City qualified as they were Premiers in both seasons.)
2	Melbourne Victory	26	13	9	4	42	25	+17	48	Qualification for finals series (Note: The top two teams enter the finals series at the semi-finals, while the teams ranked third to sixth enter the finals series at the elimination-finals.)
3	Western United (C)	26	13	6	7	40	30	+10	45	Qualification for finals series
4	Adelaide United	26	12	7	7	38	31	+7	43	Qualification for finals series
5	Central Coast Mariners	26	12	6	8	49	35	+14	42	Qualification for finals series

Source: A-Leagues
Rules for classification: 1) Points; 2) Goal difference; 3) Goals scored; 4) Points per game; 5) Least red cards; 6) Least yellow cards; 7) Toss of a coin in an event of a tie of two clubs.
(C) Champions

==== Results by round ====
Round	1	2	3	4	5	6	11	12	10	7	14	15	9	16	17	19	18	13	20	21	23	24	22	26	8	25
Ground	H	H	A	H	H	A	A	H	A	A	A	H	H	A	H	H	A	A	A	H	H	H	H	A	A	A
Result	L	W	W	W	W	L	L	W	D	W	D	W	W	W	W	D	L	D	W	D	L	W	W	L	D	L
Position	12	6	3	3	2	4	3	2	2	1	2	2	2	2	2	2	2	2	2	2	2	2	2	3	3	3
Points	0	3	6	9	12	12	12	15	16	19	20	23	26	29	32	33	33	34	37	38	38	41	44	44	45	45

Source: Ultimate A-League
A = Away; H = Home; B = Bye; W = Win; D = Draw; L = Loss

==== Matches ====
The league fixtures were announced on 23 September 2021.

20 November 2021 1	Western United	0–1	Melbourne Victory	Geelong
19:45 AEDT		Report	Miranda 75'	Stadium: GMHBA Stadium; Attendance: 8,120; Referee: Lachlan Keevers

26 November 2021 2	Western United	1–0	Perth Glory	Melbourne
19:45 AEDT	Wenzel-Halls 78'	Report		Stadium: AAMI Park; Attendance: 3,013; Referee: Jonathon Barreiro

4 December 2021 3	Melbourne City	0–1	Western United	Melbourne
19:45 AEDT			Wenzel-Halls 20'	Stadium: AAMI Park; Attendance: 7,019; Referee: Alex King

11 December 2021 4	Western United	1–0	Brisbane Roar	Geelong
17:05 AEDT	Pain 50'			Stadium: GMHBA Stadium; Attendance: 2,845; Referee: Jonathon Barreiro

17 December 2021 5	Western United	1–0	Adelaide United	Melbourne
19:45 AEDT	Pain 44'			Stadium: AAMI Park; Attendance: 2,353; Referee: Kurt Ams

26 December 2021 6	Melbourne Victory	3–1	Western United	Melbourne
19:45 AEDT	Geria 18'; Brillante 19'; D'Agostino 90+4'		Prijović 87'	Stadium: AAMI Park; Attendance: 13,186; Referee: Shaun Evans

21 January 2022 11	Wellington Phoenix	2–1	Western United	Wollongong
19:45 AEDT	Sandoval 16'; Hooper 35'	Report	Lustica 90+4'	Stadium: WIN Stadium; Attendance: 586; Referee: Shaun Evans

29 January 2022 12	Western United	1–0	Melbourne City	Melbourne
19:45 AEDT	Lustica 71'	Report		Stadium: AAMI Park; Attendance: 4,740; Referee: Ben Abraham

2 February 2022 10	Macarthur FC	2–2	Western United	Sydney
19:45 AEDT	La. Rose 77'; Lacroix 88' (o.g.)	Report	Milanovic 16'; Prijović 74'	Stadium: Campbelltown Stadium; Attendance: 2,002; Referee: Tim Danaskos

5 February 2022 7	Western Sydney Wanderers	0–1	Western United	Sydney
17:05 AEDT		Report	Prijovic 29'	Stadium: CommBank Stadium; Attendance: 5,987; Referee: Jack Morgan

12 February 2022 14	Sydney FC	1–1	Western United	Sydney
19:45 AEST	Burgess 64'		Lustica 56'	Stadium: Netstrata Jubilee Stadium; Attendance: 4,228; Referee: Shaun Evans

20 February 2022 15	Western United	3–2	Western Sydney Wanderers	Melbourne
18:35 AEDT	Prijović 27'; Garuccio 45', 68'	Report	Hemed 51' (pen.); Ugarkovic 86'	Stadium: AAMI Park; Attendance: 3,200; Referee: Ben Abraham

23 February 2022 9	Western United	3–0 (Note: Awarded score. Original score 1–0 to Western United; result was changed after Australian Professional Leagues determined there were insufficient players on the match list for Sydney FC below a certain age.)	Sydney FC	Melbourne
17:45 AEDT	Lustica 67'	Report		Stadium: AAMI Park; Attendance: 1,850; Referee: Alex King

27 February 2022 16	Perth Glory	0–2	Western United	Launceston
19:05 AWST		Report	Prijović 37'; Pierias 56'	Stadium: UTAS Stadium; Attendance: 1,552; Referee: Jonathon Barreiro

5 March 2022 17	Western United	2–1	Newcastle Jets	Ballarat
15:05 AEDT	Lacroix 16', 52'	Report	Thurgate 81'	Stadium: Mars Stadium; Attendance: 2,674; Referee: Lachlan Keevers

12 March 2022 19	Western United	2–2	Melbourne City	Melbourne
19:45 AEDT	Lacroix 16'; Krhin 30'	Report	Metcalfe 42'; Maclaren 66'	Stadium: AAMI Park; Attendance: 8,127; Referee: Alireza Faghani

19 March 2022 18	Sydney FC	3–0	Western United	Sydney
19:45 AEDT	Ninković 23'; Narsingh 58'; Amini 68'	Report		Stadium: Netstrata Jubilee Stadium; Attendance: 3,269; Referee: Daniel Elder

23 March 2022 13	Melbourne Victory	1–1	Western United	Melbourne
19:05 AEDT	Hamill 85'	Report	Topor-Stanley 47'	Stadium: AAMI Park; Attendance: 5,022; Referee: Alireza Faghani

26 March 2022 20	Brisbane Roar	2–3	Western United	Brisbane
16:05 AEST	Lescano 3'; O'Shea 88' (pen.)	Report	Bayew 35'; Neville 59' (o.g.); Prijović 83'	Stadium: Moreton Daily Stadium; Attendance: 4,935; Referee: Adam Kersey

2 April 2022 21	Western United	2–2	Central Coast Mariners	Ballarat
16:05 AEDT	Smith 46' (o.g.); Prijović 63'	Report	Cummings 36', 64'	Stadium: Mars Stadium; Attendance: 1,423; Referee: Lachlan Keevers

9 April 2022 23	Western United	1–4	Wellington Phoenix	Ballarat
14:05 AEST	Lustica 54'	Report	Wootton 29'; Sotirio 32', 63'; Sandoval 47' (pen.)	Stadium: Morshead Park; Attendance: 1,423; Referee: Daniel Elder

16 April 2022 24	Western United	6–0	Perth Glory	Launceston
17:05 AEST	Wales 25', 27', 45+3'; Pierias 34'; Prijović 52' (pen.); Wenzel-Halls 83'	Report		Stadium: UTAS Stadium; Attendance: 2,231; Referee: Ben Abraham

19 April 2022 22	Western United	2–0	Macarthur FC	Launceston
17:05 AEST	Pain 57'; Prijović 90+4'	Report		Stadium: UTAS Stadium; Attendance: 1,569; Referee: Alex King

30 April 2022 26	Central Coast Mariners	1–0	Western United	Gosford
16:05 AEST	Kuol 81'	Report		Stadium: Central Coast Stadium; Attendance: 5,273; Referee: Alex King

4 May 2022 8	Newcastle Jets	1–1	Western United	Newcastle
19:05 AEST	Elsey 52'	Report	Bayew 27'	Stadium: McDonald Jones Stadium; Attendance: 3,567; Referee: Jonathan Bareiro

8 May 2022 25	Adelaide United	2–1	Western United	Adelaide
18:20 ACST	López 14'; Kitto 51'	Report	Wenzel-Halls 5'	Stadium: Coopers Stadium; Attendance: 6,398; Referee: Shaun Evans

==== Finals series ====
14 May 2022 Elimination final	Western United	1–0	Wellington Phoenix	Melbourne
19:45 AEST	Prijović 10'	Report		Stadium: AAMI Park; Attendance: 3,376; Referee: Alex King

17 May 2022 Semi-final 1st leg	Western United	0–1	Melbourne Victory	Melbourne
19:05 AEST		Report	Brimmer 74'	Stadium: AAMI Park; Attendance: 7,295; Referee: Alireza Faghani

21 May 2022 Semi-final 2nd leg	Melbourne Victory	1–4 (2–4 agg.)	Western United	Melbourne
17:15 AEST	Brimmer 37'	Report	Prijović 18', 49'; Wales 78'; Wenzel-Halls 90+9'	Stadium: AAMI Park; Attendance: 15,349; Referee: Alex King

28 May 2022 Grand Final	Melbourne City	0–2	Western United	Melbourne
19:45 AEST		Report	Reis 2' (o.g.); Prijović 31'	Stadium: AAMI Park; Attendance: 22,495; Referee: Chris Beath

=== FFA Cup ===
13 November 2021 Play-off	Western United	2–1	Newcastle Jets	Geelong
19:00 AEDT	Wales 44'; Prijović 79'	Report	Penha 63'	Stadium: GMHBA Stadium; Attendance: 1,127; Referee: Jonathan Barreiro

7 December 2021 Round of 32	Western United	0–1	Wellington Phoenix	Geelong
19:30 AEDT		Report	Waine 35'	Stadium: GMHBA Stadium; Attendance: 1,217; Referee: Jack Morgan

== Statistics ==
=== Appearances and goals ===
Players with no appearances not included in the list.

No.	Pos.	Nat.	Name	A-League Men		FFA Cup		Total	
No.	Pos.	Nat.	Name	Apps	Goals	Apps	Goals	Apps	Goals
1	GK	(England)	Jamie Young	30	0	1	0	31	0
4	DF	(Switzerland)	Léo Lacroix	27	3	1	0	28	3
5	DF	(Australia)	Dylan Pierias	11(14)	2	1(1)	0	27	2
6	DF	(Japan)	Tomoki Imai	26(1)	0	1	0	28	0
8	FW	(Australia)	Lachlan Wales	29(1)	4	1	1	31	4
9	FW	(Australia)	Dylan Wenzel-Halls	12(15)	5	1	0	28	5
10	MF	(Australia)	Steven Lustica	25(1)	5	1	0	27	5
11	MF	(Australia)	Connor Pain	23(3)	3	1	0	27	3
12	DF	(Australia)	Dalibor Markovic	0	0	1	0	1	0
16	MF	(Slovenia)	Rene Krhin	12(5)	1	0	0	17	1
17	DF	(Australia)	Ben Garuccio	28	2	1	0	29	2
19	DF	(Australia)	Josh Risdon	19(2)	0	1	0	22	0
23	MF	(Italy)	Alessandro Diamanti	10	0	1	0	10	0
25	MF	(Australia)	Luke Duzel	0	0	1	0	1	0
26	FW	(Australia)	Nicolas Milanovic	1(10)	1	1	0	12	1
27	MF	(Australia)	Jerry Skotadis	5(12)	0	1(1)	0	19	0
31	MF	(Australia)	Adisu Bayew	4(12)	2	1	0	17	2
33	DF	(Australia)	Ben Collins	0(2)	0	0	0	2	0
34	FW	(Australia)	Christian Theoharous	1(3)	0	1	0	5	0
37	GK	(Australia)	Ryan Scott	0	0	1	0	1	0
38	FW	(Australia)	Noah Botic	0(3)	0	0	0	3	0
39	FW	(Australia)	Sabit James	0	0	0(1)	0	1	0
42	MF	(Australia)	Rhys Bozinovski	0(4)	0	0	0	4	0
44	DF	(Australia)	Nikolai Topor-Stanley	18(3)	1	1	0	22	2
55	DF	(Australia)	Daniel Di Francesco	0	0	1	0	1	0
88	MF	(Australia)	Neil Kilkenny	25(1)	0	1	0	27	0
99	FW	(Serbia)	Aleksandar Prijović	24(3)	13	0(1)	1	28	14

=== Disciplinary record ===
The list is sorted by squad number when total cards are equal. Players with no cards not included in the list.

Rank	No.	Pos.	Nat.	Name	A-League Men			FFA Cup			Total		
Rank	No.	Pos.	Nat.	Name	Yellow card	Second yellow card	Red card	Yellow card	Second yellow card	Red card	Yellow card	Second yellow card	Red card
1	6	DF	(Japan)	Tomoki Imai	6	0	1	0	0	0	6	0	1
2	4	DF	(Switzerland)	Léo Lacroix	8	0	0	0	0	0	8	0	0
3	19	DF	(Australia)	Josh Risdon	7	0	0	0	0	0	7	0	0
4	44	DF	(Australia)	Nikolai Topor-Stanley	5	0	0	1	0	0	6	0	0
5	8	FW	(Australia)	Lachlan Wales	5	0	0	0	0	0	5	0	0
6	9	FW	(Australia)	Dylan Wenzel-Halls	4	0	0	0	0	0	4	0	0
6	88	MF	(Australia)	Neil Kilkenny	4	0	0	0	0	0	4	0	0
8	10	MF	(Australia)	Steven Lustica	2	0	0	1	0	0	3	0	0
8	11	FW	(Australia)	Connor Pain	3	0	0	0	0	0	3	0	0
8	23	MF	(Italy)	Alessandro Diamanti	3	0	0	0	0	0	3	0	0
8	99	FW	(Serbia)	Aleksandar Prijović	3	0	0	0	0	0	3	0	0
12	26	FW	(Australia)	Nicolas Milanovic	2	0	0	0	0	0	2	0	0
12	27	MF	(Australia)	Jerry Skotadis	2	0	0	0	0	0	2	0	0
13	5	DF	(Australia)	Dylan Pierias	1	0	0	0	0	0	1	0	0
13	16	MF	(Slovenia)	Rene Krhin	1	0	0	0	0	0	1	0	0
13	17	DF	(Australia)	Ben Garuccio	1	0	0	0	0	0	1	0	0
13	34	FW	(Australia)	Christian Theoharous	1	0	0	0	0	0	1	0	0
13	42	MF	(Australia)	Rhys Bozinovski	1	0	0	0	0	0	1	0	0

=== Clean sheets ===
Rank	No.	Pos	Nat	Name	A-League	FFA Cup	Total
1	1	GK	(England)	Jamie Young	12	0	12

== See also ==
- 2021–22 in Australian soccer
- List of Western United FC seasons
