= 2025–26 Western United FC season =

Western United
2025–26 season
- Owner: Western Melbourne Group, Sayers Road Investment Co, Jaszac Investments - Jason Sourasis, Theodore Andriopoulos, Steve Horvat, Levent Shevki and John Tripodi
- Head Coach: John Aloisi
- Stadium: Ironbark Fields; AAMI Park
- A-League Men: Did not participate
- Australia Cup: Round of 32
- Biggest defeat: 0–1 vs. Sydney FC (H) (29 July 2025); Australia Cup
- All statistics correct as of 29 July 2025.

The 2025–26 season was to be Western United Football Club's seventh season in the A-League Men, but they did not participate. Before the club lost their licence, Western United participated in this season's edition of the Australia Cup.

As of 8 August 2025, the club's license to compete in the A-League Men and A-League Women competitions has been stripped by Football Australia's independent first instance board, which oversees club licensing. The club has appealed the decision and the board will consider the club's appeal and issue a decision no later than 25 August 2025. On 2 September, Football Australia's Appeals and Entry Control Body adjourned its decision on the withdrawal of Western United's licence until 9 September. On 6 September 2025, the club's A-Leagues participation was paused for the 2025–26 season, with the possibility of returning at a later date.

== Players ==
Following the hibernation of the club's participation in the A-League Men ahead of the 2025-26 season, all senior players were released from their contracts. Therefore, the player list below represents the squad at the time of withdrawal of the club's licence.

As of 19 August 2025

Note: Flags indicate national team as defined under FIFA eligibility rules; some limited exceptions apply. Players may hold more than one non-FIFA nationality.

No.	Pos.	Nation	Player
5	FW	AUS	Oliver Lavale (scholarship)
6	DF	JPN	Tomoki Imai (vice-captain)
9	FW	JPN	Hiroshi Ibusuki
10	MF	AUS	Matthew Grimaldi
13	DF	AUS	Tate Russell
14	FW	AUS	Jake Najdovski
17	DF	AUS	Ben Garuccio (captain)
20	FW	AUS	Abel Walatee (scholarship)
21	MF	AUS	Sebastian Pasquali
23	MF	AUS	Rhys Bozinovski
29	DF	IRQ	Charbel Shamoon (scholarship)

No.	Pos.	Nation	Player
30	DF	AUS	Dylan Leonard (scholarship)
32	MF	AUS	Angus Thurgate
33	GK	AUS	Matt Sutton
34	MF	AUS	James York (scholarship)
35	GK	AUS	Alex Nassiep (scholarship)
37	FW	AUS	Luke Vickery (scholarship)
41	DF	AUS	Besian Kutleshi (scholarship)
43	DF	LBN	Khoder Kaddour (scholarship)
44	MF	AUS	Jordan Lauton
47	DF	NZL	Luka Coveny (scholarship)
70	GK	AUS	Michael Vonja

== Transfers and contracts ==
=== Transfers in ===
No.	Position	Name	From	Type/fee	Contract length	Date	Ref.
11	FW	Jaiden Kucharski	Unattached	Free transfer	2 years	8 July 2025	

=== Transfers out ===
No.	Position	Name	To	Type/fee	Date	Ref.
19	FW	Noah Botic	Austria Vienna	End of contract	29 June 2025	
4	DF	James Donachie	(Australia) Sydney Olympic	End of contract	30 June 2025	
7	FW	Ramy Najjarine	Unattached	End of contract	30 June 2025	
22	DF	Kane Vidmar	Unattached	End of contract	30 June 2025	
24	FW	Michael Ruhs	Brisbane Roar	End of contract	30 June 2025	
77	MF	(Japan) Riku Danzaki	Unattached	End of contract	30 June 2025	
11	FW	Jaiden Kucharski	Unattached	Mutual contract termination	19 August 2025	

Listed below are the players who were at the club at time of the hibernation announcement, on 6 September 2025, and the clubs they joined if signed in the current transfer window.

Name	New club
Rhys Bozinovski	Perth Glory
(New Zealand) Luka Coveny	Unattached
Ben Garuccio	Sydney FC
Matthew Grimaldi	Melbourne Victory
(Japan) Hiroshi Ibusuki	(India) East Bengal
(Japan) Tomoki Imai	(Japan) Machida Zelvia
(Lebanon) Khoder Kaddour	(Australia) South Melbourne
Besian Kutleshi	Melbourne City
Jordan Lauton	Brisbane Roar
Oliver Lavale	(Australia) South Melbourne
Dylan Leonard	(Germany) Schalke 04
Jake Najdovski	Adelaide United
Alex Nassiep	Newcastle Jets
Sebastian Pasquali	(Australia) South Melbourne
Tate Russell	(Australia) Wollongong Wolves
(Iraq) Charbel Shamoon	Perth Glory
Matt Sutton	Perth Glory
Angus Thurgate	Western Sydney Wanderers
Luke Vickery	Macarthur FC
Michael Vonja	Unattached
Abel Walatee	Sydney FC
James York	Unattached

=== Contract extensions ===
No.	Name	Position	Duration	Date	Notes	Ref.
29	(Iraq) Charbel Shamoon	Right-back	1 year	6 July 2025	Became free agents on 6 September after the hibernation of Western United's participation this season	
17	Ben Garuccio	Left-back	2 years	14 July 2025	Became free agents on 6 September after the hibernation of Western United's participation this season	

== Pre-season and friendlies ==
Win Draw Loss Fixtures

21 July 2025	Oakleigh Cannons (Australia)	0–3	(Australia) Western United	Melbourne
19:30 AEST		Report	Najdovski 29', 55'; Kucharski 87'	Stadium: Jack Edwards Reserve

== Competitions ==
=== Overall record ===
Competition	First match	Last match	Starting round	Final position	Record							
Competition	First match	Last match	Starting round	Final position	Pld	W	D	L	GF	GA	GD	Win %
Australia Cup	29 July 2025	29 July 2025	Round of 32	Round of 32	1	0	0	1	0	1	−1	0.00
Total					1	0	0	1	0	1	−1	0.00

Last updated: 29 July 2025
Source: Competitions

=== A-League Men ===
Did not participate.

=== Australia Cup ===
29 July 2025 Round of 32	Western United	0–1	Sydney FC	Melbourne
19:30 AEST		Report	Macallister 75'	Stadium: Ironbark Fields; Attendance: 1,347; Referee: Jack Morgan

== Statistics ==
=== Appearances and goals ===
Includes all competitions. Players with no appearances not included in the list.

As of match played 29 July 2025

No.	Pos.	Nat.	Name	Australia Cup		Total	
No.	Pos.	Nat.	Name	Apps	Goals	Apps	Goals
5	FW	(Australia)	Oliver Lavale	1	0	1	0
6	DF	(Japan)	Tomoki Imai	1	0	1	0
10	MF	(Australia)	Matthew Grimaldi	1	0	1	0
13	DF	(Australia)	Tate Russell	1	0	1	0
14	FW	(Australia)	Jake Najdovski	1	0	1	0
20	FW	(Australia)	Abel Walatee	1	0	1	0
23	MF	(Australia)	Rhys Bozinovski	1	0	1	0
30	DF	(Australia)	Dylan Leonard	1	0	1	0
32	MF	(Australia)	Angus Thurgate	1	0	1	0
33	GK	(Australia)	Matt Sutton	1	0	1	0
37	FW	(Australia)	Luke Vickery	0+1	0	1	0
41	DF	(Australia)	Besian Kutleshi	1	0	1	0
43	DF	(Lebanon)	Khoder Kaddour	0+1	0	1	0
44	MF	(Australia)	Jordan Lauton	0+1	0	1	0
48	FW	(Australia)	Mark Leonard	0+1	0	1	0
Player(s) transferred out but featured this season

=== Disciplinary record ===
Includes all competitions. The list is sorted by squad number when total cards are equal. Players with no cards not included in the list.

As of match played 29 July 2025

Rank	No.	Pos.	Nat.	Name	Australia Cup			Total							
Rank	No.	Pos.	Nat.	Name	Booked	(yellow card) (yellow-red card)	Sent off (straight red)	Booked	(yellow card) (yellow-red card)	Sent off (straight red)					
Rank	No.	Pos.	Nat.	Name	1	6	DF	(Japan)	Tomoki Imai	1	0	0	1	0	0
23	MF	(Australia)	Rhys Bozinovski	1	1	0	0	1	0	0					
Total					2	0	0	2	0	0					

=== Clean sheets ===
Includes all competitions.

As of match played 29 July 2025

Rank	No.	Nat.	Goalkeeper	Australia Cup	Total
1	33	(Australia)	Matt Sutton	0	0
Total				0	0

== See also ==
- 2025–26 Western United FC (women) season
