= Dalibor Markovic =

Australian professional soccer player (born 2002)

Personal information
- Full name: Dalibor Markovic
- Date of birth: 17 January 2002 (age 24)
- Place of birth: Australia
- Position: Left back

Team information
- Current team: Heidelberg United
- Number: 12

Youth career
- Marconi Stallions

Senior career*
Years	Team	Apps	(Gls)
2018–2019	Melbourne City NPL	24	(0)
2019–2021	Melbourne Victory	4	(0)
2021–2023	Western United	3	(0)
2021–2023	Western United NPL	12	(2)
2023–2024	Preston Lions	16	(1)
2024–2025	Green Gully	18	(0)
2025–	Heidelberg United	13	(0)

International career^{‡}
2017	Australia U-17	1	(0)
Medal record
Men's football
Representing Australia
AFF U-16 Youth Championship
Third place	2017 Thailand	U-17 Team
- * Club domestic league appearances and goals as of 18 September 2025 ‡ National team caps and goals as of 20 July 2017

Dalibor Markovic (born 17 January 2002) is an Australian professional soccer player who currently plays as a left back for Heidelberg United in the NPL Victoria.

== Club career ==
=== Melbourne Victory ===
On 24 February 2021, Markovic made his debut in the A-League against Wellington Phoenix in a 2–0 win by finishing the full 90 minutes and was impressed by head coach Grant Brebner.

=== Western United ===
It was announced on 12 April 2021 that Markovic will switch Victorian clubs to join Melbourne Victory's cross-town rivals Western United. In an interview with A-League Access, Markovic stated that his move to Western United was due to uncertainty with an expected club restructure. Furthermore, he stated that his move was "best for [his] development". Two weeks later, he made his Western United debut in a 2–0 home win against Newcastle Jets.

=== Preston Lions ===
On 15 February 2023, Markovic signed with Preston Lions FC for NPL 2 Victoria 2023 season.

== Personal life ==
Dalibor's father played for FK Partizan Belgrade as a goalkeeper.

== Career statistics ==
=== Club ===
As of 21 January 2022

Appearances and goals by club, season and competition
Club	Season	League			National Cup		Asia		Other		Total	
Club	Season	Division	Apps	Goals	Apps	Goals	Apps	Goals	Apps	Goals	Apps	Goals
Melbourne City NPL	2019	NPL Victoria 2	24	0	—		—		—		24	0
Melbourne Victory	2020–21	A-League	4	0	—		—		—		4	0
Western United	2020–21	A-League	3	0	—		—		—		3	0
Western United	2021–22	A-League Men	0	0	1	0	—		—		1	0
Western United NPL	2021	NPL Victoria 3	2	0	—		—		—		2	0
Career total			33	0	1	0	0	0	0	0	34	0

=== International ===
As of match played 20 July 2017.

Appearances and goals by national team, year and competition
Team	Year	Competitive		Friendly		Total	
Team	Year	Apps	Goals	Apps	Goals	Apps	Goals
Australia U17	2017	1 (Note: Appearance in the 2018 AFC U-16 Championship qualification)	0	0	0	1	0
