= 2025–26 Western United FC (women) season =

4th season in existence of Western United FC (women)

Western United
2025–26 season
- Chairman: Jason Sourasis
- Manager: Kat Smith
- Stadium: Ironbark Fields
- All statistics correct as of 21 July 2025.

The 2025–26 season was to be Western United Football Club (women)'s fourth season in the A-League Women, but they did not participate.

As of 8 August 2025, the club's license to compete in the A-League Men and A-League Women competitions has been stripped by Football Australia's independent first instance board, which oversees club licensing. The club has appealed the decision and the board will consider the club's appeal and issue a decision no later than 25 August 2025. On 2 September, Football Australia's Appeals and Entry Control Body adjourned its decision on the withdrawal of Western United's licence until 9 September. On 6 September 2025, the club's A-Leagues participation was paused for the 2025–26 season, with the possibility of returning at a later date.

== Players ==
=== First-team squad ===
Following the hibernation of the club's participation in the A-League Women ahead of the 2025–26 season, all senior players were released from their contracts. Therefore, the player list below represents the squad at the time of withdrawal of the club's licence.

As of 3 September 2025

Note: Flags indicate national team as defined under FIFA eligibility rules; some limited exceptions apply. Players may hold more than one non-FIFA nationality.

No.	Pos.	Nation	Player
1	GK	AUS	Alyssa Dall'Oste
2	MF	AUS	Emily Roach
4	DF	AUS	Claudia Mihocic
5	DF	AUS	Aimee Medwin
7	FW	AUS	Kiara De Domizio
8	MF	AUS	Sasha Grove
13	MF	AUS	Avaani Prakash
15	MF	AUS	Adriana Taranto

No.	Pos.	Nation	Player
16	MF	AUS	Melissa Taranto
18	DF	AUS	Grace Maher (vice-captain)
19	FW	AUS	Alana Cortellino
22	DF	AUS	Alana Cerne
24	DF	AUS	Julia Sardo
26	GK	AUS	Natalie Picak
28	DF	COL	Isabel Dehakiz

== Transfers ==
=== Transfers out ===
No.	Position	Player	Transferred to	Type/fee	Date	Ref
36	GK	Chloe Lincoln	Brisbane Roar	End of contract	10 June 2025	
34	FW	(United States) Catherine Zimmerman	(United States) Brooklyn FC	End of contract	19 June 2025	
9	MF	(Philippines) Sara Eggesvik	(Norway) LSK Kvinner	End of contract	5 August 2025	
20	MF	(Japan) Keiwa Hieda	(Thailand) College of Asian Scholars	End of contract	22 August 2025	
11	FW	(Colombia) Sandra Ibarguen	Unattached	End of contract	29 August 2025	
6	MF	Chloe Berryhill	(Italy) Como 1907	End of contract	3 September 2025	

Listed below are the players who were at the club at time of the hibernation announcement, on 6 September 2025, and the clubs they joined if signed in the current transfer window.

Name	New club
Alana Cerne	Western Sydney Wanderers
Alana Cortellino	Unattached
Alyssa Dall'Oste	Perth Glory
Kiara De Domizio	Canberra United
(Colombia) Isabel Dehakiz	Unattached
Sasha Grove	Canberra United
Grace Maher	Melbourne Victory
Aimee Medwin	Brisbane Roar
Claudia Mihocic	Unattached
Natalie Picak	Melbourne Victory
Avaani Prakash	Central Coast Mariners
Emily Roach	(Philippines) Stallion Laguna
Julia Sardo	Perth Glory
Adriana Taranto	Adelaide United
Melissa Taranto	Adelaide United

=== Contract extensions ===
No.	Player	Position	Duration	Date	Ref.
24	Julia Sardo	Defender	1 year	11 June 2025	
4	Claudia Mihocic	Defender	1 year	13 June 2025	
7	Kiara De Domizio	Forward	1 year	18 June 2025	
15	Adriana Taranto	Midfielder	1 year	20 June 2025	

== See also ==
- 2025–26 Western United FC season
