= Ben Collins (soccer, born 2000) =

Australian professional soccer

Benjamin Collins
Personal information
- Full name: Benjamin Parsons Collins
- Date of birth: 15 January 2000 (age 26)
- Place of birth: Australia
- Position: Central defender

Team information
- Current team: Heidelberg United
- Number: 3

Senior career*
Years	Team	Apps	(Gls)
2017–2020	Northcote City	31	(2)
2021–2023	Western United NPL	20	(0)
2021–2023	Western United	2	(0)
2023	Melbourne Knights	9	(0)
2024–	Heidelberg United	52	(4)
- * Club domestic league appearances and goals as of 15 August 2025

Benjamin Parsons Collins (born 15 January 2000) is an Australian professional soccer player who plays as a defender for Heidelberg United in the NPL Victoria.

== Club career ==
Collins began his senior career with Northcote City in the NPL Victoria and NPL Victoria 2.

In early 2021, he joined the Western United NPL side in NPL Victoria 3, serving as team captain. He played in every match of the season, prior to the season's cancellation due to the COVID-19 pandemic. Afterwards, he began training with the first team.

In November 2021, Collins signed with A-League Team Western United. He made his professional debut on 7 December 2021 in an FFA Cup match against A-League Men side Wellington Phoenix. At the conclusion of the 2022-23 season, after 6 appearances in all competitions and only 2 in the league, Collins was released by Western United.

In June 2023, Collins joined the Melbourne Knights in the NPL Victoria.

In 2024, Collins signed with Heidelberg United in the NPL Victoria, serving as captain for the 2025 and 2026 seasons.

== Career statistics ==
As of 14 August 2022

Appearances and goals by club, season and competition
Club	Season	League			Playoffs		National Cup		Other		Total	
Club	Season	Division	Apps	Goals	Apps	Goals	Apps	Goals	Apps	Goals	Apps	Goals
Northcote City	2017	NPL Victoria 2	1	0	—		0	0	—		1	0
Northcote City	2018	NPL Victoria	4	1	—		1	0	—		5	1
Northcote City	2019	NPL Victoria 2	26	1	—		3	0	—		29	1
Northcote City	Total		31	2	—		4	0	—		35	2
Western United NPL	2021	NPL Victoria 3	14	0	—		—		—		14	0
Western United NPL	2022	NPL Victoria 3	3	0	1	0	—		—		4	0
Western United NPL	Total		17	0	1	0	—		—		18	0
Western United	2021–22	A-League Men	1	0	—		1	0	—		2	0
Western United	2022–23	A-League Men	1	0	—		2	0	—		2	0
Western United	Total		2	0	—		3	0	—		4	0
Melbourne Knights	2023	NPL Victoria	7	0	2	0	0	0	—		9	0
Heidelberg United	2024	NPL Victoria	27	3	0	0	0	0	—		17	3
Career total			64	5	3	0	7	0	0	0	73	5
