= Adisu Bayew =

Australian soccer player (born 2001)

Personal information
- Full name: Adisu Bayew
- Date of birth: 27 December 2001 (age 24)
- Place of birth: Sudan
- Height: 1.81 m (5 ft 11 in)
- Position: Winger

Team information
- Current team: Hume City
- Number: 12

Youth career
- Melbourne Lions
- Sunshine George Cross
- 2017–2019: Green Gully

Senior career*
Years	Team	Apps	(Gls)
2019–2020	Green Gully	27	(3)
2020–2023	Western United NPL	14	(2)
2021–2023	Western United	25	(2)
2023	Moreland City	18	(1)
2024–	Green Gully	2	(0)

International career^{‡}
2021–	Australia U23	2	(0)
- * Club domestic league appearances and goals as of 11 July 2024 ‡ National team caps and goals as of 1 November 2021

Adisu Bayew (born 27 December 2001), is an Australian professional soccer player who plays as a winger for Hume City.

== Career ==
=== Western United ===
Having joined Western United's NPL set up in 2020, Bayew made his A-League debut for Western United on 22 May 2021. Bayew scored his first senior goal in a 3–2 win over Brisbane Roar in March 2022.

At the conclusion of the 2022–23 season, Bayew was released by Western United.

== Personal life ==
Bayew is of Sudanese descent.
