= Jake Najdovski =

Australian (born 2007)

Personal information
- Date of birth: 14 March 2005 (age 21)
- Place of birth: Melbourne, Victoria, Australia
- Height: 1.76 m (5 ft 9 in)
- Position: Striker

Team information
- Current team: Adelaide United
- Number: 18

Youth career
- 2021–2023: Western United

Senior career*
Years	Team	Apps	(Gls)
2021–2025	Western United VPL	43	(34)
2022–2025	Western United	15	(0)
2025–	Adelaide United	2	(0)
2026–	Adelaide United NPL	2	(0)

International career
2024	Australia U20	7	(5)
- * Club domestic league appearances and goals as of 29 April 2026

Jake Najdovski (Macedonian: Џејк Најдовски, romanized: Džejk Najdovski, pronounced [ˈnajdɔvski]; born 14 March 2005) is an Australian professional soccer player who plays as a striker for Adelaide United.

== Club career ==
A youth product of Keilor Football Star Academy, Najdoski moved to Western United's academy in 2021. On 5 July 2022 he signed his first professional contract with the club until 2024. He debuted with Western United in a 4–0 Australia Cup win over Edgeworth FC on 9 August 2023. On 22 September 2023, he extended his contract with the club until 2026. Following the suspension of Western United's participation ahead of the 2025–26 season, all players – including Najdovski – were released from their contracts in September 2025.

== International career ==
Born in Australia, Najdoski is of Macedonian descent. He was part of the Australia U19s who came third at the 2024 ASEAN U-19 Boys Championship where he was the top scorer with 5 goals.

== Honours ==
=== Individual ===
- 2024 ASEAN U-19 Boys Championship top scorer
