= Khoder Kaddour =

Footballer (born 2003)

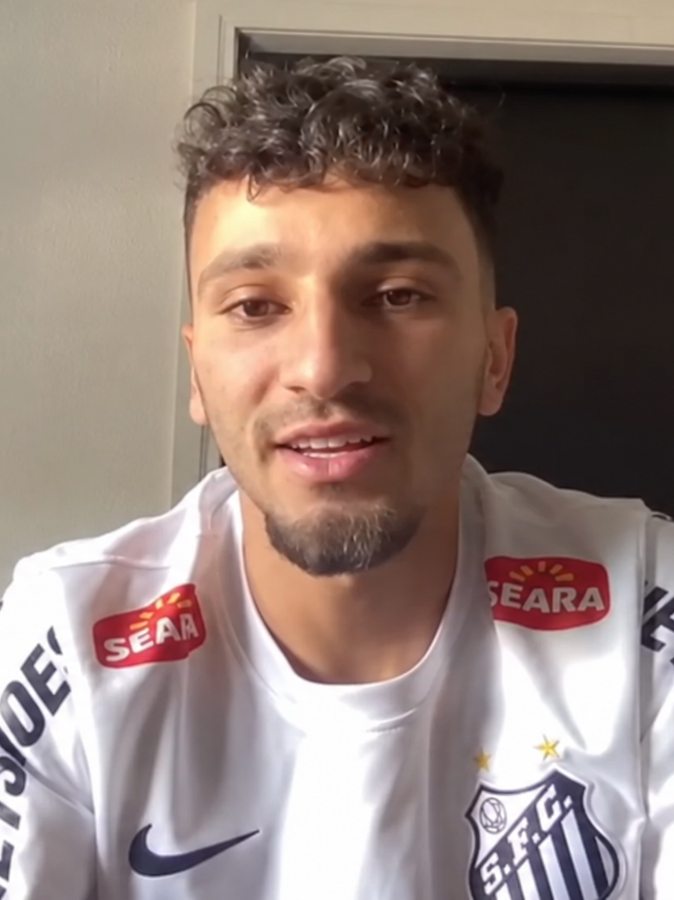
- Kaddour in 2025

Personal information
- Full name: Khoder Khaled Kaddour
- Date of birth: 6 September 2003 (age 23)
- Place of birth: Carlton, Victoria, Australia
- Height: 1.81 m (5 ft 11 in)
- Positions: Right-back; right midfielder

Team information
- Current team: Sydney Olympic
- Number: 29

Youth career
- 2009–2017: Fawkner
- 2017–2019: Whittlesea Ranges
- 2021: Melbourne City
- 2022: Western United

Senior career*
Years	Team	Apps	(Gls)
2021	Melbourne City Youth	3	(0)
2022–2025	Western United Youth	59	(3)
2024–2025	Western United	5	(0)
2025	South Melbourne	0	(0)
2026	Hume City	25	(3)
2026–	Sydney Olympic	0	(0)

International career^{‡}
2026–	Lebanon U23	3	(0)
2025–	Lebanon	5	(0)
- * Club domestic league appearances and goals as of 29 August 2026 ‡ National team caps and goals as of 13 January 2026

Khoder Khaled Kaddour (Arabic: خضر خالد قدّور; born 6 September 2003) is a professional footballer who plays as a right-back or right midfielder for Australian club Sydney Olympic. Born in Australia, he plays for the Lebanon national team.

== Early life ==
Kaddour was born and raised in Carlton, a suburb of Melbourne, Australia, to Lebanese parents from Halba.

== Club career ==
=== Youth career ===
Kaddour began his football career at local club Fawkner, where he played from the under-7s to the under-15s. Between 2017 and 2019, Kaddour played for Whittlesea Ranges, from the under-14s to under-20s. Kaddour was not selected for Victoria's youth representative teams and said he only began to improve significantly around the age of 16, after increasing his training, including individual sessions before school.

During high school, Kaddour participated in a Melbourne City development program, through which he entered the club's academy in 2021. In 2022, Kaddour joined Western United's youth team.

=== Western United ===
Kaddour made his A-League debut for Western United on 20 February 2024, starting in a 2–1 defeat to Melbourne Victory. On 16 April 2024, he sustained an ACL injury in a match against Adelaide United, which sidelined him for almost a year. He finished the 2023–24 season with five appearances.

On 3 June 2024, ahead of the 2024–25 season, Kaddour signed a two-year professional contract with Western United. He returned from injury in February 2025, and played for the reserve team in the 2025 Victoria Premier League 1. His only senior-team appearance after the injury came in the 2025 Australia Cup against Sydney FC on 29 July 2025, when he entered as a stoppage-time substitute in a 1–0 defeat.

Following the suspension of Western United's participation ahead of the 2025–26 season, all players – including Kaddour – were released from their contracts in September 2025.

=== South Melbourne, Hume City, Sydney Olympic ===
On 18 September 2025, Kaddour joined NPL Victoria side South Melbourne ahead of the inaugural 2025 Australian Championship. He helped the club win the title, defeating Marconi Stallions 2–0 in the final.

After South Melbourne offered him a contract extension to compete in the 2026 OFC Professional League, Kaddour opted to leave in search of regular first-team football. He joined Hume City on 30 January 2026 ahead of the 2026 NPL Victoria season. He made 25 appearances and scored three goals in the competition, earning a place in the Young Team of the Season.

On 19 September 2026, Kaddour joined Sydney Olympic for the 2026 Australian Championship.

== International career ==
Through his parents' Lebanese heritage, Kaddour was eligible to represent Lebanon internationally. Following his A-League debut in February 2024, Kaddour said that the Lebanon national team had contacted him and remained in contact with him during his subsequent ACL rehabilitation.

Kaddour received his first call-up on 13 August 2025 from coach Miodrag Radulović for an unofficial (Note: The match was not considered an official international fixture, as it was played in two 35-minute halves (70 minutes in total).) friendly against Qatar on 24 August. He said that he was invited as part of Lebanon's assessment of him, alongside fellow Australian-born Lebanese player Ramy Najjarine. Kaddour scored the only goal in a 1–0 win, assisted by Najjarine. His official debut came on 8 September 2025, in a 0–0 friendly draw against Indonesia.

Kaddour was called up to the Lebanon national under-23 team for the 2026 AFC U-23 Asian Cup, held in Saudi Arabia in January 2026. He appeared in all three group-stage games for Lebanon.

== Personal life ==
Kaddour supports Manchester United, and grew up supporting Melbourne Victory. Outside football, he works in his family's egg-delivery business.

== Career statistics ==
=== Club ===
As of match played 12 September 2026

Appearances and goals by club, season and competition
Club	Season	League			Australia Cup		Other		Total	
Club	Season	Division	Apps	Goals	Apps	Goals	Apps	Goals	Apps	Goals
Melbourne City Youth	2021	NPL 3 VIC	3	0	—		—		3	0
Western United Youth	2022	NPL 3 VIC	16	1	—		—		16	1
Western United Youth	2023	NPL 2 VIC	26	1	—		—		26	1
Western United Youth	2024	VPL 1	4	0	—		—		4	0
Western United Youth	2025	VPL 1	13	1	—		—		13	1
Western United Youth	Total		59	3	0	0	0	0	59	3
Western United	2023–24	A-League	5	0	—		—		5	0
Western United	2024–25	A-League	0	0	—		—		0	0
Western United	2025–26	—			1	0	—		1	0
Western United	Total		5	0	1	0	0	0	6	0
South Melbourne	2025	—			—		4 (Note: Appearances in Australian Championship)	0	4	0
Hume City	2026	NPL VIC	25	3	—		3 (Note: Two appearances in Dockerty Cup; one appearance in NPL VIC finals)	0	28	3
Sydney Olympic	2026	—			—		0	0	0	0
Career total			92	6	1	0	7	0	100	6

=== International ===
As of match played 26 November 2025

Appearances and goals by national team and year
National team	Year	Apps	Goals
Lebanon	2025	5	0
Total		5	0

== Honours ==
South Melbourne

- Australian Championship: 2025

Individual

- National Premier Leagues Victoria Young Team of the Season: 2026

== See also ==
- List of Lebanon international footballers born outside Lebanon
