= Charbel Shamoon =

Iraqi footballer

Personal information
- Full name: Charbel Awni Shamoon
- Date of birth: 10 February 2004 (age 22)
- Place of birth: Syria
- Height: 1.75 m (5 ft 9 in)
- Position: Right-back

Team information
- Current team: Perth Glory
- Number: 2

Youth career
- 2011–2016: Brunswick City
- 2017: Sunshine George Cross
- 2018–2022: Melbourne City
- 2022–2024: Western United

Senior career*
| Years | Team | Apps | (Gls) |
| 2022–2025 | Western United NPL | 49 | (2) |
| 2024–2025 | Western United | 22 | (0) |
| 2025– | Perth Glory | 25 | (1) |

International career^{‡}
| 2023 | Iraq U20 | 5 | (0) |
| 2025– | Iraq | 1 | (0) |
- * Club domestic league appearances and goals as of 29 April 2026 ‡ National team caps and goals as of 26 March 2025

Charbel Awni Shamoon (Arabic: شربل عوني شمعون, pronounced [ʃarˈbæl ʕuːˈni ʃamˈʕuː]; born 10 February 2004) is a professional footballer who plays as a right-back for A-League Men club Perth Glory. Born in Syria, he plays for the Iraq national team.

== Club career ==
Shamoon made his A-League debut in February 2024 as a 59th-minute substitute in a 2–0 loss away to Wellington Phoenix. Six days later, he made his starting debut in a 2–0 win against Newcastle. After making seven appearances in his debut season with Western United, he was rewarded with his first professional contract in September 2024, ahead of the 2024–25 season.

Following the suspension of Western United's participation ahead of the 2025–26 season, all players – including Shamoon – were released from their contracts in September 2025.

== International career ==
=== Iraq U20 ===
Eligible to represent Australia and Iraq, Shamoon obtained an Iraqi passport in December 2022. He was called up to a training camp of the Iraq U20 national team in Ukraine in 2022. He was then called up to the Iraq squad that travelled to Uzbekistan for the 2023 AFC U-20 Asian Cup. Despite picking up a red card, leading to a three-game suspension, Shamoon helped Iraq reach the final, who were eventually beaten by the hosts, achieving qualification to the 2023 FIFA U-20 World Cup. Having participated in the training camp in Cádiz, Spain, that preceded the tournament, Shamoon was not selected for the final squad.

=== Australia U23 ===
Since the U-20 Asian Cup, Shamoon had not been selected by any of Iraq's national teams. This, along with his performances for the first team at Western United, led to Shamoon being selected by the Australia U23 towards the end of 2024.

=== Iraq ===
After being called up to the Australian U23 set-up, Iraq senior national team manager Jesús Casas attempted to call up Shamoon for the 26th Arabian Gulf Cup in December 2024, but his club rejected to release him for international duty.

On 13 March 2025, Shamoon was called up for the Iraq national team for 2026 FIFA World Cup qualification matches against Kuwait and Palestine.

== Personal life ==
Shamoon is an Assyrian Christian.
