= Matthew Grimaldi =

Australian soccer player

- Grimaldi playing for Melbourne Victory in October 2026.

Personal information
- Full name: Matthew Grimaldi
- Date of birth: 28 November 2003 (age 22)
- Place of birth: Melbourne, Victoria, Australia
- Position: Winger

Team information
- Current team: Melbourne Victory
- Number: 14

Youth career
- Watsonia Heights FC
- Melbourne City
- 2023–: Western United

Senior career*
Years	Team	Apps	(Gls)
2021–2023	Melbourne City NPL	33	(2)
2023–2025	Western United NPL	26	(5)
2023–2025	Western United	52	(10)
2025–	Melbourne Victory	27	(2)

International career^{‡}
2025–	Australia U23	6	(2)
- * Club domestic league appearances and goals as of 20 February 2026 ‡ National team caps and goals as of 10 September 2025

Matthew Grimaldi (Italian: [ɡriˈmaldi]; born 28 November 2003) is an Australian professional footballer who plays as a winger for A-League Men club Melbourne Victory.

== Club career ==
Grimaldi playing for Melbourne Victory in 2026.

=== Western United ===
In August 2023, Grimaldi joined Western United. Following the suspension of Western United's participation ahead of the 2025–26 season, all players – including Grimaldi – were released from their contracts in September 2025.

=== Melbourne Victory ===
Grimaldi remained in the A-League following Western United's removal from the league, signing with fellow-Victorian club, Melbourne Victory.
