= Sebastian Pasquali =

Australian soccer player

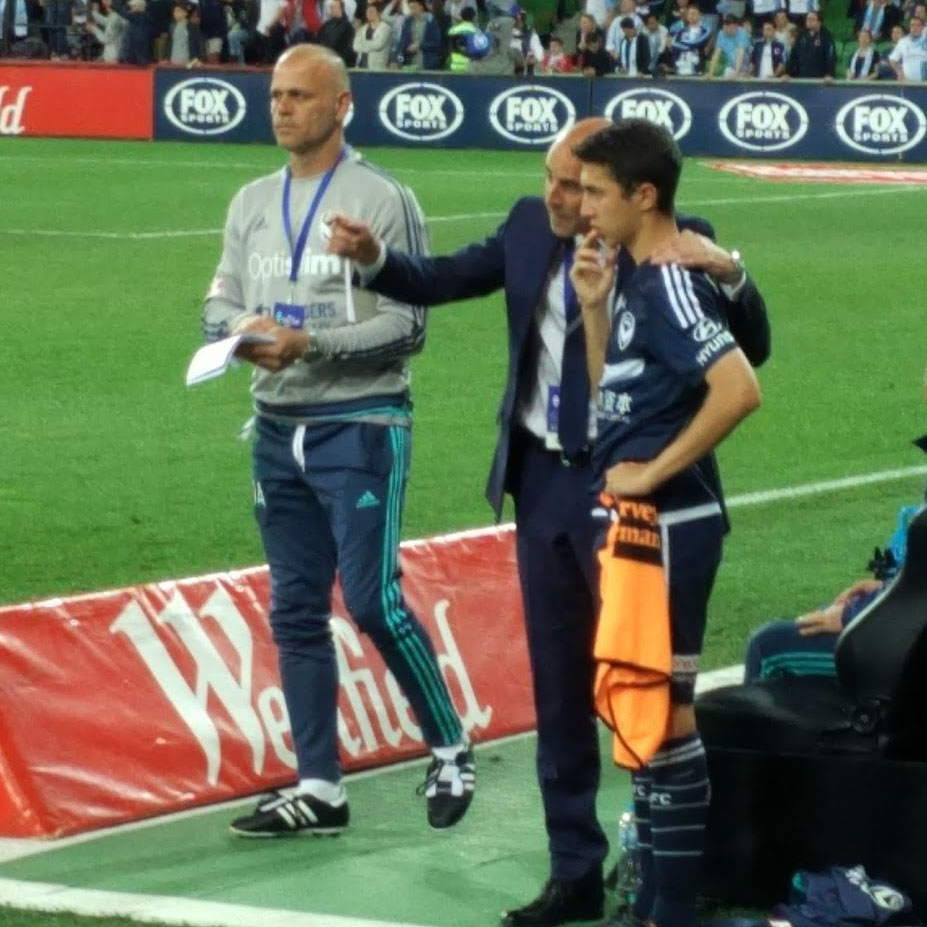
- Pasquali (right) with Melbourne Victory in 2016

Personal information
- Full name: Sebastian Pasquali
- Date of birth: 7 November 1999 (age 27)
- Place of birth: Wangaratta, Australia
- Height: 1.76 m (5 ft 9 in)
- Positions: Midfielder; centre-back

Team information
- Current team: South Melbourne
- Number: 21

Youth career
- –2014: Wangaratta City
- 2014: FFV NTC
- 2015–2016: Melbourne Victory

Senior career*
| Years | Team | Apps | (Gls) |
| 2016 | Melbourne Victory NPL | 12 | (3) |
| 2016 | Melbourne Victory | 2 | (0) |
| 2016–2019 | Jong Ajax | 17 | (0) |
| 2019–2025 | Western United | 48 | (0) |
| 2021 | Western United NPL | 5 | (0) |
| 2025– | South Melbourne | 33 | (2) |

International career^{‡}
| 2018 | Australia U20 | 3 | (0) |
| 2019 | Australia U23 | 2 | (0) |
- * Club domestic league appearances and goals as of 7 June 2026 ‡ National team caps and goals as of 25 March 2019

Sebastian Pasquali is an Australian professional footballer who plays as a box-to-box, defensive or attacking midfielder for NPL Victoria club South Melbourne FC.

== Club career ==
=== Melbourne Victory ===
Pasquali was named in Victory's inaugural youth squad in the National Premier Leagues Victoria in March 2015. Pasquali made his unofficial senior debut for Melbourne Victory in the 2016 International Champions Cup against Juventus in what was considered a stand out performance, scoring the winning kick in what finished in a 4–3 penalty victory. Pasquali made his official debut in the 2016 FFA Cup on 24 August 2016 against Hume City in the round of 16.

Pasquali made his A-League debut in the Melbourne Derby on 15 October 2016, as a 75th-minute substitute for Fahid Ben Khalfallah. In just his second appearance of the season, as a 76th-minute substitute against Adelaide United on 22 October 2016, Pasquali assisted Marco Rojas's goal in an eventual 2–1 win.

=== Ajax ===
After impressing for Victory against Juventus in the International Champions Cup, Juventus showed strong interest in Pasquali, but on 31 October 2016, Melbourne Victory announced that Pasquali had left for Ajax, not listing him in that day's match squad. Pasquali remained in Australia until his year 11 exams were completed in late November, before officially signing for Ajax. Ajax confirmed that Pasquali had signed a two-year deal in November 2016. Despite having an Italian passport, Pasquali was not able to play competitive matches for Ajax until his transfer clearance from FIFA was granted, missing out on the remainder of the season.

Pasquali started the 2017–18 season as a regular player for Ajax in the U19 Eredivisie and UEFA Youth League. He made his debut for Jong Ajax in an Eerste Divisie loss to Fortuna Sittard on 12 January 2018, having previously made three appearances on the bench, going on to play regularly at that level for the remainder of the season. Pasquali made his first team debut in the 2018–19 preseason as a 61st minute substitution in a friendly match against Steaua Bucharest.

=== Return to Australia ===
Following the suspension of Western United's participation ahead of the 2025–26 season, all players – including Pasquali – were released from their contracts in September 2025.

== International career ==
In October 2018, Pasquali was called up to the Australia U20 squad to compete in the 2018 AFC U-19 Championship held in Indonesia.

== Career statistics ==
As of 2 May 2020

| Club | Season | League | | | Cup^{[A]} | | Continental | | Total | |
| Club | Season | Division | Apps | Goals | Apps | Goals | Apps | Goals | Apps | Goals |
|---|---|---|---|---|---|---|---|---|---|---|
| Melbourne Victory Youth | 2016 | NPL Victoria | 12 | 3 | 0 | 0 | 0 | 0 | 12 | 3 |
| Melbourne Victory | 2016–17 | A-League | 2 | 0 | 2 | 0 | 0 | 0 | 4 | 0 |
| Jong Ajax | 2017–18 | Eerste Divisie | 7 | 0 | 0 | 0 | 0 | 0 | 7 | 0 |
| Jong Ajax | 2018–19 | Eerste Divisie | 10 | 0 | 0 | 0 | 0 | 0 | 10 | 0 |
| Jong Ajax | Jong Ajax total | | 17 | 0 | 0 | 0 | 0 | 0 | 17 | 0 |
| Western United | 2019–20 | A-League | 9 | 0 | 0 | 0 | 0 | 0 | 9 | 0 |
| Western United | 2020–21 | A-League | 6 | 0 | 0 | 0 | 0 | 0 | 6 | 0 |
| Western United | 2021–22 | A-League Men | 0 | 0 | 0 | 0 | 0 | 0 | 0 | 0 |
| Western United | 2022–23 | A-League Men | 0 | 0 | 0 | 0 | 0 | 0 | 0 | 0 |
| Western United | Western United total | | 15 | 0 | 0 | 0 | 0 | 0 | 15 | 0 |
| Western United (NPL) | 2021 | NPL Victoria 3 | 4 | 0 | 0 | 0 | 0 | 0 | 4 | 0 |

=== Footnotes ===
A. Includes appearances in the FFA Cup.

== Honours ==
=== Club ===
Jong Ajax

- Eerste Divisie: 2017–18

South Melbourne FC

- Australian Championship: 2025
- Australia Cup: 2026
