= Matt Sutton (soccer) =

Australian soccer player

Personal information
- Full name: Matthew Luke Sutton
- Date of birth: 7 March 2000 (age 26)
- Place of birth: Sydney, Australia
- Height: 1.94 m (6 ft 4 in)
- Position: Goalkeeper

Team information
- Current team: Perth Glory
- Number: 1

Senior career*
| Years | Team | Apps | (Gls) |
| 2016–2017 | FFA CoE | 30 | (0) |
| 2018–2020 | Melbourne Victory NPL | 35 | (0) |
| 2018–2020 | Melbourne Victory | 0 | (0) |
| 2020–2023 | Melbourne City NPL | 6 | (0) |
| 2021–2023 | Melbourne City | 3 | (0) |
| 2023–2025 | Western United | 34 | (0) |
| 2025– | Perth Glory | 26 | (0) |
- * Club domestic league appearances and goals as of 03:11, 14 January 2026 (UTC) ‡ National team caps and goals as of 25 May 2021

Matthew Luke Sutton (born 7 March 2000) is an Australian professional soccer player who plays as a goalkeeper for A-League club Perth Glory.

Sutton is currently studying a Bachelor of Commerce at Deakin University.

== Career ==
Following the suspension of Western United's participation ahead of the 2025–26 season, all players – including Sutton – were released from their contracts in September 2025.

In October 2025, Sutton joined Perth Glory on a three-month injury-replacement deal.

On 14 January 2026, the club confirmed that Sutton had signed a permanent deal for three years.

== Honours ==
Melbourne City

- A-League Men Premiership: 2022–23
