= Tate Russell =

Australian soccer player

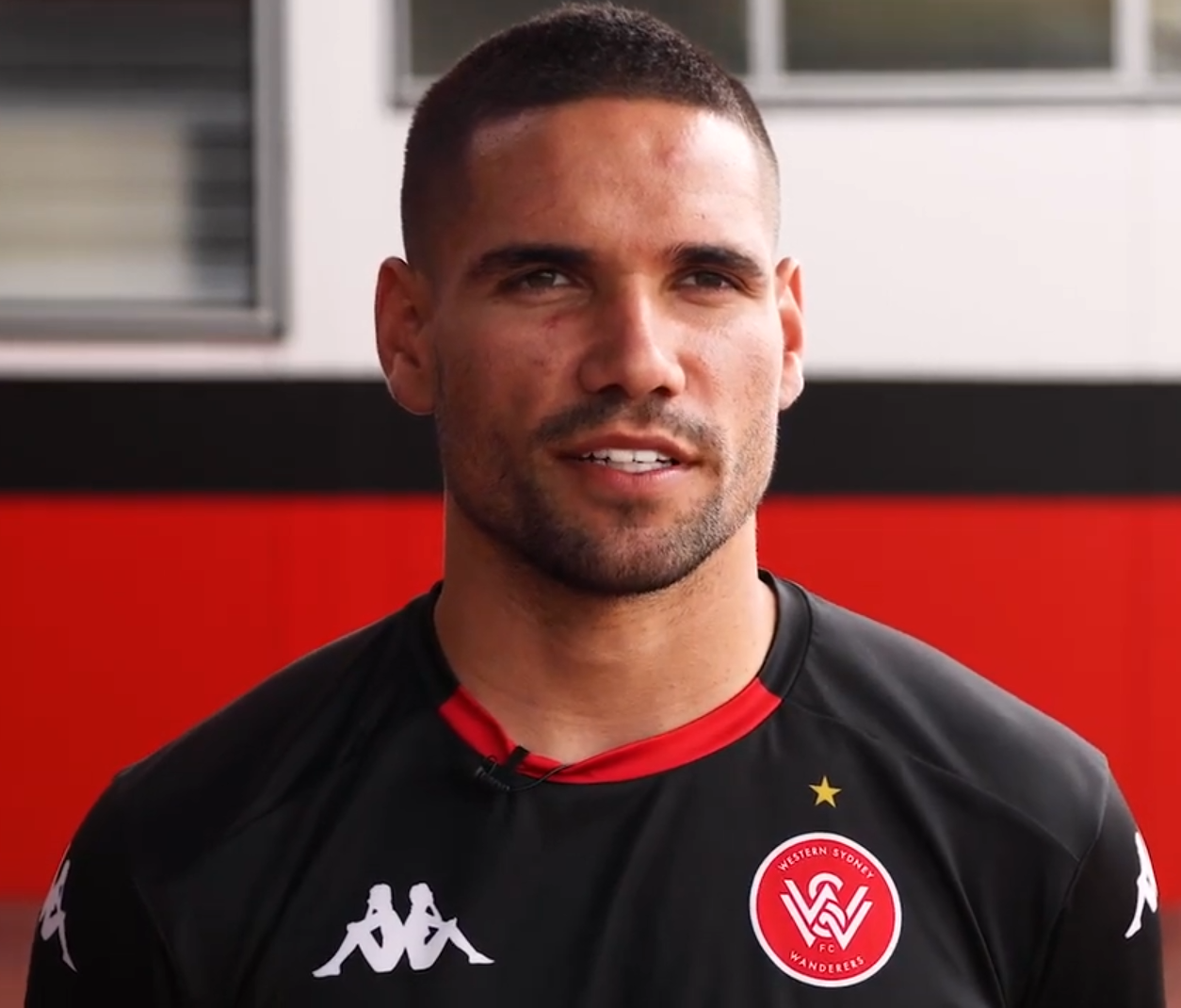
- Russell with Western Sydney Wanderers in 2022

Personal information
- Full name: Tate Russell
- Date of birth: 24 August 1999 (age 27)
- Place of birth: Wollongong, New South Wales, Australia
- Height: 1.78 m (5 ft 10 in)
- Position: Right back

Team information
- Current team: Brisbane Roar
- Number: 13

Youth career
- 2003–2008: Wollongong Olympic
- 2008–2010: Football NSW Project 22
- 2010–2014: South Coast Wolves
- 2015–2016: Western Sydney Wanderers

Senior career*
Years	Team	Apps	(Gls)
2016–2019	Western Sydney Wanderers NPL	49	(1)
2018–2024	Western Sydney Wanderers	85	(5)
2024–2025	Western United	27	(1)
2025–2026	Wollongong Wolves	18	(2)
2026–	Brisbane Roar	0	(0)

International career^{‡}
2018–2019	Australia U20	4	(0)
2019–2021	Australia U23	2	(0)
- * Club domestic league appearances and goals as of 4 May 2026 ‡ National team caps and goals as of 8 January 2021

Tate Russell (born 24 August 1999) is an Australian soccer player who plays as a right back for A-League Men club Brisbane Roar.

== Career ==
From Wollongong, Russell began his career in 2003 with the Wollongong Olympic Junior club before joining Football NSW's Project 22 in 2008. He soon joined the South Coast Wolves in 2010 and stayed with the club for four years before joining the youth ranks at Western Sydney Wanderers.

=== Western Sydney Wanderers ===
Russell was part of the 2017-18 Y-League championship winning Western Sydney Wanderers Youth team. He played the full game as they beat Melbourne City Youth 3–1 in the 2018 Y-League Grand Final on 3 February 2018.

Russell signed his first contract with Western Sydney Wanderers on 6 June 2018, penning a two-year scholarship deal with the club. He made his professional debut for Western Sydney in their Round 11 clash with Melbourne Victory on 5 January 2019, playing the full game as the Wanderers lost 2–1 at ANZ Stadium.

Russell scored his first professional goal in a Round of 16 clash against Sydney United in the 2019 FFA Cup on 28 August 2019, driving a low volley into the bottom corner for the Wanderers' fifth as they ran out 7-1 winners.

In pre-season training for the 2022/23 A-League season Russell suffered an anterior cruciate ligament injury, ruling him out for the entire season. 530 days after the injury he made his return to the league in Round 1 of the 2023/24 season. Despite the injury he earned an extended 2 season contract to keep him at the Wanderers until the 2024/25 season.

=== Western United ===
Russell left the Wanderers in June 2024 and joined Western United on a two year contract until the end of the 2025/26 season. In his first season he played in all but a handful of matches, scoring one goal as Western United finished 3rd in the A-League Premiership then fell at the semi-finals during the play-offs with a 4-1 aggregate loss to Melbourne City.

Following the suspension of Western United's participation ahead of the 2025–26 season, all players – including Russell – were released from their contracts in September 2025.

In September 2025, Russell joined Wollongong Wolves.

In June 2026, Russell returned to the A-League Men, signing with Brisbane Roar on a two-year contract.

== International ==
Russell has four caps for the Australia U20 side.

== Personal life ==
Russell is an Indigenous Australian.

He is the son of former rugby league player Ian Russell.

== Honours ==
=== Club ===
Western Sydney Wanderers

- Y-League: 2017–18
