= Rhys Bozinovski =

Australian soccer player (born 2004)

Personal information
- Date of birth: 7 March 2004 (age 22)
- Place of birth: Australia
- Height: 1.73 m (5 ft 8 in)
- Position: Defensive midfielder

Team information
- Current team: Heracles Almelo
- Number: 20

Youth career
- Spring Hills Stallions
- 2016–2017: Sunshine George Cross
- 2018–2021: Melbourne City

Senior career*
Years	Team	Apps	(Gls)
2021–2022	Western United NPL	18	(4)
2022–2025	Western United	54	(5)
2025–2026	Perth Glory	14	(0)
2026–	Heracles Almelo	8	(0)

International career^{‡}
2022	Australia U20	1	(0)
2025–	Australia U23	5	(1)
- * Club domestic league appearances and goals as of 21 May 2026 ‡ National team caps and goals as of 10 September 2025

Rhys Bozinovski (Macedonian: Рис Божиновски, romanized: Ris Božinovski, pronounced [bɔʒiˈnɔvski]; born 7 March 2004) is an Australian professional soccer player who plays as a defensive midfielder for Dutch Eerste Divisie club Heracles Almelo.

== Club career ==
=== Western United ===
On 5 August 2021, Western United announced the signing of Bozinovski to a two-year scholarship contract, initially adding him to Western United's NPL squad. Prior to joining Western United, Bozinovski had gained experience playing with Melbourne City and Sunshine George Cross at the NPL youth level. Bozinovski quickly established himself as a key player in the club's NPL 1st Grade squad, utilizing his creativity and scoring ability from midfield.

His impressive performances would help him into the first team and, not long after, make his professional club debut in the A-League against Adelaide United, on 8 May 2022, coming on as a stoppage time substitute. He would make three further appearances in A-League Finals series, mostly coming off the bench late in the game.

Ahead of the 2022–23 season, on 13 November 2022, he earned his first start, winning 2–3 away against Wellington Phoenix. On 6 December, Bozinovski extended his scholarship contract for a further two years.

Following the suspension of Western United's participation ahead of the 2025–26 season, all players – including Bozinovski – were released from their contracts in September 2025.

=== Perth Glory ===
On 19 September 2025, Perth Glory announced the signing of Bozinovski on a two-year deal.

=== Heracles Almelo ===
On 3 February 2026, Heracles Almelo announced the signing of Bozinovski on a deal until 2029.

== Personal life ==
His grandfather is former Malta captain Willie Vassallo. He is of Macedonian and Maltese descent.
