= Josh Risdon =

Australian soccer player

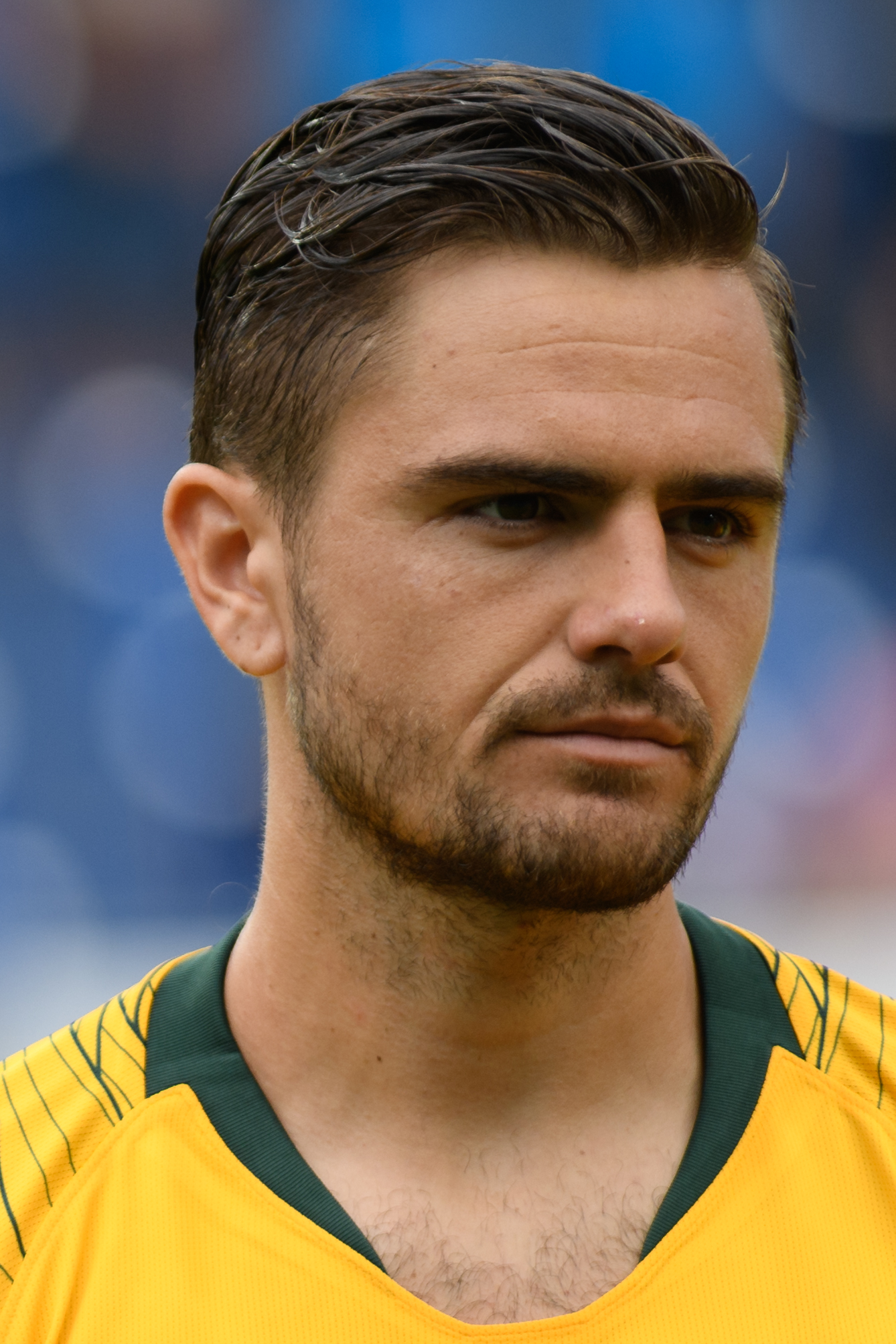
- Risdon with Australia in 2018

Personal information
- Full name: Joshua Robert Risdon
- Date of birth: 27 July 1992 (age 34)
- Place of birth: Bunbury, Australia
- Height: 1.69 m (5 ft 7 in)
- Position: Right-back

Team information
- Current team: Fremantle City
- Number: 3

Youth career
- –2008: ECU Joondalup
- 2007–2009: WA NTC
- 2008–2014: Perth Glory

Senior career*
Years	Team	Apps	(Gls)
2010–2017	Perth Glory	142	(2)
2017–2019	Western Sydney Wanderers	28	(0)
2019–2024	Western United	90	(5)
2024–2026	Perth Glory	29	(0)
2026–	Fremantle City	4	(1)

International career^{‡}
2015–2019	Australia	14	(0)
- * Club domestic league appearances and goals as of 30 May 2026 ‡ National team caps and goals as of 6 January 2019

Joshua Robert Risdon (/rɪzdən/; born 27 July 1992) is an Australian professional soccer player who played as a right-back for Fremantle City in the NPL WA.

Risdon has represented Australia on several occasions since debuting in 2015.

== Club career ==
Risdon made his senior debut for Perth Glory on 28 November 2010, starting against the North Queensland Fury. During his debut season he made six appearances in total, including three straight starts between rounds 24 and 26.

In the 2011–12 season Risdon established himself as a regular starting 24 matches at 19 years of age.

He scored his first career goal in round 26 of the 2012–13 A-League season with the winning goal in the 94th minute against Melbourne Victory (3–2).

On 20 July 2013, Risdon played for the A-League All-Stars against Manchester United in a friendly match.

Injury plagued his 2013–14 season before he returned to the starting side for 25 appearances in the 2014–15 season. He also scored his second career goal on 28 March 2015 with an 88th minute winner over Western Sydney Wanderers (3–2).

In May 2017, Risdon left the Glory and moved to Western Sydney Wanderers.

On 12 February 2019, Risden signed on a two-year deal for A-League expansion club Western United FC after his contract with Western Sydney Wanderers expired.

On 29 May 2024, Perth Glory announced Risdon's return to the club on a two-year contract.

On 22 April 2026, Risdon announced his retirement and will play his final game against Brisbane Roar in the final round of the 2025–26 A-League season, having held the record for most appearances for Perth in the post-NSL era.

== International career ==
On 7 March 2011 he was selected to represent the Australia Olympic football team in an Asian Olympic Qualifier match against Iraq.

Risdon made his senior debut for the Socceroos in a 2018 World Cup qualifying match against Bangladesh on 17 November 2015.

In May 2018 he was named in Australia’s 23-man squad for the 2018 World Cup in Russia.

== Career statistics ==
=== Club ===
As of match played 16 April 2023

Club	Season	League			Australia Cup		Asia		Total	
Club	Season	Division	Apps	Goals	Apps	Goals	Apps	Goals	Apps	Goals
Perth Glory	2010–11	A-League	6	0	–		–		6	0
Perth Glory	2011–12	A-League	24	0	–		–		24	0
Perth Glory	2012–13	A-League	26	1	–		–		26	1
Perth Glory	2013–14	A-League	12	0	–		–		12	0
Perth Glory	2014–15	A-League	25	1	5	0	–		30	1
Perth Glory	2015–16	A-League	23	0	5	0	–		28	0
Perth Glory	2016–17	A-League	26	0	1	0	–		27	0
Perth Glory	Total		142	2	11	0	0	0	153	2
Western Sydney Wanderers	2017–18	A-League	18	0	4	0	–		22	0
Western Sydney Wanderers	2018–19	A-League	10	0	3	0	–		13	0
Western Sydney Wanderers	Total		28	0	7	0	–		35	0
Western United	2019–20	A-League	23	1	0	0	–		23	1
Western United	2020–21	A-League	3	0	0	0	–		3	0
Western United	2021–22	A-League	21	0	1	0	–		22	0
Western United	2022–23	A-League	20	2	2	0	0	0	22	2
Western United	Total		67	3	3	0	0	0	70	3
Total			237	5	21	0	0	0	258	5

=== International ===
Statistics accurate as of match played 6 January 2019.

Australia
Year	Apps	Goals
2015	1	0
2016	2	0
2017	2	0
2018	8	0
2019	1	0
Total	14	0

== Honours ==
Western United

- A-League Men Championship: 2021–22

Individual

- Perth Glory Most Glorious Player: 2011–12
- A-League All Star: 2013
- PFA A-League Team of the Season: 2015–16
