= Tomoki Imai =

Japanese footballer (born 1990)

Tomoki Imai 今井 智基
Personal information
- Full name: Tomoki Imai
- Date of birth: November 29, 1990 (age 35)
- Place of birth: Tokyo, Japan
- Height: 1.78 m (5 ft 10 in)
- Position: Defender

Youth career
- Ichikawa KIFC
- Ichikawa Kanezuka SC
- 2006–2008: Omiya Ardija

College career
Years	Team	Apps	(Gls)
2009–2012	Chuo University		

Senior career*
Years	Team	Apps	(Gls)
2013–2015	Omiya Ardija	58	(2)
2015–2018	Kashiwa Reysol	5	(0)
2018–2019	Matsumoto Yamaga	25	(0)
2020–2025	Western United	135	(1)
2025–2026	Machida Zelvia	0	(0)
- * Club domestic league appearances and goals as of 11:41, 7 October 2026 (UTC)

Tomoki Imai (今井 智基, Imai Tomoki; born November 29, 1990) is a Japanese professional footballer who plays as a defender, most recently for Machida Zelvia.

== Career ==
Born in the Chiba Prefecture, Imai made his debut for Omiya Ardija of the J1 League on March 20, 2013, against Júbilo Iwata in the J.League Cup in which he came on in the 56th minute for Daisuke Watabe as Omiya suffered a 2–0 defeat.

On 11 February 2020, Imai moved to Australia, signing for A-League side Western United. Imai is only the second player in the clubs history to reach 100 games played. He was also a key part of Westerns Inaugural A-league championship in 2022. Following the suspension of Western United's participation ahead of the 2025–26 season, all players – including Imai – were released from their contracts in September 2025.

After his departure from Western United, Imai returned to Japan and signed for Machida Zelvia.

== Club statistics ==
As of 7 October 2026.

Appearances and goals by club, season and competition
Club	Season	League			National cup (Note: Includes Emperor's Cup, Australia Cup)		League cup (Note: Includes J.League Cup)		Continental		Total	
Club	Season	Division	Apps	Goals	Apps	Goals	Apps	Goals	Apps	Goals	Apps	Goals
Omiya Ardija	2013	J.League Division 1	23	1	2	1	5	0	–		30	2
Omiya Ardija	2014	J.League Division 1	30	1	3	0	6	0	–		39	1
Omiya Ardija	2015	J2 League	5	0	0	0	0	0	–		5	0
Omiya Ardija	Total		58	2	5	1	11	0	0	0	74	3
Kashiwa Reysol	2015	J1 League	3	0	1	0	2	0	1 (Note: Appearances in AFC Champions League)	0	7	0
Kashiwa Reysol	2016	J1 League	1	0	0	0	1	0	0	0	2	0
Kashiwa Reysol	2017	J1 League	1	0	1	0	5	0	0	0	7	0
Kashiwa Reysol	2018	J1 League	0	0	2	0	0	0	2	0	4	0
Kashiwa Reysol	Total		5	0	4	0	8	0	3	0	20	0
Matsumoto Yamaga	2018	J2 League	7	0	0	0	0	0	–		7	0
Matsumoto Yamaga	2019	J1 League	18	0	1	0	2	0	–		21	0
Matsumoto Yamaga	Total		25	0	1	0	2	0	0	0	28	0
Western United FC	2019–20	A-League	12	0	0	0	–		–		12	0
Western United FC	2020–21	A-League	26	1	0	0	–		–		26	1
Western United FC	2021–22	A-League Men	27	0	2	0	–		–		29	0
Western United FC	2022–23	A-League Men	19	0	3	0	–		–		22	0
Western United FC	2023–24	A-League Men	24	0	0	0	–		–		24	0
Western United FC	2024–25	A-League Men	27	0	1	0	–		–		28	0
Western United FC	Total		135	1	6	0	0	0	0	0	141	1
Machida Zelvia	2025	J1 League	0	0	0	0	–		0	0	0	0
Machida Zelvia	2026	J1 (100)	0	0	–		–		0	0	0	0
Machida Zelvia	Total		0	0	0	0	0	0	0	0	0	0
Career total			223	3	16	1	21	0	3	0	263	4
