= Noah Botić =

Australian soccer player (born 2002)

Personal information
- Full name: Noah Vinko Botić
- Date of birth: 11 January 2002 (age 24)
- Place of birth: Sydney, New South Wales, Australia
- Height: 1.83 m (6 ft 0 in)
- Position: Striker

Team information
- Current team: Austria Wien
- Number: 9

Youth career
- Hurstville Zagreb
- St George
- Football NSW Institute
- 2016: Western Sydney Wanderers
- 2017: Sydney Olympic
- 2018–2019: Rockdale City Suns
- 2019–2021: Hoffenheim

Senior career*
Years	Team	Apps	(Gls)
2018–2019	Rockdale City Suns	2	(0)
2021–2025	Western United	72	(27)
2025–	Austria Wien	13	(3)

International career^{‡}
2018–2019	Australia U17	10	(10)
2023–2024	Australia U23	10	(6)
- * Club domestic league appearances and goals as of 16 January 2026 ‡ National team caps and goals as of 30 August 2025

Noah Vinko Botić (Croatian: [ʋinko botiɕ] vin-KOH bot-ITCH; born 11 January 2002) is an Australian soccer player who plays as a striker for Austria Wien in the Austrian Bundesliga and the Australia national team.

== Club career ==
=== Early career ===
Botić was born in Sydney, Australia, and played for numerous different clubs in Australia at youth level.

=== Hoffenheim ===
Following trials with English sides Manchester United, as well as interest from Everton and German champions Bayern Munich, Botić signed a two-year scholarship deal with Hoffenheim in 2019.

In October 2019, he was named among the 60 best young talents in the world by English newspaper The Guardian.

Due to his potential, Botić has been tipped to be Australia's successor to clinical striker Mark Viduka, who captained Australia to their best finish at a World Cup, as well as being the top-scoring Australian in the UEFA Champions League.

=== Western United ===
On 1 August 2021, Botić returned to Australia to sign for Western United.

On 9 May 2025, Botić scored Western United's first ever A-League Men finals goal at Ironbark Fields, and became the first A-League Men player to score a hat-trick at the ground, scoring in the 20th, 31st and 62nd minutes in an eventual 3-2 elimination final win over Adelaide United FC.

On 24 May 2025, Botić became Western United’s all-time top goal scorer with 28 goals in all competitions.

=== Austria Wien ===
On 28 June 2025, Botić moved to Europe for the first time by joining Austrian Bundesliga side Austria Wien on a free transfer, signing a three-year contract.

== International career ==
Botić has represented Australia at under-16 and under-17 level. He was joint-top scorer at the 2018 AFC U-16 Championship with five goals from five games, as Australia went out to Japan at the semi-final stage. He followed this up with four goals in four games at the 2019 FIFA U-17 World Cup in Brazil. He also scored in a friendly against England under-17s.

For his performances at youth level, Botić received the inaugural Dylan Tombides medal, awarded to the best Australian soccer player from under-17 to under-23 level, in 2019. In June 2023, he took part in the Maurice Revello Tournament in France with Saudi Arabia.

== Personal life ==
Born in Australia, Botić is of Croatian descent and holds dual-citizenship. He is the cousin of Australian international soccer player Tomi Juric and his brother, Deni.

== Career statistics ==
=== Club ===
As of 9 May 2025

Appearances and goals by club, season and competition
Club	Season	League			Cup		Other		Total	
Club	Season	Division	Apps	Goals	Apps	Goals	Apps	Goals	Apps	Goals
Rockdale City Suns	2018	NPL NSW 1	1	0	0	0	0	0	1	0
Rockdale City Suns	2019	NPL NSW 1	1	0	0	0	0	0	1	0
Rockdale City Suns	Total		2	0	0	0	0	0	2	0
Western United	2021–22	A-League Men	3	0	2	0	0	0	5	0
Western United	2022–23	A-League Men	21	6	2	1	0	0	23	7
Western United	2023–24	A-League Men	19	5	0	0	0	0	19	5
Western United	2024–25	A-League Men	5	0	0	0	0	0	5	0
Western United	Total		48	11	4	1	0	0	52	12
Western United NPL	2022	NPL Victoria 3	3	2	0	0	0	0	3	2
Career total			53	13	4	1	0	0	57	14
