= Wyndham City Stadium =

Proposed soccer stadium in Tarneit, Victoria, Australia

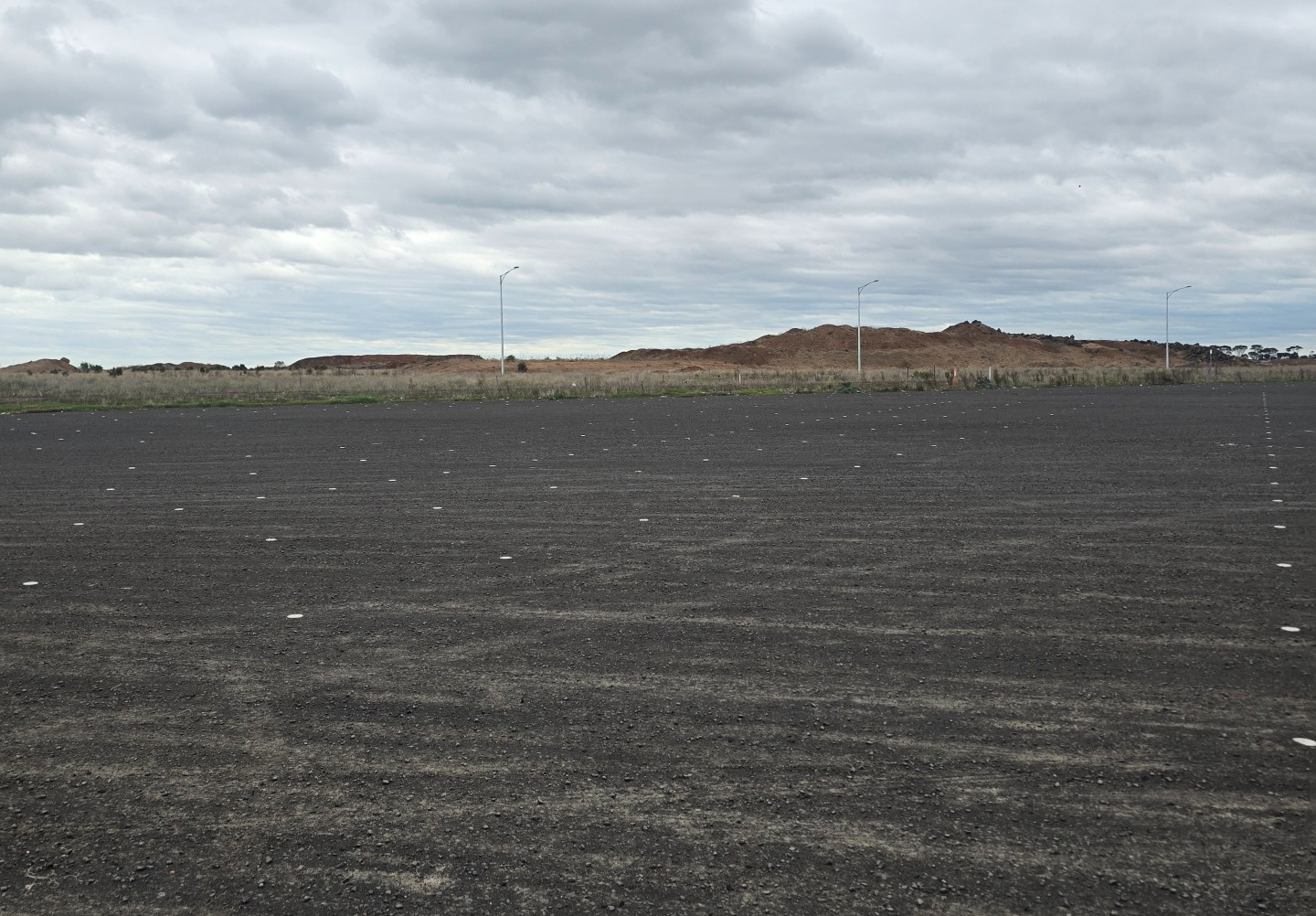
- Site of the stadium in June 2026
- Interactive map of Wyndham City Stadium
- Address: Tarneit, Victoria
- Coordinates: 37°49′43″S 144°37′39″E
- Owner: Western United FC
- Capacity: 15,000
- Type: Soccer-specific stadium

Construction
- Groundbreaking: October 2021
- Opened: unknown (scheduled)

Tenant
- Western United FC

Wyndham City Stadium was a proposed soccer stadium located in the Melbourne suburb of Tarneit. It was scheduled to open in 2026 as the home of Western United FC in the A-Leagues, but major construction never commenced, with the former club playing at the adjacent Ironbark Fields facility instead.

== History ==
As part of its successful bid to enter the A-League in 2019, Western United FC committed to build a 15,000 seat soccer-specific stadium in Tarneit to the west of Melbourne. It will be the first major venue in Australia to be exclusively owned and operated by an A-League club, being funded through value capture.

A training facility will be built adjacent to the new stadium. Early works on the site commenced in October 2021. It is scheduled for completion in 2024.

On 29 May 2022, Western United chief executive Chris Pehlivanis revealed the current timeline for the stadium is for it to be ready in time for the 2025–26 A-League season. Pehlivanis also confirmed that Western United would begin to play home games at their training base from the 2023–24 A-League season, once the 5,000 seat training facility is built, before moving to the completed main stadium two years later.

Wyndham City Council will hold naming rights for the stadium for a 22-year term in a deal valued at $10.4 million.

An update on the stadium timeline was given in January 2024. Western United chairman Jason Sourasis stated that construction should begin mid-to-late 2024, with completion in time for the 2026-27 A League season.

On 23 June 2026, the Western Melbourne Group informed Wyndham City Council that it cannot deliver the Wyndham Stadium Precinct as planned and proposed alternative plans for the precinct. According to Wyndham City Council Corporate Services Director Mark Rossiter, a proposal to negotiate a change to the terms of the development agreement between the council and the Western Melbourne Group was considered and rejected by the council.

On 10 August 2026, the Australian Professional Leagues terminated Western United's Club Participation Agreement, bringing the club's A-League era to an end. A day later, Wyndham City Council terminated its Development Agreement with Western Melbourne Group for the Wyndham Stadium Precinct, effectively discontinuing the project. The Council asserted that all land in the precinct, including Ironbark Fields, remains in its ownership.

== Ironbark Fields ==
Ironbark Fields
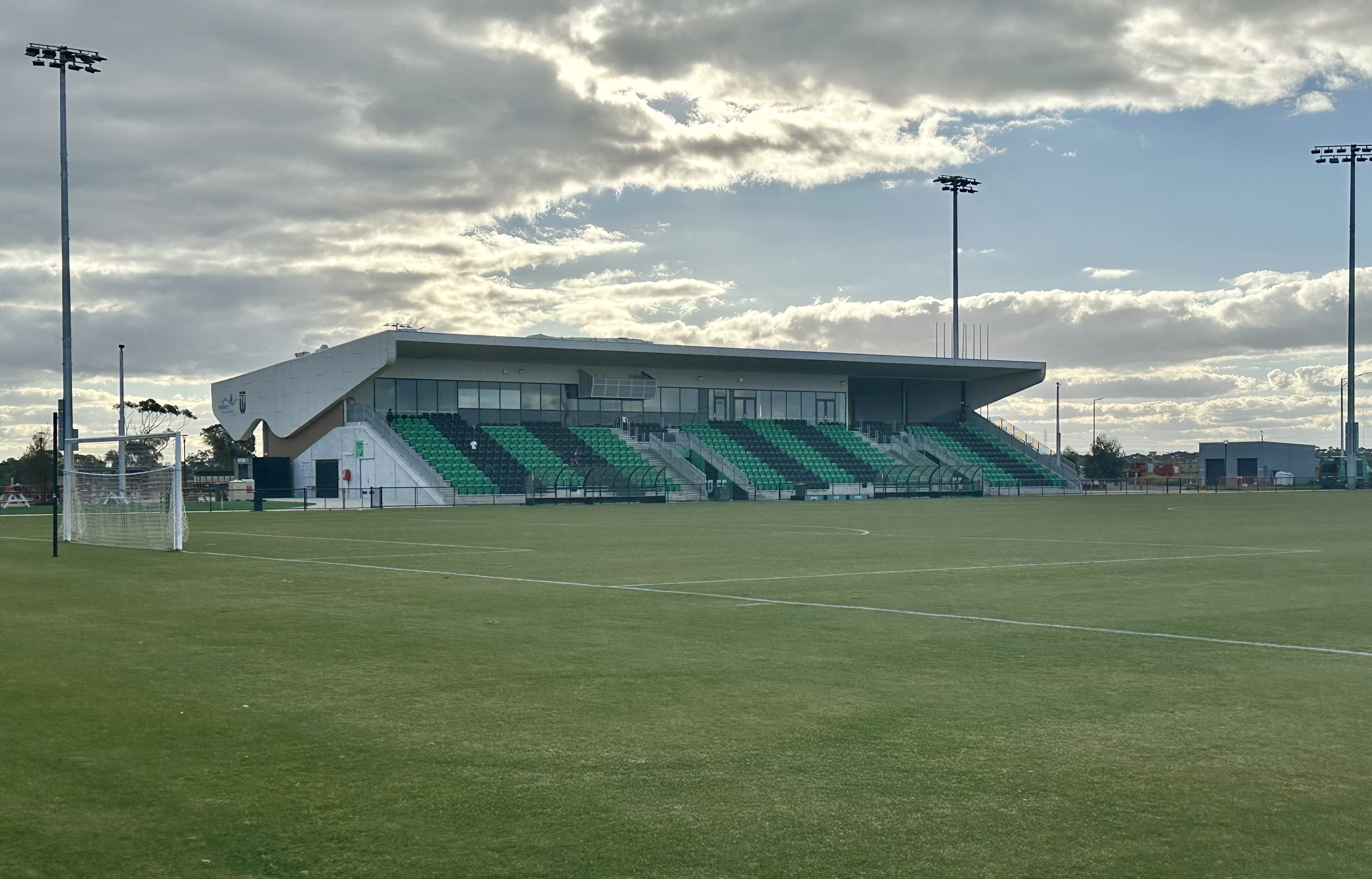
- Ironbark Fields in July 2026
- Interactive map of Ironbark Fields
- Address: 1275 Leakes Road; Tarneit, Victoria
- Owner: City of Wyndham
- Capacity: 5,000 (2,800 seated)
- Record attendance: 4,207 (Western United vs Western Sydney Wanderers, 27 October 2024)

Construction
- Groundbreaking: October 2021
- Opened: 2024

Tenants
- Western United (ALM) (2024–2025); Western United (ALW) (2024–2025); Western United (VPL) (2025–2026)

Ironbark Fields (formerly known as the Wyndham Regional Football Facility) is a rectangular soccer facility in Tarneit in Melbourne's west. The facility, located adjacent to the proposed Wyndham City Stadium, has a spectator capacity of up to 5,000.

The facility primarily serves as the training base for A-League club Western United. The club also plays home games at this venue until its new stadium opens, also hosting Women's, NPL and academy teams. The facility was being jointly funded and developed by Wyndham City Council and the Western Melbourne Group with shared community facilities.

The facility features three training pitches (two turf and one synthetic), a main training pitch with professional-grade surface with capacity for 5,000 spectators, including a grandstand, a pavilion with training and gym facilities, function and media spaces, change rooms, staff facilities, kiosks, public toilets and first aid room.

Western United started playing home games at their training base since the end of the 2023–24 A-League season, and will move to the completed main stadium two years later. The Club assured fans that they were "working tirelessly" behind the scenes to enable as many home matches as possible to be played at Wyndham during the season.

In December 2023, the Wyndham City Council launched a poll to determine an official name for the facility. The options presented were Davis Park or Ironbark Fields. The final name was officially adopted in May 2024.

On 13 February 2024, it was announced that the facility would host the A-League Women match between Western United and Newcastle Jets on 17 March 2024, with Victoria Premier League 1 and A-League Men matches to follow.

The facility hosted its inaugural professional soccer match on 17 March 2024, when Western United hosted the Newcastle Jets in an A-League Women fixture. In front of a crowd of 2,040, the Newcastle Jets won 3-1, with Libby Copus-Brown scoring the first professional goal at the ground in the match's 4th minute, while Aimee Medwin scored Western United's first goal at the ground in the match's 20th minute.

The facility hosted its inaugural A-League Men match on 6 April 2024, when Western United FC hosted Macarthur FC. In front of a crowd of 3,430, Western United won 4-2, with Valère Germain scoring the first A-League Men goal at the ground with a 17th minute penalty, while Riku Danzaki scored Western United's first goal at the ground in the match's 52nd minute. In the same match, Michael Ruhs scored a brace with goals in the 56th and 66th minutes of the match, becoming the first A-League Men player to score multiple goals in the same match at the ground.

The facility hosted its inaugural professional soccer finals match on 13 April 2024, when Western United hosted the Newcastle Jets in a 2024 A-League Women finals series elimination final. In front of a crowd of 3,370, the Newcastle Jets won the match 4-2 after extra time, with Sarina Bolden scoring the first professional finals goal at the ground in the match's 4th minute, while Alana Cerne scored Western United's first finals goal at the ground in the match's 22nd minute.

The facility hosted its inaugural men's professional soccer finals match on 9 May 2025, when Western United FC hosted Adelaide United FC in a 2025 A-League Men finals series elimination final. In front of a crowd of 3,078, Western United won the match 3-2, with Luka Jovanovic scoring the first professional A-League Men finals goal at the ground in the match's 3rd minute, while Noah Botic scored Western United's first A-League Men's finals goal at the ground in the match's 20th minute, with Botic adding further goals in the 31st and 62nd minutes to become the first A-League Men player to score a hat-trick at the ground.
