= Western United FC =

Australian soccer club

Western United
- Full name: Western United Football Club
- Founded: 13 December 2018; 7 years ago as Western Melbourne
- Dissolved: 2026
- Ground: Ironbark Fields
- Capacity: 5,000
- Owner(s): Western Melbourne Group, Sayers Road Investment Co, Jaszac Investments – Jason Sourasis, Theodore Andriopoulos, Steve Horvat, Levent Shevki and John Tripodi
- Chairman: Jason Sourasis
- Website: wufc.com.au
Home colours	Away colours

Western United Football Club was an Australian soccer club. The club was based in the western Melbourne suburb of Tarneit; the club represented western Victoria, incorporating the western suburbs of Melbourne; the regional cities of Ballarat, and Geelong; and regional and country towns in western Victoria.

The club was established as part of an expansion process of the A-League, the country's premier soccer competition. It began playing in the 2019–20 A-League season, under licence from Football Australia (FA). On 12 May 2022 it announced the establishment of an A-League Women team.

United played its home matches at Ironbark Fields in Wyndham. The club previously played home matches at GMHBA Stadium in Geelong, University of Tasmania Stadium in Launceston, North Hobart Oval in Hobart, AAMI Park in Melbourne and Mars Stadium in Ballarat, with the club planning to permanently relocate matches to Wyndham City Stadium, a soccer-specific stadium in Wyndham upon its construction.

The club lost their licence to compete in the 2025–26 season, with the possibility of returning at a later date. On 10 August 2026, the Australian Professional Leagues had announced that it had terminated the club's A-Leagues Men and Womens' licenses. Two days later, Football Victoria withdrew the club from all state based competitions following the Federal Court's decision to order the club's owners to be wound up in insolvency, resulting in the club becoming defunct.

== History ==
=== Origins and early success (2018–2024) ===
In August 2018, the Western Melbourne Group was one of the eight teams that the FFA had accepted in the official bidding phase, as part of the new expansion process. Four months later, the bid's success was announced, along with the bid from Macarthur FC. Western Melbourne played home games at Kardinia Park in Geelong for its first two seasons, while building its stadium and training centre in Tarneit, with completion expected in 2021.

On 11 January 2019, Western Melbourne Group announced John Anastasiadis as senior assistant coach for the club's debut season. On 24 January 2019, the consortium announced that John Hutchinson would also join the club as an assistant coach.

On 31 January 2019, Western Melbourne made its first player and marquee signing Panagiotis Kone ahead of its inaugural season. On 12 February 2019, Socceroos defender Josh Risdon became Western Melbourne's first Australian signing.

On 13 February 2019, it was announced that the club would be called Western United Football Club after a public vote was held through the Herald Sun newspaper. The club's colours of green and black were also chosen via the same public vote.

In May 2019, Western United announced partnership with sports brand Kappa. Two months later, the club unveiled their inaugural jerseys for their first season in the A-League, featuring green and black stripes.

On 2 June 2019, the Director of Football for Western United, Steve Horvat presented Geelong representative players with their kits for the 2019 Country Championships. Horvat additionally announced the club would set up a Geelong-based academy by 2021.

On 28 May 2022, they became A-League champions, defeating defending champions Melbourne City in the 2022 A-League Men Grand Final. Their Grand Final win saw Western United became just the second expansion side to win the A-League Championship, the quickest expansion side to win the championship, the first team to triumph in their first grand final appearance since Brisbane Roar in 2011, and one of just two teams to have won the championship after finishing outside the top two, Melbourne Victory having first achieved that feat in 2018.

The 2022–23 A-League season saw Western United become the first A-League champion in six years to fail to qualify for the A-League finals in the next year. They finished the season in seventh place on 32 points, with a final tally of 9 wins,5 draws and 12 losses.

In October 2023, it was announced that Western United had been given approval from the Wyndham City Council to play home A-Leagues matches at their training ground, the Wyndham Regional Football Facility, in the 2023–24 A-League season, with the venue to serve as Western United's temporary home stadium until the Wyndham City Stadium was completed.

The 2023–24 A-League season started promisingly for Western United, with the club recording a 2–1 win over Melbourne City at AAMI Park. However, that was followed by a run of six consecutive losses, the losing run halted with a 2–1 win over Brisbane Roar. Western United eventually finished the season in 11th place, their worst league finish to date, ensuring that the club missed finals for the second straight season.

=== Ownership challenges and financial uncertainty ===
==== Debts and wind-up ====
On 1 May 2025, it was reported that the club was subject to a player registration ban by FIFA, effective until the January 2027 transfer window. Media reports indicated that this was due to a dispute with former player Aleksandar Prijovic.

On 2 May, the club's owners announced that KAM Melbourne would acquire a majority stake in the club, subject to the approval of Australian Professional Leagues and Football Australia. Later that month the club was served with breach notices by both their men's and women's teams over unpaid wages. It was reported on 2 August that the club lost $11 million in the 2023/24 financial year, with liabilities exceeding assets by more than $55 million, and a deficit of more than $12m for the preceding period. By this point the proposed KAM Melbourne takeover had not eventuated and then they formally pulled out on 27 August.

On 29 August, the club's parent company WMG Football Club Limited was placed in liquidation, after a Federal Court order. However, the club attempted to argue that it found "a fresh $15 million investment to pay off their debts" and simply needed an adjournment to resolve the situation.

In April 2026, it was announced that a new wind-up action was served on Western Melbourne Group, with a hearing scheduled for June 2026.

==== Suspension of license ====
On 8 August 2025, the First Instance Board of Football Australia determined that Western United had failed to meet the criteria to hold an A-Leagues license. The renewal of the club's license was rescinded, with the club subsequently ejected from both Australian Professional Leagues (APL) competitions – the A-League Men and the A-League Women. Appeal by the club followed, The APL in the meantime restructured the schedules for the 2025–26 A-League men's and women's seasons to exclude Western United, with the expectation that they will be omitted before mid-September. On 2 September, Football Australia's Appeals and Entry Control Body (A&ECB) adjourned its decision on the matter of Western United's licence until 9 September.

On 6 September 2025, the club, APL, Football Australia, Professional Footballers Australia (PFA) and Wyndham City Council agreed a resolution of United sitting out the 2025–26 seasons, with the stipulation that all players will be released from their contracts, irrespective of the outcomes of any appellations. The club maintained the commitment to return to the competitions after a year on hiatus. The decision received harsh criticism from the PFA president Beau Busch, who described it as a "let down [of players] by governance failures and false promises".

On 10 September 2025, the A&ECB determined that the club's appeal had to go to a new hearing, and in the interim the previous licence withdrawal has been set aside.

On 19 May 2026, Football Australia announced that Western United did not satisfy the mandatory licensing criteria for the upcoming 2026–27 season.

On 10 August 2026, the Australian Professional Leagues had announced that it had terminated the club's A-Leagues Men and Womens' licenses. Two days later, Football Victoria withdrew the club from all state based competitions following the Federal Court's decision to order the club's owners to be wound up in insolvency. Two days later on 12 August, Football Victoria would announce that Western United's Youth and junior teams would be withdrawn from FV competitions including the Victoria Premier League 1.

== A-League Women ==
Western United joined the A-League Women for the 2022–23 season, which, with the return of Central Coast Mariners, expanded the league to 12 teams.

== Crest ==
Western United unveiled its official crest in May 2019, which features a stylised 'W' symbol. The club commented that the design was influenced by the pitch of roofs in the suburbs and the West Gate Bridge, with the signature green colour representing growth, harmony and freshness.

== Colours ==
On 13 February 2019, the club revealed that its primary colours will be green and black.

On 18 June 2019, through consulting with Kappa and fans, the club officially unveiled its inaugural home and alternative kits for the 2019–20 A-League season. The home kit consists of green and black vertical stripes where the Western United logo is encased in a faint crest. The alternative kit takes a different approach with a geometric design with varying sized green and black triangles connecting each other through their points. The club's logo is also contained at the bottom of the kit. This design is said to reflect on the club's modern approach in the club's branding.

== Sponsors ==
On 20 May 2019, Western United announced a partnership with Italian sports brand Kappa, which will be the club's inaugural official apparel partner.

Western United announced Probuild as its inaugural sponsor on 3 July 2019 where its logo will be present on the front of its playing kits as well as other apparel.

== Ownership ==
It was revealed in February 2019 that Birmingham Sports Holdings had initially funded the bid's license fee. They later pulled out of the project due to a downturn in the Australian housing market, that devalued the intended housing developments to be built in the same area as the proposed new stadium in Tarneit.

== Affiliated clubs ==
- (Singapore) Balestier Khalsa (2024–2025)

On 28 August 2024, Western United signed a Memorandum of Understanding (MOU) with Singapore Premier League club Balestier Khalsa.

- (Sweden) IFK Norrköping (2025–)

The supporters of the two clubs have been aligned since mid 2025, and the fans regularly make contact with each other online.

== Stadium ==
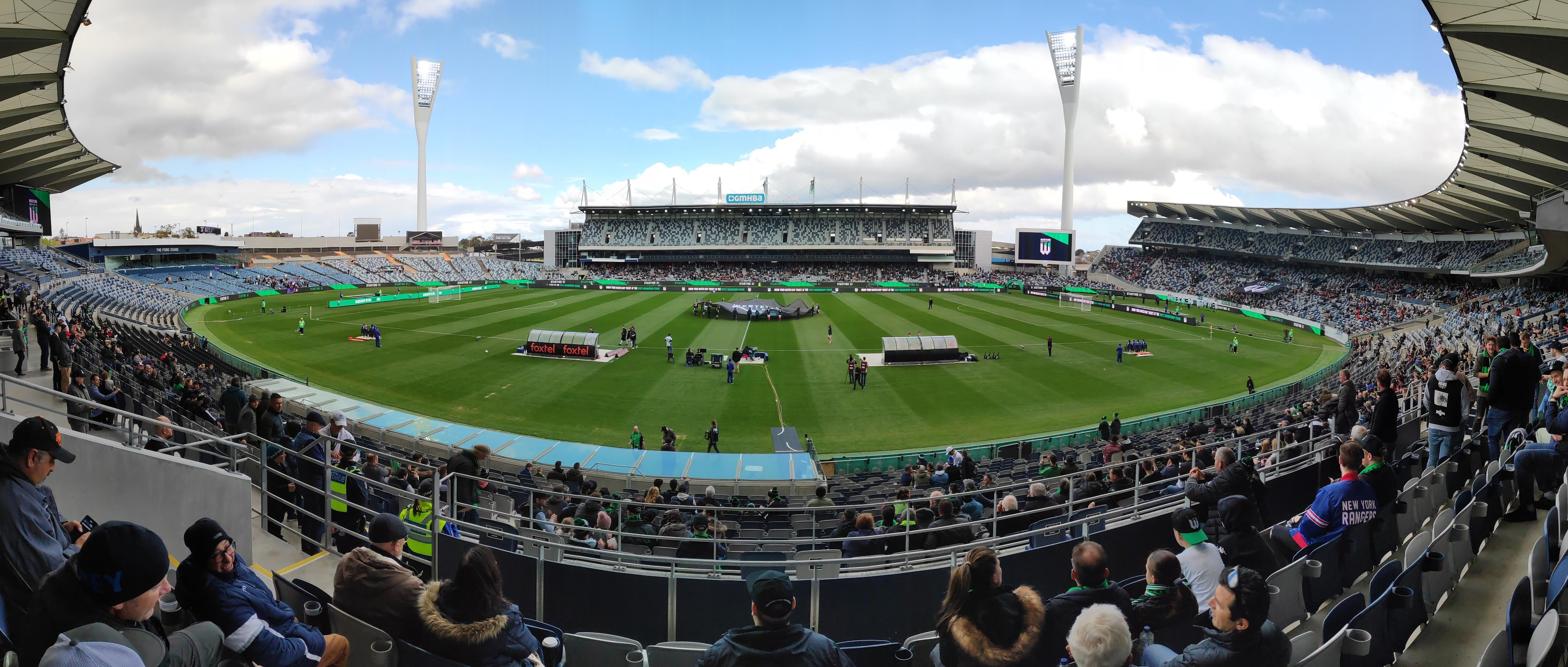
Western United FC's debut home match at Kardinia Park, against Perth Glory, 19 October 2019

During their final two seasons, Western United played their home matches at Ironbark Fields, a 5,000 capacity venue in the Wyndham. The stadium was to be a temporary home while the Wyndham City Stadium was to be built in the adjacent precinct. Western United had a somewhat transient existence between 2019 and 2023, playing in a range of stadiums across Victoria and Tasmania. However, in early 2024, the club played its first game at its purpose built facility in Wyndham, ending the club's nomadic era.

Western United's training facilities in Tarneit were on a 60-hectare (150-acre) site, with a two-story building featuring a range of training and gym facilities, function and media spaces, change rooms and staff facilities, kiosks, public toilets and a first aid room, as well as three full-sized pitches, including the aforementioned 5,000 capacity stadium which was capable of hosting A-League matches. The three pitches consisted of a main grass pitch, which served as the main training base for Western United's A-Leagues teams and girls and boys academy teams and was suitable for A-League Women's and NPL standard matches. A second grass pitch was designed for community-level competitive games and as a training pitch while a third synthetic pitch was used for training and matches.

Upon their entrance to the A-League, Western United initially used the City Vista Recreation Reserve, the home ground of Caroline Springs George Cross FC as their training base. In October 2021 the club then moved its senior men's team and administration staff to The Hangar in Tullamarine, an Australian rules football facility that is home to the Essendon Football Club and Paralympics Australia. Construction on the training facilities in Tarneit commenced in March 2022 and were completed by March 2024.

Western United Stadium History
Location	Stadium	Capacity	Year
Geelong	Kardinia Park	36,000	2019–2021
Ballarat	Eureka Stadium	11,000	2019–2024
Melbourne	Whitten Oval	10,000	2020
Melbourne	Melbourne Rectangular Stadium	30,050	2020–2024
Launceston	York Park	19,000	2021–2023
Ballarat	Morshead Park Stadium	8,500	2022
Hobart	North Hobart Oval	10,000	2023–2024
Wyndham	Ironbark Fields	5,000	2024–2025

=== Wyndham City Stadium ===
The club had proposed building a 15,000 seated stadium in Tarneit, Victoria. The stadium was set to be the first major venue in the country to be exclusively owned and operated by an A-League club. The proposal, which was to be funded entirely privately, had received planning approval from the Victorian Government, and the club had stated it expected construction to commence in mid-2024 with a view to completion by mid-2026.

On 6 December 2019, Western United announced that site investigations had been completed and that construction was expected to commence in mid-2020. On 18 September 2020, Western United announced that a training facility would be built adjacent to the new stadium development. The training facility was planned to have two grass and one artificial soccer pitch, along with seating for 5,000 spectators. The main grass pitch, with the 5,000 seat stand was to be used as the training base by Western United, while the other two pitches would have shared community use. The press release also revealed that the club has completed all of the site investigations required to develop a concept masterplan for the proposed new stadium and that planning submission has been submitted to the Department of Environment, Land, Water and Planning (DELWP) for approval. The release also stated that construction on the new precinct would commence in early 2021, to be completed by early 2023. On 22 September 2021 Western Melbourne Group, the club's parent company, announced that "in the week commencing 25 October 2021, early works on the site at Leakes Road, Tarneit will commence" which would create access roads to the construction site. The announcement also advised that planning approval for the stadium had not yet been received and that timelines for completion had been refreshed in light of the COVID-19 pandemic. As of May 2022, construction on the Wyndham City Stadium was yet to commence, with Western United chairman Jason Sourasis admitting that the club were "naive" to declare they would be able to build a new stadium within two years of their inception. The stadium was then anticipated to become operational in 2026. The club then planned to play matches at the Wyndham Regional Football Facility in 2024; a small training stadium with a capacity of approximately 5,000 spectators located within the same precinct of the proposed Wyndham City Stadium.

A further update on the construction timeline was given in January 2024. Western United chairman Jason Sourasis stated that construction should begin mid-to-late 2024, with completion in time for the 2026–27 A League season.

On 13 February 2024, it was announced that the Wyndham Regional Football Facility would host the A-League Women match between Western United FC and Newcastle Jets FC on 17 March 2024, with Victoria Premier League 1 and A-League Men matches to follow.

== Supporters and rivalries ==
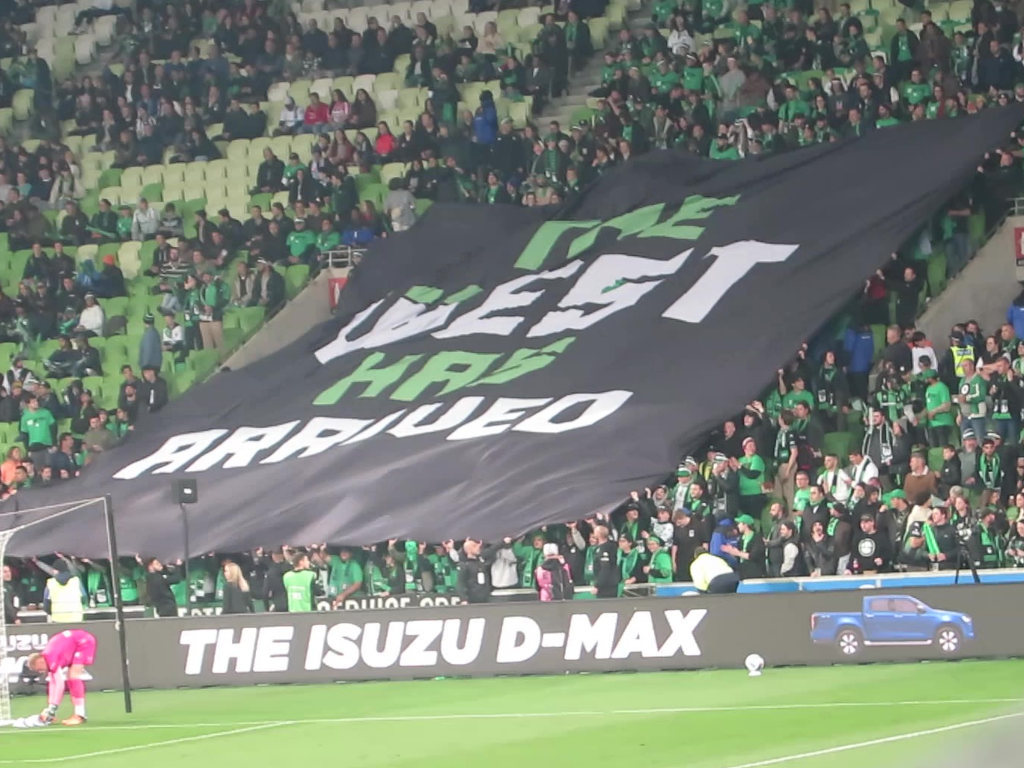
Western United fans holding up a banner reading "The West Has Arrived" at the 2022 A-League Men Grand Final

Western United's fanbase are referred to as the "Western Service Crew". The fanbase started in less than a year since the club's foundation which grew to 2,800 members on the Western Service Crew's Facebook page in support of Western United. Throughout the 2020–21 season however, Western United struggled with crowd numbers. This caused them to have the lowest attendance in A-League Men history with 990 people attending a match between Western United and the Newcastle Jets on 26 April 2021. At the end of the 2020–21 A-League season, Western United's total home attendance reduced by an aggregate of 26,000 people compared to the prior season. A month after the season end, an opinioned report was made in "The Roar" newspaper of Western United's "embarrassing stadium fiasco". This contained evidence of the club losing supporters due to playing in different home stadiums like Mars Stadium and Whitten Oval.

Ever since joining the A-League, Western United have consistently suffered from low attendances: the club had the second-lowest average attendance out of all clubs in the 2019–20 and 2021–22 seasons, and had the lowest average attendance of all clubs in the 2020–21, 2022–23, 2023–24 and 2024–25 seasons. Despite entering the 2022–23 season as the reigning champions, Western United were one of just two teams which recorded a decrease in their average attendance compared to the previous season; their average attendance for the 2022–23 season was 3,168, compared to their 2021–22 season average of 3,351.

=== Rivalries ===
- Melbourne Victory (The Westgate Derby / The Battle of the Bridge) – Upon joining the A-League in the 2019–20 season as the third club in Melbourne, Western United has developed a rivalry with Melbourne Victory. Despite the rivalry's short existence, it has garnered a reputation for producing talking points, controversy, tension, goals and drama. In the team's first meeting, in November 2019 at Marvel Stadium, Western United won 3–2 despite going 2–0 down within the first 7 minutes. In February 2021 at Marvel Stadium, despite conceding the first goal of the match and despite being reduced to 10 men for the final half-hour of the match, Western United won 4–3, with Victor Sanchez scoring in the final minute of stoppage time. After keeping the Victory winless for the first 5 matches of the rivalry (4 wins, 1 draw), Melbourne Victory ended their losing run in emphatic fashion on 28 May 2021, beating Western United 6–1 at AAMI Park. Currently six former Victory players have played for Western United (four have played for the Victory senior team, two have represented the Victory's youth or NPL teams without making an appearance for the senior team).

== Statistics and records ==
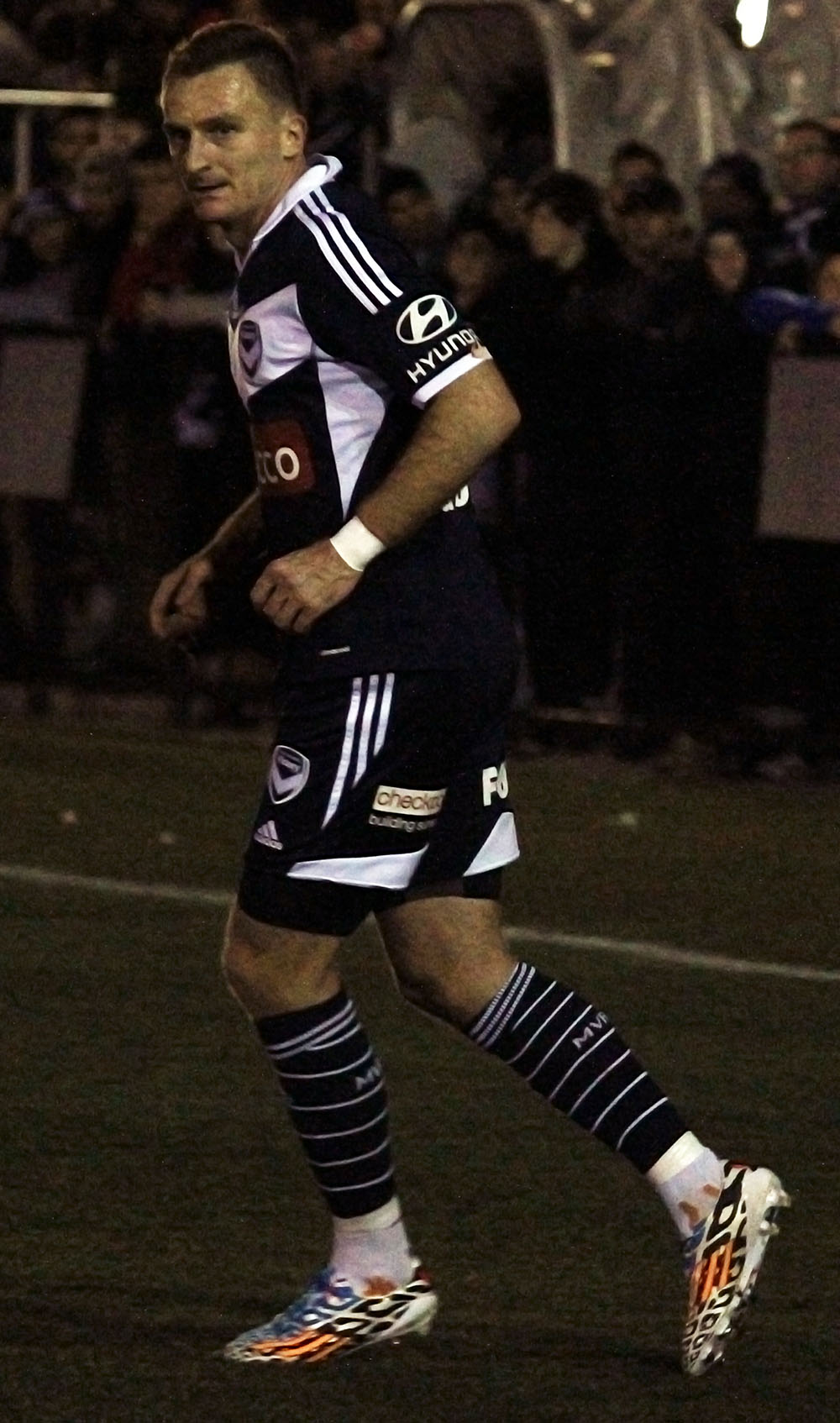
Besart Berisha is Western United's second highest goalscorer, with 26 goals in all competitions.

Tomoki Imai holds the record for most Western United appearances, having played 142 first-team matches. Lachlan Wales is second, having played 113 times. The most appearances for a goalkeeper is Jamie Young who played 59 times.

Noah Botic is the club's top goal scorer with 28 goals in all competitions.

Western United's record home attendance is 10,128, for an A-League Men match against Melbourne Victory on 8 December 2019 at GMHBA Stadium.

== Season by season record ==
Chart of yearly table positions for Western United in A-League Men

Season	A-League Men										Australia Cup	Top scorer	
Season	P	W	D	L	F	A	GD	Pts	Pos	Finals	Australia Cup	Name	Goals
2019–20	26	12	3	11	46	37	+9	39	5th	SF	–	(Kosovo) Besart Berisha	19
2020–21	26	8	4	14	30	47	–17	28	10th	–	–	(Kosovo) Besart Berisha	7
2021–22	26	13	6	7	40	30	+10	45	3rd	W	R32	(Serbia) Aleksandar Prijović	15
2022–23	26	9	5	12	34	47	–13	32	7th	–	R16	(Australia) Noah Botic	6
2023–24	27	7	5	15	36	55	–19	26	11th	–	QF	(Brazil) Daniel Penha	7
2024–25	26	14	5	7	55	37	+18	47	3rd	SF	PO	(Australia) Noah Botic	16
2025–26	did not participate										R32	—	
2026–27	did not participate										did not participate	—	

Key

- PO – Playoff
- GS – Group stage
- R32 – Round of 32
- R16 – Round of 16
- QF – Quarter-finals
- SF – Semi-finals
- W – Winners

== Players ==
=== First team squad ===
Following the hibernation of the club's participation in the A-League Men ahead of the 2025–26 season, all senior players were released from their contracts. Therefore, the player list below represents the squad at the time of withdrawal of the club's licence.

As of 19 August 2025

Note: Flags indicate national team as defined under FIFA eligibility rules; some limited exceptions apply. Players may hold more than one non-FIFA nationality.

No.	Pos.	Nation	Player
5	FW	AUS	Oliver Lavale (scholarship)
6	DF	JPN	Tomoki Imai (vice-captain)
9	FW	JPN	Hiroshi Ibusuki
10	MF	AUS	Matthew Grimaldi
13	DF	AUS	Tate Russell
14	FW	AUS	Jake Najdovski
17	DF	AUS	Ben Garuccio (captain)
20	FW	AUS	Abel Walatee (scholarship)
21	MF	AUS	Sebastian Pasquali
23	MF	AUS	Rhys Bozinovski
29	DF	IRQ	Charbel Shamoon (scholarship)

No.	Pos.	Nation	Player
30	DF	AUS	Dylan Leonard (scholarship)
33	GK	AUS	Matt Sutton
34	MF	AUS	James York (scholarship)
35	GK	AUS	Alex Nassiep (scholarship)
37	FW	IDN	Luke Vickery (scholarship)
41	DF	AUS	Besian Kutleshi (scholarship)
43	DF	LBN	Khoder Kaddour (scholarship)
44	MF	AUS	Jordan Lauton
47	DF	NZL	Luka Coveny (scholarship)
70	GK	AUS	Michael Vonja

=== Youth ===
Players to have been featured in a first-team matchday squad for Western United.

Note: Flags indicate national team as defined under FIFA eligibility rules; some limited exceptions apply. Players may hold more than one non-FIFA nationality.

No.	Pos.	Nation	Player
48	FW	AUS	Mark Leonard
54	FW	AUS	Tobias Servin

== Coaching staff ==
Football Department

Position	Name	Ref.
General Manager of Football	Vacant	
Head Coach	Vacant	
Senior Assistant Coach	Vacant	
Assistant and Development Coach	Vacant	
Goalkeeping Coach	Vacant	
Performance Analyst	Vacant	
Video Analyst	Vacant	
Head of High Performance (Consultant)	Vacant	
Lead Physiotherapist	Vacant	
Rehabilitation and Lead Academy Physiotherapist	Vacant	
Conditioning Coach	Vacant	
Strength Coach	Vacant	
Team Doctor	Vacant	
Football Operations Manager	Vacant	
Team Manager	Vacant	

== Club captains ==
Dates	Name	Notes	Honours (as captain)
2019–2023	(Italy) Alessandro Diamanti	Inaugural club captain	2021–22 A-League Men Championship
2023–2024	(Australia) Josh Risdon		
2024–2025	(Australia) Ben Garuccio		

== See also ==
- Expansion of the A-League
- Western United FC (women)
- Western United FC Youth

== Honours ==
- A-League Men Championship
  - Winners (1): 2022
