= Western United FC Youth =

Western United soccer youth system

Western United Youth
- Full name: Western United Football Club Youth
- Founded: 8 December 2020; 5 years ago
- Dissolved: 11 August 2026; 21 days ago
- Ground: Ironbark Fields
- Capacity: 5,000
- Chairman: Jason Sourasis
- Coach: Turgut Fanoscu
- League: Victoria Premier League 1
- 2026: Withdrew
- Website: www.wufc.com.au
Home colours	Away colours

Western United Football Club Youth was an youth system of Western United Football Club based in Tarneit, Melbourne. The youth team plays in the Victoria Premier League 1, the second level of Victorian soccer. The club also fields under-23s, and five other academy teams within the VPL system.

== History ==
=== Formation ===
The team was founded in 2020, with Ante Moric being announced as the inaugural head coach for the 2021 season. The clubs temporary training base was at City Vista Recreation Reserve at Fraser Rise, Victoria from 2022–2024.

=== Withdrawn ===
Football Victoria (FV) has decided for Western United FC (WUFC) to be withdrawn from all FV competitions include VPL, following the Federal Court’s decision to order WMG Football Club Limited to be wound up in insolvency.

== Youth current squad ==
These players can also play with the senior squad and compete in the Victoria Premier League 1.

As of 23 September 2025

Note: Flags indicate national team as defined under FIFA eligibility rules; some limited exceptions apply. Players may hold more than one non-FIFA nationality.

No.	Pos.	Nation	Player
–	MF	AUS	Jacob Nasso
–		AUS	Lachlan Grundy
–	FW	AUS	Mark Leonard
—	FW	AUS	Nicholas Koek
—		NZL	Harry Casci
–	DF	AUS	Riley Foxe
–		AUS	Yannick Kengni
–	MF	AUS	Anthony Didulica
–	FW	AUS	Victor Muhindo
—	MF	AUS	Christian Polyzoudis
–		AUS	Oscar Tanic
–		AUS	Deng Mayen
—		AUS	Jacob Buchanan
–		AUS	Alex Marmura

No.	Pos.	Nation	Player
–		AUS	Winston Ashburner
–		AUS	Ibrahim Kaddour
–		AUS	Lucas Simao
–		AUS	Mark Reec
–		AUS	Ethan Robinson
–		AUS	Hasani Lumu
–		AUS	Christian Dermentzoglou
–		AUS	Blake Wirth
–		AUS	Jonathon Hassan
–		AUS	Marcus Tavolaro
–		AUS	Emilio Dataro
–		AUS	Abdurahman Omer
–		AUS	Anderson Back
–		AUS	Flynn Slater

== Current staff ==
As of 30 January 2025.

Academy Director	Anthony Frost
Head Coach	Turgut Fanoscu
Assistant Coach	Michael Hombsch

== See also ==
- Western United FC
