= 2026–27 3. Liga =

3. Liga
- Season: 2026–27
- Dates: 7 August 2026 – 22 May 2027
- Matches: 140
- Goals: 463 (3.31 per match)
- Top goalscorer: David Otto (12 goals)
- Biggest home win: Wiesbaden 7–1 Großaspach
- Biggest away win: Meppen 1–6 Saarbrücken; Havelse 1–6 Viktoria Köln
- Highest scoring: Viktoria Köln 5–3 Saarbrücken
- Longest winning run: 4 games Duisburg
- Longest unbeaten run: 7 games Essen
- Longest winless run: 5 games Wiesbaden
- Longest losing run: 3 games Verl
- Attendance: 1,306,781 (9,334 per match)
- All statistics correct as of 22 November 2026.

The 2026–27 3. Liga is the 19th season of the 3. Liga. It started on 7 August 2026 and will conclude on 22 May 2027.

== Teams ==
Locations of the 2026–27 3. Liga teams

=== Team changes ===
Promoted from 2025–26 Regionalliga	Relegated from 2025–26 2. Bundesliga	Promoted to 2026–27 2. Bundesliga	Relegated to 2026–27 Regionalliga
Fortuna Köln; SV Meppen; Sonnenhof Großaspach; Würzburger Kickers	Fortuna Düsseldorf; Preußen Münster	VfL Osnabrück; Energie Cottbus	1860 Munich (Note: 1860 Munich were administratively relegated to the Regionalliga Bayern after failing to obtain a 3. Liga license.); Erzgebirge Aue; SSV Ulm; 1. FC Schweinfurt

=== Stadiums and locations ===
Team	Location	Stadium	Capacity
Alemannia Aachen	Aachen	Tivoli	32,960
MSV Duisburg	Duisburg	Schauinsland-Reisen-Arena	31,514
Fortuna Düsseldorf	Düsseldorf	Merkur Spiel-Arena	54,600
Rot-Weiss Essen	Essen	Stadion an der Hafenstraße	19,962
Sonnenhof Großaspach	Aspach	WIRmachenDRUCK Arena	10,001
TSV Havelse	Hanover	Eilenriedestadion; Heinz von Heiden Arena^{1}	5,001; 49,000
TSG Hoffenheim II	Sinsheim	Dietmar-Hopp-Stadion	6,350
FC Ingolstadt	Ingolstadt	Audi Sportpark	15,200
Fortuna Köln	Cologne	Südstadion	11,748
Viktoria Köln	Cologne	Sportpark Höhenberg	8,343
Waldhof Mannheim	Mannheim	Carl-Benz-Stadion	24,302
SV Meppen	Meppen	Hänsch-Arena	13,241
Preußen Münster	Münster	LVM-Preußenstadion	14,300
Jahn Regensburg	Regensburg	Jahnstadion Regensburg	15,210
Hansa Rostock	Rostock	Ostseestadion	29,000
1. FC Saarbrücken	Saarbrücken	Ludwigsparkstadion	16,003
VfB Stuttgart II	Aspach	WIRmachenDRUCK Arena^{2}	10,001
SC Verl	Verl	Sportclub Arena	5,207
Wehen Wiesbaden	Wiesbaden	BRITA-Arena	15,295
Würzburger Kickers	Würzburg	Akon Arena	13,090

^{1} TSV Havelse is planning to play their home matches at the Eilenriedestadion since their home stadium, the Wilhelm-Langrehr-Stadion in Garbsen, did not meet 3. Liga standards. They would move to the Heinz von Heiden Arena for high-risk matches.
^{2} VfB Stuttgart II will play their home matches at the WIRmachenDRUCK Arena since their home stadium, the Robert-Schlienz-Stadion in Stuttgart, did not meet 3. Liga standards.

=== Personnel and kits ===
Team	Manager	Captain	Kit manufacturer	Shirt sponsor		
Team	Manager	Captain	Kit manufacturer	Front	Sleeve	Back
Alemannia Aachen	(Bosnia and Herzegovina) Mersad Selimbegović	(Germany) Mika Hanraths	Capelli Sport	Universal Polythex	Buxtrade	Stölting Service Group
MSV Duisburg	(Germany) Dietmar Hirsch	(Germany) Rasim Bulić	Adidas	Trinkgut	ZOXS	gesund.de
Fortuna Düsseldorf	(Germany) Jens Langeneke	(Netherlands) Jorrit Hendrix	Adidas	Targobank	Metro Chef	Vodafone
Rot-Weiss Essen	(Germany) Uwe Koschinat	(Germany) Jakob Golz	Jako	RWE	ifm electronic	NEO.bet
Sonnenhof Großaspach	(Germany) Pascal Reinhardt	(Germany) Volkan Celiktas	Nike	Hotel Sonnenhof Aspach	Teinacher	Weitblick Immobilien
TSV Havelse	(Germany) Samir Ferchichi	(Germany) Semi Belkahia	Nike	enercity	None	None
TSG Hoffenheim II	(Germany) Stefan Kleineheismann	(Germany) Valentin Lässig	Macron	syNeo	Volksbank Kraichgau	None
FC Ingolstadt	(Germany) Achim Beierlorzer	(Germany) Simon Lorenz	Erreà	team KRAFT GmbH	Audi Schanzer Fußballschule	SI Electronics
Fortuna Köln	(Germany) Matthias Mink	(Germany) Robin Afamefuna	Robey Sportswear	HIT	format:c	D+P office AG
Viktoria Köln	(Germany) Marian Wilhelm	(Germany) Christoph Greger	Joma	ETL	Wintec Autoglas	Oertel & Prümm
Waldhof Mannheim	(Portugal) Rui Mota	several players (Note: Lukas Klünter, Terrence Boyd, Thijmen Nijhuis and Claudio Kammerknecht will share the captaincy.)	Uhlsport	Stölting Service Group	PLAZA Hotelgroup	Tiptorro
SV Meppen	(Germany) Lucas Beniermann	(Germany) Jonas Fedl	Jako	KiKxxl	Rothkötter	ELA Container
Preußen Münster	(Germany) Thomas Wörle	(Germany) Niko Koulis	Jako	Fiege	Stadtwerke Münster	Gieseke
Jahn Regensburg	(Germany) Sascha Hildmann	(Germany) Felix Strauß	Hummel	Netto Marken-Discount	None	Netto Marken-Discount
Hansa Rostock	(Germany) André Breitenreiter	(Germany) Franz Pfanne	Reebok	SLT Unternehmen	Time Scan	None
1. FC Saarbrücken	(Germany) Argirios Giannikis	(Germany) Florian Pick	Uhlsport	Victor's Group	LOTTO Saartoto	Victor's Group
VfB Stuttgart II	(Germany) Nico Willig	(Germany) Dominik Nothnagel	Jako	Landesbank Baden-Württemberg	Porsche	None
SC Verl	(Kosovo) Orest Shala	(Germany) Niko Kijewski	Joma	Beckhoff	EGE GmbH	None
Wehen Wiesbaden	(Germany) Frank Steinmetz / (Argentina) Giuliano Modica	(Germany) Florian Hübner	Erreà	Brita	R+V Versicherung	A.B.S. Global Factoring
Würzburger Kickers	(Germany) Michael Schiele	(Germany) Daniel Hägele	Jako	Akon	Sparkasse Mainfranken Würzburg	WEGMANN automotive

=== Managerial changes ===
Team	Outgoing	Manner	Exit date		Position in table	Incoming	Incoming date		Ref.
Team	Outgoing	Manner	Announced on	Departed on	Position in table	Incoming	Announced on	Arrived on	Ref.
Preußen Münster	(Germany) Alois Schwartz	Mutual consent	14 May 2026	30 June 2026	Pre-season	(Germany) Thomas Wörle	18 May 2026	1 July 2026	
SC Verl	(Germany) Tobias Strobl	Signed by VfL Wolfsburg	3 June 2026	30 June 2026	Pre-season	(Kosovo) Orest Shala	18 June 2026	1 July 2026	
Waldhof Mannheim	(Luxembourg) Luc Holtz	Signed by Metz	5 June 2026		Pre-season	(Portugal) Rui Mota	18 June 2026	1 July 2026	
Wehen Wiesbaden	(Germany) Daniel Scherning	Sacked	14 September 2026		20th	(Germany) Frank Steinmetz / (Argentina) Giuliano Modica (interim)	14 September 2026		
Hansa Rostock	(Germany) Daniel Brinkmann	Sacked	15 September 2026		8th	(Germany) Yannic Thiel / (Croatia) Adam Sušac (interim)	15 September 2026		
Hansa Rostock	(Germany) Yannic Thiel / (Croatia) Adam Sušac (interim)	End of caretaker spell	21 September 2026		6th	(Germany) André Breitenreiter	21 September 2026		
Wehen Wiesbaden	(Germany) Frank Steinmetz / (Argentina) Giuliano Modica (interim)	End of caretaker spell	23 September 2026		19th	(Germany) Jochen Seitz	23 September 2026		
FC Ingolstadt	(Germany) Sabrina Wittmann	Sacked	24 September 2026		13th	(Germany) Achim Beierlorzer	25 September 2026		
Fortuna Düsseldorf	(Germany) Alexander Ende	Sacked	18 October 2026		10th	(Germany) Jens Langeneke	18 October 2026		

== League table ==
Pos	Team	Pld	W	D	L	GF	GA	GD	Pts	Promotion, qualification or relegation
1	Viktoria Köln	14	10	2	2	42	19	+23	32	Promotion to 2. Bundesliga and qualification for DFB-Pokal
2	MSV Duisburg	14	10	2	2	35	18	+17	32	Promotion to 2. Bundesliga and qualification for DFB-Pokal
3	Rot-Weiss Essen	14	9	3	2	24	13	+11	30	Qualification for promotion play-offs and DFB-Pokal
4	1. FC Saarbrücken	14	7	2	5	33	27	+6	23	Qualification for DFB-Pokal
5	Alemannia Aachen	14	7	2	5	22	19	+3	23	
6	TSG Hoffenheim II (Note: Reserve teams are ineligible for promotion or DFB-Pokal qualification.)	14	7	1	6	26	20	+6	22	
7	Wehen Wiesbaden	14	6	3	5	27	19	+8	21	
8	VfB Stuttgart II	14	6	3	5	27	23	+4	21	
9	FC Ingolstadt	14	6	3	5	19	24	−5	21	
10	Waldhof Mannheim	14	6	1	7	23	23	0	19	
11	Fortuna Düsseldorf	14	5	4	5	17	18	−1	19	
12	Hansa Rostock	14	5	4	5	22	24	−2	19	
13	SV Meppen	14	5	3	6	19	20	−1	18	
14	Jahn Regensburg	14	4	4	6	25	24	+1	16	
15	Preußen Münster	14	4	3	7	21	29	−8	15	
16	Würzburger Kickers	14	4	2	8	18	27	−9	14	
17	Fortuna Köln	14	3	4	7	12	17	−5	13	Relegation to Regionalliga
18	SC Verl	14	3	3	8	17	30	−13	12	Relegation to Regionalliga
19	Sonnenhof Großaspach	14	3	3	8	14	32	−18	12	Relegation to Regionalliga
20	TSV Havelse	14	2	4	8	18	35	−17	10	Relegation to Regionalliga

Updated to match(es) played on 22 November 2026. Source: DFB
Rules for classification: 1) Points; 2) Goal difference; 3) Goals scored; 4) Head-to-head results; 5) Head-to-head away goals scored; 6) Away goals scored; 7) Play-off.

== Results ==
Home \ Away	AAC	DUI	DÜS	ESS	GRO	HAV	HOF	ING	FOR	VIK	MAN	MEP	MÜN	REG	ROS	SAA	STU	VER	WIE	WÜR
Alemannia Aachen	—		1–0							2–5	3–0	0–3	2–1	2–2	2–0			4–1		
MSV Duisburg		—				2–1	3–2			1–1		3–0			2–0		3–3			3–0
Fortuna Düsseldorf		2–1	—		3–1		0–2					0–0				1–3	1–0	2–2		
Rot-Weiss Essen	1–0			—		1–0			2–0	1–0				1–0	1–1					6–2
Sonnenhof Großaspach				0–1	—		1–0	0–2	1–0		1–5		3–2					1–1		
TSV Havelse					2–2	—		1–1	1–3	1–6	3–2					3–2	2–3			2–2
TSG Hoffenheim II							—		2–2	0–1		1–0	4–0	5–1	2–3			2–1		
FC Ingolstadt	0–3	2–1	3–2	1–0			1–2	—											2–4	2–2
Fortuna Köln	1–1		0–0						—			2–1				0–0	0–1		0–2	1–2
Viktoria Köln					2–2			3–0		—			4–1	2–5	4–0	5–3		3–1		
Waldhof Mannheim			2–1	1–2			4–1	0–3	2–1		—		2–0					0–1		
SV Meppen					2–0	1–1				1–3		—		2–1		1–6	1–1			4–0
Preußen Münster		1–2	1–2	3–3		2–1		1–1	1–0				—			3–3				
Jahn Regensburg		1–2	1–2			5–0								—	2–1	0–1			0–0	2–1
Hansa Rostock			1–1		3–0						3–3	0–2			—		3–2		1–1	
1. FC Saarbrücken		2–4		5–2	2–1			0–1			2–1				2–4	—			2–1	
VfB Stuttgart II	1–2						3–2	5–0		1–3			1–2	3–3			—	1–0		
SC Verl		2–4		0–3					1–2			2–1		2–2				—	1–4	2–1
Wehen Wiesbaden	3–0	1–4		0–0	7–1	3–0					0–1		1–3						—	
Würzburger Kickers	1–0						0–1				2–0				0–2		1–2		4–0	—

Updated to match(es) played on 22 November 2026. Source: DFB
Legend: Blue = home team win; Yellow = draw; Red = away team win.

== Statistics ==
=== Top scorers ===
As of 22 November 2026

Rank	Player	Club	Goals
1	(Germany) David Otto	Viktoria Köln	12
2	(Germany) Lucas Hermes	Jahn Regensburg	10
2	(Germany) Yasin Zor	TSG Hoffenheim II	10
4	(Germany) Niklas Castelle	Viktoria Köln	9
4	(Germany) Lex-Tyger Lobinger	MSV Duisburg	9
6	(Germany) Tarsis Bonga	Würzburger Kickers	7
6	(Germany) Kai Brünker	1. FC Saarbrücken	7
6	(Germany) Lucas Wolf	Viktoria Köln	7
9	(Germany) Florian Pick	1. FC Saarbrücken	6
9	(Germany) Lukas Scepanik	Alemannia Aachen	6
9	(Germany) Mika Schroers	Alemannia Aachen	6
9	(Germany) Semir Telalović	Rot-Weiss Essen	6

=== Hat-tricks ===
Player	Club	Against	Result	Date
(Morocco) Nassim Boujellab	Jahn Regensburg	TSV Havelse	5–0 (H)	10 October 2026
(Germany) Peter Remmert	MSV Duisburg	TSG Hoffenheim II	3–2 (H)	10 October 2026
(United States) Terrence Boyd	Waldhof Mannheim	TSG Hoffenheim II	4–1 (H)	25 October 2026
(Germany) David Otto	Viktoria Köln	TSV Havelse	6–1 (A)	20 November 2026

=== Clean sheets ===
As of 22 November 2026

Rank	Player	Club	Clean sheets
1	(Germany) Jakob Golz	Rot-Weiss Essen	8
2	(Germany) Julius Pünt	SV Meppen	5
2	(Germany) Florian Stritzel	Wehen Wiesbaden	5
4	(Germany) David Klein	FC Ingolstadt	4
4	(Iceland) Lúkas Petersson	TSG Hoffenheim II	4
6	(Germany) Maximilian Braune	MSV Duisburg	3
6	(Germany) Jerik von der Felsen	VfB Stuttgart II	3
6	(Germany) Louis Lord	Fortuna Düsseldorf	3
6	(Germany) Manuel Riemann	Alemannia Aachen	3
6	(Germany) Arne Schulz	Viktoria Köln	3
