= Dylan Leonard =

Australian soccer player (born 2007)

Personal information
- Date of birth: 30 August 2007 (age 19)
- Place of birth: Melbourne, Australia
- Height: 1.87 m (6 ft 2 in)
- Position: Centre-back

Team information
- Current team: Alemannia Aachen (on loan from Schalke 04)
- Number: 4

Youth career
- 2013–2018: Middle Park FC
- 2018–2020: Port Melbourne
- 2020: Melbourne City
- 2020–2024: Port Melbourne

Senior career*
| Years | Team | Apps | (Gls) |
| 2023 | Port Melbourne | 14 | (0) |
| 2024–2025 | Western United NPL | 22 | (0) |
| 2024–2025 | Western United | 25 | (1) |
| 2025– | Schalke 04 | 2 | (0) |
| 2026– | Schalke 04 II | 1 | (0) |
| 2026– | → Alemannia Aachen (loan) | 2 | (0) |

International career^{‡}
| 2024– | Australia U20 | 7 | (0) |
- * Club domestic league appearances and goals as of 15 September 2026 ‡ National team caps and goals as of 10 July 2025

Dylan Leonard (born 30 August 2007) is an Australian professional soccer player who plays as a centre-back for 3. Liga club Alemannia Aachen, on loan from Schalke 04.

Leonard holds the records for Western United's youngest debutant and youngest goalscorer, and was ranked by CIES Football Observatory as one of the top 100 Under-20 players worldwide in 2025.

== Club career ==
After signing a scholarship contract with Western United in June 2024 at the age of 16, Leonard made his A-League Men debut for Western United on Sunday 20 October 2024 against Wellington Phoenix at Wellington Regional Stadium, coming on as an 83rd minute substitute for Tate Russell in an eventual 1–1 draw.

Leonard made his first A-League Men start for Western United on Sunday 27 August 2024 against Western Sydney Wanderers at Ironbark Fields after James Donachie suffered a calf injury prior to the match.

Leonard scored his first A-League Men goal during Western United's Unite Round match against Perth Glory on Friday 22 November 2024, scoring in the 60th minute of an eventual 3–1 win, with Leonard becoming Western United's youngest ever goalscorer.

Leonard became the youngest player to start an A-League Men’s semi final, after starting for Western United in the first leg of their two-legged semi-final against Melbourne City on 16 May 2025, with Leonard receiving Western United's young player of the year award days later.

In May 2025, Leonard was ranked by Traits Insights as statistically the A-League's 11th best player, the A-League's third best centre-back, and Western United's second best player, with Leonard ranking above average among his positional peers across scoring, creating, passing and defending.

Following the suspension of Western United's participation ahead of the 2025–26 season, all players – including Leonard – were released from their contracts in September 2025.

On 15 September 2025, German club Schalke 04 announced that they had signed Leonard until June 2030. On 1 September 2026, he was loaned to Alemannia Aachen for the 2026–27 season.

== International career ==
Leonard was selected in the Young Socceroos squad for the ASEAN U-19 Boys’ Championship in July 2024, with Leonard captaining the side during the group stages as they went on to finish third at the tournament.

In May 2025, Leonard was selected for Australia's Under-18 squad for the UEFA Friendship Cup in June.

== Style of play ==
Leonard is described as a true modern-day centre-back, who mixes composed ball-playing with superb physical strength, leadership and defensive intelligence at the back.

== Personal life ==
Leonard is of Scottish descent, with both of his parents having been born in Scotland, and has been a Celtic F.C. supporter since his childhood, with Leonard harbouring ambitions of one day playing for the team.

Leonard's older brother Mark currently plays for Western United FC Youth as a striker. Mark made his first team debut for Western United as a 58th minute substitute in the 2025 Australia Cup match against Sydney FC on 29 July 2025, marking the first time in Western United history where two brothers featured in the same match.

== Career statistics ==
As of match played 15 September 2026

Appearances and goals by club, season and competition
| Club | Season | League | | | Cup (Note: Includes FFA Cup) | | Other | | Total | |
| Club | Season | Division | Goals | Apps | Goals | Apps | Goals | Apps | Goals | Apps |
|---|---|---|---|---|---|---|---|---|---|---|
| Port Melbourne | 2023 | NPL Victoria | 14 | 0 | – | | 1 (Note: Includes NPL Victoria finals) | 0 | 15 | 0 |
| Western United | 2024–25 | A-League | 25 | 1 | 1 | 0 | 3 (Note: Includes A-League finals series) | 0 | 29 | 1 |
| Western United | 2025–26 | A-League | – | | 1 | 0 | – | | 1 | 0 |
| Western United | Total | | 25 | 1 | 2 | 0 | 3 | 0 | 30 | 1 |
| Schalke 04 | 2025–26 | 2. Bundesliga | 2 | 0 | 0 | 0 | – | | 2 | 0 |
| Schalke 04 II | 2025–26 | Regionalliga West | 1 | 0 | — | | — | | 1 | 0 |
| Alemannia Aachen (loan) | 2026–27 | 3. Liga | 2 | 0 | — | | — | | 2 | 0 |
| Career total | | | 44 | 1 | 2 | 0 | 4 | 0 | 50 | 1 |

== Honours ==
Schalke 04

- 2. Bundesliga: 2025–26
