= Konstantin Aleksa =

Austrian footballer

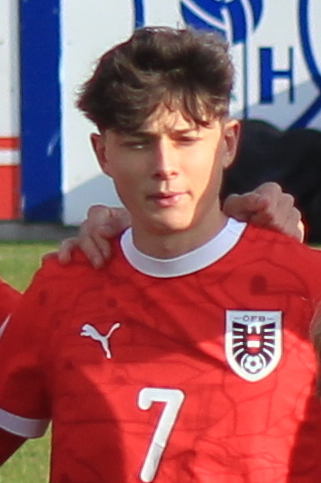
- Aleksa in 2024

Personal information
- Date of birth: 25 April 2007 (age 19)
- Place of birth: Vienna, Austria
- Height: 1.82 m (6 ft 0 in)
- Position: Forward

Team information
- Current team: TSG Hoffenheim II
- Number: 25

Youth career
- 2015–2016: SV Langenzersdorf
- 2016–2024: Austria Wien

Senior career*
Years	Team	Apps	(Gls)
2024–2026	Young Violets	41	(10)
2024–2026	Austria Wien	13	(0)
2026–	TSG Hoffenheim II	0	(0)

International career^{‡}
2021–2022	Austria U15	5	(1)
2022	Austria U16	3	(0)
2023	Austria U17	2	(0)
2024–2025	Austria U18	7	(0)
2025–	Austria U19	5	(0)
- * Club domestic league appearances and goals as of 14:10, 20 July 2026 (UTC) ‡ National team caps and goals as of 14:10, 20 July 2026 (UTC)

Konstantin Aleksa (born 25 April 2007) is an Austrian professional footballer who plays as a forward for the German 3. Liga club TSG 1899 Hoffenheim II.

== Club career ==
Aleksa began playing football with SV Langenzersdorf, before joining the academy of Austria Wien in September 2016 where he finished his development. Aleksa made his debut for Austria Wien's first team in the Austrian Bundesliga in August 2024, coming on as a substitute a 3–1 win over Wolfsberger AC. On 26 February 2025, he extended his contract with Austria Wien until 2028. On 28 May 2026, Aleksa transferred to the Bundesliga side TSG Hoffenheim, where he was first assigned to their reserves.

== International career ==
Aleksa is a youth international for Austria, having played up to the Austria U19s.
