= FC 08 Homburg =

- Full name: Fußball-Club 08 Homburg-Saar e.V.
- Founded: 1908; 118 years ago
- Stadium: Waldstadion Homburg
- Capacity: 16,488
- Chairman: Hans Gassert
- Head coach: Roland Seitz
- League: Regionalliga Südwest (IV)
- 2025–26: Regionalliga Südwest, 4th of 18
- Website: fc08homburg.de
Home colours	Away colours

Fußball-Club 08 Homburg or simply FC Homburg is a German association football club based in Homburg, Saarland, that competes in the Regionalliga Südwest.

== History ==
The club was founded on 1 August 1908 as Fussball Club Homburg by a group of seventeen young men at the local Hohenburg pub.

In February 1913 they were renamed Fussballverein Homburg and went on to take the local championship that season. By the mid-1920s the side was playing second-division football, but folded on 27 August 1936. A new multi-sport club known as VfL Homburg was formed 5 March 1937 out of a group of local sides that included Turnverein 1878 Homburg, Schwimmverein Homburg, Kraftsportverein Homburg, Boxclub Homburg, Tennis-Club Homburg, as well as the former membership of the defunct FV. The footballers again took up play in second-tier competition and failed in two attempts (1938, 1941) to win their way through the regional promotion playoff to the first division Gauliga Südwest.

After World War II, Allied occupation authorities dissolved all types of associations in Germany, including football clubs. The club was soon re-constituted as Sportverein Homburg and won a division championship in the Amateurliga Saarland (III) in 1948 before resuming the name FC Homburg in January 1949.

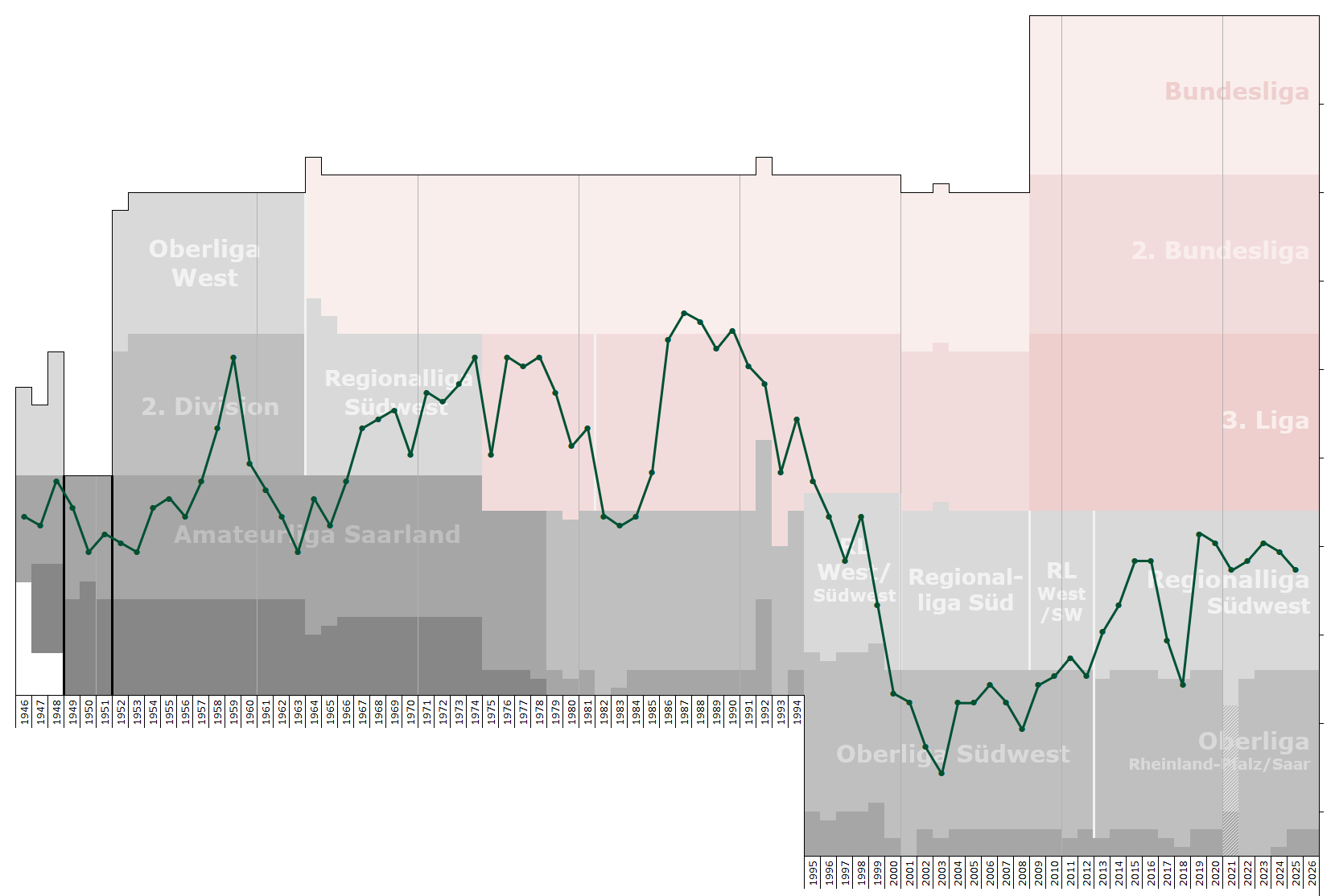
Historical chart of FC Homburg league performance

The Saarland was occupied by the French who made various efforts to see the state become independent of Germany or join France. In sport this was manifested as separate 1952 Olympic and 1954 World Cup teams for Saarland, the establishment of a short-lived football league for the state, and the German club 1. FC Saarbrücken playing in the French second division. Homburg played in the Saarland Ehrenliga from 1949 to 1951 as FC Homburg-Saar. By the time of the 1951–52 season the return of German teams to the German Football Association had been negotiated: the Ehrenliga faded away and by 1956 the independent Saarland Fussball Bund had re-joined the DFB.

A second Amateurliga Saarland title in 1957 advanced FC to the 2. Liga-Südwest (II) and in December of that year they adopted the name FC 08 Homburg/Saar. The club was relegated to the Amateurliga in 1960 which had become a fourth-tier circuit by 1963.

In the late 1970s, the team advanced to the quarter-finals of the DFB-Pokal on two occasions, and, on into the early 1980s, moved frequently between third- and fourth-tier play. In the second half of the decade the team was greatly successful. They played their way back to the second division and on into the Bundesliga in 1986. Homburg played two seasons there, were relegated, and returned for one final Bundesliga season in 1989–90 before beginning a gradual descent which would lead them to Oberliga Südwest (IV) where they play today.

The team was able to beat the famous club FC Bayern Munich in Munich 4–2 after extra time in the first round of the 1991–92 DFB-Pokal. They were relegated from the 2. Bundesliga after the 1994–95 season.

In 1988, the DFB prohibited the team from wearing the sponsorship logo of a condom manufacturer on ethical and moral grounds. In 1998, they entered into an agreement with 1. FC Saarbrücken to loan players to that team to help improve Homburg's financial situation. In 1999, the club became close to bankruptcy, which led to them being denied a license to play in the Regionalliga West/Südwest (III) and demotion to the Oberliga Südwest (IV). The club qualified for the 2006–07 German Cup, exiting in the first round 1–2 to Bundesliga side VfL Bochum. Homburg was finally promoted to Regionalliga West after finishing atop the Oberliga Südwest ahead of FK Pirmasens on a goal differential of plus 2 in the 2009–10 season. Their Regionalliga cameo ended with a 17th place finish and a return to fifth tier play. Homburg won the Oberliga Südwest title and qualified for the Regionalliga Südwest (IV) for 2012–13.

== Honours ==
The club's honours:

=== League ===
- German amateur championship
  - Champions: 1983
- 2. Bundesliga (II)
  - Champions: 1986
  - Runners-up: 1989
- Oberliga Südwest (III/V)
  - Champions: 1982, 1984, 2010, 2012
- Amateurliga Saarland (III)
  - Champions: 1948, 1957, 1966

=== Cup ===
- Saarland Cup (Tiers III–VII)
  - Winners: 1983, 2001, 2006, 2008, 2014, 2016, 2025
  - Runners-up: 1996, 1998, 2003, 2007, 2015, 2020, 2022, 2024, 2026

== Recent managers ==
Recent managers of the club:

Manager	Start	Finish
Christian Hock	14 November 2010	21 April 2011
(Guinea) Taifour Diane	22 April 2011	30 June 2011
Christian Titz	1 July 2011	10 April 2014
Sebastian Stache	7 April 2014	21 April 2014
Robert Jung	22 April 2014	30 June 2014
Jens Kiefer	1 July 2014	14 April 2017
Jürgen Luginger	17 April 2017	30 June 2020
Matthias Mink	1 July 2020	17 February 2021
(Greece) Joti Stamatopoulos	18 February 2021	8 March 2021
Timo Wenzel	9 March 2021	23 April 2023
Sven Sökler	24 April 2023	30 June 2023
Danny Schwarz	1 July 2023	3 December 2024
Roland Seitz	1 January 2025	-

== Recent seasons ==
The recent season-by-season performance of the club:

Season	Division	Tier	Position
1984–85	2. Bundesliga	II	16th
1985–86	2. Bundesliga	II	1st ↑
1986–87	1. Bundesliga	I	16th
1987–88	1. Bundesliga	I	17th ↓
1988–89	2. Bundesliga	II	2nd ↑
1989–90	1. Bundesliga	I	18th ↓
1990–91	2. Bundesliga	II	4th
1991–92	2. Bundesliga	II	6th
1992–93	2. Bundesliga	II	16th
1993–94	2. Bundesliga	II	10th
1994–95	2. Bundesliga	II	17th ↓
1999–2000	Oberliga Südwest	IV	3rd
2000–01	Oberliga Südwest	IV	4th
2001–02	Oberliga Südwest	IV	9th
2002–03	Oberliga Südwest	IV	12th
2003–04	Oberliga Südwest	IV	4th
2004–05	Oberliga Südwest	IV	4th
2005–06	Oberliga Südwest	IV	2nd
2006–07	Oberliga Südwest	IV	4th
2007–08	Oberliga Südwest	IV	7th
2008–09	Oberliga Südwest	V	2nd
2009–10	Oberliga Südwest	V	1st ↑
2010–11	Regionalliga West	IV	17th ↓
2011–12	Oberliga Südwest	V	1st ↑
2012–13	Regionalliga Südwest	IV	14th
2013–14	Regionalliga Südwest	IV	11th
2014–15	Regionalliga Südwest	IV	6th
2015–16	Regionalliga Südwest	IV	6th
2016–17	Regionalliga Südwest	IV	15th ↓
2017–18	Oberliga Rheinland-Pfalz/Saar	V	1st ↑
2018–19	Regionalliga Südwest	IV	3rd
2019–20	Regionalliga Südwest	IV	4th
2020–21	Regionalliga Südwest	IV	7th
2021–22	Regionalliga Südwest	IV	6th
2022–23	Regionalliga Südwest	IV	4th
2023–24	Regionalliga Südwest	IV	5th
2024–25	Regionalliga Südwest	IV	8th
2025–26	Regionalliga Südwest	IV	4th

- With the introduction of the Regionalligas in 1994 and the 3. Liga in 2008 as the new third tier, below the 2. Bundesliga, all leagues below dropped one tier. In 2012, the number of Regionalligas was increased from three to five with all Regionalliga West clubs from the Saarland and Rhineland-Palatinate entering the new Regionalliga Südwest.

=== Key ===
↑ Promoted	↓ Relegated

== Current squad ==
As of 8 September 2026

Note: Flags indicate national team as defined under FIFA eligibility rules; some limited exceptions apply. Players may hold more than one non-FIFA nationality.

No.	Pos.	Nation	Player
1	GK	GER	Michael Gelt
2	DF	LUX	Yohann Torres
3	DF	GER	Frederik Schumann
4	DF	GER	Aaron Manu
5	MF	GER	Michael Guthörl
6	MF	SUI	Nicolas Andermatt
7	MF	KOS	Armend Qenaj
8	MF	GER	Simon Joachims
9	FW	GER	Marc Ehrhart
10	FW	LBN	Hilal El-Helwe
11	MF	GER	Nicolas Jorg
13	DF	MKD	Kristijan Taseski (on loan from Würzburger Kickers)

No.	Pos.	Nation	Player
16	DF	GER	Jan-Erik Eichhorn
17	MF	GER	Justin Petermann
20	MF	GER	Julian Günther-Schmidt
21	MF	GER	Manuel Feil
23	FW	GER	Emir Kuhinja
26	DF	GER	Tim Steinmetz
27	FW	GER	Jacob Roden
28	MF	GER	Birkan Celik
30	DF	GER	Michael Heilig
33	GK	GER	Jonas Weyand
36	DF	GER	Phillipp Steinhart
37	GK	GER	Lukas Hoffmann

=== Out on loan ===
Note: Flags indicate national team as defined under FIFA eligibility rules; some limited exceptions apply. Players may hold more than one non-FIFA nationality.

No.	Pos.	Nation	Player
