= Matthew Moore (footballer) =

Personal information
- Date of birth: 27 March 2007 (age 19)
- Place of birth: Carrigaline, Ireland
- Height: 1.69 m (5 ft 7 in)
- Position: Midfielder

Team information
- Current team: TSG 1899 Hoffenheim II

Youth career
- Carrigaline United
- 2021–2023: Cork City
- 2023–2026: TSG 1899 Hoffenheim

Senior career*
Years	Team	Apps	(Gls)
2026–	TSG 1899 Hoffenheim II	10	(0)

International career
- Republic of Ireland U16
- Republic of Ireland U17
- * Club domestic league appearances and goals as of 21:59, 22 November 2026 (UTC)

Matthew Moore (born 27 March 2007) is an Irish footballer who plays for German club TSG 1899 Hoffenheim II, as a midfielder.

== Club career ==
Born in Carrigaline, Moore moved from Carrigaline United to Cork City at under-14 level. In April 2023 it was announced that he would sign for German club TSG 1899 Hoffenheim in July 2023. By April 2024 he was one of two young Irish players in Germany, alongside Finn Sherlock.

Moore captained Hoffenheim's under-19 team to the league title in May 2026, after which he was promoted to the club's second team to play in the 3. Liga.

== International career ==
Moore captained Ireland at under-16 level, and also played for them at under-17 level. In June 2023 he was named Ireland's under-16 player of the year.

== Playing style ==
In April 2023 Moore was described by Cork City manager Colin Healy as "brilliant. He's a very, very good player. He’s very determined, he’s got a lot of quality".
