= TSG 1899 Hoffenheim II =

German football club, based in Hoffenheim

- Full name: Turn- und Sportgemeinschaft; 1899 Hoffenheim e.V.
- Nicknames: Die Kraichgauer (From Kraichgau region), Hoffe zwo
- Founded: 1 July 1899; 127 years ago (club)
- Ground: Dietmar-Hopp-Stadion
- Capacity: 6,350
- Chairman: Prof. Dr. Jan Mayer; Alexander Rosen; Denni Strich
- Manager: Stefan Kleineheismann
- League: 3. Liga
- 2025–26: 3. Liga, 16th of 20
- Website: www.tsg-hoffenheim.de/u23/
Home colours	Away colours	Third colours

TSG 1899 Hoffenheim II is the reserve team of German association football club TSG 1899 Hoffenheim, based in Hoffenheim, Baden-Württemberg. The team was promoted to the third-tier 3. Liga for the first time for the 2025–26 season.

== History ==
With the rise of the first team the club's reserve side, TSG 1899 Hoffenheim II, started to climb through the ranks, too. It entered the Verbandsliga Baden in 2001, only a year after the senior team had won this league, and won promotion to the Oberliga Baden-Württemberg in its second season there after coming second in the Verbandsliga.

After seven seasons in the Oberliga where it gradually improved season by season the team won promotion to the Regionalliga Süd after a league title in 2010. With the disbanding of the Regionalliga Süd in 2012 Hoffenheim II became part of the new Regionalliga Südwest.

Hoffenheim II spent 15 seasons playing in the Regionalliga before a first place finish in 2025 saw the team promoted to the 3. Liga for the first time.

== Players ==
=== Current squad ===
As of 3 September 2026

No.	Pos.	Nation	Player
1	GK	ISL	Lúkas Petersson
2	DF	GER	Natnael Abraha
4	DF	GER	Lars Strobl
5	MF	ALB	Klaus Gjasula
6	MF	GER	Valentin Lässig (captain)
7	FW	GER	Oskar Hencke
8	MF	TUR	Diren Dağdeviren
9	FW	GER	Ben Opoku Labes
10	MF	GER	Yasin Zor
11	FW	GER	Jykese Fields
13	DF	GER	Tristan Spranger
15	MF	IRL	Matthew Moore
17	FW	ANG	Blessing Makanda
18	FW	GER	Lion Wagenbach
19	FW	GER	Zain Biazid
20	MF	GER	Tiago Poller

No.	Pos.	Nation	Player
21	DF	GER	Timo Hildmann
22	DF	GER	Tim Müller
23	MF	CZE	Alex Honajzer
25	FW	AUT	Konstantin Aleksa
26	MF	CZE	Kryštof Čížek
27	GK	GER	Tobias Trautner
28	MF	AUT	Florian Micheler
30	FW	GER	Nader El-Jindaoui
32	GK	GER	Tim Philipp
33	GK	GER	Nils Schlosser
34	GK	GER	Nico Biedermann
36	FW	CRO	Jakov Dedić
40	DF	AUT	Santino Pistrol
41	DF	IRL	Finn Sherlock
44	DF	GER	Maxime Ndong-Penda
47	DF	GER	Maximilian Theuer

==== Staff ====
Head coach	(Germany) Kai Herdling
Assistant coach	(Germany) Matthias Cuntz
Goalkeeper coach	(Germany) Alexander Stolz
Athletics coach	(Germany) Markus Zidek

== Honours ==
The club's honours:

- Regionalliga Südwest (IV)
  - Champions: 2024–25
- Oberliga Baden-Württemberg (V)
  - Champions: 2010
  - Runners-up: 2009
- Verbandsliga Nordbaden (V)
  - Runners-up: 2002, 2003
- Landesliga Nordbaden II
  - Champions: 2001

== Recent seasons ==
The recent season-by-season performance of the club:

Season	Division	Tier	Position
2000–01	Landesliga Nordbaden II	VI	1st↑
2001–02	Verbandsliga Nordbaden	V	2nd
2002–03	Verbandsliga Nordbaden	V	2nd↑
2003–04	Oberliga Baden-Württemberg	IV	10th
2004–05	Oberliga Baden-Württemberg	IV	8th
2005–06	Oberliga Baden-Württemberg	IV	6th
2006–07	Oberliga Baden-Württemberg	IV	8th
2007–08	Oberliga Baden-Württemberg	IV	5th
2008–09	Oberliga Baden-Württemberg	V	2nd
2009–10	Oberliga Baden-Württemberg	V	1st↑
2010–11	Regionalliga Süd	IV	5th
2011–12	Regionalliga Süd	IV	7th
2012–13	Regionalliga Südwest	IV	9th
2013–14	Regionalliga Südwest	IV	10th
2014–15	Regionalliga Südwest	IV	9th
2015–16	Regionalliga Südwest	IV	3rd
2016–17	Regionalliga Südwest	IV	4th
2017–18	Regionalliga Südwest	IV	6th
2018–19	Regionalliga Südwest	IV	10th
2019–20	Regionalliga Südwest	IV	9th
2020–21	Regionalliga Südwest	IV	16th
2021–22	Regionalliga Südwest	IV	13th
2022–23	Regionalliga Südwest	IV	3rd
2023–24	Regionalliga Südwest	IV	3rd
2024–25	Regionalliga Südwest	IV	1st↑
2025–26	3. Liga	III	16th
2026–27	3. Liga	III	

- With the introduction of the Regionalligas in 1994 and the 3. Liga in 2008 as the new third tier, below the 2. Bundesliga, all leagues below dropped one tier. In 2012, the number of Regionalligas was increased from three to five with all Regionalliga Süd clubs except the Bavarian ones entering the new Regionalliga Südwest.

=== Key ===
↑ Promoted	↓ Relegated
