= 2024–25 Western United FC season =

Western United
2024–25 season
- Owner: Western Melbourne Group, Sayers Road Investment Co, Jaszac Investments - Jason Sourasis, Theodore Andriopoulos, Steve Horvat, Levent Shevki and John Tripodi
- Head Coach: John Aloisi
- Stadium: Ironbark Fields; AAMI Park
- A-League Men: 3rd
- A-League Men Finals: Semi-final
- Australia Cup: Play-offs
- Top goalscorer: League: Noah Botic (12); All: Noah Botic (16)
- Highest home attendance: 5,263 vs. Melbourne Victory (1 December 2024); A-League Men
- Lowest home attendance: 2,476 vs. Central Coast Mariners (29 January 2025); A-League Men
- Average home league attendance: 3,644
- Biggest win: 4–0 vs. Auckland FC (A) (21 December 2024); A-League Men
- Biggest defeat: 1–4 vs. Newcastle Jets (N) (24 July 2024); Australia Cup; 0–3 vs. Melbourne City (A) (16 May 2025); A-League Men finals series
- All statistics correct as of 24 May 2025.

The 2024–25 season is Western United Football Club's sixth season in the A-League Men. In addition to the domestic league, Western United also participated in this season's edition of the Australia Cup.

== Players ==
Note: Flags indicate national team as defined under FIFA eligibility rules; some limited exceptions apply. Players may hold more than one non-FIFA nationality.

No.	Pos.	Nation	Player
4	DF	AUS	James Donachie
5	FW	AUS	Oliver Lavale (scholarship)
6	DF	JPN	Tomoki Imai (vice-captain)
7	FW	AUS	Ramy Najjarine
9	FW	JPN	Hiroshi Ibusuki
10	MF	AUS	Matthew Grimaldi
13	DF	AUS	Tate Russell
14	FW	AUS	Jake Najdovski
17	DF	AUS	Ben Garuccio (captain)
19	FW	AUS	Noah Botic
20	FW	AUS	Abel Walatee (scholarship)
21	MF	AUS	Sebastian Pasquali
22	DF	AUS	Kane Vidmar (scholarship)
23	MF	AUS	Rhys Bozinovski

No.	Pos.	Nation	Player
24	FW	AUS	Michael Ruhs
29	DF	IRQ	Charbel Shamoon (scholarship)
30	DF	AUS	Dylan Leonard (scholarship)
32	MF	AUS	Angus Thurgate
33	GK	AUS	Matt Sutton
34	MF	AUS	James York (scholarship)
35	GK	AUS	Alex Nassiep (scholarship)
37	FW	AUS	Luke Vickery (scholarship)
41	DF	AUS	Besian Kutleshi (scholarship)
43	DF	AUS	Khoder Kaddour (scholarship)
44	MF	AUS	Jordan Lauton
47	DF	NZL	Luka Coveny (scholarship)
70	GK	AUS	Michael Vonja
77	MF	JPN	Riku Danzaki

== Transfers and contracts ==
=== Transfers in ===
No.	Position	Name	From	Type/fee	Contract length	Date	Ref.
9	FW	(Japan) Hiroshi Ibusuki	Unattached	Free transfer	2 years	21 May 2024	
13	DF	Tate Russell	Western Sydney Wanderers	Free transfer	2 years	14 June 2024	
41	DF	Besian Kutleshi	Melbourne City NPL	Free transfer	3-year scholarship	2 August 2024	

==== From youth squad ====
N	Pos.	Nat.	Name	Age	Notes
20	FW	(Australia)	Abel Walatee	20	2 year scholarship contract
37	FW	(Australia)	Luke Vickery	18	2 year scholarship contract
43	DF	(Australia)	Khoder Kaddour	20	2 year scholarship contract
30	DF	(Australia)	Dylan Leonard	16	2 year scholarship contract
47	DF	(New Zealand)	Luka Coveny	18	2 year scholarship contract
34	MF	(Australia)	James York	19	scholarship contract
44	MF	(Australia)	Jordan Lauton	21	1-year scholarship contract
29	DF	(Iraq)	Charbel Shamoon	20	1 year scholarship contract
35	GK	(Australia)	Alex Nassiep	18	3.5 year scholarship contract

=== Transfers out ===
No.	Position	Name	To	Type/fee	Date	Ref.
19	DF	Josh Risdon	Unattached	End of contract	8 May 2024	
10	MF	Steven Lustica	Unattached	End of contract	10 May 2024	
13	FW	Nikita Rukavytsya	Unattached	End of contract	10 May 2024	
24	DF	Connor O'Toole	Unattached	End of contract	10 May 2024	
27	DF	Jacob Tratt	Unattached	End of contract	10 May 2024	
8	FW	Lachlan Wales	(South Korea) Gyeongnam FC	End of contract	28 June 2024	
11	MF	(Brazil) Daniel Penha	(Brazil) Atlético Mineiro	End of loan	12 July 2024	
1	GK	Tom Heward-Belle	(Japan) Montedio Yamagata	Undisclosed	18 January 2025	

=== Contract extensions ===
No.	Name	Position	Duration	Date	Notes	Ref.
21	Sebastian Pasquali	Central midfielder	2 years	11 June 2024		
23	Rhys Bozinovski	Defensive midfielder	3 years	9 September 2024	New 3-year contract, replacing previous contract which was until end of 2024–25	
44	Jordan Lauton	Central midfielder	2 years	27 January 2025	Contract extended from end of 2024–25 to end of 2026–27.	
33	Matt Sutton	Goalkeeper	2 years	5 February 2025	Contract extended from end of 2024–25 to end of 2026–27.	

== Pre-season and friendlies ==
Win Draw Loss Fixtures

3 August 2024	Western United (Australia)	8–0	(Australia) St Albans Saints	Melbourne
11:10 AEST	Thurgate ?'; ? ?' (o.g.); Najdovski ?'; Vickery ?', ?'; Walatee ?'; Koek ?'; M. Leonard ?'	Report		Stadium: Ironbark Fields; Attendance: 0 (behind closed doors)

22 August 2024	Western United (Australia)	1–2	(Australia) Caroline Springs George Cross	Melbourne
19:00 AEST	Walatee 88'	Report	? 7'; ? 71'	Stadium: City Vista Recreation Reserve

30 August 2024	Port Melbourne (Australia)	1–1	(Australia) Western United	Melbourne
19:30 AEST	? 21'	Report	Obani 83'	Stadium: JL Murphy Reserve

14 September 2024	Western United (Australia)	2–0	(Australia) Melbourne City	Melbourne
11:00 AEST	Ibusuki 29'; Lavale 71'	Report		Stadium: Ironbark Fields; Attendance: 0 (behind closed doors)

25 September 2024	Western United (Australia)	1–2	(New Zealand) Auckland FC	Melbourne
13:00 AEST	Lavale 23'	Report	Bidois 68'; Rogerson 72'	Stadium: Ironbark Fields

6 October 2024	Melbourne City (Australia)	1–1	(Australia) Western United	Melbourne
	Jeggo	Report	Garuccio	Stadium: Casey Fields

11 October 2024	Western United (Australia)	3–1	(Australia) Melbourne Victory	Melbourne
	Walatee ?'; Danzaki ?', ?'	Report	Teague ?'	Stadium: Ironbark Fields; Attendance: 0 (behind closed doors)

== Competitions ==
=== Overall record ===
Competition	First match	Last match	Starting round	Final position	Record							
Competition	First match	Last match	Starting round	Final position	Pld	W	D	L	GF	GA	GD	Win %
A-League Men	20 October 2024	3 May 2025	Matchday 1	3rd	26	14	5	7	55	37	+18	53.85
A-League Men final series	9 May 2025	24 May 2025	Elimination final	Semi-finals	3	1	1	1	4	6	−2	33.33
Australia Cup	24 July 2024		Play-offs	Play-offs	1	0	0	1	1	4	−3	0.00
Total					30	15	6	9	60	47	+13	50.00

Last updated: 24 May 2025
Source: Competitions

=== A-League Men ===
==== League table ====
Pos	Team	Pld	W	D	L	GF	GA	GD	Pts	Qualification
1	Auckland FC (Note: Auckland FC and Wellington Phoenix cannot qualify for Asian Football Confederation competitions as they are based in New Zealand, which is part of the Oceania Football Confederation.)	26	15	8	3	49	27	+22	53	Qualification for Finals series (Note: The top two teams enter the finals series at the semi-finals, while the teams ranked third to sixth enter the finals series at the elimination-finals.)
2	Melbourne City (C)	26	14	6	6	41	25	+16	48	Qualification for AFC Champions League Elite and Finals series
3	Western United	26	14	5	7	55	37	+18	47	Qualification for Finals series
4	Western Sydney Wanderers	26	13	7	6	58	40	+18	46	Qualification for Finals series
5	Melbourne Victory	26	12	7	7	44	36	+8	43	Qualification for Finals series

Source: A-Leagues
Rules for classification: 1) points; 2) goal difference; 3) goals scored; 4) wins; 5) head-to-head results; 5a) head-to-head points; 5b) head-to-head goal difference; 6) Fair Play points; 7) away goal difference; 8) away goals per match; 9) home goal difference; 10) home goals per match; 11) toss of a coin in an event of a tie of two clubs.
(C) Champions

==== Results summary ====
Overall								Home						Away					
Pld	W	D	L	GF	GA	GD	Pts	W	D	L	GF	GA	GD	W	D	L	GF	GA	GD
26	14	5	7	55	37	+18	47	7	3	3	23	14	+9	7	2	4	32	23	+9

Last updated: 3 May 2025.
Source: Ultimate A-League
Away figures include Western United's 3–1 win on neutral ground in Unite Round against Perth Glory on 22 November 2024.

==== Results by round ====
Round	1	2	3	4	5	6	7	8	9	10	11	12	17	13	15	16	14	18	19	20	21	22	23	24	25	26	27	28	29
Ground	A	H	H	A	N	H	H	A	A	H	B	A	A	A	H	B	H	A	H	H	A	H	A	B	H	A	A	H	H
Result	D	D	L	L	W	L	D	W	W	W	X	W	L	W	W	X	D	D	L	W	W	W	W	X	W	L	L	W	W
Position	6	8	10	11	9	10	10	8	6	5	6	6	5	5	4	5	4	3	5	3	2	2	2	2	2	3	3	3	3
Points	1	2	2	2	5	5	6	9	12	15	15	18	18	21	24	24	25	26	26	29	32	35	38	38	41	41	41	44	47

Updated to match(es) played on 3 May 2025. Source: Ultimate A-League
A = Away; H = Home; N = Neutral; B = Bye; W = Win; D = Draw; L = Loss; X = Bye

==== Matches ====
Win Draw Loss Fixtures

20 October 2024 1	Wellington Phoenix	1–1	Western United	Wellington
16:00 NZDT	Barbarouses 45+2'	Report	Thurgate 76'	Stadium: Sky Stadium; Attendance: 7,535; Referee: Adam Kersey

27 October 2024 2	Western United	1–1	Western Sydney Wanderers	Melbourne
16:00 AEDT	Ibusuki 48'	Report	Borrello 14'	Stadium: Ironbark Fields; Attendance: 4,207; Referee: Alireza Faghani

4 November 2024 3	Western United	0–1	Melbourne City	Melbourne
19:00 AEDT		Report	Nabbout 49'	Stadium: AAMI Park; Attendance: 4,325; Referee: Ben Abraham

9 November 2024 4	Adelaide United	2–1	Western United	Adelaide
19:05 ACDT	Leonard 32' (o.g.); Clough 71'	Report	Vidmar 10'	Stadium: Coopers Stadium; Attendance: 10,166; Referee: Daniel Elder
Note: Originally scheduled for 20:00, the match was brought forward 55 minutes.

22 November 2024 5	Perth Glory	1–3	Western United	Sydney
17:30 AEDT	Ostler 52'	Report	Leonard 60'; Ibusuki 65', 76'	Stadium: Allianz Stadium; Attendance: 2,425; Referee: Alireza Faghani

1 December 2024 6	Western United	1–3	Melbourne Victory	Melbourne
19:35 AEDT	Botic 19'	Report	Machach 8'; Vergos 48'; Fornaroli 69'	Stadium: AAMI Park; Attendance: 5,263; Referee: Adam Bavcar

7 December 2024 7	Western United	0–0	Macarthur FC	Melbourne
18:00 AEDT		Report		Stadium: Ironbark Fields; Attendance: 2,867; Referee: Alex King

14 December 2024 8	Sydney FC	3–4	Western United	Sydney
17:00 AEDT	Segecic 37', 47'; Grant 68'	Report	Botic 3'; Walatee 46'; Bozinovski 62'; Ruhs 87'	Stadium: Allianz Stadium; Attendance: 11,757; Referee: Jack Morgan

21 December 2024 9	Auckland FC	0–4	Western United	Auckland
17:00 NZDT		Report	Danzaki 17' (pen.); Botic 23'; Ibusuki 34'; Grimaldi 87'	Stadium: Go Media Stadium; Attendance: 13,681; Referee: Casey Reibelt

29 December 2024 10	Western United	1–0	Brisbane Roar	Melbourne
17:00 AEDT	Ibusuki 44' (pen.)	Report		Stadium: Ironbark Fields; Attendance: 4,187; Referee: Alex King

3 January 2025 12	Perth Glory	2–3	Western United	Perth
18:45 AWST	Taggart 29'; Carluccio 66'	Report	Grimaldi 32'; Russell 90+1'; Lauton 90+5'	Stadium: HBF Park; Attendance: 4,564; Referee: Ben Abraham

7 January 2025 17	Melbourne City	2–0	Western United	Melbourne
18:00 AEDT	Politidis 32'; Mazzeo 59'	Report		Stadium: AAMI Park; Attendance: 5,018; Referee: Adam Bavcar

10 January 2025 13	Melbourne Victory	3–4	Western United	Melbourne
19:35 AEDT	Hamill 9'; Fornaroli 39'; Santos 79'	Report	Ibusuki 17', 90+4'; Walatee 69'; Botic 90+1'	Stadium: AAMI Park; Attendance: 11,657; Referee: Adam Kersey

17 January 2025 15	Western United	3–1	Newcastle Jets	Melbourne
17:00 AEDT	Danzaki 17'; Botic 37', 54'	Report	Rose 58'	Stadium: Ironbark Fields; Attendance: 3,430; Referee: Adam Bavcar

29 January 2025 14	Western United	2–2	Central Coast Mariners	Melbourne
19:00 AEDT	Botic 33'; Garuccio 74'	Report	Doka 39'; Edmondson 42'	Stadium: Ironbark Fields; Attendance: 2,476; Referee: Daniel Elder

9 February 2025 18	Macarthur FC	2–2	Western United	Sydney
17:00 AEDT	Hollman 32'; Jakoliš 79'	Report	Botic 23'; Walatee 45+4'	Stadium: Campbelltown Sports Stadium; Attendance: 3,627; Referee: Casey Reibelt

15 February 2025 19	Western United	0–2	Auckland FC	Melbourne
18:00 AEDT		Report	May 44'; Mata 45+2'	Stadium: Ironbark Fields; Attendance: 3,862; Referee: Tim Danaskos

23 February 2025 20	Western United	3–0	Adelaide United	Tarneit
17:00 AEDT	Botic 26'; Ibusuki 59' (pen.); Danzaki 88'	Report		Stadium: Ironbark Fields; Attendance: 2,982; Referee: Shaun Evans

28 February 2025 21	Central Coast Mariners	1–3	Western United	Gosford
19:35 AEDT	Imai 76' (o.g.)	Report	Botic 52'; Vickery 81'; Ruhs 90+1'	Stadium: Industree Group Stadium; Attendance: 4,481; Referee: Ben Abraham

8 March 2025 22	Western United	4–1	Wellington Phoenix	Melbourne
18:00 AEDT	Walatee 3'; Ibusuki 33'; Grimaldi 51', 62'	Report	Walker 82'	Stadium: Ironbark Fields; Attendance: 3,993; Referee: Shane Skinner

16 March 2025 23	Newcastle Jets	2–6	Western United	Newcastle
17:00 AEDT	M'Mombwa 65'; Thurgate 72' (o.g.)	Report	Botic 6'; Natta 8' (o.g.); Bozinovski 29', 53'; Danzaki 35'; Ruhs 85'	Stadium: McDonald Jones Stadium; Attendance: 5,816; Referee: Daniel Elder

5 April 2025 25	Western United	3–1	Perth Glory	Melbourne
18:00 AEDT	Bozinovski 3'; Gomulka 65' (o.g.); Najjarine 86'	Report	Pearman 55'	Stadium: Ironbark Fields; Attendance: 3,781; Referee: Shane Skinner

13 April 2025 26	Western Sydney Wanderers	0–2	Western United	Sydney
17:00 AEST	Gersbach 45'; Sutton 66' (o.g.)	Report		Stadium: CommBank Stadium; Attendance: 13,041; Referee: Ben Abraham

17 April 2025 27	Brisbane Roar	2–1	Western United	Brisbane
19:35 AEST	Klein 2'; Berenguer 24'	Report	Ibusuki 45'	Stadium: Suncorp Stadium; Attendance: 3,487; Referee: Lachlan Keevers

27 April 2025 28	Western United	1–0	Sydney FC	Melbourne
17:00 AEST	Grimaldi 4'	Report		Stadium: Ironbark Fields; Attendance: 2,886; Referee: Alex King

3 May 2025 29	Western United	4–2	Auckland FC	Melbourne
18:00 AEST	Ruhs 18'; Botic 23'; Thurgate 49'; Lavale 90+6'	Report	Moreno 62'; Randall 90+4'	Stadium: Ironbark Fields; Attendance: 3,109; Referee: Daniel Elder

==== Finals series ====
9 May 2025 Elimination-finals	Western United	3–2	Adelaide United	Melbourne
19:35 AEST	Botic 20', 31', 62'	Report	Jovanovic 3'; Mauk 79'	Stadium: Ironbark Fields; Attendance: 3,078; Referee: Alex King

16 May 2025 Semi-finals First leg	Western United	0–3	Melbourne City	Melbourne
19:35 AEST		Report	Ferreyra 16'; Cohen 54'; Leckie 72'	Stadium: AAMI Park; Attendance: 5,186; Referee: Shaun Evans

24 May 2025 Semi-finals Second leg	Melbourne City	1–1 (4–1 agg.)	Western United	Melbourne
19:35 AEST	Behich 20'	Report	Botic 66'	Stadium: AAMI Park; Attendance: 7,691; Referee: Adam Kersey

=== Australia Cup ===
24 July 2024 Play-offs	Newcastle Jets	4–1	Western United	Darwin
17:25 ACST	Garuccio 17' (o.g.); Aquilina 29', 66'; Grimaldi 42'	Report	Danzaki 89'	Stadium: Larrakia Park; Attendance: 1,238; Referee: Tim Danaskos

== Statistics ==
=== Appearances and goals ===
Includes all competitions. Players with no appearances not included in the list.

As of match played 24 May 2025

No.	Pos.	Nat.	Name	A-League Men		A-League Men finals series		Australia Cup		Total	
No.	Pos.	Nat.	Name	Apps	Goals	Apps	Goals	Apps	Goals	Apps	Goals
4	DF	(Australia)	James Donachie	4+3	0	2	0	1	0	10	0
5	FW	(Australia)	Oliver Lavale	3+3	1	0+2	0	1	0	9	1
6	DF	(Japan)	Tomoki Imai	24	0	3	0	0	0	27	0
7	FW	(Australia)	Ramy Najjarine	1+15	1	0+3	0	0	0	19	1
9	FW	(Japan)	Hiroshi Ibusuki	23+1	10	1+2	0	0+1	0	28	10
10	MF	(Australia)	Matthew Grimaldi	18+8	5	2+1	0	1	0	30	5
13	DF	(Australia)	Tate Russell	22+2	1	1+2	0	1	0	28	1
14	FW	(Australia)	Jake Najdovski	0+9	0	0	0	0	0	9	0
17	DF	(Australia)	Ben Garuccio	14+1	1	3	0	1	0	19	1
19	FW	(Australia)	Noah Botic	22+4	12	2+1	4	0	0	29	16
20	FW	(Australia)	Abel Walatee	10+9	3	1+2	0	0+1	0	23	3
21	MF	(Australia)	Sebastian Pasquali	4+2	0	0	0	1	0	7	0
22	DF	(Australia)	Kane Vidmar	3+3	1	0	0	0	0	6	1
23	MF	(Australia)	Rhys Bozinovski	22+4	5	3	0	1	0	30	5
24	FW	(Australia)	Michael Ruhs	3+14	4	3	0	0	0	20	4
29	DF	(Iraq)	Charbel Shamoon	13+4	0	0	0	0	0	17	0
30	DF	(Australia)	Dylan Leonard	24+1	1	3	0	0	0	28	1
32	MF	(Australia)	Angus Thurgate	25	2	3	0	1	0	28	2
33	GK	(Australia)	Matt Sutton	26	0	3	0	0	0	29	0
34	MF	(Australia)	James York	0+1	0	0	0	1	0	2	0
37	FW	(Australia)	Luke Vickery	1+11	1	0	0	0	0	12	1
44	MF	(Australia)	Jordan Lauton	1+16	1	0+1	0	0+1	0	19	1
47	DF	(New Zealand)	Luka Coveny	0	0	0	0	0+1	0	1	0
48	FW	(Australia)	Mark Leonard	0	0	0	0	0+1	0	1	0
77	MF	(Japan)	Riku Danzaki	23+3	4	3	0	1	1	30	5
Player(s) transferred out but featured this season
1	GK	(Australia)	Tom Heward-Belle	0	0	0	0	1	0	1	0

=== Disciplinary record ===
Includes all competitions. The list is sorted by squad number when total cards are equal. Players with no cards not included in the list.

As of match played 24 May 2025

Rank	No.	Pos.	Nat.	Name	A-League Men			A-League Men finals series			Australia Cup			Total							
Rank	No.	Pos.	Nat.	Name	Booked	(yellow card) (yellow-red card)	Sent off (straight red)	Booked	(yellow card) (yellow-red card)	Sent off (straight red)	Booked	(yellow card) (yellow-red card)	Sent off (straight red)	Booked	(yellow card) (yellow-red card)	Sent off (straight red)					
Rank	No.	Pos.	Nat.	Name	1	30	DF	(Australia)	Dylan Leonard	3	0	1	1	0	0	0	0	0	4	0	1
2	44	MF	(Australia)	Jordan Lauton	3	1	0	0	0	0	0	0	0	3	1	0					
3	32	MF	(Australia)	Angus Thurgate	7	0	0	1	0	0	1	0	0	9	0	0					
4	24	FW	(Australia)	Michael Ruhs	7	0	0	1	0	0	0	0	0	8	0	0					
5	23	MF	(Australia)	Rhys Bozinovski	5	0	0	1	0	0	0	0	0	6	0	0					
6	17	DF	(Australia)	Ben Garuccio	3	0	0	1	0	0	0	0	0	4	0	0					
7	6	DF	(Japan)	Tomoki Imai	3	0	0	0	0	0	0	0	0	3	0	0					
7	20	FW	(Australia)	Abel Walatee	3	0	0	0	0	0	0	0	0	3	0	0					
9	19	FW	(Australia)	Noah Botic	2	0	0	0	0	0	0	0	0	2	0	0					
9	77	MF	(Japan)	Riku Danzaki	1	0	0	1	0	0	0	0	0	2	0	0					
11	4	DF	(Australia)	James Donachie	1	0	0	0	0	0	0	0	0	1	0	0					
11	7	FW	(Australia)	Ramy Najjarine	0	0	0	0	0	0	0	0	0	1	0	0					
11	9	FW	(Japan)	Hiroshi Ibusuki	0	0	0	1	0	0	0	0	0	1	0	0					
11	10	FW	(Australia)	Matthew Grimaldi	1	0	0	0	0	0	0	0	0	1	0	0					
11	21	MF	(Australia)	Sebastian Pasquali	1	0	0	0	0	0	0	0	0	1	0	0					
11	22	DF	(Australia)	Kane Vidmar	1	0	0	0	0	0	0	0	0	1	0	0					
11	37	FW	(Australia)	Luke Vickery	1	0	0	0	0	0	0	0	0	1	0	0					
Total					42	1	1	8	0	0	1	0	0	51	1	1					

=== Clean sheets ===
Includes all competitions. The list is sorted by squad number when total clean sheets are equal. Numbers in parentheses represent games where both goalkeepers participated and both kept a clean sheet; the number in parentheses is awarded to the goalkeeper who was substituted on, whilst a full clean sheet is awarded to the goalkeeper who was on the field at the start of play. Goalkeepers with no clean sheets not included in the list.

As of match played 24 May 2025

Rank	No.	Nat.	Goalkeeper	A-League Men	A-League Men finals series	Australia Cup	Total
1	33	(Australia)	Matt Sutton	3	0	0	3
Total				5	0	0	5
