= Abel Walatee =

Australian soccer player

Personal information
- Full name: Abel Walatee
- Date of birth: 22 February 2004 (age 22)
- Place of birth: Ghana
- Position: Winger

Team information
- Current team: Sydney FC
- Number: 11

Youth career
- 2015–2017: North Sunshine Eagles
- Green Gully
- FFV NTC
- Melbourne City
- 2021–2023: Western United
- 2023: AB

Senior career*
Years	Team	Apps	(Gls)
2021–2023	Western United NPL	38	(6)
2024–2025	Western United NPL	23	(11)
2024–2025	Western United	25	(4)
2025–	Sydney FC	14	(1)

International career^{‡}
2025–	Australia U23	2	(0)
- * Club domestic league appearances and goals as of 26 April 2026 ‡ National team caps and goals as of 10 September 2025

Abel Walatee (/ˈæbəl ˈwɒləti/ AB-əl WOL-ə-tee; born 22 February 2004) is a professional soccer player who plays as a winger for Sydney FC. Born a Liberian refugee in Ghana, he represents Australia at youth level.

== Early life ==
Born in Ghana, Abel moved to Liberia at a young age to live with his grandmother. At age 8, he moved to Australia to live with his mother and father.

== Club career ==
=== Western United ===
On 16 April 2024, Walatee made his debut for Western United as an academy graduate, coming off the bench in a 3–3 draw with Adelaide United. His first goal for the club would come five days later, scoring seven minutes after coming off the bench against Perth Glory. At the end of the 2023–24 season, Walatee would sign a two-year professional contract with Western United.

Following the suspension of Western United's participation ahead of the 2025–26 season, all players – including Walatee – were released from their contracts in September 2025.

=== Sydney FC ===
Walatee signed a four-year contract with Sydney FC on 16 September 2025. His debut for the club was in the opening round of the 2025–26 A-League Men, coming off the bench in a 2–1 loss against Adelaide United. On 13 December 2025, Walatee would score five minutes into his starting debut, scoring the only goal in Sydney FC's 1–0 win over Perth Glory.

== Career statistics ==
As of match played 26 April 2026

Club	Season	League			Cup		Continental		Other		Total	
Club	Season	Division	Apps	Goals	Apps	Goals	Apps	Goals	Apps	Goals	Apps	Goals
Western United	2023–24	A-League Men	3	1	0	0	—		0	0	3	1
Western United	2024–25	A-League Men	22	3	1	0	—		0	0	23	3
Western United	2025–26	A-League Men	—		1	0	—		0	0	1	0
Western United	Total		25	4	2	0	0	0	0	0	27	4
Sydney FC	2025–26	A-League Men	14	1	0	0	—		0	0	14	1
Career total			39	5	2	0	0	0	0	0	41	5
