= Ramy Najjarine =

Footballer (born 2000)

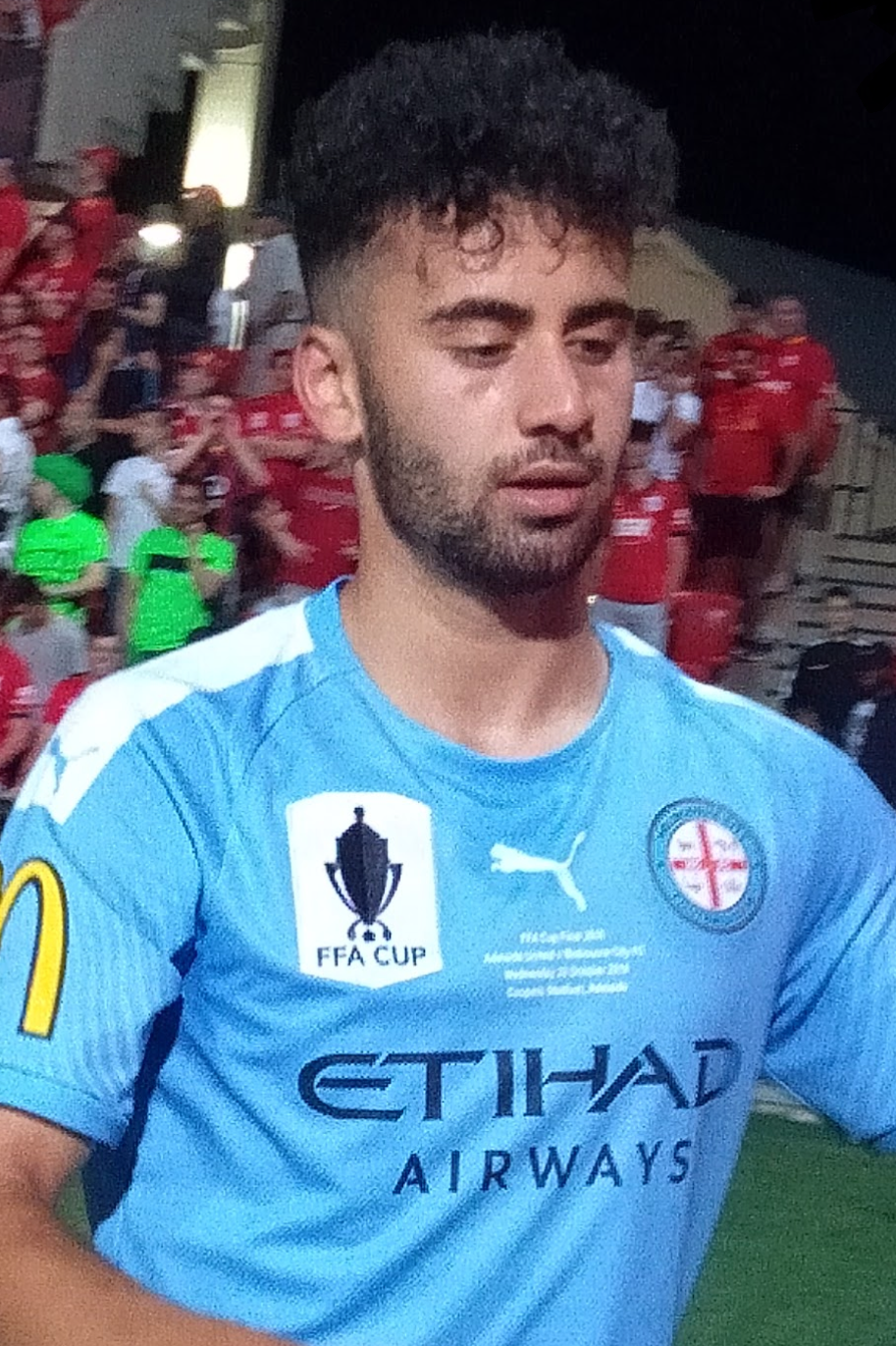
- Najjarine with Melbourne City in 2019

Personal information
- Full name: Ramy Najjarine
- Date of birth: 23 April 2000 (age 26)
- Place of birth: Liverpool, New South Wales, Australia
- Height: 1.76 m (5 ft 9 in)
- Positions: Attacking midfielder; winger

Team information
- Current team: El Qanah
- Number: 80

Youth career
- Mounties Wanderers
- 2013–2016: FNSW NTC
- 2016–2017: Western Sydney Wanderers

Senior career*
| Years | Team | Apps | (Gls) |
| 2016–2017 | Western Sydney Wanderers Youth | 20 | (3) |
| 2018–2019 | Melbourne City Youth | 25 | (20) |
| 2018–2021 | Melbourne City | 22 | (1) |
| 2020–2021 | → Newcastle Jets (loan) | 15 | (0) |
| 2021–2023 | Western Sydney Wanderers | 33 | (3) |
| 2023–2025 | Western United | 33 | (1) |
| 2025–2026 | Wellington Phoenix | 24 | (2) |
| 2026– | El Qanah | 0 | (0) |

International career^{‡}
| 2015–2016 | Australia U16 | 8 | (3) |
| 2017–2018 | Australia U19 | 5 | (3) |
| 2020–2022 | Australia U23 | 10 | (2) |
| 2025 | Lebanon | 1 | (0) |
Medal record
Men's football
Representing Australia
AFC U-23 Asian Cup
| Third place | 2020 Thailand | U-23 Team |
AFF U-16 Youth Championship
| Third place | 2015 Cambodia | U-17 Team |
- * Club domestic league appearances and goals as of 24 April 2026 ‡ National team caps and goals as of 15:53, 8 September 2025 (UTC)

Ramy Najjarine (Arabic: رامي نجارين, pronounced [ˈraːmi nædʒˈʒaːriːn]; born 23 April 2000) is a professional footballer who plays as an attacking midfielder or winger for Egyptian Premier League club El Qanah. Born in Australia, he has played for the Lebanon national team.

== Club career ==
=== Western City Wanderers ===
Najjarine began his youth career with Mounties Wanderers, before joining the Football NSW Institute, playing in the U16 NPL 1 NSW in 2014. In 2015, he entered the Western Sydney Wanderers's National Youth League squad as a train-on player. The following year, after scoring three goals in four matches for the club's under-20 side in the 2016 NPL 2 NSW, he was promoted to the first team.

=== Melbourne City ===
On 18 July 2017, Najjarine signed his first professional contract with Melbourne City, a three-year scholarship deal. He made his A-League debut in November 2018 as a substitute in a 2–0 loss to Brisbane Roar in Round 5 of the 2018–19 season. Later that season, he scored his first league goal in a 5–0 victory against Central Coast Mariners in Round 27. He finished his first professional season with one goal in 13 appearances for City.

On 17 October 2019, his contract was extended until the end of the 2021–22 season. He made nine appearances during the 2019–20 season. In October 2020, he joined Newcastle Jets on loan for the 2020–21 campaign, making 15 appearances.

=== Return to Western Sydney Wanderers ===
Najjarine rejoined Western Sydney Wanderers on 30 June 2021, having previously played in their academy system. He scored his first senior goal for the club on 16 March 2022 in a 2–1 away win against Adelaide United.

He made 33 appearances and scored three goals before departing the club by mutual agreement on 7 February 2023, midway through the 2022–23 season.

=== Western United ===
On the same day his departure from Western Sydney was confirmed, Najjarine was announced as a new signing for Western United. Across two seasons with the club, he made 33 appearances, scoring once and contributing three assists. He left the club on 4 July 2025 following the expiration of his contract.

=== Wellington Phoenix ===
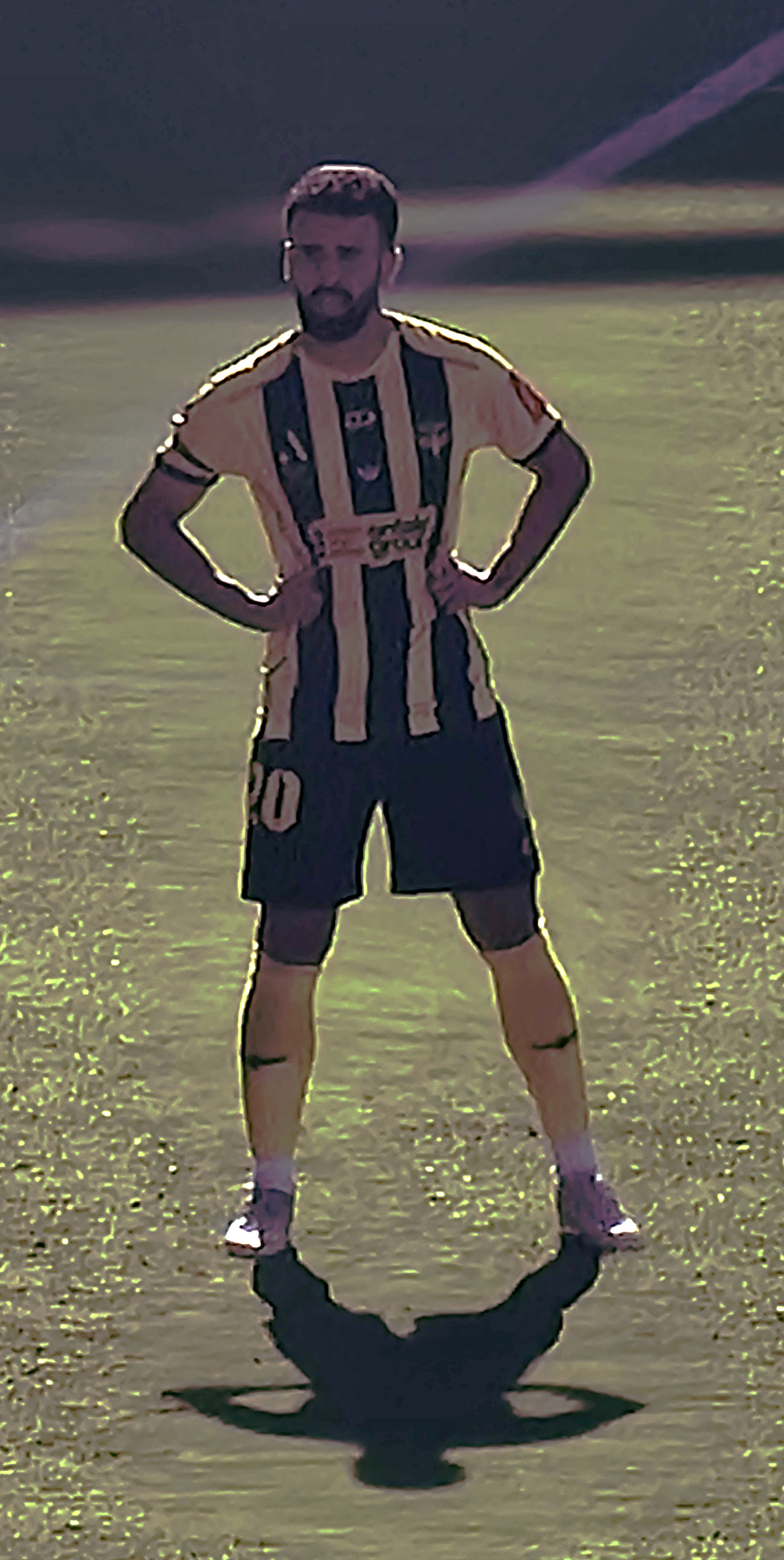
Najjarine playing for the Wellington Phoenix in 2025.

On 15 September 2025, deadline day, Wellington Phoenix signed Najjarine on a one-year contract. Najjarine made his club debut for the Phoenix on 18 October 2025, in a 2–2 draw away to Perth Glory. He scored two goals in 26 games throughout the 2025–26 season.

=== El Qanah ===
In July 2026, Najjarine joined newly promoted Egyptian Premier League side El Qanah on a free transfer for two seasons.

== International career ==
Najjarine represented Australia at under-16, under-18, and under-23 levels, and was part of the Olyroos squad that won bronze at the 2020 AFC U-23 Championship.

Eligible to represent Lebanon through his heritage, he received his first senior call-up to the Lebanon national team from coach Miodrag Radulović ahead of an unofficial (Note: The match was not considered an official international fixture, as it was played in two 35-minute halves (70 minutes in total).) friendly against Qatar on 24 August, where he assisted Khoder Kaddour's decisive goal in a 1–0 victory. He went on to make his official debut on 8 September 2025, in a 0–0 friendly draw against Indonesia. However, he had yet to receive FIFA clearance to participate in Lebanon's 2027 Asian Cup qualification matches against Bhutan the following month, despite having regained his Lebanese citizenship and submitted the required documents.

== Personal life ==
Najjarine was born in Liverpool, New South Wales, Australia. He is of Lebanese descent, and has a younger brother, Zane, who is also a footballer.

== Career statistics ==
=== Club ===
As of match played 24 April 2026

Appearances and goals by club, season and competition
| Club | Season | League | | | National cup (Note: Includes Australia Cup, Egypt Cup) | | Total | |
| Club | Season | Division | Apps | Goals | Apps | Goals | Apps | Goals |
|---|---|---|---|---|---|---|---|---|
| Western Sydney Wanderers Youth | 2016 | NPL 2 NSW | 18 | 2 | — | | 18 | 2 |
| Western Sydney Wanderers Youth | 2017 | NPL 2 NSW | 2 | 1 | — | | 2 | 1 |
| Western Sydney Wanderers Youth | Total | | 20 | 3 | 0 | 0 | 20 | 3 |
| Melbourne City Youth | 2018 | NPL 2 East VIC | 8 | 4 | — | | 8 | 4 |
| Melbourne City Youth | 2019 | NPL 2 East VIC | 17 | 16 | — | | 17 | 16 |
| Melbourne City Youth | Total | | 25 | 20 | 0 | 0 | 25 | 20 |
| Melbourne City | 2017–18 | A-League | 0 | 0 | 0 | 0 | 0 | 0 |
| Melbourne City | 2018–19 | A-League | 13 | 1 | 0 | 0 | 13 | 1 |
| Melbourne City | 2019–20 | A-League | 9 | 0 | 3 | 0 | 12 | 0 |
| Melbourne City | Total | | 22 | 1 | 3 | 0 | 25 | 1 |
| Newcastle Jets (loan) | 2020–21 | A-League | 15 | 0 | — | | 15 | 0 |
| Western Sydney Wanderers | 2021–22 | A-League | 22 | 2 | 1 | 0 | 23 | 2 |
| Western Sydney Wanderers | 2022–23 | A-League | 11 | 1 | 1 | 0 | 12 | 1 |
| Western Sydney Wanderers | Total | | 33 | 3 | 2 | 0 | 35 | 3 |
| Western United | 2022–23 | A-League | 1 | 0 | — | | 1 | 0 |
| Western United | 2023–24 | A-League | 13 | 0 | 1 | 0 | 14 | 0 |
| Western United | 2024–25 | A-League | 19 | 1 | — | | 19 | 1 |
| Western United | Total | | 33 | 1 | 1 | 0 | 34 | 1 |
| Wellington Phoenix | 2025–26 | A-League | 24 | 2 | — | | 24 | 2 |
| El Qanah | 2026–27 | Egyptian Premier League | 0 | 0 | 0 | 0 | 0 | 0 |
| Career total | | | 172 | 30 | 6 | 0 | 178 | 30 |

=== International ===
As of match played 8 September 2025

Appearances and goals by national team and year
| National team | Year | Apps | Goals |
|---|---|---|---|
| Lebanon | 2025 | 1 | 0 |
| Total | | 1 | 0 |

== Honours ==
Melbourne City

- FFA Cup runner-up: 2019

Australia U16

- AFF U-16 Youth Championship third place: 2015

Australia U23

- AFC U-23 Asian Cup third place: 2020

== See also ==
- List of Lebanon international footballers born outside Lebanon
