= Lucas Beniermann =

Personal information
- Date of birth: 7 August 1990 (age 36)
- Place of birth: Nordhorn, Germany

Team information
- Current team: SV Meppen (manager)

Managerial career
- Years: Team
- 2024–: SV Meppen

Lucas Beniermann (born 7 August 1990) is a German professional football manager, who is currently the manager of 3. Liga club SV Meppen.

== Managerial career ==
Beniermann was born in Nordhorn, Germany. He held youth coaching roles at Olympia Uelsen and JSG ASC/Uelsen before becoming a youth coach at SV Meppen in 2019. He was appointed as head coach of the first team in August 2024, following the sacking of Adrian Alipour, and after nine wins from the first 18 Regionalliga Nord matches as manager, his contract was extended in February 2025.

In his first full season as manager of SV Meppen, he won promotion to the 3. Liga as champions of the Regionalliga Nord. He agreed a contract extension in September 2026.
