= Luis Sprekelmeyer =

German footballer (born 2002)

Personal information
- Date of birth: 15 April 2002 (age 24)
- Height: 1.86 m (6 ft 1 in)
- Position: Centre-back

Team information
- Current team: SV Meppen
- Number: 19

Youth career
- –2013: BSV Brochterbeck
- 2013–2021: VfL Osnabrück

Senior career*
Years	Team	Apps	(Gls)
2021–2023	VfL Osnabrück	1	(0)
2022	→ Sportfreunde Lotte (loan)	8	(0)
2022–2023	→ SV Lippstadt (loan)	32	(1)
2023–	SV Meppen	78	(7)
- * Club domestic league appearances and goals as of 20 June 2026

Luis Sprekelmeyer (born 15 April 2002) is a German footballer who plays as a centre-back for SV Meppen.

== Club career ==
On 31 January 2022, Sprekelmeyer joined Sportfreunde Lotte on loan.
