= Stefan Kleineheismann =

German footballer

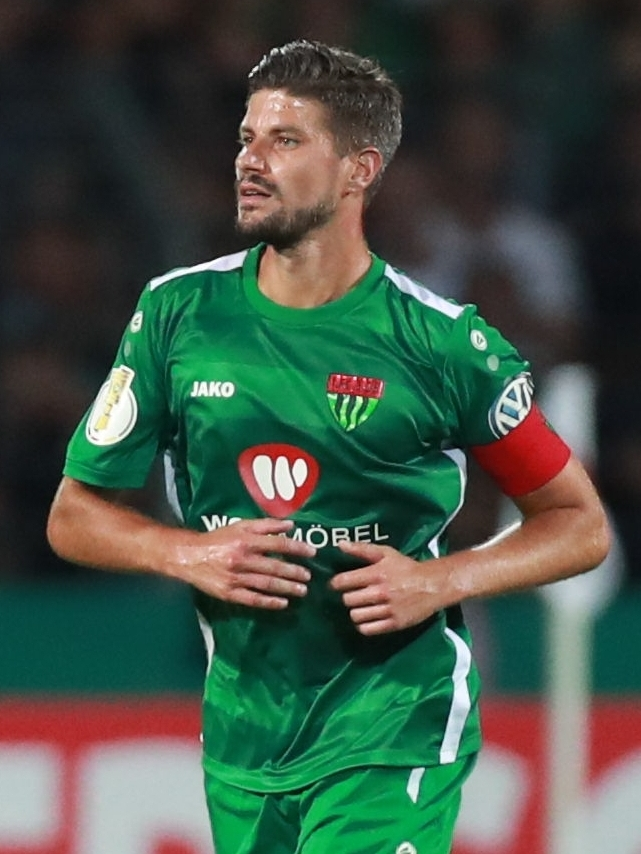
- Kleineheismann in 2018

Personal information
- Date of birth: 8 February 1988 (age 38)
- Place of birth: Fürth, West Germany
- Height: 1.87 m (6 ft 2 in)
- Position: Defender

Team information
- Current team: TSG Hoffenheim II (head coach)

Youth career
- 1992–2001: FSV Stadeln
- 2001–2006: Greuther Fürth

Senior career*
Years	Team	Apps	(Gls)
2006–2011	Greuther Fürth II	118	(3)
2011–2013	Kickers Offenbach	63	(3)
2013–2015	Rot-Weiß Erfurt	61	(0)
2015–2018	Hallescher FC	99	(3)
2018–2020	1. FC Schweinfurt	44	(2)
Total		385	(11)

Managerial career
- 2022: Greuther Fürth
- 2025–: TSG Hoffenheim II
- * Club domestic league appearances and goals

Stefan Kleineheismann (born 8 February 1988) is a German football manager and former footballer who is the current head coach of 3. Liga club TSG Hoffenheim II.

In 2020, an injury forced him into retirement and he became an assistant coach of Greuther Fürth, and in October 2022 he was interim coach for one game.
