= SV Meppen =

German football club

- Full name: Sportverein Meppen 1912 e.V.
- Nickname: SVM
- Founded: 29 November 1912; 113 years ago
- Ground: Hänsch-Arena
- Capacity: 13,241
- Chairman: Andreas Kremer
- Manager: Lucas Beniermann
- League: 3. Liga
- 2025–26: Regionalliga Nord, 1st of 18 (promoted)
Home colours	Away colours

SV Meppen is a German association football club playing in Meppen, Lower Saxony. The club was founded on 29 November 1912 as Amisia Meppen and joined Männer-Turnverein Meppen on 8 February 1920 to form TuS Meppen 1912. The football branch left TuS Meppen in 1921 to create a separate club called Sport Verein Meppen 1912 e.V.. SV Meppen spent a total of 11 years in the 2. Bundesliga.

== History ==
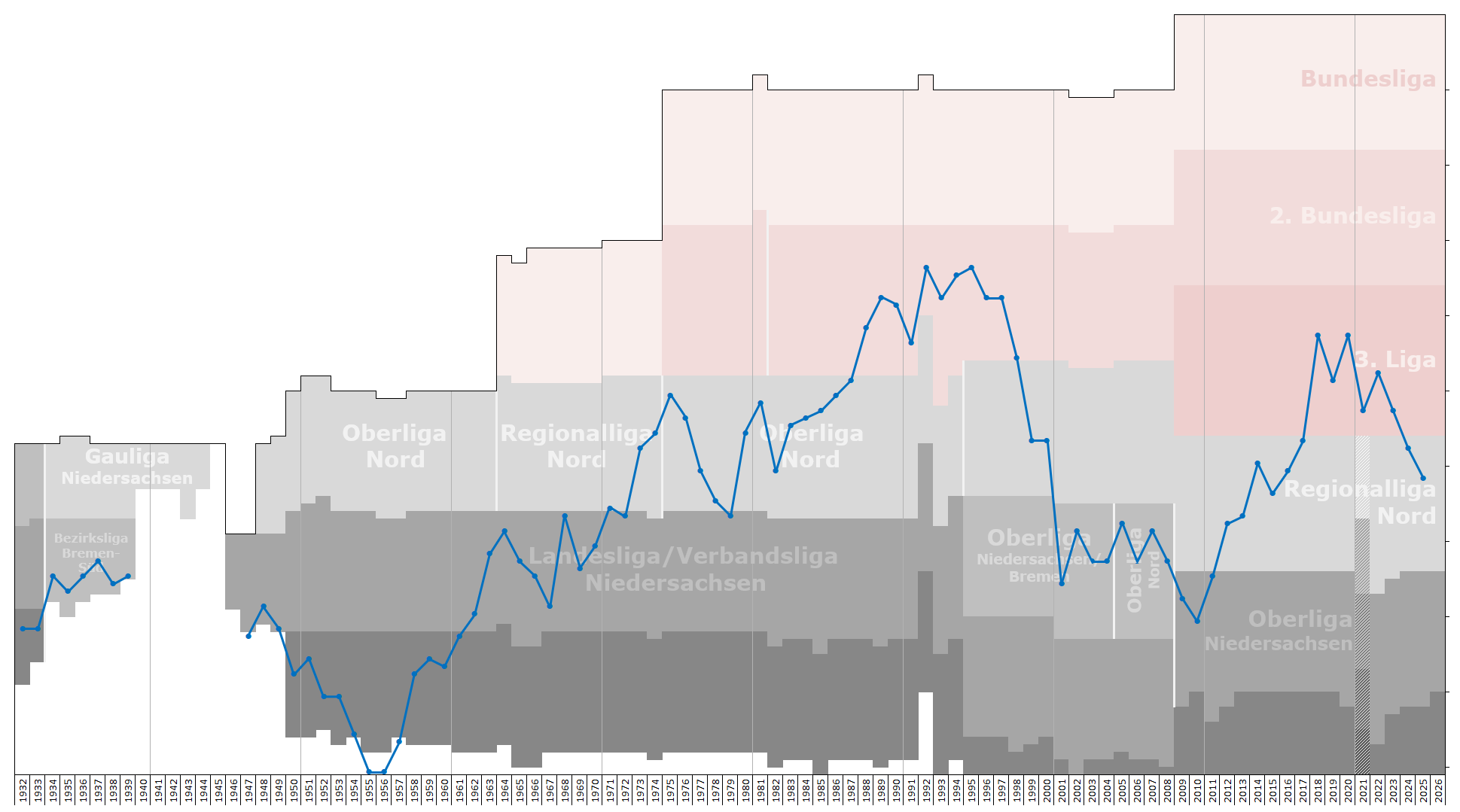
Historical chart of SV Meppen's league performance

Meppen have had a relatively quiet history playing in III and IV level circles, winning their first title of any sort when they claimed the Amateurliga Lower Saxony (IV) championship in 1961. They claimed a second title there in 1968 and then qualified for the Regionalliga Nord (II) in 1972. After league re-structuring in 1974 the team played in the Oberliga Nord (III) where they won the championship in 1987 and then emerged out the promotion playoffs to join the 2. Bundesliga.

Generally, the side ended up in mid-table with their best finishes being 7th in 1994 and 6th in 1995. Meppen played their way into the final eight of the 1997 DFB-Pokal competition on the strength of a memorable 6–1 victory over Eintracht Frankfurt. The club's eleven-year run on the professional circuit ended in 1998 and they began a slide that landed them in the Oberliga Nord (V), where played half a dozen seasons burdened by ongoing financial problems. During the new century Meppen dropped to the Niedersachsenliga (5th division). They won the championship in 2011 and advanced to the Regionalliga Nord, which they won in 2017 to return to the 3. Liga.

== Honours ==
- Amateurliga Niedersachsen (III)
  - Champions: 1968
- Oberliga Nord (III)
  - Champions: 1987
- Regionalliga Nord (IV)
  - Champions: 2017
- Niedersachsenliga (V)
  - Champions: 2011
- Lower Saxony Cup
  - Winners: 1999, 2021, 2024
  - Runners-up: 2015, 2019, 2022

== Players ==
=== Current squad ===
As of 25 July 2026

Note: Flags indicate national team as defined under FIFA eligibility rules; some limited exceptions apply. Players may hold more than one non-FIFA nationality.

No.	Pos.	Nation	Player
1	GK	GER	Noah Oberbeck
2	DF	GER	Dominique Domröse
3	DF	GER	Tobias Mißner
4	MF	GER	Jona Borsum (on loan from Eintracht Braunschweig)
5	MF	GER	Jonas Fedl (captain)
6	MF	GER	Ersin Zehir
7	FW	GER	Oliver Schmitt
8	MF	GER	Erik Zenga
9	FW	GER	Cyrill Akono
10	MF	GER	Kasra Ghawilu
11	FW	GER	Simon Engelmann
13	FW	GER	Richard Meier (on loan from Bayern Munich II)
14	MF	GER	Thorben Deters

No.	Pos.	Nation	Player
17	FW	GER	Jannic Ehlers
19	DF	GER	Luis Sprekelmeyer
20	DF	TOG	Nikell Touglo
22	MF	GER	Mika Herrmann
23	MF	GER	Niclas Wessels
24	MF	GER	Henrik Wittrock
28	DF	GER	Jonas Goldenstein
30	GK	GER	Timo Schmitz
31	MF	GER	Luca Prasse (on loan from Holstein Kiel)
33	DF	BIH	Stefan Rankić
39	DF	GER	Florian Bähr
40	MF	GER	Niclas Nadj
44	GK	GER	Julius Pünt

== Stadium ==
The Hänsch-Arena is located in northern Meppen on Lathener Straße. Construction on the site was finished in 1924 and the stadium was named after Paul von Hindenburg two years later. In 1992 the stadium was renamed "Emslandstadion". A sponsorship deal in 2014 currently has the stadium branded as "Hänsch-Arena". The stadium's largest ever crowd of 18,000 spectators watched SV Meppen play a 1982 friendly against a Barcelona team that included Diego Maradona. Today the stadium has a capacity of 13,241.

== Literature ==
- Hans Vinke: Die Meppen-Story, Geschichte eines Fußball-Phänomens, 1997, ISBN 3-927099-56-2
