= Lúkas Petersson =

Icelandic footballer (born 2003)

Personal information
- Full name: Lúkas Jóhannes Blöndal Petersson
- Date of birth: 9 February 2004 (age 22)
- Place of birth: Düsseldorf, Germany
- Height: 1.93 m (6 ft 4 in)
- Position: Goalkeeper

Team information
- Current team: TSG Hoffenheim
- Number: 36

Senior career*
Years	Team	Apps	(Gls)
2023–	TSG Hoffenheim II	64	(0)
2024–	TSG Hoffenheim	0	(0)

International career^{‡}
2019	Iceland U17	2	(0)
2022–2023	Iceland U19	10	(0)
2023–	Iceland U21	6	(0)
- * Club domestic league appearances and goals as of 23 May 2026 ‡ National team caps and goals as of 10 September 2024

Lúkas Jóhannes Blöndal Petersson (born 9 February 2004) is a footballer who plays as a goalkeeper for Bundesliga club TSG Hoffenheim. Born in Germany, he is a youth international for Iceland.

== Early life ==
Lúkas grew up in Handewitt, Germany. Both his father Alexander Petersson and mother Eivor Pála Blöndal were international handball players for Iceland. He is of Latvian and Baltic German descent through his father, and Icelandic descent through his mother.

== Club career ==
On 17 May 2024, he was announced as Hoffenheim's first-team goalkeeper for the 2024–25 season. He also extended his contract until 2027 at the time.

== International career ==
He represented Iceland internationally at 2025 UEFA European Under-21 Championship qualification. Lúkas's has been described as having "a large wingspan and a strong presence in the box;" he "is not afraid to come out".
