= Matthias Mink =

German footballer

Personal information
- Date of birth: 31 July 1967
- Place of birth: Villingen, West Germany
- Height: 1.81 m (5 ft 11 in)
- Position: Defender

Team information
- Current team: Fortuna Köln (manager)

Senior career*
Years	Team	Apps	(Gls)
1985–1988	DJK Villingen		
1989–1992	FV Donaueschingen		
1992–1999	Fortuna Köln		

Managerial career
- 2007–2011: Fortuna Köln
- 2011–2012: Bayer Leverkusen II
- 2014–2016: KSV Hessen Kassel
- 2016–2019: TSV Steinbach Haiger
- 2020–2021: FC Homburg
- 2022: Fortuna Köln II
- 2024–: Fortuna Köln
- * Club domestic league appearances and goals

Matthias Mink (born 31 July 1967) is a German manager and former professional footballer who played as a defender. He is currently in charge of Fortuna Köln.

He played in the 2. Bundesliga for Fortuna Köln, which was even his first job as manager. After working for several clubs, he came back to Fortuna to manage their reserve team in 2022. Since beginning of 2024, he is manager of Fortuna Köln.

== Honours ==
=== Managerial ===
Fortuna Köln

- Regionalliga West: 2025–26
