= List of Western United FC seasons =

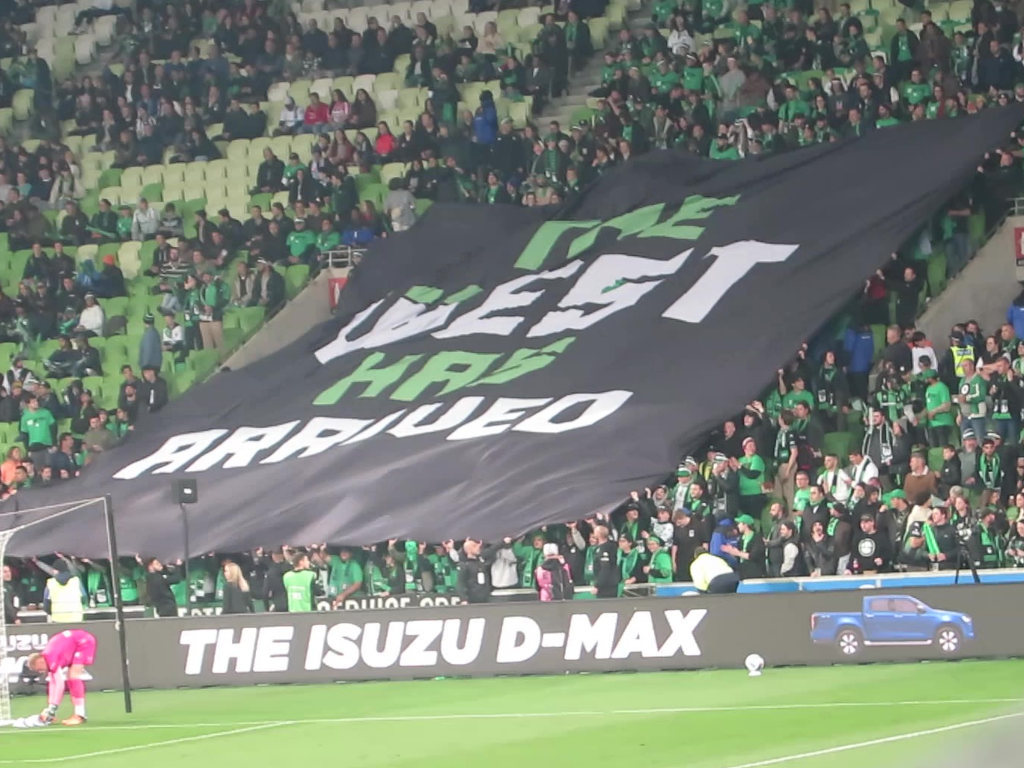
Western United fans holding up a banner reading "The West Has Arrived" at the 2022 A-League Men Grand Final

Western United Football Club is an Australian professional association football club based in Truganina, Melbourne. The club was formed in 2017 as Western Melbourne before it was shortly renamed to Western United. They became the third Victorian member admitted into the A-League in 2019.

Western United made the A-League Finals in their first season. The club placed 5th and beat Brisbane Roar 1–0 in and losing 2–0 in the semi final against city rivals, Melbourne City. In the 2021–22 A League season United placed 3rd place and won the Grand Final after beating Melbourne City 2–0, thanks to a second minute own goal by Nuno Reis and a thirtieth minute girl by Aleksandar Prijović. this was Western United's first trophy won.

== Key ==
Key to league competitions:

- A-League Men (A-League/A-League Men) – Australia's top football league, established in 2004

Key to colours and symbols:

1st or W	Winners
2nd or RU	Runners-up
3rd	Third
♦	Top scorer in division

Key to league record:

- Season = The year and article of the season
- Pos = Final position
- Pld = Games played
- W = Games won
- D = Games drawn
- L = Games lost
- GF = Goals scored
- GA = Goals against
- Pts = Points

Key to cup record:

- En-dash (–) = Western United did not participate
- DNQ = The club did not qualify for a competition.
- Group = Group stage
- R32 = Round of 32
- R16 = Round of 16
- QF = Quarter-finals
- SF = Semi-finals
- RU = Runners-up
- W = Winners

== Seasons ==
Results of league and cup competitions by season
Season	Division	Pld	W	D	L	GF	GA	Pts	Pos	Finals	Australia Cup	Top goalscorer(s) (Note: Includes goals scored in the A-League Men, Australia Cup and AFC Champions League.)	
Season	League									Finals	Australia Cup	Name(s)	Goals
2019–20	A-League	26	12	3	11	46	37	39	5th	SF	—	Besart Berisha	19
2020–21	A-League	26	8	4	14	30	47	28	10th	DNQ	—	Besart Berisha	7
2021–22	A-League Men	26	13	6	7	40	30	45	3rd	W	R32	Aleksandar Prijovic	9
2022–23	A-League Men	26	9	5	12	34	47	32	7th	DNQ	R16	Noah Botic	6
2023–24	A-League Men	27	7	5	15	36	55	26	11th	DNQ	QF	Daniel Penha	7
2024–25	A-League Men	26	14	5	7	55	37	47	3rd	SF	PO	Noah Botic	16
