= 2021–22 Canberra United FC (women) season =

Canberra United FC
2021–22 season
- Manager: Vicki Linton
- Stadium: Viking Park
- A-League Women: 7th of 10

The 2021–22 Canberra United FC season was the club's fourteenth season in the A-League Women, the premier competition for women's football originally known as the W-League. The club's manager for the season was Vicki Linton, and the team played their home games at Viking Park.

== Players ==
=== Squad information ===
As of 30 November 2021

Note: Flags indicate national team as defined under FIFA eligibility rules; some limited exceptions apply. Players may hold more than one non-FIFA nationality.

No.	Pos.	Nation	Player
1	GK	AUS	Keeley Richards
2	DF	AUS	Emma Ilijoski
3	DF	AUS	Mikayla Vidmar
5	DF	AUS	Lauren Keir
6	MF	AUS	Laura Hughes
7	MF	USA	Chelsee Washington (on loan from Orlando Pride)
8	MF	FRA	Margot Robinne
9	MF	AUS	Holly Caspers
10	MF	AUS	Grace Maher (vice-captain)
11	MF	AUS	Chloe Middleton
12	FW	AUS	Allira Toby

No.	Pos.	Nation	Player
13	MF	AUS	Alexia Karrys-Stahl
14	FW	AUS	Ashleigh Sykes
16	DF	AUS	Karly Roestbakken (on loan from LSK Kvinner)
17	MF	AUS	Sasha Grove (scholarship)
18	GK	AUS	Chloe Lincoln (scholarship)
19	FW	AUS	Nickoletta Flannery
20	FW	AUS	Hayley Taylor-Young
21	GK	AUS	Beth Mason-Jones
22	GK	AUS	Cristina Esposito
23	FW	AUS	Michelle Heyman (captain)
25	DF	CAN	Ally Haran

=== Transfers in ===
No.	Pos.	Nat.	Name	Age	Moving from	Type	Transfer window	Ends	Transfer fee	Source
	FW	(Australia)	Allira Toby	27	Sydney FC	Transfer	Pre-season			
	MF	(France)	Margot Robinne	30	Melbourne City FC	Transfer	Pre-season			
	MF	(Australia)	Holly Caspers	21	(Australia) Sydney University	Transfer	Pre-season			
	MF	(Australia)	Chloe Middleton	25	Western Sydney Wanderers	Transfer	Pre-season			
	GK	(Australia)	Beth Mason-Jones	23	(Australia) Alamein United	Transfer	Pre-season			
	MF	(Australia)	Alexia Karrys-Stahl	21	(Australia) Sydney Olympic	Transfer	Pre-season			
	DF	(Australia)	Mikayla Vidmar	19	(Australia) Adelaide City	Transfer	Pre-season			
	DF	(Canada)	Ally Haran	25	(United States) Orlando Pride	Transfer	Pre-season			
	MF	(United States)	Chelsee Washington	23	(United States) Orlando Pride	Loan	Pre-season			

=== Transfers out ===
No.	Pos.	Nat.	Name	Age	Moving to	Type	Transfer window	Transfer fee	Source
9	FW	(Australia)	Demi Koulizakis	23	Perth Glory	Transfer	Pre-season		
4	DF	(United States)	Kendall Fletcher	36	(United States) North Carolina Courage	Transfer	Pre-season		
13	FW	(New Zealand)	Paige Satchell	23	Sydney FC	Transfer	Pre-season		
6	MF	(Australia)	Bianca Galic	21	Western Sydney Wanderers	Transfer	Pre-season		
3	DF	(Australia)	Clare Hunt	22	Western Sydney Wanderers	Transfer	Pre-season		
15	DF	(Australia)	Jessika Nash	16	Sydney FC	Transfer	Pre-season		
29	GK	(United States)	Chantel Jones	33	Retired	Transfer	Pre-season		
22	GK	(Australia)	Sally James	18	Melbourne City FC	Transfer	Pre-season		
15	MF	(Australia)	Ashlie Crofts	23	Western Sydney Wanderers	Transfer	Pre-season		
14	DF	(Australia)	Jessie Rasschaert	34	Brisbane Roar	Transfer	Pre-season		

== W-League ==
=== League table ===
Pos	Team	Pld	W	D	L	GF	GA	GD	Pts	Qualification
1	Sydney FC	14	11	2	1	36	6	+30	35	Qualification to Finals series
2	Melbourne City	14	11	0	3	29	11	+18	33	Qualification to Finals series
3	Adelaide United	14	9	0	5	33	18	+15	27	Qualification to Finals series
4	Melbourne Victory (C)	14	7	3	4	26	22	+4	24	Qualification to Finals series
5	Perth Glory	14	7	3	4	20	23	−3	24	
6	Brisbane Roar	14	5	2	7	29	30	−1	17	
7	Canberra United	14	2	7	5	24	29	−5	13	
8	Newcastle Jets	14	2	4	8	15	30	−15	10	
9	Western Sydney Wanderers	14	1	4	9	7	27	−20	7	
10	Wellington Phoenix	14	2	1	11	13	36	−23	7	

Source: A-Leagues
Rules for classification: 1) points; 2) goal difference; 3) number of goals scored.
(C) Champions

=== Matches ===
Win Draw Loss

- All times are in AEDT

3 December 2021 1	Canberra United	0–1	Melbourne City	Canberra
		Report	McNamara 80'	Stadium: Viking Park; Attendance: 1,237; Referee: Georgia Ghirardello

12 December 2021 2	Adelaide United	2–1	Canberra United	Adelaide
	Sasaki 23'; Condon 90+1'	Report	Heyman 16'	Stadium: Marden Sports Complex; Attendance: 780; Referee: Rebecca Mackie

23 December 2021 4	Canberra United	3–3	Brisbane Roar	Canberra
19:45	Heyman 10'; Maher 87'; Caspers 90+3'	Report	Roestbakken 23' (o.g.); Connors 38'; Margraf 64'	Stadium: Viking Park; Referee: Rachael Mitchenson

5 January 2022 3	Perth Glory	0–0	Canberra United	Sydney
17:05		Report		Stadium: Wanderers Football Park; Attendance: 106; Referee: Georgia Ghirardello

8 January 2022 6	Canberra United	1–3	Adelaide United	Canberra
17:05	Sykes 57'	Report	Holmes 9'; Dawber 40'; Worts 77'	Stadium: Viking Park; Attendance: 910; Referee: Kate Jacewicz

15 January 2022 7	Sydney FC	6–0	Canberra United	Sydney
17:05	Rojas 28' (pen.), 41', 64'; Green 62'; Ibini 83'; Lowe 88'	Report		Stadium: Netstrata Jubilee Stadium; Attendance: 1,319; Referee: Isabella Blaess

30 January 2022 9	Newcastle Jets	3–3	Canberra United	Newcastle
16:05	Markussen 1'; Harding 51'; Franco 63'	Report	Sykes 18', 60'; Toby 62'	Stadium: McDonald Jones Stadium; Attendance: 2,546; Referee: Georgia Ghirardello

5 February 2022 10	Canberra United	3–3	Perth Glory	Canberra
17:05	Maher 6' (pen.); Washington 79'; Keir 84'	Report	Hintzen 44', 70'; Anton 64'	Stadium: Viking Park; Attendance: 1,125; Referee: Isabella Blaess

11 February 2022 11	Canberra United	0–3	Wellington Phoenix	Canberra
19:45		Report	Knott 41'; Jale 50'; Haran 62' (o.g.)	Stadium: Viking Park; Attendance: 957; Referee: Rebecca Mackie

15 February 2022 5	Western Sydney Wanderers	0–5	Canberra United	Sydney
17:25		Report	Heyman 22'; Washington 34'; Middleton 66'; Robinne 85', 90'	Stadium: Blacktown Football Park; Attendance: 381; Referee: Caitlin Williams

22 February 2022 8	Canberra United	2–2	Melbourne Victory	Canberra
17:25	Washington 41'; Heyman 45+3'	Report	Chidiac 81'; Eliadis 90+1'	Stadium: Viking Park; Attendance: 1,089; Referee: Rachael Mitchenson

25 February 2022 13	Canberra United	3–0	Newcastle Jets	Canberra
17:25	Toby 11'; Heyman 29', 45+1'	Report		Stadium: Viking Park; Attendance: 753; Referee: Georgia Ghirardello

4 March 2022 14	Melbourne Victory	0–0	Canberra United	Melbourne
17:05		Report		Stadium: AAMI Park; Attendance: 1,091; Referee: Rebecca Mackie

10 March 2022 12	Brisbane Roar	3–3	Canberra United	Brisbane
18:05	Crummer 13'; Norrie 64'; McElligott 90'	Report	Heyman 67', 72', 88'	Stadium: James Drysdale Reserve 1 Attendance: 875; Referee: Rebecca Mackie

=== Results summary ===
Overall								Home						Away					
Pld	W	D	L	GF	GA	GD	Pts	W	D	L	GF	GA	GD	W	D	L	GF	GA	GD
3	0	1	2	4	6	−2	1	0	1	1	3	4	−1	0	0	1	1	2	−1

Last updated: 23 December 2021.
Source: Competitive Matches

==== Results by round ====
Round	1	2	4	3	6	7	9	10	11	5	8	13	14	12
Ground	H	A	H	A	H	A	A	H	H	A	H	H	A	A
Result	L	L	D	D	L	L	D	D	L	W	D	W	D	D
Position	8	9	8	9	9	9	9	9	9	7	7	6	7	7
Points	0	0	1	2	2	2	3	4	4	7	8	11	12	13

Source: A-Leagues
A = Away; H = Home; W = Win; D = Draw; L = Loss
