= 2023–24 Western United FC season =

Western United
2023–24 season
- Chairman: Jason Sourasis
- Manager: John Aloisi
- Stadium: Wyndham Regional Football Facility; AAMI Park; Mars Stadium
- A-League Men: 11th
- A-League Men Finals: DNQ
- Australia Cup: Quarter-finals
- Top goalscorer: League: Daniel Penha (7); All: Daniel Penha (7)
- Highest home attendance: 6,265 vs. Melbourne City (7 January 2024); A-League Men
- Lowest home attendance: 2,043 vs. Wellington Phoenix (2 December 2023); A-League Men
- Average home league attendance: 3,274
- Biggest win: 4–0 vs. Edgeworth FC (A) (9 August 2023); Australia Cup
- Biggest defeat: 0–5 vs. Western Sydney Wanderers (A) (28 October 2023); A-League Men
- All statistics correct as of 28 April 2024.

The 2023–24 season was the fifth in the history of Western United Football Club.

== Players ==
=== First-team squad ===
Note: Flags indicate national team as defined under FIFA eligibility rules; some limited exceptions apply. Players may hold more than one non-FIFA nationality.

No.	Pos.	Nation	Player
1	GK	AUS	Tom Heward-Belle
4	DF	AUS	James Donachie
6	DF	JPN	Tomoki Imai (vice-captain)
7	FW	AUS	Ramy Najjarine
8	FW	AUS	Lachlan Wales
9	FW	AUS	Michael Ruhs
10	MF	AUS	Steven Lustica (vice-captain)
11	MF	BRA	Daniel Penha (on loan from Atlético Mineiro)
13	FW	AUS	Nikita Rukavytsya
17	DF	AUS	Ben Garuccio
19	DF	AUS	Josh Risdon (captain)
21	MF	AUS	Sebastian Pasquali

No.	Pos.	Nation	Player
22	DF	AUS	Kane Vidmar (scholarship)
24	DF	AUS	Connor O'Toole
27	DF	AUS	Jacob Tratt
32	MF	AUS	Angus Thurgate
33	GK	AUS	Matt Sutton
38	FW	AUS	Noah Botic
39	MF	AUS	Matthew Grimaldi
41	FW	AUS	Oliver Lavale (scholarship)
42	MF	AUS	Rhys Bozinovski
49	FW	AUS	Jake Najdovski
70	GK	AUS	Michael Vonja (scholarship)
77	MF	JPN	Riku Danzaki

== Transfers ==
=== Transfers in ===
No.	Position	Player	Transferred from	Type/fee	Contract length	Date	Ref.
32	MF	Angus Thurgate	Unattached	Free	3 years	17 May 2023	
1	GK	Tom Heward-Belle	Unattached	Free	2 years	14 June 2023	
33	GK	Matt Sutton	Unattached	Free	2 years	14 June 2023	
4	DF	James Donachie	Sydney FC	Free	2 years	4 July 2023	
22	DF	Kane Vidmar	Adelaide United NPL	Free	2 year scholarship	6 July 2023	
11	MF	(Brazil) Daniel Penha	(Brazil) Atlético Mineiro	Loan	1 year	19 July 2023	
77	MF	(Japan) Riku Danzaki	(Scotland) Motherwell	Free transfer	2 years	24 July 2023	
13	FW	Nikita Rukavytsya	Unattached	Free transfer	1 year	27 September 2023	

==== From youth squad ====
N	Pos.	Nat.	Name	Age	Notes
39	MF	(Australia)	Matthew Grimaldi	20	2 year scholarship contract
41	FW	(Australia)	Oliver Lavale	18	scholarship contract
70	GK	(Australia)	Michael Vonja	17	scholarship contract

=== Transfers out ===
No.	Position	Player	Transferred to	Type/fee	Date	Ref
44	DF	Nikolai Topor-Stanley	Retired		19 April 2023	
23	MF	(Italy) Alessandro Diamanti	Retired		24 April 2023	
1	GK	(England) Jamie Young	Unattached	End of contract	8 May 2023	
4	DF	(Switzerland) Léo Lacroix	Unattached	End of contract	8 May 2023	
7	MF	(Mali) Tongo Doumbia	Unattached	End of contract	8 May 2023	
14	MF	James Troisi	Unattached	End of contract	8 May 2023	
31	FW	Adisu Bayew	Unattached	End of contract	8 May 2023	
33	DF	Ben Collins	Unattached	End of contract	8 May 2023	
36	DF	Ajak Deu	Unattached	End of contract	8 May 2023	
37	GK	Ryan Scott	Unattached	End of contract	8 May 2023	
88	MF	Neil Kilkenny	Unattached	End of contract	8 May 2023	
5	MF	Dylan Pierias	Unattached	End of contract	16 May 2023	
11	FW	Connor Pain	(Saudi Arabia) Al-Orobah	Undisclosed	8 July 2023	
99	FW	(Serbia) Aleksandar Prijović	Unattached	Mutual contract termination	27 September 2023	

=== Contract extensions ===
No.	Name	Position	Duration	Date	Notes	Ref.
21	Sebastian Pasquali	Central midfielder	1 year	31 May 2023		
49	Jake Najdovski	Striker	2 years	22 September 2023	Contract extended from end of 2023–24 until end of 2025–26.	
6	(Japan) Tomoki Imai	Central defender	2 years	6 October 2023	Contract extended from end of 2023–24 until end of 2025–26.	
39	Matthew Grimaldi	Attacking midfielder	3 years	12 April 2024	New contract replacing previous contract until end of 2026–27.	

== Pre-season and friendlies ==
Win Draw Loss Fixtures

2 August 2023	Western United	3–1	Melbourne City	Melbourne
12:30 AEST	Danzaki 13'; Bisetto 95'; Najdovski 104'	Report	Jakoliš 31'	Stadium: The Hangar; Attendance: 0 (behind closed doors)
Note: Match was played over three 45-minute periods

23 August 2023	Melbourne City	1–0	Western United	Melbourne
AEST	Caputo 56'	Report		Stadium: Casey Fields; Attendance: 0 (behind closed doors)

2 September 2023	Brisbane Roar	3–1	Western United	Logan
12:30 AEST	O'Shea 21' (pen.); Hore 50'; Armiento 77' (pen.)	Report	Bisetto 44'	Stadium: Meakin Park

2 October 2023	Western United	2–1	Western Sydney Wanderers	Melbourne
	Thurgate; Penha	Report	Goal	Stadium: The Hangar; Attendance: 0 (behind closed doors)

12 October 2023	Adelaide United	0–0	Western United	Adelaide
		Report		Stadium: Coopers Stadium; Attendance: 0 (behind closed doors)

== Competitions ==
=== Overall record ===
Competition	First match	Last match	Starting round	Final position	Record							
Competition	First match	Last match	Starting round	Final position	Pld	W	D	L	GF	GA	GD	Win %
A-League Men	21 October 2023	28 April 2024	Matchday 1	11th	27	7	5	15	36	55	−19	25.93
Australia Cup	9 August 2023	17 September 2023	Round of 32	Quarter-finals	3	2	0	1	6	3	+3	66.67
Total					30	9	5	16	42	58	−16	30.00

Last updated: 28 April 2024
Source: Soccerway

=== A-League Men ===
==== League table ====
Pos	Team	Pld	W	D	L	GF	GA	GD	Pts	Qualification
8	Adelaide United	27	9	5	13	52	53	−1	32	
9	Brisbane Roar	27	8	6	13	42	55	−13	30	Qualification for 2024 Australia Cup play-offs
10	Newcastle Jets	27	6	10	11	39	47	−8	28	Qualification for 2024 Australia Cup play-offs
11	Western United	27	7	5	15	36	55	−19	26	Qualification for 2024 Australia Cup play-offs
12	Perth Glory	27	5	7	15	46	69	−23	22	Qualification for 2024 Australia Cup play-offs

Source: A-Leagues
Rules for classification: 1) points; 2) wins; 3) goal difference; 4) goals scored; 5) head-to-head results; 5a) head-to-head points; 5b) head-to-head goal difference; 6) Fair Play points; 7) away goal difference; 8) away goals per match; 9) home goal difference; 10) home goals per match; 11) toss of a coin in an event of a tie of two clubs.

==== Results summary ====
Away figures include Western United's 3–3 draw on neutral ground against Macarthur FC on 12 January 2024.

Overall								Home						Away					
Pld	W	D	L	GF	GA	GD	Pts	W	D	L	GF	GA	GD	W	D	L	GF	GA	GD
27	7	5	15	36	55	−19	26	4	3	6	18	20	−2	3	2	9	18	35	−17

Last updated: 28 April 2024.
Source: Ultimate A-League

==== Results by round ====
Round	1	2	3	4	5	6	7	8	9	10	11	27	14	15	16	17	12	18	19	20	21	22	23	24	13	25	26
Ground	A	A	A	H	H	H	A	H	A	A	H	N	H	H	A	H	A	A	H	A	H	A	H	H	H	A	H
Result	W	L	L	L	L	L	L	W	L	L	L	D	L	D	L	W	L	D	W	W	D	L	W	L	D	W	L
Position	3	7	9	11	12	12	12	11	12	12	12	12	12	12	12	12	12	12	12	12	12	12	11	11	11	11	11
Points	3	3	3	3	3	3	3	6	6	6	6	7	7	8	8	11	11	12	15	18	19	19	22	22	23	26	26

Updated to match(es) played on 28 April 2024. Source: Ultimate A-League
A = Away; H = Home; N = Neutral; W = Win; D = Draw; L = Loss

==== Matches ====
Win Draw Loss

21 October 2023 1	Melbourne City	1–2	Western United	Melbourne
17:30 AEDT	Arslan 62'	Report	Wales 60'; Botic 87' (pen.)	Stadium: AAMI Park; Attendance: 10,089; Referee: Jack Morgan

28 October 2023 2	Western Sydney Wanderers	5–0	Western United	Sydney
17:30 AEDT	Brook 6', 13'; Milanovic 34', 45+3'; Marcelo 39'	Report		Stadium: CommBank Stadium; Attendance: 8,098; Referee: Alex King

4 November 2023 3	Macarthur FC	1–0	Western United	Sydney
17:30 AEDT	Auglah 90+3'	Report		Stadium: Campbelltown Sports Stadium; Attendance: 2,863; Referee: Alireza Faghani

11 November 2023 4	Western United	0–1	Newcastle Jets	Ballarat
15:30 AEDT		Report	Stamatelopoulos 44'	Stadium: Mars Stadium; Attendance: 2,410; Referee: Casey Reibelt

26 November 2023 5	Western United	1–3	Adelaide United	Ballarat
17:00 AEDT	Wales 53'	Report	Halloran 30'; Popovic 56'; Jovanovic 63'	Stadium: Mars Stadium; Attendance: 2,497; Referee: Jonathan Barreiro

2 December 2023 6	Western United	0–1	Wellington Phoenix	Ballarat
15:30 AEDT		Report	Old 79'	Stadium: Mars Stadium; Attendance: 2,043; Referee: Tim Danaskos

8 December 2023 7	Central Coast Mariners	4–0	Western United	Gosford
19:45 AEDT	Hall 11'; Kaltak 24'; Túlio 44'; Kuol 82'	Report		Stadium: Industree Group Stadium; Attendance: 4,173; Referee: Adam Kersey

15 December 2023 8	Western United	2–1	Brisbane Roar	Melbourne
18:00 AEDT	Penha 83' (pen.); Risdon 90+1'	Report	O'Shea 69' (pen.)	Stadium: AAMI Park; Attendance: 2,842; Referee: Jack Morgan
Note: Match originally scheduled for 16 December at 19:30 AEDT. It was rescheduled for 15 December at 18:00 AEDT.

23 December 2023 9	Sydney FC	4–2	Western United	Sydney
17:30 AEDT	Gomes 26'; Lolley 40', 90+2'; Rodwell 47'	Report	Thurgate 5'; Grimaldi 83'	Stadium: Allianz Stadium; Attendance: 11,315; Referee: Jonathan Barreiro

30 December 2023 10	Newcastle Jets	2–0	Western United	Newcastle
17:30 AEDT	Buhagiar 9', 22'	Report		Stadium: McDonald Jones Stadium; Attendance: 6,453; Referee: Adam Kersey

7 January 2024 11	Western United	1–2	Melbourne City	Melbourne
17:00 AEDT	Ruhs 13'	Report	Sakhi 52'; Antonis 83'	Stadium: AAMI Park; Attendance: 6,265; Referee: Ben Abraham

12 January 2024 27	Macarthur FC	3–3	Western United	Sydney
17:30 AEDT	Dávila 32', 51', 90'	Report	Garuccio 3'; Penha 74', 85'	Stadium: CommBank Stadium; Attendance: 3,441; Referee: Adam Kersey

27 January 2024 14	Western United	0–1	Western Sydney Wanderers	Hobart
17:30 AEDT		Report	Brook 35'	Stadium: North Hobart Oval; Attendance: 3,850; Referee: Alex King

3 February 2024 15	Western United	2–2	Sydney FC	Hobart
17:30 AEDT	Botic 48'; Garuccio 53'	Report	Gomes 36' (pen.); Girdwood-Reich 43'	Stadium: North Hobart Oval; Attendance: 5,076; Referee: Lachlan Keevers

10 February 2024 16	Wellington Phoenix	2–0	Western United	Wellington
17:30 NZDT	Pennington 3'; Doanchie 47' (o.g.)	Report		Stadium: Sky Stadium; Attendance: 6,434; Referee: Adam Bavcar

16 February 2024 17	Western United	2–0	Newcastle Jets	Melbourne
19:45 AEDT	Penha 16' (pen.); Botic 55'	Report		Stadium: AAMI Park; Attendance: 2,947; Referee: Jack Morgan

20 February 2024 12	Melbourne Victory	2–1	Western United	Melbourne
19:00 AEDT	Da Silva 90+5', 90+9'	Report	Penha 60'	Stadium: AAMI Park; Attendance: 5,442; Referee: Jonathon Barreiro

23 February 2024 18	Brisbane Roar	2–2	Western United	Brisbane
18:45 AEST	Waddingham 58'; Markovski 90+1'	Report	Rukavytsya 6'; Botic 79'	Stadium: Suncorp Stadium; Attendance: 4,992; Referee: Casey Reibelt

2 March 2024 19	Western United	1–0	Perth Glory	Ballarat
17:00 AEDT	Botic 53'	Report		Stadium: Mars Stadium; Attendance: 3,016; Referee: Shaun Evans

8 March 2024 20	Western Sydney Wanderers	1–3	Western United	Sydney
19:45 AEDT	Milanovic 52'	Report	Grimaldi 69'; Penha 77'; Rukavytsya 81'	Stadium: CommBank Stadium; Attendance: 5,784; Referee: Ben Abraham

14 March 2024 21	Western United	2–2	Melbourne Victory	Melbourne
19:00 AEDT	Penha 43'; Garuccio 90'	Report	Folami 70'; Ikonomidis 79'	Stadium: AAMI Park; Attendance: 3,058; Referee: Shane Skinner

29 March 2024 22	Adelaide United	4–1	Western United	Adelaide
19:15 ACDT	Irankunda 19', 46', 48'; Clough 80' (pen.)	Report	Ruhs 50'	Stadium: Coopers Stadium; Attendance: 9,623; Referee: Adam Kersey

6 April 2024 23	Western United	4–2	Macarthur FC	Melbourne
15:30 AEDT	Danzaki 52'; Ruhs 56', 66'; Grimaldi 59'	Report	Germain 17' (pen.); Dávila 24'	Stadium: Ironbark Fields; Attendance: 3,430; Referee: Shaun Evans

13 April 2024 24	Western United	0–2	Central Coast Mariners	Melbourne
15:30 AEST		Report	Balard 51'; Theoharous 80'	Stadium: Ironbark Fields; Attendance: 3,043; Referee: Jonathon Barreiro

16 April 2024 13	Western United	3–3	Adelaide United	Melbourne
20:00 AEST	Grimaldi 19'; Donachie 34'; O'Toole 90+4'	Report	Ibusuki 45+7' (pen.), 57'; Irankunda 62'	Stadium: Ironbark Fields; Attendance: 2,086; Referee: Jack Morgan
Note: The match was originally scheduled for 20 January 2024 at 17:30 AEDT, but was postponed due to Western United not having a suitable venue available.

21 April 2024 25	Perth Glory	3–4	Western United	Perth
17:00 AWST	Taggart 23', 47'; Williams 90+3'	Report	Grimaldi 4'; Danzaki 65'; Walatee 74'; Lavale 90+2'	Stadium: HBF Park; Attendance: 4,651; Referee: Shane Skinner

28 April 2024 26	Melbourne City	1–0	Western United	Melbourne
17:00 AEST	Maclaren 19'	Report		Stadium: AAMI Park; Attendance: 7,402; Referee: Adam Kersey

=== Australia Cup ===
Win Draw Loss

9 August 2023 Round of 32	Edgeworth FC	0–4	Western United	Newcastle
19:30 AEST		Report	Botic 20'; Ruhs 28'; Wales 31', 58'	Stadium: Jack McLaughlan Oval; Attendance: 1,275; Referee: Daniel Cook

30 August 2023 Round of 16	Gold Coast Knights	0–2	Western United	Gold Coast
19:30 AEST		Report	Walker 72' (o.g.); Grimaldi 90+4'	Stadium: Croatian Sports Centre; Attendance: 910; Referee: Adam Kersey

17 September 2023 Quarter-finals	Sydney FC	3–0	Western United	Sydney
15:00 AEST	Caceres 11'; Wood 29'; Rodwell 67'	Report		Stadium: Leichhardt Oval; Attendance: 2,916; Referee: Casey Reibelt

== Statistics ==
=== Appearances and goals ===
Includes all competitions. Players with no appearances not included in the list.

As of 28 April 2024

No.	Pos.	Nat.	Player	A-League Men		Australia Cup		Total	
No.	Pos.	Nat.	Player	Apps	Goals	Apps	Goals	Apps	Goals
1	GK	(Australia)	Tom Heward-Belle	22	0	3	0	25	0
4	DF	(Australia)	James Donachie	10	1	3	0	13	1
6	DF	(Japan)	Tomoki Imai	24	0	3	0	27	0
7	FW	(Australia)	Ramy Najjarine	2+10	0	0+1	0	13	0
8	FW	(Australia)	Lachlan Wales	27	2	3	2	30	4
9	FW	(Australia)	Michael Ruhs	17+7	4	3	1	27	5
10	MF	(Australia)	Steven Lustica	13+2	0	0+2	0	17	0
11	MF	(Brazil)	Daniel Penha	20+2	7	0+1	0	23	7
13	FW	(Australia)	Nikita Rukavytsya	2+14	2	0	0	16	2
17	DF	(Australia)	Ben Garuccio	23	3	3	0	26	3
19	DF	(Australia)	Josh Risdon	21	1	3	0	24	1
21	MF	(Australia)	Sebastian Pasquali	14+7	0	2	0	23	0
22	DF	(Australia)	Kane Vidmar	12+1	0	0	0	13	0
24	DF	(Australia)	Connor O'Toole	0+7	1	0	0	7	1
27	DF	(Australia)	Jacob Tratt	10	0	0+2	0	12	0
29	DF	(Iraq)	Charbel Shamoon	3+2	0	0	0	5	0
32	MF	(Australia)	Angus Thurgate	27	1	3	0	30	1
33	GK	(Australia)	Matt Sutton	5	0	0	0	5	0
34	MF	(Australia)	James York	0+2	0	0	0	2	0
35	FW	(Australia)	Max Bisetto	0	0	0+2	0	2	0
36	DF	(Australia)	Zach Lisolajski	1+5	0	0	0	6	0
37	FW	(Australia)	Luke Vickery	0+4	0	0	0	4	0
38	FW	(Australia)	Noah Botic	16+3	5	1+1	1	21	6
39	MF	(Australia)	Matthew Grimaldi	10+13	5	0+2	1	25	6
41	FW	(Australia)	Oliver Lavale	0+4	1	2	0	6	1
42	MF	(Australia)	Rhys Bozinovski	0+10	0	0	0	10	0
43	DF	(Australia)	Khoder Kaddour	4+1	0	0	0	5	0
44	MF	(Australia)	Jordan Lauton	0+1	0	0	0	1	0
45	FW	(Australia)	Abel Walatee	0+3	1	0	0	3	1
49	FW	(Australia)	Jake Najdovski	0+6	0	0+1	0	7	0
77	MF	(Japan)	Riku Danzaki	14+6	2	3	0	23	2

=== Disciplinary record ===
Includes all competitions. The list is sorted by squad number when total cards are equal. Players with no cards not included in the list.

As of 28 April 2024

Rank	No.	Pos.	Nat.	Name	A-League Men			Australia Cup			Total		
Rank	No.	Pos.	Nat.	Name	Yellow card	(yellow card) (yellow-red card)	Red card	Yellow card	(yellow card) (yellow-red card)	Red card	Yellow card	(yellow card) (yellow-red card)	Red card
1	6	DF	(Japan)	Tomoki Imai	5	0	1	1	0	0	6	0	1
2	4	DF	(Australia)	James Donachie	3	0	1	1	0	0	4	0	1
3	19	DF	(Australia)	Josh Risdon	11	0	0	2	0	0	13	0	0
4	9	FW	(Australia)	Michael Ruhs	4	0	0	1	0	0	5	0	0
5	10	MF	(Australia)	Steven Lustica	4	0	0	0	0	0	4	0	0
5	17	DF	(Australia)	Ben Garuccio	4	0	0	0	0	0	4	0	0
5	39	MF	(Australia)	Matthew Grimaldi	4	0	0	0	0	0	4	0	0
8	8	FW	(Australia)	Lachlan Wales	3	0	0	0	0	0	3	0	0
8	11	MF	(Brazil)	Daniel Penha	3	0	0	0	0	0	3	0	0
8	21	MF	(Australia)	Sebastian Pasquali	3	0	0	0	0	0	3	0	0
8	32	MF	(Australia)	Angus Thurgate	3	0	0	0	0	0	3	0	0
12	22	DF	(Australia)	Kane Vidmar	2	0	0	0	0	0	2	0	0
12	27	DF	(Australia)	Jacob Tratt	2	0	0	0	0	0	2	0	0
14	24	DF	(Australia)	Connor O'Toole	1	0	0	0	0	0	1	0	0
14	29	DF	(Iraq)	Charbel Shamoon	1	0	0	0	0	0	1	0	0
14	42	MF	(Australia)	Rhys Bozinovski	1	0	0	0	0	0	1	0	0
14	49	FW	(Australia)	Jake Nadjovski	1	0	0	0	0	0	1	0	0
14	77	MF	(Japan)	Riku Danzaki	1	0	0	0	0	0	1	0	0
Total					56	0	2	5	0	0	61	0	2

=== Clean sheets ===
Includes all competitions. The list is sorted by squad number when total clean sheets are equal. Numbers in parentheses represent games where both goalkeepers participated and both kept a clean sheet; the number in parentheses is awarded to the goalkeeper who was substituted on, whilst a full clean sheet is awarded to the goalkeeper who was on the field at the start and end of play. Goalkeepers with no clean sheets not included in the list.

As of 28 April 2024

Rank	No.	Nat.	Goalkeeper	A-League Men	Australia Cup	Total
1	1	(Australia)	Tom Heward-Belle	1	2	3
2	33	(Australia)	Matt Sutton	1	0	1
Total				2	2	4

== See also ==
- 2023–24 Western United FC (A-League Women) season
