= 2022–23 Western United FC season =

Western United
2022–23 season
- Chairman: Jason Sourasis
- Manager: John Aloisi
- Stadium: AAMI Park; Mars Stadium; North Hobart Oval; UTAS Stadium
- A-League Men: 7th
- A-League Men Finals: DNQ
- Australia Cup: Round of 16
- Top goalscorer: League: Noah Botic (6); All: Noah Botic (6)
- Highest home attendance: 5,753 vs. Melbourne City (22 April 2023); A-League Men
- Lowest home attendance: 2,253 vs. Brisbane Roar (30 December 2022); A-League Men
- Average home league attendance: 3,168
- Biggest win: 3–1 vs. Newcastle Jets (A) (25 February 2023); A-League Men
- Biggest defeat: 0–4 vs. Melbourne City (A) (7 January 2023); A-League Men
Home colours	Away colours
- All statistics correct as of 28 April 2023.

The 2022–23 season was the fourth in the history of Western United Football Club. In addition to the domestic league, Western United also participated in the Australia Cup for the second time.

== Review ==
=== Background ===
The 2021–22 season saw the club finish in third place, its highest ever finish and compete in the finals for the second time. The club then went on to appear in and win its first ever grand final on 28 May 2022 against Melbourne City.

== Players ==
=== First-team squad ===
Note: Flags indicate national team as defined under FIFA eligibility rules; some limited exceptions apply. Players may hold more than one non-FIFA nationality.

No.	Pos.	Nation	Player
1	GK	ENG	Jamie Young
4	DF	SUI	Léo Lacroix
5	DF	AUS	Dylan Pierias
6	DF	JPN	Tomoki Imai
7	MF	MLI	Tongo Doumbia
8	FW	AUS	Lachlan Wales
9	FW	AUS	Michael Ruhs
10	MF	AUS	Steven Lustica
11	FW	AUS	Connor Pain
14	MF	AUS	James Troisi
17	DF	AUS	Ben Garuccio
19	DF	AUS	Josh Risdon (vice-captain)
20	FW	AUS	Ramy Najjarine
21	MF	AUS	Sebastian Pasquali

No.	Pos.	Nation	Player
23	MF	ITA	Alessandro Diamanti (captain)
24	DF	AUS	Connor O'Toole
27	DF	AUS	Jacob Tratt
31	MF	AUS	Adisu Bayew (scholarship)
33	DF	AUS	Ben Collins (scholarship)
36	DF	AUS	Ajak Deu (scholarship)
37	GK	AUS	Ryan Scott
38	FW	AUS	Noah Botic
42	MF	AUS	Rhys Bozinovski
44	DF	AUS	Nikolai Topor-Stanley
49	FW	AUS	Jake Najdovski (scholarship)
88	MF	AUS	Neil Kilkenny
99	FW	SRB	Aleksandar Prijović

== Transfers ==
=== Transfers in ===
No.	Position	Player	Transferred from	Type/fee	Contract length	Date	Ref.
14	MF	James Troisi	Western Sydney Wanderers	Free transfer	1 year	17 July 2022	
27	DF	Jacob Tratt	Unattached	Free transfer	1 year	22 August 2022	
7	MF	(Mali) Tongo Doumbia	Unattached	Free transfer	1 year	24 August 2022	
9	FW	Michael Ruhs	Central Coast Mariners	Free transfer	2.5 years	7 January 2023	
24	DF	Connor O'Toole	Sydney FC	Free transfer	1.5 years	7 January 2023	
20	MF	Ramy Najjarine	Western Sydney Wanderers	Free transfer	2.5 years	7 January 2023	

==== From youth squad ====
N	Pos.	Nat.	Name	Age	Notes
49	FW	(Australia)	Jake Najdovski	17	2 year scholarship contract

=== Transfers out ===
No.	Position	Player	Transferred to	Type/fee	Date	Ref
13	DF	Ivan Vujica	Unattached	End of contract	10 June 2022	
16	MF	(Slovenia) Rene Krhin	Unattached	End of contract	10 June 2022	
27	MF	Jerry Skotadis	Unattached	End of contract	10 June 2022	
34	FW	Christian Theoharous	Central Coast Mariners	Mutual contract termination	17 January 2023	
12	DF	Dalibor Markovic	Unattached	Mutual contract termination	20 January 2023	
9	FW	Dylan Wenzel-Halls	Central Coast Mariners	Mutual contract termination	29 January 2023	
25	MF	Luke Duzel	Adelaide United	Mutual contract termination	6 February 2023	
26	MF	Nicolas Milanovic	Western Sydney Wanderers	Mutual contract termination	7 February 2023	

=== Contract extensions ===
No.	Name	Position	Duration	Date	Notes	Ref.
4	(Switzerland) Léo Lacroix	Defender	1 year	29 May 2022	extension triggered	
44	Nikolai Topor-Stanley	Defender	1 year	10 June 2022		
33	Ben Collins	Defender	1 year	17 June 2022		
21	Sebastian Pasquali	Midfielder	1 year	1 July 2022		
17	Ben Garuccio	Left-back	2 years	7 September 2022	Contract extended from end of 2022–23 until end of 2024–25.	
42	Rhys Bozinovski	Midfielder	2 years	6 December 2022	Promoted from a scholarship contract to a senior contract	
11	Connor Pain	Winger	3 years	25 January 2023	Contract extended from end of 2022–23 until end of 2025–26.	
38	Noah Botic	Centre forward	2 years	8 March 2023	Contract extended from end of 2022–23 until end of 2024–25.	
10	Steven Lustica	Central midfielder	1 year	16 March 2023	Contract extended from end of 2022–23 until end of 2023–24.	
27	Jacob Tratt	Central defender	1 year	23 March 2023	Contract extended from end of 2022–23 until end of 2023–24.	

== Pre-season and friendlies ==
9 August 2022	Western United	3–0	(Australia) Bulleen Lions	Melbourne
19:30 AEST	Botic 79'; Lustica 82' (pen.); Wales 88'	Report		Stadium: City Vista Recreation Reserve

24 August 2022	Western United	6–0	(Australia) St Albans Saints	Melbourne
19:45 AEST	Wenzel-Halls 14'; Milanovic 40'; Pierias 44'; Wales 60'; Lavale 64'; Botic 89'	Report		Stadium: Valley Park Events Centre

27 August 2022	Western United	6–0	(Australia) Pascoe Vale	Melbourne
	Wales 8', 12'; Lo Monaco 40'; Wenzel-Halls 87', 90'; ? (?)	Report

10 September 2022	Western Sydney Wanderers	1–1	Western United	Parramatta
	Krpić 38'	Report	Botic 81'	Stadium: Wanderers Football Park

17 September 2022	Adelaide United	2–3	Western United	Adelaide
11:00 ACST	Halloran 4', 37'	Report	Wenzel-Halls 56', 70'; Pierias 63'	Stadium: ServiceFM Stadium

21 September 2022	Oakleigh Cannons (Australia)	1–5	Western United	Melbourne
19:00 AEST	? 32'	Report	Milanovic 9', 20', 51'; Najdovski 27'; Tratt 31'	Stadium: Jack Edwards Reserve

24 September 2022	Western United	2–1	Central Coast Mariners	Melbourne
15:00 AEST	Tratt 76'; Pain 81'	Report	Ruhs 37'	Stadium: The Hangar

29 November 2022	Western United	3–3	Adelaide United	Melbourne
	Milanovic (?); Pierias (?)	Report	Ibusuki (?); Alagich (?); Blackwood (?)	Stadium: The Hangar; Attendance: 0 (behind closed doors)

== Competitions ==
=== Overview ===
Competition	First match	Last match	Starting round	Final position	Record							
Competition	First match	Last match	Starting round	Final position	Pld	W	D	L	GF	GA	GD	Win %
A-League Men	7 October 2022	29 April 2023	Matchday 1	7th	26	9	5	12	34	47	−13	34.62
Australia Cup	3 August 2022	14 August 2022	Round of 32	Round of 16	2	1	1	0	3	2	+1	50.00
Total					28	10	6	12	37	49	−12	35.71

Last updated: 29 April 2023
Source: Soccerway

=== A-League Men ===
==== League table ====
Pos	Team	Pld	W	D	L	GF	GA	GD	Pts	Qualification
5	Sydney FC	26	11	5	10	40	39	+1	38	Qualification for Finals series (Note: The top two teams enter the finals series at the semi-finals, while the teams ranked third to sixth enter the finals series at the elimination-finals.)
6	Wellington Phoenix (Note: Wellington Phoenix cannot qualify for Asian Football Confederation competitions as they are based in New Zealand, which is under the Oceania Football Confederation.)	26	9	8	9	39	45	−6	35	Qualification for Finals series
7	Western United	26	9	5	12	34	47	−13	32	
8	Brisbane Roar	26	7	9	10	26	33	−7	30	
9	Perth Glory	26	7	8	11	36	46	−10	29	Qualification for 2023 Australia Cup play-offs

Source: A-Leagues
Rules for classification: 1) Points; 2) Goal difference; 3) Goals scored; 4) Points per game; 5) Least red cards; 6) Least yellow cards; 7) Toss of a coin in an event of a tie of two clubs.

==== Results summary ====
Overall								Home						Away					
Pld	W	D	L	GF	GA	GD	Pts	W	D	L	GF	GA	GD	W	D	L	GF	GA	GD
26	9	5	12	34	47	−13	32	4	3	6	14	23	−9	5	2	6	20	24	−4

Last updated: 29 April 2023.
Source: Ultimate A-League

==== Results by round ====
Round	1	2	3	4	5	6	7	8	9	10	11	12	13	14	15	16	17	18	19	20	21	22	23	24	25	26
Ground	A	H	H	A	H	A	A	H	H	H	A	H	H	A	A	H	H	A	H	A	A	A	H	A	H	A
Result	L	L	D	L	L	W	L	W	W	D	L	D	W	D	L	L	L	W	W	W	L	D	L	W	L	W
Position	11	12	12	12	12	11	12	11	10	10	10	11	9	11	11	11	12	11	9	7	8	9	10	8	9	7
Points	0	0	1	1	1	4	4	7	10	11	11	12	15	16	16	16	16	19	22	25	25	26	26	29	29	32

Updated to match(es) played on 29 April 2023. Source: Ultimate A-League
A = Away; H = Home; W = Win; D = Draw; L = Loss

==== Matches ====
Win Draw Loss Fixtures

7 October 2022 1	Melbourne City	2–1	Western United	Melbourne
19:45 AEDT	Lacroix 38' (o.g.); Maclaren 59'	Report	Milanovic 90+2'	Stadium: AAMI Park; Attendance: 7,501; Referee: Shaun Evans

16 October 2022 2	Western United	1–3	Sydney FC	Melbourne
17:00 AEDT	Risdon 16'	Report	Le Fondre 39' (pen.); Mak 41'; Lolley 69'	Stadium: AAMI Park; Attendance: 3,427; Referee: Alireza Faghani

21 October 2022 3	Western United	1–1	Macarthur FC	Melbourne
19:45 AEDT	Wales 71'	Report	Millar 24'	Stadium: AAMI Park; Attendance: 2,423; Referee: Kurt Ams

29 October 2022 4	Central Coast Mariners	4–2	Western United	Gosford
17:15 AEDT	Cummings 67'; Nkololo 74'; Farrell 78'; Ayongo 88'	Report	Milanovic 17'; Pain 28'	Stadium: Central Coast Stadium; Attendance: 4,773; Referee: Stephen Lucas

6 November 2022 5	Western United	2–4	Adelaide United	Melbourne
17:00 AEDT	Milanovic 53'; Pierias 90+1'	Report	Ibusuki 9'; Goodwin 22'; Lacroix 31' (o.g.); Halloran 79'	Stadium: AAMI Park; Attendance: 3,128; Referee: Alex King

13 November 2022 6	Wellington Phoenix	2–3	Western United	Wellington
15:00 NZDT	Zawada 22'; Kraev 59'	Report	Tratt 64'; Prijović 84'; Diamanti 90+5'	Stadium: Sky Stadium; Attendance: 5,203; Referee: Tim Danaskos

Mid-season break for 2022 FIFA World Cup

10 December 2022 7	Perth Glory	2–1	Western United	Perth
19:30 AWST	R. Williams 14'; Clisby 52'	Report	Kilkenny 83'	Stadium: Macedonia Park; Attendance: 3,893; Referee: Daniel Elder

18 December 2022 8	Western United	1–0	Western Sydney Wanderers	Melbourne
15:00 AEDT	Prijović 5'	Report		Stadium: AAMI Park; Attendance: 2,755; Referee: Adam Kersey

26 December 2022 9	Western United	1–0	Melbourne Victory	Melbourne
18:00 AEDT	Risdon 45+1'	Report		Stadium: AAMI Park; Attendance: 2,867; Referee: Tim Danaskos

30 December 2022 10	Western United	1–1	Brisbane Roar	Melbourne
19:45 AEDT	Prijović 78'		Armiento 28'	Stadium: AAMI Park; Attendance: 2,253; Referee: Shaun Evans

7 January 2023 11	Melbourne City	4–0	Western United	Melbourne
19:45 AEDT	Tilio 9'; Lacroix 12' (o.g.); Maclaren 24'; Nabbout 84'	Report		Stadium: AAMI Park; Attendance: 6,102; Referee: Alireza Faghani

15 January 2023 12	Western United	1–1	Newcastle Jets	Ballarat
17:00 AEDT	Wales 13'	Report	Stynes 17'	Stadium: Mars Stadium; Attendance: 2,356; Referee: Kurt Ams

21 January 2023 13	Western United	1–0	Sydney FC	Hobart
17:00 AEDT	Diamanti 86'	Report		Stadium: North Hobart Oval; Attendance: 5,127; Referee: Alex King

28 January 2023 14	Macarthur FC	2–2	Western United	Sydney
17:00 AEDT	Millar 67'; Drew 81'	Report	Wales 60'; Milanovic 89'	Stadium: Campbelltown Stadium; Attendance: 2,898; Referee: Ben Abraham

5 February 2023 15	Western Sydney Wanderers	1–0	Western United	Sydney
15:00 AEDT	Ngbakoto 28'	Report		Stadium: CommBank Stadium; Attendance: 7,849; Referee: Alireza Faghani

11 February 2023 16	Western United	2–3	Adelaide United	Melbourne
17:00 AEDT	Botic 43'; Prijović 48'	Report	Clough 68'; Kitto 76'; Goodwin 86' (pen.)	Stadium: AAMI Park; Attendance: 2,603; Referee: Shaun Evans

17 February 2023 17	Western United	0–3	Wellington Phoenix	Launceston
19:45 AEDT		Report	Sasse 19'; Kraev 58'; Zawada 64' (pen.)	Stadium: University of Tasmania Stadium; Attendance: 2,690; Referee: Daniel Elder

25 February 2023 18	Newcastle Jets	1–3	Western United	Newcastle
17:00 AEDT	Mikeltadze 33' (pen.)	Report	Botic 3', 29'; Doumbia 72'	Stadium: McDonald Jones Stadium; Attendance: 6,190; Referee: Ben Abraham

4 March 2023 19	Western United	2–1	Perth Glory	Ballarat
17:00 AEDT	Botic 42'; Doumbia 45'	Report	Elsey 22'	Stadium: Mars Stadium; Attendance: 2,586; Referee: Jonathan Barreiro

13 March 2023 20	Melbourne Victory	1–2	Western United	Melbourne
18:00 AEDT	Fornaroli 50'	Report	Botic 38'; Prijović 69'	Stadium: AAMI Park; Attendance: 9,157; Referee: Adam Kersey

18 March 2023 21	Brisbane Roar	1–0	Western United	Brisbane
17:00 AEDT	O'Shea 81'	Report		Stadium: Kayo Stadium; Attendance: 3,462; Referee: Stephen Lucas

1 April 2023 22	Sydney FC	3–3	Western United	Sydney
19:45 AEDT	Mak 22', 89'; Caballo 59'	Report	Wales 14'; Pain 25'; Brattan 56' (o.g.)	Stadium: Allianz Stadium; Attendance: 10,106; Referee: Chris Beath

7 April 2023 23	Western United	0–3	Central Coast Mariners	Ballarat
15:00 AEST		Report	Cummings 21'; Nkololo 35'; Wenzel-Halls 90+1'	Stadium: Mars Stadium; Attendance: 3,218; Referee: Jonathon Barreiro

16 April 2023 24	Adelaide United	0–1	Western United	Adelaide
16:30 ACST		Report	Pain 44'	Stadium: Coopers Stadium; Attendance: 10,110; Referee: Alex King

22 April 2023 25	Western United	1–3	Melbourne City	Melbourne
19:45 AEST	Pierias 38'	Report	Maclaren 13', 66', 74'	Stadium: AAMI Park; Attendance: 5,753; Referee: Chris Beath

29 April 2023 26	Perth Glory	1–2	Western United	Perth
20:00 AWST	Jelacic 45'	Report	Garuccio 25'; Botic 53'	Stadium: HBF Park; Attendance: 5,088; Referee: Daniel Elder

=== Australia Cup ===
Win Draw Loss

3 August 2022 Round of 32	Western United	2–1	Melbourne Victory	Melbourne
19:30 AEST	Timotheou 24' (o.g.); Wales 53'	Report	Brimmer 48'	Stadium: AAMI Park; Attendance: 3,670; Referee: Chris Beath

14 August 2022 Round of 16	Sydney United 58	1–1 (a.e.t.) (4–3 p)	Western United	Sydney
14:00 AEST	Maia 56'	Report	Pain 43'	Stadium: Sydney United Sports Centre; Attendance: 1,358; Referee: Stephen Lucas
	Penalties
	Trifiro (penalty scored); Fragogiannis (penalty scored); Roberts (penalty missed); Cimenti (penalty scored); Gonzalez (penalty scored)		(penalty scored) Botic; (penalty missed) Garuccio; (penalty scored) Milanovic; (penalty scored) Wales; (penalty missed) Lustica

== Statistics ==
=== Appearances and goals ===
Includes all competitions. Players with no appearances not included in the list.

As of 29 April 2023

No.	Pos.	Nat.	Name	A-League Men		Australia Cup		Total	
No.	Pos.	Nat.	Name	Apps	Goals	Apps	Goals	Apps	Goals
1	GK	(England)	Jamie Young	26	0	2	0	28	0
4	DF	(Switzerland)	Léo Lacroix	21+2	0	1	0	24	0
5	DF	(Australia)	Dylan Pierias	7+15	2	1+1	0	24	2
6	DF	(Japan)	Tomoki Imai	19	0	2	0	21	1
7	MF	(Mali)	Tongo Doumbia	16+3	2	0	0	19	2
8	FW	(Australia)	Lachlan Wales	24+2	4	2	1	28	5
9	FW	(Australia)	Michael Ruhs	0+7	0	0	0	7	0
10	MF	(Australia)	Steven Lustica	11+2	0	2	0	15	0
11	FW	(Australia)	Connor Pain	24+2	3	2	1	28	4
14	MF	(Australia)	James Troisi	14+4	0	0	0	18	0
17	DF	(Australia)	Ben Garuccio	18	1	2	0	20	1
19	DF	(Australia)	Josh Risdon	22	2	2	0	24	2
20	FW	(Australia)	Ramy Najjarine	0+1	0	0	0	1	0
21	MF	(Australia)	Sebastian Pasquali	2+4	0	0	0	6	0
23	MF	(Italy)	Alessandro Diamanti	2+19	2	0	0	21	2
24	DF	(Australia)	Connor O'Toole	2	0	0	0	2	0
27	DF	(Australia)	Jacob Tratt	9+5	1	0	0	14	1
31	FW	(Australia)	Adisu Bayew	0+5	0	0+1	0	6	0
33	DF	(Australia)	Ben Collins	0+1	0	1+1	0	3	0
37	GK	(Australia)	Ryan Scott	0+1	0	0	0	1	0
38	FW	(Australia)	Noah Botic	10+11	6	0+2	0	23	6
42	MF	(Australia)	Rhys Bozinovski	1+9	0	2	0	12	0
44	DF	(Australia)	Nikolai Topor-Stanley	13+2	0	0	0	15	0
88	MF	(Australia)	Neil Kilkenny	19+1	1	0	0	20	1
99	FW	(Serbia)	Aleksandar Prijović	14+2	5	0	0	16	5
Player(s) transferred out but featured this season
9	FW	(Australia)	Dylan Wenzel-Halls	6+1	0	2	0	9	0
26	FW	(Australia)	Nicolas Milanovic	3+12	4	1+1	0	16	4
41	DF	(Australia)	Jalil Regague	0	0	0+1	0	1	0

=== Disciplinary record ===
Includes all competitions. The list is sorted by squad number when total cards are equal. Players with no cards not included in the list.

As of 29 April 2023

Rank	No.	Pos.	Nat.	Name	A-League Men			Australia Cup			Total		
Rank	No.	Pos.	Nat.	Name	Yellow card	(yellow card) (yellow-red card)	Red card	Yellow card	(yellow card) (yellow-red card)	Red card	Yellow card	(yellow card) (yellow-red card)	Red card
1	44	DF	(Australia)	Nikolai Topor-Stanley	2	0	2	0	0	0	2	0	2
2	4	DF	(Switzerland)	Léo Lacroix	6	0	1	0	0	0	6	0	1
3	27	DF	(Australia)	Jacob Tratt	2	0	1	0	0	0	2	0	1
4	19	DF	(Australia)	Josh Risdon	10	0	0	2	0	0	12	0	0
5	23	MF	(Italy)	Alessandro Diamanti	5	0	0	0	0	0	5	0	0
6	7	MF	(Mali)	Tongo Doumbia	4	0	0	0	0	0	4	0	0
7	8	FW	(Australia)	Lachlan Wales	2	0	0	1	0	0	3	0	0
7	11	FW	(Australia)	Connor Pain	3	0	0	0	0	0	3	0	0
7	17	DF	(Australia)	Ben Garuccio	3	0	0	0	0	0	3	0	0
7	99	FW	(Serbia)	Aleksandar Prijovic	3	0	0	0	0	0	3	0	0
11	1	GK	(Australia)	Jamie Young	2	0	0	0	0	0	2	0	0
11	6	DF	(Japan)	Tomoki Imai	1	0	0	1	0	0	2	0	0
11	10	MF	(Australia)	Steven Lustica	1	0	0	1	0	0	2	0	0
11	14	MF	(Australia)	James Troisi	2	0	0	0	0	0	2	0	0
11	88	MF	(Australia)	Neil Kilkenny	2	0	0	0	0	0	2	0	0
16	5	DF	(Australia)	Dylan Pierias	1	0	0	0	0	0	1	0	0
Player(s) transferred out but featured this season
1	26	MF	(Australia)	Nicolas Milanovic	3	0	0	0	0	0	3	0	0
2	9	FW	(Australia)	Dylan Wenzel-Halls	1	0	0	0	0	0	1	0	0
Total					53	0	4	5	0	0	58	0	4

=== Clean sheets ===
Includes all competitions. The list is sorted by squad number when total clean sheets are equal. Numbers in parentheses represent games where both goalkeepers participated and both kept a clean sheet; the number in parentheses is awarded to the goalkeeper who was substituted on, whilst a full clean sheet is awarded to the goalkeeper who was on the field at the start and end of play. Goalkeepers with no clean sheets not included in the list.

As of 29 April 2023

Rank	No.	Nat.	Goalkeeper	A-League Men	Australia Cup	Total
1	1	(England)	Jamie Young	4	0	4
Total				4	0	4

== See also ==
- 2022–23 in Australian soccer
- List of Western United FC seasons
