= Chelsee Washington =

American soccer player (born 1997)

Personal information
- Full name: Chelsee Teresa Washington
- Date of birth: November 17, 1997 (age 28)
- Place of birth: Dallas, Texas, United States
- Height: 5 ft 8 in (1.73 m)
- Position: Midfielder

Youth career
- Solar Chelsea SC
- Dallas Texans SC

College career
Years	Team	Apps	(Gls)
2016–2019	Bowling Green Falcons	81	(19)

Senior career*
Years	Team	Apps	(Gls)
2018–2019	FC Dallas	14	(1)
2020–2022	Orlando Pride	11	(0)
2021–2022	→ Canberra United (loan)	13	(3)
- * Club domestic league appearances and goals as of November 15, 2022

Chelsee Teresa Washington (born November 17, 1997) is an American professional soccer player who plays as a midfielder.

== Early life ==
Born in Dallas, Texas, Washington was a standout soccer player for Hebron High School and was named the Texas High School District 6-6A MVP Midfielder of the Year in both her junior and senior seasons. As a sophomore she helped guide Hebron to a 24-2-2 record and a 5A State championship. She played club soccer Solar Chelsea SC and the Dallas Texans SC, and was a six-year starter between the two club teams from 2011 to 2016 in the ECNL.

=== Bowling Green Falcons ===
Washington played college soccer at Bowling Green State University. She was a four-year starter between 2016 and 2019 as the team won two regular season and two MAC Tournament titles. She earned multiple individual accolades during her tenure including Mid-American Conference Offensive Player of the Year in 2019 and All-MAC First Team selections in both 2018 and 2019. In 2019, Washington was named to the United Soccer Coaches All-Midwest Region First Team, becoming the second player in school history to earn all-region first-team accolades.

In the 2018 and 2019 offseasons, Washington played for WPSL club FC Dallas, making 14 appearances and scoring one goal.

== Professional career ==
=== Orlando Pride ===
Washington was selected in the fourth round (30th overall) of the 2020 NWSL College Draft by Orlando Pride. In doing so she became the first player in program history to be drafted. With the season disrupted by the COVID-19 pandemic, Washington originally signed a short-term contract with Orlando ahead of the 2020 NWSL Challenge Cup before the team was forced to withdraw. In September, Washington was signed through the 2021 season and made her debut on September 19, 2020, in the first Fall Series match, entering as an 87th minute substitute in a 0–0 draw with North Carolina Courage. She appeared in all four Fall Series matches for a combined 191 minutes.

On November 1, 2021, Washington joined Australian A-League Women team Canberra United on loan for the 2021–22 season having had her 2022 club option exercised by Orlando. She made 13 appearances and scored three goals, the joint second-most on the team.

Washington was released upon the expiry of her Orlando Pride contract in November 2022.

== Career statistics ==
=== College ===
School	Season	Division	Apps	Goals
Bowling Green Falcons	2016	Div. I	19	1
Bowling Green Falcons	2017	Div. I	21	3
Bowling Green Falcons	2018	Div. I	22	9
Bowling Green Falcons	2019	Div. I	19	6
Career total			81	19

=== Club ===
As of October 1, 2022.

Club	Season	League			Cup (Note: NWSL Challenge Cup)		Playoffs		Other		Total	
Club	Season	Division	Apps	Goals	Apps	Goals	Apps	Goals	Apps	Goals	Apps	Goals
FC Dallas	2018	WPSL	6	0	—		—		—		6	0
FC Dallas	2019	WPSL	8	1	—		—		—		8	1
FC Dallas	Total		14	1	0	0	0	0	0	0	14	1
Orlando Pride	2020	NWSL	—		—		—		4 (Note: Includes the NWSL Fall Series)	0	4	0
Orlando Pride	2021	NWSL	10	0	1	0	—		—		11	0
Orlando Pride	2022	NWSL	1	0	2	0	—		—		3	0
Orlando Pride	Total		11	0	3	0	0	0	4	0	18	0
Canberra United (loan)	2021–22	A-League Women	13	3	—		—		—		13	3
Career total			38	4	3	0	0	0	4	0	45	4

== Honors ==
=== College ===
Bowling Green Falcons

- Mid-American Conference Regular Season: 2018, 2019
- Mid-American Conference Women's Soccer Tournament: 2018, 2019

=== Individual ===
- Mid-American Conference Offensive Player of the Year: 2019
