= 2021–22 A-League Men =

45th season of top-tier soccer league in Australia

A-League Men
- Season: 2021–22
- Dates: 19 November 2021 – 28 May 2022
- Champions: Western United (1st title)
- Premiers: Melbourne City (2nd title)
- Matches: 163
- Goals: 473 (2.9 per match)
- Top goalscorer: Jamie Maclaren (regular season, 15 goals); Jamie Maclaren (overall, 16 goals)
- Biggest home win: Western United 6–0 Perth Glory (16 April 2022)
- Biggest away win: Wellington Phoenix 0–6 Melbourne City (2 April 2022)
- Highest scoring: Newcastle Jets 6–1 Perth Glory (10 April 2022)
- Longest winning run: 5 matches Adelaide United; Central Coast Mariners
- Longest unbeaten run: 15 matches Melbourne Victory
- Longest winless run: 16 matches Perth Glory
- Longest losing run: 6 matches Perth Glory
- Highest attendance: 23,118; WSW 0–0 Sydney FC (20 November 2021)
- Lowest attendance: 38; Wellington Phoenix 3–0 Brisbane Roar (16 February 2022)
- Average attendance: 5,602 ( 143)
- (Note: Longest runs only include regular season results)

The 2021–22 A-League Men, known as the Isuzu UTE A-League for sponsorship reasons, was the 45th season of national level men's soccer in Australia, and the 17th since the establishment of the competition as the A-League in 2004.

Melbourne City were the defending champions and premiers, having won their first titles respectively the previous season. They retained the premiership, but lost the Grand Final to first-time grand finalists Western United.

== Clubs ==
Twelve clubs participated in the 2021–22 season.

Club	City	Home ground	Capacity
Adelaide United	Adelaide	Coopers Stadium	16,500
Brisbane Roar	Brisbane	Moreton Daily Stadium	11,500
Central Coast Mariners	Gosford	Central Coast Stadium	20,059
Central Coast Mariners	Mudgee	Glen Willow Regional Sports Stadium	10,000
Macarthur FC	Sydney	Campbelltown Stadium	20,000
Macarthur FC	Sydney	BlueBet Stadium	22,500
Macarthur FC	Newcastle	McDonald Jones Stadium	33,000
Melbourne City	Melbourne	AAMI Park	30,050
Melbourne Victory	Melbourne	AAMI Park	30,050
Newcastle Jets	Newcastle	McDonald Jones Stadium	33,000
Perth Glory	Perth	HBF Park	20,500
Perth Glory	Launceston	UTAS Stadium	19,000
Perth Glory	Sydney	Netstrata Jubilee Oval	20,500
Sydney FC	Sydney	Netstrata Jubilee Oval	20,500
Sydney FC	Sydney	Leichhardt Oval	20,000
Wellington Phoenix	Auckland	Eden Park	50,000
Wellington Phoenix	Gosford	Central Coast Stadium	20,059
Wellington Phoenix	Sydney	Netstrata Jubilee Oval	20,500
Wellington Phoenix	Sydney	Leichhardt Oval	20,000
Wellington Phoenix	Sydney	Campbelltown Stadium	20,000
Wellington Phoenix	Sydney	Endeavour Field	22,000
Wellington Phoenix	Wellington	Sky Stadium	34,500
Wellington Phoenix	Wollongong	WIN Stadium	23,000
Western Sydney Wanderers	Sydney	CommBank Stadium	30,000
Western United	Ballarat	Mars Stadium	11,000
Western United	Ballarat	Morshead Park	8,500
Western United	Geelong	GMHBA Stadium	26,000 (Note: GMHBA Stadium was undergoing construction during the season, which reduced the stadium's capacity to around 26,000. The stadium had a capacity of 40,000 after construction was complete.)
Western United	Launceston	UTAS Stadium	19,000
Western United	Melbourne	AAMI Park	30,050

=== Personnel and kits ===
Team	Manager	Captain	Kit manufacturer	Kit sponsor
Adelaide United	(Australia) Carl Veart	(Australia) Craig Goodwin	UCAN	Flinders University; Australian Outdoor Living (Note: Away kit)
Brisbane Roar	(Australia) Warren Moon	(Scotland) Tom Aldred	New Balance	ActronAir
Central Coast Mariners	(Scotland) Nick Montgomery	(Australia) Oliver Bozanic	Paladin Sports	MATE
Macarthur FC	(Australia) Ante Milicic	(Mexico) Ulises Dávila	Macron	Wisdom Homes
Melbourne City	(Australia) Patrick Kisnorbo	(Australia) Scott Jamieson	Puma	Etihad Airways
Melbourne Victory	(Australia) Tony Popovic	(Australia) Joshua Brillante	Macron	Metricon
Newcastle Jets	(Australia) Arthur Papas	(Australia) Matthew Jurman	VIVA	Port of Newcastle; Ampcontrol (Note: Away kit)
Perth Glory	(Australia) Ruben Zadkovich	(Australia) Brandon O'Neill	Macron	BHP
Sydney FC	(Australia) Steve Corica	(Australia) Alex Wilkinson	Under Armour	The Star
Wellington Phoenix	(Australia) Ufuk Talay	(New Zealand) Alex Rufer	Paladin Sports	Spark; Oppo (Note: Away kit)
Western Sydney Wanderers	(Australia) Marko Rudan	(Australia) Rhys Williams	Kappa	Voltaren; Turner Freeman Lawyers (Note: Away kit)
Western United	(Australia) John Aloisi	(Italy) Alessandro Diamanti	Kappa	Simonds Homes

=== Managerial changes ===
Team	Outgoing manager	Manner of departure	Date of vacancy	Position on table	Incoming manager	Date of appointment
Melbourne Victory	(Scotland) Steve Kean (caretaker)	End of contract	10 June 2021	Pre-season	(Australia) Tony Popovic	22 April 2021
Newcastle Jets	(Australia) Craig Deans	Resigned	3 June 2021	Pre-season	(Australia) Arthur Papas	28 June 2021
Western United	(Australia) Marko Rudan	Sacked	8 June 2021	Pre-season	(Australia) John Aloisi	15 July 2021
Central Coast Mariners	(Australia) Alen Stajcic	Resigned	17 June 2021	Pre-season	(Scotland) Nick Montgomery	2 July 2021
Western Sydney Wanderers	(Wales) Carl Robinson	Sacked	30 January 2022	11th	(Australia) Marko Rudan	31 January 2022
Perth Glory	(Australia) Richard Garcia	Sacked	20 March 2022	12th	(Australia) Ruben Zadkovich (caretaker)	20 March 2022

=== Foreign players ===
Club	Visa 1	Visa 2	Visa 3	Visa 4	Visa 5	Non-visa foreigner(s)	Former player(s)
Adelaide United	(Denmark) Michael Jakobsen	(England) Zach Clough	(Japan) Hiroshi Ibusuki	(Spain) Juande	(Spain) Javi López	(Spain) Isaías^{1}	
Brisbane Roar	(Argentina) Juan Lescano	(Germany) Matti Steinmann	(Republic of Ireland) Jay O'Shea	(Japan) Ryo Wada	(Scotland) Tom Aldred	(Afghanistan) Rahmat Akbari^{2} (Sri Lanka) Jack Hingert^{2}	(New Zealand) Aidan Munford^{2}
Central Coast Mariners	(Brazil) Moresche	(Costa Rica) Marco Ureña	(France) Béni Nkololo	(Germany) Nicolai Müller	(Japan) Cy Goddard	(Fiji) Dan Hall^{2} (New Zealand) Storm Roux^{2} (Scotland) Jason Cummings^{2}	
Macarthur FC	(England) Jordon Mutch	(England) Craig Noone	(Jamaica) Adrian Mariappa	(Mexico) Ulises Dávila	(Poland) Filip Kurto		(Cyprus) Antonis Martis^{2}
Melbourne City	(England) Carl Jenkinson	(France) Florin Berenguer	(Italy) Manuel Pucciarelli	(Japan) Tsubasa Endoh	(Portugal) Nuno Reis	(North Macedonia) Stefan Colakovski^{2}	
Melbourne Victory	(Croatia) Ivan Kelava	(Italy) Francesco Margiotta	(New Zealand) Marco Rojas	(Portugal) Roderick Miranda	(Spain) Rai Marchán	(Kenya) William Wilson^{2}	
Newcastle Jets	(Brazil) Daniel Penha	(Cameroon) Olivier Boumal	(Georgia (country)) Beka Mikeltadze	(Greece) Savvas Siatravanis	(Spain) Mario Arqués	(New Zealand) Dane Ingham^{2} (South Sudan) Valentino Yuel^{2}	
Perth Glory	(Curaçao) Darryl Lachman	(England) Daniel Sturridge	(Japan) Kosuke Ota	(Spain) Adrián Sardinero		(Burundi) Pacifique Niyongabire^{2} (Republic of Ireland) Andy Keogh^{1} (Serbia) Darko Stanojević^{2}	
Sydney FC	(Brazil) Bobô	(England) Adam Le Fondre	(Netherlands) Luciano Narsingh	(New Zealand) Kosta Barbarouses	(Serbia) Miloš Ninković	(Burundi) Elvis Kamsoba^{2}	
Wellington Phoenix	(England) David Ball	(England) Gary Hooper	(England) Scott Wootton	(Mexico) Gael Sandoval		(North Macedonia) Matthew Bozinovski^{2}	
Western Sydney Wanderers	(England) Jack Rodwell	(Israel) Tomer Hemed	(Japan) Keijiro Ogawa	(Scotland) Ziggy Gordon	(Spain) Tomás Mejías	(Ivory Coast) Adama Traoré^{1}	
Western United	(Italy) Alessandro Diamanti	(Japan) Tomoki Imai	(Serbia) Aleksandar Prijović	(Slovenia) Rene Krhin	(Switzerland) Léo Lacroix	(England) Jamie Young^{2}	

The following do not fill a Visa position:
^{1}Those players who were born and started their professional career abroad but have since gained Australian citizenship (or New Zealand citizenship, in the case of Wellington Phoenix);
^{2}Australian citizens (or New Zealand citizens, in the case of Wellington Phoenix) who have chosen to represent another national team;
^{3}Injury replacement players, or National team replacement players;
^{4}Guest players (eligible to play a maximum of fourteen games)

=== Salary cap exemptions and captains ===
Club	First Marquee	Second Marquee	Designated Player	Captain	Vice-captain
Adelaide United	None	None	None	(Australia) Stefan Mauk (Note: Mauk was captain of Adelaide United until his transfer to Fagiano Okayama on 27 February 2022.) (Australia) Craig Goodwin (Note: Goodwin replaced Mauk as captain of Adelaide United on 5 March 2022.)	(Australia) Ryan Kitto (Spain) Isaías
Brisbane Roar	None	None	None	(Scotland) Tom Aldred	None
Central Coast Mariners	None	None	None	(Australia) Oliver Bozanic	None
Macarthur FC	None	None	None	(Mexico) Ulises Dávila	None
Melbourne City	(Australia) Jamie Maclaren	None	None	(Australia) Scott Jamieson	None
Melbourne Victory	(New Zealand) Marco Rojas	(Australia) Chris Ikonomidis	(Portugal) Roderick Miranda	(Australia) Joshua Brillante	(Portugal) Roderick Miranda
Newcastle Jets	None	None	(Georgia (country)) Beka Mikeltadze	(Australia) Matthew Jurman	None
Perth Glory	(England) Daniel Sturridge	(Australia) Bruno Fornaroli	(Spain) Adrián Sardinero	(Australia) Brandon O'Neill	None
Sydney FC	None	None	None	(Australia) Alex Wilkinson	None
Wellington Phoenix	None	None	None	(New Zealand) Alex Rufer	(New Zealand) Oliver Sail
Western Sydney Wanderers	None	None	None	(Australia) Rhys Williams	None
Western United	(Italy) Alessandro Diamanti	None	None	(Italy) Alessandro Diamanti	(Australia) Josh Risdon

== Regular season ==
=== League table ===
Pos	Team	Pld	W	D	L	GF	GA	GD	Pts	Qualification
1	Melbourne City	26	14	7	5	55	33	+22	49	Qualification for finals series and 2023–24 AFC Champions League group stage (Note: Determined by which of the Premiers for the 2021–22 or 2022–23 seasons accrued the most combined points over both seasons. Melbourne City qualified as they were Premiers in both seasons.)
2	Melbourne Victory	26	13	9	4	42	25	+17	48	Qualification for finals series (Note: The top two teams enter the finals series at the semi-finals, while the teams ranked third to sixth enter the finals series at the elimination-finals.)
3	Western United (C)	26	13	6	7	40	30	+10	45	Qualification for finals series
4	Adelaide United	26	12	7	7	38	31	+7	43	Qualification for finals series
5	Central Coast Mariners	26	12	6	8	49	35	+14	42	Qualification for finals series
6	Wellington Phoenix (Note: Wellington Phoenix cannot qualify for Asian Football Confederation competitions as they are based in New Zealand, which is under the Oceania Football Confederation.)	26	12	3	11	34	49	−15	39	Qualification for finals series
7	Macarthur FC	26	9	6	11	38	47	−9	33	
8	Sydney FC	26	8	7	11	37	44	−7	31	
9	Newcastle Jets	26	8	5	13	45	43	+2	29	Qualification for 2022 Australia Cup play-offs (Note: The top 8 teams qualify for the round of 32, while the bottom four teams participate in a play-off round.)
10	Western Sydney Wanderers	26	6	9	11	30	38	−8	27	Qualification for 2022 Australia Cup play-offs
11	Brisbane Roar	26	7	5	14	29	39	−10	26	Qualification for 2022 Australia Cup play-offs
12	Perth Glory	26	4	6	16	20	43	−23	18	Qualification for 2022 Australia Cup play-offs

Source: A-Leagues
Rules for classification: 1) Points; 2) Goal difference; 3) Goals scored; 4) Points per game; 5) Least red cards; 6) Least yellow cards; 7) Toss of a coin in an event of a tie of two clubs.
(C) Champions

=== Fixtures and results ===
Home \ Away	ADE	BRI	CCM	MAC	MCY	MVC	NEW	PER	SYD	WEL	WSW	WUN	ADE	BRI	CCM	MAC	MCY	MVC	NEW	PER	SYD	WEL	WSW	WUN
Adelaide United		1–1	2–1	1–0	2–2	1–2	2–1	2–0	1–2	4–0	1–2	2–1					2–2	0–1						
Brisbane Roar	0–0		0–2	3–1	1–2	1–1	2–0	1–0	3–1	2–1	3–0	2–3	1–3									0–3		
Central Coast Mariners	3–0	2–1		3–3	1–3	1–1	2–0	1–1	2–0	5–0	2–0	1–0				4–2					0–5			
Macarthur FC	4–1	2–1	1–0		0–1	1–4	2–1	4–2	0–3	1–1	3–1	2–2							0–3				1–1	
Melbourne City	1–2	2–1	3–2	3–1		2–2	3–0	1–0	4–0	2–1	3–3	0–1						1–1		2–2				
Melbourne Victory	1–1	3–0	1–0	3–1	3–0		1–2	0–3	2–2	3–1	1–1	3–1		0–0										1–1
Newcastle Jets	1–2	2–1	1–2	2–2	2–4	1–2		6–1	2–0	4–0	1–0	1–1			2–4							4–0		
Perth Glory	1–1	2–0	0–0	0–1	2–0	0–1	0–0		0–2	0–1	1–1	0–2	1–2	1–4										
Sydney FC	2–3	1–1	3–2	0–1	1–2	1–4	2–2	1–2		2–1	3–2	1–1				2–2								3–0
Wellington Phoenix	1–1	3–0	2–1	3–1	0–6	1–0	3–2	2–1	1–1		0–2	2–1			0–4								1–0	
Western Sydney Wanderers	0–0	1–1	2–2	0–2	1–3	2–0	2–2	1–0	0–0	1–2		0–1							3–2		2–0			
Western United	1–0	1–0	2–2	2–0	1–0	0–1	2–1	1–0	1–0	1–4	3–2						2–2			6–0				

Source: A-League
Legend: Blue = home team win; Yellow = draw; Red = away team win.
For upcoming matches, an "a" indicates there is an article about the rivalry between the two participants.

=== AFC Champions League qualification ===
Due to the re-formatting of the AFC Champions League to have an inter-year schedule from September (northern hemisphere autumn-to-spring) instead of an intra-year schedule (northern hemisphere spring-to-autumn), the qualification for the 2023–24 AFC Champions League was changed. The single qualification spot for this competition goes to whichever of which of the Premiers for the current season or the following season accrues the most combined points over both seasons. Melbourne City won the Premiership in both the 2021–22 and 2022–23 seasons, thereby automatically qualifying for the Champions League.

== Finals series ==
=== Format ===
The finals series, which ran over three weeks, consisted of the top six teams from the regular season. In the first week of fixtures, the third-through-sixth ranked teams played a single-elimination match, with the two winners of those matches joining the first and second ranked teams in two-legged semi-final ties. The first and second placed teams chose whether they would play home or away in the first leg. The two winners of those matches meet in the Grand Final. This season was the first to use this format.

Elimination-finals
4	Adelaide United	3
5	Central Coast Mariners	1
3	Western United	1
6	Wellington Phoenix	0

Semi-finals
4	Adelaide United	0	1	1
1	Melbourne City (a.e.t.)	0	2	2
3	Western United	0	4	4
2	Melbourne Victory	1	1	2

Grand Final
1	Melbourne City	0
3	Western United	2

=== Elimination-finals ===
14 May 2022
19:45 AEST

Western United	1–0	Wellington Phoenix
Prijović 10'	Report

AAMI Park, Melbourne
Attendance: 3,376
Referee: Alex King

15 May 2022
15:35 ACST

Adelaide United	3–1	Central Coast Mariners
Goodwin 26'; Yengi 67'; Bernardo 90+2'	Report	Roux 71'

Coopers Stadium, Adelaide
Attendance: 10,113
Referee: Daniel Elder

=== Semi-finals ===
Summary

Team 1	Agg.	Team 2	1st leg	2nd leg
Melbourne City	2–1	Adelaide United	0–0	2–1 (a.e.t.)
Melbourne Victory	2–4	Western United	1–0	1–4

Matches

17 May 2022
19:05 AEST

Western United	0–1	Melbourne Victory
	Report	Brimmer 74'

AAMI Park, Melbourne
Attendance: 7,295
Referee: Alireza Faghani
21 May 2022
17:15 AEST

Melbourne Victory	1–4	Western United
Brimmer 37'	Report	Prijović 18', 49'; Wales 78'; Wenzel-Halls 90+9'

AAMI Park, Melbourne
Attendance: 15,349
Referee: Alex King

Western United won 4–2 on aggregate.

18 May 2022
18:35 ACST

Adelaide United	0–0	Melbourne City
	Report

Coopers Stadium, Adelaide
Attendance: 9,279
Referee: Chris Beath
22 May 2022
14:05 AEST

Melbourne City	2–1 (a.e.t.)	Adelaide United
Tilio 74'; Maclaren 92'	Report	Clough 48'

AAMI Park, Melbourne
Attendance: 9,347
Referee: Alireza Faghani

Melbourne City won 2–1 on aggregate.

=== Grand Final ===
28 May 2022
19:45 AEST (UTC+10:00)

Melbourne City	0–2	Western United
	Report	Reis 2' (o.g.); Prijović 30'

AAMI Park, Melbourne
Attendance: 22,495
Referee: Chris Beath

== Regular season statistics ==
=== Top scorers ===
Rank	Player	Club	Goals
1	(Australia) Jamie Maclaren	Melbourne City	15
2	(Georgia (country)) Beka Mikeltadze	Newcastle Jets	13
3	(Scotland) Jason Cummings	Central Coast Mariners	10
3	(Australia) Nicholas D'Agostino	Melbourne Victory	10
3	(Serbia) Aleksandar Prijović	Western United	10
3	(Australia) Craig Goodwin	Adelaide United	10
7	(Australia) Mathew Leckie	Melbourne City	9
8	(Australia) Bruno Fornaroli	Perth Glory	8
9	(Mexico) Ulises Dávila	Macarthur FC	7
9	(England) Adam Le Fondre	Sydney FC	7
9	(France) Beni Nkololo	Central Coast Mariners	7
9	(Costa Rica) Marco Ureña	Central Coast Mariners	7

=== Hat-tricks ===
Player	For	Against	Result	Date	Ref.
(England) Adam Le Fondre	Sydney FC	Central Coast Mariners	5–0 (A)	9 April 2022	
(Georgia (country)) Beka Mikeltadze	Newcastle Jets	Perth Glory	6–1 (H)	10 April 2022	
(Australia) Lachlan Wales	Western United	Perth Glory	6–0 (H)	16 April 2022	

Key
(A)	Away team
(H)	Home team

=== Clean sheets ===
Rank	Player	Club	Clean sheets
1	(England) Jamie Young	Western United	10
2	(Australia) Mark Birighitti	Central Coast Mariners	9
3	(Croatia) Ivan Kelava	Melbourne Victory	7
4	(Australia) Tom Glover	Melbourne City	6
5	(New Zealand) Oliver Sail	Wellington Phoenix	5
6	(Australia) Jack Duncan	Newcastle Jets	4
6	(Australia) Joe Gauci	Adelaide United	4
6	(Poland) Filip Kurto	Macarthur FC	4
6	(Australia) Liam Reddy	Perth Glory	4
6	(Australia) Andrew Redmayne	Sydney FC	4

== Awards ==
=== Annual awards ===
The following end of the season awards were announced at the 2021–22 Dolan Warren Awards night on 26 May 2022.

Award	Winner	Club
Johnny Warren Medal	(Australia) Jake Brimmer	Melbourne Victory
Young Footballer of the Year	(Australia) Angus Thurgate	Newcastle Jets
Golden Boot Award	(Australia) Jamie Maclaren	Melbourne City
Goalkeeper of the Year	(Australia) Mark Birighitti	Central Coast Mariners
Coach of the Year	(Australia) Tony Popovic	Melbourne Victory
Goal of the Year	(Australia) Ben Garuccio	Western United
Referee of the Year	(Australia) Alex King	

=== Team of the season ===
Team of the season
Goalkeeper	(Australia) Mark Birighitti (Central Coast Mariners)						
Defenders	(Australia) Jason Geria (Melbourne Victory)	(Switzerland) Léo Lacroix (Western United)		(Australia) Curtis Good (Melbourne City)			(Australia) Jason Davidson (Melbourne Victory)
Midfielders	(France) Florin Berenguer (Melbourne City)		(Australia) Joshua Brillante (Melbourne Victory)			(Australia) Craig Goodwin (Adelaide United)	
Forwards	(Australia) Nick D'Agostino (Melbourne Victory)		(Australia) Jake Brimmer (Melbourne Victory)			(Australia) Jamie Maclaren (Melbourne City)	
Substitutes	(England) Jamie Young (Western United)	(Australia) Ben Garuccio (Western United)	(Spain) Javi López (Adelaide United)	(Australia) Connor Metcalfe (Melbourne City)	(Mexico) Ulises Dávila (Macarthur FC)	(Brazil) Daniel Penha (Newcastle Jets)	(Australia) Neil Kilkenny (Western United)

== See also ==
- 2021–22 A-League Women
- 2021–22 Adelaide United FC season
- 2021–22 Brisbane Roar FC season
- 2021–22 Central Coast Mariners FC season
- 2021–22 Macarthur FC season
- 2021–22 Melbourne City FC season
- 2021–22 Melbourne Victory FC season
- 2021–22 Newcastle Jets FC season
- 2021–22 Perth Glory FC season
- 2021–22 Sydney FC season
- 2021–22 Wellington Phoenix FC season
- 2021–22 Western Sydney Wanderers FC season
- 2021–22 Western United FC season
