= 2022 A-League Men finals series =

A-League Men finals series
- Season: 2021–22
- Dates: 14–28 May 2022
- Champions: Western United
- Matches: 7
- Goals: 16 (2.29 per match)
- Top goalscorer: Aleksandar Prijović (4 goals)
- Biggest home win: Adelaide United 3–1 Central Coast Mariners (Elimination-finals, 15 May 2022)
- Biggest away win: Melbourne Victory 1–4 Western United (Semi-finals, 21 May 2022)
- Highest scoring: Melbourne Victory 1–4 Western United (Semi-finals, 21 May 2022)
- Highest attendance: 22,495; Melbourne City 0–2 Western United (Grand Final, 28 May 2022)
- Lowest attendance: 3,376; Western United 1–0 Wellington Phoenix (Elimination-finals, 14 May 2022)
- Total attendance: 77,254
- Average attendance: 11,036

The 2022 A-League Men finals series was the 17th annual edition of the A-League Men finals series, the playoffs tournament staged to determine the champion of the 2021–22 A-League Men season. The series was played over two weeks culminating in the 2022 A-League Men Grand Final, where Western United won their first championship 2–0 against premiers Melbourne City.

== Qualification ==
Melbourne City and Melbourne Victory were confirmed in their automatic semi-final spots within the last week of the regular season. Western United finished third for the top three finishers based in Melbourne to guarantee most of the finals series to be played in Melbourne, as Adelaide United, Central Coast Mariners and Wellington Phoenix were the last three finishers into the 2022 finals series.

Pos	Team	Pld	W	D	L	GF	GA	GD	Pts	Qualification
1	Melbourne City	26	14	7	5	55	33	+22	49	Qualification for finals series and 2023–24 AFC Champions League group stage (Note: Determined by which of the Premiers for the 2021–22 or 2022–23 seasons accrued the most combined points over both seasons. Melbourne City qualified as they were Premiers in both seasons.)
2	Melbourne Victory	26	13	9	4	42	25	+17	48	Qualification for finals series (Note: The top two teams enter the finals series at the semi-finals, while the teams ranked third to sixth enter the finals series at the elimination-finals.)
3	Western United (C)	26	13	6	7	40	30	+10	45	Qualification for finals series
4	Adelaide United	26	12	7	7	38	31	+7	43	Qualification for finals series
5	Central Coast Mariners	26	12	6	8	49	35	+14	42	Qualification for finals series
6	Wellington Phoenix (Note: Wellington Phoenix cannot qualify for Asian Football Confederation competitions as they are based in New Zealand, which is under the Oceania Football Confederation.)	26	12	3	11	34	49	−15	39	Qualification for finals series
7	Macarthur FC	26	9	6	11	38	47	−9	33	
8	Sydney FC	26	8	7	11	37	44	−7	31	
9	Newcastle Jets	26	8	5	13	45	43	+2	29	Qualification for 2022 Australia Cup play-offs (Note: The top 8 teams qualify for the round of 32, while the bottom four teams participate in a play-off round.)
10	Western Sydney Wanderers	26	6	9	11	30	38	−8	27	Qualification for 2022 Australia Cup play-offs
11	Brisbane Roar	26	7	5	14	29	39	−10	26	Qualification for 2022 Australia Cup play-offs
12	Perth Glory	26	4	6	16	20	43	−23	18	Qualification for 2022 Australia Cup play-offs

Source: A-Leagues
Rules for classification: 1) Points; 2) Goal difference; 3) Goals scored; 4) Points per game; 5) Least red cards; 6) Least yellow cards; 7) Toss of a coin in an event of a tie of two clubs.
(C) Champions

== Venues ==
Melbourne	2022 A-League Men finals series is located in Australia	Adelaide
AAMI Park	2022 A-League Men finals series is located in Australia	Coopers Stadium
Capacity: 30,050	2022 A-League Men finals series is located in Australia	Capacity: 16,500

== Bracket ==
The system used for the 2022 A-League Men finals series is the modified top-six play-offs by the A-Leagues. The top two teams enter the two-legged semi-finals receiving the bye for the elimination-finals in which the teams from third placed to sixth place enter the elimination-finals with "third against sixth" and "fourth against fifth". Losers for the elimination-finals are eliminated, and winners qualify for the two-legged semi-finals.

First placed team in the semi-finals plays the lowest ranked elimination-final winning team and second placed team in the semi-finals plays the highest ranked elimination-final winner. Home-state advantage goes to the team with the higher ladder position.

Elimination-finals
4	Adelaide United	3
5	Central Coast Mariners	1
3	Western United	1
6	Wellington Phoenix	0

Semi-finals
4	Adelaide United	0	1	1
1	Melbourne City (a.e.t.)	0	2	2
3	Western United	0	4	4
2	Melbourne Victory	1	1	2

Grand Final
1	Melbourne City	0
3	Western United	2

== Matches ==
=== Elimination-finals ===
Western United who finished third appeared in their first home finals match in club history, against the Wellington Phoenix who finished sixth. Wellington won all three matches in the regular season over Western United, and unbeaten since the first meeting in October 2019. Western United won 1–0 through a 10th-minute strike by Aleksandar Prijović to send them through to the two-legged semi-finals against Melbourne Victory.

14 May 2022
19:45 AEST

Western United	1–0	Wellington Phoenix
Prijović 10'	Report

AAMI Park, Melbourne
Attendance: 3,376
Referee: Alex King

Adelaide United and Central Coast Mariners met in a finals match for the first time since 2014 in Gosford. Central Coast hadn't beaten Adelaide United away since 2016, heading into this elimination-final. Adelaide won 3–1, where Craig Goodwin and Kusini Yengi led Adelaide by two, Storm Roux with one back for the Mariners as Bernardo capped the match off with a 92nd-minute winner heading for two-legged semi-finals against Melbourne City.

15 May 2022
15:35 ACST

Adelaide United	3–1	Central Coast Mariners
Goodwin 26'; Yengi 67'; Bernardo 90+2'	Report	Roux 71'

Coopers Stadium, Adelaide
Attendance: 10,113
Referee: Daniel Elder

=== Semi-finals ===
Team 1	Agg.	Team 2	1st leg	2nd leg
Melbourne City	2–1	Adelaide United	0–0	2–1 (a.e.t.)
Melbourne Victory	2–4	Western United	1–0	1–4

Western United qualified for the two-legged semi-finals at AAMI Park against rivals Melbourne Victory. Western United started off as the home side losing the first leg through a Jake Brimmer volley in the 74th minute, as Victory held the advantage 1–0 up in the first leg. Despite this, Western United won 4–1 in the second leg thanks to a brace from Aleksandar Prijović and goals to Lachlan Wales and Dylan Wenzel-Halls; winning the two-legged semi-finals 4–2 on aggregate to send them through to their first Grand Final.

17 May 2022
19:05 AEST

Western United	0–1	Melbourne Victory
	Report	Brimmer 74'

AAMI Park, Melbourne
Attendance: 7,295
Referee: Alireza Faghani
21 May 2022
17:15 AEST

Melbourne Victory	1–4	Western United
Brimmer 37'	Report	Prijović 18', 49'; Wales 78'; Wenzel-Halls 90+9'

AAMI Park, Melbourne
Attendance: 15,349
Referee: Alex King

Western United won 4–2 on aggregate.

Adelaide United qualified for the two-legged semi-finals against Melbourne City. Adelaide were unbeaten to Melbourne City in all three matches in the regular season, as well as Melbourne Victory and Western United which at least one is obligated for City to verse should they qualify for the Grand Final. The first leg resulted in a 0–0 draw in Adelaide. Although, Melbourne City won 2–1 after overtime from a comeback win thanks to goals by Marco Tilio and Jamie Maclaren for City reaching their third consecutive Grand Final.

18 May 2022
18:35 ACST

Adelaide United	0–0	Melbourne City
	Report

Coopers Stadium, Adelaide
Attendance: 9,279
Referee: Chris Beath
22 May 2022
14:05 AEST

Melbourne City	2–1 (a.e.t.)	Adelaide United
Tilio 74'; Maclaren 92'	Report	Clough 48'

AAMI Park, Melbourne
Attendance: 9,347
Referee: Alireza Faghani

Melbourne City won 2–1 on aggregate.

=== Grand Final ===
The 2022 Grand Final featured premiers Melbourne City for the third consecutive time and Western United for the first time at AAMI Park, also being the first featuring two expansion clubs in the A-League Men grand final. City won the double in the previous season and Western United searching for their first club trophy. It was won 2–0 by Western United as they claimed their first championship thanks to two first half goals by an own goal and Aleksandar Prijović; also winning the Joe Marston Medal.

28 May 2022
19:45 AEST (UTC+10:00)

Melbourne City	0–2	Western United
	Report	Reis 2' (o.g.); Prijović 30'

AAMI Park, Melbourne
Attendance: 22,495
Referee: Chris Beath
