= Ben Garuccio =

Australian soccer player

Personal information
- Full name: Benjamin Garuccio
- Date of birth: 15 June 1995 (age 31)
- Place of birth: Adelaide, Australia
- Height: 1.74 m (5 ft 9 in)
- Position: Left back

Team information
- Current team: Sydney FC
- Number: 17

Youth career
- Adelaide City
- 2010: SASI
- 2010–2011: Adelaide United
- 2011–2012: AIS

Senior career*
| Years | Team | Apps | (Gls) |
| 2012–2016 | Melbourne City | 45 | (1) |
| 2016–2018 | Adelaide United | 50 | (1) |
| 2018–2020 | Heart of Midlothian | 21 | (1) |
| 2020–2021 | Melbourne City | 21 | (0) |
| 2021–2025 | Western United | 87 | (7) |
| 2025– | Sydney FC | 20 | (1) |

International career^{‡}
| 2012–2014 | Australia U20 | 17 | (0) |
| 2018 | Australia U23 | 3 | (0) |
- * Club domestic league appearances and goals as of 26 April 2026 ‡ National team caps and goals as of 17 January 2018

Benjamin Garuccio (/ɡəˈruːtʃioʊ/ gə-ROO-chee-oh, Italian: [ɡaˈruttʃo]; born 15 June 1995) is an Australian professional soccer player who plays as a left back for Sydney FC.

Garuccio represented the Australian under-20 side on many occasions.

== Early life ==
Garuccio was born on 15 June 1995 in Adelaide, Australia. Growing up, he attended Henley High School and Canberra High School in Australia. After that, he attended UC Senior Secondary College Lake Ginninderra and Torrens University Australia in Australia.

== Career ==
=== Melbourne Heart ===
On 19 September 2012, Garuccio signed for A-League side Melbourne Heart, who have since been rebranded as Melbourne City. He suffered a stress fracture while playing for the club.

=== Adelaide United ===
On 16 June 2016, Garuccio returned to his hometown, signing a 2-year contract with Adelaide United.

=== Heart of Midlothian ===
Garuccio signed a pre-contract agreement with Scottish Premiership club Hearts in May 2018. He scored his first goal for Hearts in a 5–0 win against Inverness Caledonian Thistle on 29 July 2018, with a 25-yard free-kick.

=== Melbourne City ===
Garuccio returned to Australia in October 2020, signing for Melbourne City.

=== Western United ===
In July 2021, Garuccio secured a mutual termination of contract with Melbourne City, so he could join rival Melbourne club Western United. He captained the club. On 6 September 2025, Western United was placed into hibernation and all players were released from their contracts.

=== Sydney FC ===
Following the demise of Western United, Garuccio joined Sydney FC ahead of the 2025-26 A-League season, on a two-year contract. On 29 November 2025, Garuccio made his debut for the club, coming off the bench in the 53rd minute against arch-rivals Western Sydney Wanderers at Western Sydney Stadium. His starting debut would come against the Central Coast Mariners at Polytech Stadium, Gosford on 6 December 2025.

== Career statistics ==
As of 26 April 2026

Appearances and goals by club, season and competition
| Club | Season | League | | | Cup | | League Cup | | Continental | | Total | |
| Club | Season | Division | Apps | Goals | Apps | Goals | Apps | Goals | Apps | Goals | Apps | Goals |
|---|---|---|---|---|---|---|---|---|---|---|---|---|
| Melbourne City | 2012–13 | A-League | 5 | 0 | — | | — | | — | | 5 | 0 |
| Melbourne City | 2013–14 | A-League | 12 | 0 | — | | — | | — | | 12 | 0 |
| Melbourne City | 2014–15 | A-League | 7 | 0 | 1 | 0 | — | | — | | 8 | 0 |
| Melbourne City | 2015–16 | A-League | 21 | 1 | 1 | 0 | — | | — | | 22 | 1 |
| Melbourne City | Total | | 45 | 1 | 2 | 0 | — | | — | | 47 | 1 |
| Adelaide United | 2016–17 | A-League | 27 | 0 | 0 | 0 | — | | 5 | 0 | 32 | 0 |
| Adelaide United | 2017–18 | A-League | 23 | 1 | 1 | 0 | — | | — | | 24 | 1 |
| Adelaide United | Total | | 50 | 1 | 1 | 0 | — | | 5 | 0 | 56 | 1 |
| Heart of Midlothian | 2018–19 | Scottish Premiership | 17 | 0 | 3 | 0 | 3 | 1 | — | | 23 | 1 |
| Heart of Midlothian | 2019–20 | Scottish Premiership | 4 | 0 | 2 | 0 | 0 | 0 | — | | 6 | 0 |
| Heart of Midlothian | Total | | 21 | 0 | 5 | 0 | 3 | 1 | — | | 29 | 1 |
| Melbourne City | 2020–21 | A-League | 21 | 0 | — | | — | | — | | 21 | 0 |
| Western United | 2021–22 | A-League Men | 28 | 2 | 1 | 0 | — | | — | | 29 | 2 |
| Western United | 2022–23 | A-League Men | 18 | 1 | 2 | 0 | — | | — | | 20 | 1 |
| Western United | 2023–24 | A-League Men | 23 | 3 | 3 | 0 | — | | — | | 26 | 3 |
| Western United | 2024–25 | A-League Men | 18 | 1 | 1 | 0 | — | | — | | 19 | 1 |
| Western United | Total | | 87 | 7 | 7 | 0 | — | | — | | 94 | 7 |
| Sydney FC | 2025–26 | A-League Men | 20 | 1 | 0 | 0 | — | | — | | 20 | 1 |
| Career total | | | 244 | 10 | 15 | 0 | 3 | 1 | 5 | 0 | 267 | 11 |

== Honours ==
Melbourne City

- A-League Premiership: 2020–21
- A-League Championship: 2020–21

Western United

- A-League Men Championship: 2021–22

Individual

- A-Leagues All Star: 2022, 2024
- PFA A-League Men Team of the Season: 2021–22
