= Melbourne Victory FC–Western United FC rivalry =

Soccer rivalry in Australia

- Other names: Westgate Derby; Battle of the Bridge
- Location: Melbourne
- Teams: Melbourne Victory; Western United
- First meeting: 2 November 2019; A-League; Melbourne Victory 2–3 Western United
- Latest meeting: 10 January 2025; A-League Men; Melbourne Victory 3–4 Western United
- Stadiums: AAMI Park (Melbourne Victory and Western United)

Statistics
- Total meetings: 18
- Most wins: Western United (9)
- Top scorer: Besart Berisha; Jake Brimmer; Aleksandar Prijović (4 goals each)
- All-time series: Melbourne Victory: 6 Drawn: 3 Western United: 9
- Largest victory: Western United 1–6 Melbourne Victory; 2020–21 A-League (28 May 2021)

The Melbourne Victory FC–Western United FC rivalry, also known as the Battle of the Bridge and the Westgate Derby, is a rivalry between Victorian clubs Melbourne Victory and Western United.

Despite the rivalry's short existence, it has garnered a reputation for producing talking points, controversy, tension, goals and drama. In the team's first meeting, in November 2019 at Marvel Stadium, Western United won 3–2 despite going 2–0 down within the first 7 minutes. In February 2021 at Marvel Stadium, despite conceding the first goal of the match and despite being reduced to 10 men for the final half-hour of the match, Western United won 4–3, with Victor Sanchez scoring in the final minute of stoppage time. On 20 February 2024, with Western United leading 1-0 at the end of regulation time, Damien Da Silva scored two goals deep in injury time to secure a 2-1 win, putting the Victory back in finals contention after a 6 game winless streak.

Overall, Western United has won the most games in the rivalry's history, having won eight times with three draws while Melbourne Victory having won six times. Western United's record win was a 4–1 victory in an A-League Men Finals match at AAMI Park on 21 May 2022, with the Victory's record win being a 6–1 victory in an A-League match at AAMI Park on 28 May 2021. Besart Berisha, Jake Brimmer, and Aleksandar Prijović hold the mark for the most derby goals with four in all competitions.

Unfortunately the rivalry didn't take place in the 2025-26 Season due to western United's licence being put into hibernation due to the club having financial troubles. At the time the rivalry remained at the time with Western United had won 9 matches, Melbourne Victory had won 6 matches and 3 matches ended in a draw.

== Background ==
When Western United joined the A-League for the 2019–20 season as the competition's third Victorian club, they formed a rivalry with the Melbourne Victory nicknamed the Westgate Derby and the Battle of the Bridge.

== Results ==
=== Men's football ===
==== Melbourne Victory vs. Western United ====
| Venue | Date | Competition | Score | Home goalscorers | Away goalscorers | Attendance |
|---|---|---|---|---|---|---|
| Marvel Stadium | 2 November 2019 | A-League | 2–3 | Toivonen 6', Dobras 7' | Diamanti 16', Donachie 29' (o.g.), McDonald 51' | 20,865 |
| Bankwest Stadium | 25 July 2020 | A-League | 1–2 | Roux 83' | Uskok 38', Burgess 57' | 0 (BCD) |
| Marvel Stadium | 27 February 2021 | A-League | 3–4 | McManaman 21', Butterfield 62', Gestede 82' | Sánchez 42', 90+5', Berisha 53', 58' | 7,190 |
| AAMI Park | 26 December 2021 | A-League Men | 3–1 | Geria 18', Brillante 19', D'Agostino 90+4' | Prijović 87' | 13,186 |
| AAMI Park | 23 March 2022 | A-League Men | 1–1 | Hamill 85' | Topor-Stanley 47' | 5,022 |
| AAMI Park | 21 May 2022 | A-League Men Finals | 1–4 | Brimmer 37' | Prijović 18', 49', Wales 78', Wenzel-Halls 90+9' | 15,349 |
| AAMI Park | 13 March 2023 | A-League Men | 1–2 | Fornaroli 50' | Botic 38', Prijović 69' | 9,157 |
| AAMI Park | 20 February 2024 | A-League Men | 2–1 | Da Silva 90+5', 90+8' | Penha 60' | 5,442 |
| AAMI Park | 10 January 2025 | A-League Men | 3–4 | Hamill 9', Fornaroli 39', Santos 79' | Ibusuki 17', 90+4', Walatee 69', Botic 90+1' | 11,657 |

==== Western United vs. Melbourne Victory ====
| Venue | Date | Competition | Score | Home goalscorers | Away goalscorers | Attendance |
|---|---|---|---|---|---|---|
| GMHBA Stadium | 8 December 2019 | A-League | 3–1 | Berisha 17', 43', Kone 24' | Nabbout 14' | 10,128 |
| AAMI Park | 30 January 2021 | A-League | 0–0 | | | 7,016 |
| AAMI Park | 28 May 2021 | A-League | 1–6 | Diamanti 45+2' | Brimmer 12', Gestede 22', Kamsoba 33', 50', Folami 36', Butterfield 82' | 0 (BCD) |
| GMHBA Stadium | 20 November 2021 | A-League Men | 0–1 | | Miranda 75' | 8,120 |
| AAMI Park | 17 May 2022 | A-League Men Finals | 0–1 | | Brimmer 74' | 7,295 |
| AAMI Park | 3 August 2022 | Australia Cup | 2–1 | Timotheou 24' (o.g.), Wales 53' | Brimmer 48' | 3,670 |
| AAMI Park | 26 December 2022 | A-League Men | 1–0 | Risdon 45+1' | | 2,867 |
| AAMI Park | 14 March 2024 | A-League Men | 2–2 | Penha 43', Garuccio 90' | Folami 70', Ikonomidis 79' | 3,058 |
| AAMI Park | 1 December 2024 | A-League Men | 1–3 | Botic 19' | Machach 8', Vergos 48', Fornaroli 69' | 5,263 |

=== Fixture top scorers in the derby ===
As of 10 January 2025

| Rank | Scorer | Club(s) | Goals |
|---|---|---|---|
| 1 | (Kosovo) Besart Berisha | Western United | 4 |
| 1 | (Australia) Jake Brimmer | Melbourne Victory | 4 |
| 1 | (Serbia) Aleksandar Prijović | Western United | 4 |
| 4 | (Australia) Noah Botic | Western United | 3 |
| 4 | (Australia) Bruno Fornaroli | Melbourne Victory | 3 |
| 6 | (France) Damien Da Silva | Melbourne Victory | 2 |
| 6 | (Italy) Alessandro Diamanti | Western United | 2 |
| 6 | (Australia) Ben Folami | Melbourne Victory | 2 |
| 6 | (Japan) Hiroshi Ibusuki | Western United | 2 |
| 6 | (Burundi) Elvis Kamsoba | Melbourne Victory | 2 |
| 6 | (Brazil) Daniel Penha | Western United | 2 |
| 6 | (Spain) Víctor Sánchez | Western United | 2 |
| 6 | (Australia) Lachlan Wales | Western United | 2 |

=== Women's football ===
==== Melbourne Victory vs. Western United ====
| Venue | Date | Competition | Score | Home goalscorers | Away goalscorers | Attendance |
|---|---|---|---|---|---|---|
| Home of the Matildas | 6 January 2024 | A-League Women | 1–4 | Lowe 78' | Hieda 32', A. Taranto 34', Logarzo 60', 69' | 1,686 |
| Home of the Matildas | 17 November 2024 | A-League Women | 4–1 | Gielnik 1', 9', 41', O'Grady 80' | Zimmerman 20' | 1,014 |

==== Western United vs. Melbourne Victory ====
| Venue | Date | Competition | Score | Home goalscorers | Away goalscorers | Attendance |
|---|---|---|---|---|---|---|
| City Vista Recreation Reserve | 19 November 2022 | A-League Women | 1–0 | McDonald 54' | | 2,753 |
| City Vista Recreation Reserve | 22 October 2023 | A-League Women | 2–1 | M. Taranto 66', Hieda 90' | Checker 15' | 2,200 |
| Ironbark Fields | 1 March 2025 | A-League Women | 1–2 | Gielnik 45' (o.g.) | Furphy 10', Morrison 47' | 897 |

== Statistics and records ==
As of 10 January 2025, there have been 18 first-class meetings between the two teams since the first meeting in 2019, of which Western United have won nine, Melbourne Victory with six, and three draws. The most goals in one game were scored in was a 4–3 away win by Western United on 27 February 2021 and a 6–1 away win by Melbourne Victory on 28 May 2021. Western United have twice won in Victory's former home Docklands Stadium.

=== Results ===
==== Men's football ====
As of 10 January 2025

| Competition | Matches played | Victory wins | Draws | Western United wins | Victory goals | Western United goals |
|---|---|---|---|---|---|---|
| League | 15 | 5 | 3 | 7 | 29 | 26 |
| League Finals | 2 | 1 | 0 | 1 | 2 | 4 |
| Australia Cup | 1 | 0 | 0 | 1 | 1 | 2 |
| Total | 18 | 6 | 3 | 9 | 32 | 32 |

==== Women's football ====
As of 24 May 2025

| Competition | Matches played | Victory wins | Draws | Western United wins | Victory goals | Western United goals |
|---|---|---|---|---|---|---|
| League | 5 | 2 | 0 | 3 | 8 | 9 |
| League Finals | 0 | 0 | 0 | 0 | 0 | 0 |
| Total | 5 | 2 | 0 | 3 | 8 | 9 |

==== Total Combined ====
| Competition | Matches played | Victory wins | Draws | Western United wins | Victory goals | Western United goals |
|---|---|---|---|---|---|---|
| Combined League | 20 | 7 | 3 | 10 | 37 | 35 |
| Combined League Finals | 2 | 1 | 0 | 1 | 2 | 4 |
| Australia Cup | 1 | 0 | 0 | 1 | 1 | 2 |
| Combined Total | 23 | 8 | 3 | 12 | 40 | 41 |

== Players who played for both clubs ==
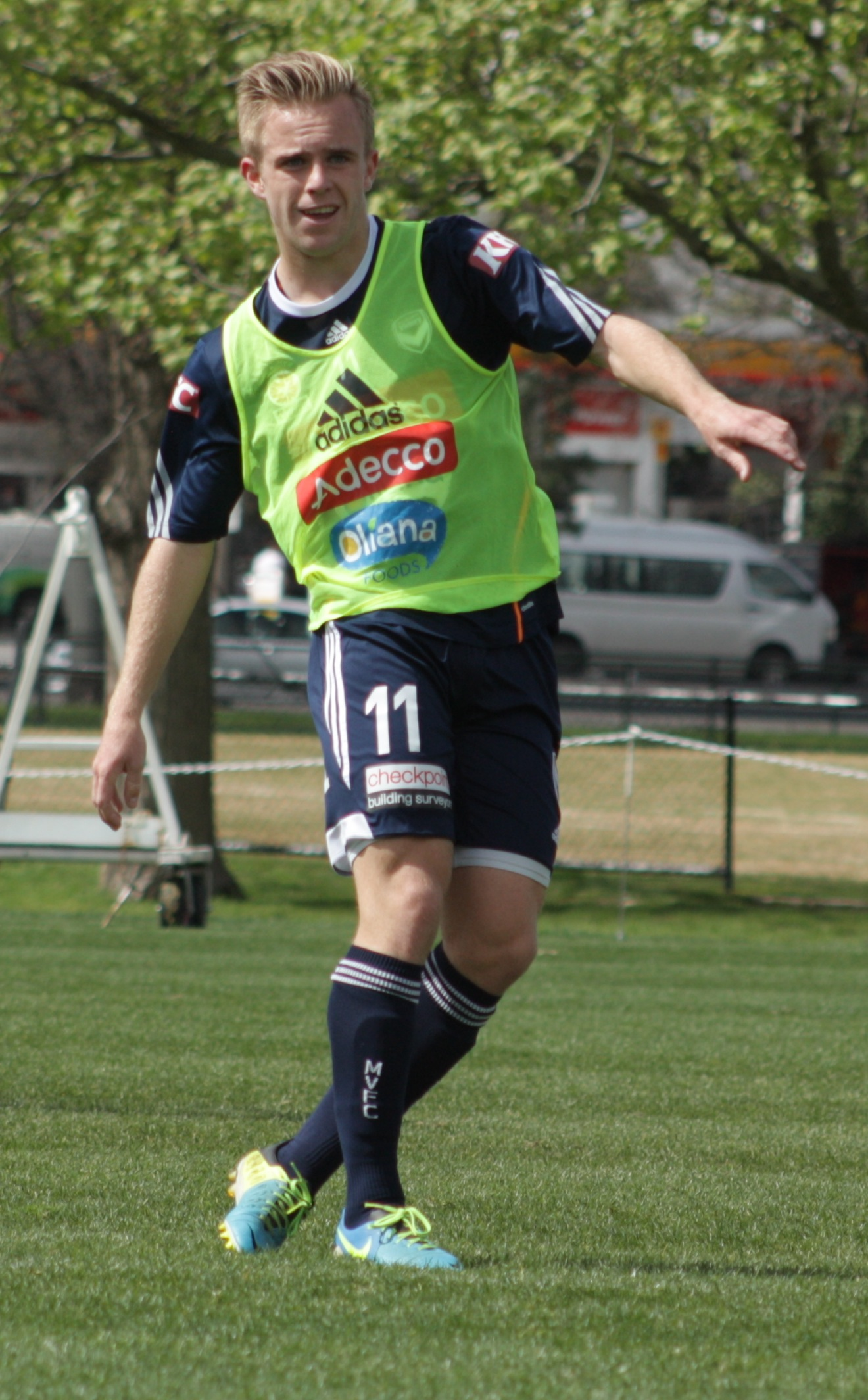
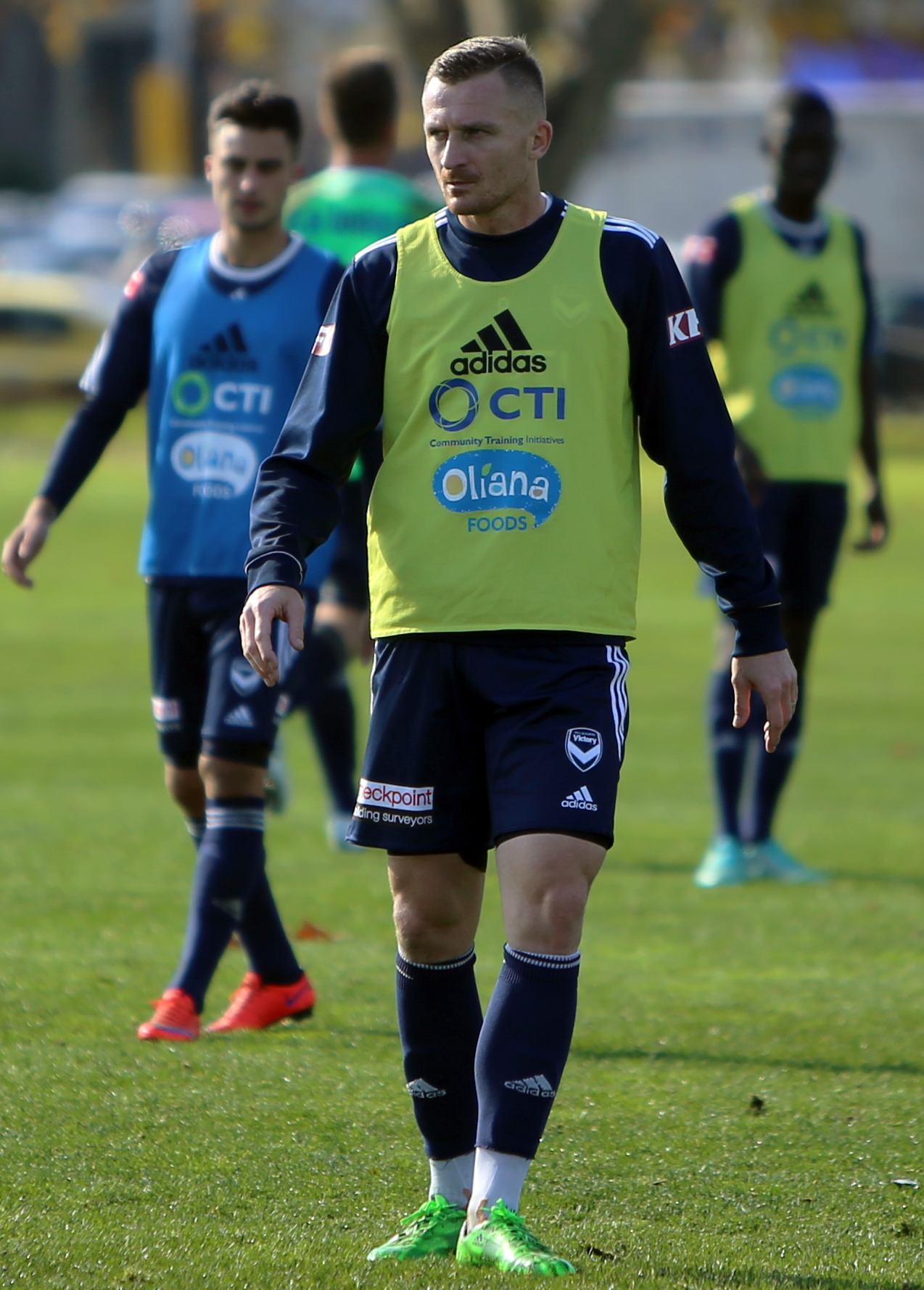
Connor Pain and Besart Berisha have played for both Melbourne Victory and Western United

Eight players have played for both Melbourne Victory and Western United in senior football since 2019, with inaugural Western United squad members Besart Berisha and Connor Pain being the first players to have played for both Melbourne Victory and Western United, with both players starting for Western United in their inaugural A-League match against Wellington Phoenix on 13 October 2019.

Josh Cavallo and Thiel Iradukunda had previously played for Melbourne Victory's youth team before going on to represent Western United's senior team.

Dalibor Markovic was the first player to directly transfer between the two clubs when he signed for Western United from Melbourne Victory midway through the 2020–21 A-League season, while Brendan Hamill became the first player to transfer directly from Western United to Melbourne Victory when he joined the Victory in July 2021.

| Name | Pos | Victory career span | Western United career span |
|---|---|---|---|
| (Australia) Connor Pain | FW | 2013–2018 | 2019–2023 |
| (Kosovo) Besart Berisha | FW | 2014–2016 | 2019–2021 |
| (Australia) Sebastian Pasquali | MF | 2016 | 2019–2025 |
| (Australia) Dalibor Markovic | DF | 2020–2021 | 2021–2023 |
| (Australia) Brendan Hamill | DF | 2021–2022; 2024–present | 2019–2021 |
| (Australia) Christian Theoharous | FW | 2017–2018 | 2021–2023 |
| (Australia) Connor Chapman | DF | 2023–2024 | 2019 |
| (Australia) James Donachie | DF | 2016–2018; 2019; 2019–2020 | 2023–2025 |

== Highest attendances ==
- Melbourne 2–3 Western; 20,865 (2 November 2019); Marvel Stadium
- Melbourne 1–4 Western; 15,349 (21 May 2022); AAMI Park
- Melbourne 3–1 Western; 13,186 (26 December 2021); AAMI Park
- Western 3–1 Melbourne; 10,128 (8 December 2019); GMHBA Stadium
- Western 0–1 Melbourne; 9,157 (13 March 2023); AAMI Park

== Honours ==
=== Men's Football ===
As of 1 October 2022

| Competition | Melbourne Victory | Western United |
|---|---|---|
| A-League Men Premiership | 3 | 0 |
| A-League Men Championship | 4 | 1 |
| Australia Cup | 2 | 0 |
| Total | 10 | 1 |

=== Women's Football ===
As of 24 May 2025

| Competition | Melbourne Victory | Western United |
|---|---|---|
| A-League Women Premiership | 1 | 0 |
| A-League Women Championship | 3 | 0 |
| Total | 4 | 0 |

=== Total Combined ===
| Competition | Melbourne Victory | Western United |
|---|---|---|
| Combined A-League Premiership | 4 | 0 |
| Combined A-League Championship | 7 | 1 |
| Australia Cup | 2 | 0 |
| Total | 13 | 1 |

== See also ==
- Melbourne Derby (A-League Men)
