= Mikayla Vidmar =

Scottish footballer (born 2001)

Personal information
- Date of birth: 2 November 2001 (age 24)
- Place of birth: Glasgow, Scotland
- Position: Defender

Team information
- Current team: Adelaide City

Youth career
- 2016–2017: Canberra United

Senior career*
Years	Team	Apps	(Gls)
2018	SA NTC	18	(0)
2019–2021	Adelaide City	32	(1)
2021–2022	Canberra United	9	(0)
2022	Illawarra Stingrays	9	(0)
2023–	Adelaide City	3	(0)
- * Club domestic league appearances and goals as of 1 September 2023

Mikayla Vidmar (born 2 November 2001) is an Australian footballer who plays as a defender for South Australia club Adelaide City. She is the daughter of Tony Vidmar and niece of Aurelio Vidmar.

== Professional career ==
=== Canberra United ===
Vidmar was a youth player at Canberra United before signing for Adelaide City in 2019 – her father played for the club from 1989 to 1995. She re-signed for Canberra United on 7 October 2021. Vidmar made her A-League Women debut for the club on 23 December 2021 in a 3–3 draw to Brisbane Roar. She made her starting debut at Jubilee Stadium on 15 January 2022 in a 6–0 defeat against Sydney FC.

After making nine appearances for Canberra United, which included seven starts, Vidmar eventually returned to Adelaide City in 2023. She previously had a spell at Illawarra Stingrays in the National Premier Leagues NSW.

== Personal life ==
Vidmar was born in Glasgow, Scotland and is the daughter of former Australian soccer player, Tony Vidmar. She is also the niece of former Australian soccer player, Aurelio Vidmar. Her brother, Kane, plays as a defender for Western United in the A-League Men.
