= Kane Vidmar =

Australian soccer player (born 2004)

Personal information
- Full name: Kane Sebastiano Vidmar
- Date of birth: 4 June 2004 (age 22)
- Place of birth: Cardiff, Wales
- Position: Centre back

Team information
- Current team: West Torrens Birkalla

Youth career
- West Torrens Birkalla
- SA NTC
- 2020–2023: Adelaide United

Senior career*
Years	Team	Apps	(Gls)
2020–2023	Adelaide United NPL	52	(2)
2023–2025	Western United	19	(1)
2026–	West Torrens Birkalla	24	(1)

International career^{‡}
2022	Australia U20	3	(0)
2025–	Australia U23	3	(0)
- * Club domestic league appearances and goals as of 9 July 2025 ‡ National team caps and goals as of 22 October 2026

Kane Sebastiano Vidmar (born 4 June 2004) is an Australian professional soccer player who plays as a centre back for West Torrens Birkalla. Born in Wales, he represents the Australian national team at youth level. He is the son of Tony Vidmar and nephew of Aurelio Vidmar.

== Club career ==
=== Western United ===
A youth product of Adelaide United, Vidmar signed on a two-year scholarship deal to join Western United on 6 July 2023. Vidmar made his senior professional debut as a substitute on 28 October 2023 in a 5–0 league defeat to Western Sydney Wanderers at Western Sydney Stadium. He made his starting debut a week later in a last-minute 1–0 away defeat to Macarthur FC.

== Personal life ==
Vidmar was born in Cardiff, Wales and is the son of former Australian soccer player, Tony Vidmar. His sister, Mikayla, is a footballer who plays for Adelaide City FC in the National Premier Leagues South Australia.
