= Daniel Penha =

Brazilian footballer (born 1998)

Personal information
- Full name: Daniel dos Santos Penha
- Date of birth: 17 October 1998 (age 28)
- Place of birth: Brasília, Brazil
- Height: 1.70 m (5 ft 7 in)
- Position: Attacking midfielder

Team information
- Current team: Avaí (on loan from Atlético Mineiro)
- Number: 14

Youth career
- 2014: Flamengo
- 2015: PSTC
- 2015–2018: Atlético Mineiro

Senior career*
Years	Team	Apps	(Gls)
2016–	Atlético Mineiro	5	(0)
2019	→ CRB (loan)	2	(0)
2020	→ Coimbra (loan)	6	(0)
2020	→ Sampaio Corrêa (loan)	8	(1)
2020–2021	→ Corinthians (loan)	0	(0)
2021	→ Bahia (loan)	12	(1)
2021	→ Confiança (loan)	18	(3)
2021–2022	→ Newcastle Jets (loan)	23	(4)
2022–2023	→ Daegu FC (loan)	10	(1)
2023–2024	→ Western United (loan)	22	(7)
2024–2025	→ Nacional (loan)	30	(4)
2025	→ Dalian Yingbo (loan)	12	(2)
2026–	→ Avaí (loan)	32	(9)

International career
2016	Brazil U20	1	(0)
- * Club domestic league appearances and goals as of 18 November 2026

Daniel dos Santos Penha (born 17 October 1998), commonly known as Daniel Penha, is a Brazilian footballer who plays as an attacking midfielder for Brazilian Série B club Avaí, on loan from Campeonato Brasileiro Série A club Atlético Mineiro.

== Club career ==
=== Atlético Mineiro ===
Born in Brasília, Brazil, Daniel Penha began his football career at Atlético Mineiro in 2015 and was immediately assigned to the under–17 development team. He quickly progressed through the Atlético Mineiro’s academy. He was called up to the first team for the first time, as an unused substitute, in a 2–1 loss against São Paulo on 27 November 2016. Daniel Penha made his professional debut on 9 April 2017, coming on as a late substitute, in a 2–1 loss against Caldense in the Campeonato Mineiro. However, he was sidelined for most of the 2018 season, due to a knee injury.

On 16 January 2019, Daniel Penha signed his professional contract with Atlético Mineiro, keeping him until 2023. Seven days later on 23 January 2019, he made his first team appearance for the club in almost years, starting a match, in a 1–0 loss against Tombense in the Campeonato Mineiro. He later made three more appearances for Atlético Mineiro later in the 2019 season, all of them were in Campeonato Mineiro.

While on loan from Atlético Mineiro, Daniel Penha signed a contract extension with the club on two occasions.

==== Loan spell in Brazil ====
On 5 October 2019, Daniel Penha was loaned out to CRB for the rest of the 2019 season. He made his debut for the club, coming on as a 59th minute substitute, in a 1–0 against Guarani on 12 October 2019. Daniel Penha made two appearances for CRB before returning to his parent club.

On 13 January 2020, Daniel Penha was loaned out to Coimbra, having previously went on a trial. He made his debut for the club, coming on as a 65th minute substitute, in a 0–0 draw against his parent club, Atlético Mineiro, on 30 January 2020. However, the season was interrupted by OVID-19 pandemic and Daniel Penha had to return to his parent club, making only 6 appearances for Coimbra.

On 7 July 2020, Daniel Penha was loaned out to Sampaio Corrêa, having trained with the club. He made his debut for Sampaio Corrêa, starting the whole game, in a 1–0 win against Imperatriz on 1 August 2020. In a follow–up match against Juventude, Daniel Penha scored his first professional goal and set up one of the goals, in a 5–1 win to advance to the knockout stage of the Campeonato Maranhense. After the match, his performance was praised by Globo Esporte and the club, themselves. However, he tested positive for COVID-19, causing him to miss one match. Daniel Penha made return from isolation, coming on as a second–half substitute, in a 2–1 loss against Ponte Preta on 30 August 2020. His next appearance for the club came on 14 October 2020 against Figueirense, where he came on as a late substitute, and set up a goal, in a 3–0 win. Sampaio Corrêa announced on 27 October 2020 that the club terminated Daniel Penha’s loan deal, allowing him to return to his parent club. By the time he left the club, Daniel Penha made 8 appearances and scoring once. Shortly after, he had a brief spell Corinthians, without making a first team appearance.

On 1 February 2021, Daniel Penha left Corinthians to join Bahia on loan. He made his debut for the club, starting a match, in a 2–1 loss against Juazeirense. In a follow–up match against Doce Mel, Daniel Penha scored his first goal for Bahia, in a 2–-0 win. Following this, he became involved in the first team, playing in the left–wing position. On 25 May 2021, his loan spell at the club ended, where Daniel Penha made 12 appearances and scoring once.

Shortly after leaving Bahia, Daniel Penha joined Confiança on loan the next day. Three days later on 29 May 2021, he scored on his debut for the club, in a 3–1 win against Cruzeiro. Since joining Confiança, Daniel Penha was a first team regular, rotating in midfield and winger positions. He then scored two goals in two matches between 10 July 2021 and 14 July 2021 against Vitória and Avaí. On 16 August 2021, Daniel Penha’s loan spell at the club was terminated and returned to his parent club. By the time he left Confiança, Daniel Penha made 18 appearances and scoring 2 times in all competitions.

==== Loan spell at Newcastle Jets ====
On 20 August 2021, Daniel Penha moved abroad for the first time when he joined A-League Men side Newcastle Jets on loan for the 2021–22 season.

He scored on his debut for the club, in a 2–1 loss against Western United in the seventh round of the FFA Cup. In a match against Sydney FC on 4 December 2021, Daniel Penha set up two goals for Valentino Yuel, in a 2–2 draw. In a follow–up match against Wellington Phoenix, he scored and set up one of the goals, in a 4–0 win. Since joining Newcastle Jets, Daniel Penha quickly established himself in the first team, where he played in attacking midfield role and also began assisting goals. Daniel Penha scored his second goal for the club on 9 March 2022 when and set up the equalising goal in an eventual 3–2 loss against Wellington Phoenix. However in a match against Perth Glory on 30 March 2022, he received a straight red card at stoppage time, in a 0–0 draw. After the match, it was announced that Daniel Penha would have to serve a one match suspension. Despite this, he was named Newcastle Jets’ Player of the month of March for his performance.

Daniel Penha scored twice on his return from suspension, in a 6–1 win against Perth Glory on 10 April 2022. However, his return was short–lived when he received a red card for a second bookable offence at stoppage time after elbowing Harry Steele, in a 4–2 loss against Central Coast Mariners on 23 April 2022. After the match, it was announced that Daniel Penha would serve a two match suspension. On the last game of the 2021–22 season, he made his return from suspension, in a 2–0 loss against Central Coast Mariners. On 12 May 2022, Penha scored his sixth goal for the club, in a 3–1 win against Perth Glory in the Australia Cup preliminary rounds. Shortly after, he was selected for the A-League All-Stars team.

At the end of the 2021–22 season, Daniel Penha made 25 appearances and scoring 6 times in all competitions, as well as, having the highest assist with 11. At Newcastle Jets’ award ceremony, he was awarded the club’s Men’s Goal of the Year, which came against Western United. Daniel Penha was also named PFA Footballer of the Year Awards. Despite hopes of him staying at Newcastle Jets beyond next season, he announced his departure from the club on 23 June 2022. Website Roar Guru said about Daniel Penha, saying: "He has been outstanding in a Jets side that blows hot and cold, but the team take a lot of solace in the way they play. The Jets have been one of the best sides to watch this campaign. Penha is well known for his dead-ball skills and ability to split defences open with his precise passing. His overall attacking play is excellent and he has the flair and creativity to bamboozle opponents. He’s also not afraid to mix it up with the physical side of football and energetically presses well from the front. "

==== Loan spell at Daegu FC ====
On 18 June 2022, there was reports in South Korea that Daegu FC were interested in signing Daniel Penha. The move was confirmed on 6 July 2022 when he signed for the club and was a given a number 70 shirt.

He made his Daegu FC debut, starting a match, in a 2–1 loss against FC Seoul on 16 July 2022. In a follow–up match against Suwon FC, Daniel Penha scored his first goal for the club, in a 2–2 draw. However, he suffered a cruciate ligament injury that impacted his time at Daegu FC. As a result, Daniel Penha made 10 appearances and scoring once for the club. On 30 June 2023, Daegu FC announced that he would be leaving the club.

==== Loan spell at Western United ====
On 19 July 2023, Daniel Penha returned to Australia to join Western United on loan.

After being out for a month due to maintaining his fitness from a cruciate ligament injury, he eventually made his debut for the club, coming on as a 59th minute, in a 3–0 loss against Sydney FC in the quarter–finals of the Australian Cup. Since joining Western United, Daniel Penha became a first team regular, playing in the winger position. He scored his first goal for the club, scoring from a penalty, in an eventual 2–1 win against Brisbane Roar on 15 December 2023. A month later on 12 January 2024, Daniel Penha scored a brace, in a 3–3 draw against Macarthur FC. He then scored two goals in two matches between 16 February 2024 and 20 February 2024 against his former club, Newcastle Jets, and Melbourne Victory. However, Daniel Penha suffered ankle injury while celebrating a goal and was substituted as a result, leading him to be out for one match. He made his return from injury, coming on as a 64th minute substitute, in a 1–0 win against Perth Glory on 2 March 2024. Daniel Penha followed up the next two matches by scoring two goals, coming against Western Sydney Wanderers and Melbourne Victory. However during a 4–2 win against Macarthur FC on 6 April 2024, he suffered a groin injury and was substituted at half time, in what turns out to be his last appearance for Western United. At the end of the 2023–24 season, Daniel Penha made 23 appearances and scoring 7 times in all competitions.

He was initially selected for the A-League All-Stars team for the second time, but withdraw from the squad, due to "personal reasons". For his performance, Daniel Penha was awarded the club’s Player of the Season, Golden Boot, Fans’ Goals of the Season and Club Persons of the Season. On 12 July 2024, it was announced that he would be leaving Western United to return to his home country.

=== Loan spell at Nacional ===
On 15 July 2024, Daniel Penha moved abroad once again when was loaned out to Primeira Liga club Nacional for the 2024–25 season.

Daniel Penha made his debut for the club, coming on as a 58th-minute substitute, in a 1–1 draw against AVS in the opening game of the season. On 1 September 2024, he scored his first goal for Nacional, in a 2–0 win to give the club their first win of the season.

=== Loan spell at Dalian Yingbo ===
On 7 July 2025, Daniel Penha joined Chinese Super League club Dalian Yingbo on a one-year loan deal.

=== Loan spell at Avaí ===
On 9 January 2026 Daniel Penha joined Brazilian Série B club Avaí on a one-year loan deal.

== Personal life ==
Daniel Penha is married and it was revealed that his wife is suffering from cancer. In April 2024, he expressed interest in playing for the Australia national team.

== Career statistics ==
=== Club ===
As of match played 22 November 2025

Club	Season	League			State league		National cup (Note: Includes Copa do Brasil, Australia Cup, Korea Cup, Taça de Portugal and Chinese FA Cup)		Continental		Other		Total	
Club	Season	Division	Apps	Goals	Apps	Goals	Apps	Goals	Apps	Goals	Apps	Goals	Apps	Goals
Atlético Mineiro	2017	Série A	0	0	1 (Note: Appearance(s) in Campeonato Mineiro)	0	0	0	0	0	—		1	0
Atlético Mineiro	2018	Série A	0	0	0	0	0	0	0	0	—		0	0
Atlético Mineiro	2019	Série A	0	0	4	0	0	0	0	0	—		4	0
Atlético Mineiro	2020	Série A	0	0	0	0	0	0	0	0	—		0	0
Atlético Mineiro	2021	Série A	0	0	0	0	0	0	0	0	—		0	0
Atlético Mineiro	2022	Série A	0	0	0	0	0	0	0	0	0	0	0	0
Atlético Mineiro	2023	Série A	0	0	0	0	0	0	0	0	—		0	0
Atlético Mineiro	2024	Série A	0	0	0	0	0	0	0	0	—		0	0
Atlético Mineiro	2025	Série A	0	0	0	0	0	0	0	0	—		0	0
Atlético Mineiro	Total		0	0	5	0	0	0	0	0	0	0	5	0
CRB (loan)	2019	Série B	2	0	0	0	0	0	—		—		2	0
Coimbra (loan)	2020	—			6	0	—		—		—		6	0
Sampaio Corrêa (loan)	2020	Série B	4	0	0	0	0	0	—		—		4	0
Bahia (loan)	2021	Série A	0	0	11 (Note: Appearance(s) in Campeonato Baiano)	1	0	0	0	0	2 (Note: Appearance(s) in Copa do Nordeste)	0	13	1
Confiança (loan)	2021	Série B	16	2	0	0	0	0	—		—		16	2
Newcastle Jets (loan)	2021–22	A-League	23	4	—		2	2	—		—		25	6
Daegu (loan)	2022	K League 1	10	1	—		0	0	1 (Note: Appearance(s) in AFC Champions League)	0	—		11	1
Western United (loan)	2023–24	A-League	22	7	—		1	0	—		—		23	7
Nacional (loan)	2024–25	Primeira Liga	30	4	—		1	0	—		1 (Note: Appearance(s) in Taça da Liga)	0	32	4
Dalian Yingbo (loan)	2025	Chinese Super League	12	2	—		0	0	—		—		12	2
Career total			119	20	22	1	4	2	1	0	3	0	146	23

== Honours ==
Atlético Mineiro

- Campeonato Mineiro: 2017

Sampaio Corrêa

- Campeonato Maranhense: 2020

Bahia

- Copa do Nordeste: 2021

Avaí

- Recopa Catarinense: 2025
- Copa Sul-Sudeste: 2025

Individual

- A-Leagues All Star: 2022
- PFA A-League Men Team of the Season: 2021–22
