= 2024 A-League Men finals series =

A-League Men finals series
- Season: 2023–24
- Dates: 4–25 May 2024
- Champions: Central Coast Mariners
- Matches: 7
- Goals: 12 (1.71 per match)
- Top goalscorer: Ryan Edmondson; Róbert Mak (2 goals each)
- Biggest home win: Sydney FC 4–0 Macarthur FC (Elimination-finals, 4 May 2024)
- Biggest away win: Sydney FC 1–2 Central Coast Mariners (Semi-finals, 10 May 2024); Wellington Phoenix 1–2 Melbourne Victory (Semi-finals, 18 May 2024)
- Highest scoring: Sydney FC 4–0 Macarthur FC (Elimination-finals, 4 May 2024)
- Highest attendance: 33,297; Wellington Phoenix 1–2 Melbourne Victory (Semi-finals, 18 May 2024)
- Lowest attendance: 11,792; Sydney FC 4–0 Macarthur FC (Elimination-finals, 4 May 2024)
- Total attendance: 138,011
- Average attendance: 19,716

The 2024 A-League Men finals series was the 19th annual edition of A-League finals series, the playoffs tournament staged to determine the champion of the 2023–24 A-League Men season. The series was played over four weeks culminating in the 2024 A-League Men Grand Final.

On 18 October 2023, the decision to host the 2023, 2024 and 2025 A-League Men Grand Finals in Sydney was reversed and renegotiated into Unite Round.

== Qualification ==
The top two teams; Central Coast Mariners and Wellington Phoenix, qualify directly for the semi-finals. The teams placed third through to sixth play in the elimination-finals, with the third and fourth placed teams; Melbourne Victory and Sydney FC, hosting the matches.

Pos	Team	Pld	W	D	L	GF	GA	GD	Pts	Qualification
1	Central Coast Mariners (C)	27	17	4	6	49	27	+22	55	Qualification for AFC Champions League Elite and Finals series
2	Wellington Phoenix (Note: Wellington Phoenix cannot qualify for Asian Football Confederation competitions as they are based in New Zealand, which is part of the Oceania Football Confederation.)	27	15	8	4	42	26	+16	53	Qualification for Finals series (Note: The top two teams enter the finals series at the semi-finals, while the teams ranked third to sixth enter the finals series at the elimination-finals.)
3	Melbourne Victory	27	10	12	5	43	33	+10	42	Qualification for Finals series
4	Sydney FC	27	12	5	10	52	41	+11	41	Qualification for AFC Champions League Two and Finals series (Note: Qualified for AFC Champions League Two as the 2023 Australia Cup winners.)
5	Macarthur FC	27	11	8	8	45	48	−3	41	Qualification for Finals series
6	Melbourne City	27	11	6	10	50	38	+12	39	Qualification for Finals series
7	Western Sydney Wanderers	27	11	4	12	44	48	−4	37	
8	Adelaide United	27	9	5	13	52	53	−1	32	
9	Brisbane Roar	27	8	6	13	42	55	−13	30	Qualification for 2024 Australia Cup play-offs
10	Newcastle Jets	27	6	10	11	39	47	−8	28	Qualification for 2024 Australia Cup play-offs
11	Western United	27	7	5	15	36	55	−19	26	Qualification for 2024 Australia Cup play-offs
12	Perth Glory	27	5	7	15	46	69	−23	22	Qualification for 2024 Australia Cup play-offs

Source: A-Leagues
Rules for classification: 1) points; 2) wins; 3) goal difference; 4) goals scored; 5) head-to-head results; 5a) head-to-head points; 5b) head-to-head goal difference; 6) Fair Play points; 7) away goal difference; 8) away goals per match; 9) home goal difference; 10) home goals per match; 11) toss of a coin in an event of a tie of two clubs.
(C) Champions

== Venues ==
This year would see the first finals match played in New Zealand since 2015.

Melbourne	2024 A-League Men finals series is located in Australia 2024 A-League Men finals series is located in New Zealand	Gosford
AAMI Park	2024 A-League Men finals series is located in Australia 2024 A-League Men finals series is located in New Zealand	Industree Group Stadium
Capacity: 30,050	2024 A-League Men finals series is located in Australia 2024 A-League Men finals series is located in New Zealand	Capacity: 20,059
Sydney	2024 A-League Men finals series is located in Australia 2024 A-League Men finals series is located in New Zealand	Wellington
Allianz Stadium	2024 A-League Men finals series is located in Australia 2024 A-League Men finals series is located in New Zealand	Sky Stadium
Capacity: 42,500	2024 A-League Men finals series is located in Australia 2024 A-League Men finals series is located in New Zealand	Capacity: 34,500

== Bracket ==
The system used for the 2024 A-League Men finals series is the modified top-six play-offs by the A-Leagues. The top two teams enter the two-legged semi-finals receiving the bye for the elimination-finals in which the teams from third placed to sixth place enter the elimination-finals with "third against sixth" and "fourth against fifth". Losers for the elimination-finals are eliminated, and winners qualify for the two-legged semi-finals.

First placed team in the semi-finals plays the lowest ranked elimination-final winning team and secon placed team in the semi-finals plays the highest ranked elimination-final winner. Home-state advantage goes to the team with the higher ladder position.

Elimination-finals
4	Sydney FC	4
5	Macarthur FC	0
3	Melbourne Victory (p)	1 (3)
6	Melbourne City	1 (2)

Semi-finals
4	Sydney FC	1	0	1
1	Central Coast Mariners	2	0	2
3	Melbourne Victory (a.e.t.)	0	2	2
2	Wellington Phoenix	0	1	1

Grand final
1	Central Coast Mariners (a.e.t.)	3
3	Melbourne Victory	1

== Elimination-finals ==
=== Sydney FC vs Macarthur FC ===
This was the 11th overall meeting between the two teams and their first in the finals series.

4 May 2024
19:45 AEST (UTC+10:00)

Sydney FC	4–0	Macarthur FC
Mak 8', 78'; Lolley 50'; Kucharski 67'	Report

Allianz Stadium, Sydney
Attendance: 11,792
Referee: Alireza Faghani

Sydney	Macarthur

GK	1	(Australia) Andrew Redmayne
RB	23	(Australia) Rhyan Grant
CB	27	(Australia) Hayden Matthews
CB	6	(England) Jack Rodwell		(substituted off) 75'
LB	16	(Australia) Joel King
RM	10	(England) Joe Lolley	(yellow card) 29'	(substituted off) 52'
CM	12	(Australia) Corey Hollman		(substituted off) 46'
CM	26	(Australia) Luke Brattan		(substituted off) 85'
LM	4	(Australia) Jordan Courtney-Perkins
RF	11	(Slovakia) Róbert Mak		(substituted off) 85'
LF	17	(Australia) Anthony Caceres
Substitutions:
MF	22	(Australia) Max Burgess		(substituted on) 46'
FW	25	(Australia) Jaiden Kucharski		(substituted on) 52'
MF	8	(Australia) Jake Girdwood-Reich		(substituted on) 75'
FW	9	(Brazil) Fábio Gomes		(substituted on) 85'
FW	13	(Australia) Patrick Wood		(substituted on) 85'
DF	15	(Brazil) Gabriel Lacerda
GK	20	(Australia) Adam Pavlesic
Manager:
(Australia) Ufuk Talay

GK	12	(Poland) Filip Kurto
RB	20	(Australia) Kealey Adamson	(red card) 27'
CB	6	(Australia) Tomislav Uskok
CB	3	(New Zealand) Tommy Smith
LB	13	(Australia) Ivan Vujica
DM	23	(New Zealand) Clayton Lewis		(substituted off) 57'
DM	15	(Australia) Kearyn Baccus		(substituted off) 68'
RM	17	(Australia) Raphael Borges Rodrigues		(substituted off) 57'
CM	10	(Mexico) Ulises Dávila
LM	37	(Australia) Jed Drew		(substituted off) 46'
CF	98	(France) Valère Germain		(substituted off) 75'
Substitutions:
DF	18	(Australia) Walter Scott		(substituted on) 46'
MF	7	(Australia) Daniel De Silva		(substituted on) 57'
MF	8	(Australia) Jake Hollman	(yellow card) 83'	(substituted on) 57'
FW	31	(Australia) Lachlan Rose		(substituted on) 68'
DF	44	(Australia) Matthew Millar		(substituted on) 75'
MF	24	(Tanzania) Charles M'Mombwa
GK	1	(Australia) Danijel Nizic
Manager:
(Australia) Mile Sterjovski

Assistant referees:
Brad Wright
Arvin Shanmuganathan
Fourth official:
Adam Kersey
Video assistant referee:
Kate Jacewicz
Assistant video assistant referees:
Kris Griffiths-Jones
Richard Naumovski

=== Melbourne Victory vs Melbourne City ===
This was the 45th overall meeting between the two teams, their second finals meeting, and the first finals meeting to be played at AAMI Park. The last time a Melbourne Derby was contested in the finals series was in 2015, which Melbourne Victory won 3–0.

5 May 2024
17:00 AEST (UTC+10:00)

Melbourne Victory	1–1 (a.e.t.)	Melbourne City
Velupillay 88'	Report	Souprayen 29'
Penalties
Miranda (penalty scored); Da Silva (penalty scored); Izzo (penalty scored); Broxham (penalty missed)	3–2	(penalty scored) Natel; (penalty missed) Antonis; (penalty missed) Talbot; (penalty scored) Caputo; (penalty missed) Jeggo

AAMI Park, Melbourne
Attendance: 21,358
Referee: Alex King

Melbourne; Victory	Melbourne; City

GK	20	(Australia) Paul Izzo
RB	2	(Australia) Jason Geria		(substituted off) 120+2'
CB	5	(France) Damien Da Silva	(yellow card) 115'
CB	21	(Portugal) Roderick Miranda
LB	3	(Ivory Coast) Adama Traoré		(substituted off) 85'
DM	25	(Australia) Ryan Teague
DM	22	(Australia) Jake Brimmer		(substituted off) 68'
RM	19	(Australia) Daniel Arzani	(yellow card) 11'	(substituted off) 80'
CM	8	(France) Zinédine Machach	(red card) 37'
LM	11	(Australia) Ben Folami		(substituted off) 68'
CF	10	(Australia) Bruno Fornaroli	(yellow card) 50'	(substituted off) 80'
Substitutions:
MF	27	(Australia) Jordi Valadon		(substituted on) 68'
FW	17	(Australia) Nishan Velupillay		(substituted on) 68'
MF	7	(Australia) Chris Ikonomidis		(substituted on) 80'
MF	23	(Tunisia) Salim Khelifi		(substituted on) 80'
FW	37	(Australia) Kasey Bos		(substituted on) 85'
MF	6	(Australia) Leigh Broxham		(substituted on) 120+2'
GK	40	(Australia) Christian Siciliano
Manager:
(Australia) Tony Popovic

GK	1	(England) Jamie Young
RB	6	(Australia) Steven Ugarkovic
CB	22	(Australia) Curtis Good	(yellow card) 102' (yellow-red card) 118'
CB	26	(France) Samuel Souprayen	(yellow card) 5'
LB	14	(Chile) Vicente Fernández		(substituted off) 75'
DM	7	(Australia) Mathew Leckie		(substituted off) 114'
DM	8	(Australia) Jimmy Jeggo	(yellow card) 38'
RM	44	(Croatia) Marin Jakoliš		(substituted off) 109'
CM	10	(Germany) Tolgay Arslan		(substituted off) 75'
LM	11	(Brazil) Léo Natel
CF	9	(Australia) Jamie Maclaren	(yellow card) 41'	(substituted off) 75'
Substitutions:
MF	17	(Australia) Terry Antonis	(yellow card) 90+2'	(substituted on) 75'
FW	37	(Australia) Max Caputo		(substituted on) 75'
DF	25	(Australia) Callum Talbot		(substituted on) 75'
MF	21	(Australia) Alessandro Lopane		(substituted on) 109'
MF	35	(Australia) Zane Schreiber		(substituted on) 114'
GK	33	(Australia) Patrick Beach
DF	2	(Australia) Scott Galloway
Manager:
(Australia) Aurelio Vidmar

Assistant referees:
Kearney Robinson
Andrew Lindsay
Fourth official:
Daniel Elder
Video assistant referee:
Kris Griffiths-Jones
Assistant video assistant referees:
Kate Jacewicz
Richard Naumovski

== Semi-finals ==
Team 1	Agg.	Team 2	1st leg	2nd leg
Central Coast Mariners	2–1	Sydney FC	2–1	0–0
Wellington Phoenix	1–2	Melbourne Victory	0–0	1–2 (a.e.t.)

=== Sydney FC vs Central Coast Mariners ===
10 May 2024
19:45 AEST (UTC+10:00)

Sydney FC	1–2	Central Coast Mariners
King 25'	Report	Nisbet 45+3'; Doka 56' (pen.)

Allianz Stadium, Sydney
Attendance: 13,813
Referee: Ben Abraham

Sydney	Central Coast; Mariners

GK	1	(Australia) Andrew Redmayne
RB	16	(Australia) Joel King
CB	27	(Australia) Hayden Matthews
CB	6	(England) Jack Rodwell	(red card) 63'
CB	8	(Australia) Jake Girdwood-Reich		(substituted off) 19'
RB	23	(Australia) Rhyan Grant
RM	12	(Australia) Corey Hollman	(yellow card) 40' (yellow-red card) 82'
CM	26	(Australia) Luke Brattan
LM	4	(Australia) Jordan Courtney-Perkins		(substituted off) 46'
RF	17	(Australia) Anthony Caceres
LF	11	(Slovakia) Róbert Mak		(substituted off) 84'
Substitutes:
MF	22	(Australia) Max Burgess		(substituted on) 19'	(substituted off) 64'
FW	9	(Brazil) Fábio Gomes		(substituted on) 46'
DF	15	(Brazil) Gabriel Lacerda		(substituted on) 64'
DF	3	(Australia) Aaron Gurd		(substituted on) 84'
FW	25	(Australia) Jaiden Kucharski
GK	20	(Australia) Adam Pavlesic
FW	13	(Australia) Patrick Wood
Manager:
(Australia) Ufuk Talay

GK	20	(Australia) Danny Vukovic
RB	15	(New Zealand) Storm Roux
CB	23	(Fiji) Dan Hall
CB	3	(Vanuatu) Brian Kaltak
LB	18	(Australia) Jacob Farrell
RM	2	(Brazil) Mikael Doka
CM	26	(Malaysia) Brad Tapp		(substituted off) 84'
CM	6	(Australia) Max Balard
LM	7	(Australia) Christian Theoharous		(substituted off) 68'
RF	9	(Australia) Alou Kuol	(yellow card) 20'	(substituted off) 76'
LF	4	(Australia) Josh Nisbet
Substitutes:
FW	22	(Brazil) Ronald Barcellos		(substituted on) 68'
FW	99	(England) Ryan Edmondson		(substituted on) 76'
MF	37	(Australia) Bailey Brandtman		(substituted on) 84'
FW	17	(Australia) Jing Reec
DF	33	(Australia) Nathan Paull
MF	16	(Australia) Harry Steele
GK	30	(Australia) Jack Warshawsky
Manager:
(England) Mark Jackson

Assistant referees:
Matthew McOrist
Andrej Giev
Fourth official:
Alireza Faghani
Video assistant referee:
Kris Griffiths-Jones
Assistant video assistant referees:
Lara Lee
Richard Naumovski

=== Central Coast Mariners vs Sydney FC ===
18 May 2024
19:45 AEST (UTC+10:00)

Central Coast Mariners	0–0	Sydney FC
	Report

Industree Group Stadium, Gosford
Attendance: 20,059
Referee: Alireza Faghani

GK	20	(Australia) Danny Vukovic
RB	15	(New Zealand) Storm Roux	(yellow card) 41'
CB	23	(Fiji) Dan Hall
CB	3	(Vanuatu) Brian Kaltak
LB	18	(Australia) Jacob Farrell	(yellow card) 90+7'
RM	2	(Brazil) Mikael Doka	(yellow card) 90+6'
CM	26	(Malaysia) Brad Tapp		(substituted off) 76'
CM	6	(Australia) Max Balard
LM	7	(Australia) Christian Theoharous	(yellow card) 25'	(substituted off) 58'
RF	9	(Australia) Alou Kuol	(substituted off) 58'
LF	4	(Australia) Josh Nisbet
Substitutes:
FW	22	(Brazil) Ronald Barcellos
FW	99	(England) Ryan Edmondson		(substituted on) 58'
MF	39	(Australia) Miguel Di Pizio		(substituted on) 58'
FW	17	(Australia) Jing Reec
DF	33	(Australia) Nathan Paull
MF	16	(Australia) Harry Steele	(substituted on) 76'
GK	30	(Australia) Jack Warshawsky
Manager:
(England) Mark Jackson

GK	1	(Australia) Andrew Redmayne
RB	23	(Australia) Rhyan Grant
CB	27	(Australia) Hayden Matthews
CB	15	(Brazil) Gabriel Lacerda
LB	16	(Australia) Joel King
DM	26	(Australia) Luke Brattan
DM	17	(Australia) Anthony Caceres	(yellow card) 45+3'	(red card) 90+8'
RM	22	(Australia) Max Burgess	(substituted off) 90'
AM	11	(Slovakia) Róbert Mak
LM	4	(Australia) Jordan Courtney-Perkins		(substituted off) 70'
FW	9	(Brazil) Fábio Gomes
Substitutes:
GK	20	(Australia) Adam Pavlesic
DF	3	(Australia) Aaron Gurd
DF	8	(Australia) Jordan Courtney-Perkins
MF	18	(Australia) Matthew Scarcella
FW	25	(Australia) Jaiden Kucharski	(substituted on) 90'
FW	19	(Australia) Mitchell Glasson
FW	13	(Australia) Patrick Wood	(substituted on) 70'
Manager:
(Australia) Ufuk Talay

Assistant referees:
Kearney Robinson
Arvin Shanmuganathan
Fourth official:
Jonathan Barreiro
Video assistant referee:
Kate Jacewicz
Assistant video assistant referees:
Kris Griffiths-Jones
Richard Naumovski

=== Melbourne Victory vs Wellington Phoenix ===
12 May 2024
16:00 AEST (UTC+10:00)

Melbourne Victory	0–0	Wellington Phoenix
	Report

AAMI Park, Melbourne
Attendance: 16,313
Referee: Adam Kersey

Melbourne; Victory	Wellington; Phoenix

GK	20	(Australia) Paul Izzo
RB	2	(Australia) Jason Geria
CB	5	(France) Damien Da Silva
CB	21	(Portugal) Roderick Miranda
LB	3	(Ivory Coast) Adama Traoré
DM	27	(Australia) Jordi Valadon		(substituted off) 61'
DM	25	(Australia) Ryan Teague
RM	17	(Australia) Nishan Velupillay		(substituted off) 60'
CM	28	(Curaçao) Roly Bonevacia		(substituted off) 79'
LM	23	(Tunisia) Salim Khelifi		(substituted off) 60'
CF	10	(Australia) Bruno Fornaroli		(substituted off) 89'
Substitutes:
FW	19	(Australia) Daniel Arzani	(yellow card) 88'	(substituted on) 60'
FW	11	(Australia) Ben Folami		(substituted on) 60'
MF	22	(Australia) Jake Brimmer		(substituted on) 61'
MF	7	(Australia) Chris Ikonomidis		(substituted on) 79'
DF	14	(Australia) Connor Chapman		(substituted on) 89'
FW	37	(Australia) Kasey Bos
GK	40	(Australia) Christian Siciliano
Manager:
(Australia) Tony Popovic

GK	40	(New Zealand) Alex Paulsen
RB	6	(New Zealand) Tim Payne
CB	3	(New Zealand) Finn Surman
CB	4	(England) Scott Wootton
LB	19	(New Zealand) Sam Sutton
RM	15	(Australia) Nicholas Pennington	(yellow card) 52'	(substituted off) 76'
CM	14	(New Zealand) Alex Rufer	(yellow card) 90+5'
LM	8	(New Zealand) Ben Old		(substituted off) 90+5'
AM	11	(Bulgaria) Bozhidar Kraev		(substituted off) 77'
AM	10	(England) David Ball	(yellow card) 41'	(substituted off) 65'
CF	7	(New Zealand) Kosta Barbarouses
Substitutes:
FW	24	(New Zealand) Oskar van Hattum		(substituted on) 65'
FW	9	(Poland) Oskar Zawada		(substituted on) 76'
MF	17	(Costa Rica) Youstin Salas		(substituted on) 77'
MF	12	(Iraq) Mohamed Al-Taay		(substituted on) 90+5'
GK	25	(Australia) Jack Duncan
DF	26	(New Zealand) Isaac Hughes
DF	18	(New Zealand) Lukas Kelly-Heald
Manager:
(Australia) Giancarlo Italiano

Assistant referees:
Hugh Fenton-White
Joey Lee
Fourth official:
Jonathan Barreiro
Video assistant referee:
Alex King
Assistant video assistant referees:
Casey Reibelt
Kearney Robinson

=== Wellington Phoenix vs Melbourne Victory ===
18 May 2024
18:30 NZST (UTC+12:00)

Wellington Phoenix	1–2 (a.e.t.)	Melbourne Victory
Zawada 90+9'	Report	Traoré 82'; Ikonomidis 102'

Sky Stadium, Wellington
Attendance: 33,297
Referee: Daniel Elder

Wellington; Phoenix	Melbourne; Victory

GK	40	(New Zealand) Alex Paulsen
RB	6	(New Zealand) Tim Payne		(substituted off) 111'
CB	3	(New Zealand) Finn Surman		(substituted off) 111'
CB	4	(England) Scott Wootton
LB	19	(New Zealand) Sam Sutton		(substituted off) 111'
RM	15	(Australia) Nicholas Pennington		(substituted off) 85'
CM	14	(New Zealand) Alex Rufer
LM	8	(New Zealand) Ben Old
AM	11	(Bulgaria) Bozhidar Kraev		(substituted off) 73'
AM	10	(England) David Ball		(substituted off) 66'
CF	7	(New Zealand) Kosta Barbarouses
Substitutes:
FW	24	(New Zealand) Oskar van Hattum		(substituted on) 66'
FW	9	(Poland) Oskar Zawada		(substituted on) 73'
MF	17	(Costa Rica) Youstin Salas	(yellow card) 90+1'	(substituted on) 85'
MF	12	(Iraq) Mohamed Al-Taay		(substituted on) 111'
DF	26	(New Zealand) Isaac Hughes		(substituted on) 111'
DF	18	(New Zealand) Lukas Kelly-Heald		(substituted on) 111'
GK	25	(Australia) Jack Duncan
Manager:
(Australia) Giancarlo Italiano

GK	20	(Australia) Paul Izzo
RB	2	(Australia) Jason Geria
CB	5	(France) Damien Da Silva
CB	21	(Portugal) Roderick Miranda
LB	3	(Ivory Coast) Adama Traoré		(substituted off) 120'
DM	27	(Australia) Jordi Valadon		(substituted off) 65'
DM	25	(Australia) Ryan Teague
RM	17	(Australia) Nishan Velupillay		(substituted off) 66'
CM	28	(Curaçao) Roly Bonevacia		(substituted off) 86'
LM	19	(Australia) Daniel Arzani	(yellow card) 30'	(substituted off) 66'
CF	10	(Australia) Bruno Fornaroli		(substituted off) 90+5'
Substitutes:
MF	22	(Australia) Jake Brimmer		(substituted on) 65'
FW	11	(Australia) Ben Folami		(substituted on) 66'
MF	23	(Tunisia) Salim Khelifi		(substituted on) 66'
DF	14	(Australia) Connor Chapman	(yellow card) 97'	(substituted on) 86'
MF	7	(Australia) Chris Ikonomidis		(substituted on) 90+5'
FW	37	(Australia) Kasey Bos		(substituted on) 120'
GK	40	(Australia) Christian Siciliano
Manager:
(Australia) Tony Popovic

Assistant referees:
Andrew Meimarakis
Andrew Lindsay
Fourth official:
Ben Abraham
Video assistant referee:
Shaun Evans
Assistant video assistant referees:
Alex King
Richard Naumovski

== Grand Final ==
25 May 2024
19:45 AEST (UTC+10:00)

Central Coast Mariners	3–1 (a.e.t.)	Melbourne Victory
Edmondson 90+1', 120+1'; Di Pizio 97'	Report	Geria 50'

Central Coast Stadium, Gosford
Attendance: 21,379
Referee: Alex King
