= 2023–24 Sydney FC season =

Sydney FC 2023-24 Season

Sydney FC
2023–24 season
- Chairman: Scott Barlow
- Manager: Steve Corica (until 7 November 2023); Ufuk Talay (from 8 November 2023)
- Stadium: Allianz Stadium
- A-League Men: 4th
- A-League Men Finals: Semi-finals
- Australia Cup: Winners
- Top goalscorer: League: Fábio Gomes; Joe Lolley (11 each); All: Joe Lolley (14)
- Highest home attendance: 28,152 vs. Western Sydney Wanderers (25 November 2023); A-League Men
- Lowest home attendance: 2,540 vs. Central Coast Mariners (13 August 2023); Australia Cup
- Average home league attendance: 14,476
- Biggest win: 7–1 vs. Perth Glory (H) (28 April 2024); A-League Men
- Biggest defeat: 0–3 vs. Brisbane Roar (A) (27 October 2023); A-League Men; 0–3 vs. Melbourne Victory (A) (16 December 2023); A-League Men
Home colours	Away colours	Third colours
- All statistics correct as of 4 May 2024.

The 2023–24 season is the 19th in the history of Sydney Football Club. In addition to the domestic league, Sydney FC competed in the Australia Cup for the ninth time.

== Players ==
=== First-team squad ===
Note: Flags indicate national team as defined under FIFA eligibility rules; some limited exceptions apply. Players may hold more than one non-FIFA nationality.

No.	Pos.	Nation	Player
1	GK	AUS	Andrew Redmayne
3	DF	AUS	Aaron Gurd
4	DF	AUS	Jordan Courtney-Perkins
6	DF	ENG	Jack Rodwell
8	MF	AUS	Jake Girdwood-Reich
9	FW	BRA	Fábio Gomes (on loan from Atlético Mineiro)
10	FW	ENG	Joe Lolley
11	FW	SVK	Róbert Mak
12	MF	AUS	Corey Hollman (scholarship)
13	FW	AUS	Patrick Wood
15	DF	BRA	Gabriel Lacerda (on loan from Ceará)
16	DF	AUS	Joel King
17	MF	AUS	Anthony Caceres

No.	Pos.	Nation	Player
18	MF	AUS	Matthew Scarcella (scholarship)
19	FW	AUS	Mitch Glasson
20	GK	AUS	Adam Pavlesic
21	DF	AUS	Zac De Jesus
22	MF	AUS	Max Burgess
23	DF	AUS	Rhyan Grant (vice-captain)
24	MF	AUS	Wataru Kamijo
25	FW	AUS	Jaiden Kucharski
26	MF	AUS	Luke Brattan (captain)
27	DF	AUS	Hayden Matthews
28	FW	AUS	Nathan Amanatidis
30	GK	AUS	Gus Hoefsloot (scholarship)

== Transfers ==
=== Transfers in ===
No.	Position	Player	Transferred from	Type/fee	Contract length	Date	Ref.
16	DF	Joel King	(Denmark) OB	Free transfer	3 years	23 June 2023	
28	MF	Nathan Amanatidis	Adelaide United NPL	Free transfer	3 years	18 July 2023	
9	FW	(Brazil) Fábio Gomes	(Brazil) Atlético Mineiro	Loan	1 year	12 September 2023	
4	DF	Jordan Courtney-Perkins	(Poland) Raków Częstochowa	Free transfer	3 years	15 September 2023	
15	DF	(Brazil) Gabriel Lacerda	(Brazil) Ceará	Loan	1 year	19 September 2023	

==== From youth squad ====
N	Pos.	Nat.	Name	Age	Notes
18	MF	(Australia)	Matthew Scarcella	19	2-year scholarship contract
30	GK	(Australia)	Gus Hoefsloot	17	3-year scholarship contract
19	FW	(Australia)	Mitch Glasson	17	3-year contract
21	DF	(Australia)	Zac De Jesus	17	3-year contract
24	MF	(Australia)	Wataru Kamijo	17	3-year contract
27	DF	(Australia)	Hayden Matthews	19	3-year contract

=== Transfers out ===
No.	Position	Player	Transferred to	Type/fee	Date	Ref.
20	GK	Tom Heward-Belle	Unattached	End of contract	24 May 2023	
3	DF	Joel King	(Denmark) OB	End of loan	24 May 2023	
4	DF	Alex Wilkinson	Retired		1 June 2023	
9	FW	(England) Adam Le Fondre	Unattached	End of contract	12 June 2023	
8	MF	Paulo Retre	(India) Goa	Undisclosed	25 June 2023	
2	DF	James Donachie	Western United	Mutual contract termination	2 July 2023	
21	FW	Alex Parsons	Brisbane Roar	Mutual contract termination	2 July 2023	
18	DF	(Spain) Diego Caballo	(Denmark) AaB	Undisclosed	5 July 2023	
7	FW	Adrian Segecic	(Netherlands) Dordrecht	Loan	30 August 2023	
27	DF	Kealey Adamson	Macarthur FC	End of contract	7 December 2023	

=== Contract extensions ===
No.	Position	Name	Duration	Date	Note
13	FW	Patrick Wood	2 years	3 July 2023	
8	MF	Jake Girdwood-Reich	3 years	19 July 2023	New 3-year contract, replacing previous scholarship contract which was until end of 2023–24.
25	FW	Jaiden Kucharski	2 years	29 August 2023	New 2-year contract, replacing previous scholarship contract which was until end of 2023–24.
12	MF	Corey Hollman	2 years	5 October 2023	Contract extended from end of 2023–24 until end of 2025–26.
10	FW	(England) Joe Lolley	2 years	17 January 2024	Contract extended from end of 2023–24 until end of 2025–26.
23	DF	Rhyan Grant	2 years	7 March 2024	Contract extended from end of 2023–24 until end of 2025–26.

== Kits ==
Home	Away	Third	Australia Cup Home	Australia Cup Away

== Pre-season and friendlies ==
25 July 2023	Sydney FC (Australia)	5–3	(Australia) Manly United	Sydney
	Wood 10' (pen.); Gurd 25'; Caceres 36'; Glasson 52', 55'	Report	Aganovic 18'; McCarthy 28'; Lal 53'	Stadium: Sky Park
Note: The match was shortened to 60 minutes

1 August 2023	Sydney FC (Australia)	2–1	(Australia) NWS Spirit	Sydney
	Wood 20'; Amanatidis 88'	Report	Kekeris 8'	Stadium: Sky Park

6 August 2023	Sydney FC (Australia)	0–0	(Australia) Newcastle Jets	Sydney
		Report		Stadium: Sky Park

23 August 2023	Sydney FC (Australia)	3–1	(Australia) Macarthur FC	Sydney
	Lolley 24'; Mak 40'; Glasson 80'	Report	Hollman 88'	Stadium: Sky Park

6 September 2023	Newcastle Jets (Australia)	0–1	(Australia) Sydney FC	Maitland
		Report	Kucharski 22'	Stadium: Maitland Sportsground; Attendance: 0 behind closed doors

== Competitions ==
=== Overall record ===
Competition	First match	Last match	Starting round	Final position	Record							
Competition	First match	Last match	Starting round	Final position	Pld	W	D	L	GF	GA	GD	Win %
A-League Men	21 October 2023	28 April 2024	Matchday 1	4th	27	12	5	10	52	41	+11	44.44
A-League Men Finals	4 May 2024	18 May 2024	Elimination-finals	Semi-finals	3	1	1	1	5	2	+3	33.33
Australia Cup	13 August 2023	7 October 2023	Round of 32	Winners	5	4	1	0	13	5	+8	80.00
Total					35	17	7	11	70	48	+22	48.57

Last updated: 19 May 2024
Source: Soccerway

=== A-League Men ===
==== League table ====
Pos	Team	Pld	W	D	L	GF	GA	GD	Pts	Qualification
2	Wellington Phoenix (Note: Wellington Phoenix cannot qualify for Asian Football Confederation competitions as they are based in New Zealand, which is part of the Oceania Football Confederation.)	27	15	8	4	42	26	+16	53	Qualification for Finals series (Note: The top two teams enter the finals series at the semi-finals, while the teams ranked third to sixth enter the finals series at the elimination-finals.)
3	Melbourne Victory	27	10	12	5	43	33	+10	42	Qualification for Finals series
4	Sydney FC	27	12	5	10	52	41	+11	41	Qualification for AFC Champions League Two and Finals series (Note: Qualified for AFC Champions League Two as the 2023 Australia Cup winners.)
5	Macarthur FC	27	11	8	8	45	48	−3	41	Qualification for Finals series
6	Melbourne City	27	11	6	10	50	38	+12	39	Qualification for Finals series

Source: A-Leagues
Rules for classification: 1) points; 2) wins; 3) goal difference; 4) goals scored; 5) head-to-head results; 5a) head-to-head points; 5b) head-to-head goal difference; 6) Fair Play points; 7) away goal difference; 8) away goals per match; 9) home goal difference; 10) home goals per match; 11) toss of a coin in an event of a tie of two clubs.

==== Results summary ====
Away figures include Sydney FC's 4–3 loss on neutral ground against Adelaide United on 13 January 2024.

Overall								Home						Away					
Pld	W	D	L	GF	GA	GD	Pts	W	D	L	GF	GA	GD	W	D	L	GF	GA	GD
27	12	5	10	52	41	+11	41	8	2	3	29	15	+14	4	3	7	23	26	−3

Last updated: 28 April 2024.
Source: Ultimate A-League

==== Results by round ====
Round	1	2	3	4	5	6	7	8	9	10	11	27	13	14	15	16	17	18	19	20	21	22	12	23	24	25	26
Ground	H	A	A	A	H	H	H	A	H	H	A	N	H	A	A	A	H	H	A	H	A	H	A	A	H	A	H
Result	L	L	L	W	L	W	L	L	W	W	W	L	W	D	D	W	W	D	W	D	L	W	D	L	W	L	W
Position	11	11	12	10	10	8	10	10	9	9	7	9	6	7	7	6	5	6	5	5	5	5	4	4	4	5	4
Points	0	0	0	3	3	6	6	6	9	12	15	15	18	19	20	23	26	27	30	31	31	34	35	35	38	38	41

Updated to match(es) played on 28 April 2024. Source: Ultimate A-League
A = Away; H = Home; N = Neutral; W = Win; D = Draw; L = Loss

==== Matches ====
Win Draw Loss Fixtures

21 October 2023 1	Sydney FC	0–2	Melbourne Victory	Sydney
19:45 AEDT		Report	Fornaroli 62'; Machach 86'	Stadium: Allianz Stadium; Attendance: 14,586; Referee: Daniel Elder

27 October 2023 2	Brisbane Roar	3–0	Sydney FC	Brisbane
18:45 AEST	Hore 1', 51'; Mileusnic 21'	Report		Stadium: Suncorp Stadium; Attendance: 7,688; Referee: Alireza Faghani

3 November 2023 3	Melbourne City	2–0	Sydney FC	Melbourne
19:45 AEDT	Ugarkovic 45'; Maclaren 46'	Report		Stadium: AAMI Park; Attendance: 5,303; Referee: Daniel Elder

11 November 2023 4	Adelaide United	1–5	Sydney FC	Adelaide
19:15 ACDT	Clough 67' (pen.)	Report	Lolley 4', 13'; Kucharski 31', 44'; Gomes 46'	Stadium: Coopers Stadium; Attendance: 12,859; Referee: Adam Kersey

25 November 2023 5	Sydney FC	0–1	Western Sydney Wanderers	Sydney
19:45 AEDT		Report	Sapsford 72'	Stadium: Allianz Stadium; Attendance: 28,152; Referee: Daniel Elder

2 December 2023 6	Sydney FC	3–2	Perth Glory	Sydney
19:45 AEDT	Lolley 33'; Mak 44'; Šušnjar 89' (o.g.)	Report	Taggart 63'; Bozainc 90+1'	Stadium: Allianz Stadium; Attendance: 8,182; Referee: Alireza Faghani

9 December 2023 7	Sydney FC	0–2	Macarthur FC	Sydney
19:45 AEDT		Report	Hollman 28'; Germain 86'	Stadium: Allianz Stadium; Attendance: 8,006; Referee: Daniel Elder

16 December 2023 8	Melbourne Victory	3–0	Sydney FC	Melbourne
19:45 AEDT	Arzani 20'; Machach 24'; Fornaroli 57'	Report		Stadium: AAMI Park; Attendance: 14,607; Referee: Adam Kersey

23 December 2023 9	Sydney FC	4–2	Western United	Sydney
17:30 AEDT	Gomes 26'; Lolley 40', 90+2'; Rodwell 47'	Report	Thurgate 5'; Grimaldi 83'	Stadium: Allianz Stadium; Attendance: 11,315; Referee: Jonathan Barreiro

29 December 2023 10	Sydney FC	3–1	Wellington Phoenix	Sydney
19:45 AEDT	Grant 11'; Mak 86'; Gomes 90+4'	Report	Barbarouses 81'	Stadium: Allianz Stadium; Attendance: 14,343; Referee: Alireza Faghani

6 January 2024 11	Brisbane Roar	1–2	Sydney FC	Brisbane
18:45 AEST	Mileusnic 45+4'	Report	Gomes 1', 42'	Stadium: Suncorp Stadium; Attendance: 10,115; Referee: Daniel Elder

13 January 2024 27	Adelaide United	4–3	Sydney FC	Sydney
20:00 AEDT	Ibusuki 24', 34', 73'; Irankunda 45+5'	Report	Cáceres 7'; Lolley 76', 90+5'	Stadium: Allianz Stadium; Attendance: 11,918; Referee: Alex King

19 January 2024 13	Sydney FC	4–0	Newcastle Jets	Sydney
19:45 AEDT	Wood 40'; Lolley 66'; Burgess 76', 79'	Report		Stadium: Allianz Stadium; Attendance: 11,160; Referee: Adam Bavcar

26 January 2024 14	Melbourne Victory	1–1	Sydney FC	Melbourne
19:45 AEDT	Machach 17'	Report	Courtney-Perkins 10'	Stadium: AAMI Park; Attendance: 18,102; Referee: Adam Kersey

3 February 2024 15	Western United	2–2	Sydney FC	Hobart
17:30 AEDT	Botic 48'; Garuccio 53'	Report	Gomes 36' (pen.); Girdwood-Reich 43'	Stadium: North Hobart Oval; Attendance: 5,076; Referee: Lachlan Keevers

10 February 2024 16	Central Coast Mariners	1–3	Sydney FC	Gosford
19:45 AEDT	Torres 56'	Report	Grant 4'; Caceres 8'; Hall 20' (o.g.)	Stadium: Industree Group Stadium; Attendance: 11,379; Referee: Jonathan Barreiro

17 February 2024 17	Sydney FC	2–1	Adelaide United	Sydney
18:00 AEDT	Mak 27'; Gomes 84' (pen.)	Report	López 90+4'	Stadium: Allianz Stadium; Attendance: 14,084; Referee: Alex King

24 February 2024 18	Sydney FC	1–1	Melbourne City	Sydney
17:30 AEDT	Courtney-Perkins 29'	Report	Tilio 61'	Stadium: Allianz Stadium; Attendance: 15,120; Referee: Adam Kersey

2 March 2024 19	Western Sydney Wanderers	1–4	Sydney FC	Sydney
19:45 AEDT	Girdwood-Reich 72' (o.g.)	Report	Grant 3'; Gomes 7' (pen.), 59'; Mak 50'	Stadium: CommBank Stadium; Attendance: 27,998; Referee: Alex King

10 March 2024 20	Sydney FC	1–1	Brisbane Roar	Sydney
17:00 AEDT	Mak 64'	Report	Hore 67'	Stadium: Allianz Stadium; Attendance: 11,087; Referee: Adam Kersey

16 March 2024 21	Wellington Phoenix	2–1	Sydney FC	Auckland
17:30 NZDT	Matthews 54' (o.g.); Barbarouses 69'	Report	Mak 6'	Stadium: Eden Park; Attendance: 18,002; Referee: Alireza Faghani

30 March 2024 22	Sydney FC	2–0	Central Coast Mariners	Sydney
19:45	Caceres 74'; King 77'	Report		Stadium: Allianz Stadium; Attendance: 12,768; Referee: Shaun Evans

3 April 2024 12	Perth Glory	1–1	Sydney FC	Perth
21:45 AWST	Majekodunmi 72'	Report	Lolley 25' (pen.)	Stadium: HBF Park; Attendance: 4,862; Referee: Alex King
Note: Originally scheduled for 12 January 2024, was moved due to Unite Round.

7 April 2024 23	Newcastle Jets	3–1	Sydney FC	Newcastle
15:00 AEST	Taylor 19'; Piscopo 28'; Stamatelopoulos 62'	Report	Gomes 45'	Stadium: McDonald Jones Stadium; Attendance: 5,765; Referee: Jack Morgan

13 April 2024 24	Sydney FC	2–1	Western Sydney Wanderers	Sydney
19:45 AEST	Gomes 72'; Kucharski 90+8'	Report	Sapsford 90+5'	Stadium: Allianz Stadium; Attendance: 26,155; Referee: Alireza Faghani

21 April 2024 25	Macarthur FC	1–0	Sydney FC	Sydney
19:45 AEST	Drew 45+4'	Report		Stadium: Campbelltown Sports Stadium; Attendance: 7,723; Referee: Daniel Elder

28 April 2024 26	Sydney FC	7–1	Perth Glory	Sydney
15:00 AEST	Courtney-Perkins 5'; Lolley 41', 90+1'; Brattan 45+2' (pen.); Mak 68', 74'; King 81'	Report	Taggart 58'	Stadium: Allianz Stadium; Attendance: 13,225; Referee: Jonathon Barreiro

==== Finals series ====
4 May 2024 Elimination-finals	Sydney FC	4–0	Macarthur FC	Sydney
19:45 AEST	Mak 8', 78'; Lolley 50'; Kucharski 67'	Report		Stadium: Allianz Stadium; Attendance: 11,792; Referee: Alireza Faghani

10 May 2024 Semi-finals First Leg	Sydney FC	1–2	Central Coast Mariners	Sydney
19:45 AEST	King 25'	Report	Nisbet 45+3'; Doka 56' (pen.)	Stadium: Allianz Stadium; Attendance: 13,813; Referee: Ben Abraham

18 May 2024 Semi-finals Second Leg	Central Coast Mariners	0–0 (2–1 agg.)	Sydney FC	Gosford
19:45 AEST		Report		Stadium: Industree Group Stadium; Attendance: 20,059; Referee: Alireza Faghani

=== Australia Cup ===
Win Draw Loss

13 August 2023 Round of 32	Sydney FC	3–3 (a.e.t.) (10–9 p)	Central Coast Mariners	Wollongong
15:00 AEST	Mak 42'; Wood 59'; Kucharski 120+3'	Report	Kuol 61'; Túlio 84'; Steele 100'	Stadium: WIN Stadium; Attendance: 2,540; Referee: Alireza Faghani
	Penalties
	Caceres (penalty scored); Brattan (penalty scored); Kucharski (penalty scored); Girdwood-Reich (penalty scored); Segecic (penalty missed); Glasson (penalty scored); Adamson (penalty scored); King (penalty scored); Gurd (penalty scored); Scarcella (penalty scored); Redmayne (penalty scored)		(penalty scored) Theoharous; (penalty scored) Wenzel-Halls; (penalty scored) Hammond; (penalty missed) Steele; (penalty scored) Smith; (penalty scored) Nisbet; (penalty scored) Paull; (penalty scored) Hall; (penalty scored) Kaltak; (penalty scored) Farrell; (penalty missed) Warshawsky

30 August 2023 Round of 16	APIA Leichhardt (New South Wales)	0–2	Sydney FC	Sydney
19:30 AEST		Report	Caceres 54'; Wood 66'	Stadium: Leichhardt Oval; Attendance: 4,601; Referee: Shaun Evans

17 September 2023 Quarter-finals	Sydney FC	3–0	Western United	Sydney
15:00 AEST	Caceres 11'; Wood 29'; Rodwell 67'	Report		Stadium: Leichhardt Oval; Attendance: 2,916; Referee: Casey Reibelt

24 September 2023 Semi-finals	Melbourne City	1–2	Sydney FC	Melbourne
15:00 AEST	Maclaren 89'	Report	Wood 38'; Lolley 73'	Stadium: AAMI Park; Attendance: 2,267; Referee: Jack Morgan

7 October 2023 Final	Sydney FC	3–1	Brisbane Roar	Sydney
19:45 AEDT	Fábio 67' (pen.), 90+1'; Mak 72'	Report	Waddingham 18'	Stadium: Allianz Stadium; Attendance: 15,482; Referee: Ben Abraham

== Statistics ==
=== Appearances and goals ===
Includes all competitions. Players with no appearances not included in the list.

As of 18 May 2024

No.	Pos.	Nat.	Player	A-League Men		A-League Men Finals Series		Australia Cup		Total	
No.	Pos.	Nat.	Player	Apps	Goals	Apps	Goals	Apps	Goals	Apps	Goals
1	GK	(Australia)	Andrew Redmayne	26	0	3	0	5	0	34	0
3	DF	(Australia)	Aaron Gurd	1+1	0	0+1	0	1+2	0	6	0
4	DF	(Australia)	Jordan Courtney-Perkins	14+8	3	3	0	1+1	0	27	3
6	DF	(England)	Jack Rodwell	5+2	1	2	0	3	1	12	2
8	MF	(Australia)	Jake Girdwood-Reich	23	1	1+1	0	5	0	30	1
9	FW	(Brazil)	Fábio Gomes	19+6	11	1+2	0	0+2	2	30	13
10	FW	(England)	Joe Lolley	27	11	1	1	5	2	33	14
11	FW	(Slovakia)	Robert Mak	20+4	8	3	2	5	1	32	11
12	MF	(Australia)	Corey Hollman	18+4	0	2	0	5	0	29	0
13	FW	(Australia)	Patrick Wood	6+9	1	0+2	0	5	4	22	5
15	DF	(Brazil)	Gabriel Lacerda	19+3	0	1+1	0	1+1	0	26	0
16	DF	(Australia)	Joel King	11+6	2	3	1	4	0	24	3
17	MF	(Australia)	Anthony Caceres	24+1	3	3	0	5	2	33	5
18	MF	(Australia)	Matthew Scarcella	0+6	0	0	0	0+2	0	8	0
19	FW	(Australia)	Mitch Glasson	0+15	0	0	0	0+3	0	18	0
20	GK	(Australia)	Adam Pavlesic	1+1	0	0	0	0	0	2	0
21	DF	(Australia)	Zac De Jesus	3+5	0	0	0	0	0	8	0
22	MF	(Australia)	Max Burgess	9+10	2	1+2	0	0+3	0	25	2
23	DF	(Australia)	Rhyan Grant	25+1	3	3	0	1+2	0	32	3
25	FW	(Australia)	Jaiden Kucharski	9+13	3	0+2	1	0+4	1	28	5
26	MF	(Australia)	Luke Brattan	25+1	1	3	0	4	0	33	1
27	DF	(Australia)	Hayden Matthews	11+3	0	3	0	0	0	17	0
28	FW	(Australia)	Nathan Amanatidis	0+12	0	0	0	0+1	0	13	0
Player(s) transferred out but featured this season
7	FW	(Australia)	Adrian Segecic	0	0	0	0	0+1	0	1	0
27	DF	(Australia)	Kealey Adamson	0	0	0	0	4+1	0	5	0

=== Disciplinary record ===
Includes all competitions. The list is sorted by squad number when total cards are equal. Players with no cards not included in the list.

As of 18 May 2024

Rank	No.	Pos.	Nat.	Name	A-League Men			A-League Men Finals Series			Australia Cup			Total		
Rank	No.	Pos.	Nat.	Name	Yellow card	(yellow card) (yellow-red card)	Red card	Yellow card	(yellow card) (yellow-red card)	Red card	Yellow card	(yellow card) (yellow-red card)	Red card	Yellow card	(yellow card) (yellow-red card)	Red card
1	8	MF	(Australia)	Jake Girdwood-Reich	4	0	2	0	0	0	1	0	0	5	0	2
2	13	FW	(Australia)	Patrick Wood	3	0	1	0	0	0	1	0	0	4	0	1
3	1	GK	(Australia)	Andrew Redmayne	2	0	1	0	0	0	0	0	0	2	0	1
3	11	FW	(Slovakia)	Róbert Mak	1	0	1	0	0	0	1	0	0	2	0	1
5	6	DF	(England)	Jack Rodwell	1	0	0	0	0	1	0	0	0	1	0	1
6	17	MF	(Australia)	Anthony Caceres	2	0	0	0	1	0	1	0	0	3	1	0
7	12	MF	(Australia)	Corey Hollman	2	0	0	0	1	0	0	0	0	2	1	0
8	26	MF	(Australia)	Luke Brattan	7	0	0	0	0	0	1	0	0	8	0	0
9	16	DF	(Australia)	Joel King	4	0	0	0	0	0	0	0	0	4	0	0
9	22	MF	(Australia)	Max Burgess	4	0	0	0	0	0	0	0	0	4	0	0
11	15	DF	(Brazil)	Gabriel Lacerda	3	0	0	0	0	0	0	0	0	3	0	0
11	23	DF	(Australia)	Rhyan Grant	3	0	0	0	0	0	0	0	0	3	0	0
13	4	DF	(Australia)	Jordan Courtney-Perkins	2	0	0	0	0	0	0	0	0	2	0	0
13	9	FW	(Brazil)	Fábio Gomes	2	0	0	0	0	0	0	0	0	2	0	0
13	10	FW	(England)	Joe Lolley	1	0	0	1	0	0	0	0	0	2	0	0
13	25	FW	(Australia)	Jaiden Kucharski	2	0	0	0	0	0	0	0	0	2	0	0
13	27	DF	(Australia)	Hayden Matthews	2	0	0	0	0	0	0	0	0	2	0	0
18	28	FW	(Australia)	Nathan Amanatidis	1	0	0	0	0	0	0	0	0	1	0	0
Total					46	0	5	1	2	1	5	0	0	52	2	5

=== Clean sheets ===
Includes all competitions. The list is sorted by squad number when total clean sheets are equal. Numbers in parentheses represent games where both goalkeepers participated and both kept a clean sheet; the number in parentheses is awarded to the goalkeeper who was substituted on, whilst a full clean sheet is awarded to the goalkeeper who was on the field at the start and end of play. Goalkeepers with no clean sheets not included in the list.

As of 18 May 2024

Rank	No.	Nat.	Goalkeeper	A-League Men	A-League Men Finals Series	Australia Cup	Total
1	1	(Australia)	Andrew Redmayne	2	2	2	6
Total				2	2	2	6

== End of Season awards ==
On 29 May 2024, Sydney FC hosted their annual Sky Blue Ball and presented nine awards on the night.

Award	Men's	Women's
Player of the Year	(England) Joe Lolley	Charlotte McLean
Member's Player of the Year	(England) Joe Lolley	Mackenzie Hawkesby
U20 Player of the Year	Corey Hollman	Shae Hollman
Golden Boot	(Brazil) Fábio Gomes & (England) Joe Lolley	Cortnee Vine
Rising Star Award	Marin France	
Powerchair Players’ Player of the Year	Harry Simmons	
Chairman's Award	Howard Fondyke (Head Of Fan Engagement and NPL Assistant Coach)	

== See also ==
- 2023–24 Sydney FC (A-League Women) season
