= Harold Steele =

Harold Steele may refer to:

- Harold Steele (archdeacon), New Zealand archdeacon
- Harry Steele (businessman) (1929–2022), Canadian businessman

== See also ==
- Harold Steel (1862–1911), English cricketer
- Harry Steele (disambiguation)
