= Joe Lolley =

English footballer (born 1992)

Personal information
- Full name: Joseph Lolley
- Date of birth: 25 August 1992 (age 34)
- Place of birth: Redditch, England
- Height: 5 ft 10 in (1.78 m)
- Position: Winger

Team information
- Current team: Newcastle Jets
- Number: 11

Youth career
- 2005–2008: Birmingham City
- 2008–2011: Bromsgrove Rovers

Senior career*
Years	Team	Apps	(Gls)
2011–2013	Littleton		
2013–2014	Kidderminster Harriers	21	(9)
2014–2018	Huddersfield Town	80	(9)
2015	→ Scunthorpe United (loan)	6	(0)
2018–2022	Nottingham Forest	159	(24)
2022–2026	Sydney FC	93	(36)
2026–	Newcastle Jets	3	(0)

International career
2013	United Kingdom (universiades)		
2013	England C	1	(0)
- * Club domestic league appearances and goals as of 26 April 2026

Joseph Lolley (born 25 August 1992) is an English footballer who plays as a winger for A-League Men club Newcastle Jets. His previous clubs in English football include Huddersfield Town, for whom he appeared in the Premier League, and Nottingham Forest. He has represented his country at England C level and University level.

== Club career ==
=== Early life and early career ===
Joseph Lolley was born on 25 August 1992 in Redditch, Worcestershire. He was part of Birmingham City's academy until the age of 16. He then moved to Bromsgrove Rovers, but made his name with Midland Combination side Littleton, scoring 88 goals in 83 games.

=== Kidderminster Harriers ===
In July 2013, following a successful trial, Lolley signed a one-year contract with Conference Premier side Kidderminster Harriers. After a strong start to the season, Lolley scored his first Harriers goal in his second appearance, a 3–1 win over Chester. Lolley went on to score 9 league goals in 21 league appearances, and also 2 goals in 6 appearances in the FA Cup. Kidderminster won every game that Lolley scored in. In his last league game for the Harriers, he scored a hat-trick against Salisbury City, in his last game for the Harriers, he scored the winning goal in a 3–2 FA Cup 3rd Round replay away to Peterborough United. Kidderminster received an offer from Peterborough United, but Lolley rejected the move.

=== Huddersfield Town ===
On 15 January 2014, just one day after scoring the goal that knocked Peterborough out of the FA Cup, Lolley joined Championship side Huddersfield Town for an undisclosed fee. He made his début as a substitute in the 5–1 defeat by Leeds United at Elland Road on 1 February 2014. On 3 May 2014, Lolley made his first start for the Terriers where he scored the first goal in the 4–1 victory over Watford in the 46th minute and also claimed two assists which was the last game of the season. On 14 March 2015, Lolley scored his second league goal for Huddersfield in a 1–1 away draw at Birmingham City. His first home goal for the Terriers was the equalising goal in the 2–2 draw against Blackburn Rovers on 25 April 2015.

On 25 September, Lolley joined Scunthorpe United on an initial one-month loan. After making 6 appearances on loan for the Iron, he along with his teammate Murray Wallace were recalled on 1 November.

=== Nottingham Forest ===
On 31 January 2018, Lolley signed a four-and-a-half-year contract with Nottingham Forest for an undisclosed fee. He was one of six additions to the Forest squad on deadline day. He scored his first goal for Forest in a 5–2 win at QPR on 24 February 2018.

On 3 May 2019 he was crowned Nottingham Forest's Player of the Season for the 2018–19 season. He also won Forest's Goal of the Season award for a long range strike against his boyhood club Aston Villa in a thrilling match that would finish 5-5. He also provided four assists in this game.

In August 2022, Lolley was training with the club's U23 side, having reportedly fallen out with head coach Steve Cooper, and was looking for a move away from the club.

=== Sydney FC ===
On 15 August 2022, it was announced that Lolley had signed a two-year deal with A–League Men side Sydney FC, taking on the number 10 jersey. Lolley made his debut for the club on 31 August 2022, in a shock 2–1 loss against semi-professional side Oakleigh Cannons at Jack Edwards Reserve, Melbourne. He would later score his first goal for the club against defending champions Western United in a 3–1 away win at AAMI Park. Lolley finished his first season in Australia with six goals and five assists as Sydney reached the A-League Men finals series.

The 2023–24 preseason would see Lolley win the 2023 Australia Cup with Sydney, his first silverware with the club. In the final against Brisbane Roar he would provide a crucial assist to teammate Róbert Mak, giving Sydney the lead in a 3–1 win. He would also be awarded the Mark Viduka Medal, for his performance in the final. His first goals of the 2023–24 A-League Men season were scored on 11 November 2023, with a brace in a 5–1 win against Adelaide United at Coopers Stadium. He would be rewarded for his excellent form with the club, signing a two-year contract extension with Sydney FC on 18 January 2024. Lolley would finish the 2023–24 A-League Men regular season with eleven goals and seven assists in 27 appearances, joint top scorer for the club alongside teammate Fábio Gomes. Lolley would injure his hamstring while scoring in a 4–0 against Macarthur FC in the 2024 A-League Men finals series, putting him out for the remainder of the season. During Sydney FC's end of season awards, Lolley would be awarded the Player of the Year and Members Player of the Year. He would also be named in the PFA A-League Men team of the season.

Lolley scored in his first match of the 2024–25 season with a 17th minute goal in a 2–1 win against the Western Sydney Wanderers at CommBank Stadium, his first goal scored in a Sydney Derby. Due to injuries to teammates Patryk Klimala and Patrick Wood, Lolley would start as a striker in a 3–0 over arch-rivals Melbourne Victory on 28 December 2024, he would go on to score a brace, and was denied a first-half hat-trick due to a tight offside during the build up of the disallowed goal. His first hat-trick for Sydney FC would come eleven days later in a 3–0 win against Perth Glory, with all three goals being scored in 36 minutes. Lolley would also feature in his first continental campaign, as Sydney participated in the 2024–25 AFC Champions League Two. His first appearance in continental football would come against Hong Kong's Eastern, and his first goal of the Asian campaign would be scored against Kaya–Iloilo at the Rizal Memorial Sports Complex, Manila. He would score a further two goals in the knockout stages, including a 85th minute winner at home in a 1–0 win against Lion City Sailors in the semi-finals. Lolley's goal was not enough to prevent Sydney being eliminated, as the club would lose the tie 2–1 on aggregate. The remainder of the 2024–25 A-League Men regular season would see him being deployed as a left wing-back on occasion due to manager Ufuk Talay's attempts at fitting Lolley, Douglas Costa and Adrian Segečić into the same starting lineup. Sydney would finish the season seventh in the league, failing to make the finals series by a single point, after losing their final two matches in the league.

Lolley would request to leave Sydney for Perth Glory in the off-season due to frustrations of being played out of position. Sydney would deny the request, with then-CEO Mark Aubery stating that Lolley was a required player. The club would later provide him assurances that he would play in his preferred position for the 2025–26 season. His first goal of the season was an 87th minute equaliser scored against Auckland FC in the quarter-finals Australia Cup. The match would go to a penalty shoot-out after finishing 1–1 after extra-time, Lolley would miss the final penalty of the shoot-out, slipping while sending his shot over the bar. He would score in the opening match of the 2025–26 A-League Men season in a 2–1 defeat away to Adelaide United on 17 October 2025.

Lolley made his 100th appearance in all competitions for Sydney FC in a 2–0 home win over the Central Coast Mariners, at Leichhardt Oval.

== International career ==
As an England and Great Britain International, Lolley has represented his country at both University Level and semi-professional level. In the summer of 2013 he was selected by the Great Britain University team to play at the 2013 World University Games in Russia where GB went on to reach the final winning the silver medal. He then made his debut for the England C team in a 2–2 friendly match with the Czech Republic U21s in November 2013 during his time at Kidderminster.

== Personal life ==
Lolley studied Sports Coaching at the University of Central Lancashire.

Lolley is also a dog lover. He visited the Soi Dog Foundation in Thailand in June 2019, and also has his own black Labrador named Bear.

== Career statistics ==
As of 4 November 2026

Appearances and goals by club, season and competition
Club	Season	League			National cup (Note: Includes FA Cup, Australia Cup)		Continental		Other		Total	
Club	Season	Division	Apps	Goals	Apps	Goals	Apps	Goals	Apps	Goals	Apps	Goals
Kidderminster Harriers	2013–14	Conference Premier	21	9	6	2	—		1 (Note: Appearance in FA Trophy)	0	28	11
Huddersfield Town	2013–14	Championship	6	1	0	0	—		—		6	1
Huddersfield Town	2014–15	Championship	17	2	1	0	—		1 (Note: Includes Football League Cup/EFL Cup)	1	19	3
Huddersfield Town	2015–16	Championship	32	4	2	0	—		—		34	4
Huddersfield Town	2016–17	Championship	19	1	3	0	—		0	0	22	1
Huddersfield Town	2017–18	Premier League	6	1	2	0	—		2	1	10	2
Huddersfield Town	Total		80	9	8	0	0	0	4	2	91	11
Scunthorpe United (loan)	2015–16	League One	6	0	0	0	—		—		6	0
Nottingham Forest	2017–18	Championship	16	3	0	0	—		—		16	3
Nottingham Forest	2018–19	Championship	46	11	1	0	—		4	1	51	12
Nottingham Forest	2019–20	Championship	42	9	0	0	—		2	1	44	10
Nottingham Forest	2020–21	Championship	28	1	2	0	—		—		30	1
Nottingham Forest	2021–22	Championship	27	0	1	0	—		2 (Note: Appearances in EFL Championship play-offs)	0	30	0
Nottingham Forest	Total		159	24	4	0	0	0	8	2	171	26
Sydney FC	2022–23	A-League Men	27	6	1	0	—		—		28	6
Sydney FC	2023–24	A-League Men	28	12	5	1	—		—		33	13
Sydney FC	2024–25	A-League Men	24	9	0	0	10 (Note: Appearances in AFC Champions League Two)	3	—		34	12
Sydney FC	2025–26	A-League Men	14	4	3	1	—		—		17	5
Sydney FC	Total		93	31	9	2	10	3	0	0	112	36
Newcastle Jets	2026–27	A-League Men	3	0	0	0	4 (Note: Appearances in AFC Champions League Elite)	0	—		7	0
Career total			362	73	27	4	14	3	12	4	415	84

== Honours ==
Nottingham Forest

- EFL Championship play-offs: 2022

Sydney FC

- Australia Cup: 2023

Individual

- Nottingham Forest Player of the Season 2018–19
- Nottingham Forest Goal of the Season 2018–19
- Mark Viduka Medal: 2023
- Sydney FC Player of the Season: 2024
- PFA A-League Team of the Season: 2023–24
