= Hayden Matthews =

Australian soccer player (born 2004)

Personal information
- Full name: Hayden John Matthews
- Date of birth: 19 June 2004 (age 22)
- Place of birth: Sydney, New South Wales, Australia
- Height: 1.95 m (6 ft 5 in)
- Position: Central defender

Team information
- Current team: Bradford City (on loan from Portsmouth)
- Number: 14

Youth career
- 2017–2024: Sydney FC

Senior career*
Years	Team	Apps	(Gls)
2022–2023	Sydney FC NPL	33	(2)
2023–2025	Sydney FC	29	(0)
2025–	Portsmouth	19	(0)
2026–	→ Bradford City (loan)	3	(0)

International career^{‡}
2024–	Australia	1	(0)
- * Club domestic league appearances and goals as of 21:29, 8 September 2026 (UTC) ‡ National team caps and goals as of 20 November 2024

Hayden John Matthews (born 19 June 2004) is an Australian professional soccer player who currently plays as a central defender for EFL League One club Bradford City, on loan from EFL Championship club Portsmouth. Matthews also plays for the Australia national team.

== Club career ==
Matthews was brought into the Sydney A-League Mens side, having been promoted from the National Premier Leagues NSW squad as injury cover for Jack Rodwell and Gabriel Lacerda. He made his debut against Newcastle Jets on 19 January 2024. With limited expectation upon him and fellow youth center half pairing Jake Girdwood-Reich impressed in their performances for the club.

On 27 January 2025, Matthews signed for EFL Championship club Portsmouth for an undisclosed fee, reported to be £1.26 million.

Matthews joined EFL League One club Bradford City on loan for the 2026–27 season on 1 September 2026.

== International career ==
Matthews made his debut for the Socceroos against Bahrain in a World Cup qualifier in November 2024.

== Personal life ==
Matthews has been a life-long Sydney FC supporter.

== Career statistics ==
As of match played 22 February 2025

Appearances and goals by club, season and competition
Club	Season	League			National Cup		League Cup		Continental		Total	
Club	Season	Division	Apps	Goals	Apps	Goals	Apps	Goals	Apps	Goals	Apps	Goals
Sydney FC	2023–24	A-League Men	17	0	0	0	–		0	0	17	0
Sydney FC	2024–25	A-League Men	12	0	1	0	–		6	0	19	0
Sydney FC	Total		29	0	1	0	–		6	0	36	0
Portsmouth	2024–25	Championship	6	0	0	0	0	0	–		6	0
Career total			35	0	1	0	0	0	6	0	42	0
