= Harry Steele =

Harry Steele may refer to:

- Harry Steele (businessman) (1929–2022), Canadian businessman
- Harry L. Steele (1874–1938), U.S. Army officer
- Harry Steele (rugby union) (born 1948), Irish rugby union player
- Harry Steele (soccer) (2002), Australian professional footballer

== See also ==
- Harry Steel (disambiguation)
- Harry Steele-Bodger (1896–1952), British veterinary surgeon
- Harrison Steele (born 2002), Australian professional footballer
