= Zac De Jesus =

Australian soccer player (born 2006)

Personal information
- Full name: Zachary De Jesus
- Date of birth: 4 February 2006 (age 20)
- Place of birth: Wollongong, New South Wales, Australia
- Position: Right back

Team information
- Current team: Wollongong Wolves

Youth career
- 2020: Wollongong Wolves
- 2021–2022: Sydney United 58
- 2023–: Sydney FC

Senior career*
Years	Team	Apps	(Gls)
2023–	Sydney FC NPL	30	(0)
2023–	Sydney FC	21	(0)
2026	→ Wollongong Wolves (loan)	0	(0)

International career^{‡}
2022–2023	Australia U17	10	(0)
- * Club domestic league appearances and goals as of 12 June 2026 ‡ National team caps and goals as of 2 July 2023

Zachary De Jesus (/də ˈdʒiːzəs/ də JEE-zəs, Spanish: [de xeˈsus]; born 4 February 2006) is an Australian professional soccer player who plays as a right back for Australian Championship club Wollongong Wolves, on loan from Sydney FC.

== Early life ==
De Jesus was raised in Dapto, New South Wales and began playing junior football at the age of four alongside his twin brother Beau, with Lakeside Lions and Dapto-based clubs. He grew up supporting Sydney FC.

== Club career ==
=== Sydney FC ===
De Jesus started his career playing for local National Premier Leagues NSW club Wollongong Wolves FC before joining Sydney United 58 FC in 2021. He signed for Sydney FC Youth academy at the start of the 2023 season.

De Jesus signed a three-year contract with Sydney FC on 12 July 2023, promoting him to the A-League Men squad.

== International career ==
Only 29 July 2022, De Jesus was named in the Australia under-16 squad for the 2022 AFF U-16 Youth Championship. He made his debut for the side in a 3–2 loss to Myanmar. On 25 January 2023, De Jesus was named in the Australia under-17 team to attend the 2023 U-17 Antalya Youth Cup. On 15 May 2023 De Jesus was named in the Australia U-17's squad for the 2023 AFC U-17 Asian Cup in Thailand. De Jesus was also selected in the Young Socceroos Squad to contest the 2024 ASEAN U-19 Boys Championship in Indonesia.

== Career statistics ==
=== Club ===
As of 26 April 2026

Club	Season	League			Cup		Continental		Total	
Club	Season	Division	Apps	Goals	Apps	Goals	Apps	Goals	Apps	Goals
Sydney FC	2023–24	A-League Men	8	0	0	0	—		8	0
Sydney FC	2024–25	A-League Men	12	0	0	0	3	0	15	0
Sydney FC	2025–26	A-League Men	1	0	0	0	—		1	0
Career total			21	0	0	0	3	0	24	0
