= Corey Hollman =

Australian soccer player

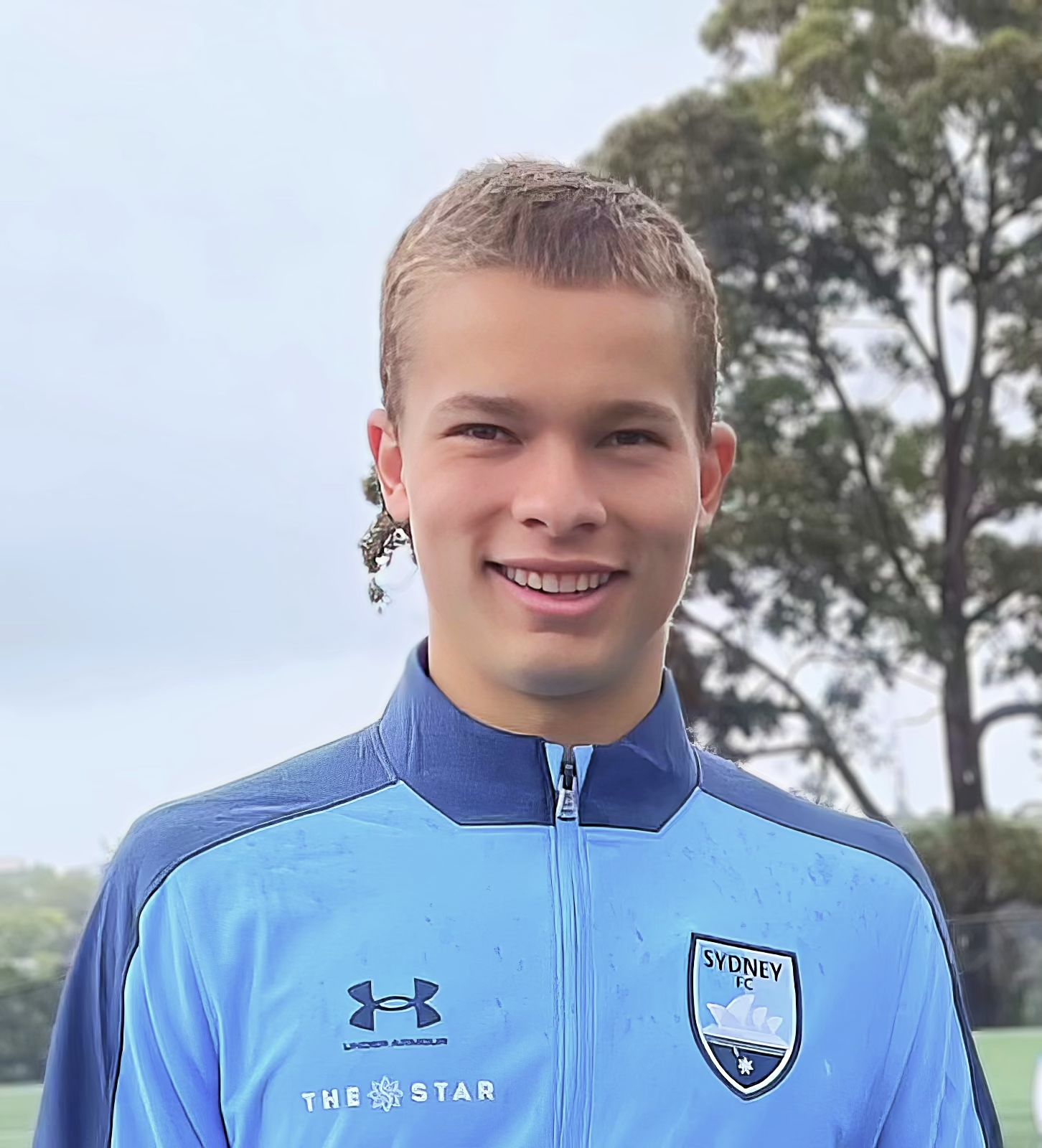
- Corey Hollman representing Sydney FC

Personal information
- Full name: Corey John Hollman
- Date of birth: 25 September 2003 (age 23)
- Place of birth: Sydney, New South Wales, Australia
- Position: Defensive midfielder

Youth career
- Seaforth FC
- Manly United
- 2016–: Sydney FC

Senior career*
Years	Team	Apps	(Gls)
2021	Sydney FC NPL	19	(2)
2021–2026	Sydney FC	53	(0)

International career^{‡}
2024–	Australia U23	2	(0)
Medal record
Men's football
Representing Australia
WAFF U-23 Championship
Runner-up	2024 Saudi Arabia
- * Club domestic league appearances and goals as of 26 April 2026 ‡ National team caps and goals as of 23 March 2025

Corey Hollman (born 25 September 2003) is an Australian professional soccer player who last played as a defensive midfielder for Sydney FC.

== Career ==
Hollman came through the ranks of the Sydney FC academy, before making his debut against Macarthur in a 3-0 win in December 2021.

== Personal life ==
Both of Hollman's siblings also play professional soccer, with his older brother Jake playing for EFL League Two club Walsall, and his younger sister Shay playing for Sydney FC in the A-League Women.

== Career statistics ==
As of match played 26 April 2026

Club	Season	League			National Cup		Continental		Total	
Club	Season	Division	Apps	Goals	Apps	Goals	Apps	Goals	Apps	Goals
Sydney FC	2020–21	A-League Men	1	0	0	0	—		1	0
Sydney FC	2021–22	A-League Men	0	0	0	0	0	0	0	0
Sydney FC	2022–23	A-League Men	0	0	0	0	—		0	0
Sydney FC	2023–24	A-League Men	24	0	5	0	—		29	0
Sydney FC	2024–25	A-League Men	18	0	1	0	9	0	28	0
Sydney FC	2025–26	A-League Men	10	0	3	0	—		13	0
Sydney FC	Total		53	0	9	0	9	0	71	0
Career total			53	0	9	0	9	0	71	0

== Honours ==
=== Sydney FC ===
- Australia Cup: 2023

Australia U-23

- WAFF U-23 Championship: runner-up 2024
