= Harry Steel =

Harry Steel may refer to:

- Harry Steel (politician) (1879–1962), Canadian politician
- Harry Steel (wrestler) (1899–1971), American wrestler

== See also ==
- Harry Steele (disambiguation)
