= Aaron Gurd =

Australian soccer player

Personal information
- Full name: Aaron Bradley Gurd
- Date of birth: 18 September 2001 (age 25)
- Place of birth: Sydney, New South Wales, Australia
- Height: 1.88 m (6 ft 2 in)
- Position: Centre-back

Team information
- Current team: Sydney Olympic
- Number: 3

Youth career
- 2015–2019: Sydney FC Youth

Senior career*
Years	Team	Apps	(Gls)
2019–	Sydney FC NPL	52	(1)
2022–	Sydney FC	21	(0)
2025–2026	→ Kanchanaburi Power (loan)	14	(0)
2026	→ Sydney Olympic (loan)	6	(0)
- * Club domestic league appearances and goals as of 22 November 2026 ‡ National team caps and goals as of 19 August 2022

Aaron Gurd (/ɡɜɹd/; born 18 September 2001) is an Australian professional soccer player who plays as a centre-back for Australian Championship club Sydney Olympic, on loan from Sydney FC.

== Early life ==
Gurd was born on 18 September 2001. He is of Thai descent and has a Thai passport.

== Career ==
Gurd was promoted through the Sydney FC academy ranks as a youngster, making his NPL debut in 2019. In 2022 he was signed along with Jaiden Kucharski to the A-League Men's team on a scholarship deal. Gurd made his debut for the club against the Central Coast Mariners in the 2022 Australia Cup round of 32, in which Sydney would go on to win on penalties. The next game against NPL Victoria club Bentleigh Greens he started the game alongside veteran defender Alex Wilkinson and scored the second goal in their 2–1 victory.

In September 2025, Gurd signed another year extension on his contract until the end of the 2026–27 A-League Men season, and was loaned out to Thai club Kanchanaburi Power for the 2025–26 Thai League 1 season with an option to make the move permanent.

== Career statistics ==
As of 26 January 2026

Appearances and goals by club, season and competition
Club	Season	League			Cup		Continental		Total	
Club	Season	Division	Apps	Goals	Apps	Goals	Apps	Goals	Apps	Goals
Sydney FC	2022–23	A-League Men	12	0	2	1	—		14	1
Sydney FC	2023–24	A-League Men	3	0	3	0	—		6	0
Sydney FC	2024–25	A-League Men	6	0	0	0	2	0	8	0
Total			21	0	5	1	2	0	28	1
Kanchanaburi Power (loan)	2025–26	Thai League 1	3	0	0	0	—		3	0
Career total			24	0	5	1	2	0	31	1

== Honours ==
=== Club ===
==== Sydney FC ====
- Australia Cup: 2023
