= Harold Steele (archdeacon) =

Anglican archdeacon

Harold Joseph Steele was Archdeacon of Waitemata from 1965 until 1972.

Steele was educated at St John's College, Auckland and ordained in 1936. After a curacy at Remuera, he held incumbencies in Auckland, Waimate, Papatoetoe and Mount Eden.
