= Joel King =

Australian professional soccer player

Personal information
- Full name: Joel Bruce King
- Date of birth: 30 October 2000 (age 26)
- Place of birth: Figtree, New South Wales, Australia
- Height: 1.79 m (5 ft 10 in)
- Position: Left-back

Team information
- Current team: Brisbane Roar
- Number: 16

Youth career
- FNSW NTC
- Sydney FC

Senior career*
Years	Team	Apps	(Gls)
2016–2017	FFA CoE	29	(0)
2018–2019	Sydney FC NPL	27	(1)
2019–2022	Sydney FC	63	(0)
2022–2023	OB	17	(0)
2023	→ Sydney FC (loan)	13	(0)
2023–2026	Sydney FC	52	(4)
2026–	Brisbane Roar	0	(0)

International career^{‡}
2017	Australia U20	1	(0)
2021	Australia U23	4	(0)
2022	Australia	4	(0)
Medal record
Men's soccer
Representing Australia
AFF U-16 Youth Championship
First place	2016 Cambodia	U-17 Team
Third place	2015 Cambodia	U-17 Team
- * Club domestic league appearances and goals as of 26 April 2026 ‡ National team caps and goals as of 25 September 2022

Joel Bruce King (born 30 October 2000) is an Australian professional soccer player who plays as a left-back for Brisbane Roar.

== Club career ==
=== Sydney FC ===
King made his professional debut for Sydney FC in a Round 27 clash against Newcastle Jets, playing the full game in a 2–0 loss at McDonald Jones Stadium. On 9 May 2019, he signed his first professional contract with the club, penning a one-year deal for the 2019–2020 season. King cemented his spot in the Sydney team, and started in every game for Sydney during the 2020-21 season with regular fullback Michael Zullo missing the majority of the season with a recurring calf injury. His consistent performances during the season resulted in him winning the 2020–21 Young Footballer of the Year at the end of the season, becoming the first Sydney FC player to do so.

=== Odense Boldklub ===
On 29 January 2022, it was announced that King had signed with Danish club OB after triggering a six figure release clause.

==== Loan to Sydney FC ====
In February 2023, King was loaned back to former club Sydney FC until the end of the 2022–23 A-League Men season. King made 13 appearances in his loan spell, including starts in an elimination final win over derby rivals Western Sydney Wanderers, and in both legs of the semi-final tie against Melbourne City.

=== Return to Sydney FC ===
In June 2023, King re-signed with Sydney FC on a permanent basis, signing a three-year deal with the club. King made his 100th appearance for the club on 29 December 2023, in a 3–1 win over Wellington Phoenix at Allianz Stadium. He scored his first goal for Sydney on 30 March 2024, in a 2–0 win over the Central Coast Mariners.

On 23 August 2025, King made his 150th appearance for Sydney FC against Auckland FC in the quarter-finals of the 2025 Australia Cup.

== International career ==
=== Australian under-23s ===
King was called up to the Australian under-23 squad for the delayed 2020 Tokyo Olympics by manager Graham Arnold. He made his debut in a friendly warm up game for the Olympics against New Zealand in a 0–2 loss. King provided an assist for Australia's first goal of the tournament, scored by Lachlan Wales against Argentina in which Australia ran out 2–0 winners.

=== Australia ===
King was called up to the Socceroos squad by manager Graham Arnold for their 2022 FIFA World Cup qualification match against Vietnam as regular left back Aziz Behich was unable to take part. He started the match and put in a good performance with Australia winning 4–0.

King was called up to the Socceroos squad for the 2022 FIFA World Cup.

== Personal life ==
King's older sister Taren also plays professional football, she is currently the captain of Central Coast Mariners.

== Career statistics ==
=== Club ===
As of 26 April 2026

Club	Season	League			Cup		Continental		Total	
Club	Season	Division	Apps	Goals	Apps	Goals	Apps	Goals	Apps	Goals
Sydney FC	2018–19	A-League	1	0	0	0	2	0	3	0
Sydney FC	2019–20	A-League	26	0	1	0	5	0	32	0
Sydney FC	2020–21	A-League	28	0	—		—		28	0
Sydney FC	2021–22	A-League Men	8	0	4	0	0	0	12	0
Sydney FC	Total		63	0	5	0	7	0	75	0
OB	2021–22	Danish Superliga	11	0	1	0	—		12	0
OB	2022–23	Danish Superliga	5	0	1	1	—		6	1
OB	Total		16	0	2	1	0	0	18	1
Sydney FC (loan)	2022–23	A-League Men	13	0	0	0	—		13	0
Sydney FC	2023–24	A-League Men	20	3	4	0	—		24	3
Sydney FC	2024–25	A-League Men	23	1	1	0	11	0	35	1
Sydney FC	2025–26	A-League Men	9	0	3	0	—		10	0
Sydney FC	Total		65	4	8	0	11	0	82	4
Career total			142	4	15	1	18	0	175	5

=== International ===
As of 25 September 2022

National team	Year	Apps	Goals
Australia	2022	4	0
Total		4	0

== Honours ==
=== Club ===
Sydney FC

- A-League Championship: 2019–20
- A-League Premiership: 2019–20
- Australia Cup: 2023

=== International ===
Australia U17

- AFF U-16 Youth Championship: 2016

=== Individual ===
- A-League Young Footballer of the Year: 2020–21
