= Anton Kinnander =

Swedish footballer

Personal information
- Full name: Lars Anton Kinnander
- Date of birth: 23 February 1996 (age 30)
- Place of birth: Bårslöv, Sweden
- Height: 1.84 m (6 ft 0 in)
- Position: Forward

Team information
- Current team: Ängelholms FF
- Number: 20

Youth career
- 2001–2004: Bårslövs BoIF
- 2005–2010: Eskilsminne IF
- 2011–2013: Helsingborgs IF

Senior career*
| Years | Team | Apps | (Gls) |
| 2013–2016 | Helsingborgs IF | 6 | (0) |
| 2013 | → HIF Akademi (loan) | 20 | (15) |
| 2014 | → HIF Akademi (loan) | 10 | (3) |
| 2015 | → Motala AIF (loan) | 10 | (3) |
| 2016–2018 | Eskilsminne IF | 16 | (4) |
| 2019 | Torns IF | 25 | (6) |
| 2020–2022 | Ängelholms FF | 37 | (14) |
| 2022–2023 | Altona Magic | 7 | (2) |
| 2023 | Melbourne Knights | 1 | (0) |
| 2024– | Ängelholms FF | 6 | (0) |

International career
| 2013–2014 | Sweden U19 | 5 | (1) |
- * Club domestic league appearances and goals as of 1 January 2025

Anton Kinnander (born 23 February 1996) is a Swedish footballer who plays as a forward for Ängelholms FF.

== Career ==
After a season with Torns IF, it was announced on 27 November 2020, that Kinnander had joined Ängelholms FF for the 2020 season.

In 2022, Kinnander moved to Australia to join Altona Magic and after a season, moved to join Melbourne Knights.
