= 2023 Australia Cup =

2023 season of Australia's national knockout soccer competition

Tournament details
- Country: Australia; New Zealand
- Dates: 9 February – 7 October 2023
- Teams: 778 (qualifying competition); 32 (main competition)

Final positions
- Champions: Sydney FC (2nd title)
- Runners-up: Brisbane Roar
- AFC Champions League Two: Sydney FC

Tournament statistics
- Matches played: 31
- Goals scored: 119 (3.84 per match)
- Attendance: 70,454 (2,273 per match)
- Top goal scorer: Lachlan Brook (5 goals)

The 2023 Australia Cup was the 10th season of the Australia Cup, the main national soccer knockout cup competition in Australia. Thirty-two teams contested the competition proper, with the winner qualifying for the 2024–25 AFC Champions League Two.

Macarthur FC were the defending champions, but were eliminated by Campbelltown City in the Round of 32.

Sydney FC won its second Australia Cup after defeating Brisbane Roar in the final. This also resulted in qualification to the group stage of the AFC's 2024–25 AFC Champions League Two competition.

== Round and dates ==
Round	Draw date	Match dates	Number of fixtures	Teams	New entries this round
Preliminary rounds	Various	9 February–18 July	746	778 → 32	770
Round of 32	28 June	4–14 August	16	32 → 16	8
Round of 16	14 August	26–30 August	8	16 → 8	None
Quarter-finals	30 August	14–17 September	4	8 → 4	None
Semi-finals	17 September	24 September	2	4 → 2	None
Final	—	7 October	1	2 → 1	None

== Teams ==
A total of 32 teams participated in the 2023 Australia Cup competition proper.

A-League Men clubs represent the highest level in the Australian league system, whereas Member Federation clubs come from level 2 and below.

A-League Men clubs
Adelaide United	Brisbane Roar	Central Coast Mariners	Macarthur FC
Melbourne City	Newcastle Jets	Sydney FC	Wellington Phoenix
Western Sydney Wanderers	Western United		
Member federation clubs
(Australian Capital Territory) Canberra Croatia (2)	(New South Wales) APIA Leichhardt (2)	(New South Wales) Inter Lions (3)	(New South Wales) Mt Druitt Town Rangers (2)
(New South Wales) Sydney United 58 (2)	(New South Wales) Edgeworth FC (2)	(New South Wales) Broadmeadow Magic (2)	(Northern Territory) Hellenic Athletic (2)
(Queensland) Gold Coast Knights (2)	(Queensland) Lions FC (2)	(Queensland) Moreton Bay United (2)	(Queensland) Peninsula Power (2)
(South Australia) Campbelltown City (2)	(South Australia) North Eastern MetroStars (2)	(Tasmania) Devonport City Strikers (2)	(Victoria (state)) Goulburn Valley Suns (4)
(Victoria (state)) Heidelberg United (2)	(Victoria (state)) Melbourne Knights (2)	(Victoria (state)) Northcote City (3)	(Victoria (state)) Oakleigh Cannons (2)
(Western Australia) Floreat Athena (2)	(Western Australia) Inglewood United (2)		

== Preliminary rounds ==
Member federation teams competed in various state-based preliminary rounds to win one of 22 places in the competition proper (at the Round of 32). All Australian clubs (other than youth teams associated with A-League franchises) were eligible to enter the qualifying process through their respective member federation; however, only one team per club was permitted entry into the competition. The preliminary rounds operate within a consistent national structure whereby club entry into the competition is staggered in each state/territory, determined by what level the club sits at in the Australian soccer league system. This ultimately leads to round 7 with the winning clubs from that round entering directly into the round of 32. Slot allocations were the same as the previous year.

The top eight placed A-League Men clubs from the 2022–23 A-League Men season gained automatic qualification to the Round of 32. The remaining four teams entered a play-off series to determine the remaining two positions.

Federation	Associated competition	Round of 32 qualifiers
Football Australia	A-League Men	10
Capital Football (ACT)	Federation Cup (ACT)	1
Football NSW	Waratah Cup	4
Northern NSW Football	NNSWF State Cup	2
Football Northern Territory	NT Australia Cup Final	1
Football Queensland	—	4
Football South Australia	Federation Cup (SA)	2
Football Tasmania	Milan Lakoseljac Cup	1
Football Victoria	Dockerty Cup	5
Football West (WA)	State Cup	2

== Bracket ==
Round of 32
North Eastern MetroStars	5
Inglewood United	0
Hellenic Athletic	0
Inter Lions	6
Oakleigh Cannons	2
Melbourne City	3
Peninsula Power	1
Wellington Phoenix (a.e.t.)	2
Goulburn Valley Suns	1
APIA Leichhardt	4
Sydney FC (p)	3 (10)
Central Coast Mariners	3 (9)
Gold Coast Knights	1
Devonport City Strikers	0
Edgeworth FC	0
Western United	4
Melbourne Knights	4
Lions FC	1
Campbelltown City	2
Macarthur FC	1
Mt Druitt Town Rangers	3
Canberra Croatia	1
Moreton Bay United	0
Heidelberg United	3
Broadmeadow Magic	2
Sydney United 58	4
Newcastle Jets	2
Brisbane Roar (a.e.t.)	3
Floreat Athena	1
Western Sydney Wanderers	6
Northcote City	0
Adelaide United	2

Round of 16
North Eastern MetroStars	1
Inter Lions	0
Melbourne City	3
Wellington Phoenix	0
APIA Leichhardt	0
Sydney FC	2
Gold Coast Knights	0
Western United	2
Melbourne Knights	2
Campbelltown City	0
Mt Druitt Town Rangers	0
Heidelberg United	3
Sydney United 58	0
Brisbane Roar	5
Western Sydney Wanderers	5
Adelaide United	1

Quarter-finals
North Eastern MetroStars	1
Melbourne City	2
Sydney FC	3
Western United	0
Melbourne Knights	3
Heidelberg United	2
Brisbane Roar	4
Western Sydney Wanderers	2

Semi-finals
Melbourne City	1
Sydney FC	2
Melbourne Knights	0
Brisbane Roar	1

Final
Sydney FC	3
Brisbane Roar	1

== Round of 32 ==
The round of 32 draw took place on 28 June 2023. The lowest ranked side that qualified for this round was Goulburn Valley Suns. They were the only level 4 team left in the competition.

4 August 2023	Broadmeadow Magic (2)	2–4	Sydney United 58 (2)	Newcastle
19:30	Stewardson 26'; Wells 45+2'	Report	Antelmi 23' (pen.); Vlastelica 34'; Clut 54'; Lacalandra 90+5'	Stadium: Magic Park; Attendance: 1,603; Referee: Alireza Faghani

4 August 2023	North Eastern MetroStars (2)	5–0	Inglewood United (2)	Adelaide
19:30 (19:00 ACST)	Temelkovski 9', 32'; Barbiero 50'; Nagel 67'; Cittadini 90+2'	Report		Stadium: T.K. Shutter Reserve; Attendance: 857; Referee: Daniel Elder

4 August 2023	Peninsula Power (2)	1–2 (a.e.t.)	Wellington Phoenix (1)	Brisbane
19:30	Greenwood 71'	Report	Pennington 43'; Rudland 119'	Stadium: A.J. Kelly Park; Attendance: 1,000; Referee: Shane Skinner

4 August 2023	Mt Druitt Town Rangers (2)	3–1	Canberra Croatia (2)	Sydney
19:30	Monahan-Vaiika 36'; Frangie 75', 81'	Report	Domenici 59'	Stadium: Popondetta Park; Attendance: 594; Referee: Sam Kelly

9 August 2023	Goulburn Valley Suns (4)	1–4	APIA Leichhardt (2)	Shepparton
19:30	Currie 78'	Report	Stewart 14' (pen.), 88'; Romero 60', 63'	Stadium: John McEwen Reserve; Attendance: 1,546; Referee: Jack Morgan

9 August 2023	Edgeworth FC (2)	0–4	Western United (1)	Newcastle
19:30		Report	Botic 20'; Ruhs 28'; Wales 31', 58'	Stadium: Jack McLaughlan Oval; Attendance: 1,275; Referee: Daniel Cook

9 August 2023	Gold Coast Knights (2)	1–0	Devonport City Strikers (2)	Gold Coast
19:30	Ludwik 54'	Report		Stadium: Gold Coast Croatian Sports Centre; Attendance: 720; Referee: Nathan Shakespear

9 August 2023	Floreat Athena (2)	1–6	Western Sydney Wanderers (1)	Perth
20:30 (18:30 AWST)	Ambrogio 53'	Report	Brook 3', 19', 77', 83', 90+2'; Borello 20'	Stadium: Kingsway Sporting Complex; Attendance: 723; Referee: Lachlan Keevers

10 August 2023	Moreton Bay United (2)	0–3	Heidelberg United (2)	Brisbane
19:00		Report	Sheppard 3'; Pin 15'; Ellis 53'	Stadium: Wolter Park; Attendance: 907

10 August 2023	Melbourne Knights (2)	4–1	Lions FC (2)	Melbourne
19:30	Albano 23', 79'; Sumaoro 35'; Hore 69'	Report	Pengelly 34'	Stadium: Knights Stadium; Attendance: 583

10 August 2023	Hellenic Athletic (2)	0–6	Inter Lions (3)	Darwin
19:30 (19:00 ACST)		Report	Duke 6', 20'; Green 40', 58'; Armson 45+1'; Quilligan 65' (pen.)	Stadium: Darwin Football Stadium; Attendance: 663

13 August 2023	Oakleigh Cannons (2)	2–3	Melbourne City (1)	Melbourne
14:00	Hampson 1'; Salmon 57'	Report	Arslan 49' (pen.), 80' (pen.); Lopane 90+4'	Stadium: Jack Edwards Reserve; Attendance: 2,652; Referee: Adam Kersey

13 August 2023	Sydney FC (1)	3–3 (a.e.t.) (10–9 p)	Central Coast Mariners (1)	Wollongong
15:00	Mak 42'; Wood 59'; Kucharski 120+3'	Report	Kuol 61'; Tulio 84' (pen.); Steele 100'	Stadium: WIN Stadium; Attendance: 2,540
	Penalties
	Caceres (penalty scored); Brattan (penalty scored); Kucharski (penalty scored); Girdwood-Reich (penalty scored); Segecic (penalty missed); Glasson (penalty scored); Adamson (penalty scored); King (penalty scored); Gurd (penalty scored); Scarcella (penalty scored); Redmayne (penalty scored)		(penalty scored) Theoharous; (penalty scored) Wenzel-Halls; (penalty scored) Hammond; (penalty missed) Steele; (penalty scored) Smith; (penalty scored) Nisbet; (penalty scored) Paull; (penalty scored) Hall; (penalty scored) Kaltack; (penalty scored) Farrell; (penalty missed) Warshawsky

14 August 2023	Campbelltown City (2)	2–1	Macarthur FC (1)	Adelaide
19:30 (19:00 ACST)	Yoshikawa 44'; Trimboli 51'	Report	Rose 90+3'	Stadium: Steve Woodcock Sports Centre; Attendance: 947; Referee: Adam Bavcar

14 August 2023	Newcastle Jets (1)	2–3 (a.e.t.)	Brisbane Roar (1)	Maitland
19:30	Buhagiar 12'; Taylor 58'	Report	Scott 45+3' (o.g.); Zabala 62'; Parsons 118'	Stadium: Maitland Sportsground; Attendance: 2,763; Referee: Ben Abraham

14 August 2023	Northcote City (3)	0–2	Adelaide United (1)	Melbourne
19:30		Report	Goodwin 6'; Clough 85'	Stadium: John Cain Memorial Park; Attendance: 1,652; Referee: Jack Morgan

== Round of 16 ==
The round of 16 draw took place on 14 August 2023. The lowest ranked side that qualified for this round was Inter Lions. They were the only level 3 team left in the competition.

26 August 2023	Sydney United 58 (2)	0–5	Brisbane Roar (1)	Sydney
14:00		Report	Hore 19'; Waddingham 40'; Mileusnic 56'; O'Shea 67' (pen.); MacNicol 81'	Stadium: Sydney United Sports Centre; Attendance: 1,050; Referee: Alireza Faghani

27 August 2023	Melbourne City (1)	3–0	Wellington Phoenix (1)	Melbourne
14:00	Arslan 37'; Maclaren 76', 78'	Report		Stadium: Jack Edwards Reserve; Attendance: 1,153; Referee: Lachlan Keevers

29 August 2023	Melbourne Knights (2)	2–0	Campbelltown City (2)	Melbourne
19:30	Sumaoro 40'; Hore 51'	Report		Stadium: Knights Stadium; Attendance: 950

29 August 2023	Western Sydney Wanderers (1)	5–1	Adelaide United (1)	Sydney
19:30	Antonsson 2', 45+1'; Borello 38', 56'; Ninković 53'	Report	Clough 81'	Stadium: Marconi Stadium; Attendance: 2,490; Referee: Ben Abraham

29 August 2023	North Eastern MetroStars (2)	1–0	Inter Lions (3)	Adelaide
19:30 (19:00 ACST)	Nagamatsu 90+2'	Report		Stadium: T.K. Shutter Reserve; Attendance: 1,142

30 August 2023	APIA Leichhardt (2)	0–2	Sydney FC (1)	Sydney
19:30		Report	Caceres 54'; Wood 66'	Stadium: Leichhardt Oval; Attendance: 4,601

30 August 2023	Gold Coast Knights (2)	0–2	Western United (1)	Gold Coast
19:30		Report	Walker 72' (o.g.); Grimaldi 90+4'	Stadium: Croatian Sports Centre; Attendance: 910

30 August 2023	Mt Druitt Town Rangers (2)	0–3	Heidelberg United (2)	Sydney
19:30		Report	Sheppard 5'; Ashton 40'; Abdallah Yunis 90+1'	Stadium: Popondetta Park; Attendance: 392

== Quarter-finals ==
The quarter-finals draw took place on 30 August 2023. The lowest ranked sides that qualified for this round were Heidelberg United, Melbourne Knights and North Eastern MetroStars. They were the only level 2 teams left in the competition.

14 September 2023	Melbourne Knights (2)	3–2	Heidelberg United (2)	Melbourne
19:30	Albano 29'; Kinnander 90'; Hore 90+6'	Report	Zahra 22' (pen.); Sheppard 25'	Stadium: Knights Stadium; Attendance: 2,236; Referee: Alex King

14 September 2023	North Eastern MetroStars (2)	1–2	Melbourne City (1)	Adelaide
19:30 (19:00 ACST)	Ayoubi 27'	Report	Good 84'; Arslan 90+5'	Stadium: T.K. Shutter Reserve; Attendance: 2,022; Referee: Shaun Evans

16 September 2023	Brisbane Roar (1)	4–2	Western Sydney Wanderers (1)	Brisbane
17:30	Armiento 29'; Waddingham 40'; Caletti 64'; Hore 72'	Report	Antonsson 18'; Clisby 57'	Stadium: Perry Park; Attendance: 3,926; Referee: Alireza Faghani

17 September 2023	Sydney FC (1)	3–0	Western United (1)	Sydney
15:00	Caceres 11'; Wood 29'; Rodwell 67'	Report		Stadium: Leichhardt Oval; Attendance: 2,916; Referee: Casey Reibelt

== Semi-finals ==
The semi-final draw took place on 17 September 2023. The lowest ranked side that qualified for this round was Melbourne Knights. They were the only level 2 team left in the competition.

24 September 2023	Melbourne City (1)	1–2	Sydney FC (1)	Melbourne
15:00 AEST	Maclaren 89'	Report	Wood 38'; Lolley 73'	Stadium: AAMI Park; Attendance: 2,267; Referee: Jack Morgan

24 September 2023	Melbourne Knights (2)	0–1	Brisbane Roar (1)	Melbourne
18:00 AEST		Report	Waddingham 18'	Stadium: Knights Stadium; Attendance: 10,892; Referee: Daniel Elder

== Final ==
The venue was originally set for Suncorp Stadium in Brisbane, but was changed to Sydney to the Allianz Stadium due to irrigation work.

7 October 2023
19:45 AEDT

Sydney FC (1)	3–1	Brisbane Roar (1)
Fábio 67' (pen.), 90+1'; Mak 72'	Report	Waddingham 18'

Allianz Stadium, Sydney
Attendance: 15,482
Referee: Ben Abraham

== Individual honours ==
The recipient of the Michael Cockerill Medal to recognise the tournament's standout National Premier Leagues performer was Hamish Gow from North Eastern MetroStars. Joe Lolley from Sydney FC won the Mark Viduka Medal for the player of the match in the final.

== Top goalscorers ==
Rank	Player	Club	Goals
1	(Australia) Lachlan Brook	Western Sydney Wanderers	5
2	(Germany) Tolgay Arslan	Melbourne City	4
2	(Australia) Thomas Waddingham	Brisbane Roar	4
2	(Australia) Patrick Wood	Sydney FC	4
5	(Australia) Gian Albano	Melbourne Knights	3
5	(Sweden) Marcus Antonsson	Western Sydney Wanderers	3
5	(Australia) Brandon Borrello	Western Sydney Wanderers	3
5	(Australia) Mitchell Hore	Melbourne Knights	3
5	(Australia) Jamie Maclaren	Melbourne City	3
5	(England) Kaine Sheppard	Heidelberg United	3

Note: Goals scored in preliminary rounds not included.
