= Gabriel Lacerda =

Brazilian footballer (born 1999)

Personal information
- Full name: Gabriel Santos Cordeiro Lacerda
- Date of birth: 29 August 1999 (age 27)
- Place of birth: Caieiras, Brazil
- Height: 1.90 m (6 ft 3 in)
- Position: Centre back

Team information
- Current team: Londrina
- Number: 15

Youth career
- 2013–2019: Palmeiras
- 2017: → Figueirense (loan)
- 2019–2020: Ceará

Senior career*
Years	Team	Apps	(Gls)
2020–2025	Ceará	88	(4)
2023–2024	→ Sydney FC (loan)	24	(0)
2026–	Londrina	27	(2)
- * Club domestic league appearances and goals as of 18 November 2026

Gabriel Santos Cordeiro Lacerda (born 29 August 1999) is a Brazilian professional footballer who plays as a central defender for Londrina.

== Club career ==
Born in Caieiras, São Paulo, Gabriel Lacerda began his career with Palmeiras in 2013. He served a loan stint at Figueirense in 2017, and moved to Atlético Mineiro in September 2018; the move later collapsed after he suffered a knee injury.

On 30 May 2019, Gabriel Lacerda agreed to a contract with Ceará, as his link with Palmeiras was due to expire. Initially assigned to the under-20s, he made his professional debut on 13 August 2020, starting in a 1–1 Série A home draw with Grêmio.

=== Loan to Sydney FC ===
A few days after his compatriot Fabio Gomes signed for Sydney, it was announced that Lacerda would also be signing for the Australian club, making his first move outside his Brazilian homeland. Lacerda would take the #15 jersey, which had not been worn at Sydney since the retirement of hall of fame member Terry McFlynn, with Lacerda stating that the number 15 was special to him as it's the number of his fathers birthday. Despite making over 20 appearances in the league for the harbourside club, Lacerda's loan was not extended at the end of the season.

== Career statistics ==
As of 20 March 2024

Club	Season	League			State League		Cup		Continental		Other		Total	
Club	Season	Division	Apps	Goals	Apps	Goals	Apps	Goals	Apps	Goals	Apps	Goals	Apps	Goals
Ceará	2020	Série A	9	0	0	0	2	0	—		0	0	11	0
Ceará	2021	Série A	23	4	4	0	0	0	0	0	3 (Note: Appearance(s) in Copa do Nordeste)	0	30	4
Ceará	2022	Série A	26	0	0	0	2	0	3 (Note: Appearance(s) in Copa Sudamericana)	0	3	0	34	0
Ceará	2023	Série B	10	0	3	0	2	0	—		6	0	21	0
Ceará	Total		68	4	7	0	6	0	3	0	12	0	96	4
Sydney FC (loan)	2023–24	A-League Men	18	0	—		2	0	—		—		20	0
Career total			86	4	7	0	8	0	3	0	12	0	116	4

== Honours ==
Ceará

- Copa do Nordeste: 2020, 2023

Sydney FC

- Australia Cup: 2023
