= Jack Rodwell =

English association football player (born 1991)

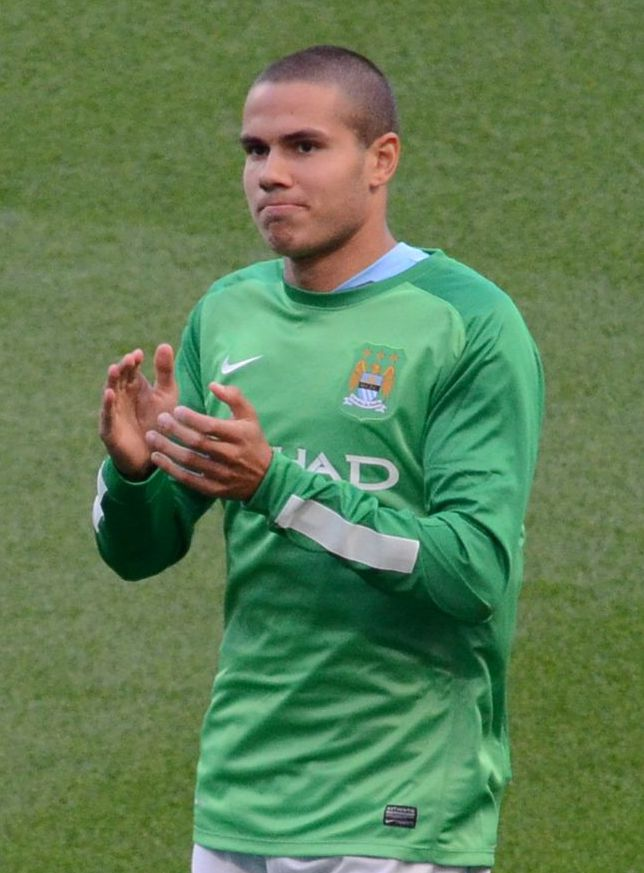
- Rodwell with Manchester City in 2013

Personal information
- Full name: Jack Christian Rodwell
- Date of birth: 11 March 1991 (age 35)
- Place of birth: Southport, England
- Height: 6 ft 2 in (1.88 m)
- Positions: Centre back; defensive midfielder

Youth career
- Birkdale United
- 1998–2007: Everton

Senior career*
Years	Team	Apps	(Gls)
2007–2012	Everton	85	(4)
2012–2014	Manchester City	16	(2)
2014–2018	Sunderland	67	(5)
2018–2019	Blackburn Rovers	21	(1)
2020–2021	Sheffield United	1	(0)
2021–2022	Western Sydney Wanderers	14	(3)
2022–2024	Sydney FC	22	(1)

International career^{‡}
2006–2007	England U16	4	(1)
2007–2008	England U17	9	(1)
2008–2009	England U19	4	(1)
2009–2012	England U21	21	(2)
2011–2013	England	3	(0)
Medal record
Men's football
Representing England
UEFA European Under-21 Championship
Runner-up	2009 Sweden
- * Club domestic league appearances and goals as of 22 May 2024 ‡ National team caps and goals as of 21:15, 25 January 2019 (UTC)

Jack Christian Rodwell (born 11 March 1991) is an English professional footballer who last played for A-League side Sydney FC as a centre-back or defensive midfielder.

Born in Southport, Merseyside, Rodwell joined Everton's academy at the age of seven, and made his debut in 2007. He spent five years in the first team before he transferred to Premier League champions Manchester City in 2012. After making only 16 league appearances in two seasons, Rodwell was sold to Sunderland in August 2014. After his contract with Sunderland was terminated in June 2018, Rodwell joined Blackburn Rovers in August on a one-year deal. He left Blackburn the following year, later joining Sheffield United in January 2020.

Rodwell has represented England at all levels from under-16 to the senior team. He made his senior international debut as a substitute in a 1–0 win over Spain at Wembley Stadium in November 2011.

== Early life ==
Jack Christian Rodwell was born on 11 March 1991, in Southport, Merseyside. He was educated at Farnborough Road Junior School and Birkdale High School, and was an avid supporter of Everton as a child. Rodwell played for local club Birkdale United during his school years before joining his boyhood club Everton's youth system at age seven.

According to his mother, Carol, she talked about his childhood, saying: "As a child Jack ate, drank and slept football. I think his ambition was always to be a professional, although he didn't speak about it. His heroes when he was growing up were Alan Shearer and the Brazilian striker Ronaldo. He used to follow players for their ability and not particularly what team they played for." Rodwell has a brother, Thomas.

== Club career ==
=== Everton ===
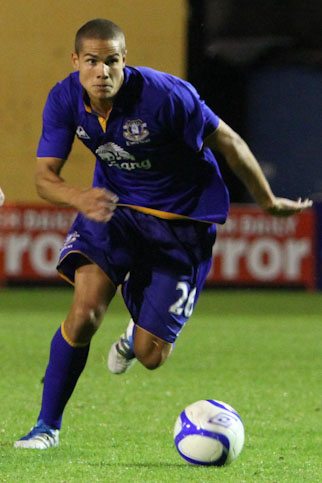
Rodwell playing for Everton in 2011.

Rodwell was a product of the youth system, making his under-18s debut at 14 and his debut for Everton's reserve team at the age of 15. At youth level, he started out of as having the potential to become a top centre back early in his professional career, but was primarily deployed as a defensive midfielder once in the senior team. Rodwell claimed that Lee Carsley contributed his role into helping play in the midfield position.

Rodwell then broke a record on his senior debut becoming the youngest player to represent Everton in Europe, when he came on as a substitute against Dutch team AZ at the age of 16 years and 284 days, as the club won 3–2. On 9 March 2008, Rodwell appeared as a substitute on his Premier League debut – before also featuring as a replacement in the final match of the season, replacing Tim Cahill in a 1–0 victory over Sunderland, and signed his first professional contract with Everton on 17 March 2008, after spending six years in the reserve team. At the end of the 2007–08 season, he made three appearances in all competitions. Following this, Rodwell was awarded the academy's Player of the Year.

Ahead of the 2008–09 season, Rodwell was called up to the club's first team squad for the pre–season tour. Rodwell made his first professional start against Blackburn Rovers on 16 August 2008, playing the full 90 minutes. Since the start of the 2008–09 season, he found his playing time was mostly from the substitute bench. Despite this, Rodwell continued to fight his way to earn a place in the starting eleven for the side. Rodwell scored his first senior goal for Everton in the FA Cup against Aston Villa in February 2009. After the match, Manager David Moyes praised his performance. That same month, he signed a five-year contract with Everton. Rodwell appeared as an unused substitute, as Everton loss 2–1 against Chelsea in the FA Cup Final. At the end of the 2008–09 season, Rodwell made twenty–five appearances and scoring once in all competitions.

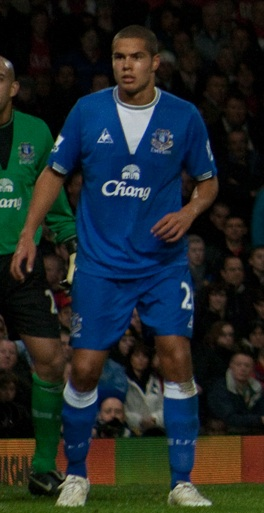
Rodwell playing for Everton against Manchester United on 21 November 2009.

At the beginning of the 2009–10 season, Rodwell earned his first start in European competition in a UEFA Europa League match against Czech Republic team Sigma Olomouc and he marked the occasion by scoring two long-range goals, helping Everton to a 4–0 win. In the return, Rodwell started the whole game and helped the club draw 1–1, resulting in the club progressing through to the group stage following a 5–1 win on aggregate. Since the start of the 2009–10 season, he started in the first eleven matches until missing one match, due to flu-like symptoms. After missing one match, Rodwell returned to the starting line–up against Stoke City, playing the whole game, in a 1–1 draw on 4 October 2009. However, he suffered a minor muscle injury during a 3–2 loss against Hull City on 25 November 2009, resulting in him missing two matches. His return was short–lived when Rodwell suffered a hamstring injury and was substituted in the 8th minute, as Everton loss 1–0 against BATE Borisov on 17 December 2009. Following this, he was out for two months with the injury.

On 10 February 2010, Rodwell returned to the first team from injury following a two-month absence, coming on as 74th-minute substitute, in a 2–1 win against Chelsea. In a follow–up match, he scored his first Premier League goal in Everton's 3–1 win against Manchester United. After the match, Rodwell was named Man of the Match. Two weeks later on 7 March 2010, he scored his second goal of the season, in a 5–1 win against Hull City. During the second half of the 2009–10 season, Rodwell became regularly used in more attacking midfield position. Despite suffering another injury later in the 2009–10 season, he made thirty–six appearances and scoring four times in all competitions. At the end of the 2009–10 season, Rodwell signed a five-year contract extension with Everton.

Ahead of the 2010–11 season, Rodwell said he would fight for his place in the first team following intense competition in the midfield positions. Rodwell scored, as well as setting up the club's third goal of the game, in a 5–1 win against Huddersfield Town in the third round of the League Cup. However, during a 1–0 loss against Aston Villa on 29 August 2010, he suffered an ankle injury that kept him out for three months. On 14 November 2010 Rodwell returned from injury, coming on as a second-half substitute in a 2–1 loss against Arsenal. Since returning from injury, Rodwell found himself rotated in and out of the starting eleven throughout the 2010–11 season. His performance led to transfer speculation that Rodwell made an agreement to join Manchester United, a claim that was denied by Manager Moyes. Despite being out on two occasions during the 2010–11 season, he went on to make twenty–eight appearances and scoring once in all competitions.

At the start of the 2011–12 season, Rodwell continued to remain as a first team regular, playing in the midfield position. This lasted until he was sent off in the 23rd minute during the 216th Merseyside derby on 1 October 2011 after making "what appeared to be a legitimate challenge on Suárez", according to the BBC. Shortly after, his red card was rescinded by The FA. Rodwell made his 100th appearance for Everton, playing the whole game, in a 3–1 loss against Chelsea on 15 October 2011. In a follow–up match against Fulham, he scored his first goal of the season, as well as, setting up the club's first goal of the game, in a 3–1 win. Two weeks later on 5 November 2011, Rodwell scored his second goal of the season, in a 2–1 loss against Newcastle United. He was later named the club's Player of the Month. However, Rodwell found himself plagued with injuries on two occasions that kept him out for the remainder of 2011. On 1 January 2012 he returned to the starting line–up against West Bromwich Albion, playing 57 minutes before being substituted in a 1–0 win. However, his return was short–lived when Rodwell suffered a hamstring injury that kept him out for two months. His return came on 10 March 2012 against Tottenham Hotspur, coming on as a 65th-minute substitute, in a 1–0 win. Once again, he suffered a slight recurrence of his recent hamstring complaint that eventually saw him out for the rest of the 2011–12 season. At the end of the 2011–12 season, Rodwell made seventeen appearances and scoring two times in all competitions.

=== Manchester City ===
In August 2012, Rodwell signed a five-year contract with Manchester City for a fee of £12 million, which could rise to £15 million. Upon joining the club, he said: "I relish the opportunity of playing with some of the best players in the world and continuing my development."

Rodwell made his Manchester City debut on 19 August 2012, in a 3–2 win at home to Southampton. He made his away debut on 26 August 2012, coming on as a second-half substitute against Liverpool at Anfield in a 2–2 draw. Rodwell made his UEFA Champions League debut, starting a match and played 56 minutes, in a 1–1 draw against Borussia Dortmund on 3 October 2012. After being out due to injury since October, Rodwell made a successful return to the team on 26 January 2013 in a 1–0 win away to Stoke City in the FA Cup. After appearing a total of four matches for the next two months, he suffered a hamstring injury that kept him out for two months. After two months out, Rodwell returned to the first team, coming on as an 85th-minute substitute, in a 0–0 draw against Swansea City on 4 May 2013. He then came on as a 69th-minute substitute in the FA Cup Final against Wigan Athletic, as Manchester City loss 1–0. On the final day of the 2012–13 season, Rodwell scored both of Manchester City's goals in a 3–2 home defeat to Norwich City, his first goals for the club. At the end of the season, he went on to make fifteen appearances and scoring two times in all competitions.

In the 2013–14 season, Rodwell made his first appearance of the season, playing the whole game, in a 0–0 draw against Stoke City on 14 September 2013. However, he found his first team opportunities limited, due to strong competition in the midfield position. Rodwell also faced his own injury concern. Despite this, he made ten appearances in all competitions, five of which were the league, making him eligible for a winner's medal when Manchester City became 2013–14 Premier League champions. Following this, it was expected that Rodwell was to leave the club in the summer.

=== Sunderland ===
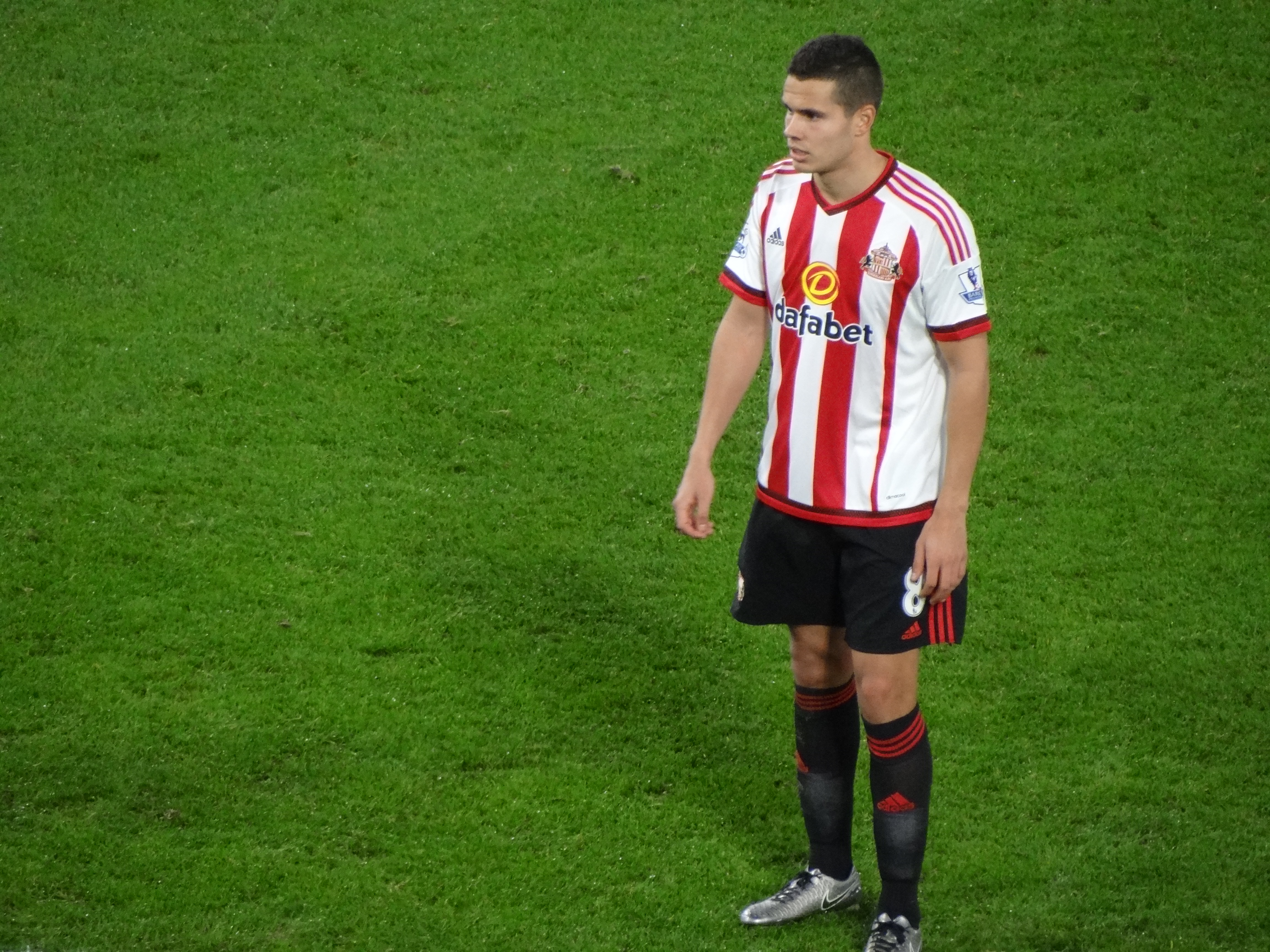
Rodwell playing for Sunderland in 2015

On 5 August 2014, Sunderland announced that Rodwell had signed a five-year contract for an undisclosed fee believed to be around £10 million. Upon joining the club, he was critical about his time at Manchester City and urged English players to think twice before joining them.

Rodwell made his Sunderland debut, starting a match and playing 68 minutes before being substituted, in a 2–2 draw against West Bromwich Albion in the opening game of the season. On 24 August 2014, he scored his first goal for the club, equalising for Sunderland in their 1–1 draw with Manchester United at the Stadium of Light. Since making his debut for the club, Rodwell became a first team regular in the first four months to the 2014–15 season. This lasted until he missed one match against Crystal Palace, due to a calf injury. Following his return, Rodwell found himself alternating between a starting and a substitute role by the end of the year. On 1 January 2015, he scored Sunderland's first goal in a dramatic match with former club Manchester City with the match ending in a 3–2 loss for Sunderland. On 24 January 2015, Rodwell was sent off after receiving two yellow cards in the FA Cup fourth round against Fulham, in a match that ended 0–0. Between January and March, he found himself out of the first team due to injuries and suspension. His third goal of the season came on 3 March 2015, where Rodwell scored the equaliser in a 1–1 draw away to Hull City, in a match where he was also booked for diving. Despite being on the sidelines on two occasions later in the 2014–15 season, Rodwell continued to be involved in the first team. By the end of the 2014–15 season, he had made 26 appearances, scoring three times in all competitions.

On 25 August 2015, Rodwell scored two goals and made two assists in Sunderland's 6–3 win over Exeter City in the second round of the 2015–16 League Cup. At the start of the 2015–16 season, he continued to alternate between a starting and a substitute role. Due to the club's defensive crisis, Rodwell offered to play in the position when offered by Manager Dick Advocaat. However, this never happened, as Advocaat was sacked and replaced by Sam Allardyce, who decided against letting him play in the position. But he was out on four occasions by the end of the year. Despite recovering from injuries, Rodwell, once again, alternated between a starting and a substitute role later in the 2015–16 season. In the last game of the season Rodwell scored in a 2–2 draw against Watford. By the end of the 2015–16 season, he had made 24 appearances, scoring three times in all competitions.

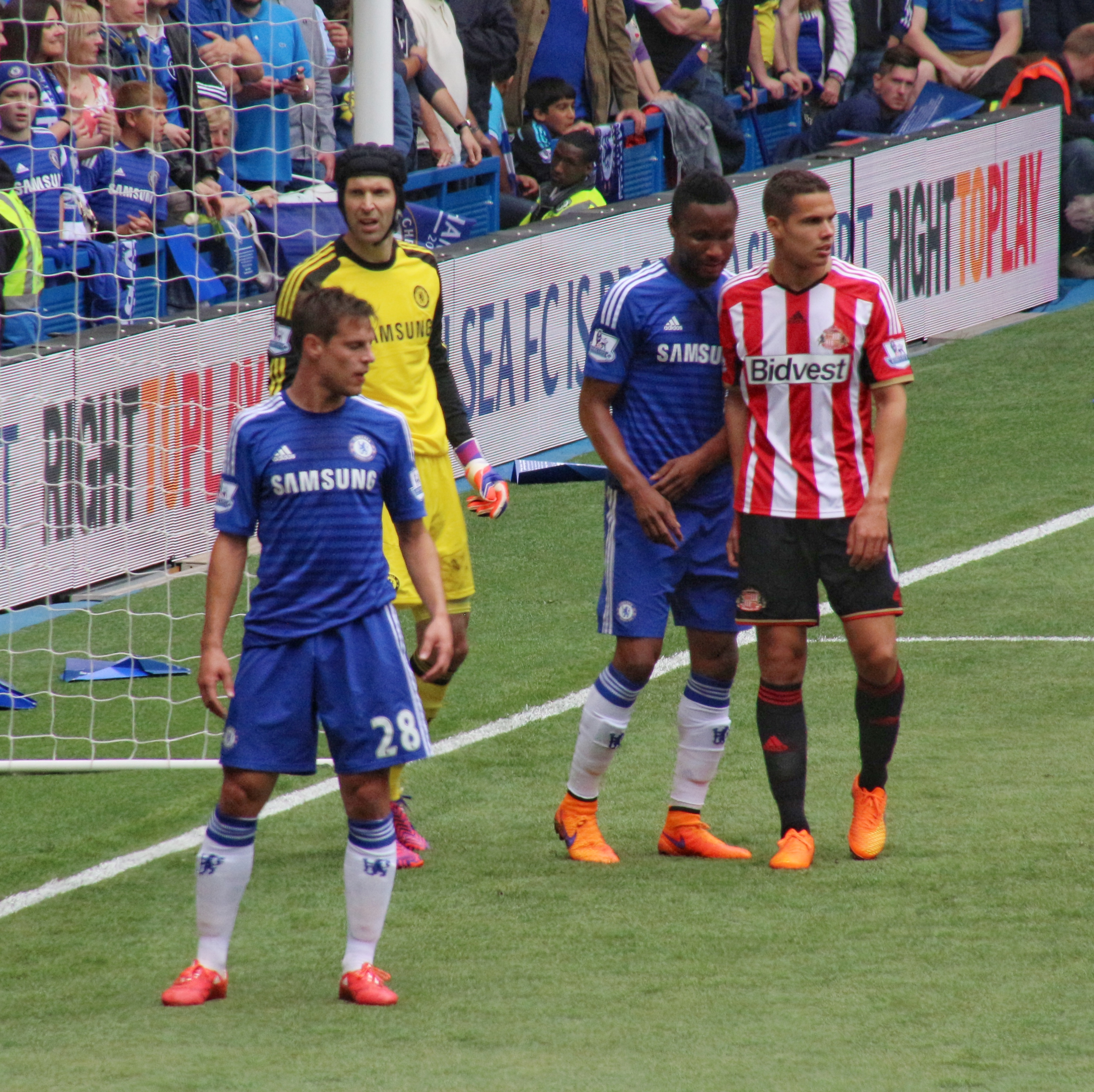
Rodwell being marked by Mikel John Obi during Sunderland's 3–2 loss against Chelsea on 24 May 2015.

In the opening game of the 2016–17 season, Rodwell set up Sunderland's first goal of the game, losing 2–1 against his former club, Manchester City. His starts in the next four matches proved to be his comeback. However, he missed two matches for the side despite being fit. On 1 October 2016 Rodwell returned to the first team, coming on as a 72nd-minute substitute, in a 1–1 draw against West Bromwich Albion. However, he suffered a hamstring injury that kept him out for the rest of 2016. On 2 January 2017 Rodwell returned to the starting line–up and played 65 minutes before being substituted in a 2–2 draw against Liverpool. On 4 February 2017, in a 4–0 win for Sunderland against Crystal Palace, he ended a drought of 1,370 days without winning a Premier League game in which he had started the match. His winless run had lasted for 39 Premier League matches. Since returning from injury, Rodwell continued to find himself in and out of the starting eleven later in the 2016–17 season. Eventually, Sunderland were relegated from the Premier League. By the end of the 2016–17 season, he had made 23 appearances in all competitions.

Ahead of the 2017–18 season, Rodwell avoided taking a cut despite Sunderland's relegation from the Premier League, although the club were willing to sell him, but he ended up staying throughout the summer. He scored on his first appearance of the 2017–18 season, in a 2–1 loss against Sheffield United on 9 September 2017. As months went by, Rodwell was dropped from the first team once again, due to competition, as well as his own injury concern. The club's supporters turned on him after rating him low on the survey conducted by local newspaper Evening Chronicle.

It was reported that Rodwell asked to leave Sunderland in January 2018 after not making an appearance for the first team since September 2017. Rodwell went on a trial at SBV Vitesse, only to for it to be cancelled, citing 'organisational reasons'. Rodwell eventually stayed at the club after the January transfer window closed. When asked in April 2018, after Sunderland were relegated for a second successive season, manager Chris Coleman said he did not know where the midfielder was mentally. It was later revealed that the pair had fallen out and didn't see eye to eye as a result. At the end of the 2017–18 season, Rodwell made six appearances and scoring once in all competitions.

His contract was terminated by the club on 27 June 2018. Upon leaving Sunderland, local newspaper Evening Chronicle was critical of the club signing him, even going far as calling him the worst signing in Sunderland's history, while The Northern Echo agreed.

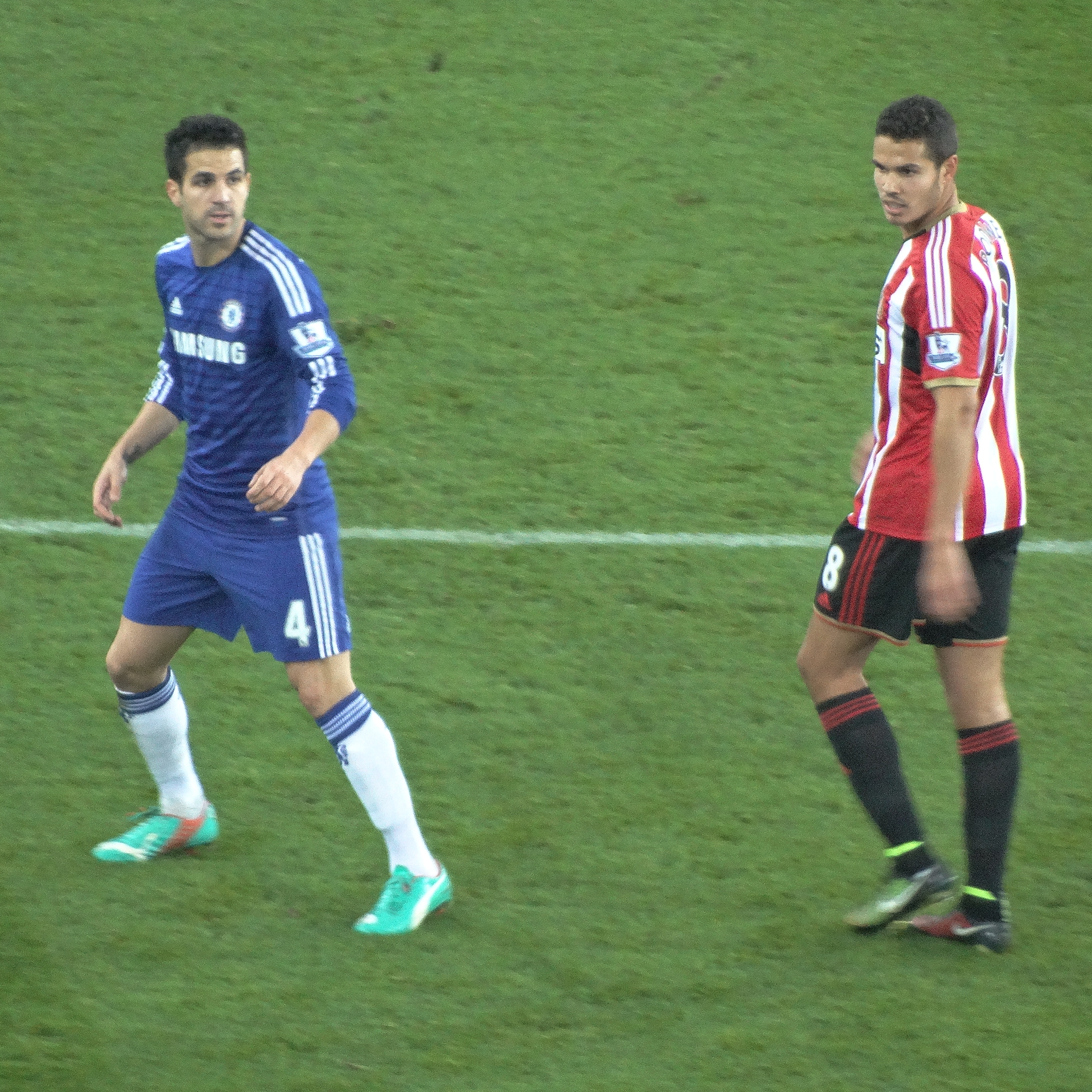
Rodwell and Cesc Fàbregas during Premier League match between Sunderland and Chelsea on 29 November 2014.

=== Blackburn Rovers ===
Rodwell signed for Championship club Blackburn Rovers on 23 August 2018 on a one-year deal, lasting until the end of the 2018–19 season. Upon joining the club, he said: "It's important for me to get out there and start playing football again. There have been ups and downs over the years, but that's in the past and now I'm just looking forward and focussed on the future ahead. After meeting the manager, I feel it's an ambitious club and a great fit for me. He sold the club to me and came across really well. I've played here a few times during my time at Everton and enjoyed playing at Ewood Park, so I'm looking forward to playing there in a Blackburn shirt now. After meeting the gaffer I could tell he loves his role and is very passionate about the club. I can't wait to get playing under him."

After spending a month on the sidelines, Rodwell made his Blackburn Rovers debut, playing in the centre–back position and playing 59 minutes before being substituted, in a 3–2 loss against AFC Bournemouth in the third round of the League Cup. Since making his debut for the club, he started out, rotating in the defensive midfield position and centre–back position for the next two months. This lasted until Rodwell suffered an injury from a challenge of an opposition player during a 3–1 loss against Wigan Athletic on 28 November 2018. It was not until on 26 December 2018 when Rodwell returned to the starting line–up, playing in the defensive midfield position, in a 3–2 loss against Leeds United. But his return was short–lived when he suffered a groin injury once again. He returned to the starting line–up, playing in the centre–back position, starting the whole game, in a 2–0 win against Millwall on 12 January 2019.

Rodwell scored his first goal for Blackburn Rovers, in a 3–0 win against Hull City on 26 January 2019. Since returning from injury, Rodwell continued to regain his first team place, playing in the centre–back position for the next two months. This lasted until he suffered a muscle strain that kept him out for a month. Although Rodwell returned to training in late–March, he didn't make an appearance until on 13 April 2019 against Nottingham Forest, coming on as a 69th-minute substitute, in a 2–1 win. Following this, Rodwell reverted to playing in the midfield position in the next three matches. At the end of the 2018–19 season, he went on to make twenty–two appearances and scoring once in all competitions for the club.

Following this, Rodwell was offered a new contract by Blackburn Rovers. However, he left the club upon the expiration of his contract, despite being offered a new deal. After leaving Blackburn Rovers, Rodwell was linked with a transfer to Italian side Roma, but was ultimately not offered a contract.

=== Sheffield United ===
On 3 January 2020, Rodwell signed for Premier League club Sheffield United on a contract until the end of the season. It came after when he had been training with the team since December 2019. Upon joining Sheffield United, Manager Chris Wilder defended Rodwell following his appearance in the Netflix series Sunderland 'Til I Die.

Rodwell made his debut for Sheffield United two days later in an FA Cup third round match against AFC Fylde. However, Rodwell spent the first two months at the club out of the starting eleven by the time the season was suspended because of the COVID-19 pandemic. Once the season resumed behind closed doors, he made his first Premier League appearance in three years, coming on as a 75th-minute substitute, in a 1–1 draw against Burnley on 5 July 2020. By the end of the 2019–20 season, Rodwell had made two appearances in all competitions.

On 23 August 2020, Rodwell signed a new one-year deal, keeping him at the club until 2021. He played a single game during the 2020–21 season and was released on 1 June 2021.

=== Western Sydney Wanderers ===
After playing professionally in England for 15 years, Rodwell took up a new challenge, moving to Australia with his Australian wife and son, saying: "Physically, when I'm fit, I'm a young 30. I haven't actually got loads of miles on the clock and I can carry on. The chance for Australia came up and we made the decision as a family". He rejected any suggestion that the A-League is a "retirement league", due to the athleticism of "young and fit" footballers that is challenge for him to "replenished 'engine to get up and down'". On 18 November 2021, Australian A-League Men club Western Sydney Wanderers announced Rodwell had signed for the club on a one-year deal after training with them for two weeks under manager Carl Robinson.

He made his debut for Western Sydney Wanderers debut, coming on as a 77th minute substitute, in a 0–0 draw against Sydney FC on 20 November 2021. Rodwell made his first start in more than two and a half years, in a 2–0 win against Wellington Phoenix on 3 December 2021. After missing two matches due to injury, he scored his first goal for the club on his return from injury, in a 3–3 draw against Melbourne City on 9 January 2022. Four weeks later on 5 February 2022, Rodwell captained his first match at Western Sydney Wanderers against Perth Glory and scored the winning goal, in a 1–0 win. However, he spent the next two months out due to injuries on two occasions. After returning from injury, Rodwell scored his third goal for the club, in a 3–2 win against Newcastle Jets on 20 April 2022. By the end of the 2021–22 season, he had made 14 appearances, scoring three times in all competitions.

Rodwell was named as captain of the A-League All-Stars team in a friendly with Barcelona in May 2022 after being called up. On 1 July 2022, Western Sydney Wanderers began talks with Rodwell over a new contract.

=== Sydney ===
Rodwell signed for Sydney in August 2022 on a two-year contract with the Sky Blues.

Just under four months later, on 10 December, Rodwell made his Sydney debut in a 2–1 win over Melbourne City. After joining Sydney, Rodwell mostly played in the centre–back position, forming a partnership with Alex Wilkinson. He helped the club qualify the finals series and reached the semi–finals, in which Sydney lost 5–1 against Melbourne City. However, his first season with the club was beset by recurring injuries. Despite this, Rodwell made thirteen appearances in all competitions.

At the start of the 2023–24 season, Rodwell scored his first goal for the Sky Blues, in a 3–0 win against Western United in the quarter–finals of the Australian Cup. However, he went on to suffer a hamstring injury that would ultimately rule him out of action for two months. While out with an injury, Sydney won the Australia Cup.

On 16 December 2023, Rodwell returned to the starting line–up for Sydney, a 3–0 defeat against Melbourne Victory. The following week, on 23 December, Rodwell scored one of Sydney's four goals in their 4–2 victory over Western United. It would be yet another injury stricken season for Rodwell, who was ruled out of action on three occasions due to injury. Despite this, Rodwell helped Sydney overcome Macarthur 4–0 in the elimination-finals. However in the semi–finals against Central Coast Mariners, he received a straight red card in the 63rd minute for an unprofessional foul.

On 22 May 2024, Sydney announced Rodwell as one of the players that would depart the club upon the expiration of his contract on 30 June.

== International career ==
=== England youth teams ===
In September 2006, Rodwell was called up to the England U16 squad for the first time. He captained on his England U16 debut, and started the whole match, in a 1–1 draw against Wales U16 on 20 October 2006. Two months later, in December 2006, Rodwell captained the England under-16 team to Victory Shield glory, following a 2–1 victory over Scotland. Four months later, he struck the first winning goal at Wembley Stadium for England in a 1–0 win over Spain U16. Rodwell went on to make four appearances and scored once for the U16 side.

In July 2006, Rodwell was called up to the England U17 squad for the first time but did not play. After being called up to the U17 squad once again, he made his England U17 debut, in a 2–0 win against Iceland U17 on 30 July 2007. On 25 March 2008, Rodwell scored England under-17s only goal as they drew 1–1 with France in a 2008 UEFA European Under-17 Championship qualifier. He went on to make nine appearances and scoring once for the U17 side.

Rodwell made his England U19 debut on 9 September 2008, where he played 45 minutes, in a 2–1 win against Netherlands U19. He went on to make four appearances for the U19 side.

=== England under-21 team ===
In March 2009, Rodwell was called up to the England U21 squad for the first time. He earned his first under-21 cap in a match against France U21. and scored his first goal for the squad on 8 June 2009 against Azerbaijan. Rodwell earned his first start at under-21 level during the 2009 UEFA European Under-21 Championship in a match against Germany, scoring a goal and earning praise for his all-around performance in a defensive midfield role. He then helped England reach the final of the tournament by beating Sweden U21 5–4 on penalties following a 3–3 draw against Sweden in the semi-finals of the 2009 Under-21 European Championship. However, Rodwell came on as a 77th-minute substitute, as England loss 4–0 to Germany U21 in the final of the Under-21 Championships.

Following the end of the tournament, Rodwell made three more appearances for the U21 side by the end of 2009. He then captained England U21 for the first time, helping them win 2–0 against Uzbekistan U21 on 10 August 2010. Rodwell went on to make twenty–two appearances and scoring two times for the U21 side.

=== England senior team ===
In November 2011, Rodwell was called up to the senior England for the first time. He made his senior England debut, replacing Phil Jones in the 56th minute of England's 1–0 friendly victory against Spain, in November 2011. He made his first start three days later, in a 1–0 friendly win against Sweden at Wembley Stadium.

On 2 June 2013, Rodwell made his first appearance since 2011, earning his third cap as a substitute, replacing Theo Walcott in the second half of a 2–2 draw against Brazil. Two years later, he said he hadn't given up hope for England and remained determined to force his way back into the squad.

== Personal life ==
Rodwell is the nephew of former Blackpool footballer Tony Rodwell. In 2013 he married Alana Licate, an Australian national, and together they have two children. Since moving to Australia, he said his family has settled down in the country.

In September 2018, he was fined £660 with £166 in prosecution costs and a £66 victim surcharges at the earlier hearing after being banned from driving for six months without him knowing.

Rodwell modelled for Great Britain at the 2012 Summer Olympics in November 2011, hoping he would be included in the squad. However, he never made it to the squad despite being twenty at the time.

== Career statistics ==
=== Club ===
As of 22 July 2024

Appearances and goals by club, season and competition
Club	Season	League			National cup		League Cup		Europe		Total	
Club	Season	Division	Apps	Goals	Apps	Goals	Apps	Goals	Apps	Goals	Apps	Goals
Everton	2007–08	Premier League	2	0	0	0	0	0	1 (Note: Appearance in UEFA Cup)	0	3	0
Everton	2008–09	Premier League	19	0	5	1	1	0	0	0	25	1
Everton	2009–10	Premier League	26	2	0	0	2	0	8 (Note: Appearances in UEFA Europa League)	2	36	4
Everton	2010–11	Premier League	24	0	3	0	1	1	—		28	1
Everton	2011–12	Premier League	14	2	0	0	3	0	—		17	2
Everton	Total		85	4	8	1	7	1	9	2	109	8
Manchester City	2012–13	Premier League	11	2	3	0	0	0	1 (Note: Appearance in UEFA Champions League)	0	15	2
Manchester City	2013–14	Premier League	5	0	1	0	3	0	1	0	10	0
Manchester City	Total		16	2	4	0	3	0	2	0	25	2
Sunderland	2014–15	Premier League	23	3	2	0	1	0	—		26	3
Sunderland	2015–16	Premier League	22	1	0	0	2	2	—		24	3
Sunderland	2016–17	Premier League	20	0	1	0	2	0	—		23	0
Sunderland	2017–18	Championship	2	1	0	0	1	0	—		3	1
Sunderland	Total		67	5	3	0	6	2	—		76	7
Sunderland U23	2017–18	—			—		—		3 (Note: Appearances in EFL Trophy)	0	3	0
Blackburn Rovers	2018–19	Championship	21	1	0	0	1	0	—		22	1
Sheffield United	2019–20	Premier League	1	0	1	0	0	0	—		2	0
Sheffield United	2020–21	Premier League	0	0	0	0	0	0	—		0	0
Sheffield United	Total		1	0	1	0	0	0	—		2	0
Western Sydney Wanderers	2021–22	A-League Men	14	3	1	0	—		—		15	3
Western Sydney Wanderers	Total		14	3	1	0	0	0	0	0	15	3
Sydney FC	2022–23	A-League Men	13	0	0	0	—		—		13	0
Sydney FC	2023–24	A-League Men	9	1	3	1	—		—		12	2
Sydney FC	Total		22	1	3	1	0	0	0	0	25	2
Career total			226	16	20	2	17	3	14	2	277	23

=== International ===
As of match played 2 June 2013

Appearances and goals by national team and year
National team	Year	Apps	Goals
England	2011	2	0
England	2012	0	0
England	2013	1	0
Total		3	0

== Honours ==
Everton

- FA Cup runner-up: 2008–09

Manchester City

- Premier League: 2013–14
- FA Cup runner-up: 2012–13

Sydney FC

- Australia Cup: 2023

England U16

- Victory Shield: 2006

England U21

- UEFA European Under-21 Championship runner-up: 2009

Individual

- A-Leagues All Star: 2022
