= Matthew Scarcella =

Australian soccer player

Personal information
- Full name: Matthew Angelo Scarcella
- Date of birth: 4 March 2004 (age 22)
- Place of birth: Australia
- Height: 1.77 m (5 ft 10 in)
- Position: Defensive midfielder

Team information
- Current team: Hødd
- Number: 7

Youth career
- –2021: Sydney Olympic
- 2021–2022: Xanthi F.C.
- 2022–2025: Sydney FC

Senior career*
Years	Team	Apps	(Gls)
2021	Sydney Olympic	1	(0)
2023–2025	Sydney FC NPL	41	(0)
2023–2025	Sydney FC	6	(0)
2024–2025	→ Newcastle Jets (loan)	13	(0)
2025–	Hødd	37	(2)
- * Club domestic league appearances and goals as of 14 November 2026

Matthew Angelo Scarcella (born 4 March 2004) is an Australian soccer player who currently plays as a defensive midfielder for Hødd in the Norwegian First Division.

== Career ==
Scarcella pushed through the youth ranks at National Premier Leagues NSW club Sydney Olympic before signing for Greek sister club Xanthi F.C. with fellow players Mohamed Adam, and Fabian Monge. Whilst at Xanthi, Scarcella was called up for the Australian U23s 2022 AFC U-23 Asian Cup qualification.

Scarcella made his debut for Sydney FC in the 2023 Australia Cup Round of 32 against the Central Coast Mariners as a second half substitution, contributing with a converted penalty during the penalty shootout as Sydney FC defeated the Mariners 10–9 to progress through to the round of 16.

=== Loan to Newcastle Jets ===
To aid his development and receive more match time, Sydney loaned out Scarcella to rival New South Wales A-League club Newcastle Jets in June 2024 ahead of the 2024–25 A-League season.

=== Hødd ===
In September 2025, Scarcella joined Norwegian side Hødd.

== Honours ==
Sydney FC

- Australia Cup: 2023
