= Fábio Gomes (footballer, born 1997) =

Brazilian footballer

Personal information
- Full name: Fábio Roberto Gomes Netto
- Date of birth: 25 May 1997 (age 29)
- Place of birth: São Paulo, Brazil
- Height: 1.92 m (6 ft 4 in)
- Position: Centre-forward

Team information
- Current team: Cuiabá
- Number: 90

Youth career
- Nacional-SP
- 2016–2017: Grêmio Osasco

Senior career*
Years	Team	Apps	(Gls)
2017	Audax	6	(2)
2018–2021	Oeste	54	(24)
2018	→ Carlos Renaux (loan)	1	(0)
2020	→ Albirex Niigata (loan)	19	(5)
2021	→ New York Red Bulls (loan)	31	(7)
2022–2025	Atlético Mineiro	16	(3)
2022	→ Vasco da Gama (loan)	9	(1)
2023	→ Paços de Ferreira (loan)	9	(0)
2023	→ Juventude (loan)	4	(0)
2023–2024	→ Sydney FC (loan)	28	(11)
2024–2025	→ Bolívar (loan)	30	(18)
2025–2026	Mazatlán	21	(4)
2026–	Cuiabá	13	(2)
- * Club domestic league appearances and goals as of 18 November 2026

Fábio Roberto Gomes Netto (born 25 May 1997), known as Fábio Gomes or mononymously as Fábio, is a Brazilian professional footballer who plays as a centre-forward for Cuiabá.

== Club career ==
=== Early career ===
Born in São Paulo, Fábio Gomes started his career with the youth setup of Nacional-SP and switched to the academy of Grêmio Osasco in 2016. He signed his first contract in 2017 with Audax. A year later he moved to Oeste in Itápolis.

=== Audax ===
Fábio Gomes made his professional debut with Audax on 13 August 2017 as a halftime substitute in a Copa Paulista 0–0 draw against Inter de Limeira. On 30 August 2017, he scored his first goal for the club in a 3–1 victory against Atibaia.

=== Oeste ===
Fábio Gomes debuted with Oeste on 8 March 2019 and scored his first goal for the club in a 2–1 defeat against Red Bull Brasil in the Campeonato Paulista. On 27 July 2019, Fábio scored his first goal in Série B, scoring in the last minute of the match in a 1–0 victory against Londrina.

Fábio Gomes ended his first full season with Oeste Futebol Clube as the second top scorer in the Campeonato Brasileiro Série B with 15 goals. Fábio's play helped him draw the attention of Série A clubs, including Botafogo who were interested in signing him.

After a brief stint in Japan, Fábio Gomes returned to a struggling Oeste Futebol Clube in November 2020, scoring 5 goals in 15 appearances as the club was relegated to the Campeonato Brasileiro Série C. His last goal of the season came on 13 January 2021, when he scored the lone goal of the match in a 1–0 victory over Cruzeiro.

==== Loan to Albirex Niigata ====
In January 2020, Fábio Gomes signed with Japanese club, Albirex Niigata on loan in the J2 League. Fábio debuted with Albirex Niigata on 23 February 2020 as a 66th-minute substitute scoring the third goal for his club in a 3–0 victory over Thespakusatsu Gunma. He scored 5 goals in 19 appearances for the club, but his contract was cancelled less than a year later after suspicion of drunk driving.

==== Loan to New York Red Bulls ====
On 5 February 2021, Fábio Gomes joined the New York Red Bulls in MLS on loan through June with a purchase option. On 17 April 2021, Fábio made his debut for New York, appearing as a starter in a 2–1 loss to Sporting Kansas City. On 1 May 2021, Fábio was named man of the match as he helped New York to a 2–0 victory over Chicago Fire FC assisting on both goals. On 10 June 2021, the Red Bulls announced that Fábio's loan had been extended until the end of the 2021 season. On 18 June 2021, Fábio scored his first goal for the club in a 2–0 victory over Nashville SC On 3 July 2021, Fábio scored the winning goal in a 2–1 victory over Orlando City SC. On 30 October 2021, Fábio scored a game-winner during second-half stoppage time in a 1–0 victory over CF Montréal. A week later, on 7 November, Fábio scored New York's loan goal in a 1–1 draw with Nashville SC, helping the club qualify for the MLS playoffs.

=== Atlético Mineiro ===
On 7 January 2022, Fábio Gomes joined Atlético Mineiro on a four-year deal.

==== Loan to Vasco da Gama ====
On 29 July 2022, Fábio Gomes joined Vasco da Gama on loan for the remainder of the 2022 Série B season.

==== Loan to Paços de Ferreira ====
On 15 January 2023, Fábio Gomes joined Primeira Liga club Paços de Ferreira on loan for the remainder of the 2022–23 season.

==== Loan to Juventude ====
On 14 June 2023, Fábio Gomes agreed to a loan deal with Série B side Juventude for the remainder of the season.

==== Loan to Sydney FC ====
On September 13, 2023, it was announced that Fabio Gomes' loan with Juventude was to be severed, with the striker going out on loan to Australian club Sydney FC for the 23-24 A-League season.

Gomes scored two goals when Sydney FC defeated Brisbane Roar FC 3–1 to win the 2023 Australia Cup on 7 October. His first league goal came in a 5–1 win over Adelaide United in the third round, which also served as the club's first win of the season.

Despite being joint top scorer with Joe Lolley on 11 goals for the season, Fabio was released by Sydney FC at the conclusion of the league season.

==== Loan to Bolívar ====
On 29 July 2024, Gomes joined Club Bolívar on a one-year loan with an option to buy.

=== Mazatlán ===
On 21 July 2025, Gomes joined Liga MX club Mazatlán on a free transfer.

== Career statistics ==
As of 30 June 2025

Club	Season	League			State League (Note: Includes Campeonato Paulista, Campeonato Mineiro)		National cup (Note: Includes Copa do Brasil, Australia Cup, Copa Bolivia)		Continental		Other		Total	
Club	Season	Division	Apps	Goals	Apps	Goals	Apps	Goals	Apps	Goals	Apps	Goals	Apps	Goals
Audax	2017	Paulista	0	0	0	0	0	0	—		6 (Note: Appearances in Copa Paulista)	2	6	2
Oeste	2019	Série B	32	15	7	4	0	0	—		—		39	19
Oeste	2020	Série B	15	5	0	0	0	0	—		—		15	5
Oeste	Total		47	20	7	4	0	0	—		6	2	54	24
Albirex Niigata (loan)	2020	J2 League	19	5	—		0	0	—		—		19	5
New York Red Bulls (loan)	2021	MLS	30	7	—		0	0	—		1 (Note: Appearance in MLS Cup Playoffs)	0	31	7
Atlético Mineiro	2022	Série A	5	0	8	2	2	1	1 (Note: Appearance in Copa Libertadores)	0	0	0	16	3
Vasco da Gama (loan)	2022	Série B	9	1	—		—		—		—		9	1
Paços de Ferreira (loan)	2022–23	Primeira Liga	9	0	—		—		—		—		9	0
Juventude (loan)	2023	Série B	4	0	—		—		—		—		4	0
Sydney FC (loan)	2023–24	A-League Men	28	11	—		2	2	—		—		30	13
Bolívar (loan)	2024	Bolivian Primera División	20	12	—		—		2	0	—		22	12
Bolívar (loan)	2025	Bolivian Primera División	10	6	—		2	1	6	4	—		18	11
Bolívar (loan)	Total		30	18	—		2	1	8	4	—		40	23
Career total			181	62	15	6	6	4	9	4	7	2	218	78

== Honours ==
Atlético Mineiro

- Campeonato Mineiro: 2022

Sydney FC

- Australia Cup: 2023

Bolívar

- Bolivian Primera División: 2024
