= Harry Steele (soccer) =

Australian soccer player

Personal information
- Full name: Harrison James Steele
- Date of birth: 12 October 2002 (age 24)
- Place of birth: Gosford, New South Wales, Australia
- Height: 1.75 m (5 ft 9 in)
- Position: Defensive midfielder

Team information
- Current team: Central Coast Mariners
- Number: 16

Youth career
- Terrigal United FC
- Central Coast Mariners

Senior career*
Years	Team	Apps	(Gls)
2020–2022	CCM Academy	20	(3)
2021–	Central Coast Mariners	108	(4)
- * Club domestic league appearances and goals as of 3 May 2026

Harrison James Steele (born 12 October 2002) is an Australian professional footballer who plays as a defensive midfielder for Central Coast Mariners.

== Club career ==
=== Central Coast Mariners ===
A Central Coast local as a junior, having played his junior football for Terrigal United before coming though the CCM Academy, Steele made his A-League Men debut against Newcastle Jets on 21 November 2021. On 25 July 2022, Steele signed a contract with Central Coast Mariners until 2025.

Steele was part of the Mariners team that won the 2022-23 A-League Championship, coming off the bench in the 78th minute in the 2023 A-League Men Grand Final in which the Mariners won 6-1 against Melbourne City at Western Sydney Stadium.

The following season, Steele was part of the Mariners' Championship, Premiership and AFC Cup winning 2023-24 season.

In the 2024-25 season, Steele became a regular starter in midfield for the Mariners after the departures of midfield stalwarts, Josh Nisbet and Max Balard. On 18 February 2025, in an AFC Champions League Elite match against Kawasaki Frontale in Japan, Steele was given the captaincy duties in the absence of regular captain Trent Sainsbury and vice-captain Brian Kaltak, the first time captaining his boyhood club.

== Honours ==
Central Coast Mariners

- A-League Men Championship: 2022–23, 2023-24
- A-League Men Premiership: 2023-24
- AFC Cup: 2023-24
