= 2023 A-League Men finals series =

A-League Men finals series
- Season: 2022–23
- Dates: 5 May – 3 June 2023
- Champions: Central Coast Mariners
- Matches: 7
- Goals: 23 (3.29 per match)
- Top goalscorer: Jason Cummings (4 goals)
- Biggest home win: Melbourne City 4–0 Sydney FC (Semi-finals, 19 May 2023)
- Biggest away win: Western Sydney Wanderers 1–2 Sydney FC (Elimination-finals, 6 May 2023); Adelaide United 1–2 Central Coast Mariners (Semi-finals, 13 May 2023)
- Highest scoring: Melbourne City 1–6 Central Coast Mariners (Grand Final, 3 June 2023)
- Highest attendance: 27,288; Western Sydney Wanderers 1–2 Sydney FC (Elimination-finals, 6 May 2023)
- Lowest attendance: 9,223; Melbourne City 4–0 Sydney FC (Semi-finals, 19 May 2023)
- Total attendance: 124,417
- Average attendance: 17,774

The 2023 A-League Men finals series was the 18th annual edition of A-League finals series, the playoffs tournament staged to determine the champion of the 2022–23 A-League Men season. The series was played over four weeks culminating in the 2023 A-League Men Grand Final, where the Central Coast Mariners won their second championship 6–1 against premiers Melbourne City.

It featured the first A-League Men Grand Final played at a fixed location (outside the 2020 Grand Final), which was played at CommBank Stadium in Parramatta, based on an Australian Professional Leagues decision in December 2022 for the 2023, 2024 and 2025 A-Leagues Grand Finals to be played in Sydney in a deal with Destination NSW, which met fan backlash and soonly scrapped in October 2023.

== Qualification ==
Melbourne City was first to qualify for the 2023 finals series at Round 21, after a 1–1 draw with Macarthur FC and to claim the league premiership with two rounds left. Central Coast Mariners finished second as the other team heading directly into the semi-finals with Melbourne City. Elimination-finalists Adelaide United, Western Sydney Wanderers, Sydney FC and Wellington Phoenix were the other four qualifying for the finals series.

Pos	Team	Pld	W	D	L	GF	GA	GD	Pts	Qualification
1	Melbourne City	26	16	7	3	61	32	+29	55	Qualification for AFC Champions League group stage and Finals series (Note: Determined by which of the Premiers for the 2021–22 or 2022–23 seasons accrued the most combined points over both seasons.)
2	Central Coast Mariners (C)	26	13	5	8	55	35	+20	44	Qualification for AFC Cup group stage and Finals series
3	Adelaide United	26	11	9	6	53	46	+7	42	Qualification for Finals series (Note: The top two teams enter the finals series at the semi-finals, while the teams ranked third to sixth enter the finals series at the elimination-finals.)
4	Western Sydney Wanderers	26	11	8	7	43	27	+16	41	Qualification for Finals series
5	Sydney FC	26	11	5	10	40	39	+1	38	Qualification for Finals series
6	Wellington Phoenix (Note: Wellington Phoenix cannot qualify for Asian Football Confederation competitions as they are based in New Zealand, which is under the Oceania Football Confederation.)	26	9	8	9	39	45	−6	35	Qualification for Finals series
7	Western United	26	9	5	12	34	47	−13	32	
8	Brisbane Roar	26	7	9	10	26	33	−7	30	
9	Perth Glory	26	7	8	11	36	46	−10	29	Qualification for 2023 Australia Cup play-offs
10	Newcastle Jets	26	8	5	13	30	45	−15	29	Qualification for 2023 Australia Cup play-offs
11	Melbourne Victory	26	8	4	14	29	34	−5	28	Qualification for 2023 Australia Cup play-offs
12	Macarthur FC	26	7	5	14	31	48	−17	26	Qualification for AFC Cup group stage and 2023 Australia Cup play-offs (Note: Qualified to the AFC Cup as the 2022 Australia Cup winners.)

Source: A-Leagues
Rules for classification: 1) Points; 2) Goal difference; 3) Goals scored; 4) Points per game; 5) Least red cards; 6) Least yellow cards; 7) Toss of a coin in an event of a tie of two clubs.
(C) Champions

== Venues ==
Sydney		2023 A-League Men finals series is located in Australia	Melbourne
Allianz Stadium	CommBank Stadium	2023 A-League Men finals series is located in Australia	AAMI Park
Capacity: 42,500	Capacity: 30,000	2023 A-League Men finals series is located in Australia	Capacity: 30,050
Gosford		2023 A-League Men finals series is located in Australia	Adelaide
Industree Group Stadium		2023 A-League Men finals series is located in Australia	Coopers Stadium
Capacity: 20,059		2023 A-League Men finals series is located in Australia	Capacity: 16,500

== Bracket ==
The system used for the 2023 A-League Men finals series is the modified top-six play-offs by the A-Leagues. The top two teams enter the two-legged semi-finals receiving the bye for the elimination-finals in which the teams from third placed to sixth place enter the elimination-finals with "third against sixth" and "fourth against fifth". Losers for the elimination-finals are eliminated, and winners qualify for the two-legged semi-finals.

First placed team in the semi-finals plays the lowest ranked elimination-final winning team and secon placed team in the semi-finals plays the highest ranked elimination-final winner. Home-state advantage goes to the team with the higher ladder position, except for the Grand Final in this series.

Elimination-finals
4	Western Sydney Wanderers	1
5	Sydney FC	2
3	Adelaide United	2
6	Wellington Phoenix	0

Semi-finals
5	Sydney FC	1	0	1
1	Melbourne City	1	4	5
3	Adelaide United	1	0	1
2	Central Coast Mariners	2	2	4

Grand Final
1	Melbourne City	1
2	Central Coast Mariners	6

== Elimination-finals ==
=== Adelaide United vs Wellington Phoenix ===
The first elimination-finals match occurred between third-placed Adelaide United and sixth-placed Wellington Phoenix at Coopers Stadium. Adelaide won 2–0 thanks to a Craig Goodwin double into the two-legged semi-finals.

5 May 2023
19:15 ACST

Adelaide United	2–0	Wellington Phoenix
Goodwin 19', 67' (pen.)	Report

Coopers Stadium, Adelaide
Attendance: 10,231
Referee: Alireza Faghani

Adelaide; United	Wellington; Phoenix

GK	46	(Australia) Joe Gauci
RB	21	(Spain) Javi López
CB	4	(Australia) Nick Ansell		(substituted off) 86'
CB	3	(Australia) Ben Warland
LB	7	(Australia) Ryan Kitto	(yellow card) 34'
DM	8	(Spain) Isaías
DM	18	(Australia) Jay Barnett		(substituted off) 63'
RM	26	(Australia) Ben Halloran	(yellow card) 85'	(substituted off) 86'
CM	6	(Australia) Louis D'Arrigo
LM	11	(Australia) Craig Goodwin
CF	14	(Australia) George Blackwood		(substituted off) 64'
Substitutes:
FW	66	(Australia) Nestory Irankunda		(substituted on) 63'
FW	9	(Japan) Hiroshi Ibusuki		(substituted on) 64'
MF	55	(Australia) Ethan Alagich	(yellow card) 90+1'	(substituted on) 86'
DF	13	(Australia) Lachlan Barr		(substituted on) 86'
GK	1	(Australia) James Delianov
FW	35	(Australia) Luka Jovanovic
FW	36	(Australia) Panashe Madanha
Manager:
(Australia) Carl Veart

GK	20	(New Zealand) Oliver Sail
RB	17	(New Zealand) Callan Elliot
CB	4	(England) Scott Wootton
CB	6	(New Zealand) Tim Payne
LB	12	(Australia) Lucas Mauragis
DM	14	(New Zealand) Alex Rufer		(substituted off) 68'
DM	5	(Australia) Steven Ugarkovic		(substituted off) 86'
RM	31	(Brazil) Yan Sasse	(yellow card) 80'
LM	7	(New Zealand) Kosta Barbarouses		(substituted off) 46'
RF	9	(Poland) Oskar Zawada
LF	10	(England) David Ball
Substitutes:
MF	11	(Bulgaria) Bozhidar Kraev	(yellow card) 83'	(substituted on) 46'
MF	23	(New Zealand) Clayton Lewis		(substituted on) 68'
FW	24	(New Zealand) Oskar van Hattum		(substituted on) 86'
DF	21	(Australia) Joshua Laws
GK	40	(New Zealand) Alex Paulsen
MF	13	(Australia) Nicholas Pennington
DF	3	(New Zealand) Finn Surman
Manager:
(Australia) Ufuk Talay

Assistant referees:
Greg Taylor
Brad Wright
Fourth official:
Daniel Elder
Video assistant referee:
Kris Griffiths-Jones
Assistant video assistant referees:
Alex King
Kearney Robinson

=== Western Sydney Wanderers vs Sydney FC ===
The second elimination-finals match occurred between fourth-placed Western Sydney Wanderers and fifth-placed Sydney FC at Bankwest Stadium; the first time a Sydney Derby was played in the finals series of the A-League Men. Despite Wanderers scoring first through a Morgan Schneiderlin penalty, Sydney made the comeback 2–1 over Western Sydney sent them to the two-legged semi-finals via Róbert Mak and Adam Le Fondre.

6 May 2023
19:45 AEST

Western Sydney Wanderers	1–2	Sydney FC
Schneiderlin 39' (pen.)	Report	Mak 69'; Le Fondre 80'

CommBank Stadium, Sydney
Attendance: 27,288
Referee: Chris Beath

Western Sydney; Wanderers	Sydney

GK	20	(Australia) Lawrence Thomas
RB	31	(Australia) Aidan Simmons
CB	5	(Australia) Tomislav Mrčela		(substituted off) 61'
CB	6	(Brazil) Marcelo
LB	3	(Ivory Coast) Adama Traoré		(substituted off) 82'
RM	28	(Australia) Calem Nieuwenhof
CM	4	(France) Morgan Schneiderlin
LM	17	(France) Romain Amalfitano		(substituted off) 82'
AM	10	(Serbia) Miloš Ninković	(yellow card) 68'	(substituted off) 76'
RF	11	(Tunisia) Amor Layouni		(substituted off) 82'
LF	26	(Australia) Brandon Borrello	(yellow card) 66'
Substitutes:
MF	16	(Australia) Tom Beadling		(substituted on) 61'
FW	14	(Australia) Nicolas Milanovic		(substituted on) 76'
FW	23	(Democratic Republic of the Congo) Yeni N'Gbakoto		(substituted on) 82'
DF	19	(Australia) Daniel Wilmering		(substituted on) 82'
FW	9	(Australia) Kusini Yengi		(substituted on) 82'
MF	8	(Australia) Oliver Bozanic
GK	1	(Australia) Daniel Margush
Manager:
(Australia) Marko Rudan

GK	1	(Australia) Andrew Redmayne
RB	23	(Australia) Rhyan Grant	(yellow card) 65'
CB	6	(England) Jack Rodwell
CB	4	(Australia) Alex Wilkinson
LB	3	(Australia) Joel King
RM	17	(Australia) Anthony Caceres
CM	26	(Australia) Luke Brattan	(yellow card) 66'
CM	8	(Australia) Paulo Retre		(substituted off) 78'
LM	11	(Slovakia) Róbert Mak	(yellow card) 39'	(substituted off) 86'
RF	22	(Australia) Max Burgess		(substituted off) 89'
LF	9	(England) Adam Le Fondre
Substitutes:
FW	10	(England) Joe Lolley		(substituted on) 78'	(substituted off) 89'
MF	28	(Australia) Jake Girdwood-Reich		(substituted on) 86'
DF	2	(Australia) James Donachie		(substituted on) 89'
FW	19	(Australia) Adrian Segecic		(substituted on) 89'
DF	18	(Spain) Diego Caballo
GK	20	(Australia) Tom Heward-Belle
FW	12	(Australia) Patrick Wood
Manager:
(Australia) Steve Corica

Assistant referees:
Anton Shchetinin
Ashley Beecham
Fourth official:
Jack Morgan
Video assistant referee:
Alex King
Assistant video assistant referees:
Kris Griffiths-Jones
Kearney Robinson

== Semi-finals ==
Team 1	Agg.	Team 2	1st leg	2nd leg
Melbourne City	5–1	Sydney FC	1–1	4–0
Central Coast Mariners	4–1	Adelaide United	2–1	2–0

=== Sydney FC vs Melbourne City ===
Sydney FC qualified for the two-legged semi-finals against Melbourne City starting off at home at Allianz Stadium which finished as a 1–1 draw with Mathew Leckie scoring first for City and Adam Le Fondre equalizing in a second-half penalty. The following week at AAMI Park, saw City breeze 4–0 with goals by Curtis Good, Marco Tilio, Richard van der Venne and an own goal winning 5–1 on aggregate heading to the Grand Final.

12 May 2023
19:45 AEST

Sydney FC	1–1	Melbourne City
Le Fondre 64' (pen.)	Report	Leckie 18'

Allianz Stadium, Sydney
Attendance: 15,322
Referee: Adam Kersey

Sydney	Melbourne City

GK	1	(Australia) Andrew Redmayne
RB	23	(Australia) Rhyan Grant	(yellow card) 77'
CB	6	(England) Jack Rodwell
CB	4	(Australia) Alex Wilkinson
LB	3	(Australia) Joel King	(yellow card) 70'
DM	26	(Australia) Luke Brattan
DM	8	(Australia) Paulo Retre		(substituted off) 84'
RM	17	(Australia) Anthony Caceres
CM	22	(Australia) Max Burgess		(substituted off) 90+2'
LM	11	(Slovakia) Róbert Mak		(substituted off) 54'
CF	9	(England) Adam Le Fondre		(substituted off) 84'
Substitutes:
FW	10	(England) Joe Lolley		(substituted on) 54'
MF	28	(Australia) Jake Girdwood-Reich		(substituted on) 84'
FW	12	(Australia) Patrick Wood		(substituted on) 84'
DF	18	(Spain) Diego Caballo		(substituted on) 90+2'
DF	2	(Australia) James Donachie
GK	20	(Australia) Tom Heward-Belle
FW	19	(Australia) Adrian Segecic
Manager:
(Australia) Steve Corica			(yellow card) 90+6'

GK	1	(Australia) Tom Glover
RB	25	(Australia) Callum Talbot		(substituted off) 84'
CB	4	(Portugal) Nuno Reis
CB	22	(Australia) Curtis Good	(yellow card) 88'
LB	38	(Australia) Jordan Bos
DM	14	(Kosovo) Valon Berisha
DM	10	(France) Florin Berenguer		(substituted off) 84'
RM	23	(Australia) Marco Tilio
CM	8	(Netherlands) Richard van der Venne		(substituted off) 76'
LM	7	(Australia) Mathew Leckie
CF	9	(Australia) Jamie Maclaren
Substitutes:
FW	15	(Australia) Andrew Nabbout		(substituted on) 76'
DF	3	(Australia) Scott Jamieson		(substituted on) 84'
DF	6	(Finland) Thomas Lam		(substituted on) 84'
FW	35	(Australia) Raphael Borges Rodrigues
FW	37	(Australia) Max Caputo
DF	2	(Australia) Scott Galloway
GK	33	(Australia) Matt Sutton
Manager:
(Australia) Rado Vidošić

Assistant referees:
Greg Taylor
Isaac Trevis
Fourth official:
Jonathan Barreiro
Video assistant referee:
Shaun Evans
Assistant video assistant referees:
Chris Beath
Sarah Ho

=== Melbourne City vs Sydney FC ===
Melbourne City won 5–1 on aggregate.

19 May 2023
19:45 AEST

Melbourne City	4–0	Sydney FC
Good 37'; Rodwell 59' (o.g.); Tilio 67'; Van der Venne 82'	Report

AAMI Park, Melbourne
Attendance: 9,223
Referee: Shaun Evans

Melbourne City	Sydney

GK	1	(Australia) Tom Glover
RB	4	(Portugal) Nuno Reis
CB	6	(Finland) Thomas Lam	(yellow card) 45+2'
CB	22	(Australia) Curtis Good		(substituted off) 74'
LB	38	(Australia) Jordan Bos		(substituted off) 83'
DM	13	(Australia) Aiden O'Neill		(substituted off) 73'
RM	15	(Australia) Andrew Nabbout
CM	14	(Kosovo) Valon Berisha		(substituted off) 74'
CM	7	(Australia) Mathew Leckie		(substituted off) 83'
LM	23	(Australia) Marco Tilio
CF	9	(Australia) Jamie Maclaren
Substitutes:
MF	8	(Netherlands) Richard van der Venne		(substituted on) 73'
DF	3	(Australia) Scott Jamieson		(substituted on) 74'
DF	25	(Australia) Callum Talbot		(substituted on) 74'
MF	10	(France) Florin Berenguer		(substituted on) 83'
DF	2	(Australia) Scott Galloway		(substituted on) 83'
FW	37	(Australia) Max Caputo
GK	33	(Australia) Matt Sutton
Manager:
(Australia) Rado Vidošić

GK	1	(Australia) Andrew Redmayne
RB	23	(Australia) Rhyan Grant
CB	4	(Australia) Alex Wilkinson
CB	6	(England) Jack Rodwell
LB	3	(Australia) Joel King	(yellow card) 28'
DM	26	(Australia) Luke Brattan	(yellow card) 43'
DM	8	(Australia) Paulo Retre		(substituted off) 67'
RM	17	(Australia) Anthony Caceres
CM	22	(Australia) Max Burgess	(red card) 20'
LM	19	(Australia) Adrian Segecic		(substituted off) 67'
CF	9	(England) Adam Le Fondre		(substituted off) 83'
Substitutes:
MF	28	(Australia) Jake Girdwood-Reich		(substituted on) 67'
FW	10	(England) Joe Lolley		(substituted on) 67'
FW	12	(Australia) Patrick Wood		(substituted on) 83'
DF	18	(Spain) Diego Caballo
DF	2	(Australia) James Donachie
GK	20	(Australia) Tom Heward-Belle
FW	25	(Australia) Jaiden Kucharski
Manager:
(Australia) Steve Corica

Assistant referees:
George Lakrindis
Owen Goldrick
Fourth official:
Daniel Elder
Video assistant referee:
Kris Griffiths-Jones
Assistant video assistant referees:
Kate Jacewicz
Richard Naumovski

=== Adelaide United vs Central Coast Mariners ===
Adelaide United qualified for the two-legged semi-finals against Central Coast Mariners starting off at back home at Coopers Stadium which despite Adelaide scoring first, had Central Coast comeback 2–1. The following week at Industree Group Stadium fully attended, Central Coast extended their advantage by winning 2–0 thanks to goals by Samuel Silvera and Marco Túlio; winning 4–1 on aggregate to qualify for the Grand Final against Melbourne City.

13 May 2023
19:45 ACST

Adelaide United	1–2	Central Coast Mariners
Goodwin 4' (pen.)	Report	McGarry 15'; Cummings 38'

Coopers Stadium, Adelaide
Attendance: 15,771
Referee: Alex King

Adelaide; United	Central Coast; Mariners

GK	46	(Australia) Joe Gauci
RB	21	(Spain) Javi López
CB	4	(Australia) Nick Ansell
CB	3	(Australia) Ben Warland
LB	7	(Australia) Ryan Kitto	(yellow card) 79'
DM	8	(Spain) Isaías	(yellow card) 65'
RM	26	(Australia) Ben Halloran		(substituted off) 84'
CM	10	(England) Zach Clough		(substituted off) 69'
CM	6	(Australia) Louis D'Arrigo
LM	11	(Australia) Craig Goodwin
CF	9	(Japan) Hiroshi Ibusuki		(substituted off) 54'
Substitutes:
FW	66	(Australia) Nestory Irankunda	(yellow card) 82'	(substituted on) 54'
FW	14	(Australia) George Blackwood		(substituted on) 69'
FW	36	(Australia) Panashe Madanha		(substituted on) 84'
MF	55	(Australia) Ethan Alagich
DF	13	(Australia) Lachlan Barr
GK	1	(Australia) James Delianov
DF	41	(Australia) Alexandar Popovic
Manager:
(Australia) Carl Veart

GK	20	(Australia) Danny Vukovic
RB	15	(New Zealand) Storm Roux
CB	25	(Australia) Nectarios Triantis	(yellow card) 53'
CB	3	(Vanuatu) Brian Kaltak
LB	5	(Australia) James McGarry		(substituted off) 55'
RM	7	(Australia) Samuel Silvera		(substituted off) 88'
CM	6	(Australia) Max Balard
CM	4	(Australia) Josh Nisbet		(substituted off) 77'
LM	11	(France) Béni Nkololo
RF	9	(Australia) Jason Cummings		(substituted off) 88'
LF	98	(Brazil) Marco Túlio		(substituted off) 77'
Substitutes:
DF	18	(Australia) Jacob Farrell	(yellow card) 62'	(substituted on) 55'
MF	10	(Brazil) Moresche		(substituted on) 77'
MF	13	(Australia) Harry Steele		(substituted on) 77'
DF	23	(Fiji) Dan Hall		(substituted on) 88'
FW	31	(Australia) Christian Theoharous	(yellow card) 90+5'	(substituted on) 88'
GK	24	(Australia) Yaren Sözer
FW	14	(Australia) Dylan Wenzel-Halls
Manager:
(Scotland) Nick Montgomery

Assistant referees:
Kearney Robinson
Daniel Ilievski
Fourth official:
Jack Morgan
Video assistant referee:
Chris Beath
Assistant video assistant referees:
Shaun Evans
Sarah Ho

=== Central Coast Mariners vs Adelaide United ===
Central Coast Mariners won 4–1 on aggregate.

20 May 2023
19:45 AEST

Central Coast Mariners	2–0	Adelaide United
Silvera 48'; Túlio 52'	Report

Industree Group Stadium, Gosford
Attendance: 20,059
Referee: Alireza Faghani

Central Coast; Mariners	Adelaide; United

GK	20	(Australia) Danny Vukovic
RB	15	(New Zealand) Storm Roux		(substituted off) 82'
CB	25	(Australia) Nectarios Triantis	(yellow card) 65'
CB	3	(Vanuatu) Brian Kaltak
LB	5	(Australia) James McGarry		(substituted off) 62'
RM	11	(France) Béni Nkololo	(yellow card) 62'	(substituted off) 62'
CM	4	(Australia) Josh Nisbet
CM	6	(Australia) Max Balard		(substituted off) 81'
LM	7	(Australia) Samuel Silvera
RF	98	(Brazil) Marco Túlio		(substituted off) 87'
LF	9	(Australia) Jason Cummings
Substitutes:
DF	18	(Australia) Jacob Farrell		(substituted on) 62'
FW	31	(Australia) Christian Theoharous		(substituted on) 62'
MF	13	(Australia) Harry Steele		(substituted on) 81'
DF	23	(Fiji) Dan Hall		(substituted on) 82'
MF	10	(Brazil) Moresche		(substituted on) 87'
GK	24	(Australia) Yaren Sözer
FW	14	(Australia) Dylan Wenzel-Halls
Manager:
(Scotland) Nick Montgomery

GK	46	(Australia) Joe Gauci
RB	21	(Spain) Javi López		(substituted off) 81'
CB	41	(Australia) Alexandar Popovic	(yellow card) 37'
CB	3	(Australia) Ben Warland
LB	7	(Australia) Ryan Kitto
DM	6	(Australia) Louis D'Arrigo		(substituted off) 62'
DM	8	(Spain) Isaías
RM	10	(England) Zach Clough		(substituted off) 81'
CM	55	(Australia) Ethan Alagich		(substituted off) 75'
LM	11	(Australia) Craig Goodwin
CF	26	(Australia) Ben Halloran
Substitutes:
FW	66	(Australia) Nestory Irankunda		(substituted on) 62'
FW	14	(Australia) George Blackwood		(substituted on) 75'
MF	23	(Australia) Luke Duzel		(substituted on) 81'
FW	36	(Australia) Panashe Madanha		(substituted on) 81'
DF	13	(Australia) Lachlan Barr
GK	1	(Australia) James Delianov
FW	35	(Australia) Luka Jovanovic
Manager:
(Australia) Carl Veart

Assistant referees:
David Walsh
Brad Wright
Fourth official:
Jonathan Barreiro
Video assistant referee:
Kate Jacewicz
Assistant video assistant referees:
Kris Griffiths-Jones
Richard Naumovski

== Grand Final ==
The Grand Final featured Melbourne City in their fourth consecutive Grand Final, against the Central Coast Mariners appearing in their first Grand Final in a decade and fifth overall. Central Coast scored the first and second goals through Jason Cummings and Samuel Silvera, with City getting one back by substitute Richard van der Venne, with Mariners leading 2–1 at half time. Since, they scored through two penalties by Cummings completing his hat-trick and further goals by Béni Nkololo and Moresche in stoppage time. Central Coast Mariners became champions of the A-League Men after defeating Melbourne City 6–1 in the Grand Final.

3 June 2023
19:45 AEST

Melbourne City	1–6	Central Coast Mariners
Van der Venne 40'	Report	Cummings 20', 65' (pen.), 73' (pen.); Silvera 34'; Nkololo 83'; Moresche 90+1'

CommBank Stadium, Sydney
Attendance: 26,523
Referee: Chris Beath

Melbourne; City	Central Coast; Mariners

GK	1	(Australia) Tom Glover
RB	4	(Portugal) Nuno Reis	(yellow card) 45'	(substituted off) 69'
CB	6	(Finland) Thomas Lam
CB	22	(Australia) Curtis Good
LB	38	(Australia) Jordan Bos		(substituted off) 88'
DM	13	(Australia) Aiden O'Neill
RM	23	(Australia) Marco Tilio	(yellow card) 79'
LM	14	(Kosovo) Valon Berisha		(substituted off) 22'
AM	9	(Australia) Jamie Maclaren (c)
CF	15	(Australia) Andrew Nabbout		(substituted off) 88'
CF	7	(Australia) Mathew Leckie
Substitutes:
GK	33	(Australia) Matt Sutton
DF	2	(Australia) Scott Galloway		(substituted on) 88'
DF	3	(Australia) Scott Jamieson
DF	25	(Australia) Callum Talbot		(substituted on) 69'
MF	8	(Netherlands) Richard van der Venne		(substituted on) 22'
MF	10	(France) Florin Berenguer		(substituted on) 88'
FW	37	(Australia) Max Caputo
Manager:
(Australia) Rado Vidosic

GK	20	(Australia) Danny Vukovic (c)
CB	15	(New Zealand) Storm Roux		(substituted off) 78'
CB	3	(Vanuatu) Brian Kaltak
CB	5	(New Zealand) James McGarry		(substituted off) 63'
DM	6	(Australia) Max Balard		(substituted off) 78'
RM	11	(France) Béni Nkololo
CM	25	(Australia) Nectarios Triantis	(yellow card) 51'	(substituted off) 85'
CM	4	(Australia) Josh Nisbet
LM	7	(Australia) Samuel Silvera		(substituted off) 85'
CF	98	(Brazil) Marco Túlio	(yellow card) 89'
CF	9	(Australia) Jason Cummings
Substitutes:
GK	24	(Australia) Yaren Sözer
DF	18	(Australia) Jacob Farrell		(substituted on) 63'
DF	23	(Fiji) Dan Hall		(substituted on) 78'
MF	13	(Australia) Harry Steele		(substituted on) 78'
FW	10	(Brazil) Moresche	(yellow card) 90+2'	(substituted on) 85'
FW	14	(Australia) Dylan Wenzel-Halls
FW	31	(Australia) Christian Theoharous		(substituted on) 85'
Manager:
(Scotland) Nick Montgomery

Man of the Match (Joe Marston Medal):
Jason Cummings

Assistant referees:
Anton Shchetinin
Ashley Beecham
Fourth official:
Adam Kersey
Fifth official:
Brad Wright
Video assistant referee:
Kate Jacewicz
Assistant video assistant referees:
Shaun Evans
Kearney Robinson

Match rules

- 90 minutes.
- 30 minutes of extra time if necessary.
- Penalty shoot-out if scores still level.
- Seven named substitutes.
- Maximum of five substitutions, with a sixth allowed in extra time. (Note: Each team was given only three opportunities to make substitutions, with a fourth opportunity in extra time, excluding substitutions made at half-time, before the start of extra time and at half-time in extra time.)
