= 2022–23 Sydney FC season =

Sydney FC 2022-23 Season

Sydney FC
2022–23 season
- Chairman: Scott Barlow
- Manager: Steve Corica
- Stadium: Allianz Stadium
- A-League Men: 5th
- A-League Men Finals: Semi-finals
- Australia Cup: Quarter-finals
- Top goalscorer: League: Adam Le Fondre (12); All: Adam Le Fondre (13)
- Highest home attendance: 34,232 vs. Western Sydney Wanderers (12 November 2022); A-League Men
- Lowest home attendance: 3,211 vs. Central Coast Mariners (31 July 2022); Australia Cup
- Average home league attendance: 17,008
- Biggest win: 4–1 vs. Perth Glory (H) (16 April 2023); A-League Men
- Biggest defeat: 0–4 vs. Western Sydney Wanderers (H) (18 March 2023); A-League Men vs. Melbourne City (A) (19 May 2023); A-League Men Finals
Home colours	Away colours	Third colours

The 2022–23 season was the 18th in the history of Sydney Football Club. In addition to the domestic league, Sydney FC competed in the Australia Cup for the eighth time.

For the first time since the 2017–18 season, Sydney FC returned to Allianz Stadium.

== Players ==
=== First-team squad ===
Note: Flags indicate national team as defined under FIFA eligibility rules; some limited exceptions apply. Players may hold more than one non-FIFA nationality.

No.	Pos.	Nation	Player
1	GK	AUS	Andrew Redmayne
2	DF	AUS	James Donachie
3	DF	AUS	Joel King (on loan from OB)
4	DF	AUS	Alex Wilkinson (captain)
6	DF	ENG	Jack Rodwell
8	MF	AUS	Paulo Retre
9	FW	ENG	Adam Le Fondre
10	FW	ENG	Joe Lolley
11	FW	SVK	Róbert Mak
12	FW	AUS	Patrick Wood
17	MF	AUS	Anthony Caceres
18	DF	ESP	Diego Caballo

No.	Pos.	Nation	Player
19	FW	AUS	Adrian Segecic
20	GK	AUS	Tom Heward-Belle
21	FW	AUS	Alex Parsons
22	MF	AUS	Max Burgess
23	DF	AUS	Rhyan Grant
24	MF	AUS	Corey Hollman (scholarship)
25	FW	AUS	Jaiden Kucharski (scholarship)
26	MF	AUS	Luke Brattan (vice-captain)
28	MF	AUS	Jake Girdwood-Reich (scholarship)
29	DF	AUS	Aaron Gurd (scholarship)
30	GK	AUS	Adam Pavlesic

== Transfers ==
=== Transfers in ===
No.	Position	Player	Transferred from	Type/fee	Contract length	Date	Ref.
29	DF	Anton Mlinaric	Brisbane Roar	End of loan		19 May 2022	
18	DF	(Spain) Diego Caballo	Unattached	Free transfer	2 years	13 July 2022	
11	MF	(Slovakia) Róbert Mak	Unattached	Free transfer	2 years	9 August 2022	
21	FW	Alex Parsons	Unattached	Free transfer	2 years	10 August 2022	
6	DF	(England) Jack Rodwell	Unattached	Free transfer	2 years	12 August 2022	
10	MF	(England) Joe Lolley	(England) Nottingham Forest	Undisclosed	2 years	15 August 2022	
27	DF	Adrian Vlastelica	(Australia) Sydney United 58	Injury replacement for Alex Wilkinson	3 months	15 August 2022	
3	DF	Joel King	(Denmark) OB	Loan	6 months	1 February 2023	

==== From youth squad ====
N	Pos.	Nat.	Name	Age	Notes
29	DF	(Australia)	Aaron Gurd	20	1-year scholarship contract
25	FW	(Australia)	Jaiden Kucharski	19	2-year scholarship contract
24	MF	(Australia)	Corey Hollman	18	2-year scholarship contract
28	MF	(Australia)	Jake Girdwood-Reich	17	2-year scholarship contract

=== Transfers out ===
No.	Position	Player	Transferred to	Type/fee	Date	Ref.
9	FW	(Brazil) Bobô	Retired		2 May 2022	
7	DF	Michael Zullo	Unattached	End of contract	16 May 2022	
11	FW	(New Zealand) Kosta Barbarouses	Unattached	End of contract	19 May 2022	
16	FW	(Netherlands) Luciano Narsingh	Unattached	End of contract	19 May 2022	
12	FW	Trent Buhagiar	Unattached	End of contract	19 May 2022	
6	MF	Mustafa Amini	Unattached	End of contract	19 May 2022	
21	DF	Harry Van Der Saag	Unattached	End of contract	19 May 2022	
25	DF	Callum Talbot	Unattached	End of contract	19 May 2022	
29	DF	Anton Mlinaric	Unattached	End of contract	19 May 2022	
35	DF	Liam McGing	Unattached	End of contract	19 May 2022	
19	MF	Chris Zuvela	Unattached	End of contract	19 May 2022	
28	MF	Calem Nieuwenhof	Unattached	End of contract	19 May 2022	
10	MF	(Serbia) Miloš Ninković	Unattached	End of contract	21 June 2022	
3	DF	Ben Warland	Adelaide United	Mutual contract termination	24 June 2022	
27	FW	(Burundi) Elvis Kamsoba	(Iran) Sepahan	Undisclosed	23 July 2022	
27	DF	Adrian Vlastelica	(New South Wales) Sydney United 58	End of contract	2 February 2023	
16	MF	Patrick Yazbek	(Norway) Viking FK	Undisclosed	18 February 2023	
5	DF	Connor O'Toole	Western United	Mutual contract termination	6 February 2023	

=== Contract extensions ===
No.	Position	Name	Duration	Date	Note
19	MF	Adrian Segecic	3 years	9 May 2022	
26	MF	Luke Brattan	2 years	20 May 2022	
1	GK	Andrew Redmayne	3 years	30 May 2022	
30	GK	Adam Pavlesic	2 years	2 June 2022	
12	FW	Patrick Wood	1 year	20 June 2022	
4	DF	Alex Wilkinson	1 year	22 June 2022	
23	DF	Rhyan Grant	2 years	27 June 2022	
2	DF	James Donachie	2 years	4 July 2022	
8	MF	Paulo Retre	2 years	4 July 2022	
29	DF	Aaron Gurd	2 years	9 February 2023	Signed a full-time professional contract from 2023–24 until end of 2024–25.
22	MF	Max Burgess	2 years	21 February 2023	Contract extended from end of 2022–23 until end of 2024–25.

== Pre-season and friendlies ==
Win Draw Loss Fixtures

19 July 2022	Sydney FC	6–0	(New South Wales) Manly United	Sydney
	Donachie 18'; Le Fondre 24'; Burgess 30', 60'; Kucharski 46'; Caceres 57'	Report		Stadium: Sydney Football Stadium; Attendance: 0 (behind closed doors)
Note: The match was played over 60 minutes

15 September 2022	Sydney FC	2–1	Central Coast Mariners	Sydney
	Le Fondre; Parsons	Report	Duncan
Note: Match was played over three 45 minute periods

1 October 2022	Sydney FC	3–0	Wellington Phoenix	Sydney
	Caceres 69', 81'; Burgess 86'	Report

17 November 2022 Sydney Super Cup	Sydney FC	2–1	(Scotland) Celtic	Sydney
19:45 AEDT	Mak 26'; Burgess 60'	Report	Furuhashi 24'	Stadium: Sydney Football Stadium; Referee: Alex King

== Competitions ==
=== Overall record ===
Competition	First match	Last match	Starting round	Final position	Record							
Competition	First match	Last match	Starting round	Final position	Pld	W	D	L	GF	GA	GD	Win %
A-League Men	8 October 2022	29 April 2023	Matchday 1	5th	26	11	5	10	40	39	+1	42.31
A-League Men Finals	6 May 2023	19 May 2023	Elimination-finals	Semi-finals	3	1	1	1	3	6	−3	33.33
Australia Cup	31 July 2022	31 August 2022	Round of 32	Quarter-finals	3	1	1	1	6	6	+0	33.33
Total					32	13	7	12	49	51	−2	40.63

Last updated: 19 May 2023
Source: Soccerway

=== A-League Men ===
==== League table ====
Pos	Team	Pld	W	D	L	GF	GA	GD	Pts	Qualification
3	Adelaide United	26	11	9	6	53	46	+7	42	Qualification for Finals series (Note: The top two teams enter the finals series at the semi-finals, while the teams ranked third to sixth enter the finals series at the elimination-finals.)
4	Western Sydney Wanderers	26	11	8	7	43	27	+16	41	Qualification for Finals series
5	Sydney FC	26	11	5	10	40	39	+1	38	Qualification for Finals series
6	Wellington Phoenix (Note: Wellington Phoenix cannot qualify for Asian Football Confederation competitions as they are based in New Zealand, which is under the Oceania Football Confederation.)	26	9	8	9	39	45	−6	35	Qualification for Finals series
7	Western United	26	9	5	12	34	47	−13	32	

Source: A-Leagues
Rules for classification: 1) Points; 2) Goal difference; 3) Goals scored; 4) Points per game; 5) Least red cards; 6) Least yellow cards; 7) Toss of a coin in an event of a tie of two clubs.

==== Results summary ====
Overall								Home						Away					
Pld	W	D	L	GF	GA	GD	Pts	W	D	L	GF	GA	GD	W	D	L	GF	GA	GD
26	11	5	10	40	39	+1	38	5	3	5	20	22	−2	6	2	5	20	17	+3

Last updated: 29 April 2023.
Source: Ultimate A-League

==== Results by round ====
Round	1	2	3	4	5	6	7	8	9	10	11	12	13	14	15	16	17	18	19	20	21	22	23	24	25	26
Ground	H	A	H	A	A	H	H	A	H	A	H	A	A	A	H	A	H	A	H	A	H	H	A	H	A	H
Result	L	W	D	W	L	L	W	L	L	W	L	D	L	W	W	W	D	L	W	L	L	D	D	W	W	W
Position	9	5	6	4	6	6	5	9	10	6	8	8	10	8	6	5	6	6	6	6	6	6	6	6	5	5
Points	0	3	4	7	7	7	10	10	10	13	13	14	14	17	20	23	24	24	27	27	27	28	29	32	35	38

Updated to match(es) played on 24 April 2023. Source: Ultimate A-League
A = Away; H = Home; W = Win; D = Draw; L = Loss

==== Matches ====
8 October 2022 1	Sydney FC	2–3	Melbourne Victory	Sydney
19:45 AEDT	Mak 15'; Donachie 79'	Report	D'Agostino 31'; Ikonomidis 67'; Brillante 83'	Stadium: Allianz Stadium; Attendance: 21,840; Referee: Chris Beath

16 October 2022 2	Western United	1–3	Sydney FC	Melbourne
17:00 AEDT	Risdon 16'	Report	Le Fondre 39' (pen.); Mak 41'; Lolley 69'	Stadium: AAMI Park; Attendance: 3,427; Referee: Alireza Faghani

23 October 2022 3	Sydney FC	2–2	Adelaide United	Sydney
19:45 AEDT	Lolley 48'; Wood 52'	Report	Kitto 13'; Ibusuki (red card) 40'; Van der Saag 58'	Stadium: Allianz Stadium; Attendance: 16,623; Referee: Daniel Elder

29 October 2022 4	Macarthur FC	2–3	Sydney FC	Campbelltown
19:45 AEDT	Millar 16'; Aspropotamitis (red card) 37'; Carter 87'	Report	Wood 14'; Mak 45+1'; Segecic 83'	Stadium: Campbelltown Stadium; Attendance: 7,021; Referee: Alex King

6 November 2022 5	Brisbane Roar	3–1	Sydney FC	Brisbane
16:00 AEST	Austin 6'; Armiento 12'; Brindell-South 72'	Report	Caceres 40'; Retre (red card) 81'	Stadium: Moreton Daily Stadium; Attendance: 5,068; Referee: Jonathon Barreiro

12 November 2022 6	Sydney FC	0–1	Western Sydney Wanderers	Sydney
19:45 AEDT		Report	Yengi 70'	Stadium: Allianz Stadium; Attendance: 34,232; Referee: Alex King

Mid-season break for 2022 FIFA World Cup

10 December 2022 7	Sydney FC	2–1	Melbourne City	Sydney
19:45 AEDT	Lolley 23'; Le Fondre 61'	Report	Maclaren 22' (pen.)	Stadium: Allianz Stadium; Attendance: 14,946; Referee: Adam Kersey

17 December 2022 8	Central Coast Mariners	2–1	Sydney FC	Gosford
17:00 AEDT	Tulio 36'; Hall 39'	Report	Retre 11'	Stadium: Industree Group Stadium; Attendance: 6,579; Referee: Jack Morgan

24 December 2022 9	Sydney FC	0–3	Macarthur FC	Sydney
17:00 AEDT	Lolley (red card) 56'	Report	Arabuli 45+1', 89'; Davila 71'	Stadium: Allianz Stadium; Attendance: 9,714; Referee: Kurt Ams

1 January 2023 10	Newcastle Jets	0–2	Sydney FC	Newcastle
15:00 AEDT		Report	Le Fondre 37'; Mak 41'	Stadium: McDonald Jones Stadium; Attendance: 8,041; Referee: Alireza Faghani

7 January 2023 11	Sydney FC	0–1	Wellington Phoenix	Sydney
17:00 AEDT		Report	Zawada 10'; Kraev (yellow card) 34' (yellow-red card) 71'; Pennington (red card) 86'	Stadium: Allianz Stadium; Attendance: 13,921; Referee: Shaun Evans

14 January 2023 12	Perth Glory	2–2	Sydney FC	Perth
19:30 AWST	Duncan 46'; D. Williams 90+12'	Report	Lolley 6'; Grant 26'	Stadium: Macedonia Park; Attendance: 3,912; Referee: Alex King

21 January 2023 13	Western United	1–0	Sydney FC	Hobart
17:00 AEDT	Diamanti 86'			Stadium: North Hobart Oval; Attendance: 5,127; Referee: Alex King

26 January 2023 14	Melbourne Victory	1–2	Sydney FC	Melbourne
18:45 AEDT	Brimmer 26'	Report	Burgess 32'; Le Fondre 52'	Stadium: AAMI Park; Attendance: 8,181; Referee: Alireza Faghani

4 February 2023 15	Sydney FC	3–2	Central Coast Mariners	Sydney
17:00 AEDT	Le Fondre 10', 72'; Grant (red card) 19'; Lolley 58'	Report	Cummings 20' (pen.), 33'; Kaltak (red card) 25'	Stadium: Allianz Stadium; Attendance: 16,064; Referee: Ben Abraham

11 February 2023 16	Western Sydney Wanderers	0–1	Sydney FC	Sydney
19:45 AEDT	N'Gbakoto (red card) 64'	Report	Burgess 16'	Stadium: CommBank Stadium; Attendance: 26,462; Referee: Adam Kersey

18 February 2023 17	Sydney FC	1–1	Brisbane Roar	Sydney
17:00 AEDT	Parsons 90+4'	Report	Mileusnic 34'	Stadium: Allianz Stadium; Attendance: 14,168; Referee: Lachlan Keevers

25 February 2023 18	Melbourne City	3–2	Sydney FC	Melbourne
17:00 AEST	Maclaren 5', 30'; Tilio 13'	Report	Mak 28'; Caballo 90+6'	Stadium: AAMI Park; Attendance: 5,189; Referee: Shaun Evans

4 March 2023 19	Sydney FC	1–0	Melbourne Victory	Sydney
19:45 AEDT	Caceres 35'; Burgess (red card) 84'	Report		Stadium: Allianz Stadium; Attendance: 15,167; Referee: Alex King

12 March 2023 20	Wellington Phoenix	1–0	Sydney FC	Auckland
13:00 AEDT	Zawada 21'	Report		Stadium: Eden Park; Attendance: 10,420; Referee: Chris Beath

18 March 2023 21	Sydney FC	0–4	Western Sydney Wanderers	Sydney
19:45 AEDT		Report	Yengi 13'; Layouni 21', 75'; Nieuwenhof 62'	Stadium: Allianz Stadium; Attendance: 28,929; Referee: Alireza Faghani

1 April 2023 22	Sydney FC	3–3	Western United	Sydney
19:45 AEDT	Mak 22', 89'; Caballo 59'	Report	Wales 14'; Pain 25'; Brattan 56' (o.g.)	Stadium: Allianz Stadium; Attendance: 10,106; Referee: Chris Beath

7 April 2023 23	Adelaide United	1–1	Sydney FC	Adelaide
19:45 ACST	Goodwin 49'	Report	Le Fondre 82'	Stadium: Coopers Stadium; Attendance: 14,056; Referee: Alireza Faghani

16 April 2023 24	Sydney FC	4–1	Perth Glory	Sydney
15:00 AEST	Le Fondre 8'; Lolley 51'; Mak 62'; Grant 72'	Report	Zimarino 44'	Stadium: Allianz Stadium; Attendance: 12,850; Referee: Shaun Evans

24 April 2023 25	Brisbane Roar	0–2	Sydney FC	Brisbane
19:00 AEST		Report	Mak 34'; Le Fondre 77'	Stadium: Suncorp Stadium; Attendance: 12,063; Referee: Adam Kersey

29 April 2023 26	Sydney FC	2–0	Newcastle Jets	Sydney
17:00 AEST	Le Fondre 29'; Wood 63'; Kucharski (yellow card) 86' (yellow-red card) 90'	Report		Stadium: Allianz Stadium; Attendance: 12,541; Referee: Alex King

==== Finals series ====
6 May 2023 Elimination-final	Western Sydney Wanderers	1–2	Sydney FC	Sydney
19:45 AEDT	Schneiderlin 39' (pen.)	Report	Mak 69'; Le Fondre 80'	Stadium: CommBank Stadium; Attendance: 27,288; Referee: Chris Beath

12 May 2023 Semi-finals 1st leg	Sydney FC	1–1	Melbourne City	Sydney
19:45 AEST	Le Fondre 64' (pen.)	Report	Leckie 18'	Stadium: Allianz Stadium; Attendance: 15,322; Referee: Adam Kersey

19 May 2023 Semi-finals 2nd leg	Melbourne City	4–0 (5–1 agg.)	Sydney FC	Melbourne
19:45 AEST	Good 37'; Rodwell 59' (o.g.); Tilio 67'; van der Venne 82'	Report	Burgess (red card) 20'	Stadium: AAMI Park; Attendance: 9,223; Referee: Shaun Evans

=== Australia Cup ===
31 July 2022 Round of 32	Sydney FC	3–3 (a.e.t.) (3–1 p)	Central Coast Mariners	Sydney
16:00	Le Fondre 29' (pen.); Caceres 42'; Burgess 50'	Report	Nkololo 14'; Ruhs 53'; Cummings 90+5'	Stadium: Leichhardt Oval; Attendance: 3,211; Referee: Tim Danaskos
	Penalties
	Le Fondre (penalty missed); Grant (penalty scored); Kucharski (penalty scored); O'Toole (penalty scored)		(penalty missed) Cummings; (penalty missed) Farrell; (penalty scored) Ballard; (penalty missed) Roux

10 August 2022 Round of 16	Bentleigh Greens (Victoria (state))	1–2	Sydney FC	Melbourne
19:30 AEST	Riak 86'	Report	Segecic 40'; Gurd 68'	Stadium: Kingston Heath Soccer Complex; Attendance: 911; Referee: Shaun Evans

31 August 2022 Quarter-finals	Oakleigh Cannons (Victoria (state))	2–1	Sydney FC	Melbourne
19:30 AEST	Dekker 6'; Lucas 31'	Report	Segecic 74'	Stadium: Jack Edwards Reserve; Attendance: 2,142; Referee: Jonathan Barreiro

== Statistics ==
=== Appearances and goals ===
Includes all competitions. Players with no appearances not included in the list.

As of 19 May 2023

No.	Pos.	Nat.	Name	A-League Men		A-League Men Finals Series		Australia Cup		Total	
No.	Pos.	Nat.	Name	Apps	Goals	Apps	Goals	Apps	Goals	Apps	Goals
1	GK	(Australia)	Andrew Redmayne	26	0	3	0	3	0	32	0
2	DF	(Australia)	James Donachie	20	1	0+1	0	1	0	21	1
3	DF	(Australia)	Joel King	5+5	0	3	0	0	0	13	0
4	DF	(Australia)	Alex Wilkinson	15	0	3	0	3	0	21	0
6	MF	(England)	Jack Rodwell	7+3	0	3	0	0	0	13	0
8	MF	(Australia)	Paulo Retre	12+11	1	3	0	2	0	28	1
9	FW	(England)	Adam Le Fondre	14+4	10	3	2	3	1	24	13
10	FW	(England)	Joe Lolley	23+1	6	0+3	0	1	0	28	6
11	MF	(Slovakia)	Róbert Mak	23+1	9	2	1	0+1	0	27	10
12	FW	(Australia)	Patrick Wood	5+15	3	0+2	0	0	0	22	3
17	MF	(Australia)	Anthony Caceres	26	2	3	0	3	1	32	3
18	DF	(Spain)	Diego Caballo	23+1	2	0+1	0	3	0	28	2
19	MF	(Australia)	Adrian Segecic	2+14	1	1+1	0	0	0	18	1
21	FW	(Australia)	Alex Parsons	0+8	1	0	0	0	0	8	1
22	MF	(Australia)	Max Burgess	17+6	2	3	0	3	1	29	3
23	DF	(Australia)	Rhyan Grant	25	2	3	0	3	0	31	2
25	FW	(Australia)	Jaiden Kucharski	0+14	0	0	0	0+2	0	16	0
26	MF	(Australia)	Luke Brattan	23+1	0	3	0	0	0	27	0
28	MF	(Australia)	Jake Girdwood-Reich	2+9	0	0+3	0	0+1	0	15	0
29	DF	(Australia)	Aaron Gurd	8+4	0	0	0	2	1	14	1
35	FW	(Australia)	Luka Smyth	0	0	0	0	0+2	0	2	0
36	MF	(Australia)	Oscar Priestman	0	0	0	0	0+2	0	2	0
Player(s) transferred out but featured this season
5	DF	(Australia)	Connor O'Toole	0+2	0	0	0	0+2	0	4	0
16	MF	(Australia)	Patrick Yazbek	2+12	0	0	0	0	0	14	0
27	DF	(Australia)	Adrian Vlastelica	2	0	0	0	0	0	2	0

=== Disciplinary record ===
Includes all competitions. The list is sorted by squad number when total cards are equal. Players with no cards not included in the list.

As of 19 May 2023

Rank	No.	Pos.	Nat.	Name	A-League Men			A-League Men Finals Series			Australia Cup			Total		
Rank	No.	Pos.	Nat.	Name	Booked	(yellow card) (yellow-red card)	Sent off (straight red)	Booked	(yellow card) (yellow-red card)	Sent off (straight red)	Booked	(yellow card) (yellow-red card)	Sent off (straight red)	Booked	(yellow card) (yellow-red card)	Sent off (straight red)
1	22	MF	(Australia)	Max Burgess	4	0	1	0	0	1	0	0	0	4	0	2
2	23	DF	(Australia)	Rhyan Grant	5	0	1	2	0	0	1	0	0	8	0	1
3	8	MF	(Australia)	Paulo Retre	5	0	1	0	0	0	1	0	0	6	0	1
4	10	FW	(England)	Joe Lolley	2	0	1	0	0	0	0	0	0	2	0	1
5	25	FW	(Australia)	Jaiden Kucharski	0	1	0	0	0	0	0	0	0	0	1	0
6	26	MF	(Australia)	Luke Brattan	7	0	0	2	0	0	0	0	0	8	0	0
7	2	DF	(Australia)	James Donachie	7	0	0	0	0	0	0	0	0	7	0	0
8	12	FW	(Australia)	Patrick Wood	5	0	0	0	0	0	0	0	0	5	0	0
9	18	DF	(Spain)	Diego Caballo	4	0	0	0	0	0	0	0	0	4	0	0
10	17	MF	(Australia)	Anthony Caceres	2	0	0	0	0	0	1	0	0	3	0	0
10	3	DF	(Australia)	Joel King	1	0	0	2	0	0	0	0	0	3	0	0
12	1	GK	(Australia)	Andrew Redmayne	0	0	0	0	0	0	1	0	0	1	0	0
12	11	FW	(Slovakia)	Róbert Mak	0	0	0	1	0	0	0	0	0	1	0	0
12	36	MF	(Australia)	Oscar Priestman	0	0	0	0	0	0	1	0	0	1	0	0
Player(s) transferred out but featured this season
1	16	MF	(Australia)	Patrick Yazbek	1	0	0	0	0	0	0	0	0	1	0	0
1	27	DF	(Australia)	Adrian Vlastelica	1	0	0	0	0	0	0	0	0	1	0	0
Total					43	1	4	3	0	0	4	0	0	50	1	4

=== Clean sheets ===
Includes all competitions. The list is sorted by squad number when total clean sheets are equal. Numbers in parentheses represent games where both goalkeepers participated and both kept a clean sheet; the number in parentheses is awarded to the goalkeeper who was substituted on, whilst a full clean sheet is awarded to the goalkeeper who was on the field at the start and end of play. Goalkeepers with no clean sheets not included in the list.

As of 19 May 2023

Rank	No.	Nat.	Goalkeeper	A-League Men	A-League Men Finals Series	Australia Cup	Total
1	1	(Australia)	Andrew Redmayne	5	0	0	5
Total				5	0	0	5

== End of Season awards ==
On 9 June 2023, Sydney FC hosted their annual Sky Blue Ball and presented nine awards on the night.

Award	Men's	Women's
Player of the Year	(Slovakia) Róbert Mak	Natalie Tobin
Member's Player of the Year	Max Burgess	
U20 Player of the Year	Patrick Wood	Sarah Hunter
Golden Boot	(England) Adam Le Fondre	(United States) Madison Haley
U20 Player of the Year	Mitchell Glasson	
Powerchair Players’ Player of the Year	Joshua Ryan	
Chairman's Award	Spiridon Apostolopoulos (A-League Women’s kit manager and Volunteer)	
