= Melbourne Victory FC league record by opponent =

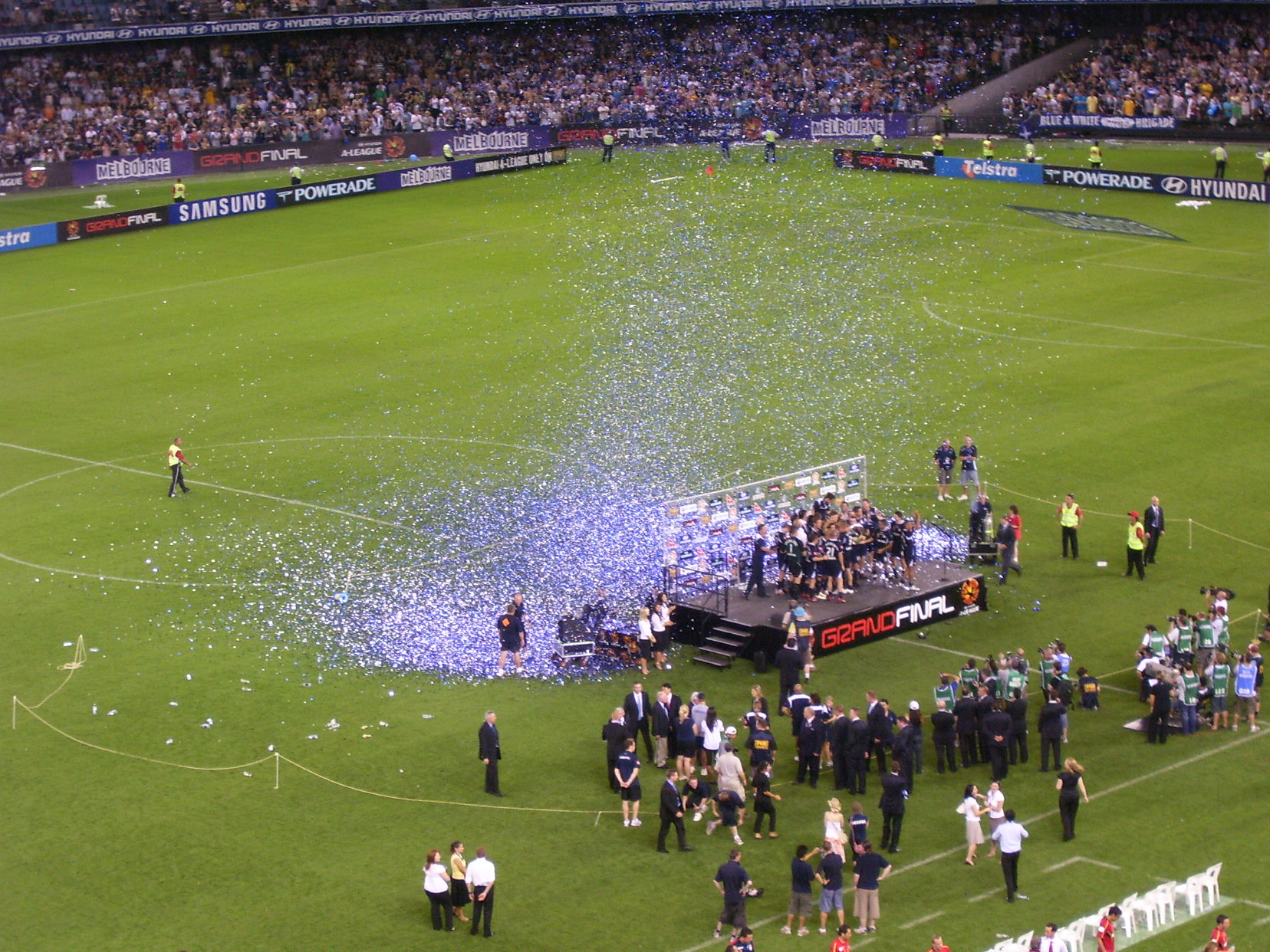
Melbourne Victory players celebrating their 2007 A-League Grand Final win against Adelaide United in February 2007.

Melbourne Victory is an Australian professional association football club based at the Melbourne Rectangular Stadium. The club was formed in 2004. They became the first Victorian member admitted into the A-League Men in 2005.

Melbourne Victory's first team have competed in the A-League Men. Their record against each club faced are listed below. Melbourne Victory's first A-League Men match was against Sydney FC. The teams that Melbourne Victory have played most in the league competition is Sydney FC, and they met their 14th and most recent different league opponent, Macarthur FC, for the first time in the 2020–21 A-League season; the 22 defeats from 60 meetings against Sydney FC is more than they have lost against any other club. Sydney FC have also drawn 20 league encounters with Melbourne Victory, more than any other club. Melbourne Victory have recorded more league victories against Adelaide United than against any other club, having beaten them 28 times out of 58 attempts.

== Key ==
- The table includes results of matches played by Melbourne Victory in the A-League Men regular season and Finals series.
- The name used for each opponent is the name they had when Melbourne Victory most recently played a league match against them. Results against each opponent include results against that club under any former name. For example, results against Melbourne City include matches played against Melbourne Heart (2010–2014)
- The columns headed "First" and "Last" contain the first and most recent seasons in which Melbourne Victory played league matches against each opponent.
- P = matches played; W = matches won; D = matches drawn; L = matches lost; Win% = percentage of total matches won
- ‡ Clubs with this background and symbol in the "Opponent" column are defunct. All matches played in the 2019–20 A-League after the postponement due to the COVID-19 are excluded as they are treated as neutral venues.

== All-time league record ==
Statistics correct as of matches played on 26 January 2023.

Melbourne Victory league record by opponent
Club	P	W	D	L	P	W	D	L	P	W	D	L	Win%	First	Last	Notes
Club	Home				Away				Total				Win%	First	Last	Notes
Adelaide United †	31	20	4	7	29	8	8	13	60	28	12	20	46.67	2005–06	2022–23	
Brisbane Roar †	26	12	7	7	27	11	5	11	54	23	12	19	42.59	2005–06	2022–23	
Central Coast Mariners †	24	14	7	3	25	10	7	8	50	24	14	12	48.00	2005–06	2022–23	
Gold Coast United	5	3	1	1	5	2	1	2	10	5	2	3	50.00	2009–10	2011–12	
Macarthur FC †	2	1	0	1	3	2	0	1	5	3	0	2	60.00	2020–21	2022–23	
Melbourne City †	19	7	6	6	19	7	5	7	38	14	11	13	36.84	2010–11	2022–23	
New Zealand Knights ‡	3	3	0	0	3	3	0	0	6	6	0	0	100.00	2005–06	2006–07	
Newcastle Jets †	26	14	3	9	24	7	7	10	50	21	10	19	42.00	2005–06	2022–23	
North Queensland Fury ‡	2	1	1	0	4	2	1	1	6	3	2	1	50.00	2009–10	2010–11	
Perth Glory †	25	12	7	6	25	7	4	14	51	20	11	20	39.22	2005–06	2022–23	
Sydney FC †	30	10	10	10	30	8	10	12	60	18	20	22	30.00	2005–06	2022–23	
Wellington Phoenix †	24	15	7	2	20	7	4	9	44	22	11	11	50.00	2007–08	2021–22	
Western Sydney Wanderers †	14	7	4	3	13	7	1	5	28	14	5	9	50.00	2012–13	2022–23	
Western United †	5	1	1	3	6	3	1	2	12	4	2	6	33.33	2019–20	2022–23	
