= 2021–22 Sydney FC season =

Sydney FC
2021–22 season
- Chairman: Scott Barlow
- Manager: Steve Corica
- Stadium: Netstrata Jubilee Stadium; Leichhardt Oval; Stadium Australia
- A-League Men: 8th
- FFA Cup: Semi-finals
- AFC Champions League: Group stage
- Top goalscorer: League: Adam Le Fondre (7); All: Adam Le Fondre (11)
- Highest home attendance: 11,404 (7 May 2022 vs. Melbourne Victory
- Lowest home attendance: 1,759 (30 March 2022 vs. Macarthur FC
- Average home league attendance: 5,534
Home colours	Away colours	Third colours

The 2021–22 Sydney FC season is the club's 17th season since its establishment in 2004. The club is participating in the A-League Men for the 17th time and the FFA Cup for the seventh time. As the runners-up of the 2020–21 A-League they qualified for the 2022 AFC Champions League qualifying play-offs phase.

== Players ==
Note: Flags indicate national team as defined under FIFA eligibility rules; some limited exceptions apply. Players may hold more than one non-FIFA nationality.

No.	Pos.	Nation	Player
1	GK	AUS	Andrew Redmayne
2	DF	AUS	James Donachie
3	DF	AUS	Ben Warland
4	DF	AUS	Alex Wilkinson (captain)
5	DF	AUS	Connor O'Toole
6	MF	AUS	Mustafa Amini
7	DF	AUS	Michael Zullo
8	MF	AUS	Paulo Retre
9	FW	BRA	Bobô
10	MF	SRB	Miloš Ninković
11	FW	NZL	Kosta Barbarouses
12	FW	AUS	Trent Buhagiar
14	FW	ENG	Adam Le Fondre
16	FW	NED	Luciano Narsingh
17	MF	AUS	Anthony Cáceres

No.	Pos.	Nation	Player
19	MF	AUS	Chris Zuvela
20	GK	AUS	Tom Heward-Belle
21	DF	AUS	Harry Van Der Saag
22	MF	AUS	Max Burgess
23	DF	AUS	Rhyan Grant
25	DF	AUS	Callum Talbot (scholarship)
26	MF	AUS	Luke Brattan
27	FW	BDI	Elvis Kamsoba
28	MF	AUS	Calem Nieuwenhof (scholarship)
29	DF	AUS	Anton Mlinaric (scholarship)
30	GK	AUS	Adam Pavlesic (scholarship)
32	MF	AUS	Patrick Yazbek (scholarship)
33	FW	AUS	Patrick Wood (scholarship)
35	DF	AUS	Liam McGing

== Transfers ==
=== Transfers in ===
No.	Position	Name	Transferred from	Type/fee	Contract length	Date	Ref
22	MF	Max Burgess	Western United	Free transfer	2 years	23 May 2021	
29	DF	Anton Mlinaric	(Croatia) Dinamo Zagreb	End of loan		2 July 2021	
2	DF	James Donachie	Newcastle Jets	Free transfer	1 year	16 July 2021	
5	DF	Connor O'Toole	Newcastle Jets	Free transfer	2 years	17 July 2021	
27	FW	(Burundi) Elvis Kamsoba	Melbourne Victory	Free transfer	2 years	22 July 2021	
35	DF	Liam McGing	Unattached	Free transfer		20 November 2021	
6	MF	Mustafa Amini	Unattached	Free transfer	6 months	24 December 2021	
16	FW	(Netherlands) Luciano Narsingh	Unattached	Free transfer	5 months	11 February 2022	

==== From youth squad ====
N	Pos.	Nat.	Name	Age	Notes
32	MF	(Australia)	Patrick Yazbek	19	2 year scholarship contract

=== Transfers out ===
No.	Position	Player	Transferred to	Type/fee	Date	Ref
2	DF	Patrick Flottmann	Unattached	End of contract	2 July 2021	
5	MF	(Germany) Alexander Baumjohann	Unattached	End of contract	2 July 2021	
27	FW	Jordan Swibel	Unattached	End of contract	2 July 2021	
6	DF	Ryan McGowan	Kuwait SC	End of contract	3 July 2021	
18	FW	Luke Ivanovic	Unattached	Mutual contract termination	20 July 2021	
29	DF	Anton Mlinaric	Brisbane Roar	Loan	25 October 2021	
16	DF	Joel King	(Denmark) OB	Undisclosed	29 January 2022	

=== Contract extensions ===
No.	Name	Position	Duration	Date	Notes
9	(Brazil) Bobô	Striker	1 year	28 June 2021	
17	Anthony Caceres	Central midfielder	3 years	30 June 2021	
4	Alex Wilkinson	Centre-back	1 year	10 July 2021	
12	Trent Buhagiar	Striker	1 year	23 July 2021	
19	Chris Zuvela	Midfielder	1 year	27 July 2021	
20	Tom Heward-Belle	Goalkeeper	2 years	27 July 2021	

== Pre-season and friendlies ==
16 October 2021	Sydney FC	5–0	Macarthur FC	Sydney, Australia
	Bobô 2', 19'; Kamsoba 55'; Le Fondre 71', 75'	Report		Stadium: Sydney FC training ground Referee: Sam Kelly

26 October 2021	Sydney FC	5–0	Newcastle Jets	Sydney, Australia
	Kamsoba 7'; Burgess 22'; Le Fondre 58'; Barbarouses 83'; Buhagiar 117'	Report		Stadium: Sydney FC training ground Attendance: 0 (behind closed doors); Referee: Craig Fisher
Note: The match was played over three 45 minute periods

30 October 2021	Wollongong Wolves (New South Wales)	0–2	Sydney FC	Wollongong, Australia
15:00 AEST		Report	Kamsoba 36'; Barbarouses 83'	Stadium: Albert Butler Oval

6 November 2021	Sydney FC	0–3	Central Coast Mariners	Sydney, Australia
		Report	Ureña 53'; Tsekenis 80', 84'	Stadium: Macquarie University Fields

13 November 2021	Sydney FC	1–0	Wellington Phoenix	Sydney, Australia
17:00 AEDT	Le Fondre 23'	Report		Attendance: 0 (behind closed doors)

== Competitions ==
Win Draw Loss Cancelled or postponed

Competition	Record							
Competition	P	W	D	L	GF	GA	GD	Win %
A-League Men	26	8	7	11	37	44	–7	30.77
FFA Cup	4	3	0	1	7	3	+4	75.00
AFC Champions League	6	0	2	4	3	9	–6	00.00
Total	36	11	9	16	47	46	+1	30.56

=== A-League Men ===
==== League table ====
Pos	Team	Pld	W	D	L	GF	GA	GD	Pts	Qualification
6	Wellington Phoenix (Note: Wellington Phoenix cannot qualify for Asian Football Confederation competitions as they are based in New Zealand, which is under the Oceania Football Confederation.)	26	12	3	11	34	49	−15	39	Qualification for finals series (Note: The top two teams enter the finals series at the semi-finals, while the teams ranked third to sixth enter the finals series at the elimination-finals.)
7	Macarthur FC	26	9	6	11	38	47	−9	33	
8	Sydney FC	26	8	7	11	37	44	−7	31	
9	Newcastle Jets	26	8	5	13	45	43	+2	29	Qualification for 2022 Australia Cup play-offs (Note: The top 8 teams qualify for the round of 32, while the bottom four teams participate in a play-off round.)
10	Western Sydney Wanderers	26	6	9	11	30	38	−8	27	Qualification for 2022 Australia Cup play-offs

Source: A-Leagues
Rules for classification: 1) Points; 2) Goal difference; 3) Goals scored; 4) Points per game; 5) Least red cards; 6) Least yellow cards; 7) Toss of a coin in an event of a tie of two clubs.

==== Matches ====
20 November 2021 1	Western Sydney Wanderers FC	0–0	Sydney FC	Sydney
19:45 AEST		Report		Stadium: Bankwest Stadium; Attendance: 23,118

27 November 2021 2	Sydney FC	0–1	Macarthur FC	Sydney
19:45 AEST		Report	Rose 17'	Stadium: Netstrata Jubilee Stadium; Attendance: 6,632; Referee: Stephen Lucas

4 December 2021 3	Sydney FC	2–2	Newcastle Jets FC	Sydney
19:45 AEST	Le Fondre 9' (pen.); Kamsoba 30'	Report	Yuel 58', 65'	Stadium: Netstrata Jubilee Stadium; Attendance: 6,943; Referee: Jonathon Barreiro

12 December 2021 4	Central Coast Mariners	2–0	Sydney FC	Gosford
18:20 AEST	Urena 14'; Caceres 16' (o.g.)	Report		Stadium: Central Coast Stadium; Attendance: 6,037

19 December 2021 5	Sydney FC	2–1	Wellington Phoenix	Sydney
18:45 AEST	Kamsoba 19'; Le Fondre 57'	Report	Waine 84'	Stadium: Netstrata Jubilee Stadium; Attendance: 5,150; Referee: Ben Abraham

26 December 2021 6	Macarthur FC	0–3	Sydney FC	Campbelltown
19:45 AEST		Report	Wood 11'; Burgess 28'; Buhagiar 58'	Stadium: Campbelltown Stadium; Attendance: 4,843; Referee: Kurt Ams

15 January 2022 10	Sydney FC	1–1	Brisbane Roar	Sydney
19:45 AEST	Caceres 34'	Report	Mileusnic 40'	Stadium: Netstrata Jubilee Stadium; Attendance: 4,098; Referee: Jack Morgan

22 January 2022 7	Sydney FC	1–2	Perth Glory	Sydney
19:45 AEST	Caceres 90+3' (pen.)	Report	O'Neill 55'; Fornaroli 85'	Stadium: Netstrata Jubilee Stadium; Attendance: 4,069; Referee: Adam Kersey

25 January 2022 8	Melbourne Victory	2–2	Sydney FC	Melbourne
19:45 AEDT	Folami 17'; Kruse 77'	Report	Ninković 37'; Bobô 81'	Stadium: AAMI Park; Attendance: 10,496; Referee: Alireza Faghani

30 January 2022 12	Sydney FC	3–2	Central Coast Mariners	Sydney
16:05 AEDT	Caceres 45+2' (pen.), 79'; Bobô 71'	Report	Bozanic 53'; Cummings 57'	Stadium: Leichhardt Oval; Attendance: 6,855; Referee: Kurt Ams

4 February 2022 13	Adelaide United	1–2	Sydney FC	Adelaide
19:45 ACST	Mauk 32'	Report	Kamsoba 10'; Bobô 73'	Stadium: Hindmarsh Stadium; Attendance: 7,245; Referee: Adam Kersey

12 February 2022 14	Sydney FC	1–1	Western United	Sydney
19:45 AEST	Burgess 64'	Report	Lustica 56'	Stadium: Netstrata Jubilee Stadium; Attendance: 4,228; Referee: Shaun Evans

19 February 2022 15	Wellington Phoenix	1–1	Sydney FC	Sydney
17:05 AEDT	Ball 43'	Report	Bobô 67'	Stadium: Leichhardt Oval; Attendance: 3,775; Referee: Jack Morgan

23 February 2022 9	Western United	3–0 (Note: Awarded score. Original score 1–0 to Western United; result was changed after Australian Professional Leagues determined there were insufficient players on the match list for Sydney FC below a certain age.)	Sydney FC	Melbourne
17:45 AEDT	Lustica 67'	Report		Stadium: AAMI Park; Attendance: 1,850; Referee: Alex King

26 February 2022 16	Sydney FC	0–3 (Note: Awarded score. Original score 1–2 to Melbourne City; result was changed after Australian Professional Leagues determined there were insufficient players on the match list for Sydney FC below a certain age.)	Melbourne City	Sydney
19:45 AEDT	Ninković 53'	Report	Retre 32' (o.g.); Leckie 90+1'	Stadium: Netstrata Jubilee Stadium; Attendance: 3,262; Referee: Chris Beath

5 March 2022 17	Western Sydney Wanderers	2–0	Sydney FC	Sydney
19:45 AEDT	Hemed 37' (pen.); Baccus 52'	Report		Stadium: CommBank Stadium; Attendance: 14,002; Referee: Alex King

12 March 2022 26	Perth Glory	0–2	Sydney FC	Perth
19:05 AWST		Report	Barbarouses 7'; Yazbek 70'	Stadium: HBF Park; Attendance: 4,708; Referee: Jack Morgan

19 March 2022 18	Sydney FC	3–0	Western United	Sydney
19:45 AEDT	Ninković 23'; Narsingh 58'; Amini 68'	Report		Stadium: Netstrata Jubilee Stadium; Attendance: 3,269; Referee: Daniel Elder

25 March 2022 20	Newcastle Jets	2–0	Sydney FC	Newcastle
19:45 AEDT	Goodwin 41', 43'	Report		Stadium: McDonald Jones Stadium; Attendance: 4,424; Referee: Stephen Lucas

30 March 2022 21	Sydney FC	2–2	Macarthur FC	Sydney
19:05 AEDT	Buhagiar 39'; Šušnjar 53' (o.g.)	Report	Dávila 8' (pen.); Šušnjar 26'	Stadium: Netstrata Jubilee Stadium; Attendance: 1,759; Referee: Chris Beath

2 April 2022 24	Sydney FC	3–2	Western Sydney Wanderers	Sydney
19:45 AEDT	Le Fondre 2'; Buhagiar 66', 71'	Report	Hemed 17'; Russell 75'	Stadium: Netstrata Jubilee Stadium; Attendance: 10,091; Referee: Alireza Faghani

6 April 2022 11	Melbourne City	4–0	Sydney FC	Melbourne
19:05 AEST	Bos 26'; Leckie 56', 72'; Maclaren 70'	Report		Stadium: AAMI Park; Attendance: 3,222; Referee: Alex King

9 April 2022 23	Central Coast Mariners	0–5	Sydney FC	Gosford
19:45 AEST		Report	Le Fondre 28', 58', 59'; Caceres 53'; Bobô 90+4'	Stadium: Central Coast Stadium; Attendance: 5,773; Referee: Jonathan Barreiro

12 April 2022 22	Sydney FC	2–3	Adelaide United	Sydney
19:05 AEST	Grant 6'; Buhagiar 62'	Report	Goodwin 36', 90+5'; Blackwood 89'	Stadium: Netstrata Jubilee Stadium; Attendance: 4,180; Referee: Alex King

7 May 2022 19	Sydney FC	1–4	Melbourne Victory	Sydney
19:45 AEDT	Le Fondre 16'	Report	D'Agostino 14'; Brimmer 30'; Geria 38'; Hamill 87'	Stadium: Netstrata Jubilee Stadium; Attendance: 11,404; Referee: Alex King

10 May 2022 25	Brisbane Roar	3–1	Sydney FC	Kippa-Ring
19:05 AEST	Parsons 36'; Lescano 40'; Ivanovic 67'	Report	Burgess 30'	Stadium: Moreton Daily Stadium; Attendance: 1,727; Referee: Adam Kersey

=== FFA Cup ===
24 November 2021 Round of 32	Sydney Olympic (New South Wales)	2–4	Sydney FC	Sydney
19:30 AEDT	Parkhouse 30'; McGing 82' (o.g.)	Report	Le Fondre 44'; Wood 59'; Kamsoba 78'; Buhagiar 90+2'	Stadium: Belmore Sports Ground; Attendance: 3,271; Referee: Ben Abraham

8 December 2021 Round of 16	Sydney FC	2–0 (a.e.t.)	Macarthur FC	Sydney
20:00 AEDT	Donachie 100'; Van Der Saag 119'	Report		Stadium: Netstrata Jubilee Stadium; Attendance: 1,201; Referee: Kurt Ams

12 January 2022 Quarter-final	Sydney FC	1–0	Brisbane Roar	Sydney
18:00 AEDT	Kamsoba 63'	Report		Stadium: Netstrata Jubilee Stadium; Attendance: 1,200; Referee: Tim Danaskos

18 January 2022 Semi-final	Sydney FC	0–1	Central Coast Mariners	Sydney
19:00 AEDT		Report	Ureña 82' (pen.)	Stadium: Netstrata Jubilee Stadium; Attendance: 1,135; Referee: Alex King

=== AFC Champions League ===
==== Qualifying play-offs ====
8 March 2022 Preliminary round	Sydney FC (Australia)	5–0	(Philippines) Kaya–Iloilo	Sydney
19:30 AEDT	Buhagiar 30'; Bobô 47', 49' (pen.); Le Fondre 71', 81'	Report		Stadium: Netstrata Jubilee Stadium; Attendance: 435; Referee: Arumughan Rowan

15 March 2022 Play-off round	Changchun Yatai (China)	Cancelled	(Australia) Sydney FC
Note: Changchun Yatai withdrew from the competition after the draw. AFC decided to cancel the play-off match, and the winner of preliminary stage, Sydney, automatically advanced to the group stage

==== Group stage ====
Pos	Team	Pld	W	D	L	GF	GA	GD	Pts	Qualification	YFM	JBH	HOA	SYD
1	(Japan) Yokohama F. Marinos	6	4	1	1	9	3	+6	13	Advance to Round of 16	—	0–1	2–0	3–0
2	(South Korea) Jeonbuk Hyundai Motors	6	3	3	0	7	4	+3	12	Advance to Round of 16	1–1	—	1–0	0–0
3	(Vietnam) Hoang Anh Gia Lai (H)	6	1	2	3	4	7	−3	5		1–2	1–1	—	1–0
4	(Australia) Sydney FC	6	0	2	4	3	9	−6	2		0–1	2–3	1–1	—

Source: AFC
Rules for classification: Tiebreakers
(H) Hosts

16 April 2022 1	Jeonbuk Hyundai Motors (South Korea)	0–0	(Australia) Sydney FC	Thống Nhất Stadium, Ho Chi Minh City
21:00 IST		Report		Attendance: 2,013; Referee: Ahmed Al Alili (United Arab Emirates)

19 April 2022 2	Sydney FC (Australia)	1–1	(Vietnam) Hoàng Anh Gia Lai	Thống Nhất Stadium, Ho Chi Minh City
18:00 IST	Buhagiar 59'	Report	Vũ Văn Thanh 26'	Attendance: 7,536; Referee: Ammar Ebrahim Hasan Mahfoodh (Bahrain)

22 April 2022 3	Sydney FC (Australia)	0–1	(Japan) Yokohama F. Marinos	Thống Nhất Stadium, Ho Chi Minh City
21:00 IST		Report	Tsunoda 80'	Attendance: 1,025; Referee: Hassan Akrami (Iran)

25 April 2022 4	Yokohama F. Marinos (Japan)	3–0	(Australia) Sydney FC	Thống Nhất Stadium, Ho Chi Minh City
18:00 IST	Saneto 6'; Nishimura 11'; Lopes 87'	Report		Attendance: 1,979; Referee: Mongkolchai Pechsri (Thailand)

28 April 2022 5	Sydney FC (Australia)	2–3	(South Korea) Jeonbuk Hyundai Motors	Thống Nhất Stadium, Ho Chi Minh City
21:00 IST	Le Fondre 40'; Wood 90+1'	Report	K.W. Han 49'; Iljutcenko 67'; Gustavo 78'	Attendance: 758; Referee: Abdulrahman Al-Jassim (Qatar)

1 May 2022 6	Hoàng Anh Gia Lai (Vietnam)	1–0	(Australia) Sydney FC	Thống Nhất Stadium, Ho Chi Minh City
18:00 IST	Brandão 39'	Report		Attendance: 11,680; Referee: Ahmed Al Alili (United Arab Emirates)

== Statistics ==
=== Squad statistics ===
Includes all competitions. Players with no appearances not included in the list.

No.	Pos	Nat	Player	Total		A-League Men		FFA Cup		AFC Champions League	
No.	Pos	Nat	Player	Apps	Goals	Apps	Goals	Apps	Goals	Apps	Goals
1	GK	(Australia)	Andrew Redmayne	26	0	16	0	4	0	6	0
2	DF	(Australia)	James Donachie	24	1	17	0	2	1	5	0
3	DF	(Australia)	Ben Warland	22	0	15	0	1	0	6	0
4	DF	(Australia)	Alex Wilkinson	34	0	26	0	4	0	4	0
5	DF	(Australia)	Connor O'Toole	17	0	13	0	0	0	4	0
6	MF	(Australia)	Mustafa Amini	24	1	17	1	0	0	7	0
8	MF	(Australia)	Paulo Retre	34	0	23	0	4	0	7	0
9	FW	(Brazil)	Bobô	26	7	20	5	2	0	4	2
10	MF	(Serbia)	Miloš Ninković	28	3	22	3	3	0	3	0
11	FW	(New Zealand)	Kosta Barbarouses	15	1	11	1	1	0	3	0
12	FW	(Australia)	Trent Buhagiar	31	8	23	5	2	1	6	2
14	FW	(England)	Adam Le Fondre	29	11	21	7	2	1	6	3
16	FW	(Netherlands)	Luciano Narsingh	14	1	10	1	0	0	4	0
17	MF	(Australia)	Anthony Caceres	34	5	24	5	3	0	6	0
20	GK	(Australia)	Tom Heward-Belle	10	0	9	0	0	0	1	0
21	DF	(Australia)	Harry Van Der Saag	19	1	11	0	4	1	4	0
22	MF	(Australia)	Max Burgess	33	2	24	2	3	0	6	0
23	DF	(Australia)	Rhyan Grant	29	1	21	1	3	0	5	0
24	MF	(Australia)	Corey Hollman	1	0	1	0	0	0	0	0
25	DF	(Australia)	Callum Talbot	24	0	17	0	2	0	5	0
26	MF	(Australia)	Luke Brattan	1	0	0	0	1	0	0	0
27	FW	(Burundi)	Elvis Kamsoba	24	5	17	3	3	2	4	0
28	MF	(Australia)	Calem Nieuwenhof	4	0	2	0	2	0	0	0
30	GK	(Australia)	Adam Pavlesic	1	0	1	0	0	0	0	0
31	MF	(Australia)	Adrian Segecic	6	0	4	0	0	0	2	0
32	MF	(Australia)	Patrick Yazbek	25	1	14	1	4	0	7	0
33	FW	(Australia)	Patrick Wood	17	3	9	1	4	1	4	1
35	DF	(Australia)	Liam McGing	3	0	1	0	1	0	1	0
	DF	(Australia)	Joel King†	12	0	8	0	4	0	0	0

Last updated: 12 May 2022
Source: https://au.soccerway.com/teams/australia/sydney-fc/4295/squad/

^{†} Player left Sydney during the season

=== Hat-tricks ===
Player	Against	Result	Date	Competition	Ref.
(England) Adam Le Fondre	Central Coast Mariners (A)	5–0	9 April 2022	A-League Men	

=== Clean sheets ===
As of 12 May 2022

Rank	Player	A-League Men	FFA Cup	AFC Champions League	Total
1	(Australia) Andrew Redmayne	4	1	2	7
2	(Australia) Tom Heward-Belle	1	0	0	1
Total		5	1	2	9

== End of Season awards ==
On 10 June 2022, Sydney FC hosted their annual Sky Blue Ball and presented nine awards on the night.

Award	Men's	Women's
Player of the Year	Anthony Caceres	MacKenzie Hawkesby
Member's Player of the Year	Anthony Caceres	
U20 Player of the Year	Patrick Yazbek	Taylor Ray
Golden Boot	(England) Adam Le Fondre	Cortnee Vine
Rising Star	Jake Girdwood-Reich	
Chairman's Award	Anthony Scaltrito (General Manager, Operations)	

== See also ==
- 2021–22 Sydney FC (A-League Women) season
