= James Donachie =

Australian soccer player (born 1993)

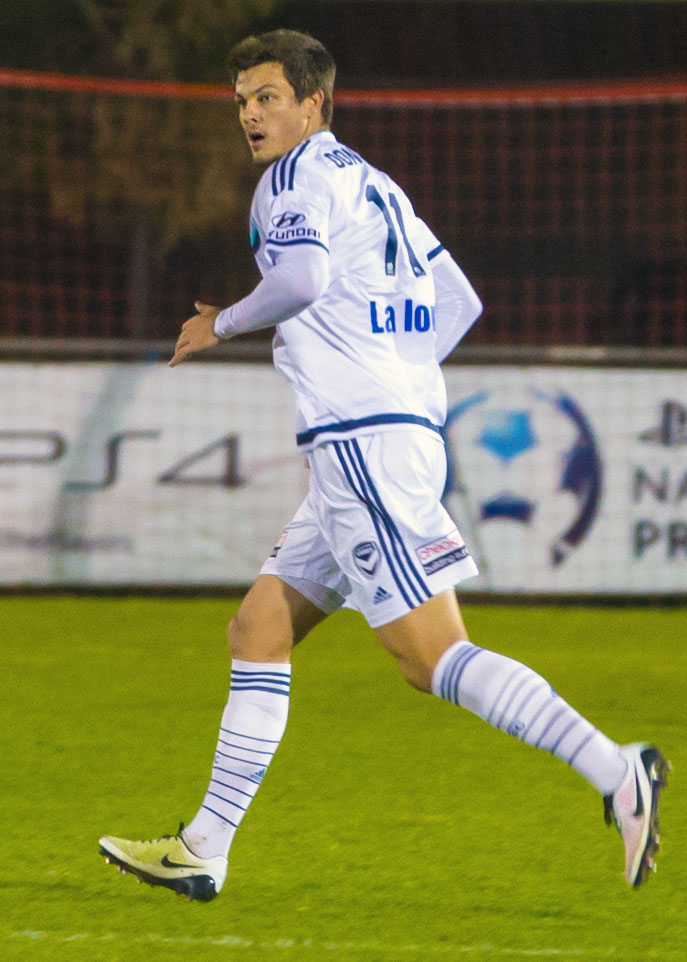
- Donachie playing for Melbourne Victory in 2016

Personal information
- Full name: James Kevin Donachie
- Date of birth: 14 May 1993 (age 33)
- Place of birth: Sunnybank, Queensland, Australia
- Height: 1.93 m (6 ft 4 in)
- Position: Central defender

Youth career
- Logan Lightning
- Rochedale Rovers

Senior career*
Years	Team	Apps	(Gls)
2010	Rochedale Rovers		(1)
2010–2016	Brisbane Roar	56	(2)
2011	→ QAS	0	(0)
2016–2018	Melbourne Victory	33	(1)
2018–2019	Jeonnam Dragons	11	(0)
2019	→ Melbourne Victory (loan)	8	(0)
2019–2020	Melbourne Victory	25	(0)
2020–2021	Newcastle Jets	0	(0)
2020–2021	→ Goa (loan)	23	(0)
2021–2023	Sydney FC	38	(1)
2023–2025	Western United	19	(1)
2025	Sydney Olympic	6	(0)
2025–2026	Central Coast Mariners	21	(1)

International career^{‡}
2012–2014	Australia U20	4	(1)
2014–2016	Australia U23	8	(1)
- * Club domestic league appearances and goals as of 3 May 2026 ‡ National team caps and goals as of 14 October 2017

James Kevin Donachie (/ˈdɒnəxi/ DON-ak-EE; born 14 May 1993) is an Australian soccer player who last played as a centre back for the Central Coast Mariners in the A-League.

== Club career ==
=== Brisbane Roar ===
In 2010, he signed a youth contract with A-League club Brisbane Roar. He made his professional debut in the 2011–12 A-League season on 25 March 2012 in a round 27 clash against Gold Coast United at the Robina Stadium. Two weeks before the start of 2012–13 A-League Donachie signed a three-year senior contract with Brisbane.

In June 2016 it was announced that Donachie would become a free agent. He was able to leave earlier than anticipated by Brisbane Roar due to an error by the club in the dates stipulated in his contract.

=== Melbourne Victory ===
On 11 June 2016 Donachie signed for Melbourne Victory for the 2016–17 A-League season. On 19 June 2018, it was announced that Melbourne Victory failed to keep Donachie at the club and he departed to join Korean club Jeonnam Dragons.

On 31 January 2019, Donachie rejoined the Victory on loan for the remainder of the 2018–19 A-League season.

On 16 August 2019, Donachie signed a one-year contract with the Victory.

=== Newcastle Jets ===
On 24 August 2020, Donachie signed a three-year contract with the Newcastle Jets.

==== Loan to Goa ====
On 26 September 2020, Donachie joined Goa on a one-year loan deal from Newcastle Jets. He has also represented the club at the 2021 AFC Champions League where they finished on third in the group stages.

After returning to Newcastle Jets from loan at Goa, Donachie's contract was mutually terminated.

=== Sydney FC ===
On 16 July 2021, Donachie joined Sydney FC on a one-year contract. Donachie would score his first goal for Sydney in the opening round of the 2022–23 A-League season against former club Melbourne Victory, which Sydney would lose 2–3.

=== Western United ===
Donachie signed with Western United for the 2023-24 season. He left the club in 2025 after making 19 league appearances and scoring 1 goal

=== Sydney Olympic ===
In between A-League seasons, Donachie signed for Sydney Olympic in the National Premier Leagues NSW competition. Having joined mid-season, Donachie completed the season with Sydney Olympic.

=== Central Coast Mariners ===
Donachie joined the Central Coast Mariners ahead of the 2025-26 season on a one year contract.

== Career statistics ==
As of match played on 22 January 2024

Appearances and goals by club, season and competition
Club	Season	League			Cup		League Cup		Other		Total	
Club	Season	Division	Apps	Goals	Apps	Goals	Apps	Goals	Apps	Goals	Apps	Goals
Brisbane Roar	2011–12	A-League	1	0	0	0	—		—		1	0
Brisbane Roar	2012–13	A-League	16	0	0	0	—		3 (Note: Two Appearances in the 2012–13 Final Series and One Appearance in the AFC Champions League)	0	19	0
Brisbane Roar	2013–14	A-League	14	0	0	0	—		1 (Note: Appearance in the 2013–14 Final Series)	0	15	0
Brisbane Roar	2014–15	A-League	17	2	0	0	—		5 (Note: Four Appearances in the AFC Champions League and One Appearance in the 2014–15 Final Series)	0	22	2
Brisbane Roar	2015–16	A-League	8	0	0	0	—		2 (Note: Appearances in the 2015–16 Final Series)	0	10	0
Brisbane Roar	Total		56	2	0	0	0	0	11	0	67	2
Melbourne Victory	2016–17	A-League	21	1	1	0	—		2 (Note: Appearances in the 2016–17 Final Series)	0	24	1
Melbourne Victory	2017–18	A-League	12	0	2	0	—		9 (Note: Six Appearances in the AFC Champions League and Three Appearances in the 2017–18 Final Serie)	0	23	0
Melbourne Victory	Total		33	1	3	0	0	0	11	0	47	1
Jeonnam Dragons	2018	K League 1	11	0	4	0	—		—		15	0
Melbourne Victory (loan)	2018–19	A-League	8	0	0	0	—		7 (Note: Five Appearances in the AFC Champions League and Two Appearances in the 2018–19 Final Series)	0	15	0
Melbourne Victory	2019–20	A-League	25	0	0	0	—		4 (Note: Appearances in the AFC Champions League)	0	29	0
Melbourne Victory	2020–21	A-League	0	0	0	0	—		—		0	0
Melbourne Victory	Total		25	0	0	0	0	0	0	0	25	0
Goa (loan)	2020–21	Indian Super League	16	0	0	0	—		7 (Note: Five Appearances in the AFC Champions League and Two Appearances in the 2021 Indian Super League playoffs)	0	23	0
Sydney FC	2021–22	A-League Men	17	0	2	1	—		5	0	24	1
Sydney FC	2022–23	A-League Men	21	1	1	0	—		—		22	1
Sydney FC	Total		38	1	3	1	0	0	5	0	46	2
Western United	2023–24	A-League Men	0	0	3	0	—		—		3	0
Career totals			187	4	13	1	0	0	45	0	245	5

== International career ==
In June 2012, Donachie was named in the Young Socceroos squad for the AFC U-22 Qualifiers.

== Honours ==
Melbourne Victory

- A-League Championship: 2017–18

Individual

- National Youth League Player of the Year: 2010–11, 2011–12
