= Paulo Retre =

Australian soccer player

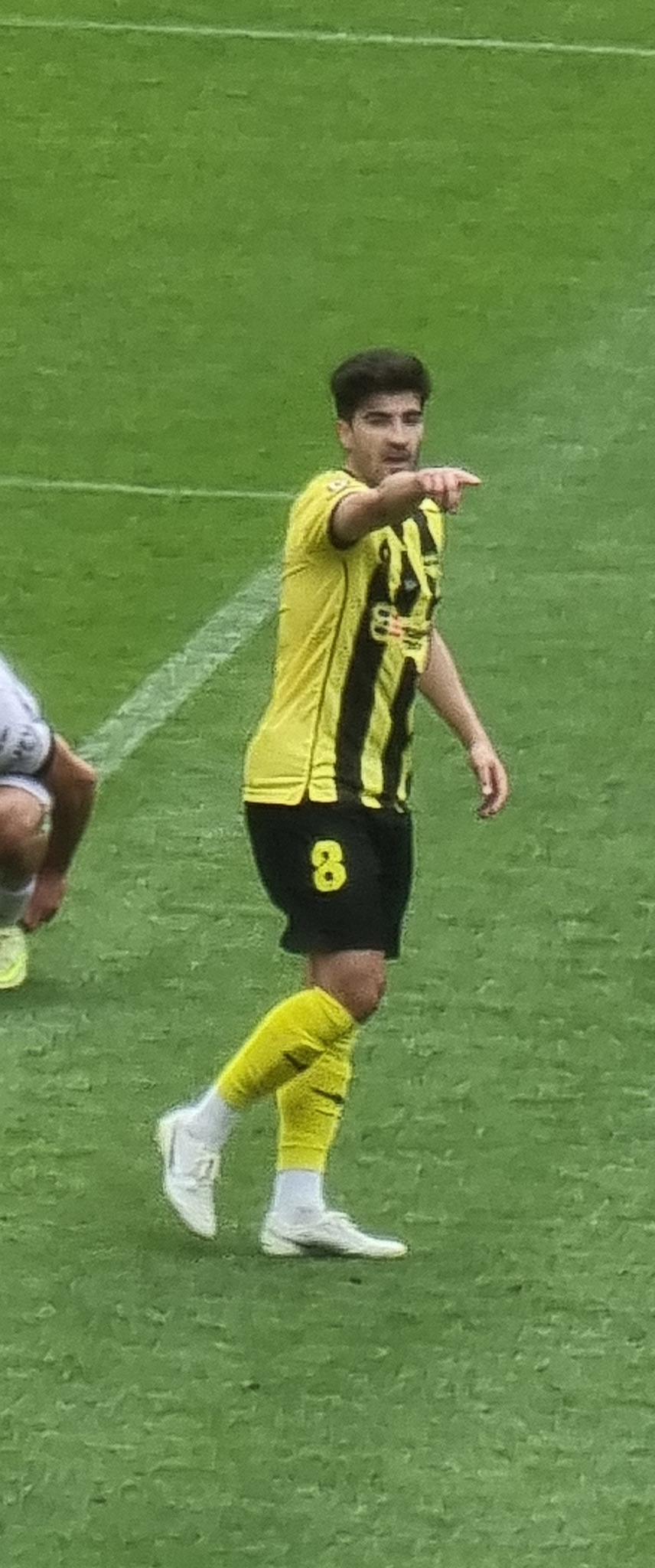
- Retre playing for the Wellington Phoenix in 2026.

Personal information
- Full name: Paulo Ricardo Pereira Retre
- Date of birth: 4 March 1993 (age 33)
- Place of birth: Melbourne, Australia
- Height: 1.79 m (5 ft 10 in)
- Positions: Central midfielder; defensive midfielder

Team information
- Current team: South Melbourne
- Number: 8

Youth career
- 2010–2012: Melbourne Victory
- 2012–2014: Melbourne Heart

Senior career*
Years	Team	Apps	(Gls)
2010	Northcote City	2	(0)
2011	FFV NTC	12	(1)
2011–2012	Melbourne Victory	0	(0)
2012	Bentleigh Greens	23	(4)
2013–2017	Melbourne City	53	(1)
2017–2023	Sydney FC	139	(4)
2023–2024	Goa	18	(0)
2024–2026	Wellington Phoenix	35	(3)
2026–	South Melbourne	6	(0)

International career^{‡}
2011	Australia U20	3	(1)
- * Club domestic league appearances and goals as of 10 August 2026 ‡ National team caps and goals as of 13 May 2015

Paulo Ricardo Pereira Retre (European Portuguese: [ˈpawlu ʁiˈkaɾdu pɨˈɾejɾɐ ˈʁɛtɾɨ]; born 4 March 1993) is an Australian professional soccer player who plays as a midfielder for NPL Victoria club South Melbourne.

== Early life ==
Born in Australia, Retre is of Portuguese descent. His father, Carlos, played in the Australian National Soccer League (NSL) for Footscray JUST.

Retre attended Rowville Secondary College, as part of the Rowville Sports Academy Football program.

== Career ==
Retre was introduced to the A-League system by Melbourne Victory, as member of the youth team and appearing for the senior team in a friendly against LA Galaxy before switching to rivals Melbourne Heart. On 19 December 2015, Retre scored his first ever goal against Melbourne Victory, in a 2–1 win in the Melbourne Derby. On 16 June 2017, Retre was released by Melbourne City.

On 22 June 2017, A-League champions Sydney FC signed Retre for 2 years. Retre scored his first goal for Sydney FC in Round 3 of the 2018–19 A-League season, against former club Melbourne City. He also scored one of the few own goals in the 2018–2019 A League season. He helped the club win two league titles while playing for them.

On 30 June 2023, Indian Super League club FC Goa announced the signing of Retre on a two-year deal.

On 26 July 2024, Retre returned to the A-League Men as the Wellington Phoenix signed him on a two-year deal. Retre scored his first goal for the Phoenix against the Newcastle Jets in a 2–1 home win on 28 December 2024.

On 29 May 2026, the club confirmed Retre's departure.

== Style of play ==
Retre plays as a midfielder. He has played as a defender. He is known for his versatility.

== Career statistics ==
As of 25 April 2026

Appearances and goals by club, season and competition
Club	Season	League			National cup (Note: Includes FFA Cup and Indian Super Cup)		Other		Total	
Club	Season	Division	Apps	Goals	Apps	Goals	Apps	Goals	Apps	Goals
Northcote City	2010	Victorian Premier League	3	0	—		—		3	0
VTC	2011	Victorian Premier League	23	1	—		—		23	1
Bentleigh Greens	2012	Victorian Premier League	21	4			—		21	4
Melbourne City	2012–13	A-League	0	0	—		—		0	0
Melbourne City	2013–14	A-League	4	0	—		—		4	0
Melbourne City	2014–15	A-League	15	0	0	0	—		15	0
Melbourne City	2015–16	A-League	24	1	3	0	—		27	1
Melbourne City	2016–17	A-League	11	0	3	0	—		14	0
Melbourne City	Total		54	1	6	0	0	0	60	1
Sydney FC	2017–18	A-League	18	0	4	0	5 (Note: Appearances in AFC Champions League)	0	27	0
Sydney FC	2018–19	A-League	21	1	5	0	5	0	31	0
Sydney FC	2019–20	A-League	26	2	1	0	4	0	31	2
Sydney FC	2020–21	A-League	25	0	—		—		25	0
Sydney FC	2021–22	A-League Men	23	0	4	0	7	0	34	0
Sydney FC	2022–23	A-League Men	26	1	2	0	—		28	1
Sydney FC	Total		139	4	16	0	21	0	176	4
FC Goa	2023–24	Indian Super League	18	0	3	0	2 (Note: Appearances in Durand Cup)	0	23	0
Wellington Phoenix	2024–25	A-League Men	20	2	1	0	—		21	2
Wellington Phoenix	2025–26	A-League Men	17	1	3	0	—		20	1
Wellington Phoenix	Total		37	3	4	0	0	0	41	3
Career total			297	13	29	0	23	0	349	13

== Honours ==
Sydney FC

- A-League Championship: 2018–19, 2019–20
- A-League Premiership: 2017–2018, 2019–20

South Melbourne FC

- Australia Cup: 2026
