= Patrick Wood =

Australian footballer

Personal information
- Full name: Patrick James Wood
- Date of birth: 16 September 2002 (age 24)
- Place of birth: North Sydney, New South Wales, Australia
- Height: 1.78 m (5 ft 10 in)
- Position: Striker

Team information
- Current team: Newcastle Jets
- Number: 8

Youth career
- Collaroy Cromer Strikers
- 2014–2015: Manly United
- 2015–2020: Sydney FC

Senior career*
Years	Team	Apps	(Gls)
2020–2022	Sydney FC NPL	21	(21)
2020–2026	Sydney FC	101	(14)
2025	→ Perth Glory (loan)	9	(0)
2026–	Newcastle Jets	3	(2)

International career^{‡}
2021–2022	Australia U23	7	(2)
- * Club domestic league appearances and goals as of 26 April 2026 ‡ National team caps and goals as of 25 August 2022

Patrick James Wood (born 16 September 2002) is an Australian professional soccer player who plays as a striker for A-League Men club Newcastle Jets.

Wood played youth soccer with Collaroy Cromer Strikers, Manly United and Sydney FC Youth before starting his professional career with Sydney FC. In 2026, he joined Newcastle Jets on a free transfer.

Wood is a former Australia youth international, having represented the nation at the U-23 level.

== Early life ==
Wood attended St Paul's College, Manly.

== Club career ==
=== Sydney FC ===
Wood was called up to Sydney FC's senior squad for the 2020 AFC Champions League. He made his unofficial first-team debut ahead of the tournament in a match against the Australian under-23 team in November 2020.

Wood made his A-League debut against Wellington Phoenix on 2 January, coming off the bench at the 82nd minute mark. On 30 January, Wood scored his first A-League goals, the first coming after being on the pitch for 6 minutes, steering his side to a 3–0 victory against Macarthur FC.

==== Loan to Perth Glory ====
On 17 January 2025, Perth Glory announced the signing of Wood on loan for the remainder of the 2024–25 A-League season. In May 2025, the club announced his departure.

==== Newcastle Jets ====
On 30 June 2026, Newcastle Jets announced the signing of Patrick Wood on a 2 year deal.

== International career ==
Wood was called up to an Australian under-20 national team camp in 2020.

In October 2021, Wood was called up to the Australian under-23 team for 2022 AFC U-23 Asian Cup qualification matches against Indonesia in Tajikistan. He made his debut for the side on 26 October 2021, missing an early penalty kick before later scoring Australia's second goal in a 3–2 win. Wood scored again in the second leg three days later, the only goal in a 1–0 win to secure qualification for the final tournament.

In May 2022, Wood was included in the Australian under-23 squad for the 2022 AFC U-23 Asian Cup.

== Career statistics ==
=== Club ===
As of match played 28 October 2026

Appearances and goals by club, season and competition
Club	Season	League			Cup		Continental		Total	
Club	Season	Division	Apps	Goals	Apps	Goals	Apps	Goals	Apps	Goals
Sydney FC Youth	2020	NPL NSW	13	11	–		–		13	11
Sydney FC Youth	2021	NPL NSW	2	3	–		–		2	3
Sydney FC Youth	2022	NPL NSW	5	7	–		–		5	7
Sydney FC Youth	Total		20	21	–		–		20	21
Sydney FC	2019–20	A-League	0	0	0	0	1 (Note: Appearances in AFC Champions League)	0	1	0
Sydney FC	2020–21	A-League	21	4	0	0	–		21	4
Sydney FC	2021–22	A-League Men	9	1	4	1	4	1	17	3
Sydney FC	2022–23	A-League Men	22	3	0	0	–		22	3
Sydney FC	2023–24	A-League Men	17	1	5	4	–		22	5
Sydney FC	2024–25	A-League Men	9	1	0	0	1 (Note: Appearances in AFC Champions League Two)	1	10	2
Sydney FC	2025–26	A-League Men	19	3	3	0	–		22	3
Sydney FC	Total		97	13	12	5	6	2	115	20
Perth Glory (loan)	2024–25	A-League Men	9	0	0	0	–		9	0
Newcastle Jets FC	2026–27	A-League Men	2	1	1	0	3	3	6	4
Career total			128	35	13	5	10	6	151	46

== Honours ==
Sydney FC Youth

- Y-League: 2019–20

Sydney FC

- Australia Cup: 2023

Individual

- National Premier Leagues NSW top-goalscorer: 2020
