= 2022–23 A-League Men =

46th season of top-tier soccer league in Australia

A-League Men
- Season: 2022–23
- Dates: 7 October 2022 – 3 June 2023
- Champions: Central Coast Mariners (2nd title)
- Premiers: Melbourne City (3rd title)
- Champions League: Melbourne City
- AFC Cup: Central Coast Mariners; Macarthur FC
- Matches: 156
- Goals: 477 (3.06 per match)
- Top goalscorer: Jamie Maclaren (24 goals)
- Biggest home win: Melbourne City 6–1 Macarthur FC (4 February 2023)
- Biggest away win: Sydney FC 0–4 WS Wanderers (18 March 2023)
- Highest scoring: Adelaide United 4–4 WS Wanderers (19 February 2023); Perth Glory 4–4 Adelaide United (23 April 2023)
- Longest winning run: 4 matches Adelaide United; Melbourne City
- Longest unbeaten run: 12 matches Adelaide United
- Longest winless run: 6 matches Macarthur FC; Melbourne Victory; Newcastle Jets; Perth Glory
- Longest losing run: 3 matches Brisbane Roar; Melbourne Victory; Newcastle Jets; Wellington Phoenix; Western United
- Highest attendance: 34,232; Sydney FC 0–1 WS Wanderers (12 November 2022)
- Lowest attendance: 1,408; Central Coast Mariners 4–1 Macarthur FC (11 March 2023)
- Total attendance: 1,115,048
- Average attendance: 7,544 ( 1,942)
- All statistics correct as of 23 April 2023. (Note: Longest runs only include regular season results)

The 2022–23 A-League Men, known as the Isuzu UTE A-League for sponsorship reasons, was the 46th season of national level men's soccer in Australia, and the 18th since the establishment of the competition as the A-League in 2004.

The regular season commenced on 7 October 2022. The season featured a mid-season break from 18 November 2022 to 8 December 2022 due to the 2022 FIFA World Cup being held in Qatar.

Melbourne City were the defending premiers and Western United were the defending champions. Melbourne City successfully defended their title, winning their third premiership in a row with two games remaining. Central Coast Mariners won their second championship, defeating Melbourne City 6–1 in the Grand Final.

This season was the first A-League Men season since 2013–14 to record an increase in average attendance compared to the previous season.

== Clubs ==
=== Stadiums and locations ===
Twelve clubs are participating in the 2022–23 season.

Note: Table lists in alphabetical order.

Club	City	Home ground	Capacity
Adelaide United	Adelaide	Coopers Stadium	16,500
Brisbane Roar	Brisbane	Kayo Stadium	11,500
Brisbane Roar	Brisbane	Suncorp Stadium	52,500
Central Coast Mariners	Gosford	Industree Group Stadium	20,059
Central Coast Mariners	Mudgee	Glen Willow Regional Sports Stadium	10,000
Macarthur FC	Campbelltown	Campbelltown Stadium	17,500
Melbourne City	Melbourne	AAMI Park	30,050
Melbourne Victory	Melbourne	AAMI Park	30,050
Newcastle Jets	Newcastle	McDonald Jones Stadium	33,000
Perth Glory	Perth	HBF Park	20,500
Perth Glory	Perth	Macedonia Park	4,500
Sydney FC	Sydney	Allianz Stadium	42,500
Wellington Phoenix	Wellington	Sky Stadium	35,000
Wellington Phoenix	Auckland	Eden Park	50,000
Wellington Phoenix	Palmerston North	Central Energy Trust Arena	15,000
Western Sydney Wanderers	Parramatta	CommBank Stadium	30,000
Western United	Melbourne	AAMI Park	30,050
Western United	Ballarat	Mars Stadium	11,000
Western United	Hobart	North Hobart Oval	10,000
Western United	Launceston	UTAS Stadium	19,000

=== Personnel and kits ===
Team	Manager	Captain	Kit manufacturer	Kit sponsor
Adelaide United	(Australia) Carl Veart	(Australia) Craig Goodwin	UCAN	Flinders University; Australian Outdoor Living (Note: Away kit)
Brisbane Roar	(England) Nick Green (caretaker)	(Scotland) Tom Aldred	New Balance	Cars4Us
Central Coast Mariners	(Scotland) Nick Montgomery	(Australia) Danny Vukovic	Paladin Sports	MATE
Macarthur FC	(Australia) Mile Sterjovski	(Mexico) Ulises Dávila	Kelme	ALAND
Melbourne City	(Croatia) Rado Vidošić	(Australia) Scott Jamieson	Puma	Etihad Airways
Melbourne Victory	(Australia) Tony Popovic	(Australia) Joshua Brillante	Macron	Bonza
Newcastle Jets	(Australia) Arthur Papas	(England) Carl Jenkinson (Australia) Matthew Jurman (Australia) Brandon O'Neill	Legend Sportswear	Port of Newcastle; Ampcontrol
Perth Glory	(Australia) Ruben Zadkovich	(Australia) Mustafa Amini	Macron	Evolution Capital
Sydney FC	(Australia) Steve Corica	(Australia) Alex Wilkinson	Under Armour	The Star
Wellington Phoenix	(Australia) Ufuk Talay	(New Zealand) Alex Rufer	Paladin Sports	Oppo; Spark
Western Sydney Wanderers	(Australia) Marko Rudan	(Brazil) Marcelo	Kappa	Voltaren; Turner Freeman Lawyers
Western United	(Australia) John Aloisi	(Italy) Alessandro Diamanti	Kappa	Simonds Homes

=== Managerial changes ===
Team	Outgoing manager	Manner of departure	Date of vacancy	Position on table	Incoming manager	Date of appointment
Macarthur FC	(Australia) Ante Milicic	Resigned	26 April 2022	Pre-season	(Trinidad and Tobago) Dwight Yorke	15 May 2022
Perth Glory	(Australia) Ruben Zadkovich	Promoted to full time	2 June 2022	Pre-season	(Australia) Ruben Zadkovich	2 June 2022
Melbourne City	(Australia) Patrick Kisnorbo	Signed by (France) Troyes	23 November 2022	1st	(Croatia) Rado Vidošić (caretaker)	23 November 2022
Macarthur FC	(Trinidad and Tobago) Dwight Yorke	Mutual termination	21 January 2023	6th	(Australia) Mile Sterjovski	23 January 2023
Melbourne City	(Croatia) Rado Vidošić (caretaker)	Promoted to full time	6 February 2023	1st	(Croatia) Rado Vidošić	6 February 2023
Brisbane Roar	(Australia) Warren Moon	Sacked	20 February 2023	11th	(England) Nick Green (caretaker)	21 February 2023

=== Foreign players ===
Club	Visa 1	Visa 2	Visa 3	Visa 4	Visa 5	Non-visa foreigner(s)	Former player(s)
Adelaide United	(England) Zach Clough	(Japan) Hiroshi Ibusuki	(Spain) Juande	(Spain) Javi López		(Spain) Isaías^{1}	
Brisbane Roar	(Austria) Marcel Canadi	(Republic of Ireland) Jay O'Shea	(Scotland) Tom Aldred	(Serbia) Stefan Šćepović		(Afghanistan) Rahmat Akbari^{2} (Sri Lanka) Jack Hingert^{2}	(England) Charlie Austin (Germany) Matti Steinmann (Japan) Riku Danzaki
Central Coast Mariners	(Brazil) Moresche	(Brazil) Marco Túlio	(France) Béni Nkololo	(Ghana) Paul Ayongo	(Vanuatu) Brian Kaltak	(Fiji) Dan Hall^{2} (New Zealand) James McGarry^{2} (New Zealand) Storm Roux^{2}	(Nigeria) Kelechi John
Macarthur FC	(England) Craig Noone	(Georgia (country)) Bachana Arabuli	(Mexico) Ulises Dávila	(Poland) Filip Kurto		(United States) Jason Romero^{3}	(Barbados) Mario Williams
Melbourne City	(Finland) Thomas Lam	(France) Florin Berenguer	(Kosovo) Valon Berisha	(Netherlands) Richard van der Venne	(Portugal) Nuno Reis		
Melbourne Victory	(France) Damien Da Silva	(Portugal) Roderick Miranda	(Portugal) Nani	(Spain) Cadete	(Spain) Rai Marchán	(Kenya) William Wilson^{2} (North Macedonia) Matthew Bozinovski^{2} (Paraguay) Fernando Romero^{3}	
Newcastle Jets	(England) Carl Jenkinson	(Georgia (country)) Beka Mikeltadze	(Japan) Manabu Saitō			(New Zealand) Dane Ingham^{2}	(Georgia (country)) Beka Dartsmelia (New Zealand) James McGarry^{2}
Perth Glory	(Curaçao) Darryl Lachman	(England) Mark Beevers	(Republic of Ireland) Aaron McEneff	(Spain) Adrián Sardinero		(North Macedonia) Stefan Colakovski^{2} (Tunisia) Salim Khelifi^{3}	(Burundi) Pacifique Niyongabire^{2} (Israel) Ben Azubel
Sydney FC	(England) Adam Le Fondre	(England) Joe Lolley	(England) Jack Rodwell	(Slovakia) Róbert Mak	(Spain) Diego Caballo		
Wellington Phoenix	(Brazil) Yan Sasse	(Bulgaria) Bozhidar Kraev	(England) David Ball	(England) Scott Wootton	(Poland) Oskar Zawada		
Western Sydney Wanderers	(Brazil) Marcelo	(Democratic Republic of the Congo) Yeni Ngbakoto	(France) Romain Amalfitano	(France) Morgan Schneiderlin	(Tunisia) Amor Layouni	(Ivory Coast) Adama Traoré^{1} (Serbia) Miloš Ninković^{1}	(Bosnia and Herzegovina) Sulejman Krpić
Western United	(Italy) Alessandro Diamanti	(Japan) Tomoki Imai	(Mali) Tongo Doumbia	(Serbia) Aleksandar Prijović	(Switzerland) Léo Lacroix	(England) Jamie Young^{2}	

The following do not fill a Visa position:
^{1}Those players who were born and started their professional career abroad but have since gained Australian citizenship (or New Zealand citizenship, in the case of Wellington Phoenix);
^{2}Australian citizens (or New Zealand citizens, in the case of Wellington Phoenix) who have chosen to represent another national team;
^{3}Injury replacement players, or National team replacement players;
^{4}Guest players (eligible to play a maximum of fourteen games)

== Regular season ==
The 2022–23 season sees each team play 26 games, starting on 7 October 2022, and concluding on 30 April 2023, with a mid-season break between 14 November 2022 and 8 December 2022, due to the 2022 FIFA World Cup. This will be followed by a finals series for the top six teams.

=== League table ===
Pos	Team	Pld	W	D	L	GF	GA	GD	Pts	Qualification
1	Melbourne City	26	16	7	3	61	32	+29	55	Qualification for AFC Champions League group stage and Finals series (Note: Determined by which of the Premiers for the 2021–22 or 2022–23 seasons accrued the most combined points over both seasons.)
2	Central Coast Mariners (C)	26	13	5	8	55	35	+20	44	Qualification for AFC Cup group stage and Finals series
3	Adelaide United	26	11	9	6	53	46	+7	42	Qualification for Finals series (Note: The top two teams enter the finals series at the semi-finals, while the teams ranked third to sixth enter the finals series at the elimination-finals.)
4	Western Sydney Wanderers	26	11	8	7	43	27	+16	41	Qualification for Finals series
5	Sydney FC	26	11	5	10	40	39	+1	38	Qualification for Finals series
6	Wellington Phoenix (Note: Wellington Phoenix cannot qualify for Asian Football Confederation competitions as they are based in New Zealand, which is under the Oceania Football Confederation.)	26	9	8	9	39	45	−6	35	Qualification for Finals series
7	Western United	26	9	5	12	34	47	−13	32	
8	Brisbane Roar	26	7	9	10	26	33	−7	30	
9	Perth Glory	26	7	8	11	36	46	−10	29	Qualification for 2023 Australia Cup play-offs
10	Newcastle Jets	26	8	5	13	30	45	−15	29	Qualification for 2023 Australia Cup play-offs
11	Melbourne Victory	26	8	4	14	29	34	−5	28	Qualification for 2023 Australia Cup play-offs
12	Macarthur FC	26	7	5	14	31	48	−17	26	Qualification for AFC Cup group stage and 2023 Australia Cup play-offs (Note: Qualified to the AFC Cup as the 2022 Australia Cup winners.)

Source: A-Leagues
Rules for classification: 1) Points; 2) Goal difference; 3) Goals scored; 4) Points per game; 5) Least red cards; 6) Least yellow cards; 7) Toss of a coin in an event of a tie of two clubs.
(C) Champions

=== Fixtures and results ===
Home \ Away	ADE	BRI	CCM	MAC	MCY	MVC	NEW	PER	SYD	WEL	WSW	WUN	ADE	BRI	CCM	MAC	MCY	MVC	NEW	PER	SYD	WEL	WSW	WUN
Adelaide United		2–1	1–4	1–0	4–2	3–0	0–1	2–1	1–1	5–1	4–4	0–1						1–1		2–0				
Brisbane Roar	1–1		1–2	0–0	0–2	0–0	3–0	2–1	3–1	0–1	1–1	1–0					0–0				0–2			
Central Coast Mariners	4–0	4–1		2–3	1–1	2–1	1–2	1–2	2–1	1–1	2–2	4–2				4–1			3–0					
Macarthur FC	2–0	3–2	1–2		1–1	0–1	2–0	1–0	2–3	2–1	2–2	2–2							0–1			0–1		
Melbourne City	3–3	2–1	1–0	6–1		2–1	1–1	4–0	3–2	2–2	3–2	2–1										4–1		4–0
Melbourne Victory	1–1	0–1	2–0	2–1	0–2		4–0	0–0	1–2	3–1	0–1	1–2		0–1			3–2							
Newcastle Jets	2–4	0–1	1–3	2–1	1–2	2–1		2–1	0–2	3–1	1–1	1–3		4–0						2–2				
Perth Glory	4–4	2–1	2–2	2–1	2–4	3–1	2–2		2–2	1–1	1–0	2–1											1–0	1–2
Sydney FC	2–2	1–1	3–2	0–3	2–1	2–3	2–0	4–1		0–1	0–1	3–3						1–0					0–4	
Wellington Phoenix	1–1	2–2	2–2	4–1	1–3	1–2	2–1	2–2	1–0		1–1	2–3	3–1		2–1									
Western Sydney Wanderers	2–3	1–1	0–3	4–0	1–1	2–1	2–0	1–0	0–1	4–0		1–0			2–0	4–0								
Western United	2–4	1–1	0–3	1–1	1–3	1–0	1–1	2–1	1–3	0–3	1–0		2–3								1–0			

Source: Keepup.com.au
Legend: Blue = home team win; Yellow = draw; Red = away team win.
For upcoming matches, an "a" indicates there is an article about the rivalry between the two participants.

=== AFC Champions League qualification ===
Due to the re-formatting of the AFC Champions League to have an inter-year schedule from September (northern hemisphere autumn-to-spring) instead of an intra-year schedule (northern hemisphere spring-to-autumn), the qualification for the 2023–24 AFC Champions League was changed. The single qualification spot for this competition goes to whichever of the Premiers for the current season or the previous season accrues the most combined points over both seasons. Melbourne City won the Premiership in both the 2021–22 and 2022–23 seasons, thereby automatically qualifying for the Champions League.

=== Melbourne Derby pitch invasion ===
During the Melbourne Derby between Melbourne City FC and Melbourne Victory FC on 17 December 2022 at the Melbourne Rectangular Stadium, the match was abandoned in the 22nd minute after several incidents of hooliganism took place both on and off the field. Throughout the match, supporters of both teams both ignited and threw flares.

In the 20th minute, the match was interrupted due to flares being ignited and thrown onto the pitch, two of which had been thrown by Melbourne Victory supporters. Conflict arose when Melbourne City goalkeeper Tom Glover, who was defending the goal in front of the Melbourne Victory supporters end, picked up and threw the flares away from the pitch, the second of which was thrown into the crowd of Victory supporters. This sparked a pitch invasion by between 100 and 200 spectators, who proceeded to attack Glover and match referee Alex King, both of whom sustained minor injuries. The match was abandoned as a result.

On 23 December, Football Australia handed down interim sanctions on both clubs while a full investigation was being conducted. Both teams had their active supporter bays closed, with Melbourne Victory further sanctioned with supporter restrictions: travelling support was banned for away games, while home games were restricted to only valid club members.

The match was resumed on 5 April 2023 from the 21st minute, with the score resuming at 1–0 to Melbourne City. The match ended in a 2-1 win to Melbourne City, with Aiden O'Neill and Nishan Velupillay scoring for the Victory.

== Finals series ==
=== Format ===
The finals series was held in mostly the same format as the previous year, run over three weeks, and involving the top six teams from the regular season. In the first week of fixtures, the third-through-sixth ranked teams played a single-elimination match, with the two winners of those matches joining the first and second ranked teams in two-legged semi-final ties. The two winners of those matches met in the Grand Final.

On 12 December 2022, the Australian Professional Leagues announced that the 2023 A-League Men Grand Final would be the first of three successive Grand Finals hosted in Sydney, regardless of which two teams earned the right to play in the final. The move received a large amount of backlash from supporters of all 12 clubs, and was overturned in the following season.

=== Bracket ===
Elimination-finals
4	Western Sydney Wanderers	1
5	Sydney FC	2
3	Adelaide United	2
6	Wellington Phoenix	0

Semi-finals
5	Sydney FC	1	0	1
1	Melbourne City	1	4	5
3	Adelaide United	1	0	1
2	Central Coast Mariners	2	2	4

Grand Final
1	Melbourne City	1
2	Central Coast Mariners	6

=== Elimination-finals ===
5 May 2023
19:15 ACST

Adelaide United	2–0	Wellington Phoenix
Goodwin 19', 67' (pen.)	Report

Coopers Stadium, Adelaide
Attendance: 10,231
Referee: Alireza Faghani

6 May 2023
19:45 AEST

Western Sydney Wanderers	1–2	Sydney FC
Schneiderlin 39' (pen.)	Report	Mak 69'; Le Fondre 80'

CommBank Stadium, Sydney
Attendance: 27,288
Referee: Chris Beath

=== Semi-finals ===
==== Summary ====
Team 1	Agg.	Team 2	1st leg	2nd leg
Melbourne City	5–1	Sydney FC	1–1	4–0
Central Coast Mariners	4–1	Adelaide United	2–1	2–0

==== Matches ====
12 May 2023
19:45 AEST

Sydney FC	1–1	Melbourne City
Le Fondre 64' (pen.)	Report	Leckie 18'

Allianz Stadium, Sydney
Attendance: 15,322
Referee: Adam Kersey
19 May 2023
19:45 AEST

Melbourne City	4–0	Sydney FC
Good 37'; Rodwell 59' (o.g.); Tilio 67'; Van der Venne 82'	Report

AAMI Park, Melbourne
Attendance: 9,223
Referee: Shaun Evans

Melbourne City won 5–1 on aggregate.

13 May 2023
19:45 ACST

Adelaide United	1–2	Central Coast Mariners
Goodwin 4' (pen.)	Report	McGarry 15'; Cummings 38'

Coopers Stadium, Adelaide
Attendance: 15,771
Referee: Alex King
20 May 2023
19:45 AEST

Central Coast Mariners	2–0	Adelaide United
Silvera 48'; Túlio 52'	Report

Industree Group Stadium, Gosford
Attendance: 20,059
Referee: Alireza Faghani

Central Coast Mariners won 4–1 on aggregate.

=== Grand Final ===
3 June 2023
19:45 AEST

Melbourne City	1–6	Central Coast Mariners
Van der Venne 40'	Report	Cummings 20', 65' (pen.), 73' (pen.); Silvera 34'; Nkololo 83'; Moresche 90+1'

CommBank Stadium, Sydney
Attendance: 26,523
Referee: Chris Beath

== Regular season statistics ==
=== Top scorers ===
As of 29 April 2023

Rank	Player	Club	Goals
1	(Australia) Jamie Maclaren	Melbourne City	24
2	(Australia) Jason Cummings	Central Coast Mariners	16
3	(Poland) Oskar Zawada	Wellington Phoenix	15
4	(Australia) Brandon Borello	Western Sydney Wanderers	13
5	(Australia) Craig Goodwin	Adelaide United	12
6	(England) Adam Le Fondre	Sydney FC	10
7	(Slovakia) Róbert Mak	Sydney FC	9
7	(Republic of Ireland) Jay O'Shea	Brisbane Roar	9
7	(Australia) Marco Tilio	Melbourne City	9
7	(Brazil) Marco Túlio	Central Coast Mariners	9

=== Hat-tricks ===
Player	For	Against	Result	Date	Ref.
(Netherlands) Richard van der Venne	Melbourne City	Macarthur FC	6–1 (H)	4 February 2023	
(Australia) Jamie Maclaren	Melbourne City	Western United	3–1 (A)	22 April 2023	
(Australia) Jason Cummings	Central Coast Mariners	Melbourne City	6–1 (N)	3 June 2023	

Key
(A)	Away team
(H)	Home team
(N)	Neutral venue

=== Clean sheets ===
As of 29 April 2023

Rank	Player	Club	Clean sheets
1	(Australia) Lawrence Thomas	Western Sydney Wanderers	10
2	(Australia) Jordan Holmes	Brisbane Roar	7
3	(Australia) Tom Glover	Melbourne City	6
4	(Australia) Paul Izzo	Melbourne Victory	5
4	(Poland) Filip Kurto	Macarthur FC	5
4	(Australia) Andrew Redmayne	Sydney FC	5
4	(New Zealand) Oliver Sail	Wellington Phoenix	5
8	(Australia) Danny Vukovic	Central Coast Mariners	4
8	(England) Jamie Young	Western United	4
10	(Australia) Cameron Cook	Perth Glory	3
10	(Australia) Jack Duncan	Newcastle Jets	3
10	(Australia) Joe Gauci	Adelaide United	3

== Awards ==
=== Club awards ===
Club	Player	Ref.
Adelaide United	(Australia) Craig Goodwin	
Brisbane Roar	(Scotland) Tom Aldred	
Central Coast Mariners	(Australia) Josh Nisbet	
Macarthur FC	(Australia) Ivan Vujica	
Melbourne City	(Australia) Mathew Leckie	
Melbourne Victory	(France) Damien Da Silva	
Newcastle Jets	(New Zealand) Dane Ingham	
Perth Glory	(England) Mark Beevers	
Sydney FC	(Slovakia) Róbert Mak	
Wellington Phoenix	(Poland) Oskar Zawada	
Western Sydney Wanderers	(Australia) Brandon Borrello	
Western United	(Australia) Josh Risdon	

=== Annual awards ===
The following end of the season awards were announced at the 2022–23 Dolan Warren Awards night that took place at The Star Casino on 1 June 2023.

Award	Winner	Club
Johnny Warren Medal	(Australia) Craig Goodwin	Adelaide United
Young Footballer of the Year	(Australia) Jordan Bos	Melbourne City
Golden Boot Award	(Australia) Jamie Maclaren	Melbourne City
Goalkeeper of the Year	(Australia) Lawrence Thomas	Western Sydney Wanderers
Coach of the Year	(Australia) Carl Veart	Adelaide United
Goal of the Year	(Australia) Giordano Colli	Perth Glory
Fair Play Award	Brisbane Roar	
Referee of the Year	(Australia) Chris Beath	—N/a

=== Team of the season ===
Goalkeeper	Defenders	Midfielders	Forwards	Substitutes
(Australia) Joe Gauci (Adelaide United)	(Brazil) Marcelo (Western Sydney Wanderers) (Vanuatu) Brian Kaltak (Central Coast Mariners) (Australia) Jordan Bos (Melbourne City)	(Australia) Aiden O'Neill (Melbourne City) (Australia) Josh Nisbet (Central Coast Mariners) (Australia) Calem Nieuwenhof (Western Sydney Wanderers) (Australia) Mathew Leckie (Melbourne City)	(Australia) Brandon Borrello (Western Sydney Wanderers) (Australia) Jamie Maclaren (Melbourne City) (Australia) Craig Goodwin (Adelaide United)	(Australia) Lawrence Thomas (Western Sydney Wanderers) (Australia) Curtis Good (Melbourne City) (Australia) Nectarios Triantis (Central Coast Mariners) (Republic of Ireland) Jay O'Shea (Brisbane Roar) (Brazil) Marco Túlio (Central Coast Mariners) (Australia) Jason Cummings (Central Coast Mariners) (Australia) Marco Tilio (Melbourne City)

== See also ==
- 2022–23 A-League Women
- 2022–23 Adelaide United FC season
- 2022–23 Brisbane Roar FC season
- 2022–23 Central Coast Mariners FC season
- 2022–23 Macarthur FC season
- 2022–23 Melbourne City FC season
- 2022–23 Melbourne Victory FC season
- 2022–23 Newcastle Jets FC season
- 2022–23 Perth Glory FC season
- 2022–23 Sydney FC season
- 2022–23 Wellington Phoenix FC season
- 2022–23 Western Sydney Wanderers FC season
- 2022–23 Western United FC season
