= Moresche (footballer, born 1998) =

Brazilian footballer

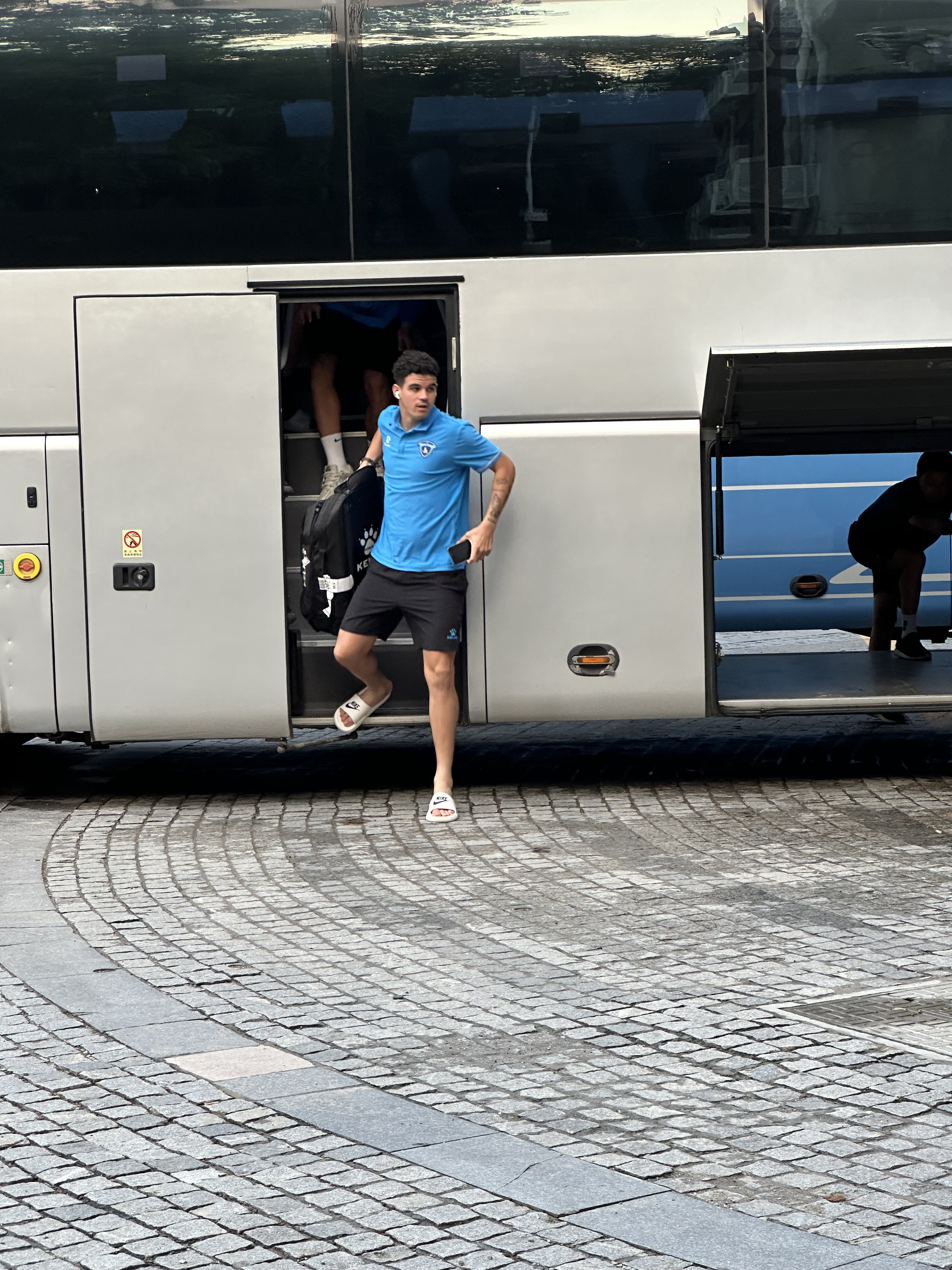
- Moresche in August 2024

Personal information
- Full name: Matheus Celestino Moresche Rodrigues
- Date of birth: 24 June 1998 (age 28)
- Place of birth: Rio de Janeiro, Brazil
- Height: 1.80 m (5 ft 11 in)
- Position: Forward

Youth career
- –2013: Botafogo
- 2014–2016: Corinthians
- 2017–2018: Vasco da Gama

Senior career*
Years	Team	Apps	(Gls)
2018–2019	Vasco da Gama	6	(0)
2019	→ Avaí (loan)	0	(0)
2020	Riga	0	(0)
2020	→ Torpedo-BelAZ Zhodino (loan)	7	(0)
2021	Geylang International	21	(11)
2021–2023	Central Coast Mariners	32	(4)
2023–2024	Naft Al-Basra		
2024	Nanjing City	29	(5)
2025	Preah Khan Reach Svay Rieng	8	(6)
2026	Volta Redonda		
2026	GV San Jose		
- * Club domestic league appearances and goals

Matheus Celestino Moresche Rodrigues (born 24 June 1998), commonly known as Moresche, is a Brazilian professional footballer who plays as a forward.

== Club career ==
=== Geylang International ===
Moresche signed for Singapore Premier League side Geylang International for the 2021 Singapore Premier League season after leaving Riga FC at the start of this year. He made his Geylang debut in the first match of the season after coming on in the 12th minute to replace Barry Maguire who had pulled up clutching his hamstring during an Eagles' counter-attack. Moresche scored a brace on his debut, helping his team to a 2–1 victory over Tanjong Pagar United.

=== Central Coast Mariners ===
On 30 October 2021, Central Coast Mariners signed Moresche for the 2021–22 A-League season. He made his debut for the Mariners as a substitute in a win over Blacktown City in the 2021 FFA Cup on 13 November 2021.

On 7 May 2022, Moresche tore his anterior cruciate ligament in an F3 Derby against Newcastle Jets. After a 9 month recovery, Moresche made his return to senior football for the Mariners on 18 February 2023, coming off the bench against Perth Glory at Macedonia Park.

Moresche was part of the 2022–23 A-League Championship winning team for the Mariners, scoring the sixth and final goal for the team.

=== Nanjing City ===
On 7 February 2024, Moresche joined China League One club Nanjing City.

=== Preah Khan Reach Svay Rieng ===
On 17 February 2025, Moresche joined Cambodian Premier League club Preah Khan Reach Svay Rieng.

== International career ==
Moresche represented Brazil at youth international level.

== Career statistics ==
=== Club ===
As of 7 July 2024

Appearances and goals by club, season and competition
Club	Season	League			State league		Cup		Continental		Other		Total	
Club	Season	Division	Apps	Goals	Apps	Goals	Apps	Goals	Apps	Goals	Apps	Goals	Apps	Goals
Vasco da Gama	2018	Série A	3	0	0	0	0	0	0	0	0	0	3	0
Vasco da Gama	2019	Série A	0	0	3 (Note: Appearances in the Campeonato Carioca)	0	0	0	0	0	0	0	3	0
Vasco da Gama	Total		3	0	3	0	0	0	0	0	0	0	6	0
Avaí (loan)	2019	Série A	0	0	0	0	0	0	0	0	4 (Note: Appearances in the Copa Santa Catarina)	0	4	0
Riga	2020	Virslīga	0	0	–		0	0	–		0	0	0	0
Torpedo Zhodino (loan)	2020	Vyšejšaja Liha	7	0	–		1	3	–		0	0	8	3
Geylang International	2021	Singapore Premier League	21	11	–		0	0	0	0	0	0	21	11
Central Coast Mariners	2021–22	A-League Men	21	3	–		5	2	0	0	0	0	26	5
Central Coast Mariners	2022–23	A-League Men	11	1	–		0	0	0	0	0	0	11	1
Central Coast Mariners	Total		32	4	0	0	5	2	0	0	0	0	37	6
Naft Al-Basra	2023–24	Iraq Stars League		1	–		0	0	–		0	0		1
Nanjing City	2024	China League One	29	5	–		3	0	–		0	0	32	5
Career total			77	19	3	0	9	5	0	0	4	0	93	24

== Honours ==
Central Coast Mariners

- A-League Men Championship: 2022–23
