= Richard van der Venne =

Dutch footballer (born 1992)

Personal information
- Date of birth: 16 May 1992 (age 34)
- Place of birth: Oss, Netherlands
- Height: 1.73 m (5 ft 8 in)
- Position: Attacking midfielder

Team information
- Current team: TOP Oss
- Number: 10

Youth career
- Berghem Sport
- FC Den Bosch
- FC Oss

Senior career*
| Years | Team | Apps | (Gls) |
| –2012 | Berghem Sport | | |
| 2012–2013 | DESO | | |
| 2013–2015 | Oss '20 | | (2) |
| 2015–2018 | FC Oss | 81 | (22) |
| 2018–2020 | Go Ahead Eagles | 56 | (17) |
| 2020–2022 | RKC Waalwijk | 58 | (9) |
| 2022–2023 | Melbourne City | 23 | (7) |
| 2023–2024 | St. Gallen | 6 | (0) |
| 2024–2026 | RKC Waalwijk | 47 | (9) |
| 2026– | TOP Oss | 0 | (0) |
- * Club domestic league appearances and goals as of 25 April 2026

Richard van der Venne (born 16 May 1992) is a Dutch professional footballer who plays for Eerste Divisie club TOP Oss.

== Club career ==
He made his professional debut in the Eerste Divisie for FC Oss on 18 September 2015 in a game against FC Eindhoven.

On 22 June 2022, Melbourne City FC announced they had signed van der Venne on a two-year contract. He made his A-league debut on 14 October 2022 in a 2–0 win against Brisbane Roar, coming on as a substitute in the 55th minute.

On 12 November 2022, van der Venne scored his first goal for Melbourne City FC in a 2–1 win against Newcastle Jets.

Van der Venne scored a hat-trick for Melbourne City FC in a 6–1 victory against Macarthur FC on 4 February 2023.

On 6 July 2023, van der Venne signed a two-year contract with St. Gallen in Switzerland.

On 3 July 2024, van der Venne returned to RKC Waalwijk on a two-year deal.

== Honours ==
Melbourne City

- A-League Men Premiership: 2022–23
