= Tom Heward-Belle =

Australian soccer player

Personal information
- Full name: Thomas Heward-Belle
- Date of birth: 11 March 1997 (age 29)
- Place of birth: Sydney, Australia
- Height: 1.92 m (6 ft 4 in)
- Position: Goalkeeper

Team information
- Current team: Montedio Yamagata
- Number: 1

Youth career
- –2014: Blacktown City

Senior career*
Years	Team	Apps	(Gls)
2014–2015	Western Sydney Wanderers	0	(0)
2014	→ Blacktown City (loan)	4	(0)
2015	Melbourne City NPL	1	(0)
2015–2016	Central Coast Mariners	3	(0)
2016	CCM Academy	16	(0)
2017–2021	Sydney FC NPL	47	(0)
2017–2023	Sydney FC	13	(0)
2023–2025	Western United	22	(0)
2025–	Montedio Yamagata	19	(0)

International career^{‡}
2015	Australia U20	1	(0)
2019–2020	Australia U23	1	(0)
- * Club domestic league appearances and goals as of 1 December 2025 ‡ National team caps and goals as of 18 November 2020

Thomas Heward-Belle (born 11 March 1997) is an Australian professional soccer player who plays as a goalkeeper for Montedio Yamagata. Heward-Belle attended the North Shore private school Barker College and played for the 1st XI there. In addition, he played for West Pymble Football Club in his junior years. Australian Goalkeeping coach Tony Franken has described Thomas to be "one of the best young goalkeepers in the world coming through".

== Early career ==
Heward-Belle was called up to the Wanderers senior squad for their 2014, and 2015 Champions League squads, and was also named in the 23-man squad for their 2014 FIFA Club World Cup campaign in Morocco, as the squads third goalkeeper.

In 2015, he left the Wanderers and signed for the Central Coast Mariners Academy. He made his professional debut for the Mariners in the A-League during the Round 12 Boxing Day fixture against Sydney FC at Allianz Stadium as a 29th-minute substitute for Paul Izzo who was sent off for a second bookable offence. Central Coast went on to lose the match 4–1. Heward-Belle conceded the penalty, even though diving the right way and managing to get a hand to the ball. He made spectacular saves but conceded a late 84th-minute goal to lose the match 4–1. He played in the 3–1 win vs Wellington Phoenix in front of a 10 000 strong home crowd.

Heward-Belle was released by the Mariners in December 2016 to focus on university studies.

== International career ==
Heward-Belle was called up to the Young Socceroos squad by Paul Okon for a series of friendlies ahead of the 2015 FIFA U-20 World Cup, however was an unused substitute for all 3 matches. He is also eligible to play for the Canada national team

== Honours ==
=== Club ===
Sydney FC

- A-League Premiership: 2016–17, 2017-18, 2019–20
- A-League Championship: 2016-17, 2019–20
- FFA Cup: 2017
