= Diego Caballo =

Spanish professional footballer

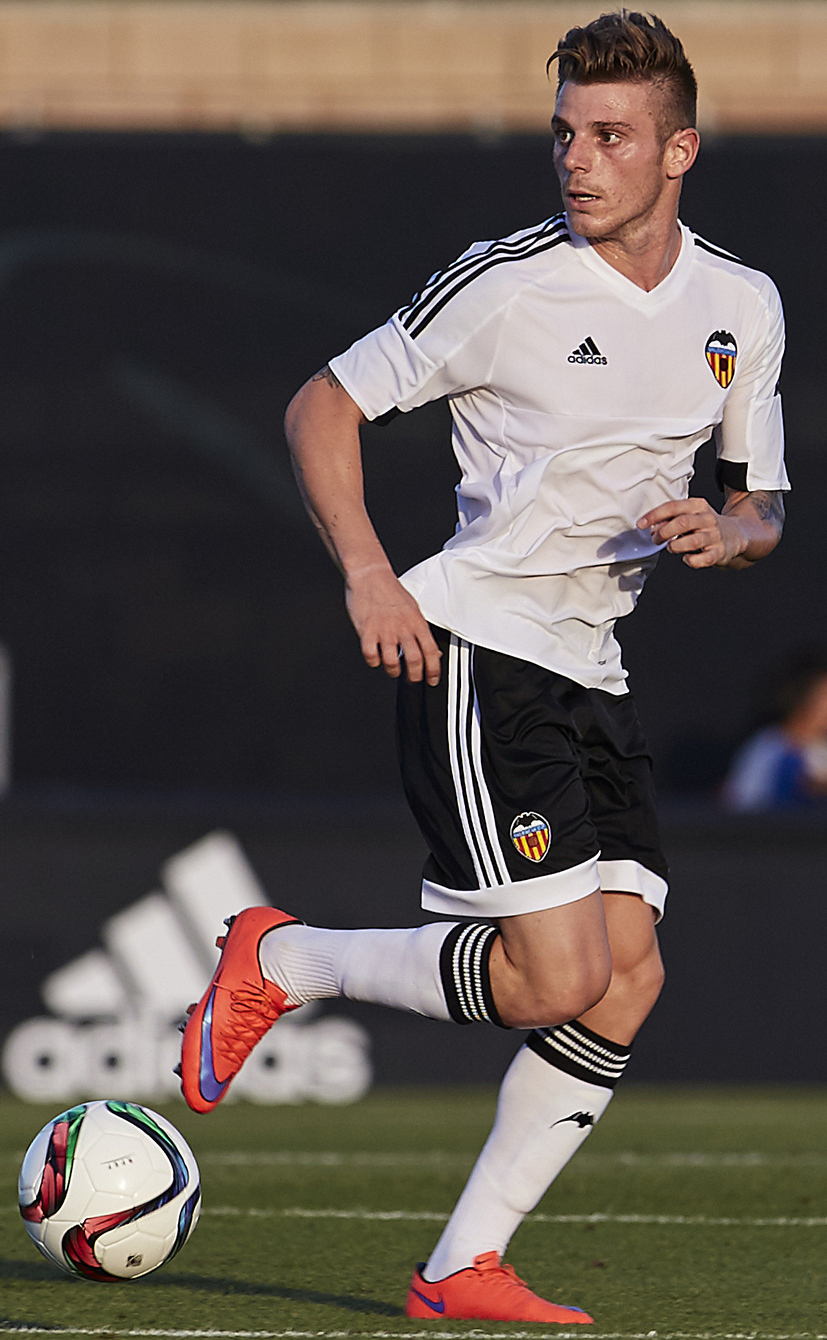

Personal information
- Full name: Diego Caballo Alonso
- Date of birth: 17 February 1994 (age 32)
- Place of birth: Salamanca, Spain
- Height: 1.71 m (5 ft 7 in)
- Position: Left-back

Team information
- Current team: Lugo
- Number: 17

Youth career
- 1999–2003: Capuchinos
- 2003–2009: Salamanca
- 2009–2013: Real Madrid

Senior career*
Years	Team	Apps	(Gls)
2013–2015	Real Madrid C	59	(5)
2014–2015	Real Madrid B	6	(0)
2015–2017	Valencia B	29	(1)
2017–2018	Deportivo B	28	(2)
2018–2019	Deportivo La Coruña	27	(0)
2019–2020	Extremadura	14	(1)
2020–2021	Albacete	31	(0)
2021–2022	CR Sabadell FC	30	(1)
2022–2023	Sydney FC	25	(2)
2023–2025	AaB	26	(0)
2025	Intercity	15	(1)
2025–	Lugo	23	(0)

International career
2011	Spain U17	2	(0)
- * Club domestic league appearances and goals as of 9 June 2026

Diego Caballo Alonso (born 17 February 1994) is a Spanish professional footballer who plays for Primera Federación club Lugo as a left-back.

== Club career ==
Caballo was born in Salamanca, Castile and León, and joined Real Madrid's youth setup in 2009, from UD Salamanca. He made his senior debut with the C-team on 24 August 2013, starting in a 1–0 Segunda División B away win against Atlético Madrid B.

Caballo first appeared with the reserves on 24 August 2014, playing the full 90 minutes in a 1–2 loss at the same opponent also for the third division championship. He scored his first senior goal with the C's on 19 October, netting the opener in a 2–0 Tercera División home defeat of CD Móstoles URJC.

On 7 July 2015, free agent Caballo signed for Valencia CF, being assigned to the B-team also in the third tier. He moved to another reserve team on 2 July 2017, after agreeing to a contract with Deportivo Fabril in the same division.

On 5 July 2018, Caballo renewed his contract with Dépor for two seasons. On 13 August, he was definitely promoted to the main squad in Segunda División.

Caballo made his professional debut on 17 August 2018, starting in a 1–1 away draw against Albacete Balompié. On 2 September of the following year, he terminated his contract with Dépor, and signed a one-year deal with fellow second division side Extremadura UD the following day.

On 22 January 2020, Caballo cut ties with Extremadura and agreed to a two-and-a-half-year contract with Albacete Balompié, still in the second division.

=== Sydney FC ===
On 13 July 2022, Caballo signed for Australian A-League club Sydney FC. After a slow start to his time at Sydney, Caballo would score a free kick to open his scoring account for the club in a 2-3 defeat to league leaders Melbourne City. His second goal was scored in a 3-3 draw against Western United in Round 22.

=== AaB ===
On 5 July 2023, Caballo signed for newly relegated Danish 1st Division side AaB for an undisclosed fee from Sydney FC.

After a half-season that saw just 80 minutes of playing time in the league over five games, AaB confirmed on January 6, 2025 that the parties had agreed to terminate the contract with immediate effect.
