= 2022–23 Central Coast Mariners FC season =

Central Coast Mariners
2022–23 season
- Chairman: Richard Peil
- Manager: Nick Montgomery
- Stadium: Industree Group Stadium; Glen Willow Regional Sports Stadium
- A-League Men: 2nd
- A-League Men Finals: Champions
- Australia Cup: Round of 32
- Top goalscorer: League: Jason Cummings (20); All: Jason Cummings (21)
- Highest home attendance: 20,059 vs. Adelaide United (20 May 2023); A-League Men Finals
- Lowest home attendance: 1,408 vs. Macarthur FC (11 March 2023); A-League Men
- Average home league attendance: 7,604
- Biggest win: 1–6 vs. Melbourne City (A) (3 June 2023); 2023 A-League Men Grand Final
- Biggest defeat: 2–0 vs. Western Sydney Wanderers (A) (4 March 2023); A-League Men; 2–0 vs. Melbourne Victory (A) (19 March 2023); A-League Men
Home colours	Away colours	Third colours
- All statistics correct as of 28 April 2023.

The 2022–23 season is the 18th in the history of the Central Coast Mariners Football Club. This is the Central Coast Mariners' 18th season in the A-League Men. In addition to the domestic league, Central Coast also participated in the Australia Cup for the eighth time.

== Players ==
Note: Flags indicate national team as defined under FIFA eligibility rules; some limited exceptions apply. Players may hold more than one non-FIFA nationality.

No.	Pos.	Nation	Player
3	DF	VAN	Brian Kaltak
4	MF	AUS	Josh Nisbet
5	DF	NZL	James McGarry
6	MF	AUS	Max Balard
7	FW	AUS	Samuel Silvera
9	FW	AUS	Jason Cummings
10	FW	BRA	Moresche
11	MF	FRA	Béni Nkololo
13	MF	AUS	Harrison Steele
14	FW	AUS	Dylan Wenzel-Halls
15	DF	NZL	Storm Roux
18	DF	AUS	Jacob Farrell
20	GK	AUS	Danny Vukovic (captain)
22	DF	AUS	Cameron Windust (scholarship)
23	DF	FIJ	Dan Hall

No.	Pos.	Nation	Player
24	GK	AUS	Yaren Sözer
25	DF	AUS	Nectarios Triantis
27	DF	AUS	Sasha Kuzevski (scholarship)
28	MF	AUS	James Bayliss (scholarship)
31	FW	AUS	Christian Theoharous
32	DF	AUS	Dean Larson (scholarship)
33	DF	AUS	Joshua Hong (scholarship)
36	MF	AUS	Maksim Kasalovic (scholarship)
37	MF	AUS	Lachlan Bayliss (scholarship)
39	FW	AUS	Miguel Di Pizio (scholarship)
40	GK	AUS	Anthony Pavlesic (scholarship)
47	FW	AUS	Olayinka Sunmola (scholarship)
90	FW	GHA	Paul Ayongo
98	MF	BRA	Marco Túlio

== Transfers ==
=== Transfers in ===
No.	Position	Player	Transferred from	Type/fee	Contract length	Date	Ref
2	DF	Thomas Aquilina	Western Sydney Wanderers	Free transfer	2 years	9 June 2022	
21	MF	Michael Ruhs	Macarthur FC	Free transfer	2 years	9 June 2022	
7	MF	Samuel Silvera	(Portugal) Paços de Ferreira	Free transfer	3 years	22 June 2022	
90	FW	(Ghana) Paul Ayongo	(Portugal) Académico de Viseu	Free transfer	2 years	3 July 2022	
25	DF	Nectarios Triantis	Unattached	Free transfer	3 years	26 July 2022	
20	GK	Danny Vukovic	(Netherlands) NEC	Free transfer		5 August 2022	
17	DF	(Nigeria) Kelechi John	Unattached	Free transfer		16 August 2022	
98	MF	(Brazil) Marco Túlio	(Portugal) Sporting CP B	Free transfer	1 year	19 September 2022	
3	DF	(Vanuatu) Brian Kaltak	Unattached	Free transfer	Injury replacement for Moresche	27 September 2022	
31	FW	Christian Theoharous	Western United	Free transfer	6 months	17 January 2023	
14	FW	Dylan Wenzel-Halls	Western United	Free transfer	2.5 years	31 January 2023	
5	DF	(New Zealand) James McGarry	Newcastle Jets	Free transfer	6 months	8 February 2023	

==== From academy squad ====
N	Pos.	Nat.	Name	Age	Notes
14	FW	(Australia)	Garang Kuol	17	2-year senior contract
38	DF	(Australia)	Jakob Cresnar	21	scholarship contract
22	DF	(Australia)	Cameron Windust	21	1-year scholarship contract
27	DF	(Australia)	Sasha Kuzevski	21	1-year scholarship contract
28	MF	(Australia)	James Bayliss	22	1-year scholarship contract
29	FW	(Australia)	Dor Jok	21	1-year scholarship contract
37	MF	(Australia)	Lachlan Bayliss	20	6-month scholarship contract
33	DF	(Australia)	Joshua Hong	21	6-month scholarship contract
32	DF	(Australia)	Dean Larson	20	scholarship contract
36	MF	(Australia)	Maksim Kasalovic	19	scholarship contract
47	FW	(Australia)	Olayinka Sunmola	20	6-month scholarship contract
40	GK	(Australia)	Anthony Pavlesic	17	scholarship contract
39	FW	(Australia)	Miguel di Pizio	17	scholarship contract

=== Transfers out ===
No.	Position	Player	Transferred to	Type/fee	Date	Ref
3	DF	Lewis Miller	Macarthur FC	End of contract	6 June 2022	
5	DF	Noah Smith	Unattached	End of contract	6 June 2022	
8	MF	Oliver Bozanic	Unattached	End of contract	6 June 2022	
21	DF	Ruon Tongyik	Unattached	End of contract	6 June 2022	
25	DF	Matt Hatch	Unattached	End of contract	6 June 2022	
27	MF	(Germany) Nicolai Müller	Unattached	End of contract	6 June 2022	
14	DF	Kye Rowles	(Scotland) Heart of Midlothian	Undisclosed	9 June 2022	
1	GK	Mark Birighitti	(Scotland) Dundee United	Undisclosed	19 July 2022	
12	FW	(Costa Rica) Marco Ureña	Unattached	Mutual contract termination	21 July 2022	
7	MF	(Japan) Cy Goddard	(United States) Detroit City	Mutual contract termination	26 July 2022	
19	FW	Matt Simon	Retired		3 October 2022	
14	FW	Garang Kuol	(England) Newcastle United	Undisclosed	1 January 2023	
17	DF	(Nigeria) Kelechi John	(Portugal) Belenenses SAD	Undisclosed	1 February 2023	
38	DF	Jakob Cresnar	(Australia) Sydney Olympic	Free transfer	5 February 2023	
21	FW	Michael Ruhs	Western United	Mutual contract termination	6 February 2023	
2	DF	Thomas Aquilina	Newcastle Jets	Mutual contract termination	8 February 2023	
29	FW	Dor Jok	(Australia) Port Melbourne	Free transfer	24 February 2023	

=== Contract extensions ===
No.	Player	Position	Duration	Date	Notes	Ref.
4	Josh Nisbet	Midfielder	2 years	7 June 2022		
6	Max Balard	Central midfielder	1 year	14 June 2022	Contract extended from end of 2022–23 until end of 2023–24.	
23	(Fiji) Dan Hall	Centre-back	1 year	14 June 2022	Contract extended from end of 2022–23 until end of 2023–24.	
9	Jason Cummings	Striker	1 year	16 June 2022	Contract extended from end of 2022–23 until end of 2023–24.	
15	(New Zealand) Storm Roux	Right-back	1 year	17 June 2022		
24	Yaren Sözer	Goalkeeper	1 year	17 June 2022		
11	(France) Béni Nkololo	Winger	2 years	21 June 2022	New two-year contract signed, replacing previous contract which was until end of 2022–23.	
18	Jacob Farrell	Left-back	3 years	22 July 2022		
13	Harrison Steele	Central midfielder	3 years	25 July 2022		
3	(Vanuatu) Brian Kaltak	Centre-back	2 years	11 January 2023		
15	(New Zealand) Storm Roux	Right-back	1 year	12 January 2023	Contract extended from end of 2022–23 until end of 2023–24.	
27	Sasha Kuzevski	Right-back	1 year	18 January 2023	Contract extended from end of 2022–23 until end of 2023–24.	
5	(New Zealand) James McGarry	Left-back	2 years	10 March 2023	Contract extended from end of 2022–23 until end of 2024–25.	

== Pre-season and friendlies ==
Win Draw Loss Fixtures

23 July 2022	Central Coast Mariners	4–0	Macarthur FC	Gosford
	Ayongo; Ruhs; Nkololo; ? (o.g.)	Report		Stadium: Central Coast Stadium; Attendance: 0 (behind closed doors)

6 August 2022	Central Coast Mariners	2–0	Wellington Phoenix	Sydney
	Nkololo (?); Hall 30'	Report		Stadium: Valentine Sports Park
Note: Match was played over three 30 minute periods

21 August 2022	Central Coast Mariners	6–1	(Australia) Broadmeadow Magic	Lisarow
10:00 AEST	Silvera 4', 36'; 45' (o.g.); Kuol 77', 89'; Cummings 89'	Report	43' (pen.)	Stadium: Pluim Park; Referee: Kurt Ams

24 August 2022	Capital All-Stars (Australia)	0–4	Central Coast Mariners	Canberra
18:30 AEST		Report	Silvera 43'; Kuol 51'; Ruhs 64'; Kaltak 82'	Stadium: Deakin Stadium; Attendance: 1,310; Referee: Tim Danaskos

3 September 2022 Family Day	Central Coast Mariners	2–0	Melbourne City	Gosford
16:00 AEST	Cummings 9'; Ruhs 57'	Report		Stadium: Central Coast Stadium

8 September 2022	Central Coast Mariners	0–0	Perth Glory	Gosford
		Report		Stadium: Central Coast Stadium; Attendance: 0 (behind closed doors)

15 September 2022	Sydney FC	2–1	Central Coast Mariners	Sydney
	Le Fondre; Parsons	Report	Duncan
Note: Match was played over three 45 minute periods

17 September 2022	Central Coast Mariners	4–2	Melbourne City	Sydney
10:00 AEST	Ruhs 27'; Silvera 45'; Jok 75'; Duncan 87'	Report	Maclaren 3'; Nabbout 76'	Stadium: Valentine Sports Park

21 September 2022	Melbourne Victory	2–3	Central Coast Mariners	Melbourne
16:00 AEST	D'Agostino 12', 26'	Report	Silvera 4'; Ayongo 47', 53'	Stadium: Epping Stadium; Attendance: 0 (Behind closed doors)

25 September 2022	Western United	2–1	Central Coast Mariners	Melbourne
15:00 AEST	Tratt 76'; Pain 81'	Report	Ruhs 37'	Stadium: The Hangar; Attendance: 0 (behind closed doors)

1 October 2022	Western Sydney Wanderers	0–2	Central Coast Mariners	Sydney
15:00 AEST		Report	Ruhs; Ayongo (pen.)	Attendance: 0 (behind closed doors)

17 November 2022 2022 VFF Friendship Cup	Central Coast Mariners	0–1	(Vanuatu) Ifira Black Bird	Port Vila, Vanuatu
18:00 VUT		Report	Tas	Stadium: Korman Stadium

19 November 2022 2022 VFF Friendship Cup	Vanuatu	0–1	Central Coast Mariners	Port Vila, Vanuatu
18:00 VUT		Report]	Windust	Stadium: Korman Stadium

21 November 2022 2022 VFF Friendship Cup	Vanuatu development team	1–0	Central Coast Mariners	Port Vila, Vanuatu
18:00 VUT		Report		Stadium: Korman Stadium

== Competitions ==
=== Overall record ===
Competition	First match	Last match	Starting round	Final position	Record							
Competition	First match	Last match	Starting round	Final position	Pld	W	D	L	GF	GA	GD	Win %
A-League Men	16 October 2022	28 April 2023	Matchday 1	2nd	26	13	5	8	55	35	+20	50.00
A-League Men Finals	13 May 2023	3 June 2023	Semi-finals	Winners	3	3	0	0	10	2	+8	100.00
Australia Cup	31 July 2022		Round of 32	Round of 32	1	0	1	0	3	3	+0	0.00
Total					30	16	6	8	68	40	+28	53.33

Last updated: 3 June 2023
Source: Soccerway

=== A-League Men ===
==== League table ====
Pos	Team	Pld	W	D	L	GF	GA	GD	Pts	Qualification
1	Melbourne City	26	16	7	3	61	32	+29	55	Qualification for AFC Champions League group stage and Finals series (Note: Determined by which of the Premiers for the 2021–22 or 2022–23 seasons accrued the most combined points over both seasons.)
2	Central Coast Mariners (C)	26	13	5	8	55	35	+20	44	Qualification for AFC Cup group stage and Finals series
3	Adelaide United	26	11	9	6	53	46	+7	42	Qualification for Finals series (Note: The top two teams enter the finals series at the semi-finals, while the teams ranked third to sixth enter the finals series at the elimination-finals.)
4	Western Sydney Wanderers	26	11	8	7	43	27	+16	41	Qualification for Finals series
5	Sydney FC	26	11	5	10	40	39	+1	38	Qualification for Finals series

Source: A-Leagues
Rules for classification: 1) Points; 2) Goal difference; 3) Goals scored; 4) Points per game; 5) Least red cards; 6) Least yellow cards; 7) Toss of a coin in an event of a tie of two clubs.
(C) Champions

==== Results summary ====
Overall								Home						Away					
Pld	W	D	L	GF	GA	GD	Pts	W	D	L	GF	GA	GD	W	D	L	GF	GA	GD
26	13	5	8	55	35	+20	44	7	3	3	31	17	+14	6	2	5	24	18	+6

Last updated: 28 April 2023.
Source: Ultimate A-League

==== Results by round ====
Round	2	3	4	5	6	7	8	1^{1}	9	10	11	12	13	14	15	16	17	18	19	20	21	22	23	24	25	26
Ground	A	H	H	A	H	H	H	H	A	H	H	A	A	H	A	A	A	H	A	H	A	H	A	H	A	A
Result	D	L	W	W	L	L	W	W	L	W	W	W	L	D	L	W	D	D	L	W	L	W	W	D	W	W
Position	8	11	7	4	5	8	5	3	4	3	2	2	2	2	3	2	2	2	4	3	4	3	3	3	3	2
Points	1	1	4	7	7	7	10	13	13	16	19	22	22	23	23	26	27	28	28	31	31	34	37	38	41	44

Updated to match(es) played on 28 April 2023. Source: Ultimate A-League
A = Away; H = Home; W = Win; D = Draw; L = Loss
Notes: ^{1} Round 1 was postponed and played between rounds 8 and 9 due to severe rainfall. The position is after the postponed match.

==== Matches ====
16 October 2022 2	Wellington Phoenix	2–2	Central Coast Mariners	Wellington
13:00	Waine 57'; Ayongo 88' (o.g.)	Report	Silvera 59'; Cummings 64'	Stadium: Sky Stadium; Attendance: 7,089; Referee: Johnathan Barreiro

23 October 2022 3	Central Coast Mariners	1–2	Perth Glory	Gosford
17:00 AEDT	Silvera 21'	Report	Colli 43'; McEneff 56'	Stadium: Central Coast Stadium; Attendance: 5,619; Referee: Lachlan Keevers

29 October 2022 4	Central Coast Mariners	4–2	Western United	Gosford
17:15 AEDT	Cummings 67'; Nkololo 74'; Farrell 78'; Ayongo 88'	Report	Milanovic 17'; Pain 28'	Stadium: Central Coast Stadium; Attendance: 4,773; Referee: Stephen Lucas

5 November 2022 5	Western Sydney Wanderers	0–3	Central Coast Mariners	Sydney
19:45 AEDT		Report	Ruhs 66', 73'; Silvera 81'	Stadium: CommBank Stadium; Attendance: 9,142; Referee: Kurt Ams

13 November 2022 6	Central Coast Mariners	2–3	Macarthur FC	Gosford
15:00 AEDT	Kuol 65' (pen.), 72'	Report	Toure 14'; Aspropotamitis 48'; Drew 90+5'	Stadium: Central Coast Stadium; Attendance: 6,736; Referee: Daniel Elder

Mid-season break for 2022 FIFA World Cup

11 December 2022 7	Central Coast Mariners	1–2	Newcastle Jets	Gosford
15:00 AEDT	Cummings 53'	Report	Buhagiar 12'; Mikeltadze 66'	Stadium: Industree Group Stadium; Attendance: 7,078; Referee: Ben Abraham

17 December 2022 8	Central Coast Mariners	2–1	Sydney FC	Gosford
17:00 AEDT	Túlio 36'; Hall 39'	Report	Retre 11'	Stadium: Industree Group Stadium; Attendance: 6,579; Referee: Jack Morgan

21 December 2022 1	Central Coast Mariners	3–0	Newcastle Jets	Gosford
19:00 AEDT	Túlio 22'; Cummings 63'; Nkololo 87' (pen.)	Report		Stadium: Central Coast Stadium; Attendance: 7,173; Referee: Lachlan Keevers

27 December 2022 9	Melbourne City	1–0	Central Coast Mariners	Melbourne
17:00 AEDT	Maclaren 39'	Report		Stadium: AAMI Park; Attendance: 4,341; Referee: Adam Kersey

31 December 2022 10	Central Coast Mariners	2–1	Melbourne Victory	Gosford
19:00 AEDT	Cummings 11', 53'	Report	Cadete 39'	Stadium: Central Coast Stadium; Attendance: 10,373; Referee: Daniel Elder

7 January 2023 11	Central Coast Mariners	4–0	Adelaide United	Gosford
17:00 AEDT	Popovic 31' (o.g.); Nkololo 48'; Madanha 55' (o.g.); Farrell 58'	Report		Stadium: Central Coast Stadium; Attendance: 6,914; Referee: Alex King

13 January 2023 12	Macarthur FC	1–2	Central Coast Mariners	Sydney
19:45 AEDT	Millar 57'	Report	Túlio 4'; Cummings 26'	Stadium: Campbelltown Stadium; Attendance: 4,621; Referee: Alireza Faghani

22 January 2023 13	Wellington Phoenix	2–1	Central Coast Mariners	Wellington
13:00 AEDT	Rufer 32'; Zawada 40'	Report	Nkololo 90+2'	Stadium: Sky Stadium; Attendance: 5,543; Referee: Casey Reibelt

28 January 2023 14	Central Coast Mariners	2–2	Western Sydney Wanderers	Gosford
19:45 AEDT	Silvera 30'; Cummings 73'	Report	Ngbakoto 35'; Borrello 60'	Stadium: Central Coast Stadium; Attendance: 8,565; Referee: Shaun Evans

4 February 2023 15	Sydney FC	3–2	Central Coast Mariners	Sydney
17:00 AEDT	Le Fondre 10', 72'; Lolley 58'	Report	Cummings 20' (pen.), 33'	Stadium: Allianz Stadium; Attendance: 16,064; Referee: Ben Abraham

10 February 2023 16	Brisbane Roar	1–2	Central Coast Mariners	Brisbane
19:45 AEDT	O'Shea 23' (pen.)	Report	Túlio 19'; Nkololo 69' (pen.)	Stadium: Kayo Stadium; Attendance: 2,345; Referee: Jonathon Barreiro

19 February 2023 17	Perth Glory	2–2	Central Coast Mariners	Perth
15:00 AEDT	Khelifi 16', 51' (pen.)	Report	Cummings 74' (pen.), 81' (pen.)	Stadium: Macedonia Park; Attendance: 3,887; Referee: Adam Kersey

24 February 2023 18	Central Coast Mariners	1–1	Wellington Phoenix	Gosford
19:45 AEDT	McGarry 12'	Report	Zawada 90+4'	Stadium: Central Coast Stadium; Attendance: 5,462; Referee: Jack Morgan

4 March 2023 19	Western Sydney Wanderers	2–0	Central Coast Mariners	Sydney
17:00 AEDT	Borrello 26'; Amalfitano 60'	Report		Stadium: CommBank Stadium; Attendance: 9,899; Referee: Chris Beath

11 March 2023 20	Central Coast Mariners	4–1	Macarthur FC	Mudgee
19:45 AEDT	McGarry 30'; Cummings 47', 63' (pen.); Túlio 51'	Report	De Silva 11'	Stadium: Glen Willow Regional Sports Stadium; Attendance: 1,408; Referee: Shaun Evans

19 March 2023 21	Melbourne Victory	2–0	Central Coast Mariners	Melbourne
17:00 AEDT	Fornaroli 16'; Romero 56'	Report		Stadium: AAMI Park; Attendance: 5,028; Referee: Jonathon Barreiro

1 April 2023 22	Central Coast Mariners	4–1	Brisbane Roar	Gosford
17:00 AEDT	Túlio 15'; Nisbet 17'; Holmes 30' (o.g.); Cummings 58' (pen.)	Report	O'Shea 82' (pen.)	Stadium: Industree Group Stadium; Attendance: 5,517; Referee: Daniel Elder

7 April 2023 23	Western United	0–3	Central Coast Mariners	Ballarat
15:00 AEST		Report	Cummings 21'; Nkololo 35'; Wenzel-Halls 90+1'	Stadium: Mars Stadium; Attendance: 3,218; Referee: Jonathon Barreiro

15 April 2023 24	Central Coast Mariners	1–1	Melbourne City	Gosford
17:00 AEST	Nisbet 78'	Report	Bos 63'	Stadium: Central Coast Stadium; Attendance: 10,556; Referee: Alireza Faghani

22 April 2023 25	Newcastle Jets	1–3	Central Coast Mariners	Newcastle
17:00 AEST	Sotirio 9'	Report	Silvera 28', 58'; Túlio 69'	Stadium: McDonald Jones Stadium; Attendance: 9,271; Referee: Shaun Evans

29 April 2023 26	Adelaide United	1–4	Central Coast Mariners	Adelaide
16:30 ACST	Kitto 90+3'	Report	Túlio 23', 57'; Nkololo 41'; Steele 87'	Stadium: Coopers Stadium; Attendance: 12,064; Referee: Chris Beath

==== Finals series ====
13 May 2023 Semi final	Adelaide United	1–2	Central Coast Mariners	Adelaide
19:45 ACDT	Goodwin 4' (pen.)	Report	McGarry 15'; Cummings 38'	Stadium: Coopers Stadium; Attendance: 15,771; Referee: Alex King

20 May 2023 Semi final	Central Coast Mariners	2–0 (4–1 agg.)	Adelaide United	Gosford
19:45 AEST	Silvera 48'; Túlio 52'	Report		Stadium: Central Coast Stadium; Attendance: 20,059; Referee: Alireza Faghani

3 June 2023 Grand Final	Melbourne City	1–6	Central Coast Mariners	Sydney
19:45 AEST	van der Venne 40'	Report	Cummings 20', 66' (pen.), 73' (pen.); Silvera 34'; Nkololo 83'; Moresche 90+1'	Stadium: CommBank Stadium; Attendance: 26,523; Referee: Chris Beath

=== Australia Cup ===
31 July 2022 Round of 32	Sydney FC	3–3 (a.e.t.) (3–1 p)	Central Coast Mariners	Sydney
16:00	Le Fondre 29' (pen.); Caceres 42'; Burgess 50'	Report	Nkololo 14'; Ruhs 53'; Cummings 90+5'	Stadium: Leichhardt Oval; Attendance: 3,061; Referee: Tim Danaskos
	Penalties
	Le Fondre (penalty missed); Grant (penalty scored); Kucharski (penalty scored); O'Toole (penalty scored)		(penalty missed) Cummings; (penalty missed) Farrell; (penalty scored) Balard; (penalty missed) Roux

== Statistics ==
=== Appearances and goals ===
Includes all competitions. Players with no appearances not included in the list.

As of 3 June 2023

No.	Pos.	Nat.	Player	A-League Men				Australia Cup		Total	
No.	Pos.	Nat.	Player	Regular season		Finals		Australia Cup		Total	
No.	Pos.	Nat.	Player	Apps	Goals	Apps	Goals	Apps	Goals	Apps	Goals
3	DF	(Vanuatu)	Brian Kaltak	21+1	0	3	0	0	0	25	0
4	MF	(Australia)	Josh Nisbet	23+2	2	3	0	0	0	28	2
5	DF	(New Zealand)	James McGarry	11	2	3	1	0	0	14	3
6	MF	(Australia)	Max Balard	20+3	0	3	0	1	0	27	0
7	FW	(Australia)	Samuel Silvera	21+5	6	3	2	0	0	29	8
9	FW	(Australia)	Jason Cummings	24+1	16	3	4	0+1	1	29	21
10	FW	(Brazil)	Moresche	0+8	0	0+3	1	0	0	11	1
11	FW	(France)	Béni Nkololo	21+2	7	3	1	1	1	27	9
13	MF	(Australia)	Harrison Steele	9+12	1	0+3	0	1	0	25	1
14	FW	(Australia)	Dylan Wenzel-Halls	0+3	1	0	0	0	0	3	1
15	DF	(New Zealand)	Storm Roux	21+2	0	3	0	0+1	0	27	0
18	DF	(Australia)	Jacob Farrell	14+8	2	0+3	0	1	0	26	2
20	GK	(Australia)	Danny Vukovic	26	0	3	0	0	0	29	0
22	DF	(Australia)	Cameron Windust	2+5	0	0	0	0+1	0	8	0
23	DF	(Fiji)	Dan Hall	9+7	1	0+3	0	1	0	20	1
24	GK	(Australia)	Yaren Sözer	0	0	0	0	1	0	1	0
25	DF	(Australia)	Nectarios Triantis	18+4	0	3	0	1	0	26	0
26	MF	(Malaysia)	Brad Tapp	0	0	0	0	0+1	0	1	0
27	DF	(Australia)	Sasha Kuzevski	0+8	0	0	0	0	0	8	0
28	MF	(Australia)	James Bayliss	0+6	0	0	0	0	0	6	0
31	FW	(Australia)	Christian Theoharous	2+12	0	0+3	0	0	0	17	0
36	MF	(Australia)	Maksim Kasalovic	0	0	0	0	0+1	0	1	0
39	MF	(Australia)	Miguel Di Pizio	0+1	0	0	0	0	0	1	0
41	FW	(Australia)	Nicholas Duarte	0+2	0	0	0	0	0	2	0
42	DF	(New Zealand)	Zac Zoricich	0+1	0	0	0	0	0	1	0
47	FW	(Australia)	Olayinka Sunmola	0+1	0	0	0	0	0	1	0
90	FW	(Ghana)	Paul Ayongo	6+3	1	0	0	1	0	10	1
98	FW	(Brazil)	Marco Túlio	23+3	9	3	1	0	0	29	10
Player(s) transferred out but featured this season
2	DF	(Australia)	Thomas Aquilina	7+5	0	0	0	1	0	13	0
14	FW	(Australia)	Garang Kuol	3+6	2	0	0	1	0	10	2
17	DF	(Nigeria)	Kelechi John	2+1	0	0	0	0	0	3	0
21	FW	(Australia)	Michael Ruhs	3+12	2	0	0	1	1	16	3
29	FW	(Australia)	Dor Jok	0+2	0	0	0	0+1	0	3	0

=== Disciplinary record ===
Includes all competitions. The list is sorted by squad number when total cards are equal. Players with no cards not included in the list.

As of 3 June 2023

Rank	No.	Pos.	Nat.	Player	A-League Men			A-League Men Finals Series			Australia Cup			Total		
Rank	No.	Pos.	Nat.	Player	Booked	(yellow card) (yellow-red card)	Sent off (straight red)	Booked	(yellow card) (yellow-red card)	Sent off (straight red)	Booked	(yellow card) (yellow-red card)	Sent off (straight red)	Booked	(yellow card) (yellow-red card)	Sent off (straight red)
1	3	DF	(Vanuatu)	Brian Kaltak	5	0	3	0	0	0	0	0	0	5	0	3
2	11	FW	(France)	Béni Nkololo	6	0	1	1	0	0	1	0	0	8	0	1
3	10	FW	(Brazil)	Moresche	0	0	1	1	0	0	0	0	0	1	0	1
4	23	DF	(Fiji)	Dan Hall	1	0	0	0	0	0	0	1	0	1	1	0
5	25	DF	(Australia)	Nectarios Triantis	7	0	0	3	0	0	0	0	0	10	0	0
6	18	DF	(Australia)	Jacob Farrell	6	0	0	1	0	0	1	0	0	8	0	0
7	98	FW	(Brazil)	Marco Túlio	4	0	0	0	0	0	0	0	0	4	0	0
8	7	FW	(Australia)	Samuel Silvera	4	0	0	0	0	0	0	0	0	4	0	0
8	13	MF	(Australia)	Harrison Steele	4	0	0	0	0	0	0	0	0	4	0	0
10	5	DF	(New Zealand)	James McGarry	3	0	0	0	0	0	0	0	0	3	0	0
10	15	DF	(New Zealand)	Storm Roux	3	0	0	0	0	0	0	0	0	3	0	0
10	20	GK	(Australia)	Danny Vukovic	3	0	0	0	0	0	0	0	0	3	0	0
13	9	FW	(Australia)	Jason Cummings	2	0	0	0	0	0	0	0	0	2	0	0
13	22	DF	(Australia)	Cameron Windust	2	0	0	0	0	0	0	0	0	2	0	0
13	31	FW	(Australia)	Christian Theoharous	1	0	0	1	0	0	0	0	0	2	0	0
16	6	MF	(Australia)	Max Balard	1	0	0	0	0	0	0	0	0	1	0	0
16	14	FW	(Australia)	Dylan Wenzel-Halls	1	0	0	0	0	0	0	0	0	1	0	0
16	90	FW	(Ghana)	Paul Ayongo	1	0	0	0	0	0	0	0	0	1	0	0
Player(s) transferred out but featured this season
1	14	FW	(Australia)	Garang Kuol	3	0	0	0	0	0	0	0	0	3	0	0
2	17	DF	(Nigeria)	Kelechi John	2	0	0	0	0	0	0	0	0	2	0	0
2	21	FW	(Australia)	Michael Ruhs	2	0	0	0	0	0	0	0	0	2	0	0
Total					62	0	5	3	0	0	3	1	0	68	1	5

=== Clean sheets ===
Includes all competitions. The list is sorted by squad number when total clean sheets are equal. Numbers in parentheses represent games where both goalkeepers participated and both kept a clean sheet; the number in parentheses is awarded to the goalkeeper who was substituted on, whilst a full clean sheet is awarded to the goalkeeper who was on the field at the start and end of play. Goalkeepers with no clean sheets not included in the list.

As of 3 June 2023

Rank	No.	Nat.	Goalkeeper	A-League Men	A-League Men Finals Series	Australia Cup	Total
1	20	(Australia)	Danny Vukovic	4	1	0	5
Total				4	0	0	4

== See also ==
- 2022–23 in Australian soccer
- List of Central Coast Mariners FC seasons
