= List of Central Coast Mariners FC records and statistics =

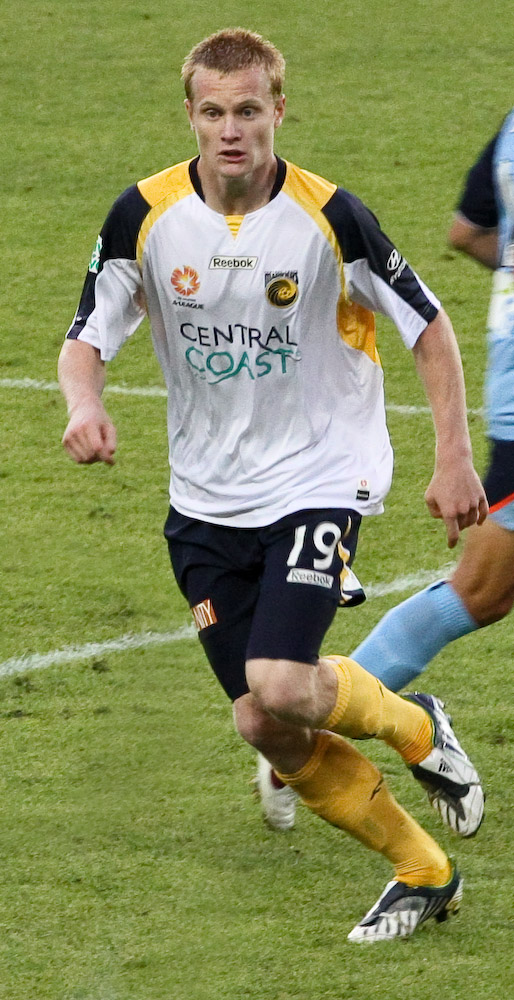
Matt Simon is the Central Coast Mariners' record goalscorer.

Central Coast Mariners Football Club is an Australian professional association football club based in Tuggerah, Gosford. The club was formed in 2005 and is one of the founding members of the A-League Men. The club has participated in every A-League Men season from its inception.

The list encompasses the honours won by Central Coast, records set by the club, their managers and their players. The player records section itemises the club's leading goalscorers and those who have made most appearances in first-team competitions. It also records notable achievements by Mariners players on the international stage, and the highest transfer fees paid and received by the club. Attendance records at Central Coast Stadium, the club's home ground since its formation, and other temporary home grounds, are also included.

Central Coast Mariners have won four top-flight titles. The club's record appearance maker is John Hutchinson, who made 271 appearances between 2005 and 2015. Matt Simon is Central Coast Mariners' record goalscorer, scoring 66 goals in total.

All figures are correct as of the match played on 2 April 2024.

== Honours and achievements ==
The Mariners' first ever silverware was won shortly after their foundation, in the 2005 A-League Pre-Season Challenge Cup. They next won the A-League Premiership in 2007–08, which they won again in 2011–12, and later in 2023–24. Their first A-League Championship was won in 2013, which they won again ten years later in 2023. In 2024, they have won their first continental title after being crowned as the 2023–24 AFC Cup champions.

Best performances in competitions entered
Competition	Best result	Championship	Runners-up
A-League Men Regular Season	Winners	3	3
A-League Men Finals	Winners	3	3
Australia Cup	Runners-up	0	1
A-League Pre-Season Challenge Cup	Winners	1	1
AFC Champions League	Round of 16	0	0
AFC Cup	Winners	1	0
OFC Champions League	Australian Qualifying Final	0	0

=== Continental ===
- AFC Cup
  - Winners (1) : 2023–24

=== Domestic ===
- A-League Men Premiership
  - Winners (3) : 2007–08, 2011–12, 2023-24
  - Runners-up (3): 2010–11, 2012–13, 2022–23
- A-League Men Championship
  - Winners (2) : 2013, 2023, 2024
  - Runners-up (3): 2006, 2008, 2011
- Australia Cup
  - Runners-up (1): 2021
- A-League Pre-Season Challenge Cup
  - Winners (1): 2005
  - Runners-up (1): 2006

== Player records ==
All current players are in bold

=== Appearances ===
- Most A-League Men appearances: John Hutchinson, 228
- Most national cup appearances: **Storm Roux**, 10
- Most Asian appearances: John Hutchinson, 24
- Youngest first-team player: Haine Eames, 16 years, 234 days (against Melbourne Victory, A-League Men, 18 October 2024)
- Oldest first-team player: Danny Vukovic, 39 years, 59 days (against Melbourne Victory, A-League Men Grand Final, 25 May 2024)
- Most consecutive appearances: Alex Wilkinson, 107 (from 4 November 2007 to 13 March 2011)
- Most separate spells with the club: Matt Simon, 3 (2006–12; 2013–15 and 2018–22), and Oliver Bozanic, 3 (2005; 2010–13 and 2020–22)

==== Most appearances ====
Competitive matches only, includes appearances as substitute. Numbers in brackets indicate goals scored.

#	Name	Years	A-League Men		National Cup^{a}	Asia	Other^{b}	Total
#	Name	Years	Regular season	Finals series	National Cup^{a}	Asia	Other^{b}	Total
1	(Malta) John Hutchinson	2005–2015	213 (18)	15 (0)	16 (0)	24 (0)	3 (0)	**271** (18)
2	(New Zealand) **Storm Roux**	2013–2018; 2021–	212 (4)	9 (1)	10 (0)	26 (1)	0 (0)	**257** (6)
3	(Australia) Matt Simon	2006–2012; 2013–2015; 2018–2022	211 (61)	10 (0)	8 (3)	9 (2)	0 (0)	**238** (66)
4	(Australia) Josh Rose	2010–2016; 2017–2018	172 (8)	11 (0)	5 (1)	18 (1)	0 (0)	**206** (10)
4	(Australia) Alex Wilkinson	2005–2012	156 (2)	16 (0)	19 (1)	12 (0)	3 (0)	**206** (3)
6	(Australia) Danny Vukovic	2005–2010; 2022–2024	148 (0)	15 (0)	12 (0)	18 (0)	0 (0)	**193** (0)
7	(New Zealand) Michael McGlinchey	2009–2014; 2018–2020	139 (10)	9 (0)	2 (2)	13 (2)	0 (0)	**163** (14)
8	(Australia) Adam Kwasnik	2005–2008; 2009–2014	122 (30)	14 (5)	13 (5)	9 (3)	0 (0)	**158** (43)
9	(Australia) Josh Nisbet	2018–2024	116 (5)	8 (1)	8 (0)	13 (1)	0 (0)	**145** (7)
10	(Australia) Pedj Bojic	2008–2013	116 (7)	9 (0)	1 (0)	14 (1)	0 (0)	**140** (8)

a. Includes the A-League Pre-Season Challenge Cup and Australia Cup
b. Includes goals and appearances (including those as a substitute) in the 2005 Australian Club World Championship Qualifying Tournament.

=== Goalscorers ===
- Most A-League Men goals: Matt Simon, 61
- Most Australia Cup goals: Matt Sim, 5
- Most Asian goals: Marco Túlio, 8
- Most goals in a season: **21** – Jason Cummings, 2022–23
- Most league goals in a season: **17** – Daniel McBreen, A-League, 2012–13
- Most goals in a match: **4** – Matt Sim v Palm Beach, 14 October 2014
- Most goals in a league match: **3**

Daniel McBreen v Sydney FC, 3 November 2012
Michael McGlinchey v Melbourne Victory, 23 February 2013
Angel Torres v Melbourne City, 17 December 2023

- Goals in most consecutive matches: **4**

John Aloisi, 9 December 2007 – 31 December 2007
Matt Simon, 12 January 2011 – 31 January 2011

- Fastest league goal: **14 seconds** – Matt Simon v North Queensland Fury, 11 October 2009
- Fastest hat-trick: **18 minutes** – Matt Sim v Palm Beach, 14 October 2014
- Fastest league hat-trick: **28 minutes** – Daniel McBreen v Sydney FC, 3 November 2012
- Youngest goalscorer: Garang Kuol – 17 years, 98 days (against APIA Leichhardt, FFA Cup, 21 December 2021)
- Oldest goalscorer: Patrick Zwaanswijk – 38 years, 94 days (against Western Sydney Wanderers, A-League Grand Final, 21 April 2013)

==== Top goalscorers ====
Competitive matches only, includes appearances as substitute. Numbers in brackets indicate goals scored.

#	Name	Years	A-League Men		National Cup^{a}	Asia	Other^{b}	Total
#	Name	Years	Regular season	Finals series	National Cup^{a}	Asia	Other^{b}	Total
1	(Australia) Matt Simon	2006–2012; 2013–2015; 2018–2022	61 (211)	0 (10)	3 (8)	2 (9)	0 (0)	**66** (238)
2	(Australia) Adam Kwasnik	2005–2008; 2009–2014	30 (122)	5 (14)	5 (13)	3 (9)	0 (0)	**43** (158)
3	(Australia) Jason Cummings	2022–2023	26 (45)	4 (4)	1 (1)	0 (0)	0 (0)	**31** (50)
4	(Australia) Daniel McBreen	2010–2014	26 (87)	2 (8)	0 (0)	2 (11)	0 (0)	**30** (106)
5	(Brazil) Marco Túlio	2022–2024	14 (37)	1 (3)	1 (1)	8 (6)	0 (0)	**24** (47)
6	(Australia) Alou Kuol	2020–2021; 2023–2025	17 (83)	2 (3)	4 (17)	0 (0)	**23** (103)	
7	(Australia) Bernie Ibini-Isei	2010–2013; 2013–2014	20 (68)	1 (9)	0 (0)	0 (19)	0 (0)	**21** (96)
8	(Australia) Nik Mrdja	2005–2011	11 (46)	1 (2)	5 (13)	0 (3)	3 (3)	**20** (67)
9	(Republic of Ireland) Roy O'Donovan	2015–2017	19 (45)	0 (0)	0 (2)	0 (0)	0 (0)	**19** (47)
10	(Malta) John Hutchinson	2005–2015	18 (213)	0 (15)	0 (16)	0 (24)	0 (3)	**18** (271)

a. Includes the A-League Pre-Season Challenge Cup and Australia Cup
b. Includes goals and appearances (including those as a substitute) in the 2005 Australian Club World Championship Qualifying Tournament.

=== Award winners ===
Joe Marston Medal

The following players have won the Joe Marston Medal while playing for Central Coast Mariners:

Year	Player	Opponent
2011	(Australia) Mat Ryan	Brisbane Roar
2013	(Australia) Daniel McBreen	Western Sydney Wanderers
2023	(Australia) Jason Cummings	Melbourne City
2024	(England) Ryan Edmondson	Melbourne Victory

Harry Kewell Medal

The following players have won the Harry Kewell Medal while playing for Central Coast Mariners:

- (Australia) Mat Ryan – 2011–12

Young Footballer of the Year

The following players have won the A-League Men Young Footballer of the Year award while playing for Central Coast Mariners:

- (Australia) Mat Ryan – 2010–11
- (Australia) Mat Ryan – 2011–12

Golden Boot

The following players have won the Golden Boot while playing for Central Coast Mariners:

- (Australia) Stewart Petrie – 2005–06
- (Australia) Daniel McBreen – 2012–13

=== International ===
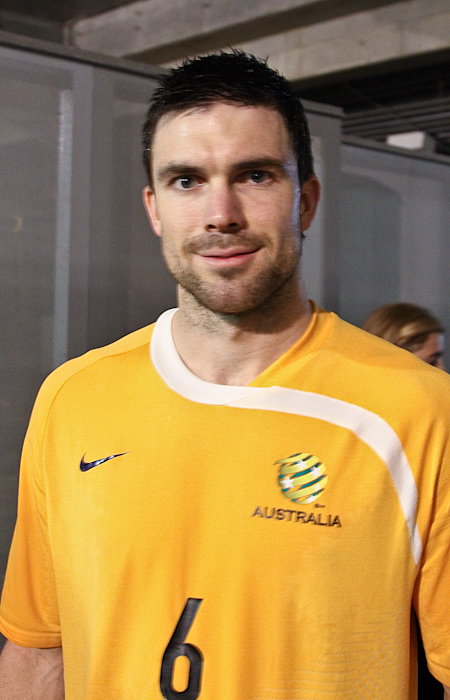
Michael Beauchamp was the first Central Coast Mariners player to receive an international cap.

This section refers to caps won while a Central Coast Mariners FC player.

- First capped player: Michael Beauchamp, for Australia against Bahrain on 23 February 2006)
- Most capped player: Michael McGlinchey with 27 caps.
- Most capped player for Australia: Mitchell Duke and Tom Rogic with 4 caps.
- First player to play in the World Cup finals: Michael Beauchamp

=== Transfers ===
==== Record transfer fees received ====
#	Fee	Paid by	For	Date	Notes	Ref
1	$1.3m	Guangzhou R&F	Rostyn Griffiths	29 February 2012		
2	$960k	Middlesbrough	Samuel Silvera	7 July 2023		
3	$800k	Gençlerbirliği	Mile Jedinak	25 December 2008		
4	$750k	Celtic	Tom Rogic	9 January 2013		
5	$600k	Shanghai Dongya	Bernie Ibini-Isei	4 June 2013		
6	$450k	Jeonbuk Hyundai Motors	Alex Wilkinson	17 July 2012		

== Club records ==
=== Matches ===
==== Firsts ====
- First match: Central Coast Mariners 3–0 Gladesville Spirit, friendly, 30 March 2005
- First A-League Men match: Perth Glory 0–1 Central Coast Mariners, 26 August 2005
- First national cup match: Central Coast Mariners 3–1 Queensland Roar, A-League Pre-Season Challenge Cup group stage, 23 July 2005
- First Asian match: Central Coast Mariners 0–0 Pohang Steelers, AFC Champions League group stage, 11 September 2009
- First match at Gosford: Central Coast Mariners 0–0 (4–2 pen.) Newcastle Jets, Oceania Club Championship qualification

==== Record wins ====
- Record A-League Men win:
  - 5–0 against Perth Glory, 30 October 2011
  - 7–2 against Sydney FC, 3 November 2012
  - 5–0 against Wellington Phoenix, 7 February 2013
  - 5–0 against Wellington Phoenix, 5 April 2022
  - 6–1 against Melbourne City, 3 June 2023
- Record national cup win: 6–0 against APIA Leichhardt, FFA Cup quarter-finals, 21 December 2021
- Record Asian win: 9–1 against Stallion Laguna, AFC Cup, 4 October 2023

==== Record defeats ====
- Record A-League Men defeat:
  - 2–8 against Newcastle Jets, 14 April 2018
  - 2–8 against Wellington Phoenix, 9 March 2019
- Record national cup defeat: 0–3 against Adelaide United, Round of 32, 1 August 2018
- Record Asian defeat: 0–5 against Kawasaki Frontale, AFC Champions League group stage, 8 April 2009

==== Record consecutive results ====
- Record consecutive wins: 7, from 13 February 2024 to 10 March 2024
- Record consecutive defeats: 11, from 19 January 2020 — 18 July 2020
- Record consecutive draws: 3, from 9 January 2010 — 22 January 2010
- Record consecutive matches without a defeat: 15, from 29 October 2011 to 21 January 2012
- Record consecutive matches without a win: 19, from 10 March 2018 to 12 January 2019
- Record consecutive wins coming from behind: 2, from 3 February 2021 to 7 February 2021
- Record consecutive matches without conceding a goal: 5
  - from 24 August 2007 to 23 September 2007
  - from 25 February 2024 to 14 March 2024
- Record consecutive matches without scoring a goal: 4
  - from 27 August 2006 to 17 September 2006
  - from 10 December 2017 to 31 December 2017

=== Goals ===
- Most league goals scored in a season: 55 in 26 matches, A-League, 2022–23
- Fewest league goals scored in a season: 22 in 21 matches, A-League, 2006–07
- Most league goals conceded in a season:
  - 70 in 27 matches, A-League, 2015–16
  - 70 in 27 matches, A-League, 2018–19
- Fewest conceded in a season: 22 in 27 matches, A-League, 2012–13

=== Points ===
- Most points in a season: 57 in 30 matches, A-League, 2010–11
- Fewest points in a season:
  - 13 in 27 matches, A-League, 2015–16
  - 13 in 27 matches, A-League, 2018–19

=== Attendances ===
- Highest home attendance: 36,354 against Newcastle Jets, 2008 A-League Grand Final, 24 February 2008
- Highest attendance at Gosford: 20,059 against Adelaide United, A-League, 20 May 2023
- Lowest attendance at Gosford: 1,820 against Bali United, AFC Cup group stage, 26 October 2023
