= Nectarios Triantis =

Greek-Australian footballer (born 2003)

Nectarios Triantis Νεκτάριος Τριάντης
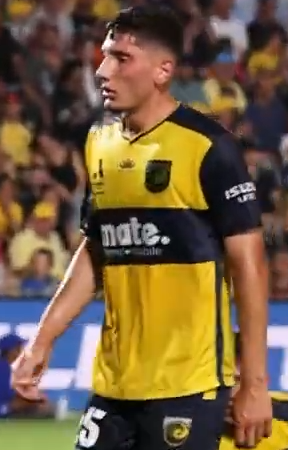
- Triantis playing for Central Coast Mariners in 2023

Personal information
- Date of birth: 11 May 2003 (age 23)
- Place of birth: Sydney, New South Wales, Australia
- Height: 1.91 m (6 ft 3 in)
- Positions: Defensive midfielder; centre-back

Team information
- Current team: Minnesota United
- Number: 25

Youth career
- 2010–2011: Canterbury Junior FC
- 2012–2014: Sydney Olympic
- 2015: FNSW NTC
- 2016–2020: Sydney FC

Senior career*
Years	Team	Apps	(Gls)
2019	Sydney FC NPL	0	(0)
2020–2022	Western Sydney Wanderers NPL	30	(5)
2021–2022	Western Sydney Wanderers	1	(0)
2022–2023	Central Coast Mariners	25	(0)
2023–2025	Sunderland	3	(0)
2024	→ Hibernian (loan)	12	(0)
2024–2025	→ Hibernian (loan)	34	(3)
2025–	Minnesota United	20	(3)

International career^{‡}
2022–2023	Australia U20	10	(1)
2023	Australia U23	4	(0)
2025–	Greece	5	(0)
- * Club domestic league appearances and goals as of 24 July 2026 ‡ National team caps and goals as of 7 June 2026

Nectarios Triantis (Greek: Νεκτάριος Τριάντης, pronounced [nekˈta.rios triˈan.tis]; born 11 May 2003) is a professional footballer who plays as a defensive midfielder for Major League Soccer club Minnesota United. Born in Australia, he plays for the Greece national team.

== Early life ==
Triantis was born in Sydney, New South Wales to Poppy Triantis, with seven brothers and three sisters. He is of Greek descent and grew up in a tight-knit Greek Orthodox household. His father, Con Triantis, died from a fire in Eastwood when he was eight. His brothers Chris and Peter were both professional soccer players in the A-League. Triantis began his soccer career at Sydney Olympic, initially as a winger and attacking midfielder, in their junior age groups.

== Club career ==
=== Western Sydney Wanderers ===
In July 2021, Western Sydney Wanderers signed Triantis to a scholarship contract. Triantis made one A-League Men appearance for the Wanderers, coming on as a late substitute in a loss to Newcastle Jets in February 2022. On 1 July 2022, the Wanderers confirmed that Triantis was one of four players departing the club following the 2021–22 season.

=== Central Coast Mariners ===
Triantis joined Central Coast Mariners' A-League Men squad on a three-year contract in July 2022.

Triantis started for the Mariners in their 6–1 win over Melbourne City in the 2023 A-League Men Grand Final.

=== Sunderland ===
On 21 June 2023, Triantis signed for English club Sunderland on a four-year contract for an initial fee of around £300,000.

=== Hibernian Football Club ===
After playing in three first-team games for Sunderland during the 2023–24 season, Triantis was loaned to Scottish Premiership club Hibernian on 1 February 2024. On 30 August 2024, he returned to Hibs on a season-long loan. He was nominated for the SFWA Footballer of the Year award in 2024–25.

=== Minnesota United ===
On 22 August 2025, Triantis joined Major League Soccer club Minnesota United FC United for an undisclosed fee. On 13 September 2025, Triantis scored a goal from inside his own half on his Minnesota debut, after having come on as a second-half substitute.

== International career ==
Triantis was selected in the Australian under-20 squad for the 2023 AFC U-20 Asian Cup in March 2023. The selection was criticised by Nick Montgomery, Triantis' coach at Central Coast Mariners, who claimed that Triantis would be better off playing senior matches for the Mariners in the 2022–23 A-League Men.

In March 2025, Triantis was called up to the full Australia team for the first time, but did not play.

On 12 August 2025, Triantis' request to switch international allegiance to Greece was approved by FIFA. Triantis made his debut for Greece on 18 November 2025, coming on as a substitute in a scoreless draw against Belarus in a 2026 FIFA World Cup qualifier.

== Career statistics ==
As of 12 April 2026

Appearances and goals by club, season and competition
Club	Season	League			National cup (Note: Includes Australia Cup, Scottish Cup)		League cup (Note: Includes EFL Cup)		Other		Total	
Club	Season	Division	Apps	Goals	Apps	Goals	Apps	Goals	Apps	Goals	Apps	Goals
Sydney FC NPL	2019	National Premier Leagues NSW	0	0	—		—		—		0	0
Western Sydney Wanderers NPL	2020	National Premier Leagues NSW	2	0	—		—		—		2	0
Western Sydney Wanderers NPL	2021	National Premier Leagues NSW 2	15	1	—		—		—		15	1
Western Sydney Wanderers NPL	2022	NSW League One	13	4	—		—		—		13	4
Western Sydney Wanderers NPL	Total		30	5	0	0	0	0	0	0	30	4
Western Sydney Wanderers	2021–22	A-League Men	1	0	0	0	—		—		1	0
Central Coast Mariners	2022–23	A-League Men	25	0	1	0	—		—		26	0
Sunderland	2023–24	Championship	2	0	0	0	1	0	0	0	3	0
Sunderland	2024–25	Championship	1	0	0	0	1	0	0	0	2	0
Sunderland	Total		3	0	0	0	1	0	0	0	5	0
Hibernian (loan)	2023–24	Scottish Premiership	12	0	2	0	0	0	0	0	14	0
Hibernian (loan)	2024–25	Scottish Premiership	34	3	2	0	0	0	0	0	36	3
Hibernian (loan)	Total		46	3	4	0	0	0	0	0	50	3
Minnesota United FC	2025	MLS	9	3	1	0	0	0	0	0	10	3
Minnesota United FC	2026	MLS	6	1	0	0	0	0	0	0	6	1
Career total			120	12	6	0	2	0	0	0	128	12

== Honours ==
Central Coast Mariners

- A-League Men Championship: 2022–23

Individual

- PFA A-League Team of the Season: 2022–23
