= Max Balard =

Australian soccer player (born 2000)

Personal information
- Full name: Maximilien Balard
- Date of birth: 20 November 2000 (age 25)
- Place of birth: Sydney, Australia
- Height: 1.78 m (5 ft 10 in)
- Position: Defensive midfielder

Team information
- Current team: NAC Breda
- Number: 16

Youth career
- Hakoah Sydney City East

Senior career*
Years	Team	Apps	(Gls)
2019–2022	CCM Academy	34	(3)
2020–2024	Central Coast Mariners	81	(3)
2024–	NAC Breda	75	(1)

International career^{‡}
2025–	Australia	5	(1)
- * Club domestic league appearances and goals as of 10 September 2025 ‡ National team caps and goals as of 23 November 2025

Maximilien Balard (born 20 November 2000) is an Australian professional soccer player who plays as a defensive midfielder for Dutch Eerste Divisie club NAC Breda and the Australia national team.

== Early life ==
Balard was born in Sydney, Australia to French parents, both of whom hailed from Annecy in Southern France and met in high school. His father was a French youth international rugby player and first came to Australia during his rehabilitation from an anterior cruciate ligament (ACL) injury.

Balard stayed in Australia until the age of three when he moved to Malaysia, and then Sri Lanka by the age of six amidst the Sri Lankan Civil War. He stayed in other countries during his childhood, namely Vietnam and Dubai in the United Arab Emirates before eventually returning to Australia.

== Club career ==
=== Central Coast Mariners ===
Having come through the Central Coast Mariners Academy after receiving a scholarship from TAG Foundation, Balard made his professional football debut in the 2020–21 season against Macarthur FC. Balard properly broke through to be a regular member of the first team in the 2021–22 season, and at the end of that season signed an extension to stay with the club until the end of the 2023–24 season.

To start the 2022–23 season, Balard captained the Mariners for the first time in a 2022 Australia Cup tie against Sydney FC, in the interim of previous captain Oliver Bozanic leaving and next captain Danny Vukovic being yet to arrive at the club. Balard was in the starting XI for the 2023 Grand Final as the Mariners won the A-League Championship with a 6–1 victory over Melbourne City at Western Sydney Stadium.

The 2023–24 season turned out to be another successful season, both individually and as a team for Balard. Balard was part of the Mariners' Championship, Premiership and AFC Cup winning 2023–24 season. Balard won the Mariners Medal as the club's best player over the season. In July 2024, the club revealed that Balard had signed a season long extension, however there was an agreement that he could leave on a free transfer should the player receive an offer from an overeas club.

=== NAC Breda ===
The same day Balard left Central Coast Mariners, it was announced that he joined Dutch club NAC Breda on a three-year contract.

== International career ==
On 8 November 2024, Balard received his first call up to the Australian national team for the FIFA World Cup 2026 Third Round Qualifiers against Saudi Arabia and Bahrain.

On 5 September 2025, Balard debuted in a friendly against New Zealand at GIO Stadium in Canberra, as the two national teams contested the Soccer Ashes. Balard came on as a substitute in the 85th minute and then scored the only goal of the match in the 87th minute.

== Personal life ==
Balard attended Freshwater Senior Campus, where he graduated with an ATAR of 94.2. He graduated from the University of New South Wales in 2023 with a double degree in Economics and Commerce after 4 years of study. Balard was on a scholarship during his studies which led him into the Elite Athlete Program, whom assisted in organising his exams at the university.

In addition to his native English, Balard also speaks French, and has learnt Spanish.

== Career statistics ==
=== Club ===
As of 22 May 2026

Appearances and goals by club, season and competition
Club	Season	League			Cup		Continental		Total	
Club	Season	Division	Apps	Goals	Apps	Goals	Apps	Goals	Apps	Goals
Central Coast Mariners Academy	2019	NPL NSW Men's 2	10	0	—		—		10	0
Central Coast Mariners Academy	2020	NPL NSW Men's 2	12	3	—		—		12	3
Central Coast Mariners Academy	2021	NPL NSW Men's 2	11	0	—		—		11	0
Central Coast Mariners Academy	Total		33	3	0	0	0	0	33	3
Central Coast Mariners	2020–21	A-League	5	0	—		—		5	0
Central Coast Mariners	2021–22	A-League Men	21	0	4	1	—		25	1
Central Coast Mariners	2022–23	A-League Men	26	0	1	0	—		27	0
Central Coast Mariners	2023–24	A-League Men	29	3	1	0	13	0	43	3
Central Coast Mariners	Total		81	3	6	1	13	0	100	4
NAC Breda	2024–25	Eredivisie	33	1	1	0	—		34	1
NAC Breda	2025–26	Eredivisie	32	0	1	0	—		33	0
NAC Breda	Total		65	1	2	0	0	0	67	1
Career total			179	7	8	1	13	0	200	8

=== International ===
Scores and results list Australia's goal tally first, score column indicates score after each Balard goal.

List of international goals scored by Max Balard
No.	Date	Venue	Opponent	Score	Result	Competition	Ref.
1	5 September 2025	GIO Stadium, Canberra, Australia	New Zealand	1–0	1–0	2025 Soccer Ashes	

== Honours ==
Central Coast Mariners

- A-League Men Championship: 2022–23, 2023–24
- A-League Men Premiership: 2023–24
- AFC Cup: 2023–24

Individual

- Mariners Medal: 2024
- Eredivisie Team of the Month: April 2025
