= 2019–20 Central Coast Mariners FC season =

Central Coast Mariners
2019–20 season
- Chairman: Michael Charlesworth
- Manager: Alen Stajcic
- Stadium: Central Coast Stadium, Gosford
- A-League: 11th
- FFA Cup: Semi-finals
- Top goalscorer: League: Milan Đurić (5 goals); All: Milan Đurić (5 goals)
- Highest home attendance: 8,910 vs. Newcastle Jets (19 October 2019); A-League
- Lowest home attendance: 3,773 vs. Wellington Phoenix (8 March 2020); A-League
- Average home league attendance: 5,504
Home colours	Away colours

The 2019–20 season was the Central Coast Mariners's 15th season since its establishment in 2004.

During the pre-season, Alen Stajcic signed a 3-year contract as the new coach.

On 24 March 2020, the FFA announced that the 2019–20 A-League season would be postponed until further notice due to the COVID-19 pandemic in Australia and New Zealand, and subsequently extended indefinitely. The season resumed on 17 July 2020.

== Players ==
=== Squad information ===
As of 15 October 2019

Note: Flags indicate national team as defined under FIFA eligibility rules; some limited exceptions apply. Players may hold more than one non-FIFA nationality.

No.	Pos.	Nation	Player
1	GK	AUS	Mark Birighitti
2	DF	SCO	Ziggy Gordon
3	DF	AUS	Jack Clisby
7	MF	SRB	Milan Đurić
8	MF	NZL	Michael McGlinchey
9	FW	AUS	Jordan Murray
10	FW	AUS	Tommy Oar
11	MF	AUS	Daniel De Silva
12	GK	AUS	Adam Pearce
15	DF	AUS	Kye Rowles
16	DF	AUS	Dylan Fox
17	MF	AUS	Samuel Silvera

No.	Pos.	Nation	Player
18	MF	NZL	Gianni Stensness
19	FW	AUS	Matt Simon
21	DF	AUS	Ruon Tongyik
22	MF	AUS	Jacob Melling
24	MF	AUS	Chris Harold
25	FW	AUS	John Roberts (Scholarship)
26	MF	AUS	Josh Nisbet (Scholarship)
27	DF	AUS	Lewis Miller (Scholarship)
29	FW	BRA	Jair
30	FW	AUS	Dylan Ruiz-Diaz (Scholarship)
44	FW	AUS	Alou Kuol (Scholarship)

== Transfers ==
=== Transfers in ===
No.	Position	Player	Transferred from	Type/fee	Contract length	Date	Ref
6	DF	Giancarlo Gallifuoco	Unattached	Free transfer	2 years	22 May 2019	
11	MF	Daniel De Silva	Sydney FC	(1 year left on contract)	Loan return	27 May 2019	
21	DF	Ruon Tongyik	Unattached	Free transfer	2 years	29 May 2019	
13	MF	(New Zealand) Jai Ingham	Unattached	Free transfer	2 years	21 June 2019	
14	FW	Abraham Majok	Unattached	Free transfer	1 year	21 June 2019	
17	MF	Samuel Silvera	Western Sydney Wanderers Youth	Scholarship	1 year	21 June 2019	
2	DF	(Scotland) Ziggy Gordon	Unattached	Free transfer	1 year	28 June 2019	
1	GK	Mark Birighitti	Melbourne City	Free transfer	1 year	1 August 2019	
4	MF	(South Korea) Kim Eun-sun	Unattached	Undisclosed	1 year	2 August 2019	
7	MF	(Serbia) Milan Đurić	Unattached	Free transfer	1 year	8 August 2019	
16	DF	Dylan Fox	Unattached	Free transfer	1 year	21 August 2019	
18	MF	(New Zealand) Gianni Stensness	Unattached	Free transfer	1 year	28 August 2019	
25	FW	John Roberts	Unattached	Scholarship		15 October 2019	
29	FW	(Brazil) Jair	Unattached	Undisclosed	1 year	18 November 2019	
24	MF	Chris Harold	Perth Glory	Free transfer	0.5 years	31 January 2020	

==== From academy squad ====
N	Pos.	Nat.	Name	Age	Notes
27	DF	(Australia)	Lewis Miller	19	scholarship contract
30	FW	(Australia)	Dylan Ruiz-Diaz	18	scholarship contract
44	FW	(Australia)	Alou Kuol	18	1.5 year scholarship contract

=== Transfers out ===
No.	Position	Player	Transferred to	Type/fee	Date	Ref
18	DF	Matthew Millar	Newcastle Jets	Free transfer	1 February 2019	
2	DF	Jonathan Aspropotamitis	Western United	Free transfer	15 April 2019	
11	FW	Connor Pain	Western United	Free transfer	15 April 2019	
28	DF	(England) Sam Graham	(England) Sheffield United	Loan return	1 May 2019	
29	MF	(Republic of Ireland) Stephen Mallon	(England) Sheffield United	Loan return	1 May 2019	
17	FW	Peter Kekeris	Unattached	Undisclosed	8 May 2019	
6	MF	(Netherlands) Tom Hiariej	Unattached	Free transfer	22 May 2019	
21	FW	Corey Gameiro	Unattached	Undisclosed	22 May 2019	
24	GK	Joe Gauci	Unattached	Free transfer	22 May 2019	
7	MF	Andrew Hoole	(Australia) Broadmeadow Magic	Free transfer	31 May 2019	
1	GK	Ben Kennedy	Unattached	Free transfer	21 June 2019	
13	MF	Aiden O'Neill	(England) Burnley	Loan return	21 June 2019	
68	MF	(Turkey) Jem Karacan	Unattached	Undisclosed	21 June 2019	
13	FW	(New Zealand) Jai Ingham	Brisbane Roar	Free transfer	1 August 2019	
6	DF	Giancarlo Gallifuoco	Unattached	Mutual contract termination	31 January 2020	
14	FW	Abraham Majok	Unattached	Mutual contract termination	17 March 2020	
23	MF	Mario Shabow	Unattached	Mutual contract termination	17 March 2020	
4	MF	(South Korea) Kim Eun-sun	Unattached	End of contract	19 June 2020	

=== Contracts extensions ===
No.	Name	Position	Duration	Date	Notes
15	Kye Rowles	Centre-back	2 years	8 May 2019	
12	Adam Pearce	Goalkeeper	2 years	9 May 2019	
17	Samuel Silvera	Attacking midfielder	3 years	8 October 2019	upgraded to senior contract
18	(New Zealand) Gianni Stensness	Defensive midfielder	2 years	9 December 2019	
27	Lewis Miller	Right-back	2 years	14 January 2020	upgraded to senior contract
26	Josh Nisbet	Midfielder	2 years	3 March 2020	upgraded to senior contract

== Technical staff ==
Position	Staff
Head coach	(Australia) Alen Stajcic
Assistant coach	(Scotland) Nick Montgomery
Goalkeeping coach	(Australia) Jess Vanstrattan
Physiotherapist	(Australia) Murray Leyland

== Pre-season ==
=== Friendlies ===
13 July 2019	Central Coast Mariners (Australia)	4–1	(Australia) Manly United	Lisarow, Australia
10:30 AEST	Simon 42'; Gallifuoco 45'; Majok 49', 59'	Report	Cholakian 10'	Stadium: Pluim Park

23 July 2019	Charlestown City Blues (Australia)	0–5	(Australia) Central Coast Mariners	Newcastle, Australia
19:00 AEST		Report	Ingham 15', 29'; 32' (o.g.); Nisbet 40'; Oar 85'	Stadium: Lisle Carr Oval

9 August 2019	Weston Workers Bears (Australia)	0–4	(Australia) Central Coast Mariners	Weston, Australia
19:00 AEST		Report	Simon 22'; Majok 32'; Murray 55', 57'	Stadium: Rockwell Automation Park

21 August 2019	Western Sydney Wanderers (Australia)	2–0	(Australia) Central Coast Mariners	Parramatta, Australia
	Schwegler 12'; Adam 25'	Report		Stadium: Bankwest Stadium; Attendance: 0 (behind closed doors)

4 September 2019	Melbourne City (Australia)	2–0	(Australia) Central Coast Mariners	Melbourne, Australia
10:30 AEST	Berenguer 37'; Najjarine 42'	Report		Stadium: City Football Academy; Attendance: 0 (behind closed doors)

8 September 2019	NPL Tasmania Select Team (Australia)	1–3	(Australia) Central Coast Mariners	Hobart, Australia
14:30 AEST	Hamlett 85'	Report	Murray 11'; Gordon 66'; McGlinchey 69'	Stadium: South Hobart Oval

10 September 2019	South Hobart (Australia)	1–4	(Australia) Central Coast Mariners	Kingston, Australia
18:30 AEST	Lakoseljac 52'	Report	Simon 29' (pen.), 48', 50'; Oar 55'	Stadium: Lightwood Park

25 September 2019	Central Coast Mariners (Australia)	7–1	(Australia) North Shore Mariners	Lisarow, Australia
19:30 AEST	Murray 19', 36'; Roberts 57', 72', 81'; McGlinchey 71', 80'	Report	Saric 60'	Stadium: Pluim Park

== Competitions ==
=== Overview ===
Competition	First match	Last match	Starting round	Final position	Record							
Competition	First match	Last match	Starting round	Final position	Pld	W	D	L	GF	GA	GD	Win %
A-League	12 October 2019	3 August 2020	Matchday 1	11th	26	5	3	18	26	55	−29	19.23
FFA Cup	31 July 2019	17 September 2019	Round of 32	Quarter-finals	3	1	1	1	4	3	+1	33.33
Total					29	6	4	19	30	58	−28	20.69

Source: Soccerway

=== FFA Cup ===
31 July 2019 Round of 32	Maitland FC (New South Wales)	0–2	(New South Wales) Central Coast Mariners	Maitland
19:30		Report	McGlinchey 8', 11'	Stadium: Maitland Sportsground; Attendance: 2,777; Referee: Stephen Laurie

28 August 2019 Round of 16	Brisbane Roar (Queensland)	2–2 (a.e.t.) (2–4 p)	(New South Wales) Central Coast Mariners	Brisbane
19:30	Inman 47'; O'Donovan 87' (pen.)	Report	Simon 21' (pen.); Silvera 85'	Stadium: Dolphin Oval; Attendance: 6,235; Referee: Alex King
	Penalties
	O'Neill (penalty scored); Gillesphey (penalty scored); O'Donovan (penalty missed); Aldred (penalty missed)		(penalty scored) Simon; (penalty scored) Stensness; (penalty scored) Đurić; (penalty scored) Melling

18 September 2019 Quarter-final	Hume City (Victoria (state))	0–1	(New South Wales) Central Coast Mariners	Melbourne
19:30		Report	Majok 90+2'	Stadium: ABD Stadium; Attendance: 1,928; Referee: Kurt Ams

2 October 2019 Semi-final	Central Coast Mariners (South Australia)	1–2	(New South Wales) Adelaide United	Gosford
19:30 AEST	Clisby 63'	Report	Blackwood 74'; McGree 90'	Stadium: Central Coast Stadium; Attendance: 5,572; Referee: Shaun Evans

=== A-League ===
==== League table ====
Pos	Team	Pld	W	D	L	GF	GA	GD	Pts	Qualification
1	Sydney FC (C)	26	16	5	5	49	25	+24	53	Qualification for 2021 AFC Champions League group stage and Finals series (Note: All Australian teams withdrew from the 2021 AFC Champions League on 4 June 2021.) (Note: The top two teams enter the Finals series at the semi-finals, while the teams ranked third to sixth enter the Finals series at the elimination-finals.)
2	Melbourne City	26	14	5	7	49	37	+12	47	Qualification for 2021 AFC Champions League qualifying play-offs and Finals series
3	Wellington Phoenix (Note: Wellington Phoenix cannot qualify for the 2021 AFC Champions League as they are not recognised as an AFC club.)	26	12	5	9	38	33	+5	41	Qualification for Finals series
4	Brisbane Roar	26	11	7	8	29	28	+1	40	Qualification for 2021 AFC Champions League qualifying play-offs and Finals series
5	Western United	26	12	3	11	46	37	+9	39	Qualification for Finals series
6	Perth Glory	26	10	7	9	43	36	+7	37	Qualification for Finals series
7	Adelaide United	26	11	3	12	44	49	−5	36	
8	Newcastle Jets	26	9	7	10	32	40	−8	34	
9	Western Sydney Wanderers	26	9	6	11	35	40	−5	33	
10	Melbourne Victory	26	6	5	15	33	44	−11	23	
11	Central Coast Mariners	26	5	3	18	26	55	−29	18	

Source: A-Leagues
Rules for classification: 1) points; 2) goal difference; 3) number of goals scored.
(C) Champions

==== Results summary ====
Overall								Home						Away					
Pld	W	D	L	GF	GA	GD	Pts	W	D	L	GF	GA	GD	W	D	L	GF	GA	GD
26	5	3	18	26	55	−29	18	3	3	7	13	25	−12	2	0	11	13	30	−17

Last updated: 27 July 2020.
Source: Ultimate A-League

==== Results by round ====
Round	1	2	3	4	5	6	7	8	9	10	11	12	13	14	15	16	17	18	19	20	21	22	23	24	29	25	28	26
Ground	A	H	B	A	A	H	H	A	B	A	H	H	A	H	A	H	H	A	A	H	A	H	A	H	N	N	N	N
Result	L	D	X	W	L	L	W	L	X	L	W	L	L	W	L	L	L	L	L	L	L	L	L	L	L	D	D	W
Position	10	8	9	6	8	10	6	10	11	11	9	9	10	10	10	10	10	10	11	11	11	11	11	11	11	11	11	11
Points	1	1	1	4	4	4	7	7	7	7	10	10	10	13	13	13	13	13	13	13	13	13	13	13	13	14	15	18

Source: worldfootball.net
A = Away; H = Home; N = Neutral; B = Bye; W = Win; D = Draw; L = Loss; X = Bye

==== Matches ====
12 October 2019 1	Western Sydney Wanderers	2–1	Central Coast Mariners	Sydney
17:00 AEDT	Duke 41', 82' (pen.)	Report	Đurić 36'	Stadium: Bankwest Stadium; Attendance: 17,091; Referee: Alireza Faghani

19 October 2019 2	Central Coast Mariners	1–1	Newcastle Jets	Gosford
19:30 AEDT	Đurić 4'	Report	D. Petratos 56' (pen.)	Stadium: Central Coast Stadium; Attendance: 8,910; Referee: Daniel Elder

3 November 2019 4	Perth Glory	1–2	Central Coast Mariners	Perth
15:00 AWST	Franjic 32'	Report	De Silva 17'; Silvera 45'	Stadium: HBF Stadium; Attendance: 8,148; Referee: Kurt Ams

8 November 2019 5	Melbourne City	3–1	Central Coast Mariners	Melbourne
19:30 AEDT	Good 17'; Luna 59'; Griffiths 82'	Report	Murray 89'	Stadium: AAMI Park; Attendance: 5,547; Referee: Stephen Lucas

16 November 2019 6	Central Coast Mariners	1–3	Adelaide United	Gosford
17:00 AEDT	Đurić 6' (pen.)	Report	Halloran 26'; Mileusnic 38'; Opseth 45'	Stadium: Central Coast Stadium; Attendance: 5,773; Referee: Kurt Ams

24 November 2019 7	Central Coast Mariners	1–0	Western United	Gosford
18:00 AEDT	Gallifuoco 49'	Report		Stadium: Central Coast Stadium; Attendance: 5,075; Referee: Alex King

30 November 2019 8	Brisbane Roar	2–0	Central Coast Mariners	Brisbane
16:00 AEST	O'Donovan 61'; Neville 66'	Report		Stadium: Suncorp Stadium; Attendance: 11,763; Referee: Ben Abraham

14 December 2019 10	Sydney FC	1–0	Central Coast Mariners	Sydney
19:30 AEDT	Barbarouses 5'	Report		Stadium: Jubilee Stadium; Attendance: 10,256; Referee: Jonathan Barreiro

22 December 2019 11	Central Coast Mariners	2–1	Adelaide United	Gosford
18:00 AEDT	Rowles 4'; Đurić 42'	Report	Halloran 46'	Stadium: Central Coast Stadium; Attendance: 4,848; Referee: Adam Fielding

31 December 2019 12	Central Coast Mariners	0–3	Perth Glory	Gosford
19:30 AEDT		Report	Castro 45+1'; Chianese 48'; Fornaroli 62'	Stadium: Central Coast Stadium; Attendance: 6,734; Referee: Ben Abraham

4 January 2020 13	Wellington Phoenix	2–1	Central Coast Mariners	Wellington
19:00 NZDT	Hooper 13'; Ball 29'	Report	DeVere 45+1' (o.g.)	Stadium: Sky Stadium; Attendance: 8,201; Referee: Jonathan Barreiro

12 January 2020 14	Central Coast Mariners	3–2	Melbourne Victory	Gosford
18:00 AEDT	Murray 44'; Simon 90+4' (pen.), 90+10' (pen.)	Report	Dobras 8'; Rowles 78' (o.g.)	Stadium: Central Coast Stadium; Attendance: 4,957; Referee: Kurt Ams

19 January 2020 15	Western United	3–0	Central Coast Mariners	Geelong
16:00 AEDT	Berisha 6', 21'; Rowles 18' (o.g.)	Report		Stadium: GMHBA Stadium; Attendance: 6,020; Referee: Jonathan Barreiro

25 January 2020 16	Central Coast Mariners	0–1	Brisbane Roar	Gosford
17:00 AEDT		Report	Brown 86'	Stadium: Central Coast Stadium; Attendance: 4,539; Referee: Adam Fielding

2 February 2020 17	Central Coast Mariners	1–3	Western Sydney Wanderers	Gosford
16:00 AEDT	Simon 82' (pen.)	Report	Muller 42'; Duke 76' (pen.); Cox 90+5'	Stadium: Central Coast Stadium; Attendance: 5,053; Referee: Shaun Evans

9 February 2020 18	Newcastle Jets	4–3	Central Coast Mariners	Newcastle
16:00 AEDT	D. Petratos 15', 52'; Topor-Stanley 25'; Kim 55' (o.g.)	Report	Tongyik 45'; Clisby 49'; Harold 86'	Stadium: McDonald Jones Stadium; Attendance: 4,151; Referee: Kurt Ams

14 February 2020 19	Adelaide United	2–0	Central Coast Mariners	Adelaide
19:20 ACDT	Blackwood 82'; M. Toure 84'	Report		Stadium: Coopers Stadium; Attendance: 7,116; Referee: Adam Kersey

23 February 2020 20	Central Coast Mariners	0–3	Sydney FC	Gosford
18:00 AEDT		Report	Ninković 8'; Tilio 89'; Van Der Saag 90'	Stadium: Central Coast Stadium; Attendance: 5,376; Referee: Chris Beath

1 March 2020 21	Western United	6–2	Central Coast Mariners	Geelong
16:00 AEDT	Berisha 9', 89'; Burgess 25', 30', 43'; Durante 61'	Report	Harold 19' (pen.); Stensness 45'	Stadium: GMHBA Stadium; Attendance: 3,629; Referee: Ben Abraham

8 March 2020 22	Central Coast Mariners	1–3	Wellington Phoenix	Gosford
16:00 AEDT	Jair 89'	Report	Cacace 18'; Hooper 30'; Sotirio 78'	Stadium: Central Coast Stadium; Attendance: 3,773; Referee: Adam Kersey

13 March 2020 23	Brisbane Roar	1–0	Central Coast Mariners	Brisbane
18:30 AEST	McDonald 45+2'	Report		Stadium: Suncorp Stadium; Attendance: 4,121; Referee: Alireza Faghani

20 March 2020 24	Central Coast Mariners	2–4	Melbourne City	Gosford
19:30 AEDT	Murray 2', 69'	Report	Maclaren 5', 48', 74'; Susaeta 10'	Stadium: Central Coast Stadium; Attendance: 0 (behind closed doors due to COVID-19 pandemic); Referee: Kurt Ams

18 July 2020 29	Perth Glory	1–0	Central Coast Mariners	Gosford
17:00 AEDT	Ingham 32'	Report		Stadium: Central Coast Stadium; Attendance: 1,717; Referee: Alex King

24 July 2020 25	Central Coast Mariners	0–0	Newcastle Jets	Gosford
19:30 AEDT		Report		Stadium: Central Coast Stadium; Attendance: 2,373; Referee: Ben Abraham

27 July 2020 28	Central Coast Mariners	1–1	Western Sydney Wanderers	Gosford
19:30 AEDT	Đurić 59'	Report	Cox 88'	Stadium: Central Coast Stadium; Attendance: 1,035; Referee: Chris Beath

3 August 2020 26	Melbourne Victory	2–3	Central Coast Mariners	Sydney
19:30 AEDT	Rojas 22', 65'	Report	Fox 48'; Ruiz-Diaz 85', 89'	Stadium: Netstrata Jubilee Oval; Attendance: 0 Referee: Tim Danaskos

== Statistics ==
=== Appearances and goals ===
Includes all competitions. Players with no appearances not included in the list.

No.	Pos	Nat	Player	Total		A-League		FFA Cup	
No.	Pos	Nat	Player	Apps	Goals	Apps	Goals	Apps	Goals
1	GK	(Australia) AUS	Mark Birighitti	29	0	26	0	3	0
2	DF	(Scotland) SCO	Ziggy Gordon	30	0	26	0	4	0
3	DF	(Australia) AUS	Jack Clisby	26	2	21+1	1	4	1
7	MF	(Serbia) SRB	Milan Đurić	26	5	18+5	5	3	0
8	MF	(Australia) AUS	Michael McGlinchey	9	2	3+5	0	1	2
9	FW	(Australia) AUS	Jordan Murray	22	4	13+5	4	2+2	0
10	MF	(Australia) AUS	Tommy Oar	24	0	18+2	0	4	0
11	FW	(Australia) AUS	Daniel De Silva	24	1	19+1	1	4	0
12	GK	(Australia) AUS	Adam Pearce	1	0	0	0	1	0
15	DF	(Australia) AUS	Kye Rowles	22	1	20	1	2	0
16	DF	(Australia) AUS	Dylan Fox	14	1	10+1	1	3	0
17	FW	(Australia) AUS	Samuel Silvera	25	2	11+10	1	3+1	1
18	DF	(Australia) AUS	Gianni Stensness	27	1	25	1	1+1	0
19	FW	(Australia) AUS	Matt Simon	25	4	4+17	3	4	1
21	DF	(Australia) AUS	Ruon Tongyik	10	1	6+3	1	1	0
22	MF	(Australia) AUS	Jacob Melling	4	0	2	0	1+1	0
24	FW	(Australia) AUS	Chris Harold	7	2	6+1	2	0	0
26	MF	(Australia) AUS	Josh Nisbet	13	0	9+3	0	0+1	0
27	DF	(Australia) AUS	Lewis Miller	18	0	15+2	0	1	0
29	FW	(Brazil) BRA	Jair	15	1	7+8	1	0	0
30	FW	(Australia) AUS	Dylan Ruiz-Diaz	6	2	1+5	2	0	0
33	FW	(Australia) AUS	Louis Khoury	1	0	0+1	0	0	0
44	FW	(Australia) AUS	Alou Kuol	4	0	1+3	0	0	0
	MF	(Australia) AUS	Mark Moric	1	0	0+1	0	0	0
Player(s) transferred out but featured this season
4	MF	(South Korea) KOR	Kim Eun-sun	21	0	16+4	0	1	0
6	DF	(Australia) AUS	Giancarlo Gallifuoco	11	1	9+1	1	1	0
14	FW	(South Sudan) SSD	Abraham Majok	4	1	0+2	0	0+2	1

=== Disciplinary record ===
Includes all competitions. The list is sorted by squad number when total cards are equal. Players with no cards not included in the list.

No.	Pos	Nat	Player	Total			A-League			FFA Cup		
No.	Pos	Nat	Player	Yellow card	Second yellow card	Red card	Yellow card	Second yellow card	Red card	Yellow card	Second yellow card	Red card
19	FW	(Australia) AUS	Matt Simon	5	1	0	4	0	0	1	1	0
10	MF	(Australia) AUS	Tommy Oar	6	0	0	5	0	0	1	0	0
18	DF	(Australia) AUS	Gianni Stensness	5	0	0	5	0	0	0	0	0
2	DF	(Scotland) SCO	Ziggy Gordon	5	0	0	4	0	0	1	0	0
3	DF	(Australia) AUS	Jack Clisby	4	0	0	3	0	0	1	0	0
27	DF	(Australia) AUS	Lewis Miller	4	0	0	4	0	0	0	0	0
4	MF	(South Korea) KOR	Kim Eun-sun	3	0	0	3	0	0	0	0	0
6	DF	(Australia) AUS	Giancarlo Gallifuoco	3	0	0	3	0	0	0	0	0
7	MF	(Serbia) SRB	Milan Đurić	3	0	0	2	0	0	1	0	0
15	DF	(Australia) AUS	Kye Rowles	3	0	0	3	0	0	0	0	0
1	GK	(Australia) AUS	Mark Birighitti	2	0	0	2	0	0	0	0	0
9	FW	(Australia) AUS	Jordan Murray	2	0	0	2	0	0	0	0	0
16	DF	(Australia) AUS	Dylan Fox	2	0	0	1	0	0	1	0	0
11	FW	(Australia) AUS	Daniel De Silva	1	0	0	1	0	0	0	0	0
14	FW	(South Sudan) SSD	Ayom Majok	1	0	0	0	0	0	1	0	0
17	FW	(Australia) AUS	Samuel Silvera	1	0	0	1	0	0	0	0	0
26	MF	(Australia) AUS	Josh Nisbet	1	0	0	1	0	0	0	0	0

- (yellow card) = Number of bookings; (second yellow card) = Number of sending offs after a second yellow card; (red card) = Number of sending offs by a direct red card.

=== Clean sheets ===
Includes all competitions. The list is sorted by squad number when total clean sheets are equal. Numbers in parentheses represent games where both goalkeepers participated and both kept a clean sheet; the number in parentheses is awarded to the goalkeeper who was substituted on, whilst a full clean sheet is awarded to the goalkeeper who was on the field at the start of play. Goalkeepers with no clean sheets not included in the list.

Rank	No.	Nat.	Goalkeeper	A-League	FFA Cup	Total
1	1	(Australia)	Mark Birighitti	2	1	3
2	12	(Australia)	Adam Pearce	0	1	1
Total				2	2	4
