= Josh Nisbet =

Australian soccer player (born 1999)

- Nisbet playing for Central Coast Mariners in 2020

Personal information
- Full name: Joshua Jeffrey Nisbet
- Date of birth: 15 June 1999 (age 27)
- Place of birth: Penrith, New South Wales, Australia
- Height: 1.60 m (5 ft 3 in)
- Position: Midfielder

Team information
- Current team: Roda JC
- Number: 4

Youth career
- St Marys FC
- Sunshine Coast
- 2017–2018: CCM Academy

Senior career*
Years	Team	Apps	(Gls)
2017–2019	CCM Academy	45	(0)
2018–2024	Central Coast Mariners	124	(6)
2024–2025	Ross County	36	(3)
2025–	Roda JC	37	(3)

International career^{‡}
2022	Australia U23	3	(0)
2024–	Australia	3	(0)
- * Club domestic league appearances and goals as of 25 April 2026 ‡ National team caps and goals as of 11 September 2026

Joshua Nisbet (born 15 June 1999) is an Australian professional soccer player who plays for Roda JC and the Australia national team. He can play in several positions including defensive midfield, winger, attacking midfield or as a forward.

== Early life ==
Nisbet was born on 15 June 1999 in Penrith, New South Wales, Australia. The son of Dave, he has an older brother. At a young age, he moved with his family to the Sunshine Coast, Australia. Growing up, he suffered from Langerhans cell histiocytosis.

== Club career ==
=== Central Coast Mariners ===
As a youth player, Nisbet joined the youth academy of Australian side Central Coast Mariners, where he worked Woolworths while playing for the club's youth academy. Nisbet made his professional debut for the Central Coast Mariners on 1 August 2018 in a FFA Cup match against Adelaide United, starting the game before being replaced at the second-half by Peter Kekeris. He made his first league appearance for the Mariners as a second-half substitute in a Round 15 clash against Newcastle Jets in the F3 Derby, the Mariners going on to lose the game 1–0. On 30 January 2019, he signed his maiden professional contract with the Central Coast. In the 2020–21 season, Nisbet started 24 times and provided 3 assists. In the 2021–22 season, Josh Nisbet played 25 matches and scored 1 goal. In June 2022 he signed a new contract for an additional 2 years.

Nisbet won the Mariners Medal for the 2022-23 season, as their best player of the year. Nisbet was part of the Championship winning Mariners team in that same season.

The following season, Nisbet made his 100th league appearance for the club on 3 December 2023, in a home match against Melbourne Victory. Nisbet was part of the Mariners' Championship, Premiership and AFC Cup winning 2023-24 season. He also won the Johnny Warren Medal as the best player in the A-League Men campaign. On 9 July 2024, it was announced that Nisbet would leave the club after turning down an offer to extend his contract; he made 145 appearances for the club, making him the Mariners' ninth most-capped player of all time at the time of his departure.

=== Ross County ===
On 22 August 2024, it was announced that Nisbet had signed for Scottish club Ross County.

Nisbet scored his first goal for Ross County on the 23rd of November 2024.

=== Roda JC ===
On 5 June 2025, Roda JC signed Nisbet on a two-year deal. He was regarded to have established himself as a regular starter while playing for the club.

== International career ==
Nisbet was called up to the Australian under-23 team for the 2022 AFC U-23 Asian Cup in June 2022.

In March 2024, Nisbet was called up to the Australia squad for the first time, as a replacement for the injured Lewis Miller for 2026 FIFA World Cup qualifying matches against Lebanon. Nisbet made his debut in the second match against Lebanon in Canberra, coming off the bench at Canberra Stadium in the 67th minute.

== Style of play ==
Nisbet plays as a midfielder. He is known for his versatility.

== Career statistics ==
=== Club ===
As of 12 May 2026

Appearances and goals by club, season and competition
Club	Season	League			National cup (Note: Includes Australia Cup, Scottish Cup)		League cup		Other		Total	
Club	Season	Division	Apps	Goals	Apps	Goals	Apps	Goals	Apps	Goals	Apps	Goals
Central Coast Mariners Academy	2017	NPL NSW 2	5	0	–		–		–		5	0
Central Coast Mariners Academy	2018	NPL NSW 2	25	0	–		–		–		25	0
Central Coast Mariners Academy	2019	NPL NSW 2	15	0	–		–		–		15	0
Central Coast Mariners Academy	Total		45	0	0	0	0	0	0	0	45	0
Central Coast Mariners	2018–19	A-League	4	0	1	0	–		–		5	0
Central Coast Mariners	2019–20	A-League	12	0	1	0	–		–		13	0
Central Coast Mariners	2020–21	A-League	25	0	0	0	–		–		25	0
Central Coast Mariners	2021–22	A-League Men	25	1	5	0	–		–		30	1
Central Coast Mariners	2022–23	A-League Men	28	2	0	0	–		–		28	2
Central Coast Mariners	2023–24	A-League Men	30	3	1	0	–		14 (Note: Appearances in AFC Cup)	1	44	4
Central Coast Mariners	Total		124	6	8	0	0	0	13	1	145	7
Ross County	2024–25	Scottish Premiership	36	3	1	0	0	0	2 (Note: Appearances in Scottish Premiership play-offs)	1	39	4
Roda JC	2025–26	Eerste Divisie	37	3	2	0	–		2 (Note: Appearances in Eerste Divisie play-offs)	0	41	3
Career total			242	12	11	0	0	0	17	2	270	14

== Honours ==
Central Coast Mariners

- A-League Men Championship: 2022–23, 2023–24
- A-League Men Premiership: 2023–24
- AFC Cup: 2023–24

Individual

- Johnny Warren Medal: 2023–24
- Mariners Medal: 2022–23
- PFA A–League Men Team of the Season: 2022–23, 2023–24
