= Samuel Silvera =

Australian soccer player (born 2000)

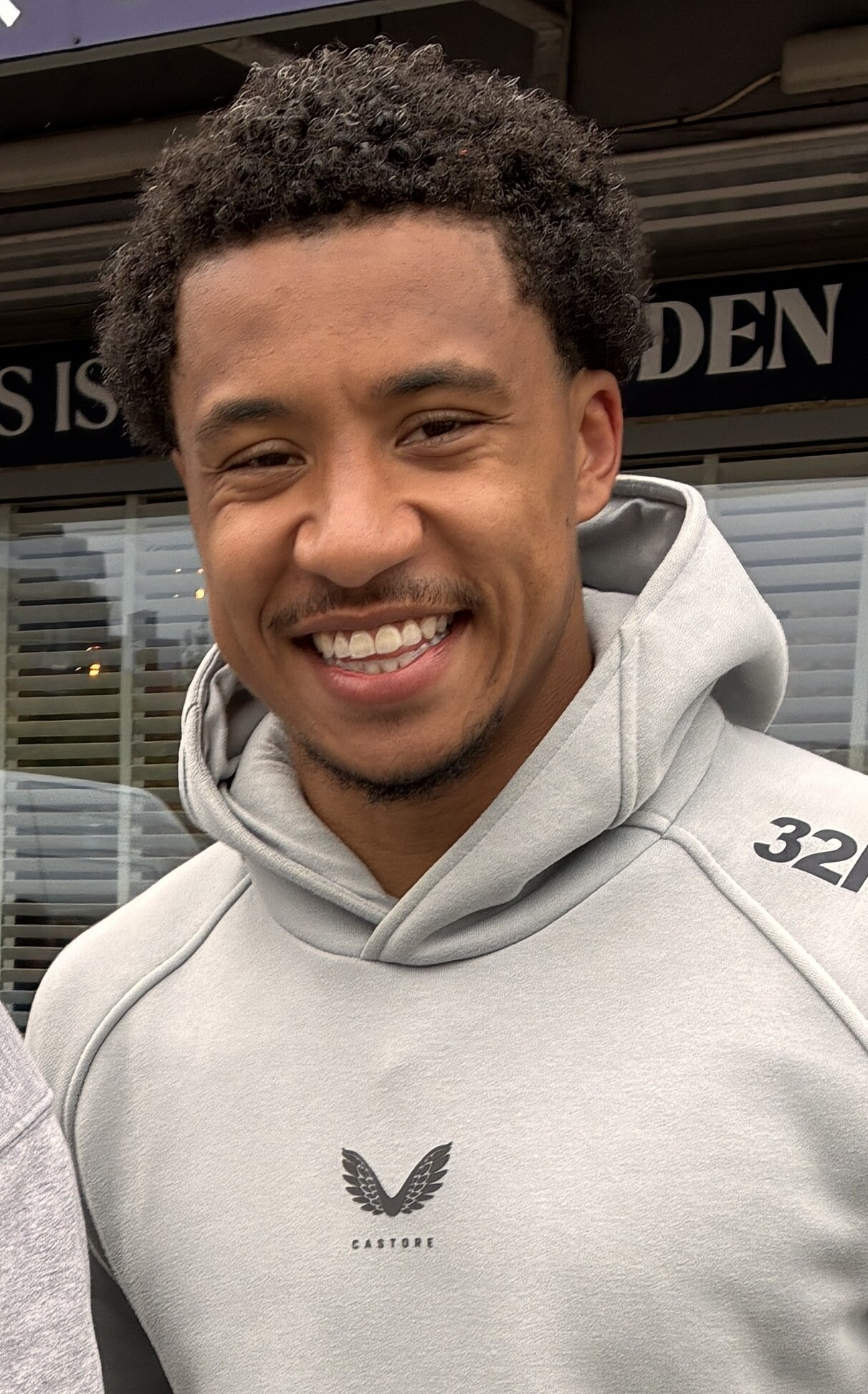
- Samuel Silvera in 2025.

Personal information
- Full name: Samuel Miles Silvera
- Date of birth: 25 October 2000 (age 26)
- Place of birth: Lambeth, England
- Height: 1.73 m (5 ft 8 in)
- Position: Winger

Team information
- Current team: Milton Keynes Dons
- Number: 17

Youth career
- 2014–2015: FNSW NTC
- 2016: Blacktown City

Senior career*
Years	Team	Apps	(Gls)
2017–2019	Western Sydney Wanderers NPL	30	(4)
2019–2020	Central Coast Mariners	21	(1)
2020–2022	Paços de Ferreira	0	(0)
2020–2021	→ Casa Pia (loan)	4	(0)
2021	→ Sanjoanense (loan)	11	(1)
2021–2022	→ Newcastle Jets (loan)	19	(1)
2022–2023	Central Coast Mariners	29	(8)
2023–2026	Middlesbrough	59	(6)
2024–2025	→ Portsmouth (loan)	11	(0)
2025	→ Blackpool (loan)	15	(1)
2026–	Milton Keynes Dons	0	(0)

International career^{‡}
2019	Australia U23	1	(0)
2023–	Australia	8	(0)
- * Club domestic league appearances and goals as of 30 May 2026 ‡ National team caps and goals as of 5 September 2025

Samuel Miles Silvera (born 25 October 2000) is a professional football player who plays as a winger for EFL League One club Milton Keynes Dons. Born in England, he represents the Australia national team.

== Early life ==
Born in London, Silvera grew up and started his soccer career in Australia. He is of Jamaican descent through his father. He holds dual citizenship with Australia and the United Kingdom.

== Club career ==
=== Western Sydney Wanderers (NPL) ===
In 2017 while competing in the U20s NPL NSW 2 for Western Sydney Wanderers, Silvera was honoured as the Wanderers U20 Player of the Year.

=== Central Coast Mariners ===
Silvera left the Wanderers at the end of the 2018/19 season to take up a one-year scholarship from the TAG Foundation with the Central Coast Mariners after an initial trial period with the club. On 31 July 2019, Silvera made his professional debut in a Round of 32 FFA Cup clash against Maitland, playing the full 90 minutes and providing an assist for Michael McGlinchey's second goal. He scored his first professional goal in Central Coast's 2–2 draw with Brisbane Roar in the Round of 16 of the FFA Cup on 28 August 2019, scoring their second goal as they went on to win the game 4–2 on penalties. Following an encouraging pre-season, Silvera agreed to a new three-year deal with the Mariners, tying him to the club until 2022. He went on trial with Los Angeles FC of Major League Soccer at the start of the 2020 season.

=== Paços de Ferreira ===
On 4 September 2020, Silvera signed for Primeira Liga club Paços de Ferreira for an undisclosed fee. Soon after signing, Silvera was loaned to LigaPro side Casa Pia ahead of the 2020–21 season. Silvera played four games at Casa Pia, before then joining Sanjoanense on loan in February 2021 to complete that season.

Ahead of the 2021–22 season, Silvera joined the Newcastle Jets on loan. His decision to sign for Newcastle was a controversial one, given the deep and long-standing rivalry with his former club, Central Coast Mariners. Silvera made 21 appearances for Newcastle during his season-long loan, scoring 1 goal.

=== Return to Central Coast Mariners ===
After controversially spending the previous season on loan with rivals Newcastle, Silvera returned to the Central Coast Mariners for the 2022–23 season on a three-year contract. Silvera scored in his first game back for the club against Wellington Phoenix. Silvera was part of the A-League Men Championship winning team for the Mariners in his first season back at the club, scoring one of six Mariners goals in the Grand Final and setting up another with a trivela.

=== Middlesbrough ===
On 7 July 2023, Silvera signed for English Championship club Middlesbrough for an undisclosed fee on a three-year deal.

On 5 August 2023, Silvera made his debut for the club, coming on as a 69th minute substitute in a 1–0 defeat to Millwall on the opening weekend of the 2023–24 Championship season.

Silvera scored his first goal for Middlesbrough on his first start for the club, scoring in a 3-2 EFL Cup win against Huddersfield Town on 8 August. Silvera scored his first league goal for the club in a 2–1 win against Norwich City on 24 October 2023.

==== Portsmouth loan ====
On 1 July 2024, Silvera signed for newly-promoted Championship side Portsmouth on a season-long loan. He was recalled by Middlesbrough on 13 January 2025.

==== Blackpool loan ====
On 13 January 2025, Silvera joined EFL League One side Blackpool on loan for the remainder of the season.

Return to Middlesbrough

Silvera was heavily included in Middlesbrough’s Pre-Season going into the 2024–25 EFL Championship under new manager Rob Edwards. He played at a Left-Wing Back Role instead of his usual Left Winger position.

Silvera scored his first goal of the season and first goal under new manager Kim Hellberg on 4 January 2026 against Southampton after getting on the end of Luke Ayling’s long ball dribbling it in the box and putting it in the bottom left corner to make it 2–0, which Boro ended up winning 4–0. In the next league game against West Bromwich Albion Silvera scored to make it 2–0 in the 58th minute of the match. Silvera would assist Delano Burgzorg in the 90th minute to win the game 3–2.

On 28 May 2026, Middlesbrough announced they would be releasing Silvera.

=== Milton Keynes Dons ===
On 31 July 2026, Silvera joined EFL League One club Milton Keynes Dons on a free transfer. He made his debut on 8 August 2026 as a 56th-minute substitute in a 4–1 EFL Cup first round defeat away to Norwich City.

== International career ==
Silvera came on as a substitute for the Australian under-23 team in a draw against New Zealand on 9 September 2019.

In September 2023, Silvera was called-up for the first time to the Australia senior national team ahead of a friendly match against Mexico. He made his senior debut against Mexico, coming on as a substitute in a 2–2 draw. Silvera was selected in the Australian squad for the 2023 AFC Asian Cup.

== Career statistics ==
=== Club ===
As of 8 August 2026

Appearances and goals by club, season and competition
Club	Season	League			National Cup (Note: Includes FFA Cup, FA Cup)		League Cup (Note: Includes EFL Cup)		Other		Total	
Club	Season	Division	Apps	Goals	Apps	Goals	Apps	Goals	Apps	Goals	Apps	Goals
Western Sydney Wanderers (NPL)	2017	NPL NSW 2	4	0	—		—		—		4	0
Western Sydney Wanderers (NPL)	2018	NPL NSW 2	24	4	—		—		—		24	4
Western Sydney Wanderers (NPL)	2019	NPL NSW 2	2	0	—		—		—		2	0
Western Sydney Wanderers (NPL)	Total		30	4	0	0	0	0	0	0	30	4
Central Coast Mariners	2019–20	A-League	21	1	4	1	—		—		25	2
Paços de Ferreira	2020–21	Primeira Liga	0	0	0	0	0	0	—		0	0
Paços de Ferreira	2021–22	Primeira Liga	0	0	0	0	0	0	0	0	0	0
Paços de Ferreira	Total		0	0	0	0	0	0	0	0	0	0
Casa Pia (loan)	2020–21	Liga Portugal 2	4	0	0	0	—		—		4	0
Sanjoanense (loan)	2020–21	Campeonato de Portugal	11	1	0	0	—		—		11	1
Newcastle Jets (loan)	2021–22	A-League Men	19	1	2	0	—		—		21	1
Central Coast Mariners	2022–23	A-League Men	29	8	0	0	—		—		29	8
Middlesbrough	2023–24	Championship	37	4	0	0	5	2	—		42	6
Middlesbrough	2024–25	Championship	0	0	0	0	0	0	—		0	0
Middlesbrough	2025–26	Championship	22	2	1	0	0	0	0	0	23	2
Middlesbrough	Total		59	6	1	0	5	2	0	0	65	8
Portsmouth (loan)	2024–25	Championship	11	0	0	0	1	0	—		12	0
Blackpool (loan)	2024–25	League One	15	1	—		—		—		15	1
Milton Keynes Dons	2026–27	League One	0	0	0	0	1	0	0	0	1	0
Total			199	22	7	1	7	2	0	0	213	25

=== International ===
As of 16 January 2026

Appearances and goals by national team and year
National team	Year	Apps	Goals
Australia	2023	2	0
Australia	2024	5	0
Australia	2025	1	0
Total		8	0

== Honours ==
Central Coast Mariners

- A-League Men Championship: 2022–23
