= Béni Nkololo =

French footballer (born 1996)

Personal information
- Full name: Béni Jean-Luc Nkololo
- Date of birth: 6 November 1996 (age 30)
- Place of birth: Rennes, France
- Height: 1.86 m (6 ft 1 in)
- Position: Winger

Team information
- Current team: Beijing Guoan
- Number: 20

Youth career
- –2015: Brest

Senior career*
Years	Team	Apps	(Gls)
2014–2017	Brest B	23	(5)
2016–2017	Brest	1	(0)
2016–2017	→ Avranches (loan)	20	(1)
2016–2017	→ Avranches B (loan)	13	(1)
2017–2018	Avranches	31	(6)
2017	Avranches B	4	(0)
2018–2019	Tours	20	(2)
2019	Tours B	2	(0)
2019–2020	Lyon La Duchère	9	(0)
2019–2020	Lyon La Duchère B	2	(0)
2020–2021	Concarneau	26	(1)
2021–2023	Central Coast Mariners	49	(15)
2023–2024	Al-Orobah	32	(5)
2024–2025	CFR Cluj	34	(3)
2025–2026	Panetolikos	12	(4)
2026–	Beijing Guoan	9	(0)
- * Club domestic league appearances and goals as of 19 November 2026

Béni Jean-Luc Nkololo (born 6 November 1996) is a French professional footballer who plays as a winger for Chinese Super League club Beijing Guoan.

Nkololo was born in France and played for Stade Brestois 29 in Ligue 2 and a number of clubs in the Championnat National before moving to Australia to play for Central Coast Mariners in 2021.

== Early life ==
Nkololo was born in Rennes, France, to Zairean parents born in Léopoldville. He acquired French nationality on 28 January 2004, through the collective effect of his parents' naturalization.

== Career ==
In July 2020, Nkololo signed with Championnat National side US Concarneau.

In August 2021, Nkololo signed with Australian side Central Coast Mariners. He scored on debut for the Mariners in a win over Blacktown City in the 2021 FFA Cup on 13 November 2021.

Nkololo was part of the Central Coast Mariners' A-League Men Championship winning team in 2022-23, scoring the sixth of the side's goals in the 2023 A-League Men Grand Final.

In August 2023, Nkololo was granted a release by the Mariners on compassionate grounds to join a club in Saudi Arabia. He left the Mariners having scored seventeen goals over two seasons.

On 4 July 2024, Nkololo joined Romanian side CFR Cluj.

On 6 February 2026, Nkololo signed for Chinese Super League club Beijing Guoan, reuniting with his former manager Nick Montgomery, from his stint at Central Coast Mariners.

== Personal life ==
Nkololo is the brother of Jordan Nkololo.

== Career statistics ==
As of match played 17 April 2026

Appearances and goals by club, season and competition
Club	Season	League			Cup		Continental		Other		Total	
Club	Season	Division	Apps	Goals	Apps	Goals	Apps	Goals	Apps	Goals	Apps	Goals
Brest B	2014–15	CFA 2	2	1	—		—		—		2	1
Brest B	2015–16	CFA 2	21	4	—		—		—		21	4
Brest B	Total		23	5	—		—		—		23	5
Avranches	2015–16	Ligue 2	1	0	—		—		—		1	0
Avranches (loan)	2016–17	National	20	1	5	2	—		—		25	3
Avranches B (loan)	2016–17	CFA 2	13	1	—		—		—		13	1
Avranches	2017–18	National	31	6	3	3	—		—		34	9
Avranches B	2017–18	National 3	4	0	—		—		—		4	0
Tours	2018–19	National	20	2	1	0	—		1	0	22	2
Tours B	2018–19	National 3	2	0	—		—		—		2	0
Lyon La Duchère	2019–20	National	9	0	1	1	—		—		10	1
Lyon La Duchère B	2019–20	National 3	2	0	—		—		—		2	0
Concarneau	2020–21	National	26	1	1	0	—		—		27	1
Central Coast Mariners	2021–22	A-League Men	23	7	4	1	—		—		15	0
Central Coast Mariners	2022–23	A-League Men	26	8	1	1	—		—		25	1
Central Coast Mariners	Total		49	15	5	2	—		—		54	17
Al-Orobah	2023–24	Saudi First Division	32	5	1	0	—		—		33	5
CFR Cluj	2024–25	Liga I	29	3	4	2	5	1	—		38	6
CFR Cluj	2025–26	Liga I	5	0	—		8	0	0	0	13	0
CFR Cluj	Total		34	3	4	2	13	1	0	0	51	6
Panetolikos	2025–26	Super League Greece	12	4	4	0	—		—		16	5
Beijing Guoan	2026	Chinese Super League	6	0	0	0	—		1	0	7	0
Career total			284	43	25	10	13	1	2	0	324	54

== Honours ==
Central Coast Mariners

- A-League Men Championship: 2022–23
- Australia Cup runner-up: 2021

CFR Cluj

- Cupa României: 2024–25
- Supercupa României runner-up: 2025

Beijing Guoan

- Chinese FA Super Cup: 2026
