= Kelechi John =

Nigerian footballer (born 1998)

Personal information
- Full name: Kelechi John Christian
- Date of birth: 7 September 1998 (age 28)
- Place of birth: Kaduna, Nigeria
- Height: 1.91 m (6 ft 3 in)
- Position: Centre-back

Team information
- Current team: União de Santarém
- Number: 17

Youth career
- 2016: El-Kanemi
- 2017–2020: Rio Ave

Senior career*
Years	Team	Apps	(Gls)
2016	Plateau United	20	(3)
2020–2022	Casa Pia	55	(0)
2022–2023	Central Coast Mariners	3	(0)
2023	B-SAD	14	(2)
2023–2024	Oliveirense	32	(2)
2024–2025	Portimonense	15	(1)
2026	Sanjoanense	6	(0)
2026–	União de Santarém	3	(0)
- * Club domestic league appearances and goals as of 12 September 2026

Kelechi John Christian, known as Kelechi John (born 7 September 1998) is a Nigerian professional footballer who plays as a centre-back for Portuguese Liga 3 club União de Santarém.

== Career ==
John started his career in Nigeria, before moving to Portugal and signing with Rio Ave F.C. where he played in their youth and reserve teams

=== Central Coast Mariners ===
John moved from Portugal to Australia and signed for the Central Coast Mariners in the A-League Men competition., becoming their sixth signing of the 2022-23 season. He made his debut for the Gosford side for their Round 2 away trip to Wellington Phoenix in a 2–2 draw.

After suffering an re-occurring injury and struggling to return to the first team due to excellent performances from his injury replacement Brian Kaltak, the Mariners agreed to sell him to B-SAD in the Liga Portugal 2 for an undisclosed amount.

On 11 July 2023 Liga Portugal 2's Oliveirense announced the signing of John for an undisclosed fee.

== International career ==
John has been called up to represent the Nigerian U-23s.
