= 2023 A-League Men Grand Final =

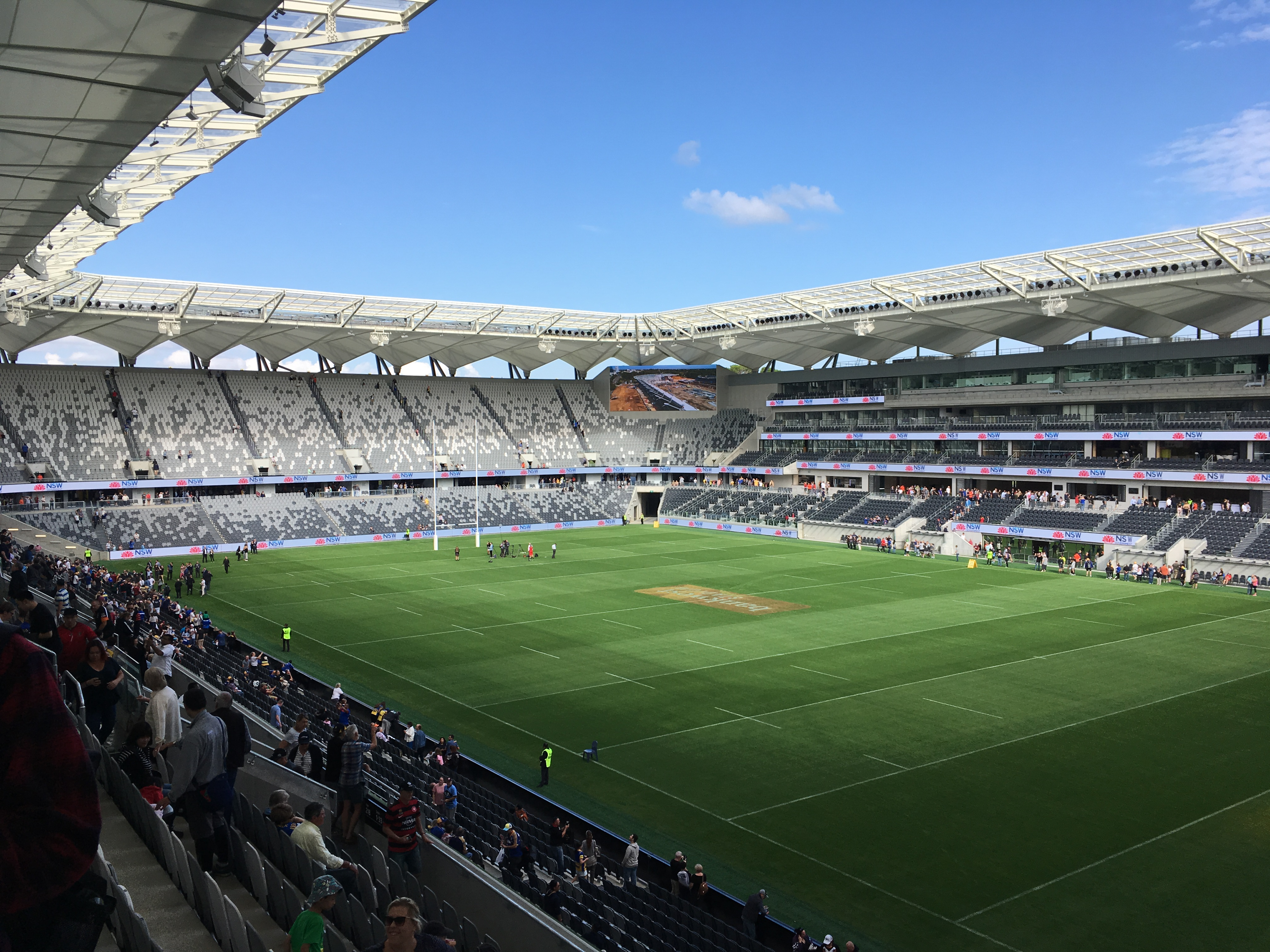
- CommBank Stadium in Sydney hosted the 2023 Grand Final
- Event: 2022–23 A-League Men
Melbourne City	Central Coast Mariners
1	6
- Date: 3 June 2023
- Venue: CommBank Stadium, Parramatta
- Joe Marston Medal: Jason Cummings
- Referee: Chris Beath
- Attendance: 26,523

The 2023 A-League Men Grand Final was the 18th A-League Men Grand Final, the championship-deciding match of the Australian A-League Men, and the culmination of the 2022–23 season. The match was played on 3 June 2023 at CommBank Stadium in Parramatta between Melbourne City and Central Coast Mariners.

== Background ==
Melbourne City were playing their fourth A-League Grand Final, achieving champion status just once in 2021. City had lost the previous season's edition of the Grand Final against Western United at their home stadium. They had also lost in their first Grand Final appearance after losing to Sydney FC in 2020. In both Grand Final losses, City were contesting as minor premiers. For Central Coast Mariners, it was their first Grand Final since 2013 when they defeated Western Sydney Wanderers at Sydney Football Stadium. They had previously won the minor premiership twice in 2007–08 and 2011–12 seasons and made four Grand Final appearances during that time. The only notable success the Mariners had in the last decade was when they achieved runners-up in the 2021 FFA Cup final. Melbourne City finished the regular 2022–23 season as minor premierships with Central Coast Mariners finishing one place below them in second. As a result, both automatically qualified for the semi-finals of the A-League. City finished with 55 points, 11 points above the Mariners and 13 points above Adelaide United who sat third, followed by Western Sydney Wanderers, Sydney FC and Wellington Phoenix.

=== Previous finals ===
In the following table, finals until 2004 were in the National Soccer League era, since 2006 were in the A-League Men era.

Team	Previous grand final appearances (bold indicates winners)
Melbourne City	3 (2020, **2021**, 2022)
Central Coast Mariners	4 (2006, 2008, 2011, **2013**)

== Road to the final ==
=== Summary ===
Following the regular season, a five-week Finals Series is played to determine the winner of the A-League Championship. The top two highest-placed teams are given a bye into the semi-finals, while third to sixth are drawn into the elimination finals; both third and fourth hosts against the sixth and fifth-placed sides respectively. The winners progress to a two-legged semi-final, first introduced in the 2021–22 season, with the first leg played at the home stadium of the lowest-ranked club. Both legs' results are put into an aggregate score to decide the winner that will face each other in the Grand Final. If the aggregate scores are level, the second match will go into extra time, and then to a penalty shoot-out if the score remains level. The Away Goals rule is not used in the semi-finals.

For the 2022–23 season, Adelaide United faced Wellington Phoenix at Coopers Stadium, and Western Sydney Wanderers played Sydney FC at CommBank Stadium in the elimination final. Both matches were played from 5 May to 6 May 2023, with the Sydney Derby set in a Finals Series for the first time in A-League history. The two highest-placed teams, Melbourne City and Central Coast Mariners, were given a one-week bye for the semi-final clash. City won their third-consecutive Premiership with 49 points and two matches remaining, becoming the first club in the A-League to win the Premiership three times in a row. Both the Mariners and Adelaide United made their best-placed league finishes in under a decade, with the former earning continental qualification to the AFC Cup for the first time since the 2013–14 campaign.

Melbourne City				Round	Central Coast Mariners			
2022–23 A-League Men 1st placed / Premiers: Pos / Team / Pld / Pts; 1 / Melbourne City / 26 / 55; 2 / Central Coast Mariners (C) / 26 / 44; 3 / Adelaide United / 26 / 42; 4 / Western Sydney Wanderers / 26 / 41; 5 / Sydney FC / 26 / 38; Source: A-Leagues (C) Champions				Regular season	2022–23 A-League Men 2nd placed: Pos / Team / Pld / Pts; 1 / Melbourne City / 26 / 55; 2 / Central Coast Mariners (C) / 26 / 44; 3 / Adelaide United / 26 / 42; 4 / Western Sydney Wanderers / 26 / 41; 5 / Sydney FC / 26 / 38; Source: A-Leagues (C) Champions			
Opponent	Score			Elimination-finals	Opponent	Score		
Bye				Elimination-finals	Bye			
Opponent	Agg.	1st leg	2nd leg	Semi-finals	Opponent	Agg.	1st leg	2nd leg
Sydney FC	5–1	1–1 (A)	4–0 (H)	Semi-finals	Adelaide United	4–1	2–1 (A)	2–0 (H)

=== Melbourne City ===
Melbourne City's opponents in the semi-final were Sydney FC and the first leg was played on 12 May 2023 at Allianz Stadium in Sydney. The Sky Blues reached the semi-finals after their 2–1 win against Western Sydney Wanderers in the elimination finals. The match kicked off at 7:45 p.m. (AEDT) and ended in a 1–1 draw in front off 15,322 spectators. Mathew Leckie opened the score early in the first half for City, before Adam Le Fondre equalised from a retaken penalty, initially taken by Anthony Caceres and intervened through VAR. The returning leg commenced on 19 May in Melbourne in front of a crowd of 9,223. The first half saw Max Burgess sent off in the 21st minute of the match for a challenge on Marco Tilio, who was named "man of the match" by viewers. The leg ended in a 4–0 win for Melbourne City, adding towards a 5–1 aggregate and allowing them through to their fourth consecutive Grand Final. Curtis Good, Tilio and Richard van der Venne scored a goal each, extended by an own-goal from Sydney's Jack Rodwell. Burgess was given a two-match suspension for serious foul play.

=== Central Coast Mariners ===
Central Coast Mariners finished runners-up in the regular season, beating Adelaide United to second in the final round. Earning a bye past the first week, they matched up against Adelaide United, who had beaten Wellington Phoenix 2–0 in the elimination finals. The first leg was played away in Adelaide, with a sold-out 15,771 attendees at Coopers Stadium. Despite a 4th-minute penalty conversion from Craig Goodwin, Central Coast Mariners dominated the first half, coming back to win 2–1 with first-half goals from James McGarry and Jason Cummings. The second leg was played in front of a crowd of 20,059, the first time Industree Group Stadium had been sold out by the Mariners. After a goalless first half, Central Coast Mariners grabbed two quick goals to open up the second half courtesy of Samuel Silvera and Marco Túlio. They ultimately saw out this lead to win 4–1 on aggregate, reaching their first grand final since 2013.

== Pre-match ==
=== Venue and promotions ===
In December 2022, the Australian Professional Leagues (APL) announced that the 2023, 2024, and 2025 A-League Men Grand Finals would be hosted in Sydney regardless of which two teams qualified. This was to replicate a tradition similar to the English FA Cup and Coupe de France, where they play in a fixed venue at the final stage of the competition. The decision was heavily criticised by supporters of non-Sydney based clubs, leading to major events, including the elimination and semi-finals rounds, to be boycotted by home and away crowds. The Grand Final was broadcast live and free on Network 10 in Sydney, Melbourne, Brisbane and Adelaide, 10 Bold in Perth, and streamed on Paramount+ and 10Play.

On 2 May 2023, CommBank Stadium was confirmed to be the host venue of the 2023 A-League Men Grand Final scheduled on 3 June. Tickets went on sale on 22 May, attached with a 20% discount, for all club members. Tickets for non-participating club members and the general public were opened in the following two days. As part of the Grand Final, travelling packages were offered for City fans, with discounts given by Qantas and the A-League's official partners. However, due to the APL decision for future finals, the active support group of Melbourne City and Sydney FC announced prior to the Finals Series that they would boycott the event if either side progressed through. Despite this, Melbourne City offered a road coach for their fans to travel from Melbourne to Sydney to attend the match. The Mariners offered similar services for their fans in Gosford.

=== Entertainment ===
On 2 June 2023, a day before the Grand Final, a Festival of Football or "Grand Final Party" was held at The Entertainment Quarter in Moore Park, Sydney for football fans to take part in and as part of the Grand Final decision made by the APL. The event took place from 2:30 to 10:00 p.m. which featured live music, street food, freestyle football and kids entertainment, with both Central Coast Mariners and Melbourne City players present for fans to meet during the festival. A 5-a-side exhibition tournament was also scheduled which featured former A-League and National Soccer League players, including retired Socceroos and Matildas players. The former National Soccer League players went against the former A-League Men players, whilst the former A-League Women players faced the retired Matildas players.

Notable players in 5-a-side
A-League Men Legends	National Soccer League Legends	A-League Women Legends	Matildas Alumni players
Alex Brosque; Cássio; Robert Cornthwaite; Matt McKay; Michael Theo; Joel Griffiths; Adam Griffiths; Brendon Santalab; Ante Covic (coach)	Clint Bolton; David Clarkson; David Zdrilic; Jason Culina; Fausto De Amicis; Pablo Cardozo; Chad Gibson; Luke Wilkshire (coach)	Cassidy Davis; Grace Maher; Racheal Quigley; Ellie Brush; Tara Andrews; Grace Gill	Heather Garriock; Dianne Alagich; Joanne Peters; Thea Slatyer; Servet Uzunlar

Other (Central Coast Mariners/Melbourne City 5-a-side)

- Andre Gumprecht
- Adam Kwasnik
- Tommy Oar
- Brad Porter
- Josh Rose
- Sophie Nenadovic
- Daniel McBreen (coach)
- James Brown
- Jonatan Germano
- Kamal Ibrahim
- Jacob Melling
- Nikola Roganovic
- Dylan Macallister
- Rhali Dobson
- Bryleeh Henry
- Holly McNamara
- María José Rojas

=== Build-up to Final ===
In the matches played between Melbourne City and Central Coast Mariners during the regular season, City have won once and drew once with the Mariners, winning 1–0 at home before setting with a 1–1 draw in Gosford. In previous seasons, City has met Central Coast 36 times, winning 16 matches and losing 12 times against their opposition. Melbourne striker Jamie Maclaren was the highest goalscorer of the league for a fourth consecutive year with a tally of 24 goals, becoming the A-League's all-time leading goalscorer in the process. Jason Cummings is the Mariners' top goalscorer, coming second in the Golden Boot with 16 goals to his name. In terms of accolades, Jordan Bos was awarded the A-League Men Young Footballer of the Year in the Dolan Warren Awards; the only other player of either finalist clubs besides Maclaren to be awarded.

The referee for the match was announced to be Chris Beath, who would officiate his fourth A-League Men Grand Final, having done so in the 2019–20, 2020–21 and 2021–22 finals. He has also been an additional assistant referee in the 2016 A-League Grand Final and a fourth official in the 2019 A-League Grand Final. Anton Shchetinin and Ashley Beecham were named as the assistant referees, with Adam Kersey and Brad Wright appointed as the fourth and fifth officials respectively. The Video Assistant Referee (VAR) was Kate Jacewicz, assisted by Shaun Evans and Kearney Robinson. On 1 June, Beath announced his retirement before the Grand Final which was to be his 234th and last official A-League match. City full-back Scott Jamieson also announced his retirement before the final, having been offered a coaching role at his club.

Rado Vidošić confirmed two changes in his Grand Final squad, with Raphael Borges Rodrigues and Jordon Hall being promoted. Arion Sulemani and James Nieuwenhuizen were both ruled out with injury. In the match, Vidošić kept an unchanged line-up from the team that defeated Sydney FC in the semi-final. Mariners' head coach Nick Montgomery also kept an unchanged starting line-up from their home victory against Adelaide United. Brad Tapp was ruled out from the squad due to injury. In a pre-match interview, Jason Cummings announced his departure from the Mariners which was set to occur after the Grand Final. The weather in Parramatta was described to be "mild and dry" by journalists Joey Lynch, noting that more Mariners supporters were in attendance than City's. The Welcome to Country was performed before kick-off ensued at 7:55 p.m.

== Match ==
=== Details ===
3 June 2023
19:45 AEST

Melbourne City	1–6	Central Coast Mariners
Van der Venne 40'	Report	Cummings 20', 65' (pen.), 73' (pen.); Silvera 34'; Nkololo 83'; Moresche 90+1'

CommBank Stadium, Sydney
Attendance: 26,523
Referee: Chris Beath

Melbourne; City	Central Coast; Mariners

GK	1	(Australia) Tom Glover
RB	4	(Portugal) Nuno Reis	(yellow card) 45'	(substituted off) 69'
CB	6	(Finland) Thomas Lam
CB	22	(Australia) Curtis Good
LB	38	(Australia) Jordan Bos		(substituted off) 88'
DM	13	(Australia) Aiden O'Neill
RM	23	(Australia) Marco Tilio	(yellow card) 79'
LM	14	(Kosovo) Valon Berisha		(substituted off) 22'
AM	9	(Australia) Jamie Maclaren (c)
CF	15	(Australia) Andrew Nabbout		(substituted off) 88'
CF	7	(Australia) Mathew Leckie
Substitutes:
GK	33	(Australia) Matt Sutton
DF	2	(Australia) Scott Galloway		(substituted on) 88'
DF	3	(Australia) Scott Jamieson
DF	25	(Australia) Callum Talbot		(substituted on) 69'
MF	8	(Netherlands) Richard van der Venne		(substituted on) 22'
MF	10	(France) Florin Berenguer		(substituted on) 88'
FW	37	(Australia) Max Caputo
Manager:
(Australia) Rado Vidosic

GK	20	(Australia) Danny Vukovic (c)
CB	15	(New Zealand) Storm Roux		(substituted off) 78'
CB	3	(Vanuatu) Brian Kaltak
CB	5	(New Zealand) James McGarry		(substituted off) 63'
DM	6	(Australia) Max Balard		(substituted off) 78'
RM	11	(France) Béni Nkololo
CM	25	(Australia) Nectarios Triantis	(yellow card) 51'	(substituted off) 85'
CM	4	(Australia) Josh Nisbet
LM	7	(Australia) Samuel Silvera		(substituted off) 85'
CF	98	(Brazil) Marco Túlio	(yellow card) 89'
CF	9	(Australia) Jason Cummings
Substitutes:
GK	24	(Australia) Yaren Sözer
DF	18	(Australia) Jacob Farrell		(substituted on) 63'
DF	23	(Fiji) Dan Hall		(substituted on) 78'
MF	13	(Australia) Harry Steele		(substituted on) 78'
FW	10	(Brazil) Moresche	(yellow card) 90+2'	(substituted on) 85'
FW	14	(Australia) Dylan Wenzel-Halls
FW	31	(Australia) Christian Theoharous		(substituted on) 85'
Manager:
(Scotland) Nick Montgomery

Man of the Match (Joe Marston Medal):
Jason Cummings

Assistant referees:
Anton Shchetinin
Ashley Beecham
Fourth official:
Adam Kersey
Fifth official:
Brad Wright
Video assistant referee:
Kate Jacewicz
Assistant video assistant referees:
Shaun Evans
Kearney Robinson

Match rules

- 90 minutes.
- 30 minutes of extra time if necessary.
- Penalty shoot-out if scores still level.
- Seven named substitutes.
- Maximum of five substitutions, with a sixth allowed in extra time. (Note: Each team was given only three opportunities to make substitutions, with a fourth opportunity in extra time, excluding substitutions made at half-time, before the start of extra time and at half-time in extra time.)

=== Statistics ===
First half
Statistic	Melbourne City	Central Coast Mariners
Goals scored	1	2
Total shots	8	9
Shots on target	3	7
Saves	4	2
Ball possession	59%	41%
Corner kicks	1	2
Fouls committed		
Offsides	0	1
Yellow cards	1	1
Red cards	0	0

Second half
Statistic	Melbourne City	Central Coast Mariners
Goals scored	0	4
Total shots	10	5
Shots on target	1	4
Saves	0	0
Ball possession	70%	30%
Corner kicks	3	0
Fouls committed		
Offsides	0	1
Yellow cards	1	2
Red cards	0	0

Overall
Statistic	Melbourne City	Central Coast Mariners
Goals scored	1	6
Total shots	18	14
Shots on target	4	11
Saves	4	2
Ball possession	64%	36%
Corner kicks	4	2
Fouls committed	17	9
Offsides	0	2
Yellow cards	2	3
Red cards	0	0

== See also ==
- 2022–23 A-League Men
