= Dor Jok =

South Sudanese footballer

Personal information
- Full name: Atem Dor Jok
- Date of birth: 27 February 2001 (age 25)
- Place of birth: Sudan (now South Sudan)
- Height: 1.88 m (6 ft 2 in)
- Position: Forward

Team information
- Current team: Aurora Saigon United
- Number: 30

Youth career
- ECU Joondalup
- 2021–2022: Central Coast Mariners

Senior career*
Years	Team	Apps	(Gls)
2020	ECU Joondalup	4	(0)
2021	Cockburn City	3	(3)
2021	Melbourne Knights	7	(1)
2022–2023	Central Coast Mariners	7	(0)
2022	CCM Academy	18	(8)
2023	Port Melbourne	17	(6)
2024	Frechen 20	9	(1)
2025	Green Gully	5	(1)
2025–2026	Marsa	11	(6)
2026	Għajnsielem	4	(1)
2026–	Aurora Saigon United	4	(1)

International career^{‡}
2026–	South Sudan	1	(0)
- * Club domestic league appearances and goals as of 22 October 2026 ‡ National team caps and goals as of 28 March 2026

Atem Dor Jok (born 27 February 2001) is a South Sudanese professional footballer who plays as a forward for V.League 2 club Aurora Saigon United.

== Club career ==
He previously played in the A-League Men for Central Coast Mariners between 2022 and 2023.

On 9 September 2026, Jok joined Vietnamese club Aurora Saigon United, in the V.League 2, after playing for two clubs in Malta.
