= Marco Túlio (footballer, born March 1998) =

Brazilian footballer

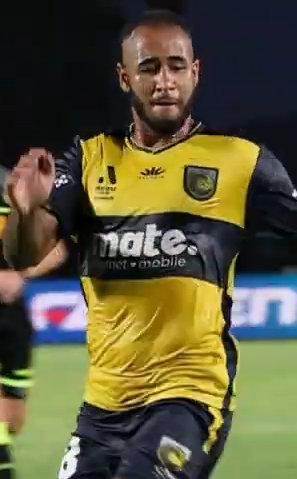
- Túlio playing for Central Coast Mariners in 2023

Personal information
- Full name: Marco Túlio Oliveira Lemos
- Date of birth: 13 March 1998 (age 28)
- Place of birth: Belo Horizonte, Brazil
- Height: 1.77 m (5 ft 10 in)
- Position: Forward

Team information
- Current team: Kyoto Sanga
- Number: 9

Youth career
- 2015–2017: Atlético Mineiro

Senior career*
| Years | Team | Apps | (Gls) |
| 2017–2018 | Atlético Mineiro | 7 | (0) |
| 2018–2022 | Sporting CP B | 6 | (0) |
| 2019–2020 | → KSV Roeselare (loan) | 16 | (1) |
| 2021–2022 | → CSA (loan) | 55 | (7) |
| 2022–2024 | Central Coast Mariners | 40 | (15) |
| 2024– | Kyoto Sanga | 60 | (15) |

International career
| 2015 | Brazil U17 | 5 | (0) |
Medal record
Atlético Mineiro
| Winner | Campeonato Mineiro | 2017 |
| Runner-up | Campeonato Mineiro | 2018 |
Representing Brazil
| Winner | South American U-17 Championship | 2015 |
- * Club domestic league appearances and goals as of 1 August 2026

Marco Túlio Oliveira Lemos (born 13 March 1998), commonly known as Marco Túlio, is a Brazilian professional footballer who plays as a forward for Kyoto Sanga.

== Club career ==
=== Sporting CP ===
In the summer of 2018, Marco Túlio signed a five-year contract with Sporting CP until 2023.

=== Central Coast Mariners ===
On 19 September 2022, Túlio was announced to have signed for the Central Coast Mariners ahead of the 2022–23 A-League season. Túlio was part of the Mariners championship winning team in his first season, including playing every minute of the 6–1 victory over Melbourne City in the Grand Final. Túlio scored 10 league goals over the course of the campaign, which saw him named on the bench of the A-League Team of the Season.

Following the Championship winning debut season, Túlio signed a two-year contract extension to remain with the club. On 4 October 2023, Túlio scored a hat-trick in the 2023–24 AFC Cup group stage match against Philippines club, Stallion Laguna in a massive 9–1 home victory.

On 28 December 2023, halfway through Tulio's second season at the Mariners, it was announced that he would be transferred to Kyoto Sanga in Japan. He played two more matches for the club, scoring in both of them. Despite having left the club months prior to the title being won, Tulio was part of the Mariners' 2023-24 premiership winning season.

=== Kyoto Sanga ===
Tulio joined Kyoto Sanga in January after completing his commitments with the Mariners.

== International career ==
Marco Túlio represented Brazil at the 2015 South American Under-17 Football Championship.

== Career statistics ==
=== Club ===
As of match played 6 January 2024

| Club | Season | League | | | State league (Note: Includes Campeonato Mineiro, Campeonato Alagoano) | | National cup (Note: Includes Copa do Brasil, Belgian Cup, Australia Cup) | | Continental | | Other | | Total | |
| Club | Season | Division | Apps | Goals | Apps | Goals | Apps | Goals | Apps | Goals | Apps | Goals | Apps | Goals |
|---|---|---|---|---|---|---|---|---|---|---|---|---|---|---|
| Atlético Mineiro | 2017 | Série A | 0 | 0 | 1 | 0 | 0 | 0 | – | | – | | 1 | 0 |
| Atlético Mineiro | 2018 | Série A | 0 | 0 | 6 | 0 | 1 | 0 | – | | – | | 7 | 0 |
| Atlético Mineiro | Total | | 0 | 0 | 7 | 0 | 1 | 0 | – | | – | | 8 | 0 |
| Sporting CP | 2018–19 | Primeira Liga | 0 | 0 | – | | 0 | 0 | 0 | 0 | – | | 0 | 0 |
| Sporting CP | 2020–21 | Primeira Liga | 0 | 0 | – | | 0 | 0 | 0 | 0 | – | | 0 | 0 |
| KSV Roeselare (loan) | 2019–20 | Belgian First Division B | 16 | 1 | – | | 1 | 0 | – | | – | | 17 | 1 |
| CSA (loan) | 2021 | Série B | 26 | 4 | 9 | 0 | 2 | 0 | – | | 8 (Note: Appearances in Copa do Nordeste) | 3 | 45 | 7 |
| CSA (loan) | 2022 | Série B | 10 | 0 | 10 | 3 | 2 | 1 | – | | 7 | 1 | 29 | 5 |
| CSA (loan) | Total | | 36 | 4 | 19 | 3 | 4 | 1 | – | | 15 | 4 | 74 | 12 |
| Central Coast Mariners | 2022–23 | A-League Men | 29 | 10 | – | | 0 | 0 | – | | – | | 29 | 10 |
| Central Coast Mariners | 2023–24 | A-League Men | 11 | 5 | – | | 1 | 1 | 6 (Note: Appearances in AFC Cup) | 8 | – | | 18 | 14 |
| Central Coast Mariners | Total | | 40 | 15 | – | | 1 | 1 | 6 | 8 | – | | 47 | 24 |
| Career total | | | 92 | 20 | 26 | 3 | 7 | 2 | 6 | 8 | 15 | 4 | 146 | 37 |

== Honours ==
CSA

- Campeonato Alagoano: 2021

Central Coast Mariners

- A-League Men Championship: 2022–23
- A-League Men Premiership: 2023–24
- AFC Cup: 2023–24

Individual

- PFA A-League Team of the Season: 2022–23
- AFC Cup Top Goal Scorer: 2023–24
