= Yaren Sözer =

Australian soccer player

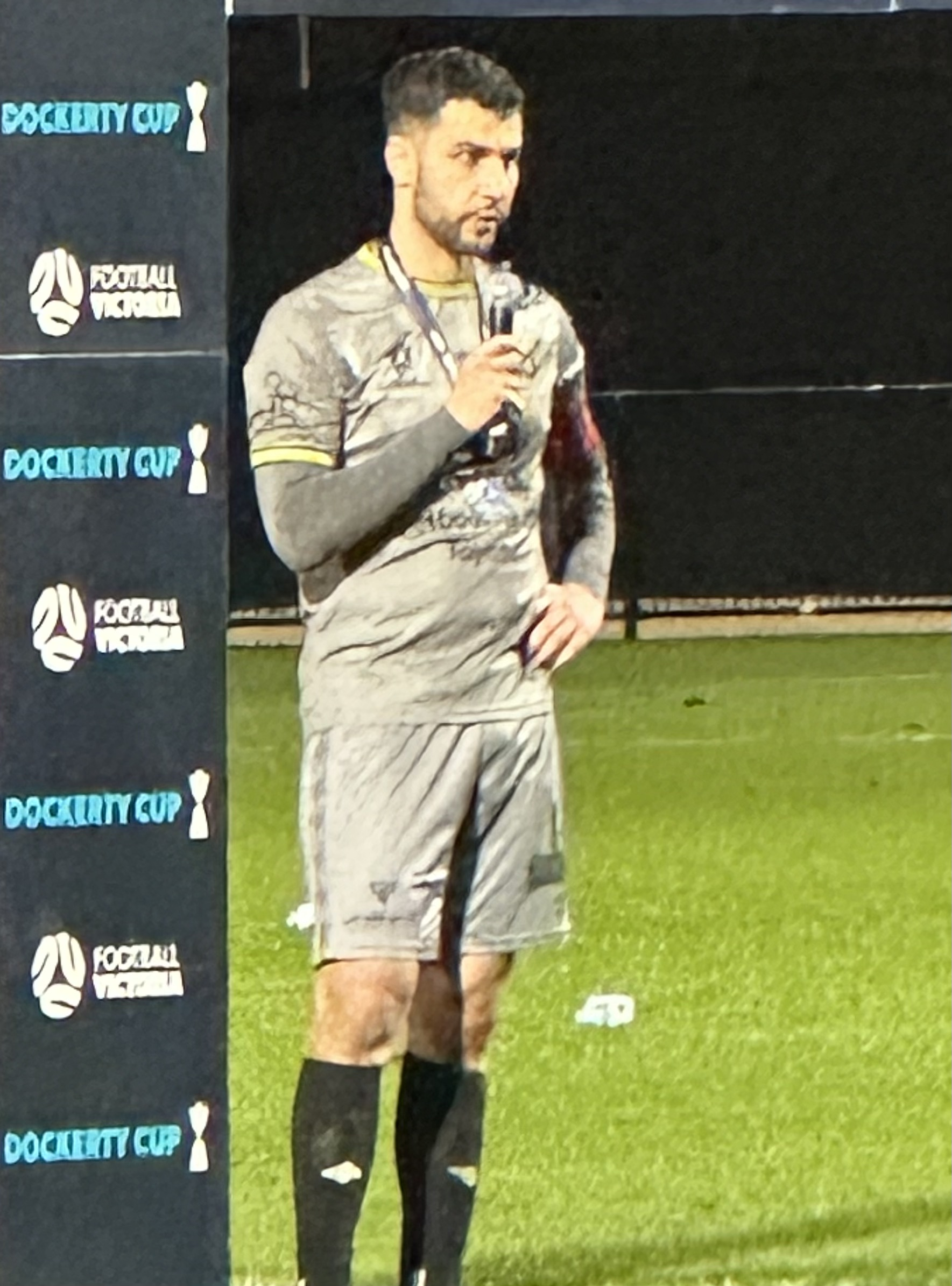

Personal information
- Full name: Yaren İzzet Sözer
- Date of birth: 19 April 1997 (age 29)
- Place of birth: Melbourne, Victoria, Australia
- Height: 1.89 m (6 ft 2 in)
- Position: Goalkeeper

Team information
- Current team: Heidelberg United
- Number: 1

Youth career
- 2015–2018: Melbourne City

Senior career*
Years	Team	Apps	(Gls)
2014	Pascoe Vale	20	(0)
2017–2018	Melbourne City NPL	37	(0)
2018–2019	İstanbul Başakşehir	0	(0)
2018–2019	→ Esenler Erokspor (loan)	1	(0)
2019–2020	Esenler Erokspor	1	(0)
2020	→ 1877 Alemdağ Spor (loan)	0	(0)
2020	Perak	0	(0)
2020–2021	Esenler Erokspor	1	(0)
2021–2023	Central Coast Mariners	1	(0)
2023	St George City	7	(0)
2023–2024	Gudja United	9	(0)
2024–	Heidelberg United	54	(0)

International career
2016	Australia U20	1	(0)
- * Club domestic league appearances and goals as of 18 September 2025

Yaren İzzet Sözer (born 19 April 1997) is an Australian professional footballer who plays as a goalkeeper for Heidelberg United.

== Playing career ==
=== Club ===
==== Central Coast Mariners ====
Sözer signed for A-League Men side Central Coast Mariners in October 2021 as a backup goalkeeper to Mark Birighitti. He made his debut for the Mariners in a win over Wollongong Wolves on 1 December 2021 in the 2021 FFA Cup, coming on after 20 minutes when Birighitti was sent off. With Birighitti suspended, Sözer made his A-League Men debut in the following game against Macarthur, however, he was forced from the field in the first half due to injury.

Sözer made a third competitive appearance for the Mariners against Sydney FC in the opening round of the 2022 Australia Cup in July 2022. The game went to a penalty shoot-out, which the Mariners lost despite Sözer saving Adam Le Fondre's attempt.

Sözer was a member of the Mariners side that won the 2022–23 A-League Men Championship. He departed the club at the conclusion of the season.

=== International ===
Sozer played for the Australia under-20 side in a win over Myanmar at the 2016 AFF U-19 Youth Championship on 14 September 2016.

== Personal life ==
Born in Melbourne, Victoria, Sözer is of Turkish descent and holds a Turkish passport.

== Honours ==
Melbourne City

- National Youth League: 2016–17

Central Coast Mariners

- A-League Men Championship: 2022–23
