= Lewis Miller (soccer) =

Australian soccer player (born 2000)

Personal information
- Full name: Lewis Miller
- Date of birth: 24 August 2000 (age 26)
- Place of birth: Sydney, Australia
- Height: 1.87 m (6 ft 2 in)
- Position: Right back

Team information
- Current team: Blackburn Rovers
- Number: 33

Youth career
- Pittwater RSL
- Manly United
- 2016: Sydney FC
- 2017: Central Coast Mariners

Senior career*
Years	Team	Apps	(Gls)
2017	North Shore Mariners	12	(0)
2018–2022	CCM Academy	48	(3)
2018–2022	Central Coast Mariners	54	(1)
2022–2025	Hibernian	65	(3)
2025–	Blackburn Rovers	29	(2)

International career^{‡}
2021–2022	Australia U23	8	(0)
2023–	Australia	20	(2)
- * Club domestic league appearances and goals as of 14 February 2026 ‡ National team caps and goals as of 19 November 2025

Lewis Miller (born 24 August 2000) is an Australian professional soccer player who plays as a right back for EFL Championship club Blackburn Rovers and the Australia national team.

== Club career ==
=== Central Coast Mariners ===
In October 2019, Miller was awarded a TAG Foundation scholarship with Central Coast Mariners, following a strong pre-season. Three months later, in January 2020, he signed a two-year contract, upgrading him to a professional senior contract.

=== Hibernian ===
In June 2022, Miller signed a three-year contract for Scottish Premiership side Hibernian, effective from 1 July. He had been due to join fellow A-League side Macarthur FC, having signed a pre-contract deal with them before the end of his contract at Central Coast Mariners, but then signed for Hibernian instead, netting Macarthur an undisclosed transfer fee.

In April 2025, Hibs activated a one-year extension to Miller's contract.

=== Blackburn Rovers ===
In August 2025, Miller signed a 3-year deal with the option of a further 12 months at Blackburn Rovers.

On 21 November 2025, Miller scored his first goal for the club with a header in a 2–1 away win over Preston North End. On 11 January 2026, Miller was named captain following the absence of Todd Cantwell from the squad. He played the full 90 minutes during a 0–0 draw with Hull City in the FA Cup. Hull went on to win the match on penalties.

On 14 February 2026, Miller came on as a half-time substitute in a 3–1 win over Queens Park Rangers at Loftus Road, but was stretchered off after nine minutes. Blackburn later confirmed that he had suffered a complete rupture of his Achilles tendon, excluding him from participating for Australia in the 2026 FIFA World Cup, with the injury expected to rule him out of action for nine months.

== International career ==
Miller was first called up to the Australian under-23 side in October 2021, for 2022 AFC U-23 Asian Cup qualification matches against Indonesia in Tajikistan. He made his debut for the side against Indonesia on 26 October 2021, winning a penalty in a 3–2 win. Miller was subsequently called up to the team for the final 2022 AFC U-23 Asian Cup in June 2022.

He was selected by the senior Australian national team in October 2023. Miller made his international debut on 13 October as a substitute against England at Wembley, becoming the 635th Socceroo. He made his first full appearance in the starting line-up on 16 November 2023 in a World Cup qualifier match against Bangladesh, in which his side won 7–0 at AAMI Park.

On 3 February 2024, Miller gave away a penalty and a direct free kick against South Korea at the quarter-finals of the 2023 AFC Asian Cup, with both set pieces leading to South Korea scoring; the game would end in a 1–2 loss.

Miller scored his first international goal on 10 October 2024, in a 3–1 win against China in 2026 World Cup qualifying.

== Career statistics ==
=== Club ===
As of match played on 14 February 2026

Appearances and goals by club, season and competition
Club	Season	League			National cup (Note: Includes Australia Cup, Scottish Cup, FA Cup)		League cup (Note: Includes Scottish League Cup, EFL Cup)		Continental		Other		Total	
Club	Season	Division	Apps	Goals	Apps	Goals	Apps	Goals	Apps	Goals	Apps	Goals	Apps	Goals
Central Coast Mariners	2018–19	A-League Men	2	0	—		—		—		—		2	0
Central Coast Mariners	2019–20	A-League Men	17	0	1	0	—		—		—		18	0
Central Coast Mariners	2020–21	A-League Men	13	0	—		—		—		—		13	0
Central Coast Mariners	2021–22	A-League Men	22	1	4	0	—		—		—		26	1
Central Coast Mariners	Total		54	1	5	0	—		—		—		59	1
Hibernian	2022–23	Scottish Premiership	12	0	0	0	4	0	—		—		16	0
Hibernian	2023–24	Scottish Premiership	21	2	1	0	3	0	5 (Note: Appearances in UEFA Conference League)	0	—		30	2
Hibernian	2024–25	Scottish Premiership	32	1	2	0	5	2	—		—		39	3
Hibernian	Total		65	3	3	0	12	2	5	0	—		85	5
Blackburn Rovers	2025–26	EFL Championship	29	2	1	0	1	0	—		—		31	2
Blackburn Rovers	2026–27	EFL Championship	0	0	0	0	0	0	—		—		0	0
Career total			148	6	9	0	13	2	5	0	—		175	8

=== International ===
As of match played 19 November 2025

Appearances and goals by national team and year
National team	Year	Apps	Goals
Australia	2023	4	0
Australia	2024	6	1
Australia	2025	10	1
Total		20	2

=== International goals ===
No.	Date	Venue	Opponent	Score	Result	Competition
1.	10 October 2024	Adelaide Oval, Adelaide, Australia	China	1–1	3–1	2026 FIFA World Cup qualification
2.	20 March 2025	Sydney Football Stadium, Sydney, Australia	Indonesia	4–0	5–1	2026 FIFA World Cup qualification
