= 2008–09 in Australian soccer =

Soccer in Australia
- Season: 2008–09

Men's soccer
- A-League Champions: Melbourne Victory
- A-League Premiers: Melbourne Victory
- National Youth League Champions: Sydney FC
- National Youth League Premiers: Sydney FC
- Pre-Season Cup: Melbourne Victory

Women's soccer
- W-League Champions: Queensland Roar
- W-League Premiers: Queensland Roar

The 2008–09 season was the 40th season of national competitive soccer in Australia and 126th overall.

== Domestic leagues ==
=== A-League ===
==== Regular season ====
Pos	Team	Pld	W	D	L	GF	GA	GD	Pts	Qualification
1	Melbourne Victory (C)	21	12	2	7	39	27	+12	38	Qualification for 2010 AFC Champions League group stage and Finals series
2	Adelaide United	21	11	5	5	31	19	+12	38	Qualification for 2010 AFC Champions League group stage and Finals series
3	Queensland Roar	21	10	6	5	36	25	+11	36	Qualification for Finals series
4	Central Coast Mariners	21	7	7	7	35	32	+3	28	Qualification for Finals series
5	Sydney FC	21	7	5	9	33	32	+1	26	
6	Wellington Phoenix	21	7	5	9	23	31	−8	26	
7	Perth Glory	21	6	4	11	31	44	−13	22	
8	Newcastle Jets	21	4	6	11	21	39	−18	18	

Source: ultimatealeague.com
Rules for classification: 1) points; 2) goal difference; 3) number of goals scored.
(C) Champions

==== Finals series ====
Semifinals
2	Adelaide United	0	0	0
1	Melbourne Victory	2	4	6
4	Central Coast Mariners	0	1	1
3	Queensland Roar	2	2	4

Preliminary final
2	Adelaide United	1
3	Queensland Roar	0

Final
1	Melbourne Victory	1
2	Adelaide United	0

=== W-League ===
==== Regular season ====
Pos	Team	Pld	W	D	L	GF	GA	GD	Pts	Qualification
1	Queensland Roar (C)	10	8	1	1	27	7	+20	25	Qualification to Finals series
2	Newcastle Jets	10	5	2	3	17	12	+5	17	Qualification to Finals series
3	Canberra United	10	4	4	2	14	10	+4	16	Qualification to Finals series
4	Sydney FC	10	4	2	4	15	14	+1	14	Qualification to Finals series
5	Melbourne Victory	10	4	0	6	13	13	0	12	
6	Central Coast Mariners	10	4	0	6	15	20	−5	12	
7	Perth Glory	10	3	2	5	14	24	−10	11	
8	Adelaide United	10	2	1	7	13	28	−15	7	

Rules for classification: 1) points; 2) goal difference; 3) number of goals scored.
(C) Champions

==== Finals series ====
Semi-finals
1	Queensland Roar	1 (5)
4	Sydney FC	1 (4)
2	Newcastle Jets	0
3	Canberra United	1

Grand Final
1	Queensland Roar	2
3	Canberra United	0

=== National Youth League ===
==== Regular season ====
Pos	Team	Pld	W	D	L	GF	GA	GD	Pts	Qualification
1	Sydney FC U21s (C)	18	13	2	3	43	22	+21	41	Qualification to Grand Final
2	Adelaide United U21s	18	10	5	3	36	14	+22	35	Qualification to Grand Final
3	Brisbane Roar U21s	18	10	3	5	34	22	+12	33	
4	Perth Glory U21s	18	7	2	9	28	31	−3	23	
5	Central Coast Mariners U21s	18	6	2	10	20	36	−16	20	
6	Melbourne Victory U21s	18	6	1	11	21	26	−5	19	
7	Newcastle Jets U21s	18	3	1	14	17	48	−31	10	

Rules for classification: 1) points; 2) goal difference; 3) number of goals scored.
(C) Champions

==== Grand Final ====
21 February 2009
14:30 UTC+10:30

Adelaide United	0 – 2	Sydney FC
	Report	Haydar 21'; Mileski 77'

Hindmarsh Stadium

== Domestic cups ==
=== A-League Pre-Season Challenge Cup ===
Group A

Team	Pld	W	D	L	GF	GA	GD	Pts	Qualification
Melbourne Victory	3	2	0	1	3	2	+1	6	Advances to final
Adelaide United	3	1	2	0	2	1	+1	5	
Newcastle Jets	3	0	2	1	1	2	−1	2	
Perth Glory	3	0	2	1	1	2	−1	2	

Group B

Team	Pld	W	D	L	GF	GA	GD	Pts	Qualification
Wellington Phoenix	3	2	1	0	5	3	+2	7	Advances to final
Central Coast Mariners	3	2	0	1	5	2	+3	6	
Sydney FC	3	1	0	2	4	7	−3	3	
Queensland Roar	3	0	1	2	3	5	−2	1	

Final

6 August 2008
19:30 (UTC+12:00)

Wellington Phoenix	0–0	Melbourne Victory
	Report
Penalties
Smeltz (penalty missed); Bertos (penalty scored); Hearfield (penalty scored); Coveny (penalty scored); Daniel (penalty scored); Ferrante (penalty scored); McKain (penalty scored); Johnson (penalty scored); Dodd (penalty missed)	7–8	Vargas (penalty scored); Pondeljak (penalty scored); López (penalty scored); Ward (penalty missed); Hernández (penalty scored); Ryall (penalty scored); Allsopp (penalty scored); Kemp (penalty scored); Berger (penalty scored)

Westpac Stadium, Wellington, New Zealand
Attendance: 9,208
Referee: Peter O'Leary (New Zealand)

== International club competitions ==
=== FIFA Club World Cup ===
==== Adelaide United ====
11 December 2008 Play-off	Adelaide United (Australia)	2–1	(New Zealand) Waitakere United	Tokyo, Japan
19:45 (UTC+09:00)	Mullen 39'; Dodd 83'	Report	Seaman 34'	Stadium: National Stadium; Attendance: 19,777; Referee: Mohamed Benouza (Algeria)

14 December 2008 Quarter-final	Adelaide United (Australia)	0–1	(Japan) Gamba Osaka	Toyota, Japan
19:30 (UTC+09:00)		Report	Endō 23'	Stadium: Toyota Stadium; Attendance: 38,141; Referee: Pablo Pozo (Chile)

18 December 2008 Match for fifth place	Al Ahly (Egypt)	0–1	(Australia) Adelaide United	Yokohama, Japan
16:30 (UTC+09:00)		Report	Cristiano 7'	Stadium: International Stadium Yokohama; Attendance: 35,154; Referee: Peter O'Leary (New Zealand)

=== AFC Champions League ===
==== Central Coast Mariners ====
11 March 2009 Group Stage	Central Coast Mariners (Australia)	0 – 0	(South Korea) Pohang Steelers	Gosford, Australia
20:00 AEDT	Bojić (yellow card) 40'; Simon (yellow card) 82'	Report	Shin Hyung-min (yellow card) 78'	Stadium: Bluetongue Stadium; Attendance: 6,870; Referee: Khalil Al-Ghamdi (Saudi Arabia)

18 March 2009 Group Stage	Tianjin Teda (China)	2 – 2	(Australia) Central Coast Mariners	Tianjin, China
20:00 CST	Éber 37'; Tan Wangsong (yellow card) 41'; Wu Weian 66'; Cao Yang (yellow card) 84'	Report	Simon (yellow card) 6' (goal) 61'; Boogaard (yellow card) 30'; Bojić (yellow card) 40'; Caceres 48'	Stadium: TEDA Football Stadium; Attendance: 27,005; Referee: Malik Abdul Bashir (Singapore)

8 April 2009 Group Stage	Central Coast Mariners (Australia)	0 – 5	(Japan) Kawasaki Frontale	Gosford, Australia
20:00 (AEST)	Osman (yellow card) 10'	Report	Jong Tae-se 8'; Taniguchi 22'; Juninho 37'; Nakamura 49'; Renatinho 70'	Stadium: Bluetongue Stadium; Attendance: 9,419; Referee: Ravshan Irmatov (Uzbekistan)

21 April 2009 Group Stage	Kawasaki Frontale (Japan)	2 – 1	(Australia) Central Coast Mariners	Kawasaki, Japan
JST	Igawa (yellow card) 19'; Juninho 47'; Mori (yellow card) 73'; Renatinho 81'	Report	Boogaard (yellow card) 39'; Osman (yellow card) 39'; Simon 59'; Clark (yellow card) 79'; Gumprecht (yellow card) 84'	Stadium: Todoroki Athletics Stadium; Attendance: 8,419; Referee: Fareed Al-Marzouqi (United Arab Emirates)

5 May 2009 Group Stage	Pohang Steelers (South Korea)	3 – 2	(Australia) Central Coast Mariners	Pohang, South Korea
13:00 (KST	Denílson 8' (pen.), 71', 88'	Report	Bojić (yellow card) 7'; Simon (yellow card) 27'; Kwasnik 54', 57'	Stadium: Pohang Steel Yard; Attendance: 11,539; Referee: Masoud Moradi (Iran)

19 May 2009 Group Stage	Central Coast Mariners (Australia)	0 – 1	(China) Tianjin Teda	Gosford, Australia
20:00 (AEST	Caceres (yellow card) 90+5'	Report	Han Yanming (yellow card) 12'; Ma Leilei (yellow card) 34'; Mao Biao 64'; Zhao Yanming (yellow card) 90+3'; Fan Baiqun (yellow card) 90+4'	Stadium: Bluetongue Stadium; Attendance: 5,843; Referee: Muhsen Basma (Syria)

==== Newcastle Jets ====
10 March 2009 Group Stage	Beijing Guoan (China)	2–0	(Australia) Newcastle Jets	Beijing, China
20:00	R. Griffiths 7'; Du Wenhui 90'	Report		Stadium: Workers Stadium; Attendance: 31,895; Referee: Mohsen Basma (Syria)

17 March 2009 Group Stage	Newcastle Jets (Australia)	2–0	(South Korea) Ulsan Hyundai	Newcastle, Australia
20:00	Petrovski 15' 43'	Report		Stadium: EnergyAustralia Stadium; Attendance: 7,415; Referee: Masoud Moradi

7 April 2009 Group Stage	Nagoya Grampus (Japan)	1–1	(Australia) Newcastle Jets	Nagoya, Japan
19:00	Tamada 65'	Report	Elrich 9'	Stadium: Mizuho Athletic Stadium; Attendance: 7,198; Referee: Khalil Al Ghamdi (Saudi Arabia)

22 April 2009 Group Stage	Newcastle Jets (Australia)	0–1	(Japan) Nagoya Grampus	Newcastle, Australia
			Ogawa 57'	Stadium: EnergyAustralia Stadium; Attendance: 8,492; Referee: Ali Hamad Madhad Saif Albadwawi

6 May 2009 Group Stage	Newcastle Jets (Australia)	2–1	(China) Beijing Guoan	Newcastle, Australia
	Petrovski 88'; Rooney 90+4'		R. Griffiths 69'	Stadium: EnergyAustralia Stadium; Attendance: 6,106; Referee: A. M. Hussein Abdulrahman

20 May 2009 Group Stage	Ulsan Hyundai (South Korea)	0–1	(Australia) Newcastle Jets	Ulsan, South Korea
			Hoffman 36'	Stadium: Munsu Cup Stadium; Referee: Abdul Malik bin Abdul Bashir

24 June 2009 Round of 16	Pohang Steelers (South Korea)	6–0	(Australia) Newcastle United Jets	Pohang, South Korea
19:30 (UTC+9)	Denilson 9' (pen.); Choi Hyo-Jin 15' 63' 72'; Kim Jae-Sung 56'; Ristić 85'	Report		Stadium: Steelyard Stadium; Attendance: 15,253; Referee: Subkhiddin Mohd Salleh (Malaysia)

== National teams ==
=== Men's senior ===
==== Friendlies ====
19 August 2008 Friendly	Australia	2–2	South Africa	London, England
	Sterjovski 25'; Kennedy 38'	(Report)	Nkosi 21'; Modise 58'	Stadium: Loftus Road; Attendance: 10,000; Referee: Howard Webb (England)

6 September 2008 Friendly	Netherlands	1–2	Australia	Eindhoven, Netherlands
	Huntelaar 6'	(Report)	Kewell 45+1' (pen.); Kennedy 76'	Stadium: Philips Stadion; Attendance: 22,500; Referee: Martin Atkinson (England)

==== FIFA World Cup qualification ====
10 September 2008 Fourth round	Uzbekistan	0–1	Australia	Tashkent, Uzbekistan
		[ (Report)]	Chipperfield 26'	Stadium: Pakhtakor Stadium; Attendance: 34,000; Referee: Saad Kamil Al-Fadhli (Kuwait)

15 October 2008 Fourth round	Australia	4–0	Qatar	Brisbane, Australia
	Cahill 8'; Emerton 17', 58'; Kennedy 76'	[ (Report)]		Stadium: Suncorp Stadium; Attendance: 34,320; Referee: Khalil Al Ghamdi Saudi Arabia

19 November 2008 Fourth round	Bahrain	0–1	Australia	Manama, Bahrain
		[ (Report)]	Bresciano 90+3'	Stadium: National Stadium; Attendance: 10,000; Referee: Masoud Moradi (Iran)

11 February 2009 Fourth round	Japan	0–0	Australia	Yokohama, Japan
19:20 UTC+09:00		Report		Stadium: International Stadium; Attendance: 66,000; Referee: Muhsen Basma (Syria)

1 April 2009 Fourth round	Australia	2–0	Uzbekistan	Sydney, Australia
20:00 UTC+11:00	Kennedy 66'; Kewell 73' (pen.)	Report		Stadium: Stadium Australia; Attendance: 59,292; Referee: Ali Hamad Al-Badwawi (United Arab Emirates)

6 June 2009 Fourth round	Qatar	0–0	Australia	Doha, Qatar
19:00 UTC+03:00		Report		Stadium: Jassim Bin Hamad Stadium; Attendance: 7,000; Referee: Abdul Malik Bashir (Singapore)

10 June 2009 Fourth round	Australia	2–0	Bahrain	Sydney, Australia
20:00 UTC+10:00	Sterjovski 55'; Carney 88'	Report		Stadium: Stadium Australia; Attendance: 39,450; Referee: Abdullah Al Hilali (Oman)

17 June 2009 Fourth round	Australia	2–1	Japan	Melbourne, Australia
20:20 UTC+10:00	Cahill 59', 77'	Report	Tulio 40'	Stadium: MCG; Attendance: 69,238; Referee: Khalil Al Ghamdi (Saudi Arabia)

==== AFC Asian Cup qualification ====
28 January 2009	Indonesia	0–0	Australia	Jakarta, Indonesia
19:30 (UTC+07:00)		Report		Stadium: Gelora Bung Karno Stadium; Attendance: 50,000; Referee: Malik Abdul Bashir (Singapore)

5 March 2009	Australia	0–1	Kuwait	Canberra, Australia
20:00 (UTC+11:00)		Report	38' Neda	Stadium: Canberra Stadium; Attendance: 20,032; Referee: Masoud Moradi (Iran)

=== Men's under-23 ===
==== Friendlies ====
12 July 2008	Australia	3–2	New Zealand	Sydney, Australia
14:00	Milligan 26', 79'; Sarkies 38'	Report	Brockie 28', 52'	Stadium: North Sydney Oval; Attendance: 2,312; Referee: Strebre Delovski (Australia)

20 July 2008	China	1–0	Australia	Changchun, China
	Zhao Xuri 78'	Report		Stadium: Changchun City Stadium

24 July 2008	Japan	2–1	Australia	Kobe, Japan
	Kagawa 42'; Okazaki 90'	Report	Thompson 35'

31 July 2008	South Korea	1–0	Australia	Seoul, South Korea
	Shin Young-rok 24'	Report

==== Olympics ====
7 August 2008 Group stage	Australia	1–1	Serbia	Shanghai, China
17:00 (UTC+08:00)	Zadkovich 69'	Report	Rajković 78'	Stadium: Shanghai Stadium; Attendance: 36,184; Referee: Jerome Damon (South Africa)

10 August 2008 Group stage	Argentina	1–0	Australia	Shanghai, China
17:00 (UTC+08:00)	Lavezzi 76'	Report		Stadium: Shanghai Stadium; Attendance: 38,182; Referee: Viktor Kassai (Hungary)

13 August 2008 Group stage	Ivory Coast	1–0	Australia	Tianjin, China
19:45 (UTC+08:00)	Kalou 81'	Report		Stadium: Tianjin Olympic Center Stadium; Attendance: 50,437; Referee: Jair Marrufo (United States)

=== Men's under-20 ===
==== Friendlies ====
23 August 2008	Japan	0–0 (5–4 p)	Australia	Shizuoka, Japan
		Report

26 August 2008	Australia	0–2	Argentina	Shizuoka, Japan
		Report

26 May 2009	Australia	1–3	Egypt	Terborg, Netherlands
	Nichols 65'	Report

==== AFF U-19 Youth Championship ====
5 October 2008 Group stage	Australia	3–1	China	Bangkok, Thailand
19:30 (UTC+07:00)	Lujic 6', 18'; Nichols 74'	Report	Piao Cheng 3'	Stadium: Rajamangala Stadium

7 October 2009 Group stage	South Korea	0–0	Australia	Bangkok, Thailand
17:00 (UTC+07:00)		Report		Stadium: Rajamangala Stadium

9 October 2009 Group stage	Thailand	1–2	Australia	Bangkok, Thailand
19:30 (UTC+07:00)	Jaroensuk 76'	Report	Nichols 52'; Elasi 61'	Stadium: Rajamangala Stadium

11 October 2008 Final	Australia	0–0 (3–1 p)	South Korea	Bangkok, Thailand
19:30 (UTC+07:00)		Report		Stadium: Rajamangala Stadium
	Penalties
	Elasi (penalty missed); Ryall (penalty scored); Naidovski (penalty scored); Minniecon (penalty missed); Holland (penalty scored)		Lee Chang-ho (penalty missed); Park Jong-woo (penalty missed); Yang Jun-a (penalty missed); Kim Jae-min (penalty scored)

==== AFC U-19 Championship ====
1 November 2008 Group stage	Australia	1–0	Thailand	Khobar, Saudi Arabia
18:45 (UTC+03:00)	Munro 20'	Report		Stadium: Prince Saud bin Jalawi Stadium; Attendance: 150; Referee: Kim Dong-Jin (South Korea)

3 November 2008 Group stage	Uzbekistan	1–1	Australia	Khobar, Saudi Arabia
16:15 (UTC+03:00)	Karimov 37'	Report	Minniecon 48'	Stadium: Prince Saud bin Jalawi Stadium; Attendance: 250; Referee: Mahmood Al-Ghatrifi (Oman)

5 November 2008 Group stage	Jordan	1–2	Australia	Dammam, Saudi Arabia
18:45 (UTC+03:00)	Bani Attiah 81'	Report	Lujic 40'; Ryall 71' (pen.)	Stadium: Prince Mohamed bin Fahd Stadium; Attendance: 150; Referee: Hedayat Mombeini (Iran)

8 November 2008 Quarterfinal	Australia	2–1 (a.e.t.)	North Korea	Khobar, Saudi Arabia
19:30 (UTC+03:00)	Nichols 12', 115'	Report	Myong Cha-Hyon 54'	Stadium: Prince Saud bin Jalawi Stadium; Attendance: 50; Referee: Valentin Kovalenko (Uzbekistan)

11 November 2008 Semifinal	United Arab Emirates	3–0	Australia	Dammam, Saudi Arabia
19:30 (UTC+03:00)	Khalil 4'; Essa 12'; Haikal 85'	Report		Stadium: Prince Mohamed bin Fahd Stadium; Attendance: 1,000; Referee: Hiroyoshi Takayama (Japan)

=== Men's under-17 ===
==== Friendlies ====
7 December 2008	United States	3–3	Australia	Los Angeles, United States
11:00 (UTC−08:00)	Sarle 10', 42'; Gyau 61'	Report	Stanojevic 7'; Costa 9'; Bulut 68' (pen.)	Attendance: 864

8 December 2008	Australia	1–4	Brazil	Los Angeles, United States
13:00 (UTC−08:00)	Sidimar 43' (o.g.)	Report	Willen 9'; Neymar 20'; Giovani 52', 67'	Attendance: 267

10 April 2009	Australia	3–2	Japan	Canberra, Australia
	Da Silva 2', 62'; Proia 30'	Report	Hayakawa 10'; Kanda 37'	Stadium: Australian Institute of Sport; Attendance: 300; Referee: Richard Naumovski (Australia)

12 April 2009	Australia	2–2	Japan	Canberra, Australia
	Hayakawa 50'; Hirasawa 79'	Report	Makarounas 66'; Musa 75'	Stadium: Australian Institute of Sport

24 April 2009	Turkey	1–0	Australia	Çanakkale, Turkey
	Sayan 64'	Report		Attendance: 1,000; Referee: Zafer Koçbay (Turkey)

26 April 2009	Turkey	2–1	Australia	Çanakkale, Turkey
	Akçakın 63', 80+1'	Report	Bulut 48'	Attendance: 1,000; Referee: Ayberk Altunay

==== AFF U-16 Youth Championship ====
9 July 2008 Group stage	Australia	2–1	Bahrain	Jakarta, Indonesia
16:00 (UTC+07:00)	Ibrahim 34'; Lum 88' (pen.)	Report	Saeed 20'	Stadium: Lebak Bulus Stadium

11 July 2008 Group stage	Indonesia	0–6	Australia	Jakarta, Indonesia
19:00 (UTC+07:00)		Report	Hamill 15'; Bulut 25'; Yabio 32'; Muhammad Abduh Lestaluhu 48' (o.g.); Ibrahim 57'; Costa 83'	Stadium: Lebak Bulus Stadium

13 July 2008 Group stage	Australia	4–1	Malaysia	Jakarta, Indonesia
16:00 (UTC+07:00)	Ibrahim 51', 55'; Bulut 83', 90'	Report	D. Saarvindran 62'	Stadium: Lebak Bulus Stadium

15 July 2008 Group stage	Singapore	1–1	Australia	Jakarta, Indonesia
19:00 (UTC+07:00)	Muhammad Muhaymin Salim 46'	Report	Bulut 42'	Stadium: Lebak Bulus Stadium

19 July 2008 Final	Australia	1–1 (a.e.t.) (5–4 p)	Bahrain	Jakarta, Indonesia
19:00 (UTC+07:00)	Warren 87'	Report	Ali Muneer Redha 44'	Stadium: Lebak Bulus Stadium

==== AFC U-16 Championship ====
5 October 2008 Group stage	Saudi Arabia	1–3	Australia	Tashkent, Uzbekistan
20:00 (UTC+05:00)	Al-Ghamdi 83'	Report	Domenici 14', 30'; Hamill 49'	Stadium: Pakhtakor Stadium; Attendance: 1,000; Referee: Valentin Kovalenko (Uzbekistan)

7 October 2008 Group stage	Australia	2–1	China	Tashkent, Uzbekistan
16:00 (UTC+05:00)	Lum 16' (pen.); Ibrahim 50'	Report	Jin Jingdao 45+1' (pen.)	Stadium: Pakhtakor Stadium; Attendance: 4,000; Referee: Mohsen Torky (Iran)

9 October 2008 Group stage	Australia	6–0	Turkmenistan	Tashkent, Uzbekistan
15:00 (UTC+05:00)	Kantarovski 7'; Yabio 32'; Gapare 43' 48'; Petratos 63'; Warren 65'	Report		Stadium: MHSK Stadium; Attendance: 3,000; Referee: Salem Mujghef (Jordan

12 October 2008 Quarterfinal	Australia	2–3	United Arab Emirates	Tashkent, Uzbekistan
14:00 (UTC+05:00)	Kantarovski 48'; Sainsbury 57'	Report	Salim 7' 62'; Mohammad 90+1'	Stadium: MHSK Stadium; Attendance: 500; Referee: Tojo (Japan)

=== Women's senior ===
==== Friendlies ====
5 July 2008	China	5–0	Australia	Tianjin, China
	Han Duan 7'; Zhang Ying 22'; Li Jie 48' (pen.); Xu Yuan 74', 87'	Report		Stadium: Tianjin Olympic Stadium Auxiliary Field; Attendance: 1,000

12 July 2008	Australia	1–0	New Zealand	Sydney, Australia
	Khamis 35'	Report		Stadium: North Sydney Oval; Attendance: 1,604; Referee: Krystyna Szokolai

24 July 2008	Japan	3–0	Australia	Kobe, Japan
	Sawa 43'; Nagasato 47'; Maruyama 86' (pen.)	Report		Stadium: Home's Stadium Kobe; Attendance: 9,195; Referee: Sook Hee Kim (South Korea)

31 January 2009	Australia	2–2	Italy	Sydney, Australia
	De Vanna 55'; Salisbury 65' (pen.)	Report	Conti 58'; Tuttino 78'	Stadium: Parramatta Stadium; Attendance: 2,921; Referee: Jacqui Melksham

7 February 2009	Australia	1–5	Italy	Canberra, Australia
	McCallum 64'	Report	Gabbiadini 7'; Panico 10', 58', 81'; Conti 16'	Stadium: Canberra Stadium; Attendance: 2,916; Referee: Sarah Hodson

==== AFF Women's Championship ====
9 October 2008 Group stage	Australia	2–0	Thailand	Ho Chi Minh City, Vietnam
	Balomenos 71', 86'	Report		Stadium: Thanh Long Sports Centre

11 October 2008 Group stage	Australia	7–0	Philippines	Ho Chi Minh City, Vietnam
	Rollason 34', 53'; Tristram 36', 81'; Sykes 65'; Balomenos 86', 90'	Report		Stadium: Thanh Long Sports Centre

13 October 2008 Group stage	Singapore	0–6	Australia	Ho Chi Minh City, Vietnam
		Report	Colthorpe 6', 22'; Sykes 51'; Tristram 69'; Balomenos 78'; Mastrantonio 90'	Stadium: Thanh Long Sports Centre

18 October 2008 Semi-final	Australia	5–1	Myanmar	Ho Chi Minh City, Vietnam
	Chapman 3'; Uzunlar 19'; Colthorpe 27' (pen.); Tristram 42'; Carroll 65' (pen.)	Report	unknown 72'	Stadium: Thanh Long Sports Centre

20 October 2008 Final	Vietnam	0–1	Australia	Ho Chi Minh City, Vietnam
		Report	80' (o.g.)	Stadium: Thanh Long Sports Centre

=== Women's under-20 ===
==== Friendlies ====
27 September 2008	Australia	2–1	China	Canberra, Australia
	Clifford 31', 82'	Report	Li Lin 10' (pen.)	Stadium: Australian Institute of Sport; Referee: Richard Naumovski (Australia)

29 September 2008	Australia	2–0	China	Canberra, Australia
	Butt 15'; Kerr 76'	Report		Stadium: Australian Institute of Sport; Referee: Chris Young (Australia)

25 May 2009	Australia	4–1	Finland	Varese, Italy
	Tabain 4'; Butt 7'; Seaman 78'; Bolger 80'	Report	Raihala 79'

26 May 2009	Australia	7–0	Finland	Varese, Italy
	Bolger 12'; Fimmano 15', 57', 70'; N. Sykes 21', 50', 52'	Report

27 May 2009	Australia	3–0	Germany	Varese, Italy
	Schult 37' (o.g.); Simon 75'; Bolger 89'	Report

6 June 2009	Thailand	0–1	Australia	Bangkok, Thailand
		Report	Fimmano 55'

==== AFC U-19 Women's Championship qualification ====
29 October 2008	Chinese Taipei	0–3	Australia	Kuala Lumpur, Malaysia
16:00 (UTC+08:00)		Report	Simon 35', 43'; Mastrantonio 58'	Stadium: KLFA Stadium; Attendance: 50; Referee: Rita Gani (Malaysia)

2 November 2011	Australia	18–0	India	Kuala Lumpur, Malaysia
16:00 (UTC+08:00)	Polias 7'; Kerr 9', 14'; Hogben 13', 20', 48', 69'; Sykes 22', 27', 37', 43'; Quigley 33', 52', 79'; Studman 78'; Simon 80'; Gorry 83' van Egmond 90+1'	Report		Stadium: KLFA Stadium; Attendance: 20; Referee: Shen Huang Ying (China PR)

5 November 2008	Iran	0–6	Australia	Kuala Lumpur, Malaysia
18:30 (UTC+08:00)		Report	Tabain 5'; Simon 11', 44' van Egmond 70'; Butt 79'; Kerr 90+1'	Stadium: KLFA Stadium; Attendance: 50; Referee: Rita Gani (Malaysia)

7 November 2008	Australia	1–2	Thailand	Kuala Lumpur, Malaysia
16:00 (UTC+08:00)	Quigley 25'	Report	Thongsombut 27'; Pittayanukulsup 47'	Stadium: KLFA Stadium; Attendance: 40; Referee: Shen Huang Ying (China PR)

=== Women's under-17 ===
==== AFC U-16 Women's Championship qualification ====
8 November 2008	Singapore	0–17	Australia	Kuala Lumpur, Malaysia
		Report	Foord 2', 16', 20', 23', 49', 77'; Hatzirodos 5', 10', 34'; Searl 8'; Allen 17', 40'; Wallace 67', 81', 89'; Azeman 77' (o.g.); Stott 87'	Stadium: MBPJ Stadium; Attendance: 150; Referee: Chaitali Paul (India)

10 November 2008	Australia	4–0	Myanmar	Kuala Lumpur, Malaysia
	Kerr 2'; Allen 48', 59'; Bolger 53'	Report		Stadium: MBPJ Stadium; Attendance: 80; Referee: Shen Huangying (China)

15 November 2008	Philippines	0–20	Australia	Kuala Lumpur, Malaysia
		Report	Hatzirodos 7', 43', 48'; Stott 13', 31'; Foord 16', 34', 44'; Wallace 22', 42'; Kennedy 29', 87'; Gibbons 58'; Searl 60'; Andrews 62', 72', 90'; Whitfield 54', 64', 80'	Stadium: MBPJ Stadium; Attendance: 150; Referee: Chaitali Paul (India)

17 November 2008	Australia	0–2	Thailand	Kuala Lumpur, Malaysia
		Report	van Egmond 49'; Andrews 89'	Stadium: MBPJ Stadium; Attendance: 300
