= Vedran Janjetović =

Croatian professional footballer (born 1987)

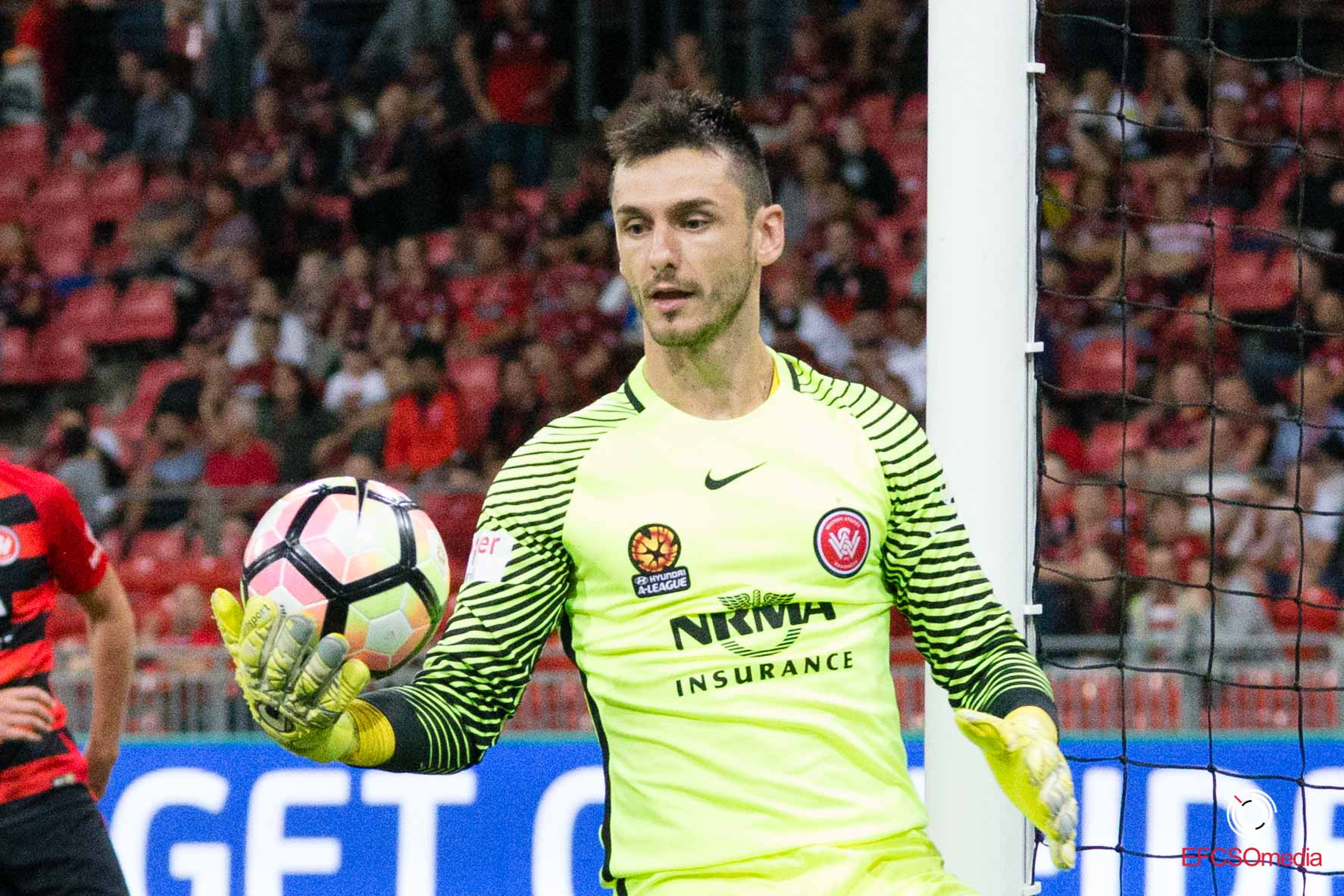
- Janjetović playing for Western Sydney Wanderers in 2017

Personal information
- Full name: Vedran Janjetović
- Date of birth: 20 August 1987 (age 39)
- Place of birth: Zagreb, SR Croatia, SFR Yugoslavia
- Height: 1.86 m (6 ft 1 in)
- Position: Goalkeeper

Team information
- Current team: St George FC
- Number: 13

Youth career
- 2002: Hurstville City Minotaurs
- 2003: Stanmore Hawks
- 2003–2004: Sydney Olympic
- 2004: APIA Leichhardt Tigers
- 2005: Hurstville City Minotaurs
- 2006: FC Bossy Liverpool
- 2007: Hurstville City Minotaurs
- 2007–2008: Sydney United
- 2008–2009: Sydney FC

Senior career*
| Years | Team | Apps | (Gls) |
| 2007 | NK Bjelovar | 7 | (0) |
| 2009–2012 | Sydney United | 74 | (0) |
| 2009 | → Brisbane Roar (loan) | 0 | (0) |
| 2012 | → Melbourne Heart (loan) | 0 | (0) |
| 2012–2017 | Sydney FC | 100 | (0) |
| 2017–2022 | Western Sydney Wanderers | 63 | (0) |
| 2024 | Wollongong Wolves | 30 | (0) |
| 2025–2026 | Sydney United | 18 | (0) |
| 2026 | St George FC | 5 | (0) |
- * Club domestic league appearances and goals as of 29 September 2026

Vedran Janjetović (Croatian pronunciation: [ʋědran janjěːtoʋitɕ]; born 20 August 1987) is a Croatian-Australian footballer who last played as a goalkeeper for National Premier Leagues NSW club St George FC.

== Club career ==
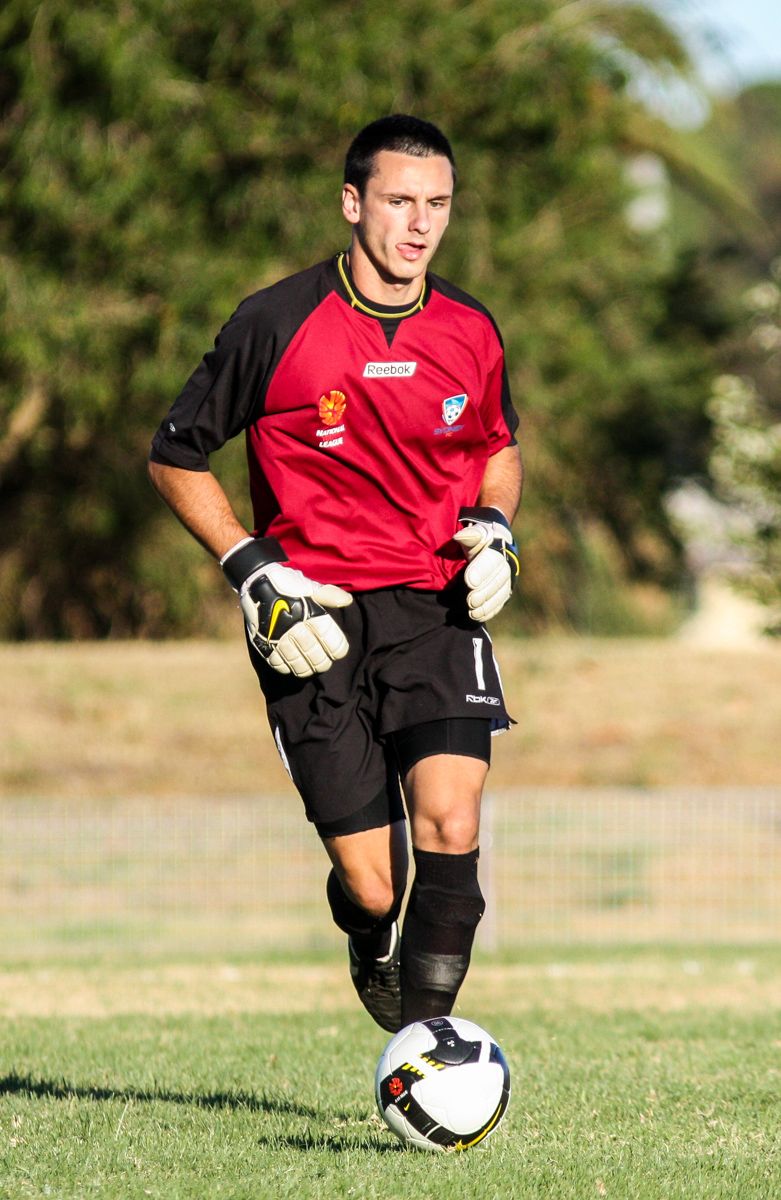
Janjetović in 2009

Janjetović started his career in the youth ranks at NSWPL club Sydney United before being spotted by Sydney FC and was signed to their Youth League squad alongside fellow young stars Matthew Jurman, Kofi Danning, Rhyan Grant and Anthony Golec. He helped Sydney FC to the inaugural title, making a significant impression on his peers with a number of good performances.

In 2010, he would return to Sydney United being too old to be eligible for a spot in Sydney FC's youth team and was not offered a senior team contract at the club due to an ongoing neurological issue in his right arm which forced him into an extended period on the sidelines. Later that year, Janjetović was loaned out to fellow A-League club Brisbane Roar as injury cover for Griffin McMaster as regular custodian Liam Reddy was out injured, however did not make an appearance for the Roar in his time at the club.

=== Melbourne Heart ===
Janjetović joined Melbourne Heart on a two-game loan stint for their Hawaiian Islands Invitational in February 2012. He played against both American club Colorado Rapids and Korean side Busan IPark.

=== Sydney FC ===
On 18 June 2012, it was announced that Janjetović had signed a two-year deal with Sydney FC to bolster their goalkeeping ranks. Janjetović trialled for a number of weeks at the club against former Gold Coast United goalkeeper Jerrad Tyson, QPR youth goalkeeper Aaron Lennox and Sutherland goalkeeper Nathan Denham. He eventually won out, impressing Sydney FC's goalkeeping coach Zeljko Kalac and manager Ian Crook. Janjetović was also in talks with the club's new cross-city rivals Western Sydney FC during his trial at Sydney FC but chose to sign with the Sky Blues, stating that his decision came down to the calibre of goalkeeping coach at the club as well as Sydney FC's interest and desire to have him in their squad. He made his Sydney FC debut on 2 December 2012 at Allianz Stadium keeping a clean sheet in Sydney's 0–0 draw with Melbourne Heart.

=== Western Sydney Wanderers ===
On 20 December 2016, it was announced that Janjetović signed an 18-month deal with Western Sydney Wanderers. He would rejoin his former goalkeeping coach Zeljko Kalac, stating that it played a large role in his switch to his former's cross-city rivals. The deal would be finalised the following year when the transfer window opened in January. In April 2018 he signed an extended contract to keep him at the Wanderers until 2022/23.

==== Injury and medical retirement ====
On 25 January 2019 the Wanderers faced Brisbane Roar for their Round 16 fixture. Leading 2-1 late in the game Janjetovic suffered an injury when diving to make a save against Adam Taggart. In stoppage time with seconds left in the game the ball was rolling away for a goal kick that would have used enough time for the Wanderers to win the match. Instead Janjetovic stuck a leg out for no apparent reason and miskicked the ball, knocking it out for a corner kick. Brisbane packed the penalty area for the set piece including sending their goalkeeper Jamie Young forward and were rewarded when Taggart got his head to the cross to send a bullet header flying into the goal to make it 2-2. It was widely reported as one of the biggest defensive mistakes in the history of the A-League. After playing the rest of the season on painkillers he eventually required surgery in June for a severe Rotator cuff tear injury. The initial prognosis of a 6 month lay-off became the entire 2019/2020 season and the 2020/21 season due to the recurring and severe injury requiring multiple surgical interventions. His place in goal was taken firstly by Daniel Lopar and then Daniel Margush. Janjetovic was released by the Wanderers at the conclusion of his contract when the 2021–22 A-League season finished with his injury forcing him into retirement as a football player.

=== Return from injury and retirement ===
In 2024 it was announced that following recovery from his rotator cuff injury, Janjetovic had signed a contract with Wollongong Wolves for the 2024 National Premier Leagues season.

== Career statistics ==
As of 7 September 2015

CS = Clean Sheets

| Club | Season | Division | League^{1} | | Cup | | International^{2} | | Total | |
| Club | Season | Division | Apps | CS | Apps | CS | Apps | CS | Apps | CS |
|---|---|---|---|---|---|---|---|---|---|---|
| NK Bjelovar | 2006–07 | Druga HNL | 7 | ? | 0 | 0 | — | | 7 | ? |
| NK Bjelovar | Total | | 7 | ? | 0 | 0 | — | | 7 | ? |
| Sydney United | 2009 | NSW Premier League | 22 | 6 | — | | — | | 22 | 6 |
| Sydney United | 2010 | NSW Premier League | 17 | 7 | — | | — | | 17 | 7 |
| Sydney United | 2011 | NSW Premier League | 23 | 6 | — | | — | | 23 | 6 |
| Sydney United | 2012 | NSW Premier League | 12 | 3 | — | | — | | 12 | 3 |
| Sydney United | Total | | 74 | 22 | — | | — | | 74 | 22 |
| Brisbane Roar | 2009–10 | A-League | 0 | 0 | — | | — | | 0 | 0 |
| Melbourne Heart | 2011–12 | A-League | 0 | 0 | — | | — | | 0 | 0 |
| Sydney FC | 2012–13 | A-League | 16 | 3 | — | | — | | 16 | 3 |
| Sydney FC | 2013–14 | A-League | 28 | 5 | — | | — | | 28 | 5 |
| Sydney FC | 2014–15 | A-League | 29 | 9 | 2 | 0 | — | | 31 | 9 |
| Sydney FC | 2015–16 | A-League | 27 | 8 | 2 | 1 | 0 | 0 | 29 | 9 |
| Sydney FC | Total | | 100 | 25 | 4 | 1 | 0 | 0 | 104 | 26 |
| Career Total | | | 181 | 47 | 4 | 1 | 0 | 0 | 185 | 48 |

^{1} – includes A-League final series statistics
^{2} – AFC Champions League statistics are included in season commencing during group stages (i.e. ACL 2014 and A-League season 2013–2014 etc.)

== Honours ==
Sydney FC:

- A-League National Youth League Premiers: 2008–09
- A-League National Youth League Champions: 2008–09

Sydney United:

- NSW Premier League Premiers: 2009
- Waratah Cup Champions: 2025
