= Kofi Danning =

Ghanaian-born Australian footballer (born 1991)

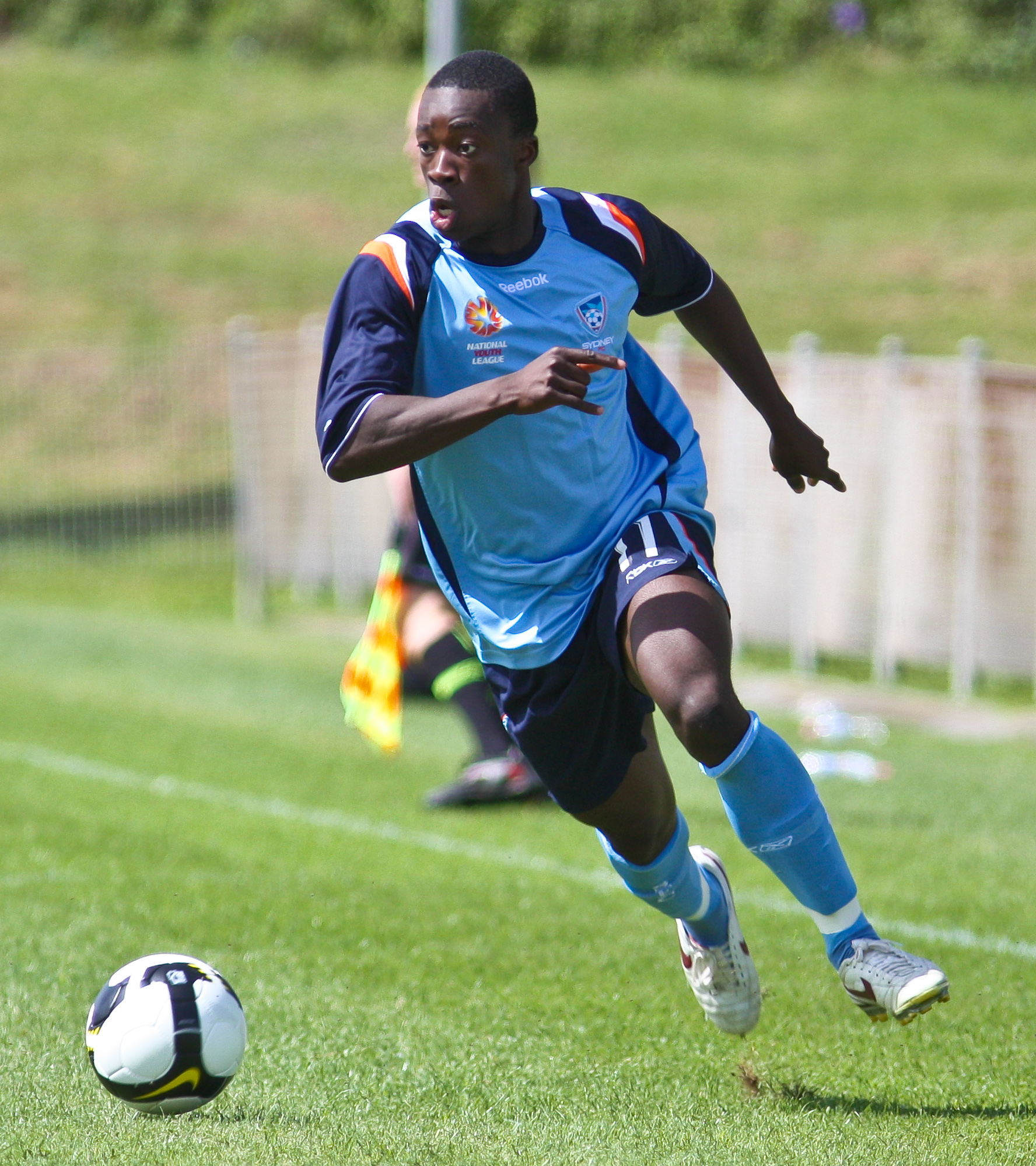
- Danning playing for Sydney FC Youth in 2008

Personal information
- Full name: Duke Kofi Appiah Danning
- Date of birth: 2 March 1991 (age 35)
- Place of birth: Kumasi, Ghana
- Height: 1.71 m (5 ft 7 in)
- Positions: Striker; right winger

Team information
- Current team: Belconnen United

Youth career
- Canberra FC
- 2007: O'Connor Knights
- 2007–2008: AIS
- 2008–2009: Sydney FC

Senior career*
Years	Team	Apps	(Gls)
2008	AIS	26	(9)
2009–2011	Sydney FC	22	(3)
2011–2012	Brisbane Roar	14	(1)
2012–2014	C.S. Visé	4	(0)
2014	→ Brisbane Roar NPL (loan)	7	(3)
2014–2015	→ Brisbane Roar (loan)	5	(1)
2015	Oakleigh Cannons	10	(0)
2016	Hume City	16	(1)
2017–2018	Canberra FC	30	(12)
2019	Canberra Olympic	16	(6)
2020	Belconnen United	10	(3)
2021–	Monaro Panthers	15	(2)

International career^{‡}
2009–2011	Australia U-20	30	(3)
2011–2012	Australia U-23	5	(1)
Medal record
Representing Australia
Men's Association football
AFC U-20 Asian Cup
Runner-up	2010 China
- * Club domestic league appearances and goals as of 9 November 2021 ‡ National team caps and goals as of 7 August 2011

Duke Kofi Appiah Danning (born 2 March 1991) is a Ghanaian-born Australian footballer who plays for National Premier Leagues club Belconnen United.

== Biography ==
=== Early life ===
Danning was born in Kumasi in southern central Ghana. Kofi's mother initially moved to Australia on her own, and Kofi lived in Kumasi with his grandmother and extended family until he was reunited with his mother in Canberra at the age of seven. Following his arrival in Canberra, he was educated Forrest Primary School, then followed on to High School at Telopea Park School in Barton, Australian Capital Territory making his mark on the school's sports teams. He later finished 11th and 12th grade under the talented sports program at Erindale College in Canberra.

=== Club career ===
After playing for Canberra FC and then the O'Connor Knights in the ACT Premier League, Danning was invited to train with the Australian Institute of Sport (AIS) squad in 2007. He impressed then coach Steve O'Connor and his successor Ray Junna enough to claim a full scholarship, and spent the following year with the AIS team.

=== Sydney FC ===
Following his appointment as Sydney FC youth coach for the inaugural National Youth League season, Steve O'Connor was quick to make Danning a member of his new squad. Danning was signed as a member of Sydney FC's inaugural National Youth League squad on 22 August 2008. He was later billeted with a Ghanaian family in Sydney's south to allow him to become more settled.

On 3 January 2009, Danning made his senior debut for Sydney FC against Adelaide United at the Adelaide Oval, appearing as a 71st-minute substitute for club captain Steve Corica. The game was won 2–0 by Adelaide United. On 11 January 2009, after he had come on as a 63rd-minute substitute for Adam Biddle, he scored his first senior goal for Sydney FC, an 85th-minute winner as Sydney FC defeated Wellington Phoenix 1–0 at the Sydney Football Stadium. Receiving the ball out on the left, Danning cut inside and squared the ball to Steve Corica. Corica then played a direct ball to Alex Brosque, who held off a defender on his back to flick the ball onto a flying Danning, who showed great poise to toe poke it past Phoenix and New Zealand national football team goalkeeper Glen Moss.

The following week, Kofi Danning made his starting debut against Queensland Roar at Suncorp Stadium, and scored his second senior goal in the 25th minute of the game. Young defender Rhyan Grant rounded his Roar opponent and crossed deep for Danning, who sent a beautiful looping header over the outstretched arms of Roar goalkeeper Griffin McMaster to level the scores at 1–1. However, Sydney FC went on to lose 3–1, a result which ended their slim hopes of qualifying for the A-League 2008–09 finals series. Danning also appeared as a 69th-minute substitute for Shannon Cole in Sydney FC's final game of the A-League season, a 4–0 win over the last-placed Newcastle Jets at the Sydney Football Stadium on 25 January 2009.

Danning finished the A-League 2008–09 season with four senior appearances and two senior goals. He wore shirt number 35 in these four matches. Following his promotion to the senior squad in January 2009, Danning signed a two-year contract with Sydney FC. He has been given shirt number 11 for the A-League 2009–10 season.

Although the A-League season ended in disappointment for Sydney FC's seniors, it was a very different story for the club's National Youth League squad, who finished as champions for the 2008–09 season. Kofi Danning made 16 appearances for the National Youth League team during the season, scoring four goals. After they had clinched the National Youth League minor premiership by winning 13 and drawing two of their 18 regular season games, Sydney FC progressed to the Grand Final where they met Adelaide United at Hindmarsh Stadium in Adelaide on 21 February 2009. Despite their opponents' home advantage, Sydney FC ran out deserving 2–0 winners, with Kofi Danning's strong work in the penalty area leading to Robbie Mileski's sealing goal in the 77th minute. In Danning's first game for the 2009–10 season against North Queensland Fury, Danning was involved in all 3 goals for the visitors with 1 goal and 2 assists. The result of this game was a 3–2 win to Sydney FC.

Danning tore the anterior cruciate ligament in his right knee during a match against Melbourne Victory in December 2009 and is expected to be out of action for up to nine months. Danning revealed he had the chance to re-sign with Sydney, but could not see his plight getting any better under Sky Blues coach Vitezslav Lavicka.

=== Brisbane Roar ===
On 27 June 2011, Danning signed a two-year deal with A-League club Brisbane Roar. He made his Roar debut off the bench in the side's 1–0 win over Central Coast Mariners. Kofi went on to make another 3 appearances throughout the season, before earning his fifth appearance when he was substituted on the field in the 69th minute for youngster Patrick Theodore against the Newcastle Jets. In the 71st minute of the game, Danning provided the opening goal with his first touch of the game. In May 2015, it was confirmed that Danning had been released from Brisbane Roar to join NPL side Oakleigh Cannons.

=== C.S. Visé ===
It was announced at an open training session on 5 August 2012 that he had been transferred to C.S. Visé in Belgium, a sister club of Brisbane, both sharing the same owners. Prior to the 2013–14 Season, Danning was required to undergo a full knee reconstruction following a serious knee injury. He was allowed to return to previous club, Brisbane Roar, to complete his rehabilitation whilst still remaining contracted to Vise under an agreement made possible due to the common ownership of the two clubs.

=== National Premier Leagues Victoria ===
In May 2015, Danning joined National Premier Leagues Victoria side Oakleigh Cannons FC on a free transfer. Danning departed Oakleigh after just half a season, joining title hopefuls Hume City FC for the 2016 season.

== International career ==
Born in Ghana but a resident of Australia since 1999, Danning had been caught up in FIFA's recent edict to tighten its international eligibility rules. After almost a year of lobbying by the FFA on the basis that genuine immigrants should not be penalised, FIFA declared in August 2009 that Danning would be granted an exemption and cleared to play for the Young Socceroos in the 2009 Under 20 World Cup in Egypt. He was a member of the Australian under 19s squad that played in Indonesia in the AFC Qualification phase.

On 7 March 2011 he was selected to represent the Australia Olympic football team in an Asian Olympic Qualifier match against Iraq.

== Career statistics ==
Club	Season	Division	League			Cup			Continental			Total		
Club	Season	Division	Apps	Goals	Assists	Apps	Goals	Assists	Apps	Goals	Assists	Apps	Goals	Assists
Sydney FC	2008–09	A-League	3	2	0	0	0	0	0	0	0	3	2	0
Sydney FC	2009–10	A-League	7	1	1	0	0	0	0	0	0	7	1	1
Sydney FC	2010–11	A-League	12	0	0	0	0	0	4	0	0	16	0	0
Sydney FC total			22	3	1	0	0	0	4	0	0	26	3	1
Brisbane Roar	2011–12	A-League	12	1	3	0	0	0	3	0	1	15	1	4
Brisbane Roar total			12	1	3	0	0	0	3	0	1	15	1	3
C.S. Visé	2012–13	Belgian Second Division	4	0	0	0	0	0	0	0	0	4	0	0
C.S. Visé total			4	0	0	0	0	0	0	0	0	4	0	0
Career total			38	4	4	0	0	0	7	0	1	45	4	5

== Honours ==
Sydney FC

- A-League Premiership: 2009–10
- A-League Championship: 2009–10
- National Youth League Championship: 2008–09

Australia U-20

- AFC U-20 Asian Cup: runner-up 2010
- International Cor Groenewegen Tournament (U-20): 2009
