= Marco Tilio =

Australian soccer player (born 2001)

Personal information
- Full name: Marco Tilio
- Date of birth: 23 August 2001 (age 25)
- Place of birth: Hurstville, New South Wales, Australia
- Height: 1.60 m (5 ft 3 in)
- Position: Winger

Team information
- Current team: Rapid Wien
- Number: 7

Youth career
- –2010: Leichhardt Saints FC
- 2011–2013: APIA Leichhardt
- 2014–2015: Sydney Olympic
- 2016–2018: Sydney FC

Senior career*
| Years | Team | Apps | (Gls) |
| 2019 | Sydney FC NPL | 16 | (5) |
| 2019–2020 | Sydney FC | 3 | (1) |
| 2020–2023 | Melbourne City | 70 | (14) |
| 2021 | Melbourne City NPL | 2 | (1) |
| 2023–2025 | Celtic | 2 | (0) |
| 2024–2025 | → Melbourne City (loan) | 23 | (6) |
| 2025– | Rapid Wien | 21 | (3) |

International career^{‡}
| 2019 | Australia U20 | 13 | (12) |
| 2021– | Australia U23 | 7 | (1) |
| 2022– | Australia | 10 | (0) |
Medal record
Men's football
Representing Australia
AFF U-19 Youth Championship
| First place | 2019 Vietnam | U-20 Team |
- * Club domestic league appearances and goals as of 24 October 2026 ‡ National team caps and goals as of 10 June 2025

Marco Tilio (born 23 August 2001) is an Australian professional soccer player who plays as a winger for Austrian Football Bundesliga club Rapid Wien and the Australia national team.

== Early life ==
Tilio was born on 23 August 2001 in Hurstville, a suburb in Southern Sydney, to Michael and Melina Tilio. Shortly after birth, he was diagnosed with bacterial meningitis, which required a month-long hospital stay before his discharge. At the age of six weeks, he returned to the hospital due to the after-effects of hydrocephalus, where he received ongoing monitoring by neurosurgeons until the age of one.

At the age of six, Tilio began playing club football by joining Enfield Rovers in the junior leagues. During his childhood, Tilio soon moved with Leichhardt Saints, and later joined the youth system at APIA Leichhardt, initially with the juniors, before transitioning to the NPL youth side in 2011. He further progressed to Sydney Olympic before finally earning an opportunity to play for his hometown club, Sydney FC.

== Club career ==
=== Sydney FC ===
==== 2018–2020: Youth ====
Since joining the club in October 2015, Tilio signed his first professional contract, a one-year scholarship deal, with Sydney FC on 11 September 2018.

Tilio made his NPL senior debut on 10 March 2019, and scored the opening goal, for Sydney FC NPL side in a 2–1 win over Hakoah. Four months later, on 7 July, he scored his 4th and 5th goal of the season, with two goals in the span of two minutes, to win the game 3–1 against Rockdale Ilinden. His contributions proved pivotal as Tilio helped Sydney FC clinched survival for another season following a crucial win over Sydney United.

In November, he was announced in the Sydney FC Youth squad for the 2019–20 Foxtel Youth League. During the competition, Tilio scored a hat-trick, his second of the week following his first during international duty, in an 8–3 win against Newcastle Jets. After progressing to the final, Tilio would score two goals, including a brace, to win the Y-League after a 5–1 victory over Melbourne Victory. He was awarded the FYL Golden Boot for his tally of 11 goals.

==== 2019–2020: Senior ====
On 21 May 2019, Tilio made his professional debut in the AFC Champions League in a 4–0 loss against Kawasaki Frontale at Jubilee Stadium. In September, he was promoted to the senior squad alongside Ryan Teague and Harry Van der Saag, ahead of the 2019–20 A-League season. His time with the seniors was described by Adam Le Fondre as "a rollercoaster," but proclaims its normal with youngsters.

On 23 February 2020, Tilio scored on his A-League debut, to secure a 3–1 win over Central Coast Mariners and send his side 13 points clear at the top of the table. On 7 September, after making 6 appearances and scoring 1 goal, Tilio departed Sydney FC to find better playing time, rejecting the contract offer made by Steve Corica.

=== Melbourne City ===
On 21 September 2020, Melbourne City announced that Tilio had signed a three-year contract with the club, having been assured for more first-team opportunities. He received the number 23 for the 2020–21 A-League season that commenced at the start of 2021 instead of late-2020 due to COVID.

==== 2020–21: Winning the double ====
Following Adrián Luna's suspension and Andrew Nabbout's absence from injury, Tilio made his Melbourne City debut on 3 January 2021, in a starting appearance against Adelaide United. On 5 April, he scored his first goal, 3 minutes after emerging from the bench, to net the winning goal in the 83rd minute and secure a 3–2 away win over Wellington Phoenix. On 17 April, after being brought off the bench in the 63rd minute in his first Melbourne Derby, Tilio recorded two assists and won a penalty that helped Jamie Maclaren complete his sixth hat-trick in his league career. By full time, City won 7–0 against Melbourne Victory at AAMI Park, breaking the record for the biggest win in derby history and tying with Adelaide United for the biggest win in A-League history. The win also led their rival's coach Grant Brebner to resign soon after.

With Nabbout's frequent injuries, initially a groin followed by a leg injury, led Tilio to make more frequent appearances in the starting line-up. On 22 May, Tilio assisted the winning goal to Luna in a 1–0 win against Central Coast Mariners, leading to City's first silverware in the club's history after winning the A-League Premiership Plate. Tilio registered 4 assists and 1 goal at the end of the regular league fixtures, in which he started in 8 of 20 league appearances. In the A-League semi-final on 20 June, Tilio assisted the opening goal, a cross towards Stefan Colakovski, and scored a brace within a minute later to secure a 2–0 victory over Macarthur.

During the Grand Final, Tilio garnered media attention, in what was described as a "wow moment to be worshipped," when he trapped the ball whilst sliding, twisting his knee behind his back to stop the ball before it went out in the touchline before getting up and continuing the City attack. His performances helped City secure a 3–1 win over his former side Sydney FC, and was given their first A-League Championship in their history. At the end of the season, Tilio was award the club's Rising Star accolade, and was nominated among four other A-League players, including teammate and eventual winner Connor Metcalfe for the Harry Kewell Medal.

==== 2021–22: Back-to-back Premierships ====
On 20 October 2021, Tilio signed a two-year extension with Melbourne City, tying him with the club until the 2023–24 season. The early stages of the season saw Tilio registering only ten passes and one key chance in the opening league match and an early missed penalty in an FFA Cup match against Hume City. Despite being replaced by Florin Berenguer in recent matches, Tilio kept his place in the starting line-up before the Christmas break following a 2–2 Melbourne Derby draw on 18 December where he got an assist. On 5 January 2022, in the FFA Cup quarter-final, Melbourne City were knocked out from the competition after losing on penalties following a 0–0 draw against Wellington Phoenix at the end of extra time. Tilio missed the deciding penalty for City when Alex Paulsen saved his shot before Nicholas Pennington scored the winning penalty for the Phoenix to win it 4–3 in the shootout.

In the subsequent match four days later, Tilio scored his first goal for the season in a 3–3 draw to Western Sydney Wanderers. Following his return from international duty, on 18 February, Tilio assisted twice, to both Mathew Leckie and Carl Jenkinson, in a 3–0 win against Newcastle, sending his side to the top of the ladder. In the next match against Central Coast Mariners, just four days later, he was involved in a controversy after a VAR decision gave his side a penalty when a Mariners' defender brought down Tilio outside the box. Maclaren converted the penalty to give his side the equaliser. Up until the 74th minute, the game was held 2–2 when Tilio scored the winning goal to secure a 3–2 win at home. Following the match, the Football Australia (FA) referee department admitted that referee Shaun Evans got it wrong in the two controversial decisions that cost the Central Coast Mariners, and said that City's penalty should not have been awarded due to the secondary contact in the area being "negligible" as well a penalty that should have been awarded to the Mariners in the 87th minute due to a foul on Lewis Miller that was not given.

On 2 April, Tilio scored twice in five minutes off the bench in a 6–0 win against Wellington. On 18 April, Tilio scored two goals in his second AFC Champions League appearance, securing a City's first win in a continental competition in a 3–0 victory over United City. In the returning away match on 30 April, Tilio made his 50th appearance for City and scored his third brace of the month, after a Maclaren pass led him for a close-ranged finish to goal, in a repeated 3–0 victory against United City, but just missing out on the knockout stages on goal difference despite finishing the group stage undefeated.

After leading City to their second consecutive Premiership, Tilio scored the equaliser in the semi-final second leg against Adelaide United, leading them into extra time where Maclaren scored the winning goal to send his side to the Grand Final against Western United. He played in the final where City lost 2–0 in front of 22,495 at AAMI Park. Tilio finished his second breakout season under Patrick Kisnorbo with 8 goals and 8 assists in all competitions. He was nominated for the Harry Kewell Medal for the second time, losing it to Toulouse midfielder Denis Genreau.

==== 2022–23: Third consecutive title ====
Ahead of the 2022–23 A-League, Tilio was delegated back to the bench in City's season opener against champions Western United. During a press conference on his decision to bench Tilio, Kisnorbo made it clear that the winger, despite being a Socceroo, didn't guarantee playing time and told Tilio he had to work to earn his place. This repeated in the next round against Brisbane Roar as Tilio was instead brought on at stoppage time due to Taras Gomulka red card leading to a change in tactics. Kisnorbo defended his decisions saying, “Marco was supposed to come on – it is what it is. I'll pick the players and coach the players and do the subs what's relevant to the game. I thought that was relevant.” adding, "I’ll do my best to coach the team in the best way possible, and do what’s right for Melbourne City." With only 20 minutes in the domestic league, Tilio's chances of making it to the World Cup squad for Australia was described by reporters and pundits as "hanging by a thread" although Leckie ensured him to concentrate and work hard.

In the following three games, Tilio registered a goal each in the games against Wellington Phoenix and Perth Glory, helping his side to a 2–2 draw, and securing a 4–0 win respectively. However, he would initially miss out on the final World Cup squad in November, before being called-up just days later. On 7 January 2023, Tilio earned the Man of the match by scoring the opening goal with a remarkable solo run from the halfway line. Later, he assisted Maclaren's 10th goal of the season, contributing to a resounding 4–0 victory over Western United. He repeated this performance on 25 February, during a league match against Sydney FC, Tilio dribbled from his team's half of the pitch to score a goal from outside the box, increasing the lead to 2–0. In the 30th minute, Tilio went on to assist Maclaren's brace before the match concluded with a 3–2 victory for City. As March came to a close, Tilio's goal tally reached 5, along with numerous assists, solidifying his belief that he was ready for European football as he announced his intention to depart Melbourne by the end of the season.

On 10 April, Tilio scored twice in a 4–0 win over Wellington Phoenix, separating City by 7 points ahead of second-place Adelaide. In the final round on 28 April, Tilio scored twice again, including the winning goal in the 93rd minute, to help City make a 3–2 comeback against Western Sydney Wanderers, leading his side to their third consecutive Premiership Plate – becoming the first club to ever do so. Tilio also became the first A-League Men player to win the title four consecutive times since he had won it with Sydney FC in 2019–20. He was named April nominee for Young Footballer of the Year. In the A-League semi final, Tilio scored his 20th goal for City after securing a 4–0 win (5–1 in aggregate) against Sydney FC. He played his last game for the club on 3 June, in the 6–1 Grand Final loss to Central Coast Mariners at CommBank Stadium.

=== Celtic ===
On 30 June 2023, Tilio signed a five-year contract with Scottish club Celtic, after completing a reported transfer in excess of £1.5 million. The transfer fee paid was the highest ever for a player in A-League, breaking the Australian soccer transfer fee record, set by the sale of Tilio's teammate Jordan Bos in the same month. Injuries deprived him from making his debut for the Hoops, before he finally came off the bench as a stoppage-time replacement for Yang Hyun-jun against St Mirren on 25 November 2023. His only other appearance came in a 4-1 victory over Hibernian ten days later, where he again came on as a substitute, this time for Mikey Johnston in the 63rd minute.

==== Melbourne City loan ====
On 1 February 2024, Tilio returned to the A-League Men, signing a loan deal with Melbourne City for the remainder of the 2023–24 season. On 4 July, the club announced that Tilio's loan would be extended for the following campaign.

=== Rapid Wien ===
Having made just two appearances for Celtic, Austrian club Rapid Wien announced the signing of Tilio on a four-year contract on 25 August 2025. He was assigned the number 7 shirt.

== International career ==
Tilio began his international career with the Young Socceroos in 2019, where he was called up to the Australia squad for the 2019 AFF U-18 Youth Championship. At age 17, Tilio played his first international game against the Vietnam U-20s in the 2019 AFF U-18 Youth Championship group stage where he scored a hat trick in the 1st, 34th and 90th minute.

On 22 July 2021, Tilio scored his first goal for the Olyroos in a 2–0 win against Argentina with his second touch after coming on as a substitute in the 80th minute.

On 20 November 2022, Tilio was named in Australia's squad for the 2022 FIFA World Cup after Martin Boyle was ruled out of the tournament due to injury.

== Career statistics ==
=== Club ===
As of 27 October 2026

Appearances and goals by club, season and competition
| Club | Season | League | | | National cup | | Continental | | Other | | Total | |
| Club | Season | Division | Apps | Goals | Apps | Goals | Apps | Goals | Apps | Goals | Apps | Goals |
|---|---|---|---|---|---|---|---|---|---|---|---|---|
| Sydney FC NPL | 2019 | National Premier Leagues NSW | 16 | 5 | — | | — | | — | | 16 | 5 |
| Sydney FC | 2018–19 | A-League | 0 | 0 | 0 | 0 | 1 | 0 | — | | 1 | 0 |
| Sydney FC | 2019–20 | A-League | 3 | 1 | 0 | 0 | 2 | 0 | 0 | 0 | 5 | 1 |
| Sydney FC | Total | | 3 | 1 | 0 | 0 | 3 | 0 | 0 | 0 | 6 | 1 |
| Melbourne City | 2020–21 | A-League | 22 | 2 | — | | — | | — | | 22 | 2 |
| Melbourne City | 2021–22 | A-League Men | 25 | 5 | 3 | 0 | 5 | 3 | — | | 33 | 8 |
| Melbourne City | 2022–23 | A-League Men | 29 | 10 | 2 | 0 | — | | — | | 31 | 10 |
| Melbourne City | Total | | 76 | 17 | 5 | 0 | 5 | 3 | — | | 86 | 20 |
| Melbourne City NPL | 2021 | Victoria Premier League 2 | 2 | 1 | — | | — | | — | | 2 | 1 |
| Celtic | 2023–24 | Scottish Premiership | 2 | 0 | 0 | 0 | 0 | 0 | 0 | 0 | 2 | 0 |
| Melbourne City (loan) | 2023–24 | A-League Men | 4 | 1 | — | | — | | — | | 4 | 1 |
| Melbourne City (loan) | 2024–25 | A-League Men | 19 | 5 | 1 | 0 | — | | — | | 20 | 5 |
| Melbourne City (loan) | Total | | 23 | 6 | 1 | 0 | — | | — | | 24 | 6 |
| Rapid Wien | 2025–26 | Austrian Bundesliga | 11 | 1 | 2 | 0 | 1 (Note: Appearance in UEFA Conference League) | 0 | — | | 14 | 1 |
| Rapid Wien | 2026–27 | Austrian Bundesliga | 10 | 2 | 3 | 0 | 5 | 1 | — | | 18 | 3 |
| Rapid Wien | Total | | 21 | 3 | 5 | 0 | 6 | 1 | — | | 32 | 4 |
| Career total | | | 143 | 33 | 11 | 0 | 14 | 4 | 0 | 0 | 168 | 37 |

=== International ===
As of match played 10 June 2025

Appearances and goals by national team and year
| National team | Year | Apps | Goals |
|---|---|---|---|
| Australia | 2022 | 5 | 0 |
| Australia | 2023 | 2 | 0 |
| Australia | 2024 | 2 | 0 |
| Australia | 2025 | 1 | 0 |
| Total | | 10 | 0 |

== Honours ==
Melbourne City

- A-League Premiership: 2020–21, 2021–22, 2022–23
- A-League Championship: 2020–21, 2024–25

Sydney FC

- A-League Premiership: 2019–20
- Y-League: 2019–20

Celtic

- Scottish Premiership: 2023–24

Australia U20

- AFF U-19 Youth Championship: 2019

Individual

- A-Leagues All Star: 2022
- PFA A-League Team of the Season: 2022–23
