= 2008 AFF U-19 Youth Championship =

AFF U-19 Youth Championship Thailand 2008

Tournament details
- Host country: Thailand
- City: Bangkok
- Dates: 5–11 October
- Teams: 4 (from 2 confederations)
- Venue: 1 (in 1 host city)

Final positions
- Champions: Australia (2nd title)
- Runners-up: South Korea
- Third place: China
- Fourth place: Thailand

Tournament statistics
- Matches played: 8
- Goals scored: 15 (1.88 per match)
- Top scorer(s): (Thailand) Nirunrit Jaroensuk (3 goals)

The 2008 AFF U-19 Youth Championship took place from 5 to 11 October 2008 in Bangkok, Thailand. This is the first edition of tournament as an under-19 competition as it was previously for players under-20. Only four nations participated, two from the ASEAN region and two invitee teams.

== Teams ==
- Australia
- China
- South Korea
- Thailand

== Venues ==
Bangkok
Rajamangala Stadium
Capacity: 49,722
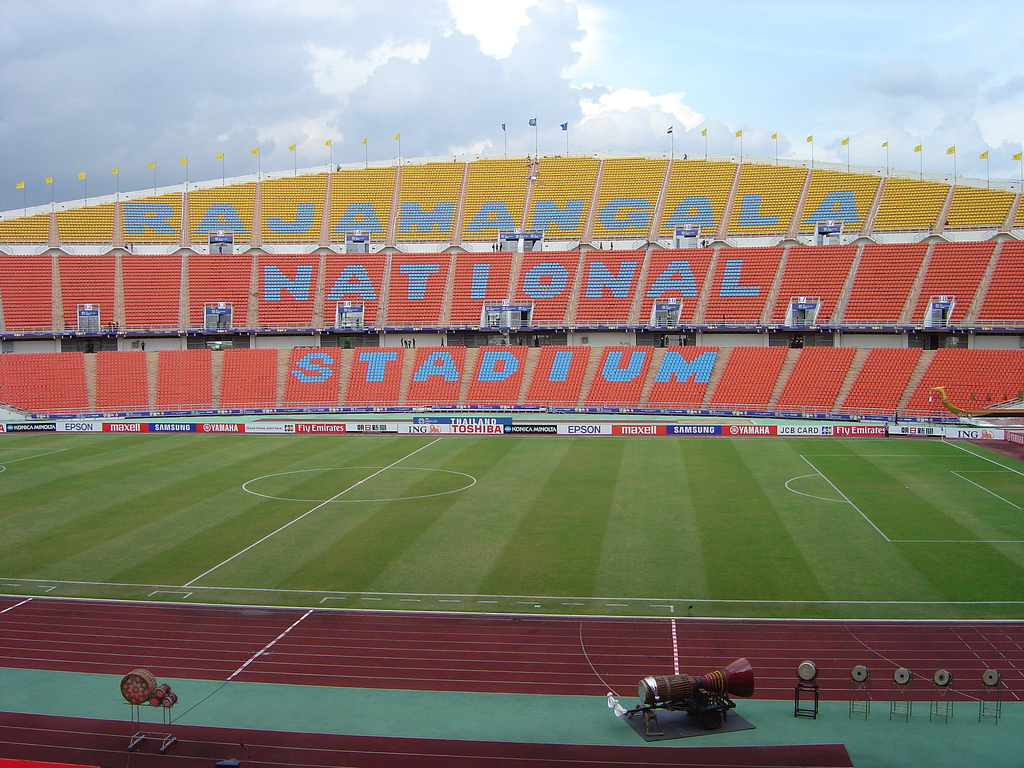

== Tournament ==
All times are Thailand Standard Time (TST) – UTC+7

=== Group stage ===
Team	Pld	W	D	L	GF	GA	GD	Pts
Australia	3	2	1	0	5	2	+3	7
South Korea	3	2	1	0	2	0	+2	7
Thailand	3	1	0	2	4	3	+1	3
China	3	0	0	3	1	7	−6	0

5 October 2008
17:00

South Korea	1–0	Thailand
Choi Jung-Han 55'	Report

Rajamangala Stadium, Bangkok

5 October 2008
19:30

Australia	3–1	China
Lujić 6', 12'; Nichols 74'	Report	Piao Cheng 4'

Rajamangala Stadium, Bangkok

7 October 2008
17:00

South Korea	0–0	Australia
	Report

Rajamangala Stadium, Bangkok

7 October 2008
19:30

China	0–3	Thailand
	Report	Nirunrit 28', 74'; Kroekrit 58'

Rajamangala Stadium, Bangkok

9 October 2008
17:00

China	0–1	South Korea
	Report	An Jung-Hun 53'

Rajamangala Stadium, Bangkok

9 October 2008
19:30

Thailand	1–2	Australia
Nirunrit 76'	Report	Nichols 52'; Elasi 61'

Rajamangala Stadium, Bangkok

=== Third place play-off ===
11 October 2008
17:00

Thailand	0–3	China
	Report	Tan Yang 20', 52'; Yu Yang 42'

Rajamangala Stadium, Bangkok

=== Final ===
11 October 2008
19:30

Australia	0–0	South Korea
	Report
Penalties
Ryall (penalty scored); Naidovski (penalty scored); Holland (penalty scored)	3–1	(penalty missed) Lee Chang-Ho; (penalty missed) Park Jong-Woo; (penalty missed) Yang Jun-A; (penalty scored) Kim Jae-Min

Rajamangala Stadium, Bangkok

== Winner ==
2008 AFF U-19 Youth Championship

Australia
Second title

== Award ==
Fair Play Award
Thailand

== Goalscorers ==
3 goals:

- (Thailand) Nirunrit Jaroensuk

2 goals:

- (Australia) Miloš Lujič
- (Australia) Mitch Nichols
- (China) Tan Yang

1 goal:

- (Australia) Nathan Elasi
- (South Korea) Choi Jung-Han
- (South Korea) An Jung-Hun
- (China) Piao Cheng
- (China) Yu Yang
- (Thailand) Kroekrit Thaweekarn

== See also ==
- AFC U-19 Championship
