= Rhyan Grant =

Australian soccer player (born 1991)

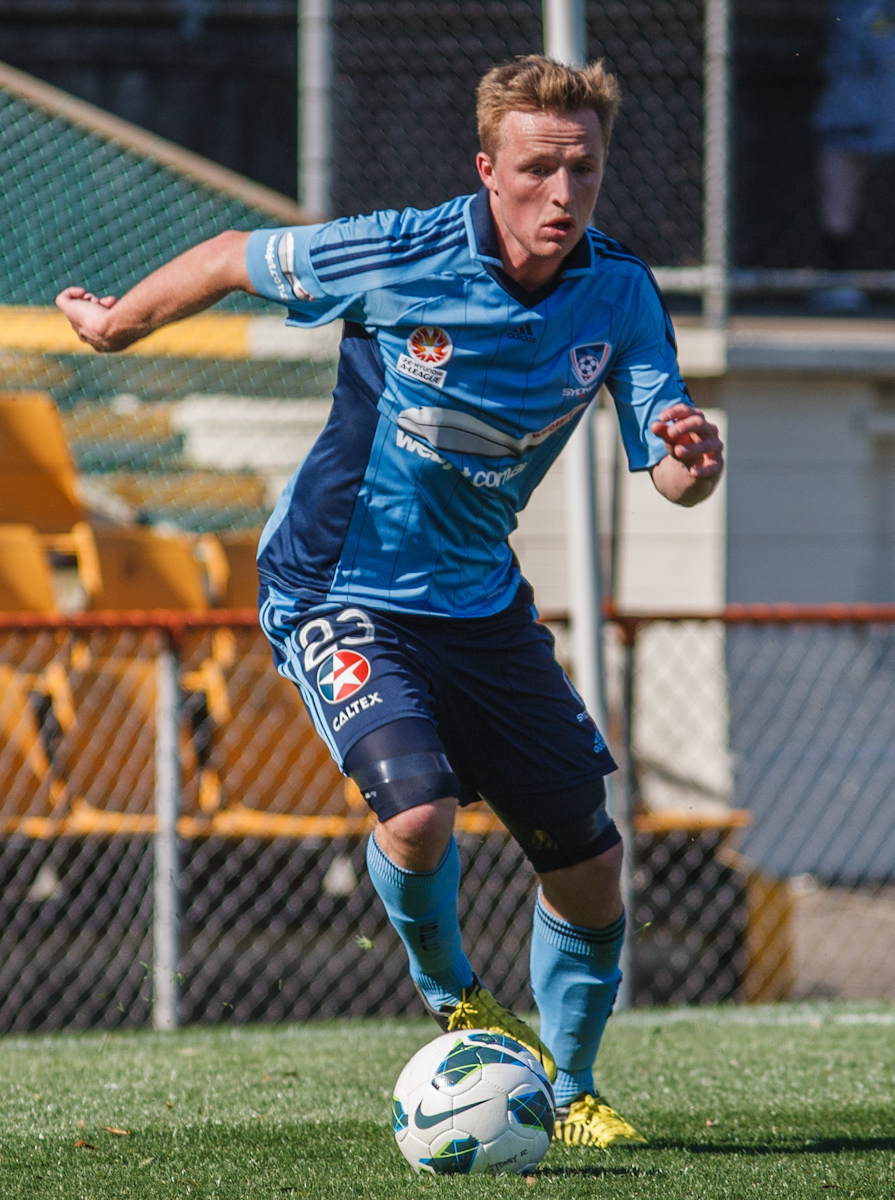
- Grant playing for Sydney FC in 2012

Personal information
- Full name: Rhyan Bert Grant
- Date of birth: 26 February 1991 (age 35)
- Place of birth: Canowindra, New South Wales, Australia
- Height: 1.76 m (5 ft 9 in)
- Position: Right-back

Team information
- Current team: Sydney FC
- Number: 23

Youth career
- Canowindra Juniors
- Bathurst '75
- 2007–2008: NSWIS
- 2008: AIS
- 2008–2009: Sydney FC

Senior career*
Years	Team	Apps	(Gls)
2008–	Sydney FC	342	(17)

International career^{‡}
2009–2011	Australia U20	23	(0)
2011–2012	Australia U23	3	(1)
2018–	Australia	21	(1)
Medal record
Representing Australia
Men's Association football
AFC U-20 Asian Cup
Runner-up	2010 China
- * Club domestic league appearances and goals as of 26 April 2026 ‡ National team caps and goals as of 2 February 2022

Rhyan Bert Grant (born 26 February 1991) is an Australian professional soccer player who plays as a right-back for A-League Men club Sydney FC, whom he also captains.

Born in Canowindra, New South Wales, Grant played youth soccer at the Australian Institute of Sport before making his professional debut for Sydney FC in 2008. Grant started his career playing in the midfield before becoming an attacking right back known for his supporting play down the wing. He is one of the few players in the A-League to have only played for the one club, is Sydney FC's longest serving player and is in an exclusive club of few to have 400 appearances in all competitions.

== Club career ==
=== Youth career ===
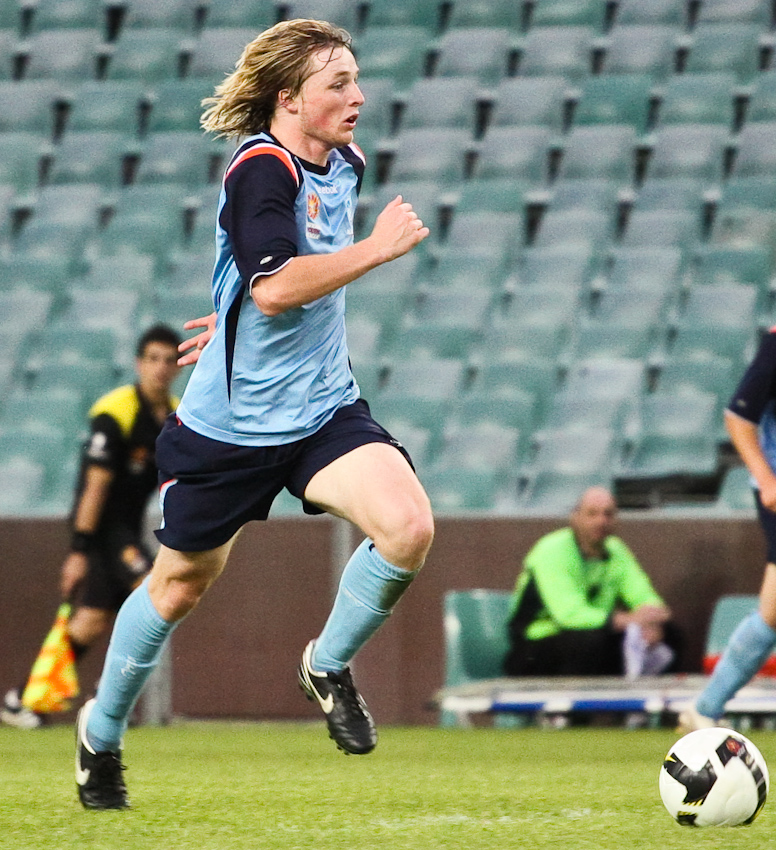
Rhyan Grant playing for the Sydney FC Youth team, November 2008.

In June 2008, Grant received an invitation to take up a scholarship at the AIS in Canberra where he was selected despite not fitting into the age criteria for the 2008 scholarship program. After impressing during his three months in the nation's capital, he was signed as a member of Sydney FC's inaugural National Youth League squad in September 2008.

This team finished as champions for the 2008–09 season. He made 15 appearances for the National Youth League team during the season, scoring one goal. After Sydney FC Youth had clinched the National Youth League minor premiership by winning 13 and drawing two of their 18 regular season games, they progressed to the Grand Final where they met Adelaide United at Hindmarsh Stadium in Adelaide on 21 February 2009. Grant played the full 90 minutes as Sydney FC triumphed 2–0.

=== Sydney FC ===
==== 2008–09 to 2009–10 ====
During the National Youth League season, Grant also managed to earn a call-up to the senior team. On 21 December 2008, Grant made his senior debut for Sydney FC against Perth Glory at the Sydney Football Stadium, appearing as a 78th-minute substitute for Antony Golec. The game was won 4–1 by Perth Glory. He was an unused substitute as Sydney FC lost 3–2 to Melbourne Victory at the Telstra Dome on 27 December 2008. Grant then appeared as a 71st-minute substitute for Shannon Cole as Sydney FC lost 2–0 to Adelaide United at the Adelaide Oval on 3 January 2009. On 11 January 2009, Rhyan Grant made his starting debut against Wellington Phoenix at the Sydney Football Stadium, and played the full 90 minutes as Sydney FC won 1–0.

He also played a full game in Sydney FC's 3–1 defeat by Queensland Roar at Suncorp Stadium on 17 January 2009, and provided the cross from which Kofi Danning scored in the 25th minute. Rhyan Grant also started Sydney FC's final game of the A-League season, a 4–0 win over the Newcastle Jets at the Sydney Football Stadium on 25 January 2009. He was replaced in the 86th minute by Terry McFlynn.

Grant finished the 2008–09 A-League season with five senior appearances. He wore shirt number 34 in these five matches. He was then given shirt number 23 for the 2009–10 A-League season as he earned a full senior contract.

After a successful start to his senior career, Grant looked to cement a permanent first team spot in the 2009–10 season after impressing early in Sydney's undefeated run of pre-season trials. He ended up playing 9 games, starting 3, and winning his first Premiership.

He signed a new two-year contract with Sydney FC on 27 August 2010.

==== 2010–11 to 2013–14 ====
Grant scored his first senior goal for Sydney FC against the Central Coast Mariners in a 1–1 draw during the 2010–11 A-League season.

At the end of the 2012–13 season, Grant was selected to play for the A-League All Star team against Manchester United in Sydney on 20 July 2013. Grant was substituted onto the field for Michael McGlinchey in the match.

Grant's 2013–14 campaign ended prematurely in Round 3 at home to the Western Sydney Wanderers. Grant was contesting a tackle, when his foot was caught in the pitch causing him to rupture his anterior cruciate ligament. The injury required surgery and kept him out for the rest of the season.

==== 2014–15 to 2015–16 ====
The following year, Grant's long-awaited return from injury came on 22 November 2014 when he was selected on the bench against the newly re-branded Melbourne City FC in Round 7. Grant was substituted onto the field for Ali Abbas in the 68th minute. For the rest of the season, Grant was consistently a part of the match-day squads, but mainly used of the bench, starting only a handful of games. The new Sydney FC coach, Graham Arnold, cited the reason for this was largely due to Grant missing a lot of tactical sessions during pre-season as he was returning from injury. Grant scored his first goal since coming back from injury in the Round 18 clash of the 2014–15 A-League season against Central Coast Mariners at Allianz Stadium with a 25-yard screamer in which Sydney FC would go on to win 4–2. Days later, Grant was rewarded for his form after returning from injury with a 2-year contract extension, along with teammate Sebastian Ryall. Prior to Grant's injury in 2013, he was mainly deployed as a utility player at the club but Arnold believed he would excel at right-back and had agreed with Grant to concentrate on these qualities in the 2015 off-season.

Grant began his transformation as specialized fullback during the 2015–16 A-League season, starting in all matches up until Round 26 as either a right or left back, missing only one game through suspension.

==== 2016–17 to 2017–18 ====
The 2016–17 season was another breakout season for Grant. He played every minute of every match in all competitions of the season, scoring 2 and assisting 5 while mainly playing in the right-back position. He would continue his success by scoring in the 69th minute of the grand final against Melbourne Victory to make it 1–1, where Sydney would eventually win 4–2 on penalties to lift the double. His form throughout the season earned him a call-up to Australian national soccer team 30-man train-on squad for the 2017 Confederations Cup. However, on 30 May 2017, it was announced that he did not make the final 23-man squad. Grant was also rewarded for his fantastic season by being selected for the 2016–17 PFA Team of the Season.

Grant suffered another anterior cruciate ligament injury in July 2017, keeping him out of the game for several months. The injury was sustained to his left knee this time, whereas the injury in 2013 was his right knee. Grant was able to return to training by the end of the season and had made himself available for selection for the final game of the regular season. However, ultimately Grant did not appear in either of Sydney FC's remaining two games of the season.

==== 2018–19 to 2020–21 ====
On Saturday, 10 November 2018 Grant went on to play his 150th appearance in the A-League against Newcastle Jets. One month later on 21 December 2018, he became the first player in Sydney FC history to reach ten years as player at the club. The occasion was marked two days later when he played against Perth Glory, the same team he played in his league debut ten years earlier. He became only the third player to achieve this in A-League history, after Leigh Broxham at Melbourne Victory and Andrew Durante at Wellington Phoenix. Grant's early season form was rewarded with a call-up to the national team for the 2019 AFC Asian Cup in January. This resulted in him missing seven games for the Sky Blues during a busy January period for the club before returning for the Round 17 match against Melbourne City. Grant started in all remaining league games and by season's end found himself again selected in the PFA A-League Team of the Season. A minor hamstring concern in the final round of the season against Newcastle Jets could not stop the 28-year-old from participating in the A-League final series, starting in the home semi-final against arch rivals, Melbourne Victory. With Sydney leading the game 5–0, Grant was substituted off in the 71st minute to save him for the Grand Final. The following weekend, Grant played in the 2019 A-League Grand Final against Perth Glory at Optus Stadium, Perth. Throughout the game, Grant had a growing duel with former Socceroo, Jason Davidson which eventually led to Grant receiving a yellow card in the 88th minute. Prior to and after this, the crowd of close to 60,000 had rung out a chorus of boos every time Grant had touched the ball. The effect of the constant taunting resulted in Grant putting his hand up to take a penalty in the shootout when the match ended nil-all after extra time. He was the third Sydney player to convert his penalty on the way to the club winning the shoot-out 4–1.

He scored the winning goal in the 2020 A-League Grand Final, off the chest from inside the six-yard box, in the 100th minute, winning his third Championship as well as his third Premiership as Sydney FC finished top of the table that season also. He won the Joe Marston Medal as man of the match.

==== 2021–22 to present ====
In the Round 22 fixture of the 2022–23 A-League Men season, Grant would become the first Sydney FC player to reach 300 games for the club in all competitions.

With the departure of Luke Brattan to Macarthur FC, Grant was announced as the new Captain of Sydney FC ahead of the 2024–25 A-League Men. On 28 November 2024, Grant made his 350th appearance for Sydney FC in a 4–1 win against Hong Kong side Eastern in the AFC Champions League Two. On 5 August 2025, he signed a one year contract extension, keeping him with the club until the end of the 2026–27 season.

On 17 March 2026, Grant made his 400th appearance in all competitions for Sydney FC in a 1–0 loss to Melbourne City. Grant played every minute of the 2025–26 A-League Men regular season.

== International career ==
He was selected for the training squad for Australia's 2009 FIFA U-20 World Cup team. Grant then went on to play in several competitions with the Young Socceroos in the Netherlands, one of which they won.

Grant was chosen as a train on player for Australia's friendly against South Korea in November 2018. For the match against Lebanon he was selected for the squad and made his debut, playing the full match. In December 2018, it was announced that Grant had made the final 23-man squad for the 2019 AFC Asian Cup. Grant replaced an injured Josh Risdon at half-time of the first game of the group stage against Jordan. He would go on to play the remaining fixtures for Australia, totaling 5 appearances for the campaign, whilst wearing the number 4 jersey previously worn by Socceroo great, Tim Cahill.

On 8 September 2021, Grant scored his first international goal as Socceroos beat Vietnam 1–0 away; he was earlier responsible for a potential handball on the penalty area before getting relief as no penalty was given.

== Personal life and philanthropy ==
Grant is an avid surfer. In 2018, whilst surfing off Collaroy Beach he was nearly killed in a freak accident when he was dumped in heavy swell, and was trapped beneath a sewage pipe. He suffered a broken arm and ribs as a result of the incident which saw him miss the first few weeks of the 2018–19 A-League season.

Grant is well known for his mullet hairstyle, which he grew whilst recovering from his second anterior cruciate ligament injury. During the 2019 Asian Cup it was revealed that Grant was required to seek special approval from the Asian Football Confederation regarding his mullet, as a result of the United Arab Emirates Football Association guidelines which prohibit 'unusual or offensive' haircuts or coloring.

In 2018 Grant took part in the Chappell Foundation's 'sleep out for youth homelessness' at the Sydney Cricket Ground, raising nearly $5,000 in the process.

In 2021 Grant raised over $25,000 when he participated in the 'World's Greatest Shave' for the Leukaemia Foundation in which he shaved off his famous hairstyle, following in the footsteps of fellow Sydney FC players Luke Brattan and Andrew Redmayne who had participated in the charity event the year previously.

== Career statistics ==
=== Club ===
As of 26 April 2026

Appearances and goals by club, season and competition
Club	Season	League (Note: A-League statistics include final series matches)			Cup (Note: Includes the FFA Cup / Australia Cup only)		Continental		Total	
Club	Season	Division	Apps	Goals	Apps	Goals	Apps	Goals	Apps	Goals
Australian Institute of Sport	2008	Victorian Premier League	13	1	0	0	–		13	1
Sydney FC	2008–09	A-League	5	0	–		–		5	0
Sydney FC	2009–10	A-League	9	0	–		–		9	0
Sydney FC	2010–11	A-League	11	1	–		5 (Note: Appearances in the AFC Champions League)	0	16	1
Sydney FC	2011–12	A-League	22	0	–		–		22	0
Sydney FC	2012–13	A-League	25	2	–		–		25	2
Sydney FC	2013–14	A-League	3	0	–		–		3	0
Sydney FC	2014–15	A-League	20	1	0	0	–		20	1
Sydney FC	2015–16	A-League	24	0	2	1	7	1	33	2
Sydney FC	2016–17	A-League	27	3	5	0	–		32	3
Sydney FC	2017–18	A-League	0	0	0	0	–		0	0
Sydney FC	2018–19	A-League	22	0	4	0	4	0	30	0
Sydney FC	2019–20	A-League	22	2	1	0	6	0	29	2
Sydney FC	2020–21	A-League	23	1	0	0	–		23	1
Sydney FC	2021–22	A-League Men	21	1	3	0	5	0	29	1
Sydney FC	2022–23	A-League Men	28	2	3	0	–		32	2
Sydney FC	2023–24	A-League Men	29	3	3	0	–		32	3
Sydney FC	2024–25	A-League Men	25	1	1	0	11 (Note: Appearances in the AFC Champions League Two)	1	37	2
Sydney FC	2025–26	A-League Men	26	0	3	0	–		29	0
Sydney FC	Total		342	17	25	1	38	2	406	20
Career total			355	18	25	1	38	2	419	21

=== International ===
As of 7 September 2021

Australia
Year	Apps	Goals
2018	2	0
2019	10	0
2021	2	1
Total	14	1

No.	Date	Venue	Opponent	Score	Result	Competition
1.	7 September 2021	Mỹ Đình National Stadium, Hanoi, Vietnam	Vietnam	1–0	1–0	2022 FIFA World Cup qualification

== Honours ==
=== Player ===
Sydney FC

- A-League Premiership: 2009–10, 2016–17, 2019–20
- A-League Championship: 2010, 2017, 2019, 2020
- FFA Cup/Australia Cup: 2017, 2023
- National Youth League Championship: 2008–09

Australia U-20

- AFC U-20 Asian Cup: runner-up 2010

=== Individual ===
- A-League All Star: 2013, 2022, 2024
- PFA A-League Team of the Season: 2016–17, 2018–19, 2019–20, 2020–21
- Joe Marston Medal: 2020
