= 2019–20 Y-League =

Y-League
- Season: 2019–20
- Champions: Sydney FC (4th title)
- Matches: 13
- Goals: 66 (5.08 per match)
- Top goalscorer: Marco Tilio (5 goals)
- Biggest home win: Brisbane Roar Youth 7–0 Melbourne Victory Youth
- Biggest away win: Western Sydney Wanderers Youth 0–5 Central Coast Mariners Academy
- Highest scoring: Melbourne City Youth 6–6 Perth Glory Youth
- Longest winning run: Melbourne Victory Youth (2 matches)
- Longest unbeaten run: Central Coast Mariners Academy (3 matches)
- Longest winless run: Perth Glory Youth (3 matches)
- Longest losing run: Canberra United Youth (3 matches)
- Highest attendance: 400; Adelaide United Youth 0–1 Melbourne Victory Youth (24 November 2019)
- Lowest attendance: 100; Western Sydney Wanderers 0–1 Canberra United Youth (23 November 2019)
- Total attendance: 2,065
- All statistics correct as of 1 December 2019.

The 2019–20 Y-League season (also known as the 2019–20 Foxtel Y-League season for sponsorship reasons) was the twelfth season of the Australian Y-League, the premier national competition for youth football in the country.

== Teams ==
Ten teams competed in the league – the same ten from the previous season – divided into two conferences. The competition ran from 16 November 2019 to 31 January 2020.

=== Conference A ===
Conference A contains teams from outside of New South Wales and the Australian Capital Territory.

Locations of the 2019–20 Y-League Conference A teams

Team	Location	Stadium	Capacity
Adelaide United Youth	Adelaide	Jack Smith Park	3,000
Brisbane Roar Youth	Brisbane	A.J. Kelly Park	1,500
Melbourne City Youth	Melbourne	CB Smith Reserve	2,000
Melbourne Victory Youth	Melbourne	Epping Stadium	10,000
Perth Glory Youth	Perth	Dorrien Gardens	4,000

=== Conference B ===
Conference B contains teams from New South Wales and the Australian Capital Territory.

Locations of the 2019–20 Y-League Conference B teams

Team	Location	Stadium	Capacity
Central Coast Mariners Academy	Gosford	Central Coast Mariners Centre of Excellence	3,000
Canberra United Youth	Canberra	Deakin Stadium	1,500
Newcastle Jets Youth	Newcastle	Newcastle No.2 Sportsground	5,000
Sydney FC Youth	Sydney	Lambert Park	7,000
Western Sydney Wanderers Youth	Sydney	Marconi Stadium	9,000

=== Managerial changes ===
Team	Outgoing manager	Manner of departure	Date of vacancy	Replaced by	Date of appointment	Table
Canberra United Youth	Dean Ugrinic			Ray Junna	23 July 2019	Pre-season

== Tables ==
Conference A
Pos	Team	Pld	W	D	L	GF	GA	GD	Pts	Qualification
1	Melbourne Victory Youth	8	5	1	2	17	16	+1	16	Qualification to the Grand Final
2	Brisbane Roar Youth	8	4	2	2	22	9	+13	14	
3	Adelaide United Youth	8	4	1	3	15	15	0	13	
4	Melbourne City Youth	8	2	4	2	15	16	−1	10	
5	Perth Glory Youth	8	0	2	6	11	24	−13	2	

Source: Y-League

Conference B
Pos	Team	Pld	W	D	L	GF	GA	GD	Pts	Qualification
1	Sydney FC Youth (C)	8	5	3	0	37	15	+22	18	Qualification to the Grand Final
2	Central Coast Mariners Academy	8	4	2	2	20	13	+7	14	
3	Newcastle Jets Youth	8	3	2	3	25	26	−1	11	
4	Western Sydney Wanderers Youth	8	3	2	3	10	17	−7	11	
5	Canberra United Youth	8	0	1	7	7	28	−21	1	

Source: Y-League
(C) Champions

== Results ==
Conference A
Home \ Away	ADE	BRI	MCY	MVC	PER
Adelaide United Youth		3–1	3–2	0–1	4–2
Brisbane Roar Youth	5–1		2–2	7–0	2–0
Melbourne City Youth	0–0	0–0		1–3	6–6
Melbourne Victory Youth	4–1	3–1	2–3		2–1
Perth Glory Youth	0–3	0–4	0–1	2–2	

Legend: Blue = home team win; Yellow = draw; Red = away team win.

Conference B
Home \ Away	CAN	CCM	NEW	SYD	WSW
Canberra United Youth		1–3	3–5	2–2	0–1
Central Coast Mariners Academy	2–0		2–2	3–3	1–0
Newcastle Jets Youth	6–1	2–1		3–5	0–0
Sydney FC Youth	7–0	5–3	8–3		6–0
Western Sydney Wanderers Youth	2–0	0–5	6–4	1–1	

Legend: Blue = home team win; Yellow = draw; Red = away team win.

=== Positions by round ===
Conference A
Team ╲ Round	1	2	3	4	5	6	7	8	9	10
Melbourne Victory Youth	5	3	1	3	2	2	1	2	3	1
Brisbane Roar Youth	1	1	2	1	1	1	2	1	1	2
Adelaide United Youth	2	2	3	2	3	3	3	3	3	3
Melbourne City Youth	3	4	4	4	4	4	4	4	4	4
Perth Glory Youth	4	5	5	5	5	5	5	5	5	5

Conference B
Team ╲ Round	1	2	3	4	5	6	7	8	9	10
Sydney FC Youth	1	1	2	2	1	1	1	1	1	1
Central Coast Mariners Academy	2	2	1	1	2	2	2	2	2	2
Newcastle Jets Youth	5	5	3	3	3	3	3	3	3	3
Western Sydney Wanderers Youth	3	3	4	4	4	4	4	4	4	4
Canberra United Youth	4	4	5	5	5	5	5	5	5	5

=== Grand Final ===
31 January 2020
16:30 AEST

Sydney FC Youth	5–1	Melbourne Victory Youth
Swibel 6'; Tilio 45+5', 73'; Hollman 56'; Koop 71'	Report	Lawrie-Lattanzio 37'

Jubilee Stadium, Sydney
Referee: Nathan Shakespear

== Season statistics ==
As of 26 January 2020

=== Scoring ===
==== Top scorers ====
Rank	Player	Club	Goals
1	(Australia) Marco Tilio	Sydney FC Youth	9
2	(Australia) Kosta Petratos	Newcastle Jets Youth	8
3	(Australia) Luis Lawrie-Lattanzio	Melbourne Victory Youth	8
3	(Australia) Jaiden Kucharski	Sydney FC Youth	8
5	(Australia) Ciaran Bramwell	Perth Glory Youth	6
5	(Australia) Alou Kuol	Central Coast Mariners Academy	6
5	(Australia) Mirza Muratovic	Brisbane Roar Youth	6

==== Hat-tricks ====
Player	For	Against	Result	Date	Ref.
(Australia) Mirza Muratovic	Brisbane Roar Youth	Melbourne Victory Youth	7–0 (H)	16 November 2019	
(Australia) Marco Tilio	Sydney FC Youth	Newcastle Jets Youth	8–3 (H)	16 November 2019	
(Australia) Ciaran Bramwell	Perth Glory Youth	Melbourne City Youth	6–6 (A)	23 November 2019	
(Australia) Jaiden Kucharski	Sydney FC Youth	Western Sydney Wanderers Youth	6–0 (H)	7 December 2019	
(Australia) Mirza Muratovic	Brisbane Roar Youth	Adelaide United Youth	5–1 (H)	14 December 2019	
(Australia) Luke Ivanovic	Sydney FC Youth	Central Coast Mariners Academy	5–3 (H)	29 December 2019	
(Australia) Kosta Petratos	Newcastle Jets Youth	Canberra United Youth	5–3 (A)	19 January 2020	
(Australia) Luis Lawrie-Lattanzio	Melbourne Victory Youth	Adelaide United Youth	4–1 (H)	25 January 2020	
(Sudan) Mohamed Adam	Western Sydney Wanderers Youth	Newcastle Jets Youth	6–4 (H)	25 January 2020	
(Australia) Benjamin Koop	Sydney FC Youth	Canberra United Youth	7–0 (H)	25 January 2020	

=== Clean sheets ===
Rank	Player	Club	Clean sheets
1	(Australia) Macklin Freke	Brisbane Roar Youth	2
2	(Australia) Tom Glover	Melbourne City Youth	1
2	(Australia) Dakota Ochsenham	Adelaide United Youth	1
2	(Australia) Adam Pearce	Central Coast Mariners Academy	1
2	(Australia) Nicholas Suman	Western Sydney Wanderers Youth	1
2	(Australia) Matthew Sutton	Melbourne Victory Youth	1

=== Discipline ===
==== Player ====
- Most yellow cards: 4
  - (Australia) Aaron Anderson
- Most red cards: 1
  - (North Macedonia) Matthew Bozinovski

==== Club ====
- Most yellow cards: 18
  - Melbourne City Youth
- Most red cards: 1
  - Melbourne Victory Youth

== See also ==
- 2019–20 A-League
- 2019–20 W-League
