= Sydney FC Youth =

- Full name: Sydney Football Club Youth
- Nickname: Sky Blues
- Founded: 2008
- Ground: Lambert Park (Y-League); Rockdale Ilinden Sports Centre (NPL)
- Chairman: Scott Barlow
- Youth Manager: Jim van Weeren
- League: National Premier Leagues NSW; A-League Youth
- 2026: 8th of 16
- Website: https://sydneyfc.com/npl-academy/academy-teams/
Home colours	Away colours	Third colours

Sydney Football Club Youth is the youth system of Sydney Football Club based in Moore Park, Sydney, Australia. The team competes in the National Premier Leagues NSW.

The youth setup also features under-20s and under-18s teams that both play in the National Premier Leagues NSW in their respective age groups.

== Youth team history ==
=== Early years (2008–2009) ===
The youth team was founded in 2008, as a Sydney FC representative team for the National Youth League (NYL) competition. The team consisted of twelve contracted youth positions with four overage players (from the senior squad) allowed to participate in games. The side had initially contracted Football Superstar winner, Adam Hett, but had to be replaced for the campaign due to a season ending knee injury. In its first season Sydney FC Youth won the 2008–09 NYL Championship, with former Socceroo & NSL stalwart, Steve O'Connor as the coach. Throughout the season the side dominated many games and finished the regular season on top of the ladder with 13 wins, 2 draws, 3 losses and 6 points clear of second-placed Adelaide United Youth. The pair then went straight to a Grand Final match, of which Sydney FC Youth emphatically took out the tournament with a 2–0 victory at Hindmarsh Stadium, Adelaide. The goalscorers were Ibrahim Haydar and Robbie Mileski. Many of the Sydney FC Youth players in the Grand Final went on to have success for the senior squad or found a home elsewhere. They included Vedran Janjetovic, Rhyan Grant, Matt Jurman, Antony Golec and Brendan Gan. Sydney FC Youth were unable to follow it up the following year, finishing fifth on the ladder and missing out on the finals series due to goal difference (behind Gold Coast United FC Youth, who went on to win the Championship).

=== Managers success (2009–2015) ===
After the second season, club legend Steve Corica replaced Steve O'Connor as head coach. The team had mixed success finishing fourth on the standings with 30 points behind Gold Coast United FC Youth on 41 points. The competition did not have a finals series for the first time. A few players from this cohort went on to play for the first team, including Dimitri Petratos, Nathan Sherlock, Joel Chianese and Blake Powell. To take up a more senior assistant role with the first team, Corica relinquished the head coach position for the 2011–12 season. He was replaced by Ian Crook. Again Sydney FC Youth were mid-table, finishing sixth. Crook himself went on to bigger things the following year, taking over head coach duties for the first team. Brian Dene came in as coach of the Youth team. The season became Sydney FC Youth's worst performance in the team's five-year history, finishing ninth. With the first team also struggling with performance and injuries, many of the Youth team played up in the first's team, which did not help the cause. Some of these players included Christopher Naumoff, Hagi Gligor, Peter Triantis and Aaron Calver. Steve Corica then returned as head coach for Sydney FC Youth with immediate success. The side won the Foxtel National Youth League Championship for the 2013–14 season. Unable to repeat this performance the following year, Corica again relinquished his duties as head coach to focus on his role within the senior squad.

=== Entry into National Premier Leagues (2014–present) ===
This followed a competition review by Football NSW that recommended the youth teams of Sydney FC join the National Premier Leagues. Along with a team playing first grade, an under-20 and under-18 team were created. The teams forms a level of the Sydney FC academy, unveiled in 2016. Rob Stanton took over the reins as head coach due to the heavily increased workload of the new competition. In the new National Youth League format with a shortened season, Sydney FC Youth started out of the block early recording three consecutive wins. Through the ten round campaign, the team lost only two games, both against Newcastle Jets Youth. The team sat two points clear of Newcastle to end the regular season in first place for Conference B. As Conference B winners, Sydney FC Youth played Adelaide United Youth for the premiership in a curtain raiser to A-League Round 16 match between Central Coast Mariners and Western Sydney Wanderers on 23 January 2016. Sydney FC Youth were convincing winners, taking out the premiership with a scoreline of 5–2.

Many influential faces returned for the debut of the team in the National Premier Leagues setup for Sydney U21. These included, Spyrakis, Timotheou, Araujo, Burgess, Lokolingoy and Antoniou. Notable exceptions included Anthony Bouzanis, Aaron Calver and George Blackwood as they had also signed senior contracts and were ineligible for the tournament. The team's debut match did not go according to plan, losing to Mounties FC 2–0 at home (Lambert Park). The side then went on a thrilling ten-game winning streak, that included some big wins (7–0 against Macarthur Rams and 7–4 against Bankstown Berries). The streak ended in somewhat unfortunate circumstances against Marconi Stallions as Sydney FC U21, after leading 1–0, allowed in two goals in last five minutes of the Round 12 clash to lose 2–1. The following game saw another defeat for the Sky Blues, suffering defeat in the "mini derby" against rivals Western Sydney Wanderers U21. A win, then a draw to Mounties FC in the Round 14 make-up game, then two more losses, meant Sydney FC U21 only picked up four points out of a possible 24, with title hopes looking shaky. However, Sydney FC U21 would get back on track with wins against Bankstown City Lions FC and St George FC. Sydney FC U21 remained undefeated in the final four rounds of the regular season to win the Premiers Plate, two points ahead of Western Sydney Wanderers U21. In fact, the final day was a very tense affair, as the two clubs were matched up against each other. The Wanderers, who were trailing by 3 points and −10 points differential needed a very large win to leap-frog the Sky Blues. However, the sides played out a 4–all draw at Popondetta Park and Sydney FC U21 were declared premiers.

== Under-23s squad ==
These players can also play with the senior squad and are all Young Professionals.

As of 13 February 2024

Note: Flags indicate national team as defined under FIFA eligibility rules; some limited exceptions apply. Players may hold more than one non-FIFA nationality.

No.	Pos.	Nation	Player
—	FW	AUS	Nathan Amanatidis
—	FW	AUS	Jacob Brazete
—	FW	AUS	Bailey Callaghan
—	DF	AUS	Joseph Calusic
—	DF	AUS	Zac De Jesus
—	FW	AUS	Marin France
—	MF	AUS	Oscar Fryer
—	FW	AUS	Mitchell Glasson
—	GK	AUS	Gus Hoefsloot
—	MF	AUS	Wataru Kamijo
—	MF	AUS	Will Kennedy

No.	Pos.	Nation	Player
—	FW	AUS	Joe Lacey
—	DF	AUS	Noah Matie
—	DF	AUS	Hayden Matthews
—	MF	AUS	Lachie Middleton
—	DF	AUS	Richard Nkomo
—	GK	AUS	Adam Pavlesic
—	FW	AUS	Tiago Quintal
—	MF	AUS	Dylan Rose
—	MF	AUS	Matthew Scarcella
—	DF	AUS	Tyler Williams
—	FW	AUS	Alen Harbas

== Stadium ==
The team's home grounds for NYL matches are Leichhardt Oval and Netstrata Jubilee Stadium. The team’s two home ground is Valentine Sports Park in the suburb of Glenwood and Rockdale Ilinden Sports Centre for NPL matches. The teams also shares Sydney FC's club's training base at Macquarie University in North Ryde. Also the team’s previous play out Lambert Park in the suburb of Leichhardt for NPL matches.

== Club officials ==
=== Current staff ===
As of 4 July 2019

Head coach	Assistant
Jim van Weeren	Howard Fondyke

=== First team coaches (NPL/NYL) ===
Name	Period	Seasons	Honours
Steve O'Connor	2008–2010	2 Y-League	2008–09 NYL Premiers and Champions
Steve Corica	2010–2011	1 Y-League	
Ian Crook	2011–2012	1 Y-League	
Brian Dene	2012–2013	1 Y-League	
Steve Corica	2013–2015	2 Y-League	2013–14 NYL Champions
Robert Stanton	2015–2018	3 Y-League, 2 NPL	2015–16 NYL Premiers and Champions; 2016 NPL NSW 2 Premiers and Champions; 2016–17 NYL Premiers
Giancarlo Italiano	2018–2019	1 Y-League	
Jim Van Weeren	2019–present	1 NPL	

== Seasons ==
As of 30 December 2020

Season	NYL / NPL NSW											International	Top scorer (Note: Top scorer only includes goals scored from league matches (National Youth League and NYL Finals or National Premier Leagues)		POTY	Rising
Season	Div	Pld	W	D	L	GF	GA	GD	Pts	Position	Finals	International	Player(s)	Goals	POTY	Rising
2008–09	NYL	18	13	2	3	43	22	+21	41	1st	W		Sean Rooney	9		
2009–10	NYL	24	11	6	7	43	33	+10	39	5th	–		Kerem Bulut	13		
2010–11	NYL	20	9	3	8	36	31	+5	30	4th	N/A		Kofi Danning	8		
2011–12	NYL	18	7	4	7	40	31	+9	25	6th	N/A		Mitchell Mallia	14	Hagi Gligor	
2012–13	NYL	18	6	3	9	41	46	-5	21	9th	N/A	3rd	Alec Urosevski	12	Peter Triantis	
2013–14	NYL	18	13	2	3	49	29	+20	41	1st	N/A	2nd	Mitchell Mallia	13	Chris Naumoff	
2014–15	NYL	18	8	4	6	40	27	+13	28	4th	N/A	5th	George Blackwood	6	George Blackwood	
2015–16	NYL	8	6	0	2	21	11	+10	18	1st	W		Max Burgess	4	Daniel Araujo	
2015–16	NPL2	26	16	3	7	84	41	+43	51	1st	W		Charles Lokolingoy	27	Daniel Araujo	
2016–17	NYL	8	5	1	2	23	15	+8	16	1st	RU		Charles Lokolingoy	6	Andrea Agamemnos	
2016–17	NPL1	22	6	2	14	34	52	-18	14 (Note: Deducted six points for misconduct)	11th	—		Charles Lokolingoy	7	Andrea Agamemnos	
2017–18	NYL	8	5	2	1	18	9	+9	17	2nd	—		Jeremy Cox	6	Jeremy Cox	Marco Tilio
2017–18	NPL1	22	4	4	14	27	47	-20	16	12th	—		Jeremy Cox	10	Jeremy Cox	Marco Tilio
2018–19	NYL	8	5	0	3	15	8	+7	15	2nd	—		Marco Tilio	4	Luke Ivanovic	Ryan Teague
2018–19	NPL1	22	6	3	13	33	52	-19	21	11th	—		Benjamin Koop	8	Luke Ivanovic	Ryan Teague
2019–20	NYL	8	5	3	0	37	15	+22	18	1st	W		Marco Tilio	9	Joel King	Adam Pavlesic
2019–20	NPL1	11	6	1	4	26	19	+7	19	5th	—		Patrick Wood	11	Joel King	Adam Pavlesic
2021	NPL1	17 (Note: The season was cancelled on 12 August 2021 with five games remaining in the regular season)	3	5	9	29	44	–15	14	12th	—		Adrian Segecic	4	Patrick Wood	Adrian Segecic
2022	NPL1	22	8	8	6	53	45	+8	32	7th	—		Jaiden Kucharski	18	Patrick Yazbek	Jake Girdwood-Reich

== Honours ==
=== Domestic ===
- NSW NPL 2/NSW League One Premiership
  - Premiers (1): 2016
- NSW NPL 2/NSW League One Championship
  - Champions (1): 2016
- Y-League/A-League Youth Premiership
  - Winners (4): 2008–09, 2013–14, 2015–16, 2016–17, 2019–20
  - Runners-up (2): 2017–18, 2018–19
- Y-League/A-League Youth Championship
  - Winners (2): 2008–09, 2015–16, 2019–20
  - Runners-up (1): 2016–17

=== International ===
- International U-21 Thanh Niên Newspaper Cup
  - Runners-Up (1): 2013
  - Third-place (1): 2012
- Free Trade Port trophy
  - Winners (1): 2018 (representing Team Australia along with Newcastle Jets)

=== Other ===
- NPL Fair Play Award (3): 2017, 2019, 2019

=== Individual ===
- NPL First team Player of the Year: Jaiden Kucharski (2022)

== See also ==
- Sydney FC
