= Robert Mileski =

Australian soccer player

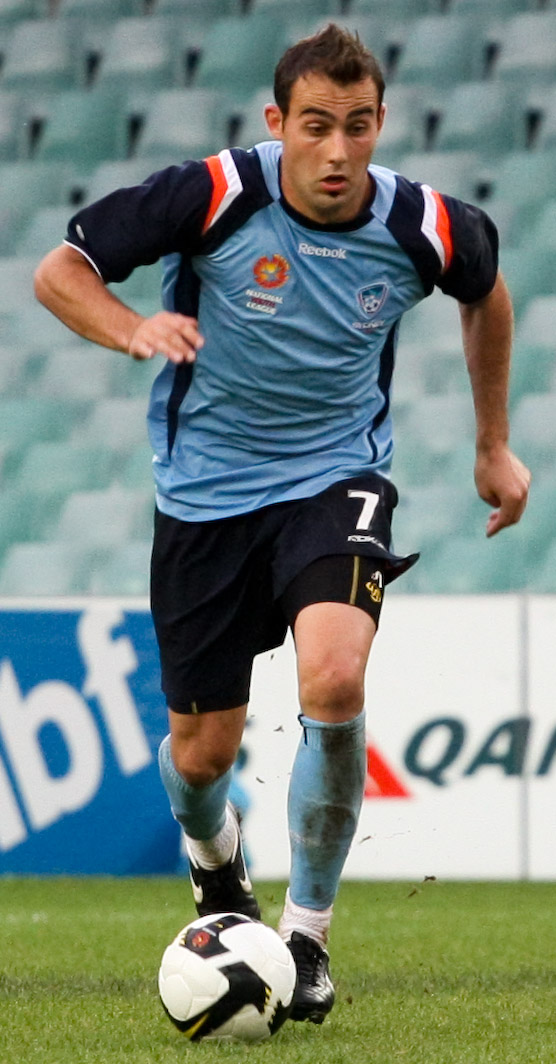
- Mileski playing for Sydney FC Youth in 2008

Personal information
- Date of birth: 16 May 1987 (age 39)
- Place of birth: Australia
- Height: 1.78 m (5 ft 10 in)
- Position: Striker

Youth career
- 2008–2009: Sydney FC

Senior career*
Years	Team	Apps	(Gls)
2001–2008	Bankstown City Lions		
2008–2009	Sydney FC	1	(0)
2009–2010	Bankstown City Lions		
2011–2012	Sydney Olympic		
2012	Bankstown City Lions		
2013–2016	Sydney United	76	(11)
2019	Gladesville Ryde Magic	0	(0)
- * Club domestic league appearances and goals as of 4 February 2021

Robert Mileski or Robbie Mileski (born 16 May 1987) is a former Australian soccer player. He previously played for NSW Premier League clubs Sydney Olympic FC and Sydney United 58 FC. He is currently the President of the Bankstown City Lions Football Club.

== History ==
In 2008, an approach was made by the Football Federation of Macedonia for the Sydney FC youth league player to join their national team set up.

== Honours ==
With Sydney FC:

- National Youth League Championship: 2008–2009

With Sydney Olympic FC:

- NSW Premier League Premiership: 2011

With Sydney United:

- Waratah Cup: 2016
