= Giovani Rosa =

Brazilian footballer (born 1992)

Giovani da Rosa
Personal information
- Full name: Giovani Darnei Martins da Rosa
- Date of birth: 7 January 1992 (age 34)
- Place of birth: Viamão, Rio Grande do Sul, Brazil
- Height: 1.88 m (6 ft 2 in)
- Position: Striker

Team information
- Current team: Central Sc

Youth career
- 2009–2010: Internacional
- 2011: Fluminense
- 2011–2012: Internacional

Senior career*
Years	Team	Apps	(Gls)
2012–2014	Internacional	0	(0)
2013	→ Novo Hamburgo (loan)	4	(1)
2014	→ América (RN) (loan)	0	(0)
2014	Vitória de Setúbal	7	(1)
2015	Aimoré	12	(3)
2015	Macaé	5	(0)
2016	Lajeadense	5	(0)
2016	Sergipe	7	(0)
2017	Passo Fundo	0	(0)
2018	Passo Fundo	13	(4)
2019	Central Sport Clube	9	(1)
2019	Luverdense Esporte Clube	5	(1)

International career
2009	Brazil U-17	0	(0)
- * Club domestic league appearances and goals as of 12 March 2017

Giovani Darnei Martins da Rosa (born 7 January 1992), known as Giovani da Rosa, is a Brazilian footballer who plays for Passo Fundo as a striker.

== Career ==
Born in Viamão, Rio Grande do Sul, Rosa's career started in the youth ranks of Internacional. In 2013, he joined the Campeonato Gaúcho team, Esporte Clube Novo Hamburgo, on a loan deal helping them advance to the quarterfinals of the 2013 season. In 2014, he moved to Copa do Nordeste side, América Futebol Clube (RN), but did not compete.

In July 2014, Giovani made his first move abroad joining the Primeira Liga club, Vitória de Setúbal. After six months, he returned to Brazil, again competing in Campeonato Gaúcho, in Clube Esportivo Aimoré. Afterwards he signed with Lajeadense in November 2015, Sergipe in March 2016 and Passo Fundo in December 2016.

== International career ==
Rosa was part of his nation under-17 side that competed in the 2009 FIFA U-17 World Cup.
