= 2008–09 National Youth League (Australia) =

National Youth League
- Season: 2008–09
- Champions: Sydney FC (1st title)
- Matches: 41
- Goals: 199 (4.85 per match)
- Top goalscorer: Francesco Monterosso (13 goals)
- Biggest home win: Adelaide United 5–0 Newcastle Jets (9 January 2009)
- Biggest away win: Newcastle Jets 1–7 Sydney FC (7 February 2009)
- Highest scoring: Perth Glory 3–5 Sydney FC (19 October 2008); Newcastle Jets 1–7 Sydney FC (7 February 2009)
- Longest winning run: 8 matches Sydney FC
- Longest unbeaten run: 8 matches Sydney FC
- Longest winless run: 9 matches Newcastle Jets
- Longest losing run: 9 matches Newcastle Jets

The 2008–09 National Youth League was the first season of the National Youth League, the top Australian youth soccer league.

== Teams ==
=== Stadiums and locations ===
Note: Table lists in alphabetical order.

Team	Location	Stadium	Capacity
Adelaide United U21s	Adelaide	Hindmarsh Stadium	16,500
Central Coast Mariners U21s	Gosford	Central Coast Stadium	20,059
Melbourne Victory U21s	Melbourne	Bob Jane Stadium	12,000
Newcastle Jets U21s	Newcastle	Energy Australia Stadium	33,000
Perth Glory U21s	Perth	Members Equity Stadium	20,500
Queensland Roar U21s	Brisbane	Suncorp Stadium	52,500
Sydney FC U21s	Sydney	Sydney Football Stadium	45,500

== League table ==
Pos	Team	Pld	W	D	L	GF	GA	GD	Pts	Qualification
1	Sydney FC U21s (C)	18	13	2	3	43	22	+21	41	Qualification to Grand Final
2	Adelaide United U21s	18	10	5	3	36	14	+22	35	Qualification to Grand Final
3	Brisbane Roar U21s	18	10	3	5	34	22	+12	33	
4	Perth Glory U21s	18	7	2	9	28	31	−3	23	
5	Central Coast Mariners U21s	18	6	2	10	20	36	−16	20	
6	Melbourne Victory U21s	18	6	1	11	21	26	−5	19	
7	Newcastle Jets U21s	18	3	1	14	17	48	−31	10	

Rules for classification: 1) points; 2) goal difference; 3) number of goals scored.
(C) Champions

== Results ==
Home \ Away	ADE	CCM	MVC	NEW	PER	QLD	SYD	ADE	CCM	MVC	NEW	PER	QLD	SYD
Adelaide United		3–0	3–1	0–0	0–0	1–1	0–1				5–0	3–0		3–3
Central Coast Mariners	1–6		2–1	0–4	0–1	1–0	1–3	0–2				2–2	0–3	0–1
Melbourne Victory	0–1	1–1		0–1	0–2	0–2	1–2	0–1	1–2				3–0	3–1
Newcastle Jets	0–3	2–4	0–1		2–5	0–3	3–2		1–2	0–2				1–7
Perth Glory	2–0	1–2	3–1	2–1		0–1	3–5			0–2	4–0			
Queensland Roar	0–1	2–1	3–1	3–0	5–1		1–1	3–3			3–2	3–2		
Sydney FC	2–1	2–1	2–3	2–0	3–0	2–1						1–0	3–0	

Updated to match(es) played on unknown. Source: ozfootball.net
Legend: Blue = home team win; Yellow = draw; Red = away team win.

== Grand Final ==
21 February 2009

Adelaide United	0–2	Sydney FC
	Report	Haydar 21'; Mileski 77'

Hindmarsh Stadium
Referee: Kris Griffiths-Jones

== Season statistics ==
=== Scoring ===
==== Top scorers ====
Rank	Player	Club	Goals
1	(Australia) Francesco Monterosso	Adelaide United U21s	13
2	(Australia) Chris Grossman	Queensland Roar U21s	11
3	(Australia) Nathan Elasi	Melbourne Victory U21s	10
4	(Australia) Sean Rooney	Sydney FC U21s	9
5	(Australia) Andrija Jukic	Perth Glory U21s	6
5	(Australia) Tim Smits	Queensland Roar U21s	6

==== Hat-tricks ====
Player	For	Against	Result	Date
(Australia) Sean Rooney	Sydney FC U21s	Perth Glory U21s	5–3 (A)	19 October 2008
(Australia) Andrija Jukic	Perth Glory U21s	Sydney FC U21s	3–5 (H)	19 October 2008
(Australia) Chris Grossman	Queensland Roar U21s	Perth Glory U21s	5–1 (H)	23 November 2008
(Australia) Nathan Elasi	Melbourne Victory U21s	Sydney FC U21s	3–1 (H)	28 December 2008

== Awards ==
- Player of the Year: Adam Sarota, Brisbane Roar
- Golden Boot: Francesco Monterosso, Adelaide United – 13 goals
