= Lee Chang-ho (footballer) =

South Korean footballer

Personal information
- Date of birth: 4 May 1989 (age 37)
- Place of birth: South Korea
- Height: 1.77 m (5 ft 9 1/2 in)
- Position: Midfielder

Team information
- Current team: Hwaseong FC

Youth career
- Soongsil University

Senior career*
Years	Team	Apps	(Gls)
2010–2012	Gyeongnam FC	0	(0)
2011–2012	→ Police (military service)		
2013	Suwon FC	22	(1)
2014	Hwaseong FC		

International career
- South Korea U-20
- * Club domestic league appearances and goals as of 20 December 2013

- Lee Chang-ho
- Hangul: 이창호
- RR: I Changho
- MR: I Ch'angho

Lee Chang-ho (Korean: 이창호; born 4 May 1989) is a South Korean footballer who plays as midfielder for Hwaseong FC in K League Challenge.

== Career ==
=== Club career ===
He was selected by Gyeongnam FC in 2010 K-League Draft.

== International career ==
He was called to the U-20 team to participate in 2008 AFC U-19 Championship.
