= Nathan Elasi =

Australian footballer

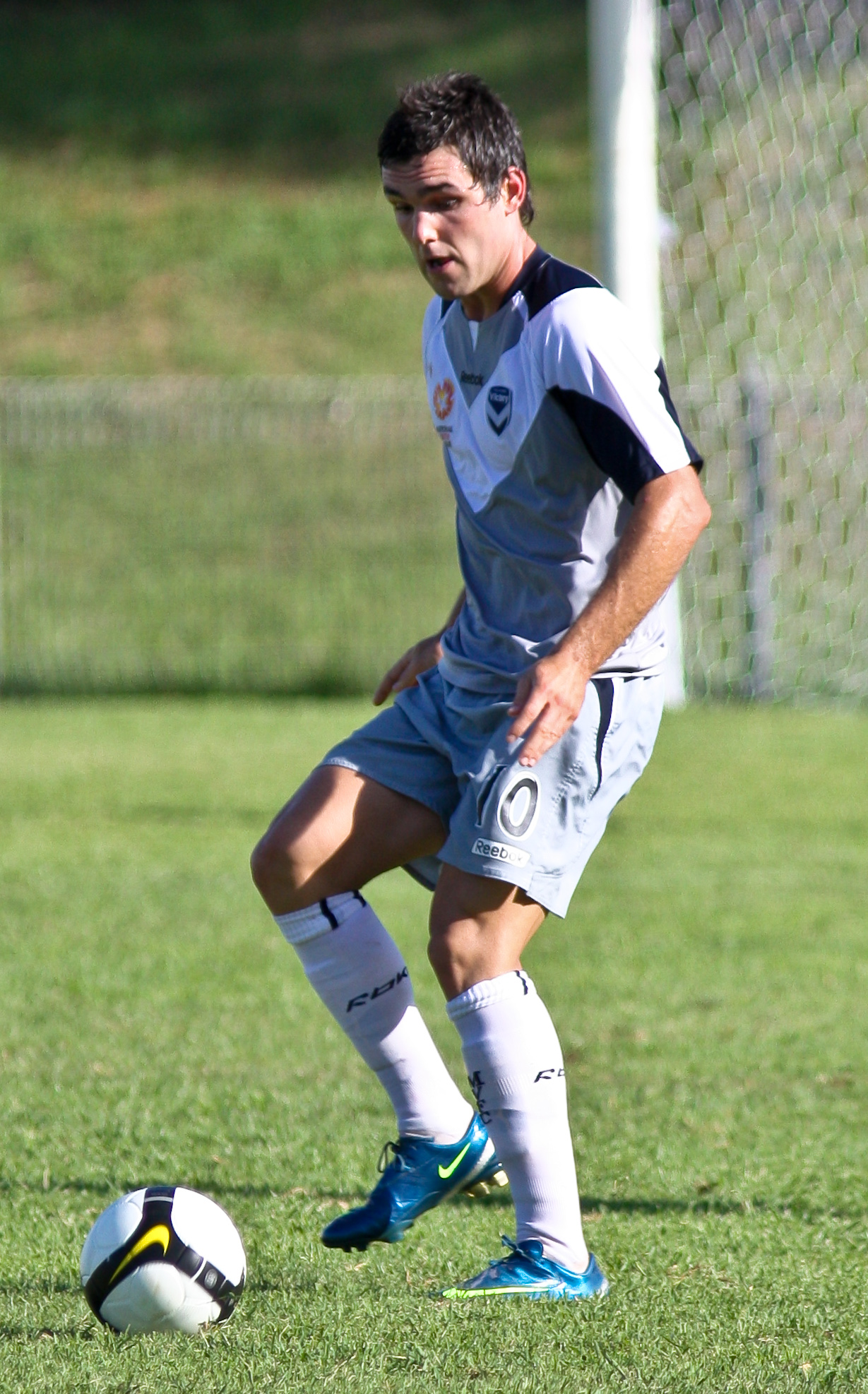

Personal information
- Full name: Nathan Michael Elasi
- Date of birth: 18 November 1989 (age 36)
- Place of birth: Sydney, Australia
- Height: 1.80 m (5 ft 11 in)
- Position: Striker

Youth career
- Sutherland Sharks
- Sydney Olympic
- 2006–2007: Marconi Stallions

Senior career*
Years	Team	Apps	(Gls)
2008–2010	Melbourne Victory	7	(0)
2010–2011	Bonnyrigg White Eagles	42	(8)
2012	Marconi Stallions	26	(10)
2013–2014	Sutherland Sharks	49	(13)
2015–2016	APIA Leichhardt	39	(7)
2017	Sutherland Sharks	19	(6)
2018	Wollongong United	22	(15)

International career^{‡}
2007–2009	Australia U-20	20	(4)
- * Club domestic league appearances and goals as of 23 November 2018 ‡ National team caps and goals as of 21 January 2008

Nathan Michael Elasi (born 18 November 1989) is an Australian former professional soccer player who played as a forward. He played professionally for Melbourne Victory in the A-League and at National Premier Leagues NSW Men's level in New South Wales. Elasi also represented Australia at under-20 level.

== Club career ==
Elasi was named Golden Boot winner in the Football NSW Grade 20 league with Marconi Stallions in their 2006–2007 season.

=== Melbourne Victory ===
He was signed by Melbourne Victory in January 2008, as a recruit for Victory's 2008 AFC Champions League campaign, primarily as a back-up for first choice strikers, Archie Thompson and Danny Allsopp. Originally recommended to Ernie Merrick by fellow Young Socceroos player Sebastian Ryall, Elasi had since impressed in club training with his pace, positioning and his ability to use his body.

=== Bonnyrigg White Eagles ===
He had a trial with new club Melbourne Heart but turned down their contract offer due to them being a rival of his old club Victory. Afterwards, Elasi joined the NSW Premier League team in April 2010 setting up the final goal in Bonnyrigg's 4–0 victory over the Bankstown City Lions on debut.

=== APIA Leichhardt Tigers ===
Elasi signed for NSW NPL1 club APIA Leichhardt Tigers for their 2015 campaign.

== Honours ==
Australia

- International Cor Groenewegen Tournament (U-20): 2009
- AFF U19 Youth Championship: 2008

Melbourne Victory FC

- A-League Championship: 2008–09
- A-League Premiership: 2008–09
