= A-League Youth =

- Organising body: Football Australia (2008–2020); Australian Professional Leagues (2020–2021)
- Founded: 2008
- Country: Australia
- Confederation: AFC
- Conferences: 2
- Number of clubs: 10
- Current champions: Sydney FC Youth (2019–20)
- Most championships: Sydney FC Youth (3)

A-League Youth, formerly known as the National Youth League and Y-League is a defunct Australian national soccer youth developmental and under-21s league, founded by Football Federation Australia and later run by the Australian Professional Leagues. The current league was established as a successor to the previous competition of the National Youth League (1984–2004) and commenced in August 2008. The league runs in conjunction with the A-League Men as a developmental or reserve league. The league, as well as the A-League Men and A-League Women are administered by the Australian Professional Leagues.

In 2020 it was contested by ten teams, all of which competed in the A-League. From the 2020–21 season, the league was to expand to eleven teams with the introduction of Western United, however the season was cancelled as a result of the COVID-19 pandemic in Australia.

Following the end of COVID restrictions the league did not return, and the clubs now focus on their development through their entries in the National Premier Leagues system in each state. The new system benefits the clubs by removing the expensive interstate travel, and exposes the players to a tougher level of competition over a longer period with more matches.

== History ==

=== Foundation ===
A previous league under the same name, the National Youth League was an Australian national soccer league run in parallel to the National Soccer League (NSL) between 1984 and 2004.

The current league was announced by Football Federation Australia at the start of March 2008. It was set up in conjunction with the A-League in order to continue to develop young Australian talent into the league as well as into the Australian national team and its affiliates such as the under 17, under 20 and under 23 teams. The league's inaugural season was made up of seven teams, each linked to the corresponding Australian club in the A-League (excluding Wellington Phoenix) and had strong links to players training at the Australian Institute of Sport (AIS). The 2009–10 season saw the addition of Gold Coast United and a team from the Australian Institute of Sport Football Program.

=== Expansion ===
In the 2012–13 season, Gold Coast United were replaced by Western Sydney Wanderers. In April 2017, the closing of the FFA Centre of Excellence (previously the Australian Institute of Sport Football Program) was announced. Before the 2017–18 season, it was announced that Canberra United were granted a National Youth League licence.

All players in the youth teams are between the ages of 16 and 21 as of the start of the calendar year for each new season, while four over-age players from each of the senior teams are also allowed to be selected.

The competition was renamed "A-League Youth" to align with other Australian national competitions in September 2021.

== Competition format ==
Each club contracts a squad of 16 Youth Development Players. Players must be between the ages of 16 and 23 as of 1 January in the year the season commences. Four over-age players (including goalkeeper) are also allowed to be selected (except when playing the AIS where it is restricted to two), usually these coming from the senior team. Each youth player must receive a minimum of 30 minutes game time. Players under 21 signed for the first team filling foreign player spots are classed as over-age players. These players can be any Australian player within the age group. A-League clubs must draw replacement players for their senior teams from the Youth League squad, except under certain circumstances. Such would include severe injuries to over-age players where an injury replacement player is able to be signed.

=== Original format ===
Up until and including the 2014–15 season the league had an 18-round format with every team playing all other teams Home and Away. In previous seasons an end-of-season finals series playoff tournament was played between the highest-placed teams from the regular season, culminating in the Grand Final game. The aim of a league is to provide a pathway for young players and state league players to play regular high-level football, and allow reserve players from senior A-League teams to remain match fit.

=== Introduction of conferences ===
From the 2015–16 season a new format was introduced. From 2016, all A-League clubs now have youth teams entered into their local conferences of the National Premier Leagues. By having NPL teams, there is now less reliance on the A-League Youth to provide an avenue for youth players to their respective clubs. There was also pressure from A-League clubs to reduce travel budgets. As such the season was shortened from 18 games per team to 8 games plus a Grand Final. The existing ten A-League Youth teams were divided into two conferences of five teams: Conference A consisted of teams from WA, SA, Victoria and Queensland, while teams from ACT and NSW were in Conference B. All teams play all other teams in their conference on a home and away basis. After the home and away series a Grand Final is played between the top teams from each conference.

== Clubs ==
12 clubs have played in the A-League Youth from its inception in 2008, up to and including the 2019–20 season.

The following 10 clubs competed in the Y-League during the 2019–20 season.

Current Clubs
Conference A
Team	Location	Stadium	Joined	Head coach
Adelaide United Youth	(South Australia) Adelaide, SA	Marden Sports Complex	2008–09	(Australia) Paul Pezos
Brisbane Roar Youth	(Queensland) Brisbane, QLD	Lanham Park	2008–09	(Australia) Warren Moon
Melbourne City Youth	(Victoria (state)) Melbourne, VIC	CB Smith Reserve	2011–12	(Italy) Alessandro Diamanti
Melbourne Victory Youth	(Victoria (state)) Melbourne, VIC	Epping Stadium	2008–09	(Australia) Gareth Naven
Perth Glory Youth	(Western Australia) Perth, WA	Dorrien Gardens	2008–09	(Australia) Richard Garcia
Conference B
Team	Location	Stadium	Joined	Head coach
Central Coast Mariners Academy	(New South Wales) Gosford, NSW	Central Coast Mariners Centre of Excellence	2008–09	(Scotland) Nick Montgomery
Canberra United Youth	(Australian Capital Territory) Canberra, ACT	Australian Institute of Sport	2017–18	(Australia) Ray Junna
Newcastle Jets Youth	(New South Wales) Newcastle, NSW	Newcastle No.2 Sportsground	2008–09	(Australia) Daniel McBreen
Sydney FC Youth	(New South Wales) Sydney, NSW	Leichhardt Oval / Netstrata Jubilee Stadium	2008–09	(Australia) Jim Van Weeren
Western Sydney Wanderers Youth	(New South Wales) Sydney, NSW	Marconi Stadium / Popondetta Park	2012–13	(Australia) Arthur Diles

Defunct Clubs
Team	Location	Stadium	Joined	Dissolved
Gold Coast United Youth	(Queensland) Gold Coast, QLD	Owen Park	2008–09	2011
FFA Centre of Excellence	(Australian Capital Territory) Canberra, ACT	Australian Institute of Sport	2009–10	2017

== Honours ==
=== Champions ===
Season	Champion
2008–09	Sydney FC Youth
2009–10	Gold Coast United Youth
2015–16	Sydney FC Youth
2016–17	Melbourne City Youth
2017–18	Western Sydney Wanderers Youth
2018–19	Brisbane Roar Youth
2019–20	Sydney FC Youth
2020–21	Tournament cancelled due to COVID-19 pandemic
2021–22	Tournament cancelled due to COVID-19 pandemic
2022–23	No tournament
2023–24	No tournament
2024–25	No tournament
2025–26	No tournament
2026–27	No tournament

=== Wins by club ===
Club	Championships	Winning years
Sydney FC Youth	3	2008–09, 2015–16, 2019–20
Gold Coast United Youth	1	2009–10
Melbourne City Youth	1	2016–17
Brisbane Roar Youth	1	2018–19
Western Sydney Wanderers Youth	1	2017–18

== Sponsorship ==
From 2013 to 2020, the competition had Foxtel as its naming rights sponsor.

== See also ==
- Australian Junior Ice Hockey League
- Australian Youth Rugby Championships
- NRL Under-20s
