= 2026–27 Central Coast Mariners FC season =

Central Coast Mariners
2026–27 season
- Chairman: Ruben Gnanalingam
- Head Coach: John Hutchinson
- Stadium: Industree Group Stadium
- A-League Men: 11th
- Australia Cup: Round of 32
- Top goalscorer: League: Oliver Lavale (3 goals); All: Oliver Lavale (4 goals)
- Highest home attendance: 8,155 vs. Newcastle Jets (17 October 2026); A League Men
- Lowest home attendance: 4,921 vs. Perth Glory (21 November 2026); A League Men
- Average home league attendance: 6,538
- Biggest defeat: 0–3 vs. Sydney FC (A) (6 November 2026); A-League Men
Home colours	Away colours	Third colours
- All statistics correct as of 6 November 2026.

The 2026–27 season is Central Coast Mariners Football Club's 22nd season in the A-League Men. In addition to the domestic league, Central Coast Mariners also participated in this season's editions of the Australia Cup.

== Players ==
Note: Flags indicate national team as defined under FIFA eligibility rules; some limited exceptions apply. Players may hold more than one non-FIFA nationality.

No.	Pos.	Nation	Player
3	DF	AUS	Diesel Herrington
4	DF	AUS	Trent Sainsbury (captain)
5	DF	AUS	Lucas Mauragis
6	MF	AUS	Haine Eames
8	MF	AUS	Chris Donnell
9	FW	AUS	Oliver Lavale
11	FW	ENG	John-Kymani Gordon
12	DF	SCO	Noah McCann
15	DF	NZL	Storm Roux
16	MF	AUS	Harry Steele
17	FW	AUS	Presley Ortiz
20	GK	NGR	Rufai Abubakar
21	DF	JAM	Daniel Scarlett
22	FW	AUS	Arthur De Lima (scholarship)
23	MF	JPN	Taiyo Hisamatsu
29	MF	AUS	Kristian Popovic

No.	Pos.	Nation	Player
30	GK	AUS	Andrew Redmayne
37	FW	AUS	Bailey Brandtman (scholarship)
39	MF	AUS	Alex Bolton (scholarship)
40	GK	AUS	Dylan Peraić-Cullen
41	DF	AUS	Shumba Mutokoyi (scholarship)
42	FW	AUS	Max Naylor
43	FW	AUS	Luke Becvinovski
44	MF	AUS	Oliver O'Carroll (scholarship)
45	MF	AUS	Jesse Mantell (scholarship)
46	DF	AUS	Callum McCaskey (scholarship)
47	DF	AUS	Stevan Rujak (scholarship)
48	FW	AUS	Noah Hooper (scholarship)
50	GK	AUS	Jai Ajanovic (scholarship)
72	FW	IRQ	Ali Auglah
—	DF	AUS	Gabriel Tilo (scholarship)
—	GK	NZL	Will Martin (scholarship)

== Transfers and contracts ==
=== Transfers in ===
No.	Position	Player	Transferred from	Type/fee	Contract length	Date	Ref
44	MF	Oliver O'Carroll	Melbourne City Youth	Scholarship		1 July 2026	
12	DF	(Scotland) Noah McCann	Unattached	Free transfer		2 July 2026	
42	FW	Max Naylor	(Australia) Fremantle City	Free transfer		7 July 2026	
29	MF	Kristian Popovic	Unattached	Free transfer		10 July 2026	
43	FW	Luke Becvinovski	Melbourne City Youth	Free transfer		17 July 2026	
39	MF	Alex Bolton	(Sweden) AIK	Scholarship		20 July 2026	
48	FW	Noah Hooper	Western Sydney Wanderers Youth	Scholarship		24 July 2026	
47	DF	Stevan Rujak	Western Sydney Wanderers Youth	Scholarship		14 August 2026	
17	FW	Presley Ortiz	(Australia) APIA Leichhardt	Free transfer		16 September 2026	
	DF	Gabriel Tilo	(Australia) Sydney United 58	Scholarship		17 September 2026	
21	DF	(Jamaica) Daniel Scarlett	(Jamaica) Chapelton Maroons	Free transfer		17 September 2026	
20	GK	(Nigeria) Rufai Abubakar	(Nigeria) Mavlon	Free transfer		17 September 2026	
14	FW	Nicholas Duarte	(Australia) Heidelberg United	End of loan	(1 year)	18 September 2026	
11	FW	(England) John-Kymani Gordon	Unattached	Free transfer		6 October 2026	
23	MF	(Japan) Taiyo Hisamatsu	Unattached	Free transfer		13 October 2026	
	GK	(New Zealand) Will Martin	(Australia) Lions FC	Scholarship		21 October 2026	

==== From academy squad ====
N	Pos.	Nat.	Name	Age	Notes
41	DF	(Australia)	Shumba Mutokoyi	17	Scholarship contract
45	MF	(Australia)	Jesse Mantell	18	Scholarship contract
46	DF	(Australia)	Callum McCaskey	17	Scholarship contract

=== Transfers out ===
No.	Position	Player	Transferred to	Type/fee	Date	Ref
7	FW	Christian Theoharous	(Australia) Heidelberg United	End of contract	26 June 2026	
21	MF	(New Zealand) Seth Clark	(Australia) Sydney Olympic	End of contract	27 June 2026	
2	DF	James Donachie	Unattached	End of contract	30 June 2026	
3	DF	Nathan Paull	Macarthur FC	End of contract	30 June 2026	
8	MF	(Northern Ireland) Alfie McCalmont	Unattached	End of contract	30 June 2026	
10	FW	Miguel Di Pizio	Western Sydney Wanderers	End of contract	30 June 2026	
11	FW	Sabit Ngor	Brisbane Roar	End of contract	30 June 2026	
17	FW	(Japan) Kaito Taniguchi	(Japan) Mito HollyHock	End of contract	30 June 2026	
18	FW	Nathanael Blair	(Ukraine) Veres Rivne	End of contract	30 June 2026	
20	DF	Will Kennedy	Unattached	End of contract	30 June 2026	
26	DF	Brad Tapp	(Malaysia) Johor Darul Ta'zim	End of contract	30 June 2026	
37	FW	Logan Sambrook	Unattached	End of contract	30 June 2026	
14	FW	Nicholas Duarte	(Australia) Wollongong Wolves	Loan	18 September 2026	

=== Contract extensions ===
No.	Player	Position	Duration	Date	Notes	Ref.
3	Diesel Herrington	Centre-back	2 years	25 June 2026		
15	(New Zealand) Storm Roux	Right-back	1 year	26 June 2026		
6	Haine Eames	Central midfielder	4 years	28 June 2026	New 4-year contract replacing previous contract.	
9	Oliver Lavale	Striker	1 year	30 June 2026		

== Pre-season and friendlies ==
9 September 2026 2026 PacificAus Sports Challenge	Vanuatu United	3–2	(Australia) Central Coast Mariners	Port Vila, Vanuatu
15:00 VST	Moses 1'; Kaltak 30' (pen.); Aru	Report	Becvinovski; Auglah	Stadium: Freshwater Stadium

12 September 2026 2026 PacificAus Sports Challenge	Vanuatu United	1–0	(Australia) Central Coast Mariners	Port Vila, Vanuatu
15:00 VST	Moses	Report		Stadium: Freshwater Stadium

19 September 2026	Central Coast Mariners (Australia)	5–1	(New Zealand) Wellington Phoenix	Sydney, Australia
		Report

26 September 2026	Western Sydney Wanderers (Australia)	5–1	(Australia) Central Coast Mariners	Sydney, Australia
15:00 AEST	Gersbach; Di Pizio; Thurgate; Hammond; Lual	Report	Auglah	Stadium: Wanderers Football Park; Attendance: TBA (members only)

3 October 2026	Sydney FC (Australia)	2–0	(Australia) Central Coast Mariners	Sydney, Australia
	Toure; G. Popovic	Report		Stadium: Sky Park

10 October 2026 Mariners Family Day	Central Coast Mariners (Australia)	2–4	(Australia) APIA Leichhardt	Gosford, Australia
11:00 AEST	Goal	Report	Segreto; Denmead; Konestabo; Rizzo	Stadium: polytec Stadium
Note: Match played over four 30-minute periods

== Competitions ==
=== Overall record ===
Competition	First match	Last match	Starting round	Final position	Record							
Competition	First match	Last match	Starting round	Final position	Pld	W	D	L	GF	GA	GD	Win %
A-League Men	17 October 2026		Matchday 1		5	0	3	2	4	9	−5	0.00
Australia Cup	22 July 2026	22 July 2026	Round of 32	Round of 32	1	0	1	0	1	1	+0	0.00
Total					6	0	4	2	5	10	−5	0.00

Last updated: 21 November 2026
Source: Soccerway

=== A-League Men ===
==== League table ====
Pos	Team	Pld	W	D	L	GF	GA	GD	Pts
8	Macarthur FC	4	1	2	1	4	4	0	5
9	Melbourne Victory	5	0	4	1	6	7	−1	4
10	Central Coast Mariners	5	0	3	2	4	9	−5	3
11	Newcastle Jets	4	0	2	2	4	8	−4	2
12	Adelaide United	4	0	1	3	5	12	−7	1

Updated to match(es) played on 21 November 2026. Source: A-Leagues
Rules for classification: 1) points; 2) goal difference; 3) goals scored; 4) wins; 5) head-to-head results; 5a) head-to-head points; 5b) head-to-head goal difference; 6) Fair Play points; 7) away goal difference; 8) away goals per match; 9) home goal difference; 10) home goals per match; 11) toss of a coin in an event of a tie of two clubs.

==== Results summary ====
Overall								Home						Away					
Pld	W	D	L	GF	GA	GD	Pts	W	D	L	GF	GA	GD	W	D	L	GF	GA	GD
5	0	3	2	4	9	−5	3	0	2	0	2	2	0	0	1	2	2	7	−5

Last updated: 21 November 2026.
Source: Ultimate A-League

==== Results by round ====
Round	1	2	3	4	5	6	7	8	9	10	11	12	13	14	15	16	17	18	19	20	21	22	23	24	25	26	27	28
Ground	H	A	A	A	H	H	B	H	A	A	H	H	A	A	H	A	A	B	H	A	H	H	H	A	H	A	A	H
Result	D	L	D	L	D		X											X										
Position	5	10	10	11																								
Points	1	1	2	2	3																							

Updated to match(es) played on 21 November 2026. Source: Ultimate A-League
A = Away; H = Home; W = Win; D = Draw; L = Loss; X = Bye

==== Matches ====
Win Draw Loss Fixtures

17 October 2026 1	Central Coast Mariners	2–2	Newcastle Jets	Gosford
19:40 AEDT	Auglah 11' (pen.); Lavale 60' (pen.)	Report	Wood 49'; Lavale 78' (o.g.)	Stadium: Polytec Stadium; Attendance: 8,155; Referee: Adam Kersey

25 October 2026 2	Wellington Phoenix	2–0	Central Coast Mariners	Wellington
15:00 NZDT	Durán 55'; Piper 57'	Report		Stadium: Hnry Stadium; Attendance: 5,301; Referee: Sam Kelly

1 November 2026 3	Melbourne Victory	1–1	Central Coast Mariners	Melbourne
15:00 AEST	Valadon 69'	Report	Lavale 63'	Stadium: AAMI Park; Attendance: 10,013; Referee: Jonathan Barreiro

6 November 2026 4	Sydney FC	4–1	Central Coast Mariners	Sydney
19:40 AEDT	Toure 31' (pen.), 42', 50'; G. Popovic 85'	Report	Lavale 90+1' (pen.)	Stadium: Allianz Stadium; Attendance: 9,022; Referee: Lachlan Keevers

21 November 2026 5	Central Coast Mariners	0–0	Perth Glory	Gosford
15:00 AEDT		Report		Stadium: Polytec Stadium; Attendance: 4,921; Referee: Shaun Evans

28 November 2026 6	Central Coast Mariners	v	Auckland FC	Gosford
19:40 AEDT		Report		Stadium: Polytec Stadium

12 December 2026 8	Central Coast Mariners	v	Brisbane Roar	Gosford
17:00 AEDT		Report		Stadium: Polytec Stadium

21 December 2026 9	Macarthur FC	v	Central Coast Mariners	Sydney
19:00 AEDT		Report		Stadium: Campbelltown Sports Stadium

27 December 2026 10	Adelaide United	v	Central Coast Mariners	Adelaide
19:30 ACDT		Source		Stadium: Coopers Stadium

31 December 2026 11	Central Coast Mariners	v	Melbourne City	Gosford
19:00 AEDT		Report		Stadium: Polytec Stadium

8 January 2027 12	Central Coast Mariners	v	Western Sydney Wanderers	Gosford
19:40 AEDT		Source		Stadium: polytec Stadium

16 January 2027 13	Perth Glory	v	Central Coast Mariners	Perth
18:45 AWST		Report		Stadium: HBF Park

23 January 2027 14	Newcastle Jets	v	Central Coast Mariners	Newcastle
19:40 AEDT		Report		Stadium: McDonald Jones Stadium

31 January 2027 15	Central Coast Mariners	v	Macarthur FC	Gosford
15:00 AEDT		Source		Stadium: Polytec Stadium

7 February 2027 16	Brisbane Roar	v	Central Coast Mariners	Brisbane
17:00 AEST		Report		Stadium: Kayo Stadium

13 February 2027 17	Melbourne City	v	Central Coast Mariners	Melbourne
19:40 AEDT		Report		Stadium: AAMI Park

7 March 2027 18	Auckland FC	v	Central Coast Mariners	Auckland
15:00 NZDT		Report		Stadium: Go Media Stadium

28 February 2027 19	Central Coast Mariners	v	Adelaide United	Gosford
15:00 AEDT		Source		Stadium: Polytec Stadium

7 March 2027 20	Auckland FC	v	Central Coast Mariners	Auckland
15:00 NZDT		Report		Stadium: Go Media Stadium

13 March 2027 21	Central Coast Mariners	v	Wellington Phoenix	Gosford
17:00 AEDT (19:00 NZDT)				Stadium: polytec Stadium

19 March 2027 22	Central Coast Mariners	v	Perth Glory	Gosford
19:40 AEDT		Report		Stadium: polytec Stadium

4 April 2027 23	Central Coast Mariners	v	Melbourne Victory	Gosford
15:00 AEST		Source		Stadium: Polytec Stadium

11 April 2027 24	Western Sydney Wanderers	v	Central Coast Mariners	Sydney
15:00 AEST		Source		Stadium: CommBank Stadium

17 April 2027 25	Central Coast Mariners	v	Sydney FC	Gosford
18:00 AEST		Source		Stadium: Polytec Stadium

25 April 2027 26	Newcastle Jets	v	Central Coast Mariners	Newcastle
16:00 AEST				Stadium: McDonald Jones Stadium

1 May 2027 27	Melbourne City	v	Central Coast Mariners	Melbourne
15:00 AEDT		Report		Stadium: AAMI Park

8 May 2027 28	Central Coast Mariners	v	Macarthur FC	Gosford
19:40 AEST		Source		Stadium: Polytec Stadium

=== Australia Cup ===
22 July 2026 Round of 32	Sydney United 58	1–1 (a.e.t.) (11–10 p)	Central Coast Mariners	Sydney
19:30 AEST	Krslovic 90' (pen.)	Source	Lavale 59'	Stadium: Sydney United Sports Centre; Attendance: 2,578; Referee: Sophie Allum
	Penalties
	De Oliveira (penalty scored); Cimenti (penalty scored); Krslovic (penalty scored); Tilo (penalty scored); Koko (penalty scored); Glassock (penalty scored); Rose (penalty scored); Vlastelica (penalty scored); Nakano (penalty scored); Ozanic (penalty scored); Pavlesic (penalty scored)		(penalty scored) Becvinovski; (penalty scored) Steele; (penalty scored) Lavale; (penalty scored) Donnell; (penalty scored) Auglah; (penalty scored) Mauragis; (penalty scored) Mantell; (penalty scored) Redmayne; (penalty scored) Roux; (penalty scored) McCann; (penalty missed) McCaskey

== Statistics ==
=== Appearances and goals ===
Includes all competitions. Players with no appearances not included in the list.

As of 21 November 2026

No.	Pos.	Nat.	Name	A-League Men		Australia Cup		Total	
No.	Pos.	Nat.	Name	Apps	Goals	Apps	Goals	Apps	Goals
3	DF	(Australia)	Lucas Herrington	5	0	0	0	5	0
5	DF	(Australia)	Lucas Mauragis	5	0	1	0	6	0
6	MF	(Australia)	Haine Eames	5	0	0	0	5	0
8	MF	(Australia)	Chris Donnell	5	0	1	0	6	0
9	FW	(Australia)	Oliver Lavale	5	3	1	1	6	4
11	FW	(England)	John-Kymani Gordon	0+2	0	0	0	2	0
12	DF	(Scotland)	Noah McCann	5	0	1	0	6	0
15	DF	(Australia)	Storm Roux	4	0	1	0	5	0
16	MF	(Australia)	Harry Steele	0	0	0+1	0	1	0
17	FW	(Australia)	Presley Ortiz	0+4	0	0	0	4	0
22	FW	(Australia)	Arthur De Lima	1+3	0	1	0	5	0
30	GK	(Australia)	Andrew Redmayne	5	0	1	0	6	0
37	FW	(Australia)	Bailey Brandtman	5	0	1	0	6	0
39	MF	(Australia)	Alex Bolton	3+2	0	0	0	5	0
41	DF	(Australia)	Shumba Mutokoyi	0+2	0	1	0	3	0
42	FW	(Australia)	Max Naylor	0+1	0	0	0	1	0
43 (Note: Luke Becvinovski made one appearance in the Australia Cup as number 17.)	FW	(Australia)	Luke Becvinovski	0+3	0	0+1	0	4	0
44	MF	(Australia)	Oliver O’Carroll	0	0	1	0	1	0
45	MF	(Australia)	Jesse Mantell	0+5	0	0+1	0	6	0
46 (Note: Callum McCaskey made one appearance in the Australia Cup as number 55.)	DF	(Australia)	Callum McCaskey	0	0	0+1	0	1	0
51	DF	(Australia)	Ty McKibbin	1+1	0	0	0	2	0
52	FW	(Australia)	Isaac Kwon	1+1	0	0	0	2	0
72	FW	(Iraq)	Ali Auglah	5	1	1	0	6	1

=== Disciplinary record ===
Includes all competitions. The list is sorted by squad number when total cards are equal. Players with no cards not included in the list.

As of 21 November 2026

Rank	No.	Pos.	Nat.	Name	A-League Men			Australia Cup			Total		
Rank	No.	Pos.	Nat.	Name	Yellow card	(yellow card) (yellow-red card)	Red card	Yellow card	(yellow card) (yellow-red card)	Red card	Yellow card	(yellow card) (yellow-red card)	Red card
1	72	FW	(Iraq)	Ali Auglah	3	0	0	0	0	0	3	0	0
2	8	MF	(Australia)	Chris Donnell	2	0	0	0	0	0	2	0	0
2	45	MF	(Australia)	Jesse Mantell	1	0	0	1	0	0	2	0	0
4	9	FW	(Australia)	Oliver Lavale	1	0	0	0	0	0	1	0	0
4	12	DF	(Scotland)	Noah McCann	0	0	0	1	0	0	1	0	0
4	15	DF	(New Zealand)	Storm Roux	0	0	0	1	0	0	1	0	0
4	37	FW	(Australia)	Bailey Brandtman	1	0	0	0	0	0	1	0	0
4	39	MF	(Australia)	Alex Bolton	1	0	0	0	0	0	1	0	0
4	41	DF	(Australia)	Shumba Mutokoyi	1	0	0	0	0	0	1	0	0
Total					10	0	0	3	0	0	13	0	0

=== Clean sheets ===
Includes all competitions.

As of 21 November 2026

Rank	No.	Nat.	Goalkeeper	A-League Men	Australia Cup	Total
1	30	(Australia)	Andrew Redmayne	1	0	1
Total				1	0	1

== See also ==
- 2026–27 Central Coast Mariners FC (women) season
- List of Central Coast Mariners FC seasons
