= 2025–26 Central Coast Mariners FC season =

Central Coast Mariners
2025–26 season
- Chairman: Vacant
- Head Coach: Warren Moon
- Stadium: Industree Group Stadium
- A-League Men: 9th
- A-League Men Finals: DNQ
- Top goalscorer: League: Sabit Ngor (6); All: Sabit Ngor (6)
- Highest home attendance: 11,517 vs. Brisbane Roar (31 December 2025); A-League Men
- Lowest home attendance: 1,601 vs. Macarthur FC (18 January 2026); A-League Men
- Average home league attendance: 5,104
- Biggest win: 4–0 vs. Adelaide United (A) (4 January 2026); A-League Men
- Biggest defeat: 0–4 vs. Newcastle Jets (A) (25 April 2026); A-League Men
Home colours	Away colours	Third colours
- All statistics correct as of 26 April 2026.

The 2025–26 season was the Central Coast Mariners Football Club's 21st season in the A-League Men.

== Players ==
Note: Flags indicate national team as defined under FIFA eligibility rules; some limited exceptions apply. Players may hold more than one non-FIFA nationality.

No.	Pos.	Nation	Player
2	DF	AUS	James Donachie
3	DF	AUS	Nathan Paull
4	DF	AUS	Trent Sainsbury (captain)
5	DF	AUS	Lucas Mauragis
6	MF	AUS	Haine Eames (scholarship)
7	FW	AUS	Christian Theoharous
8	MF	NIR	Alfie McCalmont
10	FW	AUS	Miguel Di Pizio
11	FW	AUS	Sabit Ngor
15	DF	NZL	Storm Roux
16	MF	AUS	Harry Steele
17	FW	JPN	Kaito Taniguchi
18	FW	AUS	Nathanael Blair

No.	Pos.	Nation	Player
20	DF	AUS	Will Kennedy
21	MF	NZL	Seth Clark
22	FW	AUS	Arthur De Lima (scholarship)
23	FW	AUS	Oliver Lavale
24	DF	AUS	Diesel Herrington
26	MF	MAS	Brad Tapp
30	GK	AUS	Andrew Redmayne
37	FW	AUS	Bailey Brandtman (scholarship)
39	FW	AUS	Logan Sambrook (scholarship)
40	GK	AUS	Dylan Peraić-Cullen
48	MF	AUS	Chris Donnell
50	GK	AUS	Jai Ajanovic (scholarship)
72	FW	IRQ	Ali Auglah

== Transfers and contracts ==
=== Transfers in ===
No.	Position	Player	Transferred from	Type/fee	Contract length	Date	Ref
30	GK	Andrew Redmayne	Unattached	Free transfer	1 year	15 August 2025	
2	DF	James Donachie	(Australia) Sydney Olympic	Free transfer	1 year	5 September 2025	
20	DF	Will Kennedy	Sydney FC	Free transfer	1 year	17 September 2025	
27	MF	Alexi Houridis	Melbourne Victory NPL	Free transfer	1 year scholarship	18 September 2025	
33	MF	James Houridis	Melbourne Victory NPL	Free transfer	1 year scholarship	18 September 2025	
11	FW	Sabit Ngor	(Australia) Heidelberg United	End of loan	(1 year)	29 September 2025	
	MF	(Brazil) Mikael Doka	(Japan) Ventforet Kofu	End of loan	(1.5 years)	31 December 2025	
72	FW	Ali Auglah	(Australia) Sydney Olympic	Free transfer		14 January 2026	
23	FW	Oliver Lavale	(Australia) South Melbourne	Free transfer		14 January 2026	
48	MF	Chris Donnell	(Australia) Sydney Olympic	Free transfer	6 months	16 January 2026	
18	FW	Nathanael Blair	Perth Glory	Free transfer	6 months	21 January 2026	
17	FW	(Japan) Kaito Taniguchi	(Japan) Albirex Niigata	Free transfer		30 January 2026	
21	MF	(New Zealand) Seth Clark	(Australia) Sydney Olympic	Free transfer	6 months	30 January 2026	

=== Transfers out ===
No.	Position	Player	Transferred to	Type/fee	Date	Ref
30	GK	Jack Warshawsky	(Australia) Oakleigh Cannons	End of contract	26 June 2025	
5	DF	Noah Smith	(Australia) Adelaide City	End of contract	30 June 2025	
3	DF	(Vanuatu) Brian Kaltak	Perth Glory	End of contract	30 June 2025	
9	FW	Alou Kuol	Western Sydney Wanderers	Mutual contract termination	30 June 2025	
27	DF	Sasha Kuzevski	Unattached	End of contract	30 June 2025	
28	MF	(Kenya) William Wilson	Unattached	End of contract	30 June 2025	
10	MF	(Brazil) Mikael Doka	(Japan) Ventforet Kofu	Loan	2 July 2025	
11	FW	(Brazil) Vitor Feijão	(Azerbaijan) Kapaz	Mutual contract termination	8 August 2025	
	MF	(Brazil) Mikael Doka	(Brazil) Operário Ferroviário	Undisclosed	1 January 2026	
21	FW	(Iraq) Abdelelah Faisal	(Iraq) Al-Karma	Mutual contract termination	5 January 2026	
1	GK	Adam Pavlesic	(Australia) Sydney United 58	Mutual contract termination	22 January 2026	
27	MF	Alexi Houridis	Unattached	Mutual contract termination	22 January 2026	
33	MF	James Houridis	Unattached	Mutual contract termination	22 January 2026	
9	FW	(England) Ryan Edmondson	(Republic of Ireland) St Patrick's Athletic	Mutual contract termination	27 January 2026	
14	FW	Nicholas Duarte	(Australia) Heidelberg United	Loan	11 February 2026	

=== Contract extensions ===
No.	Player	Position	Duration	Date	Notes	Ref.
7	Christian Theoharous	Winger	1 year	1 September 2025		
14	Nicholas Duarte	Striker	2 years	2 September 2025	Scholarship contract	
37	Bailey Brandtman	Striker	2 years	2 September 2025	Scholarship contract	

== Pre-season and friendlies ==
24 August 2025	Brisbane Roar (Australia)	2–0	(Australia) Central Coast Mariners	Sunshine Coast, Australia
13:30 AEST	Vidic 39'; McGarry 83'	Report		Stadium: Sunshine Coast Stadium; Attendance: 6,815

20 September 2025	Western Sydney Wanderers (Australia)	1–1	(Australia) Central Coast Mariners	Sydney, Australia
	Borrello 30' (pen.)	Report	De Lima 88'	Stadium: Wanderers Football Park; Attendance: 0 (behind closed doors)

27 September 2025	Central Coast Mariners (Australia)	0–2	(New Zealand) Auckland FC	Australia
		Report	Cosgrove 60', 86'	Attendance: 0 (behind closed doors)

1 October 2025	Sydney FC (Australia)	0–1	(Australia) Central Coast Mariners	Sydney, Australia
		Report	Edmondson 29'	Stadium: Leichhardt Oval; Attendance: 0 (behind closed doors)

12 October 2025	Central Coast Mariners (Australia)	0–3	(New Zealand) Wellington Phoenix	Gosford, Australia
		Report	Rufer; Eze	Stadium: polytec Stadium

== Competitions ==
=== Overall record ===
Competition	First match	Last match	Starting round	Final position	Record							
Competition	First match	Last match	Starting round	Final position	Pld	W	D	L	GF	GA	GD	Win %
A-League Men	19 October 2025	25 April 2026	Matchday 1	9th	26	8	8	10	35	42	−7	30.77
Total					26	8	8	10	35	42	−7	30.77

Last updated: 25 April 2026
Source: Soccerway

=== A-League Men ===
==== League table ====
Pos	Team	Pld	W	D	L	GF	GA	GD	Pts
7	Macarthur FC	26	9	7	10	37	44	−7	34
8	Wellington Phoenix (Note: Auckland FC and Wellington Phoenix cannot qualify for Asian Football Confederation competitions as they are based in New Zealand, which is part of the Oceania Football Confederation.)	26	9	6	11	36	48	−12	33
9	Central Coast Mariners	26	8	8	10	35	42	−7	32
10	Perth Glory	26	8	7	11	32	39	−7	31
11	Brisbane Roar	26	6	8	12	27	36	−9	26

Source: A-Leagues
Rules for classification: 1) points; 2) goal difference; 3) goals scored; 4) wins; 5) head-to-head results; 5a) head-to-head points; 5b) head-to-head goal difference; 6) Fair Play points; 7) away goal difference; 8) away goals per match; 9) home goal difference; 10) home goals per match; 11) toss of a coin in an event of a tie of two clubs.

==== Results summary ====
Overall								Home						Away					
Pld	W	D	L	GF	GA	GD	Pts	W	D	L	GF	GA	GD	W	D	L	GF	GA	GD
26	8	8	10	35	42	−7	32	3	7	3	17	17	0	5	1	7	18	25	−7

Last updated: 25 April 2026.
Source: Ultimate A-League

==== Results by round ====
Round	1	2	3	4	5	6	7	8	9	10	11	12	13	14	15	16	18	20	19	21	22	23	17	24	25	26
Ground	H	A	H	A	A	H	H	H	A	H	A	A	H	A	H	A	H	A	H	H	A	H	A	H	A	A
Result	W	L	D	W	L	D	L	L	L	L	W	L	D	D	W	W	W	D	W	D	L	D	L	D	W	L
Position	3	7	8	5	6	7	8	9	12	12	11	12	11	12	11	10	7	7	6	6	7	9	9	9	8	9
Points	3	3	4	7	7	8	8	8	8	8	11	11	12	13	16	19	22	23	26	27	27	28	28	29	32	32

Updated to match(es) played on 25 April 2026. Source: Ultimate A-League
A = Away; H = Home; W = Win; D = Draw; L = Loss

==== Matches ====
Win Draw Loss Fixtures

19 October 2025 1	Central Coast Mariners	3–2	Newcastle Jets	Gosford
15:00 AEDT	McCalmont 28' (pen.); Di Pizio 30'; Duarte 90+8'	Report	Badolato 14'; Rose 80'	Stadium: polytec Stadium; Attendance: 8,002; Referee: Shaun Evans

25 October 2025 2	Sydney FC	2–0	Central Coast Mariners	Sydney
19:35 AEDT	Campuzano 58'; Wood 90'	Report		Stadium: Leichhardt Oval; Attendance: 10,700; Referee: Ben Abraham

2 November 2025 3	Central Coast Mariners	1–1	Wellington Phoenix	Gosford
17:00 AEDT	Ngor 52'	Report	Eze 4'	Stadium: Polytec Stadium; Attendance: 4,813; Referee: Tim Danaskos

7 November 2025 4	Perth Glory	0–1	Central Coast Mariners	Perth
17:45 AWST		Report	Brandtman 57'	Stadium: HBF Park; Attendance: 5,889; Referee: Shane Skinner

22 November 2025 5	Western Sydney Wanderers	3–2	Central Coast Mariners	Sydney
17:00 AEDT	Kraev 1'; Barbarouses 11', 23' (pen.)	Report	Mauragis 9'; McCalmont 39' (pen.)	Stadium: CommBank Stadium; Attendance: 6,557; Referee: Daniel Elder

29 November 2025 6	Central Coast Mariners	0–0	Melbourne City	Gosford
17:00 AEDT		Report		Stadium: Polytec Stadium; Attendance: 3,127; Referee: Eric Saba

6 December 2025 7	Central Coast Mariners	1–2	Sydney FC	Gosford
20:30 AEDT	Tapp 10'	Report	Toure 29'; Campuzano 68'	Stadium: Polytech Stadium; Attendance: 3,571; Referee: Ben Abraham
Note: The match was originally scheduled for 19:35, but was delayed to 20:30 due to adverse weather conditions.

12 December 2025 8	Central Coast Mariners	1–2	Auckland FC	Gosford
19:35 AEDT	Elliot 33' (o.g.)	Report	Randall 20'; Cosgrove 58'	Stadium: polytec Stadium; Attendance: 1,942; Referee: Jack Morgan

21 December 2025 9	Wellington Phoenix	3–1	Central Coast Mariners	Wellington
15:00 NZDT	Piper 36'; James 49' (pen.); Armiento 52'	Report	Ngor 45+6'	Stadium: Sky Stadium; Attendance: 3,587; Referee: Tim Danaskos

31 December 2025 10	Central Coast Mariners	1–2	Brisbane Roar	Gosford
19:00 AEDT	Mauragis 29'	Report	Ruhs 22'; Vidic 90+2'	Stadium: Polytec Stadium; Attendance: 11,517; Referee: Alex King

4 January 2026 11	Adelaide United	0–4	Central Coast Mariners	Adelaide
19:05 ACDT		Report	McCalmont 8' (pen.); Ngor 20'; Brandtman 22'; Di Pizio 55'	Stadium: Coopers Stadium; Attendance: 12,325; Referee: Daniel Cook

10 January 2026 12	Perth Glory	3–0	Central Coast Mariners	Perth
18:45 AWT		Report	Pennington 24'; Taggart 45+1'; Lawrence 54'	Stadium: HBF Park; Attendance: 7,912; Referee: Ben Abraham

18 January 2026 13	Central Coast Mariners	1–1	Macarthur FC	Gosford
14:00 AEDT	Ngor 77'	Report	Vickery 67'	Stadium: Polytec Stadium; Attendance: 1,601; Referee: Ben Abraham
Note: Match was postponed due to torrential rain.

24 January 2026 14	Auckland FC	2–2	Central Coast Mariners	Auckland
17:00 NZDT	Randall 12'; Cosgrove 58'	Report	Lavale 44', 89'	Stadium: Go Media Stadium; Attendance: 10,225; Referee: Adam Kersey

1 February 2026 15	Central Coast Mariners	1–0	Melbourne Victory	Gosford
17:00 AEDT	Auglah 35'	Report		Stadium: Polytec Stadium; Attendance: 3,865; Referee: Tim Danaskos

7 February 2026 16	Brisbane Roar	1–2	Central Coast Mariners	Kippa-Ring
16:00 AEST	D'Agostino 44'	Report	Di Pizio 45+2'; Roux 79'	Stadium: Kayo Stadium; Attendance: 5,714; Referee: Lachlan Keevers

22 February 2026 18	Central Coast Mariners	3–2	Western Sydney Wanderers	Gosford
17:00 AEDT	Auglah 55'; Blair 77'; Donachie 89'	Report	Thurgate 8'; Ibusuki 69'	Stadium: Polytec Stadium; Attendance: 4,506; Referee: Shane Skinner

28 February 2026 19	Central Coast Mariners	0–0	Newcastle Jets	Gosford
17:00 AEDT		Report		Stadium: polytec Stadium; Attendance: 9,033; Referee: Lachlan Keevers

5 March 2026 20	Macarthur FC	1–3	Central Coast Mariners	Sydney
19:25 AEDT	Caceres 67'	Report	McCalmont 37' (pen.); Brandtman 65'; Blair 84'	Stadium: Campbelltown Stadium; Attendance: 2,915; Referee: Sam Kelly

14 March 2026 21	Central Coast Mariners	1–1	Adelaide United	Gosford
15:00 AEDT	Ngor 59'	Report	Alagich 88'	Stadium: Polytec Stadium; Attendance: 4,727; Referee: Ben Abraham

21 March 2026 22	Melbourne Victory	4–1	Central Coast Mariners	Melbourne
17:00 AEDT	Velupillay 50'; Mata 54'; Vergos 90+1'; Davidson 90+4'	Report	Ngor 7'	Stadium: AAMI Park; Attendance: 9,506; Referee: Alex King

4 April 2026 23	Central Coast Mariners	2–2	Perth Glory	Gosford
12:00 AEDT	Auglah 37'; Brandtman 66'	Report	Despotovski 14'; Taggart 17'	Stadium: polytec Stadium; Attendance: 4,232; Referee: Ben Abraham

7 April 2026 17	Melbourne City	2–1	Central Coast Mariners	Melbourne
19:00 AEDT	Kuen 22'; Nabbout 67'	Report	Auglah 90+4'	Stadium: AAMI Park; Attendance: 3,211; Referee: Daniel Elder
Note: The match was postponed from 13 February due to Melbourne City's participation in the 2025–26 AFC Champions League Elite.

10 April 2026 24	Central Coast Mariners	2–2	Brisbane Roar	Gosford
19:35 AEST	Mantell 53'; Brandtman 58'	Report	Klein 4'; Lauton 90+3'	Stadium: polytec Stadium; Attendance: 5,421; Referee: Nathan Shakespear

19 April 2026 25	Auckland FC	0–1	Central Coast Mariners	Auckland
15:00 NZST		Report	Auglah 19'	Stadium: Go Media Stadium; Attendance: 14,019; Referee: Jonathan Barreiro

25 April 2026 26	Newcastle Jets	4–0	Central Coast Mariners	Newcastle
17:00 AEST	Dobson 21'; Taylor 25'; Adams 44'; Mizunuma 85'	Report		Stadium: McDonald Jones Stadium; Attendance: 20,930; Referee: Calvin Berg

== Statistics ==
=== Appearances and goals ===
Includes all competitions. Players with no appearances not included in the list.

As of 25 April 2026

No.	Pos.	Nat.	Name	A-League Men		Total	
No.	Pos.	Nat.	Name	Apps	Goals	Apps	Goals
2	DF	(Australia)	James Donachie	19+2	1	21	1
3	DF	(Australia)	Nathan Paull	13+4	0	17	0
5	DF	(Australia)	Lucas Mauragis	26	2	26	2
6	MF	(Australia)	Haine Eames	9+7	0	16	0
7	FW	(Australia)	Christian Theoharous	3+13	0	16	0
8	MF	(Northern Ireland)	Alfie McCalmont	18+1	4	19	4
10	MF	(Australia)	Miguel Di Pizio	17+2	3	19	3
11	FW	(Australia)	Sabit Ngor	15+10	6	25	6
15	DF	(New Zealand)	Storm Roux	24+1	1	25	1
16	MF	(Australia)	Harry Steele	12+8	0	20	0
17	FW	(Japan)	Kaito Taniguchi	4+3	0	7	0
18	FW	(Australia)	Nathanael Blair	4+9	3	13	3
20	DF	(Australia)	Will Kennedy	2+5	0	7	0
22	FW	(Australia)	Arthur De Lima	3+10	0	13	0
23	FW	(Australia)	Oliver Lavale	12+2	2	14	2
24	DF	(Australia)	Diesel Herrington	2+4	0	6	0
26	MF	(Malaysia)	Brad Tapp	25+1	1	26	1
30	GK	(Australia)	Andrew Redmayne	26	0	26	0
37	FW	(Australia)	Bailey Brandtman	12+11	4	23	4
42	MF	(Australia)	Laurence Taylor	0+1	0	1	0
43	DF	(Australia)	Jacob Nasso	2+6	0	8	0
42	MF	(Australia)	Jesse Mantell	3+1	1	4	1
48	MF	(Australia)	Chris Donnell	13+1	0	14	0
72	FW	(Iraq)	Ali Auglah	14	5	14	5
Player(s) transferred out but featured this season
9	FW	(England)	Ryan Edmondson	5+4	0	9	0
14	FW	(Australia)	Nicholas Duarte	3+8	1	11	1
21	FW	(Iraq)	Abdelelah Faisal	0+4	0	4	0

=== Disciplinary record ===
Includes all competitions. The list is sorted by squad number when total cards are equal. Players with no cards not included in the list.

As of 25 April 2026

Rank	No.	Pos.	Nat.	Name	A-League Men			Total		
Rank	No.	Pos.	Nat.	Name	Yellow card	(yellow card) (yellow-red card)	Red card	Yellow card	(yellow card) (yellow-red card)	Red card
1	3	DF	(Australia)	Nathan Paull	3	0	1	3	0	1
2	4	DF	(Australia)	James Donachie	6	0	0	6	0	0
3	37	FW	(Australia)	Bailey Brandtman	4	0	0	4	0	0
4	5	DF	(Australia)	Lucas Mauragis	3	0	0	3	0	0
4	8	MF	(Northern Ireland)	Alfie McCalmont	3	0	0	3	0	0
4	15	DF	(New Zealand)	Storm Roux	3	0	0	3	0	0
4	16	MF	(Australia)	Harry Steele	3	0	0	3	0	0
4	20	DF	(Australia)	Will Kennedy	3	0	0	3	0	0
4	26	MF	(Malaysia)	Brad Tapp	3	0	0	3	0	0
10	11	FW	(Australia)	Sabit Ngor	2	0	0	2	0	0
10	23	FW	(Australia)	Oliver Lavale	2	0	0	2	0	0
10	72	FW	(Iraq)	Ali Auglah	2	0	0	2	0	0
13	1	GK	(Australia)	Andrew Redmayne	1	0	0	1	0	0
13	6	MF	(Australia)	Haine Eames	1	0	0	1	0	0
13	7	FW	(Australia)	Christian Theoharous	1	0	0	1	0	0
13	18	FW	(Australia)	Nathanael Blair	1	0	0	1	0	0
13	22	FW	(Australia)	Arthur De Lima	1	0	0	1	0	0
13	24	DF	(Australia)	Diesel Herrington	1	0	0	1	0	0
13	48	MF	(Australia)	Chris Donnell	1	0	0	1	0	0
Player(s) transferred out but featured this season
1	14	FW	(Australia)	Nicholas Duarte	1	0	0	1	0	0
Total					41	0	1	41	0	1

=== Clean sheets ===
Includes all competitions.

As of 25 April 2026

Rank	No.	Nat.	Goalkeeper	A-League Men	Total
1	30	(Australia)	Andrew Redmayne	6	6
Total				6	6

== See also ==
- List of Central Coast Mariners FC seasons
