= A-League Men transfers for 2026–27 season =

Australian soccer season transfers

This is a list of Australian soccer transfers for the 2026–27 A-League Men. Only moves featuring at least one A-League Men club are listed.

Clubs were able to sign players at any time, but many transfers only officially went through on 1 July because the majority of player contracts finished on 30 June.

== Transfers ==
All players without a flag are Australian. Clubs without a flag are clubs participating in the A-League Men.

=== Pre-season ===
Date	Name	Moving from	Moving to
24 April 2026	(France) Damien Da Silva	Macarthur FC	Retired
25 April 2026	Josh Risdon	Perth Glory	Retired
8 May 2026	(Greece) Georgios Vrakas	Brisbane Roar	Unattached
5 June 2026	Kaelan Majekodunmi	(Australia) Dandenong Thunder	Perth Glory (end of loan)
9 June 2026	Mark Birighitti	Perth Glory	Unattached
19 June 2026	(New Zealand) Tim Payne	Wellington Phoenix	(Paraguay) Club Olimpia
20 June 2026	(New Zealand) Adama Coulibaly	Auckland FC	(New Zealand) Auckland United
24 June 2026	Kaelan Majekodunmi	Perth Glory	(Australia) Olympic Kingsway
24 June 2026	Brandon O'Neill	Perth Glory	(Australia) Perth RedStar (loan)
25 June 2026	Zach Lisolajski	Perth Glory	(Australia) Preston Lions
25 June 2026	Luca Tevere	Perth Glory	(Australia) Preston Lions
25 June 2026	Bailey O'Neil	Adelaide United	(Australia) Adelaide City
26 June 2026	Joshua Brillante	Western Sydney Wanderers	(Australia) Bankstown City
26 June 2026	Tomislav Uskok	Macarthur FC	(Australia) Bankstown City
26 June 2026	Christian Theoharous	Central Coast Mariners	(Australia) Heidelberg United
27 June 2026	(Ivory Coast) Adama Traoré	Melbourne Victory	(Australia) Avondale
30 June 2026	Ben Warland	Brisbane Roar	(Australia) Olympic FC
27 June 2026	Antonee Burke-Gilroy	Brisbane Roar	(Australia) Preston Lions
27 June 2026	(New Zealand) Seth Clark	Central Coast Mariners	(Australia) Sydney Olympic
30 June 2026	(Lebanon) Austin Ayoubi	Adelaide United	Unattached
30 June 2026	Jake Girdwood-Reich	Auckland FC	(United States) St. Louis City (end of loan)
30 June 2026	Dan Hall	Auckland FC	(Japan) JEF United Chiba
30 June 2026	Marlee Francois	Auckland FC	Unattached
30 June 2026	(New Zealand) Finn McKenlay	Auckland FC	Unattached
30 June 2026	(New Zealand) Jesse Randall	Auckland FC	(Scotland) Dundee United
30 June 2026	(Costa Rica) Youstin Salas	Brisbane Roar	(Costa Rica) Sporting San José (end of loan)
30 June 2026	(Norway) Marius Lode	Brisbane Roar	(Sweden) BK Häcken (end of loan)
30 June 2026	Austin Ludwik	Brisbane Roar	(Australia) Gold Coast Knights
30 June 2026	Sam Klein	Brisbane Roar	(Germany) FC St. Pauli
30 June 2026	(England) Chris Long	Brisbane Roar	Unattached
30 June 2026	Michael Ruhs	Brisbane Roar	Unattached
30 June 2026	Nicholas D'Agostino	Brisbane Roar	(Norway) Viking (end of loan)
30 June 2026	(Republic of Ireland) Jay O'Shea	Brisbane Roar	Unattached
30 June 2026	Ben Halloran	Brisbane Roar	Unattached
30 June 2026	James Donachie	Central Coast Mariners	Unattached
30 June 2026	(Northern Ireland) Alfie McCalmont	Central Coast Mariners	Unattached
30 June 2026	(Japan) Kaito Taniguchi	Central Coast Mariners	(Japan) Mito HollyHock
30 June 2026	Nathanael Blair	Central Coast Mariners	(Ukraine) Veres Rivne
30 June 2026	Brad Tapp	Central Coast Mariners	(Malaysia) Johor Darul Ta'zim
30 June 2026	Logan Sambrook	Central Coast Mariners	Unattached
30 June 2026	Matthew Jurman	Macarthur FC	(Australia) Sutherland Sharks
30 June 2026	(Croatia) Šime Gržan	Macarthur FC	Unattached
30 June 2026	Chris Ikonomidis	Macarthur FC	Unattached
30 June 2026	Anthony Caceres	Macarthur FC	(Thailand) Bangkok United
30 June 2026	(Poland) Filip Kurto	Macarthur FC	(Australia) Sydney Olympic
30 June 2026	Mitchell Duke	Macarthur FC	(Japan) Machida Zelvia
30 June 2026	Frans Deli	Macarthur FC	(Australia) APIA Leichhardt
30 June 2026	Luke Brattan	Macarthur FC	Unattached
30 June 2026	Joshua Damevski	Macarthur FC	Unattached
30 June 2026	(South Korea) Ji Dong-won	Macarthur FC	Unattached
30 June 2026	Ryan Teague	Melbourne City	(Belgium) Mechelen (end of loan)
30 June 2026	Daniel Arzani	Melbourne City	(Hungary) Ferencváros (end of loan)
30 June 2026	(France) Samuel Souprayen	Melbourne City	Unattached
30 June 2026	Marcus Younis	Melbourne City	(Denmark) Brøndby (end of loan)
30 June 2026	(Austria) Andreas Kuen	Melbourne City	Unattached
30 June 2026	(Kosovo) Elbasan Rashani	Melbourne City	Unattached
30 June 2026	Josh Rawlins	Melbourne Victory	(Scotland) Dundee United
30 June 2026	Reno Piscopo	Melbourne Victory	Unattached
30 June 2026	Sebastian Esposito	Melbourne Victory	(Italy) Lecce (end of loan)
30 June 2026	(Portugal) Roderick Miranda	Melbourne Victory	Unattached
30 June 2026	Emre Sağlam	Melbourne Victory	(Turkey) Gençlerbirliği (end of loan)
30 June 2026	Kayne Razmovski	Melbourne Victory	Unattached
30 June 2026	(Spain) Juan Mata	Melbourne Victory	Unattached
30 June 2026	Lachlan Rose	Newcastle Jets	(Scotland) Dundee United
30 June 2026	Clayton Taylor	Newcastle Jets	(England) Barnsley
30 June 2026	(Japan) Kota Mizunuma	Newcastle Jets	(Japan) Urawa Red Diamonds
30 June 2026	Noah James	Newcastle Jets	Unattached
30 June 2026	Mark Natta	Newcastle Jets	Unattached
30 June 2026	Ben van Dorssen	Newcastle Jets	Unattached
30 June 2026	Christian Bracco	Newcastle Jets	Unattached
30 June 2026	Nicholas Pennington	Perth Glory	Unattached
30 June 2026	Lachlan Wales	Perth Glory	Unattached
30 June 2026	Cameron Cook	Perth Glory	Unattached
30 June 2026	(South Sudan) Joel Anasmo	Perth Glory	Unattached
30 June 2026	Corey Hollman	Sydney FC	Unattached
30 June 2026	(Peru) Piero Quispe	Sydney FC	(Mexico) UNAM (end of loan)
30 June 2026	(Germany) Ahmet Arslan	Sydney FC	Unattached
30 June 2026	Apostolos Stamatelopoulos	Sydney FC	(Scotland) Motherwell (end of loan)
30 June 2026	(Nigeria) Josh Oluwayemi	Wellington Phoenix	Unattached
30 June 2026	(Canada) Manjrekar James	Wellington Phoenix	Unattached
30 June 2026	(Nigeria) Ifeanyi Eze	Wellington Phoenix	Unattached
30 June 2026	Paulo Retre	Wellington Phoenix	(Australia) South Melbourne
30 June 2026	(New Zealand) Sarpreet Singh	Wellington Phoenix	(Serbia) TSC (end of loan)
30 June 2026	Nikola Mileusnic	Wellington Phoenix	Unattached
30 June 2026	Carlo Armiento	Wellington Phoenix	Unattached
30 June 2026	(New Zealand) Daniel Edwards	Wellington Phoenix	Unattached
30 June 2026	(Norway) Sander Kartum	Wellington Phoenix	(Scotland) Heart of Midlothian (end of loan)
30 June 2026	(Lebanon) Ramy Najjarine	Wellington Phoenix	(Egypt) El Qanah
30 June 2026	(New Zealand) Luke Supyk	Wellington Phoenix	Unattached
30 June 2026	(New Zealand) Kosta Barbarouses	Western Sydney Wanderers	Unattached
30 June 2026	Phillip Cancar	Western Sydney Wanderers	Unattached
30 June 2026	Jacob Farrell	Western Sydney Wanderers	(England) Portsmouth (end of loan)
30 June 2026	Ruon Tongyik	Western Sydney Wanderers	Unattached
30 June 2026	(Bulgaria) Bozhidar Kraev	Western Sydney Wanderers	Unattached
30 June 2026	Aidan Simmons	Western Sydney Wanderers	(Japan) Tochigi City
30 June 2026	Alou Kuol	Western Sydney Wanderers	(Australia) Blacktown City
1 July 2026	(New Zealand) Lachlan Bayliss	Newcastle Jets	Auckland FC
1 July 2026	(Germany) Marko Ilic	(Germany) TSV Havelse	Brisbane Roar
1 July 2026	Sabit Ngor	Central Coast Mariners	Brisbane Roar
1 July 2026	Joel King	Sydney FC	Brisbane Roar
1 July 2026	Tate Russell	(Australia) Wollongong Wolves	Brisbane Roar
1 July 2026	Jacob Nasso	Central Coast Mariners Academy	Brisbane Roar
1 July 2026	Emin Durakovic	Melbourne City	Brisbane Roar
1 July 2026	Oliver O'Carroll	Melbourne City Youth	Central Coast Mariners
1 July 2026	Nathan Paull	Central Coast Mariners	Macarthur FC
1 July 2026	Ben Gibson	Newcastle Jets	Macarthur FC
1 July 2026	Jing Reec	Melbourne Victory	Macarthur FC
1 July 2026	Jonathan Aspropotamitis	Unattached	Macarthur FC
1 July 2026	James Hilton	Auckland FC	Macarthur FC
1 July 2026	Kosta Grozos	Newcastle Jets	Macarthur FC
1 July 2026	Quinn MacNicol	Brisbane Roar	Melbourne City
1 July 2026	(Greece) Nikos Vergos	Melbourne Victory	Newcastle Jets
1 July 2026	Zane Schreiber	Melbourne City	Newcastle Jets
1 July 2026	Patrick Wood	Sydney FC	Newcastle Jets
1 July 2026	(England) Joe Lolley	Sydney FC	Newcastle Jets
1 July 2026	Matthew Dench	Brisbane Roar	Perth Glory
1 July 2026	(Malta) Lucas Scicluna	Newcastle Jets	Perth Glory
1 July 2026	Calem Nieuwenhof	(Scotland) Heart of Midlothian	Perth Glory (loan)
1 July 2026	Henry Hore	Brisbane Roar	Perth Glory
1 July 2026	(Vietnam) Khoa Ngo	(Vietnam) Cong An Ho Chi Minh City	Perth Glory (loan return)
1 July 2026	Jake Hollman	Unattached	Sydney FC
1 July 2026	Gabriel Popovic	Perth Glory	Sydney FC
1 July 2025	Aaron Gurd	(Thailand) Kanchanaburi Power	Sydney FC (loan return)
1 July 2026	(New Zealand) James McGarry	Brisbane Roar	Wellington Phoenix
1 July 2026	Miguel Di Pizio	Central Coast Mariners	Western Sydney Wanderers
1 July 2026	(New Zealand) Liam Gillion	Auckland FC	Western Sydney Wanderers
1 July 2026	Panashe Madanha	Adelaide United	Western Sydney Wanderers
2 July 2026	Eli Adams	Newcastle Jets	(Japan) Gamba Osaka
2 July 2026	(Japan) Takahiro Sekine	(Japan) Urawa Red Diamonds	Sydney FC
2 July 2026	Oscar Gonzalez	(Australia) APIA Leichhardt	Newcastle Jets
2 July 2026	(Scotland) Noah McCann	Unattached	Central Coast Mariners
2 July 2026	Richard Nkomo	Newcastle Jets	(Australia) South Melbourne
3 July 2026	(New Zealand) Gabriel Sloane-Rodrigues	Wellington Phoenix	Unattached
3 July 2026 (Note: Player was released to free agency before joining new club.)	Will Kennedy	Central Coast Mariners	Newcastle Jets
4 July 2026	(England) Callum Timmins	Perth Glory	(Cambodia) Phnom Penh Crown (loan)
5 July 2026	Harry Shillington	Melbourne City	Melbourne Victory
6 July 2026	Harry Sawyer	Macarthur FC	Melbourne Victory
7 July 2026	Connor Pain	Unattached	Macarthur FC
7 July 2026	Max Naylor	(Australia) Fremantle City	Central Coast Mariners
8 July 2026	Nicolas Milanovic	(Scotland) Aberdeen	Western Sydney Wanderers
8 July 2026	Lachlan Jackson	Melbourne Victory	Perth Glory
10 July 2026	Kristian Popovic	Macarthur FC	Central Coast Mariners
10 July 2026	Daniel Solsky	(Australia) Wollongong Wolves	Perth Glory
10 July 2026	(Germany) Philipp Ziereis	(Germany) Greuther Fürth	Melbourne Victory
10 July 2026	Yaya Dukuly	Adelaide United	(Slovenia) Celje
10 July 2026	Paul Okon-Engstler	Sydney FC	(Germany) 1. FC Köln
11 July 2026	(Wales) Tom Lockyer	Unattached	Melbourne Victory
15 July 2026	(Argentina) Germán Ferreyra	Melbourne City	Western Sydney Wanderers
17 July 2026	(New Zealand) Henry Gray	(England) Ipswich Town	Wellington Phoenix (loan)
17 July 2026	Luka Jovanovic	Adelaide United	(United States) San Jose Earthquakes
17 July 2026	Luke Becvinovski	Melbourne City Youth	Central Coast Mariners
19 July 2026	Patrick Beach	Melbourne City	(France) Troyes
20 July 2026	Alex Grant	Sydney FC	Newcastle Jets
20 July 2026	Jacob Brazete	Brisbane Roar	Adelaide United
20 July 2026	Alex Bolton	(Sweden) AIK	Central Coast Mariners
20 July 2026	(Belgium) Louis Verstraete	Auckland FC	(Belgium) Patro Eisden
22 July 2026	Macklin Freke	Brisbane Roar	Melbourne City
22 July 2026	(New Zealand) Aaron Cartwright	Melbourne City Youth	Auckland FC
24 July 2026	Aaron Calver	(Australia) Hume City	Auckland FC
24 July 2026	Noah Hooper	Western Sydney Wanderers Youth	Central Coast Mariners
25 July 2026	(South Korea) Nam Tae-hee	(South Korea) Jeju SK	Brisbane Roar
28 July 2026	(New Zealand) Luke Brooke-Smith	Wellington Phoenix	(England) Portsmouth
29 July 2026	(Brazil) Matheus Rossetto	(Brazil) Fortaleza	Melbourne City (loan)
3 August 2026	Lachie Middleton	Sydney FC	(United States) Liberty Flames
3 August 2026	(Scotland) Kai Kennedy	Unattached	Macarthur FC
6 August 2026	(Scotland) Tom Aldred	Unattached	Brisbane Roar
6 August 2026	Awer Mabil	(Spain) Castellón	Melbourne City
12 August 2026	(Vietnam) Khoa Ngo	Perth Glory	(Vietnam) Cong An Ho Chi Minh City
14 August 2026	Stevan Rujak	Western Sydney Wanderers Youth	Central Coast Mariners
16 August 2026	(Nigeria) Oriola Sunday	(Japan) RB Omiya Ardija	Sydney FC (loan)
18 August 2026	(Mexico) Rafael Durán	Macarthur FC	Wellington Phoenix
19 August 2026	Nishan Velupillay	Melbourne Victory	(Germany) FC Ingolstadt 04
20 August 2026	(Denmark) Emiliano Marcondes	Unattached	Melbourne City
21 August 2026	(New Zealand) Bailey Ferguson	Auckland FC	Unattached
24 August 2026	(Moldova) Virgiliu Postolachi	(Romania) Universitatea Cluj	Brisbane Roar
28 August 2026	Tyrese Francois	Unattached	Brisbane Roar
28 August 2026	Zach Harrison	Brisbane Roar Youth	Sydney FC
28 August 2026	Adam Taggart	Perth Glory	(Vietnam) Hanoi FC
31 August 2026	(Scotland) Ryan Fraser	Western Sydney Wanderers	Macarthur FC
1 September 2026	Max Court	(Australia) APIA Leichhardt	Brisbane Roar
1 September 2026	(New Zealand) Riley Bidois	(United States) Monterey Bay	Wellington Phoenix (loan)
2 September 2026	Cher Deng	(Australia) Lions FC	Perth Glory
3 September 2026	Denver Minster	(Australia) Gold Coast United	Adelaide United
3 September 2026	Mitchell Smith	(Spain) Real Zaragoza	Adelaide United
3 September 2026	(Japan) Tatsuki Nara	(Japan) Avispa Fukuoka	Macarthur FC (loan)
7 September 2026	James Overy	(England) Manchester United Youth	Sydney FC
7 September 2026	Musa Toure	(Denmark) Randers FC	Macarthur FC
10 September 2026	(England) Scott Wootton	Perth Glory	Retired
13 September 2026	(Uruguay) Guillermo May	Auckland FC	Melbourne Victory
14 September 2026	(Scotland) Max Anderson	Unattached	Wellington Phoenix
14 September 2026	Zac De Jesus	Sydney FC	(Australia) Wollongong Wolves (loan)
14 September 2026	Julian Recchia	Melbourne City NPL	Newcastle Jets
14 September 2026	Apostolos Stamatelopoulos	(Scotland) Motherwell	Macarthur FC
16 September 2026	(United States) Bryce Duke	(United States) San Diego FC	Wellington Phoenix
16 September 2026	Walter Scott	Macarthur FC	Wellington Phoenix
16 September 2026	Dylan Rose	(Australia) Sydney United 58	Macarthur FC
16 September 2026	Presley Ortiz	(Australia) APIA Leichhardt	Central Coast Mariners
16 September 2026	Jacob Farrell	(England) Portsmouth	Sydney FC (loan)
16 September 2026	Arion Sulemani	Perth Glory	(Australia) Oakleigh Cannons
16 September 2026	(New Zealand) Marley Leuluai	Unattached	Auckland FC
17 September 2026	Gabriel Tilo	(Australia) Sydney United 58	Central Coast Mariners
17 September 2026	Aaron Gurd	Sydney FC	(Australia) Sydney Olympic (loan)
17 September 2026	Mitch Glasson	Sydney FC	(Australia) Marconi Stallions (loan)
17 September 2026	(Costa Rica) Julio Cascante	Unattached	Melbourne City
17 September 2026	(New Zealand) Matt Ellis	(New Zealand) Auckland City	Perth Glory
17 September 2026	Pieter Jacobsz	(Australia) Perth Azzurri	Perth Glory
17 September 2026	Sebastian Kukucka	(Australia) Sydney Olympic	Perth Glory
17 September 2026	(Jamaica) Daniel Scarlett	(Jamaica) Chapelton Maroons	Central Coast Mariners
17 September 2026	(Nigeria) Rufai Abubakar	(Nigeria) Mavlon	Central Coast Mariners
18 September 2026	Nicholas Duarte	(Australia) Heidelberg United	Central Coast Mariners (end of loan)
18 September 2026	Nicholas Duarte	Central Coast Mariners	(Australia) Wollongong Wolves (loan)
22 September 2026	Akol Akon	Sydney FC	(United States) Colorado Rapids
22 September 2026	Akol Akon	(United States) Colorado Rapids	Sydney FC (loan)
30 September 2026	Malual Nichola	Adelaide United	(Australia) Adelaide City (loan)
6 October 2026	(England) John-Kymani Gordon	Unattached	Central Coast Mariners
13 October 2026	(Japan) Taiyo Hisamatsu	Unattached	Central Coast Mariners
14 October 2026	Lachlan Charles	Melbourne City	(Australia) Oakleigh Cannons (loan)

=== Mid-season ===
Date	Name	Moving from	Moving to
22 October 2026	(Republic of Ireland) Jay O'Shea	Unattached	Perth Glory
