= William Kennedy =

William Kennedy may refer to:

== Arts and entertainment ==
- William Kennedy (author) (born 1928), American Pulitzer-winning novelist
- William Stetson Kennedy (1916–2011), American author and civil rights activist
- William Kennedy (poet) (1799–1871), Scottish poet, journalist, and diplomat
- William Kennedy (painter) (1859–1918), Scottish painter
- William Denholm Kennedy (1813–1865), Scottish historical, genre and landscape painter
- William Kennedy (drummer), drummer for Yellowjackets

== Politics and law ==
- William Kennedy (North Carolina politician) (1768–1834), U.S. Congressman from North Carolina
- William Kennedy (New Jersey politician) (1775–1826), American politician, acting governor of New Jersey
- William Kennedy (Montana politician) (1835–1904), miner, restaurant and hotel proprietor, 8th mayor of Missoula, Montana
- William Kennedy (Wisconsin politician) (1841–1910), American lawyer and legislator
- William Kennedy (New York politician) (1851–1913), American lawyer and politician from New York
- William Kennedy (Connecticut politician) (1854–1918), United States congressman from Connecticut
- William Nassau Kennedy (1839–1885), Manitoba politician, mayor of Winnipeg
- William James Kennedy (politician) (1857–1912), Manitoba politician
- William Walker Kennedy (1882–1963), Manitoba politician and lawyer
- William Farris Kennedy (1888–1951), British Columbia politician
- William Costello Kennedy (1868–1923), Canadian businessman and politician
- William Rann Kennedy (1846–1915), British jurist and Lord Justice of Appeal, classical scholar
- William Francis Kennedy (died 1874), member of the Queensland Legislative Assembly
- William H. Kennedy III (active since 1993), American lawyer and associate counsel to president Clinton

== Sports ==
- William Kennedy (Scottish footballer) (fl. 1890s)
- William Kennedy (footballer, born 1890) (1890–1915), English footballer
- Bill Kennedy (Scottish footballer) (William Kennedy; 1912–1989), Scottish footballer
- Bill Kennedy (New Zealand footballer) (William Kennedy)
- Bill Kennedy (footballer, born 1875) (William Patrick Kennedy, 1875–1939), Australian rules footballer
- William Kennedy (high jumper) (1898–1992), Canadian Olympic athlete
- William Kennedy (runner) (born 1884), American marathoner, 3rd at the 1927 USA Outdoor Track and Field Championships
- William Kennedy (cricketer) (1853–1889), New Zealand cricketer
- William Kennedy (rugby league, born 1969), Australian rugby league player
- William Kennedy (rugby league, born 1997), Australian rugby league player
- Bill Kennedy (American football) (William James Kennedy, 1919–1998), American football player
- Bill Kennedy (baseball, born 1918) (William Gorman Kennedy, 1918–1995), American baseball pitcher
- Bill Kennedy (baseball, born 1921) (William Aulton Kennedy, 1921–1983), American baseball pitcher
- Bill Kennedy (basketball) (William R. Kennedy, 1938–2006), American basketball player
- Bill Kennedy (referee) (William Gene Kennedy, born 1966), American basketball referee
- Billy Kennedy (basketball) (William Joseph Kennedy Jr., born 1964), American basketball coach
- Bill Kennedy (swimmer) (William Ray Kennedy, born 1952), Canadian swimmer
- Will Kennedy (soccer) (born 2005), Australian footballer
- Willie Kennedy, Irish footballer

== Other ==
- William Kennedy (explorer) (1814–1890), Canadian sailor and searcher for John Franklin
- William Kennedy (Royal Navy officer) (1838–1916), British admiral
- William Clark-Kennedy (1879–1961), Canadian serviceman and recipient of the Victoria Cross
- William Quarrier Kennedy (1903–1979), British geologist
- William James Kennedy (active since 1990), British geologist
- William John Kennedy (1919–2005), activist for the rights of Australian Aborigines
- William John Kennedy (photographer) (1930–2021), American photographer
- William Parker Kennedy (1892–1968), president of the Brotherhood of Railroad Trainmen (BRT) from 1949 to 1962
- William Kennedy (priest) (died 1940), Anglican priest in Ireland
- W. P. M. Kennedy (William Paul McClure Kennedy, 1879–1963), Canadian historian and legal scholar

== See also ==
- Bill Kennedy (disambiguation)
- Billy Kennedy (disambiguation)
