= Bill Kennedy =

Bill Kennedy may refer to:

== Sports ==
=== Baseball ===
- Bill Kennedy (baseball, born 1918) (1918–1995), American baseball player
- Bill Kennedy (baseball, born 1921) (1921–1983), American baseball player
- Brickyard Kennedy (1867–1915), also known as Bill, American baseball player

=== Football ===
- Bill Kennedy (footballer, born 1875) (1875–1939), Australian rules footballer for Collingwood
- Bill Kennedy (footballer, born 1882) (1882–1970), Australian rules footballer for St Kilda
- Bill Kennedy (Scottish footballer) (1912–1989), footballer with Southampton F.C.
- Bill Kennedy (American football) (1919–1998), American football player
- Bill Kennedy (New Zealand footballer), international footballer, c. 1967

=== Other sports ===
- Bill Kennedy (basketball) (1938–2006), American basketball player
- Bill Kennedy (referee) (born 1966), American basketball referee
- Bill Kennedy (swimmer) (born 1952), Canadian swimmer
- Bill Kennedy (runner), on List of winners of the Boston Marathon for 1917

== Other uses ==
- Bill Kennedy (actor) (1908–1997), American actor, voice artist and TV show host
- Bill Kennedy (politician) (1919–2001), Australian politician

== See also ==
- Billy Kennedy (disambiguation)
- William Kennedy (disambiguation)
