= Central Coast Mariners FC–Western Sydney Wanderers FC rivalry =

Soccer rivalry in Australia

- Location: New South Wales
- Teams: Central Coast Mariners; Western Sydney Wanderers
- First meeting: 6 October 2012; A-League; WS Wanderers 0–0 CC Mariners
- Latest meeting: 22 February 2026; A-League Men; CC Mariners 3–2 WS Wanderers
- Stadiums: Central Coast Stadium (CC Mariners); Western Sydney Stadium (WS Wanderers)

Statistics
- Total meetings: 39
- Most wins: Western Sydney Wanderers (17)
- Top scorer: Brendon Santalab (7)
- All-time series: Central Coast Mariners: 12; Drawn: 10; Western Sydney Wanderers: 17
- Largest victory: CC Mariners 0–4 WS Wanderers (22 February 2025)

The Central Coast Mariners FC–Western Sydney Wanderers FC rivalry is a rivalry between New South Wales-based clubs Central Coast Mariners and Western Sydney Wanderers. They are the only two Australian clubs to have won Asian continental club competitions; Wanderers with the 2014 AFC Champions League title and Mariners as the last AFC Cup winners.

== History of the rivalry ==
The first meeting between the two teams was an A-League match on 6 October 2012, for the Western Sydney Wanderers' first competitive match. The result was a 0–0 draw in front of more than 10,000 spectators at Parramatta Stadium.

The rivalry begun to form between the two teams in April 2013, when the 2013 A-League Grand Final was played on Wanderers' home soil. Central Coast finished the game with a 2–0 victory earn themselves their first A-League Championship title.

On 28 January 2023, the two clubs contested a highly anticipated league fixture, as the Mariners sat second on the A-League Men table and the Wanderers sat third, only two points behind. The match was marred by a moment of aggression from the Wanderers active support bay towards the Central Coast Mariners fans sitting in General Admission, following an equalizer from Yeni Ngbakoto after Sam Silvera had opened the scoring for the Mariners 5 minutes prior. Wanderers fans were widely condemned for "charging at families" in celebration, with video footage captured and posted on Twitter of them jumping over the tarping that separated them from the Mariners fans and storming their bay. The match ended in a 2–2 draw.

== Results ==
Competition	#	Date	Home team	Score	Away team	Goals (Mariners)	Goals (Wanderers)	Venue	Attendance^{a}
2012–13 A-League	1	6 October 2012	Western Sydney	0–0	Central Coast	—	—	Parramatta Stadium	10,458
2012–13 A-League	2	6 January 2013	Western Sydney	0–2	Central Coast	McBreen 41', 90+5'	—	Parramatta Stadium	16,387
2012–13 A-League	3	2 March 2013	Central Coast	0–1	Western Sydney	—	Haliti 80'	Central Coast Stadium	18,721
2013 A-League Grand Final	4	21 April 2013	Western Sydney	0–2	Central Coast	Zwaanswijk 43', McBreen 67' (pen.)	—	Sydney Football Stadium	42,102
2013–14 A-League	5	12 October 2013	Central Coast	1–1	Western Sydney	Duke 55'	Juric 87'	Central Coast Stadium	17,134
2013–14 A-League	6	23 December 2013	Western Sydney	2–0	Central Coast	—	Juric 20', Hersi 33'	Parramatta Stadium	15,786
2013–14 A-League	7	29 March 2014	Central Coast	2–1	Western Sydney	Rose 32', Ibini-Isei 90'	Topor-Stanley 40'	Central Coast Stadium	13,157
2013–14 A-League Finals	8	26 April 2014	Western Sydney	2–0	Central Coast	—	Hersi 31', La Rocca 81'	Parramatta Stadium	19,216
2014–15 A-League	9	19 November 2014	Western Sydney	0–0	Central Coast	—	—	Parramatta Stadium	14,691
2014–15 A-League	10	1 January 2015	Western Sydney	0–0	Central Coast	—	—	Parramatta Stadium	14,137
2014–15 A-League	11	11 April 2015	Central Coast	1–0	Western Sydney	Rose 2'	—	Central Coast Stadium	9,548
2015–16 A-League	12	29 November 2015	Central Coast	0–2	Western Sydney	—	Santalab 66', Nichols 90+3'	Central Coast Stadium	10,519
2015–16 A-League	13	23 January 2016	Central Coast	1–2	Western Sydney	Ferreira 67'	Bridge 11', Santalab 88'	Central Coast Stadium	13,105
2015–16 A-League	14	1 April 2016	Western Sydney	4–1	Central Coast	García 21'	Castelen 8', Santalab 36', 52', Nichols 83'	Parramatta Stadium	14,855
2016–17 A-League	15	29 October 2016	Western Sydney	1–1	Central Coast	Berry 61'	Santalab 2'	Sydney Showground Stadium	12,168
2016–17 A-League	16	3 December 2016	Central Coast	1–4	Western Sydney	Powell 5'	Kusukami 6', Martínez 31', McGing 50' (o.g.), Santalab 87'	Central Coast Stadium	11,075
2016–17 A-League	17	12 February 2017	Western Sydney	0–2	Central Coast	O'Donovan 65' (pen.), 78'	—	Sydney Showground Stadium	9,618
2017–18 A-League	18	14 October 2017	Western Sydney	2–2	Central Coast	Asdrúbal 21', De Silva 63'	Riera 39', Bonevacia 69'	Sydney Showground Stadium	11,650
2017–18 A-League	19	16 December 2017	Central Coast	0–2	Western Sydney	—	Santalab 27', Cejudo 50'	Central Coast Stadium	7,199
2017–18 A-League	20	4 January 2018	Central Coast	1–2	Western Sydney	Skapetis 76'	Sotirio 14', Riera 30'	Central Coast Stadium	7,046
2018–19 A-League	21	7 December 2018	Western Sydney	2–0	Central Coast	—	Baccus 45+3', Sotirio 68'	Sydney Showground Stadium	8,163
2018–19 A-League	22	9 February 2019	Western Sydney	2–0	Central Coast	—	Elrich 45', Sotirio 77'	Sydney Showground Stadium	7,064
2018–19 A-League	23	20 April 2019	Central Coast	3–1	Western Sydney	Simon 34', 52 (pen.)', Rowles 56'	Bridge 67' (pen.)	Central Coast Stadium	5,059
2019–20 A-League	24	12 October 2019	Western Sydney	2–1	Central Coast	Đurić 36'	Duke 41', 82 (pen.)'	Western Sydney Stadium	17,091
2019–20 A-League	25	2 February 2020	Central Coast	1–3	Western Sydney	Simon 82' (pen.)	Müller 42', Duke 76' (pen.)	Central Coast Stadium	5,053
2019–20 A-League	26	27 July 2020	Central Coast	1–1	Western Sydney	Đurić 59'	Cox 88'	Central Coast Stadium	1,035
2020–21 A-League	27	19 January 2021	Central Coast	0–1	Western Sydney	—	Müller 83'	Central Coast Stadium	4,659
2020–21 A-League	28	6 April 2021	Western Sydney	2–2	Central Coast	Simon 22', Bozanic 83' (pen.)	Kamau 74', 78'	Western Sydney Stadium	9,755
2021–22 A-League	29	18 December 2021	Central Coast	2–0	Western Sydney	Goddard 59', Bozanic 90+7'	—	Central Coast Stadium	4,389
2021–22 A-League	30	13 April 2022	Western Sydney	2–2	Central Coast	Nkololo 64' (pen.), Hall 90+5'	Rowles 41' (o.g.), Petratos 54'	Western Sydney Stadium	4,212
2022–23 A-League Men	31	5 November 2022	Western Sydney	0–3	Central Coast	Ruhs 66', 72', Silvera 81'	—	Western Sydney Stadium	9,142
2022–23 A-League Men	32	28 January 2023	Central Coast	2–2	Western Sydney	Silvera 30', Cummings 73'	Ngbakoto 35', Borrello 60'	Central Coast Stadium	8,565
2022–23 A-League Men	33	4 March 2023	Western Sydney	2–0	Central Coast	—	Borrello 26', Amalfitano 60'	Western Sydney Stadium	9,899
2023–24 A-League Men	34	6 January 2024	Western Sydney	0–1	Central Coast	Túlio 25'	—	Western Sydney Stadium	11,982
2023–24 A-League Men	35	18 February 2024	Central Coast	1–0	Western Sydney	Doka 83' (pen.)	—	Central Coast Stadium	7,568
2024–25 A-League Men	36	17 January 2025	Western Sydney	1–3	Central Coast	Kuol 14', Edmondson 69', Doka 90'	Temelkovski 85'	Western Sydney Stadium	6,718
2024–25 A-League Men	37	22 February 2025	Central Coast	0–4	Western Sydney	—	Sapsford 6', Clisby 13', Milanovic 40', Antonsson 72' (pen.)	Central Coast Stadium	7,723
2025–26 A-League Men	36	22 November 2025	Western Sydney	3–2	Central Coast	Mauragis 9', McCalmont 39' (pen.)	Kraev 1', Barbarouses 11', 23' (pen.)	Western Sydney Stadium	6,557
2025–26 A-League Men	37	22 February 2026	Central Coast	3–2	Western Sydney	Auglah 55', Blair 77', Donachie 89'	Thurgate 8', Ibusuki 69'	Central Coast Stadium	4,506

== Statistics and records ==
As of 22 February 2026, there have been 39 competitive meetings between the two teams, of which Central Coast have won 12 and Western Sydney 17. The biggest winning margin was a 4–0 away win on 22 February 2025 for Western Sydney.

=== Results ===
As of 22 February 2026

Competition	Matches played	Central Coast wins	Draws	Western Sydney wins	Central Coast goals	Western Sydney goals
League	39	12	10	17	44	56
Australia Cup	0	0	0	0	0	0
Total	39	12	10	17	44	56

=== Top scorers ===
Rank	Scorer	Clubs'	Goals
1	(Australia) Brendon Santalab	Western Sydney Wanderers	7
2	(Australia) Mitch Duke	Central Coast Mariners, Western Sydney Wanderers	4
2	(Australia) Matt Simon	Central Coast Mariners	4
4	(Australia) Daniel McBreen	Central Coast Mariners	3
4	(Australia) Jaushua Sotirio	Western Sydney Wanderers	3

== Crossing the divide ==
Twenty-three players have played for both Central Coast and Western Sydney since 2012. The first player to have played for both clubs, however, predated the start of the rivalry; Michael Beauchamp joined Central Coast in 2005 and Western Sydney upon their admission to the A-League in 2012. Ruon Tongyik and Jack Clisby are the only players to have played for both clubs to have returned to their original club afterwards. Statistics are sourced from ALeagueStats.com and updated as of 19 January 2024.

=== Central Coast, then Western Sydney ===
Name	Pos	Central Coast			Western Sydney		
Name	Pos	Career	Apps	Goals	Career	Apps	Goals
Michael Beauchamp	DF	2005–2006	29	0	2012–2014	44	2
Dean Heffernan	DF	2005–2010	83	10	2013–2014	14	0
Andrew Redmayne	GK	2008–2009	3	0	2015–2016	37	0
Liam Reddy	GK	2013–2015	63	0	2016	6	0
Matt Sim	MF	2014–2015	34	7	2016	1	0
Nick Fitzgerald	MF	2010, 2013–2015	86	9	2018–2019	15	0
Mitch Duke	FW	2011–2015	83	15	2018–2019, 2021	54	24
Ziggy Gordon	DF	2019–2020	30	0	2020–2022	40	2
Bernie Ibini-Isei	FW	2010–2014	96	21	2020–2022	48	6
Oliver Bozanic	MF	2006, 2010–2013, 2020–2022	129	11	2022–2024	16	3

=== Western Sydney, then Central Coast ===
Name	Pos	Western Sydney			Central Coast		
Name	Pos	Career	Apps	Goals	Career	Apps	Goals
Kwabena Appiah	FW	2012–2014	38	0	2016–2018	40	4
Antony Golec	DF	2014–2015	37	0	2017–2018	32	0
Jacob Melling	MF	2016–2017	6	0	2018–2020	38	0
Jack Clisby	DF	2016–2018, 2023–	60	3	2018–2021	76	5
Mario Shabow	MF	2015–2017	3	0	2018–2019	11	1
Josh Macdonald	FW	2015	5	0	2018	2	0
Jonathan Aspropotamitis	DF	2015–2017	53	0	2019	13	0
Giancarlo Gallifuoco	DF	2019	7	0	2019–2020	11	1
Ruon Tongyik	DF	2018, 2022	6	0	2019–2022	42	1
Abraham Majok	FW	2017–2019	23	2	2019–2020	4	1
Nicolai Müller	FW	2019–2021	37	7	2021–2022	19	2
Nectarios Triantis	DF	2022	1	0	2022–2023	26	0
Thomas Aquilina	DF	2020–2022	42	0	2022–2023	13	0

== Clubs' honours ==
As of 7 May 2024, these are the football honours of Central Coast Mariners and Western Sydney Wanderers:

National Competition	Central Coast Mariners	Western Sydney Wanderers
A-League Men Premiership	3	1
A-League Men Championship	2	0
Australia Cup	0	0
Pre-Season Challenge Cup	1	0
Total	5	1

Asian competition	Central Coast Mariners	Western Sydney Wanderers
AFC Champions League	0	1
AFC Cup	1	0
Total	1	1

== Highest attendances ==
- Western Sydney 0–2 Central Coast; 42,102 (21 April 2013); Sydney Football Stadium (Western Sydney home)
- Western Sydney 2–0 Central Coast; 19,216 (26 April 2014); Parramatta Stadium (Western Sydney home)
- Central Coast 0–1 Western Sydney; 18,721 (2 March 2013); Central Coast Stadium (Central Coast home)
- Central Coast 1–1 Western Sydney; 17,134 (12 October 2013); Central Coast Stadium (Central Coast home)
- Western Sydney 2–1 Central Coast; 17,091 (12 October 2019); Western Sydney Stadium (Western Sydney home)
- Western Sydney 0–2 Central Coast; 16,387 (6 January 2013); Parramatta Stadium (Western Sydney home)
- Western Sydney 2–0 Central Coast; 15,786 (23 December 2013); Parramatta Stadium (Western Sydney home)
- Western Sydney 4–1 Central Coast; 14,855 (1 April 2016); Parramatta Stadium (Western Sydney home)
- Western Sydney 0–0 Central Coast; 14,691 (19 November 2014); Parramatta Stadium (Western Sydney home)
- Western Sydney 0–0 Central Coast; 14,137 (1 January 2015); Parramatta Stadium (Western Sydney home)
