= William J. Kennedy =

William J. Kennedy may refer to:

- William Kennedy (author)
- William Kennedy (Montana politician)
- William John Kennedy, activist for the rights of Australian Aboriginal people
- William John Kennedy (photographer) (1930–2021), American photographer

== See also ==
- William Kennedy (disambiguation)
