= List of Central Coast Mariners FC international footballers =

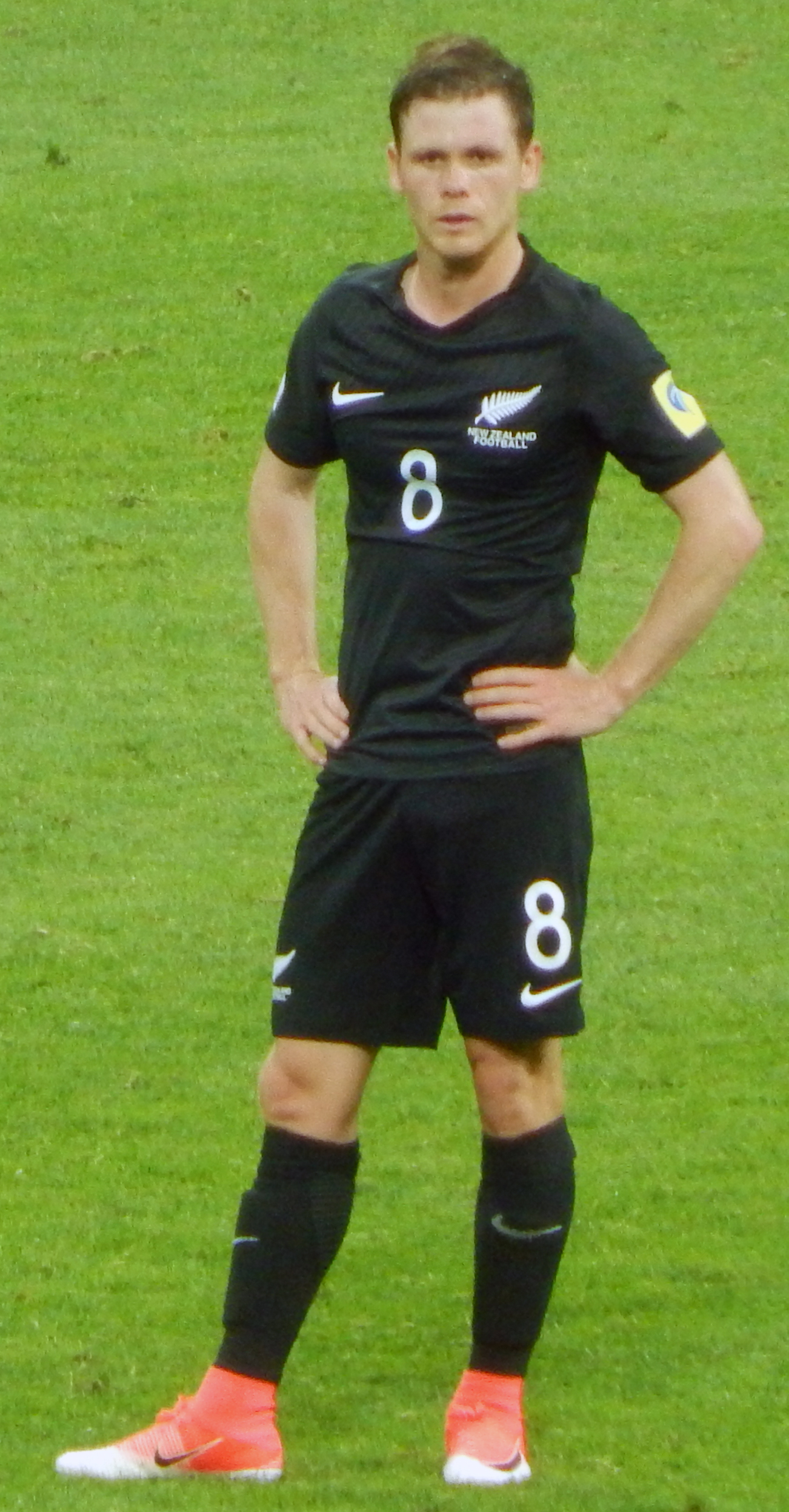
Michael McGlinchey made 27 international appearances (for New Zealand) while at the Mariners, the most of any player.

Central Coast Mariners Football Club is an Australian professional association football club based in Gosford, New South Wales. Founded in 2004, the team entered the A-League in its inaugural season in 2005–06.

Central Coast has been A-League Champions twice, in 2012–13 and 2022–23, and A-League Premiers twice, in 2007–08 and 2011–12. They play home games at Central Coast Stadium.

The following list contains all footballers who have represented their country at full international level whilst a Mariners player.

== Introduction ==
Central Coast's first international was defender Michael Beauchamp, who appeared for Australia on 22 February 2006, in a 3–1 win over Bahrain. New Zealand midfielder Michael McGlinchey is Central Coast's most-capped player, appearing in 27 games for his country between 2009 and 2019 while at the club.

The majority of Central Coast players that have received international caps are for Australia. In 2009, John Hutchinson became the first player to be capped for a nation outside of Australia or New Zealand while at the Mariners, when he made his debut for Malta.

Central Coast has some players who have represented their country in major international tournaments whilst at the club.

=== FIFA World Cup ===
The first Central Coast player to be selected for the FIFA World Cup was Michael Beauchamp, who was a surprise selection for Australia in the 2006 FIFA World Cup. He went on to join 1. FC Nürnberg after the tournament. Beauchamp did not make an appearance at the 2006 tournament, but did go on to take the field in the 2010 FIFA World Cup (after leaving the Mariners).

Michael McGlinchey was selected for New Zealand's squad at the 2010 FIFA World Cup, but did not make an appearance. He joined Motherwell on loan in the leadup to the competition, however, his loan deal expired on 9 May 2010, prior to the tournament's commencement.

Three Mariners players (Jason Cummings, Garang Kuol and Danny Vukovic) were selected in Australia's squad for the 2022 FIFA World Cup – the first time three or more players had been included in an Australian FIFA World Cup squad from a single A-League Men club. Kuol made two appearances off the bench in the tournament, while Cummings appeared once.

=== Continental tournaments ===
Michael McGlinchey was in the New Zealand team for the 2012 OFC Nations Cup. He made three appearances in the tournament as New Zealand finished third.

At the 2024 OFC Nations Cup, Mariners defender Brian Kaltak was named as captain of host nation Vanuatu.

== Key ==
- The following list contains only players who gained international caps whilst a registered player of Central Coast Mariners. Caps gained prior to joining and subsequent to leaving the club are not included.
- Table headings: Apps = Total number of appearances for the national side while a Mariners player; Goals = Total number of goals for the national side while a Mariners player; Years = Dates of international caps as a Mariners player; Ref = source of information
- Playing positions: GK = Goalkeeper; DF = Defender; MF = Midfielder; FW = Forward
- † Players with this colour and symbol in the "Name" column are currently signed to Central Coast.

== List of players ==
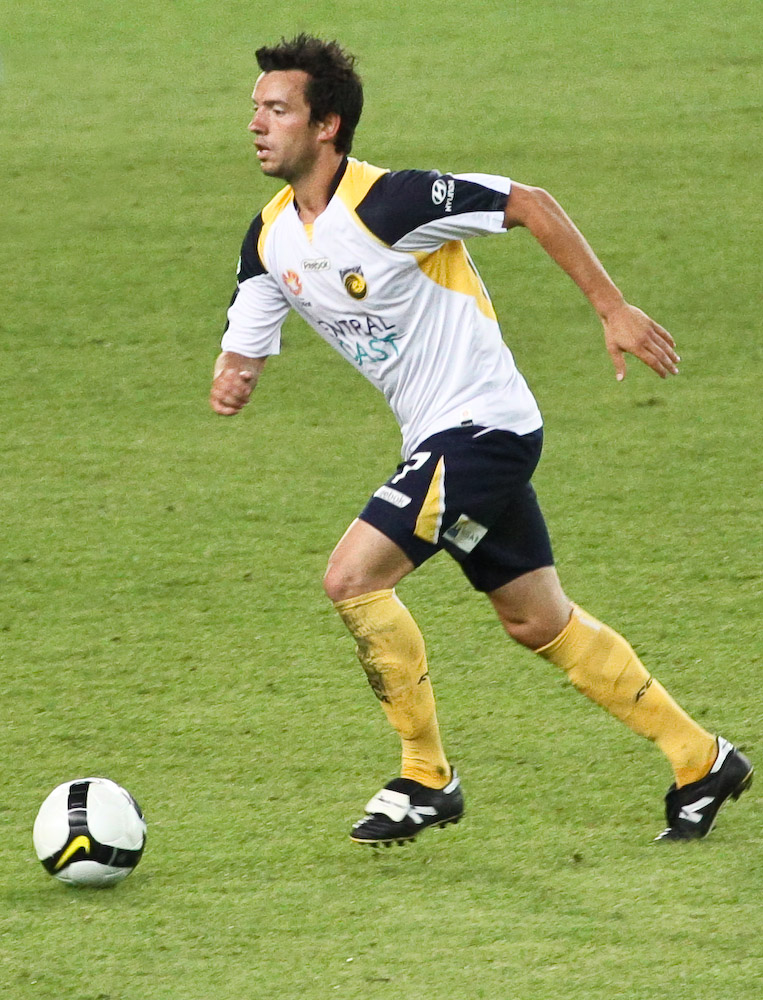
Midfielder John Hutchinson is Central Coast's all-time record appearance holder, and also had eleven caps for Malta.

As of 21 November 2026

List of Central Coast Mariners FC players making full international appearances
Name	Nation	Position	Intl. Years	Caps	Goals	Notes
John Aloisi	Australia	FW	2008	1	0	
Michael Beauchamp	Australia	DF	2006	2	0	
Jason Cummings	Australia	FW	2022–2023	3	1	(Note: Represented his country at the 2022 FIFA World Cup)
Mitchell Duke	Australia	FW	2013	4	2	
Dean Heffernan	Australia	DF	2009–2010	2	1	
Diesel Herrington †	Australia	DF	2026	2	0	
John Hutchinson	Malta	MF	2009–2011	11	0	
Mile Jedinak	Australia	MF	2008	3	0	
Brian Kaltak	Vanuatu	DF	2023–2024	9	0	
Garang Kuol	Australia	MF	2022	3	0	
Michael McGlinchey	New Zealand	MF	2009–2019	27	3	
Nik Mrdja	Australia	FW	2007	1	0	
Josh Nisbet	Australia	MF	2024	2	0	
Tom Rogic	Australia	MF	2012	4	0	
Storm Roux †	New Zealand	DF	2013–2024	13	0	
Kye Rowles	Australia	DF	2022	2	0	
Mathew Ryan	Australia	GK	2012	2	0	
Matt Simon	Australia	FW	2009	2	0	
Ruon Tongyik	Australia	DF	2021	2	0	
William Wilson	Kenya	MF	2025	4	1	
Tony Vidmar	Australia	DF	2006	1	0	
