= Billy Kennedy =

Billy Kennedy may refer to:

- Billy Kennedy (basketball) (born 1964), former head men's basketball coach at Texas A&M University
- Billy Kennedy (loyalist), see UDA West Belfast Brigade
- Billy Kennedy, Scottish musician, member of Frightened Rabbit since 2006
- Billy Kennedy, radio host and candidate for the U.S. House of Representatives in North Carolina in 2010

== Fictional characters ==
- Billy Kennedy (Neighbours), in the Australian TV soap opera Neighbours, played by Jesse Spencer
- Billy Kennedy, in the UK TV soap opera River City, played by Alexander Morton and Jon Morrison

== See also ==
- Bill Kennedy (disambiguation)
- William Kennedy (disambiguation)
