= Bill Kennedy (footballer, born 1882) =

Australian rules footballer

Personal information
- Full name: Bill Kennedy
- Born: 25 July 1882
- Died: 2 September 1970 (aged 88)
- Original team: Cumloden Old Boys

Playing career^{1}
Years	Club	Games (Goals)
1902	St Kilda	1 (0)
- ^{1} Playing statistics correct to the end of 1902.

Bill Kennedy (25 July 1882 – 2 September 1970) was an Australian rules footballer who played with St Kilda in the Victorian Football League (VFL).
