= Andrew Redmayne =

Australian soccer player (born 1989)

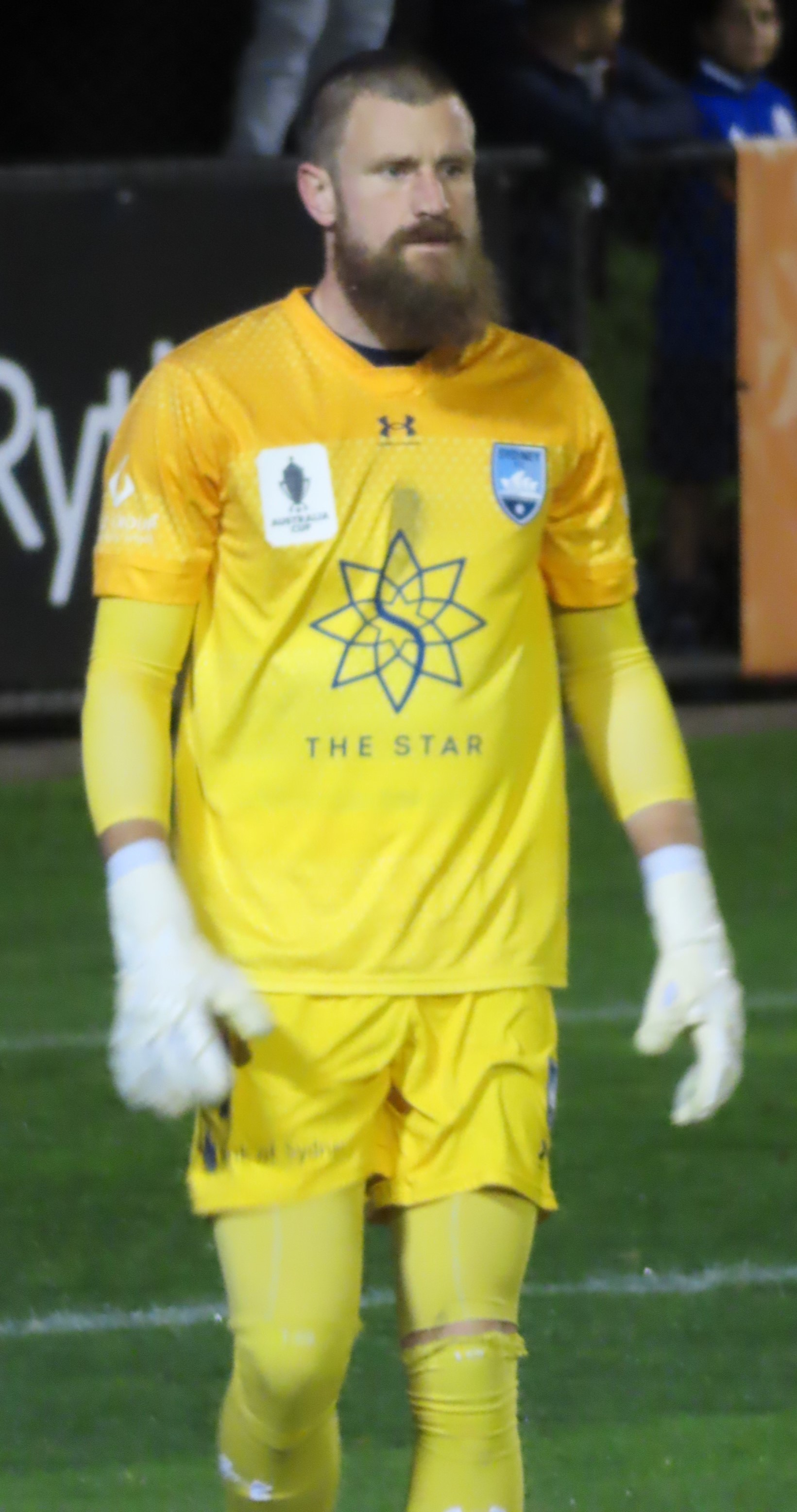
- Redmayne playing for Sydney FC in 2022

Personal information
- Full name: Andrew James Redmayne
- Date of birth: 13 January 1989 (age 37)
- Place of birth: Gosford, Australia
- Height: 1.94 m (6 ft 4 in)
- Position: Goalkeeper

Team information
- Current team: Central Coast Mariners
- Number: 30

Youth career
- 2005–2006: NSWIS
- 2006–2008: AIS

Senior career*
Years	Team	Apps	(Gls)
2007–2008	AIS	17	(0)
2008–2010	Central Coast Mariners	3	(0)
2010–2012	Brisbane Roar	2	(0)
2012–2015	Melbourne City (Note: Formerly known as Melbourne Heart.)	48	(0)
2015–2017	Western Sydney Wanderers	29	(0)
2017–2025	Sydney FC	192	(0)
2025–	Central Coast Mariners	31	(0)

International career^{‡}
2008–2009	Australia U20	25	(0)
2010–2011	Australia U23	6	(0)
2019–2022	Australia	4	(0)
- * Club domestic league appearances and goals as of 22 November 2026 ‡ National team caps and goals as of 25 September 2022

Andrew James Redmayne (born 13 January 1989) is an Australian professional soccer player who plays as a goalkeeper for Central Coast Mariners.

Redmayne was born in Gosford and played youth football with the Australian Institute of Sport Football Program before starting his professional career with Central Coast Mariners. After moving to Brisbane Roar in 2010, Redmayne moved to Melbourne Heart (now City) in 2012. In 2015, he transferred to Western Sydney Wanderers.

Redmayne has appeared for Australia at the U-20, U-23, and senior levels.

== Early life ==
Redmayne was born in Gosford, on the Central Coast of New South Wales.

== Club career ==
=== NSWIS and AIS ===
Redmayne played youth football with both the New South Wales Institute of Sport and the Australian Institute of Sport. As a result of a NSWIS tour of England, Redmayne had a short trial at Arsenal FC. Despite an initial offer of a move to England, Arsenal withdrew their offer after signing 15-year-old Wojciech Szczęsny instead. His time at the AIS included two seasons in the Victorian Premier League.

=== Central Coast Mariners ===
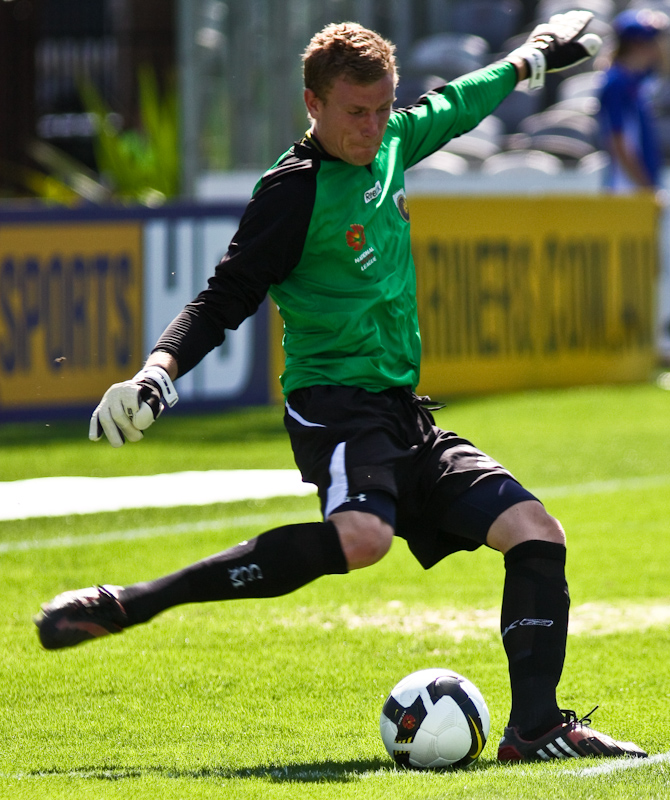
Redmayne playing for the Central Coast Mariners youth team

Redmayne signed with hometown club Central Coast Mariners for the 2007–08 A-League. Redmayne made his competitive debut for the club in September 2008, coming on as an early substitute for the injured Mark Bosnich in a win over Perth Glory. Redmayne made his starting debut for the club one week later in a 3–3 draw with Adelaide United.

Redmayne made what was to be his final competitive appearance for the Mariners in January 2010, a 2–0 loss to Wellington Phoenix.

=== Brisbane Roar ===
On 18 January 2010 it was announced he would be joining Brisbane Roar after failing to find regular game time at the Mariners. Redmayne made his debut for the club as an 80th-minute substitute for regular goalkeeper Michael Theoklitos in a 4–0 win at home to Gold Coast United. He made a second appearance for the Roar in the side's final match of the 2011–12 A-League regular season – again in a win over Gold Coast United.

=== Melbourne City ===
On 21 January 2012, Melbourne Heart announced the Redmayne as their first signing for the 2012–13 A-League season. In January 2013, he made his Heart debut in a victory over Newcastle Jets and was subsequently promoted to first-choice 'keeper at the club.

=== Western Sydney Wanderers ===
Redmayne returned to New South Wales to play for Western Sydney Wanderers in 2015.

=== Sydney FC ===
In January 2017, Redmayne moved to Sydney FC.

With first choice keeper Danny Vukovic out on international duty, Redmayne made his first appearance for the Sky Blues against Perth Glory keeping a clean sheet in a 3–0 win. With the departure of Vukovic, Redmayne began pre-season as first-choice and starting every match. He started the first game of the season against rivals Melbourne Victory, helping the team to a 1–0 win. He subsequently won the A-League Championship with Sydney in 2019 and again in 2020.

On 18 April 2025, Sydney FC have announced Redmayne will depart the club at the end of the season.

=== Return to Central Coast Mariners ===
Redmayne signed for Central Coast Mariners in August 2025, fifteen years after his first stint at the Mariners ended. On 19 October 2025, Redmayne made his first competitive game after rejoining the Mariners in an F3 Derby against Newcastle Jets in the A-League Men. With the score at 2–2, Redmayne saved a penalty from Eli Adams in stoppage time, before his goal kick led to a late winner from Nicholas Duarte. Redmayne took over the captaincy of the team in December, in the absence of regular captain Trent Sainsbury, and finished the season by winning the Mariners Medal.

== International ==
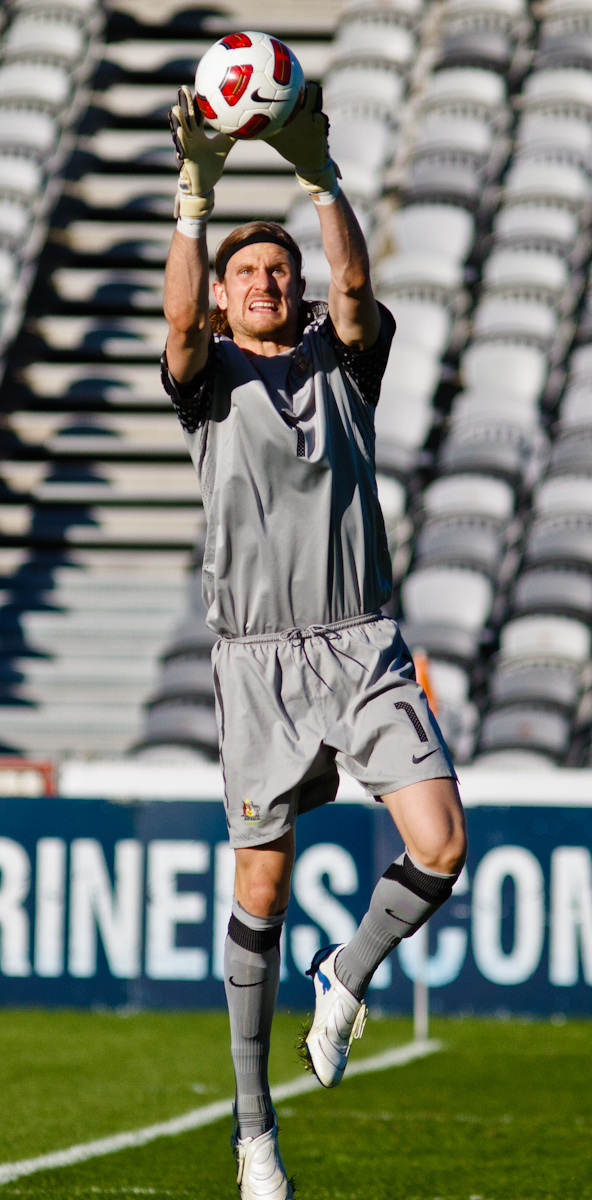
Redmayne playing for the Olyroos in 2011

=== Senior ===
Redmayne was first called up to the Australian national squad in June 2019 for a friendly against South Korea, after his performance in the 2019 A-League Grand Final. He made his international debut in the friendly, playing a full game as Australia lost 1–0.

Redmayne made his second appearance for the Socceroos in a win over Nepal in June 2021.

On 13 June 2022, Redmayne came off the bench for Australian captain Mathew Ryan in the 120th and final minute of Australia's FIFA World Cup play-off match against Peru, with the game scoreless and set to be decided by a penalty shoot-out. In the penalty shoot-out, he moved animatedly around his goal line in an attempt to put off the Peru players and saved the decisive penalty from Alex Valera to help secure Australia's qualification to the 2022 FIFA World Cup. In an interview after the game, Redmayne revealed that the tactic had been planned for months. Redmayne was nicknamed the "Grey Wiggle" after the match, due to similarities between Redmayne's animated movements before each penalty and signature dance moves of children's entertainers The Wiggles.

Redmayne's next appearance for Australia came in a 2–0 win over New Zealand in a friendly in September 2022.

Redmayne was selected in the Australian squad for the 2022 FIFA World Cup as a backup to Mat Ryan.

== Personal life ==
Outside of his football career, Redmayne has harboured ambitions to become a primary school teacher. During the 2022 FIFA World Cup in Qatar, Redmayne finished his studies and received his teaching degree during the tournament.

== Career statistics ==
=== Club ===
As of 30 May 2026

Club	Season	League			Australia Cup		Asia		Total	
Club	Season	Division	Apps	Goals	Apps	Goals	Apps	Goals	Apps	Goals
AIS	2007	Victorian Premier League	12	0	—		—		12	0
AIS	2008	Victorian Premier League	5	0	—		—		5	0
AIS	Total		17	0	—		—		17	0
Central Coast Mariners	2008–09	A-League	2	0	—		0	0	2	0
Central Coast Mariners	2009–10	A-League	1	0	—		—		1	0
Central Coast Mariners	Total		3	0	—		0	0	3	0
Brisbane Roar	2010–11	A-League	1	0	—		—		1	0
Brisbane Roar	2011–12	A-League	1	0	—		0	0	1	0
Brisbane Roar	Total		2	0	—		0	0	2	0
Melbourne City	2012–13	A-League	13	0	—		—		13	0
Melbourne City	2013–14	A-League	24	0	—		—		24	0
Melbourne City	2014–15	A-League	11	0	1	0	—		12	0
Melbourne City	Total		48	0	1	0	—		49	0
Western Sydney Wanderers	2015–16	A-League	23	0	3	0	—		26	0
Western Sydney Wanderers	2016–17	A-League	8	0	3	0	0	0	11	0
Western Sydney Wanderers	Total		31	0	6	0	0	0	37	0
Sydney FC	2016–17	A-League	1	0	0	0	—		1	0
Sydney FC	2017–18	A-League	28	0	5	0	6	0	39	0
Sydney FC	2018–19	A-League	29	0	5	0	5	0	39	0
Sydney FC	2019–20	A-League	27	0	1	0	2	0	30	0
Sydney FC	2020–21	A-League	25	0	—		—		25	0
Sydney FC	2021–22	A-League Men	16	0	4	0	6	0	26	0
Sydney FC	2022–23	A-League Men	29	0	3	0	—		32	0
Sydney FC	2023–24	A-League Men	29	0	5	0	—		34	0
Sydney FC	2024–25	A-League Men	8	0	1	0	3	0	12	0
Sydney FC	Total		192	0	24	0	22	0	238	0
Central Coast Mariners	2025–26	A-League Men	26	0	—		—		26	0
Career total			319	0	31	0	22	0	372	0

=== International ===
As of 13 October 2022

Australia
Year	Apps	Goals
2019	1	0
2020	0	0
2021	1	0
2022	2	0
Total	4	0

== Honours ==
Brisbane Roar

- A-League Men Premiership: 2010–11
- A-League Men Championship: 2010–11, 2011–12

Sydney FC

- A-League Men Premiership: 2016–17, 2017–18, 2019–20
- A-League Men Championship: 2016–17, 2018–19, 2019–20
- Australia Cup: 2017, 2023

Australia U20

- AFF U-19 Youth Championship: 2008

Individual

- PFA A-League Team of the Year: 2017–18
- A-League Goalkeeper of the Year: 2019–20, 2020–21
- A-Leagues All Star: 2022
