= William Kennedy (priest) =

William GeorgeKennedy was an Anglican priest in Ireland during the late 19th century and the first part of the 20th.

Kennedy was educated at Trinity College Dublin. He was ordained deacon and priest in 1869. He began his career with a curacy at Killymard. He held incumbencies at Lough Eske, Laghy and Raymochy. He was appointed private chaplain to the bishop of Derry in 1916 and dean of Raphoe in 1917. He was rural dean of Raphoe from 1877 to 1905; an Honorary Canon at Raphoe Cathedral from 1898 to 1905; and dean of Raphoe from 1905 until 1917.
