= Diesel Herrington =

Australian association football player

Personal information
- Full name: Diesel Jay Herrington
- Date of birth: 4 August 2004 (age 22)
- Place of birth: Brisbane, Queensland, Australia
- Height: 1.88 m (6 ft 2 in)
- Position: Central defender

Team information
- Current team: Central Coast Mariners
- Number: 3

Youth career
- 2015–2017: Brisbane City
- 2017–2022: Brisbane Roar
- 2022–2024: AGF

Senior career*
Years	Team	Apps	(Gls)
2022–2024	AGF	0	(0)
2024–	Central Coast Mariners	22	(0)

International career^{‡}
2026–	Australia	2	(0)
- * Club domestic league appearances and goals as of 22 November 2026 ‡ National team caps and goals as of 17 November 2026

Diesel Jay Herrington (born 4 August 2004) is an Australian professional soccer player who plays as a central defender for A-League Men club Central Coast Mariners and the Australia national team.

== Club career ==
=== Youth career ===
Having played junior football at Brisbane City, Herrington joined the Brisbane Roar academy as a 13 year old in 2017, starting in the under-14s age group. Herrington progressed through the age groups at Brisbane Roar, eventually playing for their NPL Queensland first grade team, before joining Aarhus Gymnastikforening (AGF) in the Danish Superliga. Herrington started in the under-19s team and was selected on the bench for AGF's senior team several times, however never made an appearance.

=== Central Coast Mariners ===
Herrington returned to Australia to join the Central Coast Mariners ahead of the 2024-25 A-League season. Herrington made his debut for the club in an Australia Cup tie against Heidelberg United, coming off the bench. Herrington made his first start for the club on 5 November 2024, in a home AFC Champions League Elite fixture against Shanghai Shenhua.

Herrington signed a two-year contract extension with the Mariners in June 2026.

== International career ==
Herrington was called up to the Australian national team for the first time in November 2026 for friendly internationals against Qatar and Jordan, alongside his brother Lucas. He made his international debut in a 3–0 win over Qatar on 13 November 2026, coming on as a substitute for his brother Lucas in the second half.

== Personal life ==
Herrington's younger brother, Lucas, currently plays as a central defender for Hull City A.F.C and Australia. Herrington is of German-Finnish-Zimbabwean descent, and would be eligible to represent either Australia, Zimbabwe, Finland, or Germany in international football.

== Career statistics ==
=== Club ===
As of 16 November 2026

Appearances and goals by club, season and competition
Club	Season	League			National cup (Note: Includes Australia Cup)		Continental		Total	
Club	Season	Division	Apps	Goals	Apps	Goals	Apps	Goals	Apps	Goals
AGF	2022–23	Danish Superliga	0	0	0	0	—		0	0
AGF	2023–24	Danish Superliga	0	0	0	0	0	0	0	0
AGF	Total		0	0	0	0	0	0	0	0
Central Coast Mariners	2024–25	A-League Men	11	0	2	0	3 (Note: Appearances in the AFC Champions League Elite)	0	16	0
Central Coast Mariners	2025–26	A-League Men	6	0	—		—		6	0
Central Coast Mariners	2026–27	A-League Men	4	0	0	0	—		4	0
Central Coast Mariners	Total		21	0	2	0	3	0	26	0
Career total			21	0	2	0	3	0	26	0

=== International ===
As of match played 17 November 2026

Appearances and goals by national team and year
National team	Year	Apps	Goals
Australia	2026	2	0
Total		2	0

== See also ==
- List of association football families
- List of Central Coast Mariners FC players
