= Arthur De Lima =

Australian association football player

Personal information
- Full name: Arthur Oliveira De Lima
- Date of birth: 11 June 2007 (age 19)
- Place of birth: Brisbane, Australia
- Height: 1.82 m (5 ft 11 1/2 in)
- Position: Striker

Team information
- Current team: Central Coast Mariners
- Number: 22

Youth career
- –2021: Moreton Bay United
- 2021–2023: Brisbane Roar
- 2024–2025: Central Coast Mariners

Senior career*
Years	Team	Apps	(Gls)
2023	Brisbane Roar NPL	7	(0)
2024–	CCM Academy	25	(13)
2024–	Central Coast Mariners	26	(3)

International career^{‡}
2025–	Australia U18	0	(0)
2025–	Australia U20	7	(0)
- * Club domestic league appearances and goals as of 14 November 2026 ‡ National team caps and goals as of 1 September 2026

Arthur Oliveira De Lima (Brazilian Portuguese: [o.liˈvej.ɾɐ dʒi ˈli.mɐ]; born 11 June 2007) is an Australian professional footballer who plays as a striker for the Central Coast Mariners.

== Club career ==
=== Youth career ===
Having played junior football at Moreton Bay United, De Lima joined the Brisbane Roar academy in 2021, starting in the under-14s age group. Despite his young age during his time at the Roar, he made appearances for the Roar's NPL first grade team, before moving to the Central Coast Mariners Academy for the 2024 season.

=== Central Coast Mariners ===
De Lima started his time at the Mariners playing mostly in the Under-20s team, before breaking through into the NPL first grade team in the back half of that 2024 season. De Lima ended up making 15 appearances for the NPL first grade team that season, and scored 8 goals in helping the team avoid relegation, including a hat trick at home against Wollongong Wolves to come from 2-0 down to win 3-2. De Lima's form saw him rewarded with a 3 year scholarship contract with the club to join their senior squad ahead of the 2024-25 A-League season, still only at the age of 17.

De Lima made his debut for the Mariners' senior team in the AFC Champions League Elite, coming off the bench in the 83rd minute against Chinese club Shandong Taishan on 17 September 2024. De Lima made his A-League debut against his former youth club, Brisbane Roar, scoring 8 minutes after being substituted onto the pitch and running over to his family in the stands to celebrate with a hug.

== Youth international career ==
He was called up in May 2025 for the Australia men's national under-18 soccer team, to take part in the 2025 UEFA Friendship Cup commencing in early June.
