= William John Kennedy (photographer) =

American photographer

- Born: 1930; Glen Cove, New York, United States
- Died: December 16, 2021; Miami, United States
- Education: Syracuse University
- Occupation: Photographer
- Works: Before they were famous

William John Kennedy (1930 – December 16, 2021) was an American photographer. He was best known for his work Before they were famous and other works much of which is inspired by his real life friendship with American artists Robert Indiana and Andy Warhol, both who were associated with the pop art movement. His photograph of Andy Warhol holding up the acetate of Marilyn Monroe is on permanent display in the lobby of the Andy Warhol Museum in Pittsburgh, Pennsylvania.

== Early life and education ==
Kennedy received his education from Syracuse University where he majored in fine art. During his early years, he worked as an assistant and studio manager for American fashion photographer Clifford Coffin.

== Career ==
Kennedy was a freelance photographer who formed a friendship with then unknown artists Andy Warhol and Robert Indiana. He used to take photographs of Warhol and his entourage as well as Indiana for his own personal practice. Years later, Kennedy rediscovered the negatives. An exhibition entitled Before they were famous was constructed around these newly discovered negatives and transparencies and was featured at exhibitions in London, New York City as well as the Andy Warhol Museum in Pittsburgh, Pennsylvania.

Kennedy's life, work as well as his friendship with Andy Warhol and Robert Indiana was the subject of a documentary, Full Circle. His friendship with Warhol and Indiana is also featured in another documentary film titled Andy Warhol: A documentary.

== Personal life ==
Kennedy was married. He was a native of Garden City, Long Island but later moved to Miami Beach, Florida.
