= Bill Kennedy (footballer, born 1875) =

Australian rules footballer

Personal information
- Full name: William Patrick Kennedy
- Born: 3 August 1875; Richmond, Victoria
- Died: 28 December 1939 (aged 64); Melbourne, Victoria
- Original team: Fitzroy Juniors
- Height: 180 cm (5 ft 11 in)
- Weight: 81 kg (179 lb)

Playing career^{1}
Years	Club	Games (Goals)
1898–99	Collingwood	19 (1)
- ^{1} Playing statistics correct to the end of 1899.

William Patrick Kennedy (3 August 1875 – 28 December 1939) was an Australian rules footballer who played with Collingwood in the Victorian Football League (VFL).
