= Bill Kennedy (basketball) =

American basketball player

Personal information
- Born: May 17, 1938 Philadelphia, Pennsylvania, U.S.
- Died: August 31, 2006 (aged 68) West Palm Beach, Florida, U.S.
- Listed height: 5 ft 11 in (1.80 m)
- Listed weight: 180 lb (82 kg)

Career information
- High school: Abraham Lincoln (Philadelphia, Pennsylvania)
- College: Temple (1957–1960)
- NBA draft: 1960: 2nd round, 15th overall pick
- Drafted by: Philadelphia Warriors
- Position: Guard
- Number: 34

Career history

Playing
- 1960–1961: Philadelphia Warriors

Coaching
- 1968–1969: Allentown Jets

Career highlights
- Second-team All-American – NEA, SN (1960); Third-team All-American – AP (1960); Robert V. Geasey Trophy winner (1960)
- Stats at NBA.com
- Stats at Basketball Reference

William R. "Pickles" Kennedy (May 17, 1938 – August 31, 2006) was an American professional basketball player. He was a 5-foot-11-inch (180 cm), 180-pound (82 kg) guard and played collegiately at Temple University. He played briefly in the National Basketball Association (NBA).

== Career ==
Kennedy was selected by the Philadelphia Warriors with the 15th pick in the 2nd round of the 1960 NBA draft. He played seven games for the Warriors in the 1960–1961 season, averaging 1.7 points, 1.1 rebounds and 1.3 assists per game.

Kennedy was the head coach for the Allentown Jets of the Eastern Professional Basketball League (EPBL) during the 1968–69 season.

== Personal life ==
He died in 2006 in a car accident in Florida.

== Career statistics ==
=== NBA ===
Legend
GP	Games played	GS	Games started	MPG	Minutes per game
FG%	Field goal percentage	3P%	3-point field goal percentage	FT%	Free throw percentage
RPG	Rebounds per game	APG	Assists per game	SPG	Steals per game
BPG	Blocks per game	PPG	Points per game	**Bold**	Career high

==== Regular season ====
Year	Team	GP	MPG	FG%	FT%	RPG	APG	PPG
1960–61	Philadelphia	7	7.4	.190	.667	1.1	1.3	1.7
