= Bill Kennedy (American football) =

American football player (1919–1998)

Profile
- Positions: Guard, fullback

Personal information
- Born: March 13, 1919; Lee, Massachusetts, U.S.
- Died: December 29, 1998 (age 79); Southfield, Michigan, U.S.
- Listed height: 5 ft 11 in (1.80 m)
- Listed weight: 200 lb (91 kg)

Career information
- High school: Northwestern (Detroit, MI)
- College: Michigan State University

Career history
- Detroit Lions (1942); El Toro Marines (1944–1945); Boston Yanks (1947)
- Stats at Pro Football Reference

William James "Wild Bill" Kennedy (March 13, 1919 – December 29, 1998) was an American football player.

A native of Lee, Massachusetts, he moved with his family to Detroit at age eight. He played college football for Michigan State College (later known as Michigan State University) from 1939 to 1941. He played at the fullback position until his senior year, when he was moved to the line.

Kennedy also played professional football in the National Football League as a guard for the Detroit Lions in 1942 and the Boston Yanks in 1947.

His football career was interrupted by military service during World War II, and he played for the El Toro Marines in 1944 and 1945. In 1946, he was an assistant football coach at the University of San Francisco.
