= Bill Kennedy (New Zealand footballer) =

New Zealand footballer

Personal information
- Full name: William Kennedy
- Place of birth: New Zealand
- Position: Right-half

Senior career*
| Years | Team | Apps | (Gls) |
- Saint Kilda

International career
| 1967 | New Zealand | 1 | (0) |
- * Club domestic league appearances and goals

William Kennedy is a former association football player who represented New Zealand at international level.

Kennedy made a solitary official international appearance for New Zealand in a 0–4 loss to New Caledonia on 8 November 1967.
