= Bailey Brandtman =

Australian association footballer

Personal information
- Full name: Bailey Anthony Brandtman
- Date of birth: 28 June 2005 (age 21)
- Place of birth: Sydney, New South Wales, Australia
- Height: 1.88 m (6 ft 2 in)
- Position: Attacking midfielder

Team information
- Current team: Central Coast Mariners
- Number: 37

Youth career
- 2017–2021: Moreton Bay United
- 2021–: Central Coast Mariners

Senior career*
Years	Team	Apps	(Gls)
2023–2025	CCM Academy	40	(6)
2023–	Central Coast Mariners	46	(4)

International career^{‡}
2023–	Australia U20	4	(2)
- * Club domestic league appearances and goals as of 22 November 2026 ‡ National team caps and goals as of 11 June 2024

Bailey Brandtman (German: [bʁantman]; born 28 June 2005) is an Australian professional footballer who plays as an attacking midfielder for Central Coast Mariners.

== Club career ==
Brandtman begun his football career playing his youth football in the youth teams of National Premier Leagues Queensland club Moreton Bay United.

=== Central Coast Mariners ===
In 2021, Brandtman was scouted and signed by the Central Coast Mariners to join their academy set up. Brandtman played mostly for the Mariners U20s team in his first few seasons at the club, including playing in the 2022 NSW League One U20s Grand Final. Brandtman broke through into the NPL first grade side at the back-end of the 2023 NPL season, and is considered one of the leading players for the team for the 2024 season.

Brandtman received a scholarship contract from the club to be part of their first team squad for the 2023-24 A-League season. Brandtman made his A-League debut on 27 January 2024, in a home victory over Brisbane Roar. Brandtman was part of the Mariners' 2023-24 premiership and championship and 2023–24 AFC Cup winning season, being part of a treble-winning season in his first season in professional football. On 5 November 2024, Brandtman scored his first senior goal for the club in the 2024–25 AFC Champions League Elite, a late equaliser in a 2–2 draw against Chinese club Shanghai Shenhua at home. He scored his second goal for the club on 26 November in a 3–2 lost against Japanese club Vissel Kobe.

== International career ==
Brandtman was named in Australia's U20 squad for the 2023 Marbella Week of Football Tournament in Spain, scoring twice in Australia's three games as they went through the tournament undefeated.

== Honours ==
Central Coast Mariners

- A-League Men Championship: 2023-24
- A-League Men Premiership: 2023-24
- AFC Cup: 2023-24
