= Sabit Ngor =

Kenyan footballer (born 2001)

Sabit James Ngor
Personal information
- Full name: Sabit James Ngor
- Date of birth: 5 January 2001 (age 25)
- Place of birth: Kakuma, Kenya
- Height: 1.87 m (6 ft 2 in)
- Position: Winger

Team information
- Current team: Brisbane Roar
- Number: 19

Youth career
- 2016–2020: Werribee City
- 2020: Port Melbourne
- 2021–2023: Western United

Senior career*
Years	Team	Apps	(Gls)
2021–2023	Western United NPL	31	(12)
2023	Heidelberg United	0	(0)
2023	Ilves	20	(2)
2024	Heidelberg United	8	(5)
2024–2026	Central Coast Mariners	34	(7)
2025	→ Heidelberg United (loan)	28	(6)
2026–	Brisbane Roar	0	(0)
- * Club domestic league appearances and goals as of 19 April 2026

Sabit James Ngor (Swahili: [saˈbit ŋoɾ]; born 5 January 2001) is a Kenyan professional footballer who plays as a winger for A-League Men club Brisbane Roar.

== Career ==
He made his professional debut on 7 December 2021 in a FFA Cup match for Western United against A-League Men side Wellington Phoenix.

For the 2023 season, Ngor signed with Ilves in Finnish top-tier Veikkausliiga. He left the club after the season when his contract expired. Ngor played 20 league matches for Ilves scoring two goals. He also scored two goals in six cup matches, helping his team to win the 2023 Finnish Cup title.

== Career statistics ==
As of 12 February 2025

Appearances and goals by club, season and competition
Club	Season	League			Cup (Note: Includes Suomen Cup and Australia Cup)		League cup		Continental		Total	
Club	Season	Division	Apps	Goals	Apps	Goals	Apps	Goals	Apps	Goals	Apps	Goals
Heidelberg United	2023	NPL Victoria	0	0	0	0	–		–		0	0
Ilves	2023	Veikkausliiga	20	2	7	2	2 (Note: Includes Finnish League Cup)	1	–		29	5
Heidelberg United	2024	NPL Victoria	8	5	2	0	1	0	–		11	5
Central Coast Mariners	2024–25	A-League	9	1	0	0	–		6 (Note: Appearances in AFC Champions League Two)	1	15	2
Central Coast Mariners	2025–26	A-League	25	6	0	0	–		–		25	6
Central Coast Mariners	Mariners Total		34	7	0	0	0	0	6	1	40	8
Heidelberg United (loan)	2025	NPL Victoria	27	6	4	0	6	3	–		37	9
Brisbane Roar	2026–27	A-League	0	0	2	1	–		–		2	1
Career total			89	20	15	3	9	4	6	1	119	28

== Honours ==
Ilves

- Finnish Cup: 2023
