= Miguel Di Pizio =

Australian soccer player (born 2006)

Personal information
- Date of birth: 4 January 2006 (age 20)
- Place of birth: Sydney, Australia
- Height: 1.75 m (5 ft 9 in)
- Position: Attacking midfielder

Team information
- Current team: Western Sydney Wanderers
- Number: 10

Youth career
- AC United FC
- 2019–2022: Western Sydney Wanderers

Senior career*
Years	Team	Apps	(Gls)
2022	Western Sydney Wanderers NPL	8	(1)
2023	Central Coast Mariners NPL	14	(3)
2023–2026	Central Coast Mariners	51	(5)
2026–	Western Sydney Wanderers	0	(0)

International career^{‡}
2022–2023	Australia U17	10	(5)
2024–2025	Australia U20	5	(0)
- * Club domestic league appearances and goals as of 3 May 2026 ‡ National team caps and goals as of 28 September 2024

Miguel Di Pizio (Italian: [di ˈpittsjo]; born 4 January 2006) is an Australian professional soccer player who plays as an attacking midfielder for A-League Men club Western Sydney Wanderers.

== Early life ==
Born in Sydney, New South Wales, Di Pizio started playing football at the age of four. He attended Mamre Anglican School, located in Kemps Creek, and Westfields Sports High School, representing in both schools' football teams. He has an older brother, Gianni Di Pizio, who also played in the youth teams at Western Sydney Wanderers and Central Coast Mariners. In addition to being Australian, Di Pizio is of Italian and Mauritius descent.

== Club career ==
=== Central Coast Mariners ===
A youth academy player of Western Sydney Wanderers, Di Pizio signed a scholarship contract (his first professional contract) with Central Coast Mariners under head coach Nick Montgomery on 12 April 2023. Di Pizio made his professional debut as an 85th-minute substitute on 22 April 2023 in a 3–1 league win against F3 rivals Newcastle Jets. He was added to the Mariners' 2023 A-League Grand Final squad, but was not named on the match squad on the day.

On 29 November 2023, Di Pizio scored his first professional goal in the 2023–24 AFC Cup in a 1–1 home draw to Terengganu. Di Pizio made his starting debut for the Mariners on 8 December 2023 in a 4–0 victory over Western United at Central Coast Stadium. Di Pizio was part of the Mariners' treble winning season, achieving the both league titles, and the AFC Cup. In the 2024 A-League Grand Final, Di Pizio became the youngest ever goalscorer in an A-League Grand Final after scoring in a 3–1 victory over Melbourne Victory at Central Coast Stadium. He extended with the Mariners on a two-year contract in July 2024.

=== Western Sydney Wanderers ===
He scored his first goal for western sydney in a 5-2 win versus auckland fc on Saturday 24th of October 2026.

== International career ==
In July 2022, Di Pizio received his first international call-up to represent the Australian under-17 team ahead of the 2022 AFF U-16 Youth Championship, and was renamed in a 23-man squad for the 2023 AFC U-17 Asian Cup qualifiers. He helped Australia to automatic qualification for the U-17 Asian Cup, scoring the third goal in a 3–1 win over China to top the group. During the tournament, Di Pizio also managed to score a brace in a 23–0 victory against Northern Mariana Islands, and a goal in a 10–0 win over Cambodia.

In May 2023, Di Pizio was renamed in the 23-man squad for the U-17 Asian Cup that was staged in Bangkok and Chonburi. Di Pizio featured in all three group matches as Australia qualified to the knockout rounds. He was also awarded player of the match in a 2–0 win against Tajikistan in the Joey's last group match. Di Pizio also featured in Australia's 3–1 quarter-final loss to Japan at BG Stadium.

== Honours ==
Central Coast Mariners

- A-League Men Championship: 2023–24
- A-League Men Premiership: 2023–24
- AFC Cup: 2023–24

Western Sydney Wanderers U20

- National Premier Leagues NSW Under-20 Champions: 2022
