= Ali Auglah =

Australian soccer player

- Auglah with Sydney Olympic in 2025

Personal information
- Full name: Ali Auglah Al-Mousawi
- Date of birth: 11 March 2002 (age 24)
- Place of birth: Auburn, New South Wales, Australia
- Height: 1.75 m (5 ft 9 in)
- Position: Winger

Team information
- Current team: Central Coast Mariners
- Number: 72

Youth career
- 2014–2016: Marconi Stallions
- 2016–2019: Western Sydney Wanderers

Senior career*
Years	Team	Apps	(Gls)
2019–2021	Western Sydney Wanderers NPL	37	(18)
2020–2021	Western Sydney Wanderers	1	(0)
2022–2024	Macarthur FC	25	(4)
2021–2022	Northbridge FC	10	(1)
2024–2025	Al-Naft	0	(0)
2025	Rockdale Ilinden	26	(13)
2025	Sydney Olympic	6	(6)
2026–	Central Coast Mariners	19	(6)

International career^{‡}
2019–2021	Australia U17	3	(1)
- * Club domestic league appearances and goals as of 22 November 2026 ‡ National team caps and goals as of 11 January 2020

Ali Auglah Al-Mousawi (born 11 March 2002) is a professional soccer player who plays as a winger for the A-League Men club Central Coast Mariners. Born in Australia and a former representative of the Australia under-17 national team, he has committed to play for the Iraq national team.

== Early life ==
Auglah was born on 11 March 2002 at Auburn Hospital in the western suburb of Sydney, New South Wales to Iraqi parents, who came to Australia as refugees in 1998. Auglah was raised in Granville and began playing football at the age of five with his two older brothers. He joined National Premier Leagues (NPL) club Marconi in their under-12s before signing for Western Sydney Wanderers in 2016 after impressing Wanderers' head of youth Ian Crook in his under-13s Grand Final.

== Club career ==
After signing for the Wanderers in late-2016, Auglah was one of eight players to receive financial support by the Wanderers, which covered registration fees, scholarship plaques and professional media training. He was registered in the senior National Premier Leagues and A-League Youth squad in 2019.

Auglah was also called into the first-team squad under Carl Robinson, and made his professional debut on 11 January 2020 in a 2–0 away defeat to Wellington Phoenix. He departed the club in 2022, moving to Iraq for a career break from football.

On 12 December 2022, Auglah was announced to have signed with Bulls FC Academy, the reserve side of Macarthur FC. He made his club debut at Campbelltown Sports Stadium on 28 January 2023 in a 2–2 league draw with Western United. Subsequently, he signed his first professional contract on 17 March 2023, committing to a two-year deal with Macarthur.

On 22 September 2023, Auglah scored his first professional goal in the 2023–24 AFC Cup, netting the third goal of a 3–0 opening group match victory over Shan United. After accumulating 442 minutes in the A-League by 4 November, Auglah scored his first league goal, the winning goal in the 93rd-minute of a 1–0 win against Western United.

Auglah scored his third goal of the season in the 93rd minute of a 3–0 victory over Cebu in the final group match of the AFC Cup on 14 December. Macarthur FC finished top of the group, allowing them to advance to the knockout round in February 2024.

In 2024, Auglah signed for Iraq Stars League club Al-Naft.

== International career ==
Born in Auburn, New South Wales, Auglah represented the Australian national under-17 team in the 2019 FIFA U-17 World Cup.
