= Nathanael Blair =

Australian footballer (born 2004)

Personal information
- Full name: Nathanael Dane Blair
- Date of birth: 15 March 2004 (age 22)
- Place of birth: Camperdown, New South Wales, Australia
- Position: Striker

Team information
- Current team: Veres Rivne
- Number: 9

Youth career
- Marrickville FC
- 2017–2020: APIA Leichhardt
- 2021: Northbridge FC

Senior career*
Years	Team	Apps	(Gls)
2022	APIA Leichhardt	13	(1)
2022–2024	Western Sydney Wanderers NPL	38	(19)
2022–2024	Western Sydney Wanderers	7	(0)
2024–2026	Perth Glory	16	(0)
2026	Central Coast Mariners	13	(3)
2026–	Veres Rivne	0	(0)

International career^{‡}
2025–	Australia U23	8	(5)
- * Club domestic league appearances and goals as of 3 May 2026 ‡ National team caps and goals as of 21 January 2026

Nathanael Dane Blair (born 15 March 2004) is an Australian footballer who plays as a striker for Ukrainian Premier League club Veres Rivne.

== Career ==
=== APIA Leichhardt ===
Aged 13, Blair joined APIA in 2017, during his years in the youth teams he played for multiple age groups for the club before joining Northbridge FC in 2021. On 3 March 2022, Blair rejoined APIA for the 2022 NPL NSW season. On 11 March 2022, Blair scored on his senior club debut in a 1–0 win against Manly United.

=== Western Sydney Wanderers ===
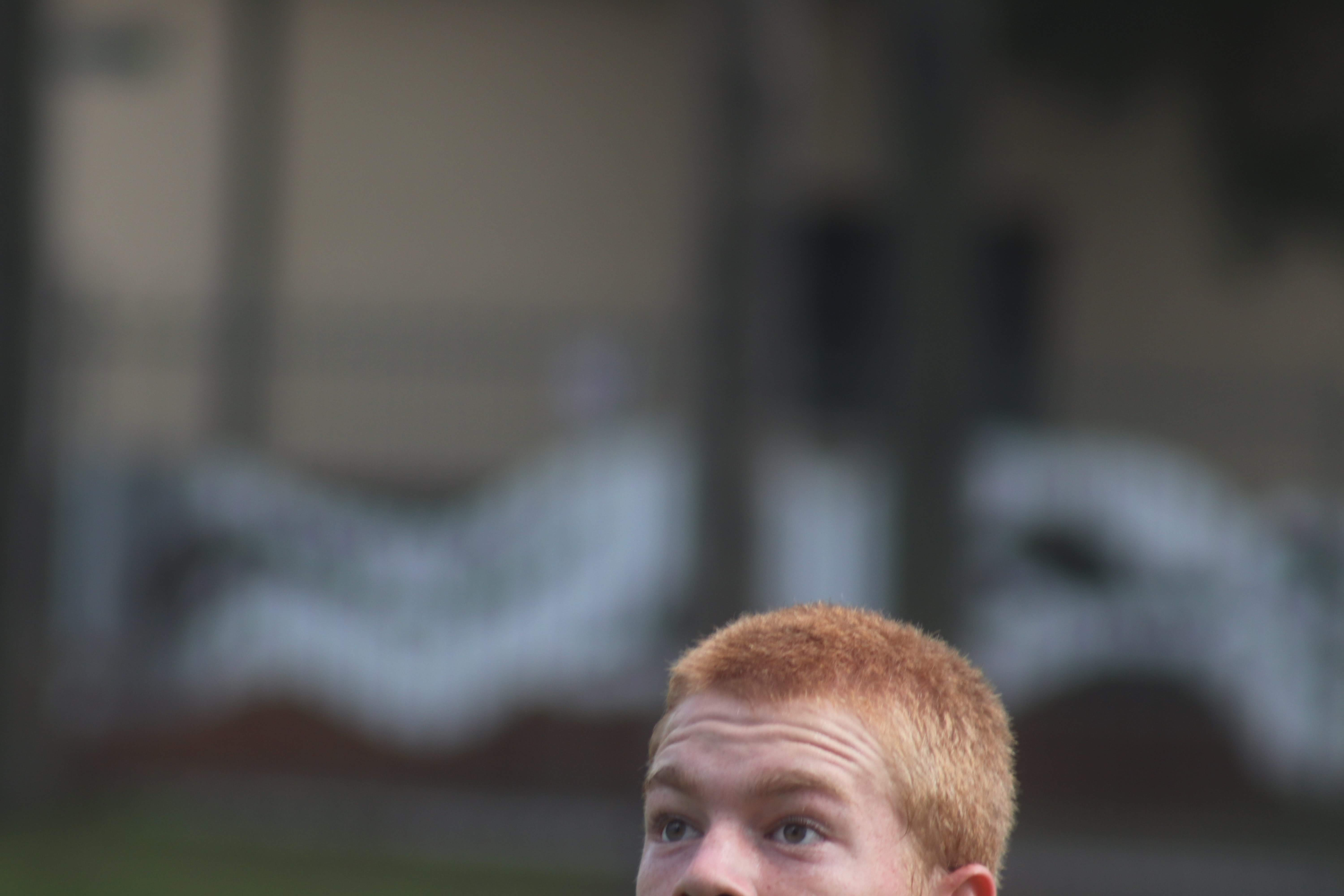
Nathanael Blair Jumping Up for a Header

On 22 June 2022, Blair signed a two-year scholarship deal with the Western Sydney Wanderers. He was named on the bench against Melbourne Victory, two months prior to making his league debut in a 1–1 draw against Wellington Phoenix on 10 December 2022.

=== Perth Glory ===
On 12 June 2024, Perth revealed the signing of Blair on a two-year deal.

He made his competitive debut for the club in the Australia Cup play-off match against Brisbane Roar, scoring as a substitute in a 2–4 win which meant Perth qualified for the competition proper.

On 6 January 2026, Blair had his contract with Perth Glory terminated by mutual consent, to pursue another opportunity.

=== Central Coast Mariners ===
Following his release from Perth Glory, Blair joined the Central Coast Mariners.

=== Veres Rivne ===
After departing Central Coast Mariners, Blair joined Ukrainian club Veres Rivne.
