= Nicholas Duarte =

Australian association football player

Personal information
- Full name: Nicholas Recoba Duarte
- Date of birth: 16 December 2003 (age 22)
- Place of birth: Sydney, New South Wales, Australia
- Height: 1.77 m (5 ft 9 1/2 in)
- Position: Striker

Team information
- Current team: Wollongong Wolves

Youth career
- –2022: Wollongong Wolves
- 2023–2024: Central Coast Mariners

Senior career*
Years	Team	Apps	(Gls)
2021–2022	Wollongong Wolves	19	(1)
2023–2024	CCM Academy	34	(6)
2023–	Central Coast Mariners	23	(2)
2026	→ Heidelberg United (loan)	19	(4)
2026–	→ Wollongong Wolves (loan)	0	(0)
- * Club domestic league appearances and goals as of 20 September 2026

Nicholas Recoba Duarte (Latin American Spanish: [reˈkoβa ˈdwaɾte]; born 16 December 2003) is an Australian professional footballer who plays as a striker for Wollongong Wolves in the Australian Championship, on loan from A-League Men club Central Coast Mariners.

== Career ==
=== Wollongong Wolves ===
Duarte begun his senior career at Wollongong Wolves in the National Premier Leagues NSW (NPL NSW) competition, breaking into their first grade team in the 2021 season. Duarte made 19 league appearances for Wollongong, scoring his first senior goal in a 3-0 home win over Mount Druitt Town Rangers in April 2022. Duarte also came off the bench against future club, Central Coast Mariners, in an FFA Cup tie.

=== Central Coast Mariners ===
Duarte moved to the Central Coast Mariners to join their youth set up for the 2023 season. However, Duarte found himself immediately in calculations for the senior team, making his A-League debut against the Western Sydney Wanderers on 4 March 2023 at Western Sydney Stadium. Duarte also appeared off the bench the following week against Macarthur FC at Glen Willow Regional Sports Stadium, before spending the rest of the season playing for the Mariners' youth team in the NPL NSW.

Duarte received a scholarship contract to be part of the Mariners' senior squad for the 2023-24 season. Duarte had an injury interrupted season, only making 2 appearances for the senior team, however he returned mid-way through the 2024 NPL season, where he finished the season with 6 goals, including two goals in the second-leg to help overturn a first-leg deficit in a promotion/relegation play-off against Bulls FC Academy.

Duarte scored his first senior goal for the Mariners in an AFC Champions League Elite match against Shanghai Port on 23 October 2024. Having broken through to become a regular member of the senior team for the 2024-25 season, in November he suffered a broken ankle at training, which sidelined him for four months. Duarte made his return in early March, scoring his first ever A-League goal a couple of weeks later against Auckland FC.

== Honours ==
Central Coast Mariners

- A-League Men Championship: 2022–23, 2023–24
- A-League Men Premiership: 2023–24
- AFC Cup: 2023–24
