= Alfie McCalmont =

Northern Irish footballer (born 2000)

Personal information
- Full name: Alfie McCalmont
- Date of birth: 25 March 2000 (age 26)
- Place of birth: Thirsk, England
- Height: 1.75 m (5 ft 9 in)
- Position: Defensive midfielder

Team information
- Current team: Gateshead
- Number: 25

Youth career
- –2018: Leeds United

Senior career*
Years	Team	Apps	(Gls)
2018–2023	Leeds United	0	(0)
2020–2021	→ Oldham Athletic (loan)	32	(8)
2021–2022	→ Morecambe (loan)	26	(1)
2023	→ Carlisle United (loan)	16	(2)
2023–2024	Carlisle United	50	(4)
2024–2026	Central Coast Mariners	40	(5)
2026–	Gateshead	1	(0)

International career
2016	Northern Ireland U17	2	(0)
2017–2018	Northern Ireland U19	5	(1)
2019–	Northern Ireland U21	10	(1)
2019–	Northern Ireland	4	(0)
- * Club domestic league appearances and goals as of 30 September 2026

Alfie McCalmont (born 25 March 2000) is a professional footballer who plays as a defensive midfielder. McCalmont is currently a free agent, having most recently played for Central Coast Mariners. McCalmont has also represented the Northern Ireland national team.

== Career ==
Born in Thirsk, he attended Thirsk School and Sixth Form College and came through the youth academy at Leeds United. He signed a professional contract extension on 22 January 2019 keeping him at the club until the summer of 2021. During the 2018–19 season, he featured regularly for Carlos Corberán's Leeds United under 23s side that won the PDL Northern League 2018–19 league title; they then became the national Professional Development League Champions by beating Birmingham City in the final.

McCalmont started the first pre-season friendly of the 2019–20 season against York City in a 5–0 win on 10 July, and was named in the 1st team travelling squad on 4 August in Leeds' opening day 3–1 EFL Championship victory against Bristol City; he was left out of the final 18, but was allocated the 38 shirt for the season.

He was given his first team debut by head coach Marcelo Bielsa on 13 August in the EFL Cup against Salford City, coming on as a substitute for Jack Clarke in the 70th minute.

He made his first Leeds start on 27 August 2019 in Leeds' EFL Cup match against Stoke City, with Leeds losing 4–5 on penalties after a 2–2 draw.

After the English professional football season was paused in March 2020 due to the COVID-19 pandemic, the season was resumed during June, where McCalmont was part of the squad who earned promotion with Leeds to the Premier League and also become the EFL Championship Champions for the 2019–20 season in July after the successful resumption of the season. Despite not playing a League game he qualified for a league medal due to being named in enough matchday squads.

In August 2020, McCalmont signed a new four-year contract with Leeds United. He was named on the bench by Marcelo Bielsa on 16 September 2020 as an unused substitute for Premier League Leeds in a 1–1 draw against Hull City in the EFL Cup.

=== Loan spells ===
He joined Oldham Athletic on a season-long loan on 25 September 2020. He scored his first goals for Oldham, and his first professional goals, when he scored twice on 10 November 2020 in an EFL Trophy group game against Bradford City. In July 2021, McCalmont joined Morecambe on loan for the 2021–22 season. On 9 January 2023, McCalmont joined Carlisle United on a loan until the end of the season, and permanently joined Carlisle on 27 June 2023 for an undisclosed fee.

=== Central Coast Mariners ===
On 12 July 2024, McCalmont joined A-League Men club Central Coast Mariners, managed by former Leeds Academy coaches Mark Jackson and Danny Schofield, as well as former Carlisle teammate Ryan Edmondson. McCalmont made his debut for the club on 7 August 2024, in a 2024 Australia Cup round of 32 tie against Heidelberg United.

McCalmont scored his first goal for the club on 28 December 2024, at home against Auckland FC.

After two seasons, McCalmont departed the Mariners at the end of the 2025-26 season, following a change of ownership for the club.

=== Gateshead ===
In September 2026, McCalmont returned to England, joining National League club Gateshead on a deal until the end of the season.

== International career ==
He has represented Northern Ireland at international level up to U21s. He was called up to the senior Northern Ireland squad in 2019 for a summer training camp.

He made his senior debut for Northern Ireland on 5 September 2019 coming on for George Saville as a 60th-minute substitute in a 1–0 win against Luxembourg.

He was recalled to the Northern Irish national team for matches against Malta and Ukraine in June 2021 after impressing with Oldham Athletic with 8 goals and 5 assists in League 2.

McCalmont made his competitive senior international debut on 2 September 2021 coming on for Jordan Thompson as an 82nd-minute substitute in a 1–4 win against Lithuania in FIFA World Cup European Qualifying.

== Style of play ==
McCalmont plays as a deep lying central midfielder. He plays mainly as a playmaking defensive midfielder, known for his passing and ability on the ball, dictating the play.

Belfast Live said McCalmont has "excellent technique, is tenacious in the tackle and has an eye for a pass".

== Career statistics ==
=== Club ===
As of match played 20 April 2024

Appearances and goals by club, season and competition
Club	Season	League			National cup		League cup		Other		Total	
Club	Season	Division	Apps	Goals	Apps	Goals	Apps	Goals	Apps	Goals	Apps	Goals
Leeds United	2019–20	Championship	0	0	0	0	2	0	0	0	2	0
Leeds United	2020–21	Premier League	0	0	0	0	0	0	0	0	0	0
Leeds United	2021–22	Premier League	0	0	0	0	0	0	0	0	0	0
Leeds United	2022–23	Premier League	0	0	0	0	0	0	0	0	0	0
Leeds United U21	2022–23	—			—		—		2 (Note: Appearances in EFL Trophy)	0	2	0
Oldham Athletic (loan)	2020–21	League Two	32	8	3	0	0	0	1	2	36	10
Morecambe (loan)	2021–22	League One	26	1	3	0	1	0	1	0	31	1
Carlisle United (loan)	2022–23	League Two	16	2	0	0	0	0	3 (Note: Appearances in the play-offs)	0	19	2
Carlisle United	2023–24	League One	30	2	0	0	1	0	3	0	34	2
Central Coast Mariners	2023–24	A-League Men	0	0	0	0	—		0	0	0	0
Total			104	13	6	0	4	0	10	2	124	15

=== International ===
As of match played 5 September 2021

National team	Year	Apps	Goals
Northern Ireland	2019	1	0
Northern Ireland	2021	3	0
Total		4	0

== Honours ==
Leeds United

- EFL Championship: 2019–20

Carlisle United

- EFL League Two play-offs: 2023
