= Will Kennedy (soccer) =

Australian association football player

Personal information
- Full name: Will Patrick Jardine Kennedy
- Date of birth: 14 February 2005 (age 21)
- Place of birth: Sydney, New South Wales, Australia
- Height: 1.86 m (6 ft 1 in)
- Position: Central midfielder

Team information
- Current team: Newcastle Jets
- Number: 16

Youth career
- –2018: Manly United
- 2018–2025: Sydney FC

Senior career*
Years	Team	Apps	(Gls)
2023–2025	Sydney FC NPL	37	(1)
2024–2025	Sydney FC	2	(0)
2025–2026	Central Coast Mariners	7	(0)
2026–	Newcastle Jets	0	(0)
- * Club domestic league appearances and goals as of 3 July 2026

Will Patrick Jardine Kennedy (born 14 February 2005) is an Australian professional footballer who plays as a midfielder or full back for Newcastle Jets.

== Club career ==
=== Sydney FC ===
In 2018, Kennedy joined Sydney FC's academy at 12 years of age, having previously played early age football at Manly United. Kennedy progressed through the age groups of the academy, moving into the academy's NPL first grade squad for the 2023 season. Kennedy was part of Sydney FC's squad for the 2024-25 AFC Champions League Two, and on 7 November 2024, Kennedy made his debut for Sydney FC's senior team in a match against Sanfrecce Hiroshima. In January 2025, Kennedy signed his first professional contract with Sydney FC, and made two A-League appearances in the second half of the 2024-25 season. Kennedy finished his season by playing for Sydney FC in a highly-publicised friendly against EFL Championship club, Wrexham A.F.C., in front of a crowd of 40,000, where he was afterwards compared to Roy Keane by Sydney FC's youth technical director, Kelly Cross.

=== Central Coast Mariners ===
Kennedy moved to the Central Coast Mariners for the 2025-26 A-League season, joining on a one-year deal. Kennedy only managed 7 league appearances as he battled injuries throughout the season, before being released at the end of the season.

=== Newcastle Jets ===
In July 2026, Kennedy joined Newcastle Jets on a two-year contract.

== Career statistics ==
As of match played 9 July 2026

Appearances and goals by club, season and competition
Club	Season	League			Domestic Cup		Continental		Total	
Club	Season	Division	Apps	Goals	Apps	Goals	Apps	Goals	Apps	Goals
Sydney FC Youth	2023	National Premier Leagues NSW	4	0	0	0	0	0	4	0
Sydney FC Youth	2024	National Premier Leagues NSW	21	0	0	0	0	0	21	0
Sydney FC Youth	2025	National Premier Leagues NSW	12	1	0	0	0	0	12	1
Sydney FC Youth	Sydney FC Youth Total		37	1	0	0	0	0	37	1
Sydney FC	2024–25	A-League	2	0	0	0	4	0	6	0
Central Coast Mariners FC	2025–26	A-League	7	0	0	0	0	0	0	0
Newcastle Jets FC	2026–27	A-League	0	0	0	0	0	0	0	0
Career Total			46	1	0	0	4	0	50	1
