= 2025–26 Adelaide United FC season =

22nd season in the existence of Adelaide United FC

Adelaide United
2025–26 season
- Manager: Airton Andrioli
- Stadium: Coopers Stadium
- A-League Men: 2nd
- A-League Men finals series: Semi-final
- Australia Cup: Round of 32
- Top goalscorer: League: Luka Jovanovic (11); All: Luka Jovanovic (11)
- Highest home attendance: 14,784 vs. Melbourne Victory; 27 December 2025; A-League Men
- Lowest home attendance: 7,343 vs. Macarthur FC; 30 January 2026; A-League Men
- Average home league attendance: 11,073
- Biggest win: 4–0 vs. Perth Glory (H); 20 February 2026; A-League Men
- Biggest defeat: 0–4 vs. Central Coast Mariners (H); 4 January 2026; A-League Men
Home colours	Away colours
- All statistics correct as of 9 May 2026.

The 2025–26 season was the 22nd in the history of Adelaide United Football Club since its establishment in 2003. The club participated in the A-League Men for the 21st consecutive season and made their 11th consecutive appearance in the Australia Cup.

This was Adelaide United's first season since 2019–20 without Carl Veart as the permanent head coach, as he was replaced by Airton Andrioli ahead of pre-season.

== Coaching staff ==
Position	Name	Ref.
Head coach	(Brazil) Airton Andrioli	
Assistant coach	(Spain) Isaías	
Assistant coach	(Australia) Adrian Stenta	
Assistant coach	(Australia) Paul Vanis	
Football Director	(Netherlands) Mitch van Gellekom	
Goalkeeping coach	(Australia) Eugene Galekovic	
Technical director	Vacant	

== Players ==
=== Squad ===
Note: Flags indicate national team as defined under FIFA eligibility rules; some limited exceptions apply. Players may hold more than one non-FIFA nationality.

No.	Pos.	Nation	Player
3	DF	NED	Bart Vriends (vice-captain)
4	DF	AUS	Panagiotis Kikianis
7	DF	AUS	Ryan Kitto
9	FW	AUS	Luka Jovanovic
10	MF	ESP	Juan Muñiz
11	FW	AUS	Craig Goodwin (captain)
12	MF	AUS	Jonny Yull
13	GK	AUS	Max Vartuli
14	MF	AUS	Jay Barnett
15	DF	AUS	Israel Monga (scholarship)
17	FW	AUS	Ben Folami
18	FW	AUS	Jake Najdovski
19	FW	AUS	Yaya Dukuly
20	MF	AUS	Dylan Pierias
22	GK	NED	Joshua Smits
23	MF	AUS	Luke Duzel
35	FW	AUS	Brody Burkitt

No.	Pos.	Nation	Player
36	DF	AUS	Panashe Madanha
40	GK	AUS	Ethan Cox
42	FW	LBN	Austin Ayoubi
44	MF	AUS	Ryan White
52	DF	AUS	Sotiri Phillis (scholarship)
54	DF	AUS	Bailey O'Neil (scholarship)
55	MF	AUS	Ethan Alagich
58	FW	AUS	Harry Crawford
62	MF	AUS	Fabian Talladira (scholarship)
65	MF	AUS	Joey Garuccio (scholarship)
71	DF	AUS	Vinko Stanisic (scholarship)
74	FW	AUS	Amlani Tatu (scholarship)
78	DF	AUS	Malual Nichola (scholarship)
79	DF	AUS	Feyzo Kasumović (scholarship)
87	MF	BRA	Anselmo
99	FW	SSD	Ajak Riak

=== Other players ===
Youth players who featured in a matchday squad, but are uncontracted to the senior team.

Note: Flags indicate national team as defined under FIFA eligibility rules; some limited exceptions apply. Players may hold more than one non-FIFA nationality.

No.	Pos.	Nation	Player
70	GK	AUS	Laris Cesko

== Transfers and contracts ==
=== Transfers in ===
No.	Position	Player	From	Type/fee	Contract length	Date	Ref
11	FW	Craig Goodwin	(Saudi Arabia) Al-Wehda	Free transfer	3 years	28 May 2025	
43	FW	(Netherlands) Julian Kwaaitaal	(Netherlands) FC Eindhoven	End of loan	2 years remaining (Note: Option for an additional year.)	1 July 2025	
22	GK	(Netherlands) Joshua Smits	Unattached	Free transfer	2 years	18 August 2025	
87	MF	(Brazil) Anselmo	Unattached	Free transfer	2 years	5 September 2025	
10	MF	(Spain) Juan Muñiz	Unattached	Free transfer	3 years	15 September 2025	
18	FW	Jake Najdovski	Unattached	Free transfer	3 years	23 September 2025	
15	DF	Israel Monga	(Australia) Goulburn Valley Suns	Free transfer	3 year scholarship	23 September 2025	
99	FW	(South Sudan) Ajak Riak	(Uzbekistan) AGMK	Free transfer	2.5 years	14 January 2026	

==== From youth squad ====
N	Pos.	Nat.	Name	Age	Notes
52	DF	(Australia)	Sotiri Phillis	18	3-year scholarship
65	MF	(Australia)	Joey Garuccio	19	3-year scholarship
71	DF	(Australia)	Vinko Stanisic	18	3-year scholarship
69	FW	(Australia)	Brody Burkitt	19	3-year contract

=== Transfers out ===
No.	Position	Player	Transferred to	Type/fee	Date	Ref
8	MF	(Spain) Isaías	Retired		13 May 2025	
21	DF	(Spain) Javi López	Retired		13 May 2025	
4	DF	Jordan Elsey	(Australia) Campbelltown City	End of contract	27 June 2025	
22	MF	(England) Ryan Tunnicliffe	Unattached	End of contract	30 June 2025	
27	DF	Josh Cavallo	(England) Peterborough Sports	End of contract	30 June 2025	
1	GK	James Delianov	Newcastle Jets	Mutual contract termination	12 July 2025	
10	FW	(England) Zach Clough	(Malaysia) Selangor	Mutual contract termination	16 July 2025	
6	MF	Stefan Mauk	(Vietnam) Cong An Hanoi	Loan	31 July 2025	
26	FW	Archie Goodwin	(United States) Charlotte FC	Undisclosed fee (Note: Reported to be US$2 million, roughly equal to AU$3 million.)	13 August 2025	
43	FW	(Netherlands) Julian Kwaaitaal	Unattached	Mutual contract termination	28 January 2025	

=== Contract extensions ===
No.	Player	Position	Duration	Date	Notes	Ref.
54	Bailey O'Neil	Left-back	1 year	10 October 2025	Scholarship contract.	
3	(Netherlands) Bart Vriends	Centre-Back	1 year	8 January 2026	Contract extended from end of 2025–26 to end of 2026–27.	
23	Luke Duzel	Central midfielder	3 years	5 February 2026	Contract extended from end of 2025–26 to end of 2028–29.	
40	Ethan Cox	Goalkeeper	2 years	31 March 2026	Contract extended from end of 2026–27 to end of 2028–29.	

== Pre-season and friendlies ==
11 July 2025	The Cove (Australia)	0–5	(Australia) Adelaide United	Adelaide
18:30 ACST		Report	Talladira ?', ?'; Jovanovic ?' (pen.), ?'; Phillis ?'	Stadium: Southern Soccer Facility

15 July 2025	Playford City (Australia)	1–7	(Australia) Adelaide United	Adelaide
18:30 ACST	? ?'	Report	Jovanovic ?', ?', ?'; Dukuly ?'; Tatu ?'; Burkitt ?'; Stanisic ?'	Stadium: Ramsay Park

22 July 2025	Adelaide Blue Eagles (Australia)	1–6	(Australia) Adelaide United	Adelaide
19:00 ACST	? ?'	Report	Jovanovic ?'; Stanisic ?'; Ayoubi ?'; White ?'; Kwaaitaal ?'; Tatu ?'	Stadium: Marden Sports Complex

5 August 2025	West Adelaide (Australia)	0–9	(Australia) Adelaide United	Adelaide
19:00 ACST		Report	Jovanovic ?', ?'; Dukuly ?', ?'; Yull ?'; Barnett ?'; Kwaaitaal ?'; White ?'; Pierias ?'	Stadium: Kilburn Sportsplex

22 August 2025	North Eastern MetroStars (Australia)	Cancelled	(Australia) Adelaide United	Adelaide
19:00 ACST		Cancellation		Stadium: T.K. Shutter Reserve

2 September 2025	Melbourne City (Australia)	1–1	(Australia) Adelaide United	Melbourne
	Kuen 74'	Report	Jovanovic 25'	Stadium: The Home of the Matildas; Attendance: 0 (behind closed doors)

5 September 2025	Melbourne Victory (Australia)	1–2	(Australia) Adelaide United	Melbourne
	Vergos 50'	Report	Vriends 45'; Goodwin 60'	Stadium: The Home of the Matildas; Attendance: 0 (behind closed doors)

20 September 2025	NPLSA All-Stars (Australia)	2–2 (3–5 p)	(Australia) Adelaide United	Adelaide
16:30 ACST	Kasumović (o.g.); Santos De Oliveira	Report	Goodwin; Burkitt	Stadium: ServiceFM Stadium

27 September 2025	Adelaide United (Australia)	6–2	(Australia) North Eastern MetroStars	Adelaide
19:00 ACST	Dukuly 17'; Ayoubi ?', ?'; Pierias ?'; Anselmo ?'; Tatu ?'	Report	Visser ?'; Porter ?'	Stadium: Coopers Stadium; Attendance: 0 (behind closed doors); Referee: Daniel Elder

4 October 2025	Melbourne Victory (Australia)	3–0	(Australia) Adelaide United	Mildura
15:00 AEST	Razmovski 2'; Vergos 10'; Jelacic 16'	Report		Stadium: Mildura Sporting Precinct

== Competitions ==
=== Overall record ===
Competition	First match	Last match	Starting round	Final position	Record							
Competition	First match	Last match	Starting round	Final position	Pld	W	D	L	GF	GA	GD	Win %
A-League Men	17 October 2025	26 April 2026	Matchday 1	2nd	26	12	7	7	47	37	+10	46.15
A-League Men finals series	9 May 2026	15 May 2026	Semi-final	Semi-final	2	0	1	1	1	4	−3	0.00
Australia Cup	30 July 2025	30 July 2025	Round of 32	Round of 32	1	0	0	1	1	2	−1	0.00
Total					29	12	8	9	49	43	+6	41.38

Last updated: 9 May 2026
Source: Competitions

=== A-League Men ===
==== League table ====
Pos	Team	Pld	W	D	L	GF	GA	GD	Pts	Qualification
1	Newcastle Jets	26	15	3	8	55	39	+16	48	Qualification for the AFC Champions League Elite league stage and the finals series (Note: The top two teams enter the finals series at the semi-finals, while the teams ranked third to sixth enter the finals series at the elimination-finals.)
2	Adelaide United	26	12	7	7	46	36	+10	43	Qualification for the AFC Champions League Elite preliminary stage and the finals series
3	Auckland FC (Note: Auckland FC and Wellington Phoenix cannot qualify for Asian Football Confederation competitions as they are based in New Zealand, which is part of the Oceania Football Confederation.) (C)	26	11	9	6	42	29	+13	42	Qualification for the finals series
4	Melbourne Victory	26	11	7	8	44	33	+11	40	Qualification for the AFC Champions League Two group stage and the finals series (Note: Since the 2025 Australia Cup winners, Newcastle Jets, occupy an AFC Champions League Elite position, the AFC Champions League Two spot goes to the next eligible team. The AFC ruled that the Australia Cup runner-up Heidelberg United was ineligible to compete.)
5	Sydney FC	26	11	6	9	33	25	+8	39	Qualification for the finals series

Source: A-Leagues
Rules for classification: 1) points; 2) goal difference; 3) goals scored; 4) wins; 5) head-to-head results; 5a) head-to-head points; 5b) head-to-head goal difference; 6) Fair Play points; 7) away goal difference; 8) away goals per match; 9) home goal difference; 10) home goals per match; 11) toss of a coin in an event of a tie of two clubs.
(C) Champions

==== Results summary ====
Overall								Home						Away					
Pld	W	D	L	GF	GA	GD	Pts	W	D	L	GF	GA	GD	W	D	L	GF	GA	GD
26	12	7	7	46	36	+10	43	7	3	3	25	17	+8	5	4	4	21	19	+2

Last updated: 26 April 2026.
Source: Ultimate A-League

==== Results by round ====
Round	1	2	3	4	5	6	7	8	9	10	11	12	13	14	15	16	17	18	19	20	21	22	23	24	25	26
Ground	H	A	A	H	H	A	H	A	A	H	H	A	H	A	H	H	A	H	A	H	A	A	H	A	H	A
Result	W	L	L	W	W	L	L	L	W	W	L	D	W	W	D	L	W	W	D	D	D	W	D	D	W	W
Position	2	6	10	6	3	4	6	6	5	4	7	8	7	5	5	6	3	4	4	4	5	4	3	4	3	2
Points	3	3	3	6	9	9	9	9	12	15	15	16	19	22	23	23	26	29	30	31	32	35	36	37	40	43

Updated to match(es) played on 26 April 2026. Source: Ultimate A-League
A = Away; H = Home; W = Win; D = Draw; L = Loss

==== Matches ====
The fixtures for the league season were released on 11 September 2025.

Win Draw Loss Fixtures

17 October 2025 1	Adelaide United	2–1	Sydney FC	Adelaide
18:30 ACDT	Kitto 55'; Alagich 65'	Report	Lolley 90+1'	Stadium: Coopers Stadium; Attendance: 11,708; Referee: Alireza Faghani

27 October 2025 2	Macarthur FC	2–1	Adelaide United	Sydney
19:00 AEDT	Rose 11'; Ji 64'	Report	Yull 45+1'	Stadium: Campbelltown Sports Stadium; Attendance: 3,001; Referee: Shaun Evans

1 November 2025 3	Auckland FC	2–1	Adelaide United	Auckland
17:00 NZDT	Cosgrove 26'; Verstraete 79'	Report	Jovanovic 45'	Stadium: Go Media Stadium; Attendance: 11,240; Referee: Lachlan Keevers

7 November 2025 4	Adelaide United	2–0	Western Sydney Wanderers	Adelaide
19:05 ACDT	Jovanovic 63'; Goodwin 68'	Report		Stadium: Coopers Stadium; Attendance: 9,916; Referee: Lachlan Keevers

21 November 2025 5	Adelaide United	4–1	Melbourne City	Adelaide
19:05 ACDT	Alagich 12'; Jovanovic 15'; White 79'; Barnett 84'	Report	Kanamori 40'	Stadium: Coopers Stadium; Attendance: 10,260; Referee: Shaun Evans

29 November 2025 6	Wellington Phoenix	2–1	Adelaide United	Wellington
17:00 NZDT	Rufer 13'; Najjarine 52' (pen.)	Report	Garuccio 74'	Stadium: Sky Stadium; Attendance: 3,063; Referee: Daniel Elder

7 December 2025 7	Adelaide United	0–1	Brisbane Roar	Adelaide
19:05 ACDT		Report	Long 90+5'	Stadium: Coopers Stadium; Attendance: 10,678; Referee: Sam Kelly

13 December 2025 8	Melbourne Victory	2–1	Adelaide United	Melbourne
19:35 AEDT	Vergos 24', 46'	Report	Pierias 86'	Stadium: AAMI Park; Attendance: 9,103; Referee: Shaun Evans

20 December 2025 9	Perth Glory	0–1	Adelaide United	Perth
19:45 AWST		Report	Goodwin 12'	Stadium: HBF Park; Attendance: 6,678; Referee: Sam Kelly

27 December 2025 10	Adelaide United	3–2	Western Sydney Wanderers	Adelaide
19:05 ACDT	Jovanovic 31'; Ayoubi 67'; Yull 90+3'	Report	Hammond 55'; Borrello 71' (pen.)	Stadium: Coopers Stadium; Attendance: 13,582; Referee: Daniel Elder

4 January 2026 11	Adelaide United	0–4	Central Coast Mariners	Adelaide
19:05 ACDT		Report	McCalmont 8' (pen.); Ngor 20'; Brandtman 22'; Di Pizio 55'	Stadium: Coopers Stadium; Attendance: 12,325; Referee: Daniel Cook

11 January 2026 12	Wellington Phoenix	2–2	Adelaide United	Wellington
15:00 NZDT	Hughes 56'; Piper 65'	Report	White 14'; Duzel 44'	Stadium: Sky Stadium; Attendance: 3,068; Referee: Lachlan Keevers

17 January 2026 13	Adelaide United	2–1	Melbourne Victory	Adelaide
19:05 ACDT	Goodwin 6'; Kitto 90+7'	Report	Grimaldi 75'	Stadium: Coopers Stadium; Attendance: 14,784; Referee: Lachlan Keevers

24 January 2026 14	Brisbane Roar	2–3	Adelaide United	Brisbane
16:00 AEST	Klein 41'; Long 60'	Report	Burkitt 56', 70', 90+2'	Stadium: Suncorp Stadium; Attendance: 9,651; Referee: Alireza Faghani

30 January 2026 15	Adelaide United	1–1	Macarthur FC	Adelaide
19:35 ACDT	Yull 37'	Report	Ikonomidis 37'	Stadium: Coopers Stadium; Attendance: 7,343; Referee: Nathan Shakespear
Note: Due to forecasted heat, the match's kickoff time was postponed by 30 minutes.

8 February 2026 16	Adelaide United	2–3	Newcastle Jets	Adelaide
16:30 ACDT	Muñiz 53'; Dukuly 64'	Report	Taylor 45+2', 51', 72'	Stadium: Coopers Stadium; Attendance: 9,839; Referee: Jonathan Barreiro

14 February 2026 17	Sydney FC	1–2	Adelaide United	Sydney
19:35 AEDT	Quintal 14'	Report	Kitto 18'; Jovanovic 87'	Stadium: Allianz Stadium; Attendance: 8,816; Referee: Ben Abraham

20 February 2026 18	Adelaide United	4–0	Perth Glory	Adelaide
19:05 ACDT	Muñiz 12'; Yull 29'; Jovanovic 48'; Duzel 90+1'	Report		Stadium: Coopers Stadium; Attendance: 8,537; Referee: Shaun Evans

27 February 2026 19	Melbourne Victory	1–1	Adelaide United	Melbourne
19:35 AEDT	Jelacic 26'	Report	Dukuly 35'	Stadium: AAMI Park; Attendance: 11,506; Referee: Alex King

6 March 2026 20	Adelaide United	1–1	Wellington Phoenix	Adelaide
19:05 ACDT	Jovanovic 55'	Report	James 35'	Stadium: Coopers Stadium; Attendance: 9,111; Referee: Jonathan Barreiro

14 March 2026 21	Central Coast Mariners	1–1	Adelaide United	Gosford
15:00 AEDT	Ngor 59'	Report	Alagich 88'	Stadium: Polytec Stadium; Attendance: 4,727; Referee: Ben Abraham

20 March 2026 22	Western Sydney Wanderers	2–4	Adelaide United	Sydney
19:35 AEDT	Gersbach 9'; Thurgate 55'	Report	Jovanovic 22', 63'; Muñiz 45+1'; Kikianis 71'	Stadium: CommBank Stadium; Attendance: 6,281; Referee: Lachlan Keevers

3 April 2026 23	Adelaide United	1–1	Auckland FC	Adelaide
19:05 ACDT	Alagich 25'	Report	Gallegos 48'	Stadium: Coopers Stadium; Attendance: 13,725; Referee: Alex King

11 April 2026 24	Newcastle Jets	2–2	Adelaide United	Newcastle
15:00 AEST	Wilmering 90+4'	Report	White 73'	Stadium: McDonald Jones Stadium; Attendance: 10,959; Referee: Adam Kersey

19 April 2026 25	Adelaide United	3–1	Macarthur FC	Adelaide
15:00 ACST	Anselmo 63', 89'; Kikianis 75'	Report	Duke 7'	Stadium: Coopers Stadium; Attendance: 12,141; Referee: Adam Kersey

26 April 2026 26	Melbourne City	1–2	Adelaide United	Melbourne
17:00 AEST	Younis 17'	Report	Jovanovic 79', 90+8'	Stadium: AAMI Park; Attendance: 6,497; Referee: Alex King

==== Finals series ====
9 May 2025 Semi Final 1st Leg	Auckland FC	1–1	Adelaide United	Auckland
18:00 NZST	Brook 24'	Report	Crawford 63'	Stadium: Go Media Stadium; Attendance: 16,093; Referee: Ben Abraham

15 May 2025 Semi Final 2nd Leg	Adelaide United	0–3 (1–4 agg.)	Auckland FC	Adelaide
19:35 ACST		Report	Girdwood-Reich 44'; Cosgrove 58' (pen.); Rogerson 86'	Stadium: Coopers Stadium; Attendance: 14,716; Referee: Daniel Elder

=== Australia Cup ===
Win Draw Loss

30 July 2025 Round of 32	Newcastle Jets	2–1	Adelaide United	Maitland
19:30 AEDT	Gibson 31'; Badolato 48'	Report	Mauk 15'	Stadium: Maitland Sportsground; Attendance: 2,167; Referee: Joshua Attard

== Statistics ==
=== Appearances and goals ===
Includes all competitions. Players with no appearances not included in the list.

As of 16 May 2026

No.	Pos.	Nat.	Player	A-League Men		A-League Men finals series		Australia Cup		Total		Ref			
No.	Pos.	Nat.	Player	Apps	Goals	Apps	Goals	Apps	Goals	Apps	Goals	Ref			
No.	Pos.	Nat.	Player	3	DF	(Netherlands)	Bart Vriends	20	0	2	0	1	0	23	0
4	DF	(Australia)	Panagiotis Kikianis	23	2	2	0	1	0	26	2				
7	DF	(Australia)	Ryan Kitto	24	3	1	0	0	0	25	3				
9	FW	(Australia)	Luka Jovanovic	21+2	11	0+1	0	1	0	25	11				
10	MF	(Spain)	Juan Muñiz	15+9	3	0+2	0	0	0	26	3				
11	FW	(Australia)	Craig Goodwin	15+1	3	0+2	0	0	0	18	3				
12	MF	(Australia)	Jonny Yull	21+4	4	2	0	1	0	28	4				
13	GK	(Australia)	Max Vartuli	0	0	0	0	1	0	1	0				
14	MF	(Australia)	Jay Barnett	18+3	1	2	0	0	0	23	1				
17	FW	(Australia)	Ben Folami	0+6	0	0	0	0	0	6	0				
18	FW	(Australia)	Jake Najdovski	0+2	0	0	0	0	0	2	0				
19	FW	(Australia)	Yaya Dukuly	22+1	2	2	0	1	0	26	2				
20	DF	(Australia)	Dylan Pierias	8	1	0	0	1	0	9	1				
22	GK	(Netherlands)	Joshua Smits	26	0	2	0	0	0	28	0				
23	MF	(Australia)	Luke Duzel	13+10	2	1	0	1	0	25	2				
35	FW	(Australia)	Brody Burkitt	1+11	3	1+1	0	0	0	14	3				
36	DF	(Australia)	Panashe Madanha	2+12	0	0	0	0	0	14	0				
42	MF	(Lebanon)	Austin Ayoubi	1+11	1	0	0	0+1	0	13	1				
44	MF	(Australia)	Ryan White	18+6	3	2	0	1	0	27	3				
52	DF	(Australia)	Sotiri Phillis	5+1	0	0	0	0	0	6	0				
55	MF	(Australia)	Ethan Alagich	20+1	3	2	0	0	0	23	3				
58	FW	(Australia)	Harry Crawford	2+3	0	1+1	1	0+1	0	8	1				
62	MF	(Australia)	Fabian Talladira	2+6	0	0	0	1	0	9	0				
65	MF	(Australia)	Joey Garuccio	0+7	1	0	0	0	0	7	1				
71	DF	(Australia)	Vinko Stanisic	2+1	0	0	0	0	0	3	0				
74	FW	(Australia)	Amlani Tatu	0+5	0	0	0	0	0	5	0				
87	MF	(Brazil)	Anselmo	5+7	2	2	0	0	0	14	2				
99	FW	(South Sudan)	Ajak Riak	2+2	0	0	0	0	0	4	0				
Player(s) transferred out but featured this season
6	MF	(Australia)	Stefan Mauk	0	0	0	0	1	1	1	1				
43	FW	(Netherlands)	Julian Kwaaitaal	0	0	0	0	0+1	0	1	0				

=== Disciplinary record ===
Includes all competitions. The list is sorted by squad number when total cards are equal. Players with no cards not included in the list.

As of 16 May 2026

Rank	No.	Pos.	Nat.	Player	A-League Men			A-League Men finals series			Australia Cup			Total			Ref
Rank	No.	Pos.	Nat.	Player	Booked	(yellow card) (yellow-red card)	Sent off (straight red)	Booked	(yellow card) (yellow-red card)	Sent off (straight red)	Booked	(yellow card) (yellow-red card)	Sent off (straight red)	Booked	(yellow card) (yellow-red card)	Sent off (straight red)	Ref
1	20	DF	(Australia)	Dylan Pierias	0	0	1	0	0	0	0	0	0	0	0	1	
1	36	FW	(Australia)	Panashe Madanha	0	0	1	0	0	0	0	0	0	0	0	1	
3	9	FW	(Australia)	Luka Jovanovic	2	1	0	0	0	0	0	0	0	2	1	0	
4	4	DF	(Australia)	Panagiotis Kikianis	5	0	0	1	0	0	0	0	0	6	0	0	
4	55	MF	(Australia)	Ethan Alagich	5	0	0	1	0	0	0	0	0	5	0	0	
6	10	MF	(Spain)	Juan Muñiz	3	0	0	0	0	0	0	0	0	3	0	0	
6	11	FW	(Australia)	Craig Goodwin	3	0	0	0	0	0	0	0	0	3	0	0	
6	19	FW	(Australia)	Yaya Dukuly	3	0	0	0	0	0	0	0	0	3	0	0	
6	23	MF	(Australia)	Luke Duzel	3	0	0	0	0	0	0	0	0	3	0	0	
10	3	DF	(Netherlands)	Bart Vriends	2	0	0	0	0	0	0	0	0	2	0	0	
10	35	FW	(Australia)	Brody Burkitt	2	0	0	0	0	0	0	0	0	2	0	0	
10	44	MF	(Australia)	Ryan White	2	0	0	0	0	0	0	0	0	2	0	0	
10	87	MF	(Brazil)	Anselmo	2	0	0	0	0	0	0	0	0	2	0	0	
14	7	DF	(Australia)	Ryan Kitto	1	0	0	0	0	0	0	0	0	1	0	0	
14	14	DF	(Australia)	Jay Barnett	1	0	0	0	0	0	0	0	0	1	0	0	
14	22	GK	(Netherlands)	Joshua Smits	1	0	0	0	0	0	0	0	0	1	0	0	
14	52	DF	(Australia)	Sotiri Phillis	1	0	0	0	0	0	0	0	0	1	0	0	
14	58	FW	(Australia)	Harry Crawford	0	0	0	1	0	0	0	0	0	1	0	0	
14	71	DF	(Australia)	Vinko Stanisic	1	0	0	0	0	0	0	0	0	1	0	0	
Total					37	1	2	3	0	0	0	0	0	40	1	2	

=== Clean sheets ===
Includes all competitions. The list is sorted by squad number when total clean sheets are equal. Numbers in parentheses represent games where both goalkeepers participated and both kept a clean sheet; the number in parentheses is awarded to the goalkeeper who was substituted on, whilst a full clean sheet is awarded to the goalkeeper who was on the field at the start of play. Goalkeepers with no clean sheets not included in the list.

As of 15 May 2026

Rank	No.	Nat.	Goalkeeper	A-League Men	A-League Men finals series	Australia Cup	Total
1	22	(Netherlands)	Joshua Smits	3	0	0	3
Total				3	0	0	3

== See also ==
- 2025–26 Adelaide United FC (women) season
