= 2025–26 A-League Men =

49th season of top-tier soccer league in Australia

A-League Men
- Season: 2025–26
- Dates: 17 October 2025 – 23 May 2026
- Champions: Auckland FC (1st title)
- Premiers: Newcastle Jets (1st title)
- Champions League Elite: Newcastle Jets; Adelaide United
- Champions League Two: Melbourne Victory
- Matches: 163
- Goals: 460 (2.82 per match)
- Top goalscorer: Sam Cosgrove; Luka Jovanovic (11 goals each)
- Best goalkeeper: Harrison Devenish-Meares (11 clean sheets)
- Biggest home win: Melbourne City 4–0 Perth Glory (25 October 2025); Melbourne Victory 5–1 Wellington Phoenix (29 December 2025); Macarthur FC 6–2 Melbourne City (24 January 2026); Melbourne Victory 4–0 Sydney FC (26 January 2026); Adelaide United 4–0 Perth Glory (20 February 2026); Newcastle Jets 4–0 Central Coast Mariners (25 April 2026)
- Biggest away win: Wellington Phoenix 0–5 Auckland FC (21 February 2026)
- Highest scoring: Newcastle Jets 4–5 Macarthur FC (26 December 2025)
- Longest winning run: 8 matches Newcastle Jets
- Longest unbeaten run: 10 matches Newcastle Jets; Adelaide United
- Longest winless run: 12 matches Brisbane Roar
- Longest losing run: 5 matches Western Sydney Wanderers
- Highest attendance: 33,265; Sydney FC 4–1 Western Sydney Wanderers (31 January 2026)
- Lowest attendance: 1,601; Central Coast Mariners 1–1 Macarthur FC (18 January 2026)
- Total attendance: 1,447,247
- Average attendance: 8,879

The 2025–26 A-League Men, known as the Isuzu UTE A-League for sponsorship reasons, was the 49th season of national level men's soccer in Australia, and the 21st since the establishment of the competition as the A-League in 2004. Auckland FC were the defending premiers while Melbourne City were the defending champions.

== Clubs ==
The number of clubs reduced from 13 in the 2024–25 season to 12, following the removal of Western United by Football Australia for financial reasons.

=== Stadiums and locations ===
Twelve clubs are participating in the 2025–26 season.

Note: Table lists in alphabetical order.

Club	City	Home ground	Capacity
Adelaide United	Adelaide	Coopers Stadium	16,500
Auckland FC	Auckland	Go Media Stadium	27,700 (new capacity)
Brisbane Roar	Brisbane	Suncorp Stadium	52,500
Brisbane Roar	City of Moreton Bay	Kayo Stadium	10,000
Brisbane Roar	Sunshine Coast	Sunshine Coast Stadium	20,000
Central Coast Mariners	Gosford	Polytec Stadium	20,059
Macarthur FC	Sydney	Campbelltown Sports Stadium	17,500
Melbourne City	Melbourne	AAMI Park	30,050
Melbourne Victory	Melbourne	AAMI Park	30,050
Newcastle Jets	Newcastle	McDonald Jones Stadium	30,000
Perth Glory	Perth	HBF Park	20,500
Sydney FC	Sydney	Allianz Stadium	42,500
Sydney FC	Sydney	Leichhardt Oval	20,000
Wellington Phoenix	Wellington	Hnry Stadium	34,500
Wellington Phoenix	Christchurch	Apollo Projects Stadium	17,104
Western Sydney Wanderers	Sydney	CommBank Stadium	30,000

=== Personnel and kits ===
Team	Manager	Captain	Kit manufacturer	Kit sponsor
Adelaide United	(Brazil) Airton Andrioli	(Australia) Craig Goodwin	UCAN	Mega Rewards; 1KOMMA5° (Note: Away kit)
Auckland FC	(Australia) Steve Corica	(Japan) Hiroki Sakai	New Balance	ANZ
Brisbane Roar	(Australia) Michael Valkanis	(Republic of Ireland) Jay O'Shea	Cikers	Value Dental Centres
Central Coast Mariners	(Australia) Warren Moon	(Australia) Trent Sainsbury	O'Neills	polytec
Macarthur FC	(Australia) Mile Sterjovski	(Australia) Luke Brattan	Kelme	SipEnergy
Melbourne City	(Australia) Aurelio Vidmar	(Australia) Aziz Behich	Puma	Etihad Airways
Melbourne Victory	(Australia) Arthur Diles	(Portugal) Roderick Miranda	Macron	Turkish Airlines
Newcastle Jets	(Australia) Mark Milligan	(Australia) Kosta Grozos	New Balance	Emerald Horizon
Perth Glory	(Australia) Adam Griffiths	(Australia) Adam Taggart (England) Scott Wootton	Macron	La Vida Homes
Sydney FC	(Australia) Patrick Kisnorbo	(Australia) Rhyan Grant	Under Armour	Macquarie University
Wellington Phoenix	(England) Chris Greenacre (caretaker)	(New Zealand) Alex Rufer	Dynasty Sport	Entelar Group; Oppo
Western Sydney Wanderers	(Australia) Gary van Egmond (caretaker)	(Australia) Lawrence Thomas	Adidas	Bathla; Turner Freeman Lawyers

=== Managerial changes ===
Team	Outgoing manager	Manner of departure	Date of vacancy	Position on table	Incoming manager	Date of appointment
Newcastle Jets	(Australia) Robert Stanton	End of contract	5 May 2025	Pre-season	(Australia) Mark Milligan	6 May 2025
Brisbane Roar	(Australia) Ruben Zadkovich	Mutual consent	6 May 2025	Pre-season	(Australia) Michael Valkanis	7 May 2025
Adelaide United	(Australia) Carl Veart	End of contract	10 May 2025	Pre-season	(Brazil) Airton Andrioli	26 May 2025
Central Coast Mariners	(England) Mark Jackson	Signed by Buriram United	10 October 2025	Pre-season	(Australia) Warren Moon (caretaker)	15 October 2025
Perth Glory	(Australia) David Zdrilic	Sacked	28 October 2025	12th	(Australia) Adam Griffiths (caretaker)	31 October 2025
Perth Glory	(Australia) Adam Griffiths (caretaker)	Promoted to full-time	N/A	5th	(Australia) Adam Griffiths	16 December 2025
Central Coast Mariners	(Australia) Warren Moon (caretaker)	Promoted to full-time	N/A	11th	(Australia) Warren Moon	6 January 2026
Western Sydney Wanderers	(Australia) Alen Stajcic	Sacked	20 January 2026	12th	(Australia) Gary van Egmond (caretaker)	21 January 2026
Wellington Phoenix	(Australia) Giancarlo Italiano	Resigned	21 February 2026	10th	(England) Chris Greenacre (caretaker)	23 February 2026
Sydney FC	(Australia) Ufuk Talay	Mutual termination	24 March 2026	5th	(Australia) Patrick Kisnorbo	24 March 2026

=== Foreign players ===
Club	Visa 1	Visa 2	Visa 3	Visa 4	Visa 5	Non-visa foreigner(s)	Former player(s)
Adelaide United	(Brazil) Anselmo	(Netherlands) Joshua Smits	(Netherlands) Bart Vriends	(Spain) Juan Muñiz		(Lebanon) Austin Ayoubi (Note: Australian citizens (or New Zealand citizens, in the case of Auckland FC and/or Wellington Phoenix) who have chosen to represent another national team) (South Sudan) Ajak Riak	(Netherlands) Julian Kwaaitaal
Auckland FC	(Belgium) Louis Verstraete	(Chile) Felipe Gallegos	(England) Sam Cosgrove	(Japan) Hiroki Sakai	(Uruguay) Guillermo May	(Fiji) Dan Hall	
Brisbane Roar	(Bosnia and Herzegovina) Milorad Stajić	(Costa Rica) Youstin Salas	(England) Chris Long	(New Zealand) James McGarry	(Norway) Marius Lode	(Greece) Georgios Vrakas (Republic of Ireland) Jay O'Shea (Note: Those players who were born and started their professional career abroad but have since gained Australian citizenship (or New Zealand citizenship, in the case of Auckland FC and/or Wellington Phoenix))	
Central Coast Mariners	(Japan) Kaito Taniguchi	(New Zealand) Seth Clark	(Northern Ireland) Alfie McCalmont			(New Zealand) Storm Roux	(England) Ryan Edmondson (Iraq) Abdelelah Faisal
Macarthur FC	(Croatia) Šime Gržan	(France) Damien Da Silva	(Mexico) Rafael Durán	(Poland) Filip Kurto	(South Korea) Ji Dong-won		
Melbourne City	(Argentina) Germán Ferreyra	(Austria) Andreas Kuen	(France) Samuel Souprayen	(Japan) Takeshi Kanamori	(Kosovo) Elbasan Rashani	(Indonesia) Mathew Baker	
Melbourne Victory	(Brazil) Clarismario Santos	(Greece) Nikos Vergos	(Japan) Charles Nduka	(Portugal) Roderick Miranda	(Spain) Juan Mata	(Ivory Coast) Adama Traoré	
Newcastle Jets	(England) Zach Clough	(Republic of Ireland) Joe Shaughnessy	(Japan) Kota Mizunuma			(Malta) Lucas Scicluna (New Zealand) Lachlan Bayliss	
Perth Glory	(England) Scott Wootton	(New Zealand) Sam Sutton	(Vanuatu) Brian Kaltak	(Wales) Tom Lawrence		(England) Callum Timmins (Iraq) Charbel Shamoon (North Macedonia) Stefan Colakovski (South Sudan) Joel Anasmo	(England) Luke Amos
Sydney FC	(Democratic Republic of the Congo) Marcel Tisserand	(England) Joe Lolley	(Germany) Ahmet Arslan	(Peru) Piero Quispe	(Spain) Víctor Campuzano	(Wales) Joe Lacey	
Wellington Phoenix	(Canada) Manjrekar James	(England) Josh Oluwayemi	(Japan) Kazuki Nagasawa	(Nigeria) Ifeanyi Eze	(Norway) Sander Kartum	(Lebanon) Ramy Najjarine	(Japan) Hideki Ishige
Western Sydney Wanderers	(Bulgaria) Bozhidar Kraev	(Japan) Hiroshi Ibusuki	(New Zealand) Kosta Barbarouses	(Scotland) Ryan Fraser			(Iraq) Mohamed Al-Taay

== Regular season ==
The regular season is made up of a full home-and-away 22-match schedule for each club, plus four extra rounds, for a total of 26 matches played. The top six will qualify for the finals series.

=== League table ===
Pos	Team	Pld	W	D	L	GF	GA	GD	Pts	Qualification
1	Newcastle Jets	26	15	3	8	55	39	+16	48	Qualification for the AFC Champions League Elite league stage and the finals series (Note: The top two teams enter the finals series at the semi-finals, while the teams ranked third to sixth enter the finals series at the elimination-finals.)
2	Adelaide United	26	12	7	7	46	36	+10	43	Qualification for the AFC Champions League Elite preliminary stage and the finals series
3	Auckland FC (Note: Auckland FC and Wellington Phoenix cannot qualify for Asian Football Confederation competitions as they are based in New Zealand, which is part of the Oceania Football Confederation.) (C)	26	11	9	6	42	29	+13	42	Qualification for the finals series
4	Melbourne Victory	26	11	7	8	44	33	+11	40	Qualification for the AFC Champions League Two group stage and the finals series (Note: Since the 2025 Australia Cup winners, Newcastle Jets, occupy an AFC Champions League Elite position, the AFC Champions League Two spot goes to the next eligible team. The AFC ruled that the Australia Cup runner-up Heidelberg United was ineligible to compete.)
5	Sydney FC	26	11	6	9	33	25	+8	39	Qualification for the finals series
6	Melbourne City	26	10	8	8	33	33	0	38	Qualification for the finals series
7	Macarthur FC	26	9	7	10	37	44	−7	34	
8	Wellington Phoenix	26	9	6	11	36	48	−12	33	
9	Central Coast Mariners	26	8	8	10	35	42	−7	32	
10	Perth Glory	26	8	7	11	32	39	−7	31	
11	Brisbane Roar	26	6	8	12	27	36	−9	26	
12	Western Sydney Wanderers	26	5	6	15	27	43	−16	21	

Source: A-Leagues
Rules for classification: 1) points; 2) goal difference; 3) goals scored; 4) wins; 5) head-to-head results; 5a) head-to-head points; 5b) head-to-head goal difference; 6) Fair Play points; 7) away goal difference; 8) away goals per match; 9) home goal difference; 10) home goals per match; 11) toss of a coin in an event of a tie of two clubs.
(C) Champions

=== Fixtures and results ===
Home \ Away	ADL	AKL	BRI	CCM	MAC	MCY	MVC	NEW	PER	SYD	WEL	WSW	ADL	AKL	BRI	CCM	MAC	MCY	MVC	NEW	PER	SYD	WEL	WSW
Adelaide United		1–1	0–1	0–4	1–1	4–1	2–1	2–3	4–0	2–1	1–1	2–0					3–1							3–2
Auckland FC	2–1		1–1	2–2	1–2	3–0	2–2	1–2	2–2	1–0	3–1	1–0				0–1				1–3				
Brisbane Roar	2–3	0–2		1–2	1–0	0–0	1–0	3–0	1–1	0–0	0–3	2–2						2–3					1–2	
Central Coast Mariners	1–1	1–2	1–2		1–1	0–0	1–0	3–2	2–2	1–2	1–1	3–2			2–2					0–0				
Macarthur FC	2–1	1–1	2–1	1–3		6–2	0–0	3–2	0–2	0–3	4–0	1–1									2–2			0–4
Melbourne City	1–2	2–1	1–0	2–1	1–1		0–1	0–1	4–0	0–0	2–0	3–0							1–3		1–3			
Melbourne Victory	2–1	0–0	1–1	4–1	4–1	0–2		2–2	3–2	4–0	5–1	0–1	1–1										0–1	
Newcastle Jets	1–1	1–2	4–1	4–0	4–5	0–1	5–2		1–2	1–4	4–1	2–1					1–0					2–0		
Perth Glory	0–1	2–1	1–2	0–1	3–1	1–1	0–2	1–3		0–1	2–2	1–0			2–1	3–0								
Sydney FC	1–2	1–1	1–0	2–0	2–0	0–1	3–0	1–2	0–0		0–2	4–1		2–2					2–2					
Wellington Phoenix	2–1	1–2	2–1	3–1	0–1	2–2	2–3	1–3	2–0	0–1		2–1	2–2	0–5										
Western Sydney Wanderers	2–4	0–2	0–0	3–2	0–1	1–1	0–2	1–2	1–0	1–0	2–2							1–1				0–2		

Updated to match(es) played on 26 April 2026. Source: Aleagues.com.au
Legend: Blue = home team win; Yellow = draw; Red = away team win.

== Finals series ==
The finals series ran over four weeks, involving the top six teams from the regular season. In the first week of fixtures, the third-through-sixth ranked teams played a single-elimination match, with the two winners of those matches joining the first and second ranked teams in two-legged semi-final ties. The two winners of those matches met in the Grand Final.

=== Bracket ===
Elimination-finals
4	Melbourne Victory	0
5	Sydney FC	1
3	Auckland FC (p)	1 (7)
6	Melbourne City	1 (6)

Semi-finals
1	Newcastle Jets	1	1	2 (2)
5	Sydney FC (p)	1	1	2 (4)
2	Adelaide United	1	0	1
3	Auckland FC	1	3	4

Grand Final
3	Auckland FC	1
5	Sydney FC	0

=== Elimination-finals ===
2 May 2026
17:00 NZST

Auckland FC	1–1 (a.e.t.)	Melbourne City
May 45+3'	Report	Memeti 90+4'
Penalties
Cosgrove (penalty scored); May (penalty scored); Brimmer (penalty scored); Gillion (penalty scored); Pijnaker (penalty scored); Sakai (penalty scored); Hall (penalty scored)	7–6	Nabbout (penalty scored); Leckie (penalty scored); Younis (penalty scored); Schreiber (penalty scored); Memeti (penalty scored); Behich (penalty scored); Atkinson (penalty missed)

Go Media Stadium, Auckland
Attendance: 11,351
Referee: Alex King

2 May 2026
19:40 AEST

Melbourne Victory	0–1	Sydney FC
	Report	Wood 80'

AAMI Park, Melbourne
Attendance: 15,258
Referee: Lachlan Keevers

=== Semi-finals ===
==== Summary ====
Team 1	Agg.	Team 2	1st leg	2nd leg
Newcastle Jets	2–2 (2–4 p)	Sydney FC	1–1	1–1 (a.e.t.)
Adelaide United	1–4	Auckland FC	1–1	0–3

==== Matches ====
9 May 2026
19:40 AEST

Sydney FC	1–1	Newcastle Jets
Stamatelopoulos 50'	Report	Adams 58'

Allianz Stadium, Sydney
Attendance: 17,771
Referee: Daniel Elder
16 May 2026
19:40 AEST

Newcastle Jets	1–1 (a.e.t.)	Sydney FC
Adams 90+5'	Report	Quispe 63'
Penalties
Grozos (penalty missed); Mizunuma (penalty scored); Gibson (penalty scored); Bertoncello (penalty missed)	2–4	Lolley (penalty missed); Youlley (penalty scored); Campuzano (penalty scored); R. Grant (penalty scored); Garuccio (penalty scored)

McDonald Jones Stadium, Newcastle
Attendance: 25,082
Referee: Shaun Evans

2–2 on aggregate, Sydney FC won 4–2 on penalties.

9 May 2026
18:00 NZST

Auckland FC	1–1	Adelaide United
Brook 24'	Report	Crawford 63'

Go Media Stadium, Auckland
Attendance: 16,093
Referee: Ben Abraham
15 May 2026
19:05 ACST

Adelaide United	0–3	Auckland FC
	Report	Girdwood-Reich 44'; Cosgrove 58' (pen.); Rogerson 86'

Coopers Stadium, Adelaide
Attendance: 14,716
Referee: Daniel Elder

Auckland FC won 4–1 on aggregate.

=== Grand Final ===
23 May 2026
20:10 NZST

Auckland FC	1–0	Sydney FC
Howieson 60'	Report

Go Media Stadium, Auckland
Attendance: 28,374
Referee: Alex King

== Regular season statistics ==
=== Top scorers ===
As of end of regular season

Rank	Player	Club	Goals
1	(England) Sam Cosgrove	Auckland FC	11
1	(Australia) Luka Jovanovic	Adelaide United	11
3	(Nigeria) Ifeanyi Eze	Wellington Phoenix	10
4	(New Zealand) Jesse Randall	Auckland FC	9
4	(Australia) Clayton Taylor	Newcastle Jets	9
6	(Australia) Eli Adams	Newcastle Jets	8
6	(Australia) Lachlan Brook	Auckland FC	8
6	(Australia) Max Caputo	Melbourne City	8
6	(Australia) Lachlan Rose	Newcastle Jets	8
10	(Australia) Xavier Bertoncello	Newcastle Jets	7
10	(Greece) Nikos Vergos	Melbourne Victory	7
10	(Australia) Marcus Younis	Melbourne City	7

=== Hat-tricks ===
Player	For	Against	Result	Date	Ref.
(Australia) Alexander Badolato	Newcastle Jets	Melbourne Victory	5–2 (H)	24 October 2025	
(Australia) Al Hassan Toure	Sydney FC	Newcastle Jets	1–4 (A)	1 November 2025	
(Wales) Tom Lawrence	Perth Glory	Melbourne City	1–3 (A)	28 December 2025	
(Greece) Nikos Vergos	Melbourne Victory	Wellington Phoenix	5–1 (H)	29 December 2025	
(Australia) Brody Burkitt	Adelaide United	Brisbane Roar	2–3 (A)	24 January 2026	
(Australia) Clayton Taylor	Newcastle Jets	Adelaide United	2–3 (A)	8 February 2026	

Key
(H)	Home team
(A)	Away team

=== Clean sheets ===
As of end of regular season

Rank	Goalkeeper	Club	Clean sheets
1	(Australia) Harrison Devenish-Meares	Sydney FC	11
2	(Australia) Patrick Beach	Melbourne City	9
3	(Australia) Dean Bouzanis	Brisbane Roar	7
3	(New Zealand) Michael Woud	Auckland FC	7
5	(Australia) Andrew Redmayne	Central Coast Mariners	6
6	(Australia) James Delianov	Newcastle Jets	5
6	(Australia) Lawrence Thomas	Western Sydney Wanderers	5
8	(Australia) Jack Duncan	Melbourne Victory	4
8	(Australia) Matt Sutton	Perth Glory	4
10	(Poland) Filip Kurto	Macarthur FC	3
10	(Netherlands) Joshua Smits	Adelaide United	3

== Awards ==
=== Annual awards ===
Award	Winner	Club	Ref.
Johnny Warren Medal	(Spain) Juan Mata	Melbourne Victory	
Young Footballer of the Year	(Australia) Eli Adams	Newcastle Jets	
Golden Boot Award	(England) Sam Cosgrove (Australia) Luka Jovanovic	Auckland FC; Adelaide United	
Goalkeeper of the Year	(Australia) Harrison Devenish-Meares	Sydney FC	
Goal of the Year	(Costa Rica) Youstin Salas	Brisbane Roar	
Save of the Year	(Australia) Harrison Devenish-Meares	Sydney FC	
Playmaker of the Year	(Spain) Juan Mata	Melbourne Victory	
Fan Player of the Year	(Australia) Daniel Wilmering	Newcastle Jets	
Coach of the Year	(Australia) Mark Milligan	Newcastle Jets	
Fair Play Award	Newcastle Jets		
Referee of the Year	(Australia) Alex King	—N/a	

=== Club awards ===
Club	Player of the Season	Ref.
Adelaide United	(Australia) Ryan White	
Auckland FC	(Belgium) Louis Verstraete	
Brisbane Roar	(Australia) Sam Klein	
Central Coast Mariners	(Australia) Andrew Redmayne	
Macarthur FC	(Australia) Liam Rose	
Melbourne City	(Australia) Aziz Behich	
Melbourne Victory	(Spain) Juan Mata	
Newcastle Jets	(Australia) Max Burgess	
Perth Glory	(Vanuatu) Brian Kaltak	
Sydney FC	(Australia) Paul Okon-Engstler	
Wellington Phoenix	(Nigeria) Ifeanyi Eze (New Zealand) Alex Rufer	
Western Sydney Wanderers	(Australia) Angus Thurgate	

=== Team of the season ===
Goalkeeper	Defenders	Midfielders	Forwards	Substitutes
(Australia) Harrison Devenish-Meares (Sydney FC)	(Australia) Nathaniel Atkinson (Melbourne City) (Australia) Panagiotis Kikianis (Adelaide United) (Australia) Mark Natta (Newcastle Jets) (New Zealand) Francis de Vries (Auckland FC)	(Australia) Ethan Alagich (Adelaide United) (Spain) Juan Mata (Melbourne Victory) (Australia) Max Burgess (Newcastle Jets)	(Australia) Clayton Taylor (Newcastle Jets) (England) Sam Cosgrove (Auckland FC) (New Zealand) Jesse Randall (Auckland FC)	(Australia) James Delianov (Newcastle Jets) (Australia) Daniel Wilmering (Newcastle Jets) (Australia) Aziz Behich (Melbourne City) (New Zealand) Lachlan Bayliss (Newcastle Jets) (Australia) Paul Okon-Engstler (Sydney FC) (Australia) Eli Adams (Newcastle Jets) (Australia) Marcus Younis (Melbourne City)

== Attendances ==
A-League clubs listed by average home league attendance:

Pos	Club	Average attendance
1	Auckland FC	13,256
2	Sydney FC	12,459
3	Adelaide United	11,073
4	Melbourne Victory	11,024
5	Newcastle Jets	9,496
6	Western Sydney Wanderers	8,043
7	Melbourne City	7,319
8	Perth Glory	7,080
9	Brisbane Roar	6,624
10	Wellington Phoenix	5,697
11	Central Coast Mariners	5,104
12	Macarthur FC	4,193

== See also ==
- 2025–26 A-League Women
- 2025–26 Adelaide United FC season
- 2025–26 Auckland FC season
- 2025–26 Brisbane Roar FC season
- 2025–26 Central Coast Mariners FC season
- 2025–26 Macarthur FC season
- 2025–26 Melbourne City FC season
- 2025–26 Melbourne Victory FC season
- 2025–26 Newcastle Jets FC season
- 2025–26 Perth Glory FC season
- 2025–26 Sydney FC season
- 2025–26 Wellington Phoenix FC season
- 2025–26 Western Sydney Wanderers FC season
- 2025–26 Western United FC season
