= List of Adelaide United FC head coaches =

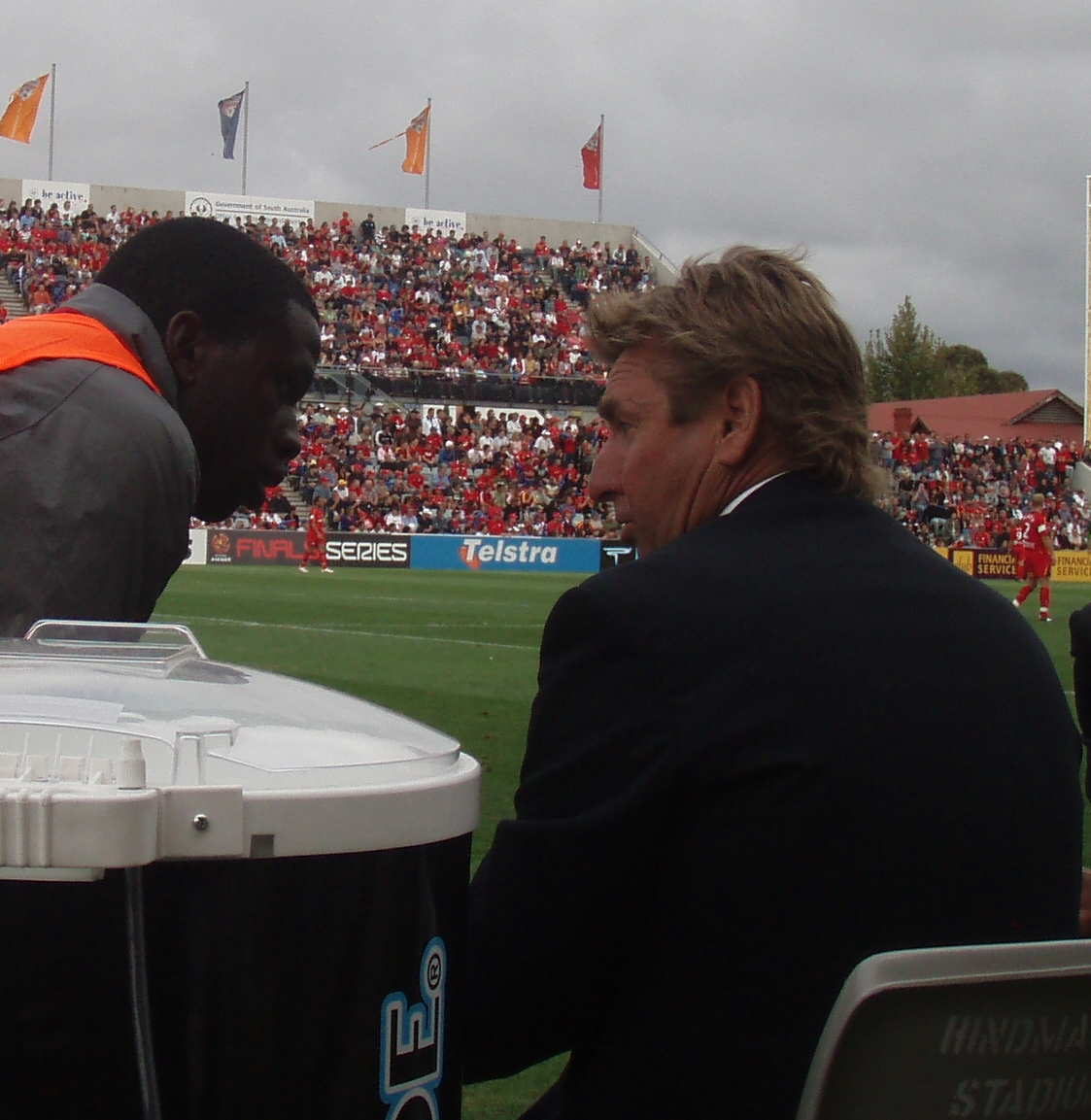
John Kosmina, the club's first head coach.

Adelaide United Football Club is a professional men's soccer club located in Adelaide, South Australia, Australia. Established in 2003, the club was formed to compete in the final season of the National Soccer League after the withdrawals of West Adelaide and Adelaide City, in 1999 and 2003 respectively, left South Australia without representation in the competition. The club was one of the eight founding members of the A-League Men and have competed in it concurrently since its formation, under licence from the Australian Professional Leagues. In their history, they have been managed by ten different head coaches.

Carl Veart is the club's longest serving head coach, in charge for 4 years and 345 days. Airton Andrioli is the current head coach of Adelaide United. Guillermo Amor is the most successful coach in club history, winning the 2015–16 A-League premiership and championship double. Adelaide United head coaches have won A-League Men Coach of the Year on three occasions: Aurelio Vidmar in 2009, Guillermo Amor in 2016, and Carl Veart in 2023.

== List of head coaches ==
- Names of caretaker head coaches are supplied where known, and periods of caretaker management are highlighted in italics and marked † or ‡, depending on the scenario. Win percentage is rounded to two decimal places.
- Only first-team competitive matches are counted. Wins, losses and draws are results at the final whistle; the results of penalty shoot-outs are not counted.
- Statistics are complete up to and including the match played on 1 November 2026.

Key

- M = matches played; W = matches won; D = matches drawn; L = matches lost; GF = Goals for; GA = Goals against; Win % = percentage of total matches won
- † Head coaches with this background and symbol in the "Name" column are italicised to denote interim appointments.
- ‡ Head coaches with this background and symbol in the "Name" column denote interim appointments promoted to full-time manager.

List of Adelaide United FC head coaches
No.	Name	From	To	Tenure	M	W	D	L	GF	GA	Win %	Honours	Ref
1	(Australia) John Kosmina	12 September 2003	23 February 2007	3 years, 164 days	88	42	21	25	145	131	47.73	A-League premiers: 2005–06; Pre-season Cup winners: 2006	
2	(Australia) Aurelio Vidmar ‡	23 February 2007	3 June 2010	3 years, 100 days	102	39	30	33	126	79	38.24	Pre-season Cup winners: 2007; Coach of the year: 2008–09	
3	(Netherlands) Rini Coolen	5 July 2010	18 December 2011	1 year, 166 days	50	21	10	19	70	62	42.00		
(1)	(Australia) John Kosmina	18 December 2011	28 January 2013	1 year, 41 days (Note: John Kosmina's total time served across two tenures was 4 years, 205 days.)	44	19	10	15	60	54	43.18		
4	(Australia) Michael Valkanis †	28 January 2013	1 July 2013	154 days	10	2	3	5	11	11	20.00		
5	(Spain) Josep Gombau	1 July 2013	24 July 2015	2 years, 23 days	62	30	12	20	105	61	48.39	FFA Cup winners: 2014	
6	(Spain) Guillermo Amor	24 July 2015	10 May 2017	1 year, 290 days	67	24	17	26	98	82	35.82	A-League premiers: 2015–16; A-League champions: 2016; Coach of the year: 2015–16	
7	(Germany) Marco Kurz	16 June 2017	22 May 2019	1 year, 340 days	67	33	14	20	98	67	49.25	FFA Cup winners: 2018	
8	(Netherlands) Gertjan Verbeek	22 May 2019	29 April 2020	343 days	26	14	0	12	49	47	53.85	FFA Cup winners: 2019	
9	(Australia) Carl Veart ‡	15 June 2020 (Note: Carl Veart was appointed as an interim on 15 June 2020, and was promoted to full-time on 18 September 2020.)	26 May 2025	4 years, 345 days	157	66	39	52	278	206	42.04	Coach of the year: 2022–23	
10	(Brazil) Airton Andrioli	26 May 2025	Incumbent (Note: Airton Andrioli is under contract until the end of the 2026–27 season, with the option of an additional year.)	1 year, 160 days	35	14	8	13	54	53	40.00		
