= Auckland FC league record by opponent =

Auckland FC is an Australian professional association football club based at Mount Smart Stadium in Auckland, New Zealand. The club was formed in 2024, making them the third Auckland based team playing in Australian football after the Football Kingz and the New Zealand Knights. They are also the third New Zealand side to compete in the A-League Men after the Knights and the Wellington Phoenix.

Auckland's first team compete in the A-League Men. Their record against each club faced are listed below. Auckland FC's first A-League Men match was against Brisbane Roar.

== All-time league record ==
Statistics correct as of match played on 23 November 2025.

Colour key

Positive balance (more wins in total matches)
Neutral balance (equal W/L ratio in total matches)
Negative balance (more losses in total matches)

Key

- The table includes results of matches played by Auckland FC in the A-League Men regular season and Finals series.
- **Bolded** clubs competed in the 2025–26 A-League Men alongside Auckland FC.
- Italicised clubs are defunct.
- P = matches played; W = matches won; D = matches drawn; L = matches lost; GF = goals for; GA = goals against; GD = goal difference; Win% = percentage of matches won.
- The columns headed "First" and "Last" contain the first and most recent seasons in which Auckland FC played league matches against each opponent.
- Unite Round games have been included in the Total column only as they are played at a neutral venue.

Auckland FC league record by opponent
Club	Home							Away							Total								First	Last
Club	P	W	D	L	GF	GA	GD	P	W	D	L	GF	GA	GD	P	W	D	L	GF	GA	GD	Win%	First	Last
**Adelaide United**	2	1	1	0	6	5	+0	1	0	1	0	2	2	+0	3	1	2	0	8	7	+1	33.33	2024–25	2025–26
**Brisbane Roar**	2	1	1	0	3	1	+2	1	1	0	0	2	0	+2	3	2	1	0	5	1	+4	66.67	2024–25	2025–26
**Central Coast Mariners**	1	0	1	0	2	2	+0	1	1	0	0	4	1	+3	2	1	1	0	6	3	+3	50.00	2024–25	2025–26
**Macarthur FC**	1	1	0	0	2	1	+1	0	0	0	0	0	0	0	2	2	0	0	3	1	+2	100.00	2024–25	2025–26
**Melbourne City**	1	1	0	0	3	0	+3	1	0	1	0	2	2	+0	2	1	1	0	5	2	+3	50.00	2024–25	2025–26
**Melbourne Victory**	2	0	1	1	0	2	+0	3	2	1	0	3	0	+2	5	2	2	1	3	2	+1	40.00	2024–25	2025–26
**Newcastle Jets**	1	1	0	0	2	0	+2	1	0	1	0	1	1	+0	2	1	1	0	3	1	+2	50.00	2024–25	2025–26
**Perth Glory**	1	1	0	0	1	0	+1	1	0	0	1	0	1	−1	2	1	0	1	1	1	+0	50.00	2024–25	2025–26
**Sydney FC**	1	1	0	0	1	0	+1	1	0	1	0	2	2	+0	2	1	1	0	3	2	+1	50.00	2024–25	2025–26
**Wellington Phoenix**	2	2	0	0	8	2	+6	2	2	0	0	4	1	+3	4	4	0	0	12	3	+9	100.00	2024–25	2025–26
**Western Sydney Wanderers**	2	1	1	0	2	1	+0	1	1	0	0	1	0	+1	3	2	1	0	3	1	+2	66.67	2024–25	2025–26
Western United	1	0	0	1	0	4	−4	2	1	0	1	4	4	+0	3	1	0	2	4	8	−4	33.33	2024–25	
Total	16	10	5	1	30	16	+14	13	7	4	2	24	14	+10	**29**	**17**	**9**	**3**	**53**	**29**	**+24**	**58.62**	2024–25	2025–26

Games held at neutral venues
Result	Season	Note
Macarthur FC 0–1 Auckland FC	2024–25	Unite Round
