= Gordon Pickard =

Australian businessman (born 1942)

- Born: England

Gordon Pickard (born 1942) is a real estate developer and philanthropist and considered one of the richest businesspeople from the state of South Australia.

Pickard emigrated from England as a child. Since 1967, he has been forming companies which now make up South Australia's largest housing and land development group. Recently the Pickard Foundation has been established to manage the large amount of donations to charities.

Pickard also played a crucial role in creating the football (soccer) club Adelaide United to compete in the National Soccer League and then the Hyundai A-League in 2003 and 2005 respectively. He served as Chairman. In February 2010 Pickard met with the Port Adelaide Magpies and is likely to allow it to continue to play in the South Australian National Football League. He had previously financially assisted the Port Adelaide AFL club as well.

In recognition of his role and efforts in founding Adelaide United, the northern end of Hindmarsh Stadium is named the Pickard End.
