= Brody Burkitt =

Australian soccer player

Personal information
- Full name: Brody Burkitt
- Date of birth: 13 March 2006 (age 20)
- Height: 1.78 m (5 ft 10 in)
- Position: Forward

Team information
- Current team: Adelaide United
- Number: 35

Youth career
- Seaford Rangers
- Adelaide City

Senior career*
Years	Team	Apps	(Gls)
2023–2024	West Torrens Birkalla	13	(0)
2024–2025	Adelaide United NPL	18	(11)
2026–	Adelaide United	22	(5)
- * Club domestic league appearances and goals

Brody Burkitt (born 13 March 2006) is an Australian professional soccer player who plays as a forward for Adelaide United FC.

== Early life ==
Burkitt was born on 13 March 2006. He grew up in McLaren Vale, South Australia. He began his youth soccer career at Seaford Rangers. He grew up supporting Adelaide United, having attended games as a child where he met multiple of the team's players.

== Club career ==
In the 2025–26 season, Burkitt made his A-League Men debut with Adelaide United.

On 24 January 2026, in his second appearance for the club, Burkitt scored a hat-trick against Brisbane Roar after coming on as a substitute.

== Personal life ==
A resident of McLaren Vale (where he grew up), located just outside Adelaide in South Australia, Burkitt is picked up by teammate Ryan Kitto to go to and from training.
