= Julian Kwaaitaal =

Dutch soccer player (born 2005)

Personal information
- Full name: Julian Francis Kwaaitaal
- Date of birth: 22 June 2005 (age 21)
- Place of birth: Eindhoven, Netherlands
- Height: 1.74 m (5 ft 9 in)
- Position: Winger

Youth career
- –2019: FC Eindhoven
- 2019–2024: PSV Eindhoven

Senior career*
Years	Team	Apps	(Gls)
2023–2024	Jong PSV	15	(0)
2024–2026	Adelaide United	0	(0)
2024–2025	→ FC Eindhoven (loan)	22	(0)
- * Club domestic league appearances and goals as of 13 May 2025

Julian Francis Kwaaitaal (Dutch: [ˈjy.li.an ˈfrɑn.sɪs kʋaːi.taːl]; born 22 May 2005) is a Dutch association footballer who most recently played for A-League Men club Adelaide United.

== Career ==
Having come through the youth ranks at FC Eindhoven, and later on the famed PSV Eindhoven academy, Jong PSV. Kwaaitaal signed for A-League Men club Adelaide United on a 3-year contract as part of the new relationship between the Reds and PSV. However, as part of the deal, he was immediately loaned back out to his junior club FC Eindhoven until the conclusion of the 2024–25 Eerste Divisie.

In January 2026, Adelaide United parted ways with Kwaaitaal by mutual consent. His only senior appearance for the club came in the 2025 Australia Cup, when he came on in the 64th minute against Newcastle Jets.
