= Ajak Riak =

South Sudanese footballer (born 2000)

Personal information
- Full name: Ajak Chol Riak
- Date of birth: 12 December 2000 (age 25)
- Place of birth: Nairobi, Kenya
- Height: 1.92 m (6 ft 4 in)
- Position: Forward

Team information
- Current team: Adelaide United
- Number: 99

Youth career
- –2019: Bayswater City
- 2019–2020: Stirling Lions
- 2021: Olympic Kingsway
- 2021–2023: Inglewood United

Senior career*
Years	Team	Apps	(Gls)
2022	Bentleigh Greens	20	(7)
2023	South Melbourne	23	(10)
2023–2024	PSS Sleman	14	(5)
2024–2025	Sheriff Tiraspol	8	(2)
2025	AGMK	6	(0)
2026–	Adelaide United	6	(0)

International career^{‡}
2023–	South Sudan	14	(0)
- * Club domestic league appearances and goals as of 1 November 2026 ‡ National team caps and goals as of 29 March 2026

Ajak Chol Riak (born 12 December 2000) is a professional footballer who plays as a forward for A-League Men club Adelaide United. Born in Kenya and raised in Australia, he plays for the South Sudan national team.

== Club career ==
=== Australia ===
Riak was born in Nairobi, Kenya before his family immigrated to Australia when he was just a child. Playing for several clubs in the National Premier Leagues Western Australia youth divisions, Riak moved to Melbourne and signed with Bentleigh Greens, where he assisted the club to a Round of 16 spot in the 2022 Australia Cup, where despite Riak scoring a 86th minute consolation goal, they were knocked out 2–1 by A-League Men heavyweights Sydney FC.

Riak's strong performances for Bentleigh in both the Australia Cup, and the NPL Victoria saw former National Soccer League champions South Melbourne secure his signing for the 2023 season. After further strong performances for South Melbourne throughout the 2023 NPL season, Riak secured his first move overseas, and ultimately professional contract when he signed for PSS Sleman in 2023–24 Liga 1.

=== Indonesia ===
PSS Sleman announced Riak's signing in late November 2023, as a replacement for Ukrainian striker Yevhen Bokhashvili who had departed to sign for Sriwijaya. His signing came alongside fellow African Australian Elvis Kamsoba who had recently been released from Iranian club Sepahan. Riak's debut came in a 2–1 victory against Barito Putera, where Riak was praised highly for his performance.

=== Moldova ===
On 11 June 2024, Sheriff Tiraspol announced the signing of Riak from PSS Sleman.

== International career ==
Riak accepted a call up from South Sudan under manager Stefano Cusin, making his full international debut against Congo in the 2023 Africa Cup of Nations qualification.

== Career statistics ==
=== Club ===
As of 23 November 2024

Appearances and goals by club, season and competition
Club	Season	League			National Cup		Continental		Other		Total	
Club	Season	Division	Apps	Goals	Apps	Goals	Apps	Goals	Apps	Goals	Apps	Goals
Bentleigh Greens	2022	NPL Victoria	20	7	2 (Note: Appearance in Australia Cup)	1	–		0	0	22	8
South Melbourne	2023	NPL Victoria	23	10	0	0	–		0	0	23	10
PSS Sleman	2023–24	Liga 1	14	5	–		–		0	0	14	5
Sheriff Tiraspol	2024–25	Moldovan Super Liga	8	2	–		4 (Note: Three appearances in UEFA Europa League, one appearance in UEFA Conference League)	0	–		12	2
Career total			65	24	2	1	4	0	0	0	71	25

=== International ===
As of match played 5 September 2024

South Sudan
Year	Apps	Goals
2023	8	0
2024	2	0
Total	10	0

== Style of play ==
Riak has been described as quick and strong player, especially during aerial duels courtesy of his height. In addition, he does possess a powerful finish.
