= Joshua Smits =

Dutch footballer (born 1992)

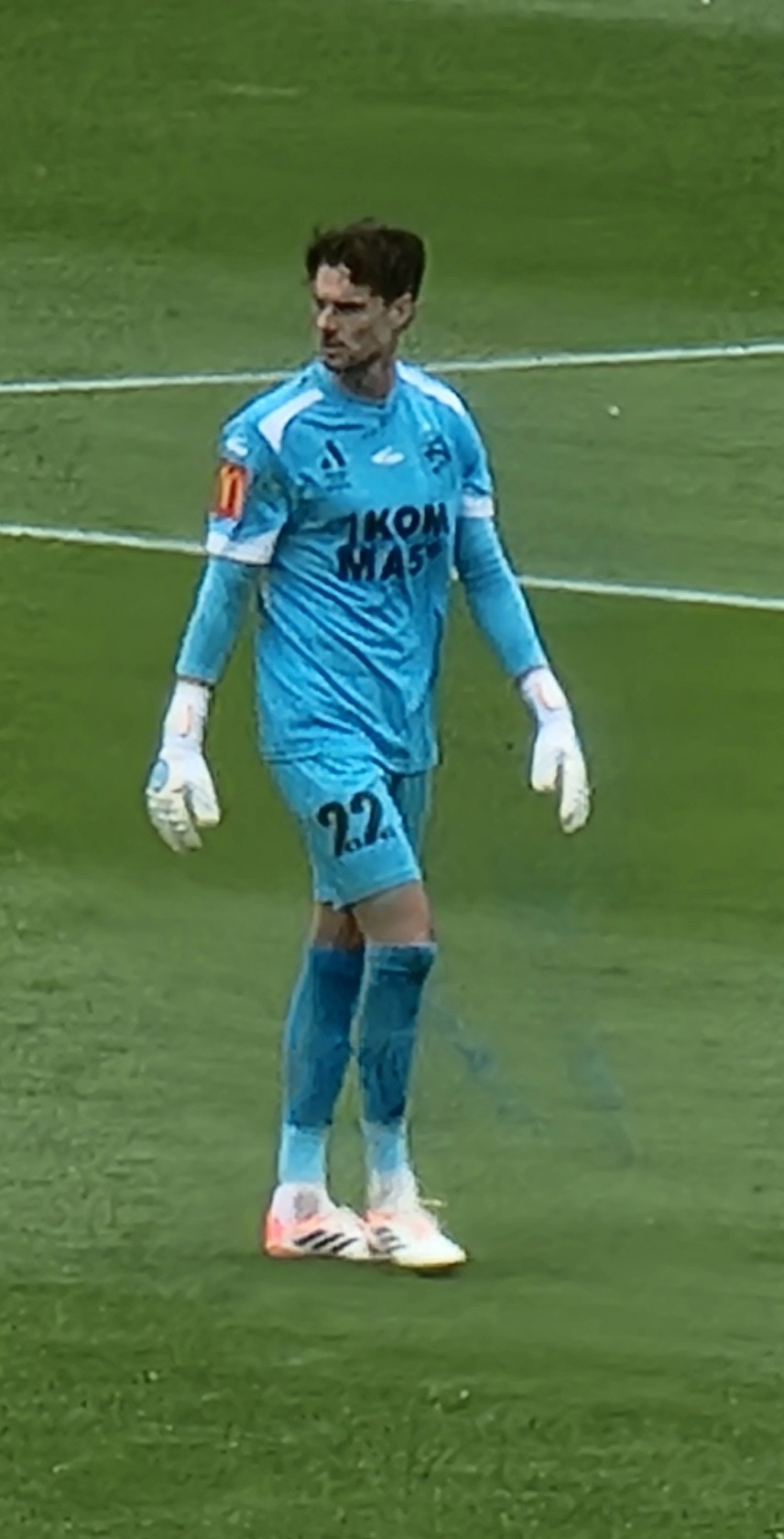
- Smits playing for Adelaide United in 2026.

Personal information
- Full name: Joshua Gerardus Petrus Wilhelmus Smits
- Date of birth: 6 November 1992 (age 34)
- Place of birth: Nijmegen, Netherlands
- Height: 1.90 m (6 ft 3 in)
- Position: Goalkeeper

Team information
- Current team: Adelaide United
- Number: 22

Youth career
- 1998–2003: Astrantia
- 2003–2011: De Treffers

Senior career*
Years	Team	Apps	(Gls)
2011–2018	NEC	41	(0)
2013	→ FC Oss (loan)	0	(0)
2018–2020	Almere City	29	(0)
2020–2022	Bodø/Glimt	11	(0)
2022–2024	Willem II	49	(0)
2024–2025	De Graafschap	25	(0)
2025–	Adelaide United	26	(0)
- * Club domestic league appearances and goals as of 21 February 2026

Joshua Gerardus Petrus Wilhelmus Smits (Dutch: [ˈjɔs.ɦua ɣeːˈrɑr.dʏs ˈpeː.trʏs ʋɪlˈɦɛl.mʏs smɪts]; born 6 November 1992) is a Dutch professional footballer who plays as a goalkeeper for Adelaide United.

Smits started his football career at Astrantia and De Treffers, before moving to NEC in 2011. In the 2014–15 season, he made his debut in professional football for NEC, a club with which he reached promotion to the Eredivisie. After a two-year stint with Almere City, he joined Norwegian club Bodø/Glimt, winning the league title in his first season at the club.

== Career ==
=== Early career ===
Smits started in the youth department of Astrantia SV in Middelaar as a five-year-old, first as an outfielder and from the age of 10 as a goalkeeper. He had already received goalkeeping practice at De Treffers, before he made the definitive move to the club's youth department at age 11. In the 2010–11 season, he played for the U17 team and was also the third goalkeeper for the first team. Due to an accident by the starting goalkeeper of De Treffers, Smits was on the bench in the Topklasse for a few matches.

=== NEC ===
In the summer of 2011, Smits was signed by NEC and was added to the first team as the third goalkeeper in September of that year after the departure of Jasper Cillessen. He initially played for the reserve team of Jong NEC/FC Oss. In April 2012, he sat on the bench of FC Oss for the home game against MVV behind Vincent van Trier. In January 2013, NEC signed Kalle Johnsson actively demoting Smits to fourth goalkeeper on the depth chart. He finished the season on loan at cooperation club FC Oss, where starter Luuk Koopmans had become injured. Smits, however, did not play and was reserve behind Richard Arends. He made his professional debut on 10 August 2014 against FC Eindhoven, in which NEC booked a 3–1 win. He was the starting goalkeeper of NEC in the 2014–15 season and was part of the team winning the league title. Three games before the end of the competition, it turned out that Smits had suffered a broken wrist and walked around with it for a long time. Smits had to miss the entire season after the club's comeback to the Eredivisie. In the 2016–17 season, Smits was fit again, but was kept out of the starting lineup by starter Joris Delle. On 28 May 2017, he was relegated with NEC back to the Eerste Divisie. That season, Smits became the starter again and he was in the pecking order above Delle. He started the first league match against Almere City, which NEC won 3–1.

=== Almere City ===
On 24 January 2018, Smits signed a contract for a season and a half with Almere City. He had an injury-riddled start with his new club, as he broke his arm in February 2018 and suffered a serious knee injury in August 2018. After Almere City had extended his contract for one year, Smits was finally able to make his debut for the club at the start of the 2019–20 season. He became the starting goalkeeper and in October 2019 his contract was extended until mid-2021.

=== Bodø/Glimt ===
On 12 June 2020, Smits signed a four-year contract with Norwegian club Bodø/Glimt playing in the top-tier Eliteserien. Smits quickly obtained the starting job, but did not return as a starter after another injury. In November 2020, Smits won the Eliteserien title with Bodø/Glimt; it was the club's first league title.

=== Willem II ===
On 25 June 2022, Smits signed a three-year contract with Willem II.

=== De Graafschap ===
On 23 August 2024, Smits moved to De Graafschap. He established himself as the club's starting goalkeeper before sustaining a knee injury in a match against Jong PSV on 28 February 2025, which ruled him out for the remainder of the season.

=== Adelaide United ===
On 18 August 2025, Smits moved to Australian club Adelaide United.

== Career statistics ==
=== Club ===
As of match played 28 February 2025

Appearances and goals by club, season and competition
Club	Season	League			National cup		Europe		Other		Total	
Club	Season	Division	Apps	Goals	Apps	Goals	Apps	Goals	Apps	Goals	Apps	Goals
NEC	2014–15	Eerste Divisie	35	0	3	0	—		—		38	0
NEC	2015–16	Eredivisie	0	0	0	0	—		—		0	0
NEC	2016–17	Eredivisie	0	0	0	0	—		—		0	0
NEC	2017–18	Eerste Divisie	6	0	1	0	—		—		7	0
NEC	Total		41	0	4	0	—		—		45	0
Almere City	2017–18	Eerste Divisie	0	0	0	0	—		—		0	0
Almere City	2018–19	Eerste Divisie	0	0	0	0	—		—		0	0
Almere City	2019–20	Eerste Divisie	29	0	0	0	—		—		29	0
Almere City	Total		29	0	0	0	—		—		29	0
Bodø/Glimt	2020	Eliteserien	10	0	0	0	—		—		10	0
Bodø/Glimt	2021	Eliteserien	1	0	2	0	—		—		3	0
Bodø/Glimt	2022	Eliteserien	0	0	1	0	1 (Note: Appearance in the UEFA Europa Conference League)	0	—		2	0
Bodø/Glimt	Total		11	0	3	0	1	0	—		15	0
Willem II	2022–23	Eerste Divisie	11	0	1	0	—		2 (Note: Appearances in the Eerste Divisie promotion play-offs)	0	14	0
Willem II	2023–24	Eerste Divisie	38	0	0	0	—		—		38	0
Willem II	Total		49	0	1	0	—		2	0	52	0
De Graafschap	2024–25	Eerste Divisie	25	0	1	0	—		0	0	26	0
Career total			155	0	9	0	1	0	2	0	167	0

== Honours ==
NEC

- Eerste Divisie: 2014–15

Bodø/Glimt

- Eliteserien: 2020, 2021
