= Airton Andrioli =

Brazilian footballer and coach

Personal information
- Date of birth: 22 February 1965 (age 61)
- Place of birth: Brazil
- Position: Midfielder

Team information
- Current team: Adelaide United

Senior career*
Years	Team	Apps	(Gls)
1989	AA Cabofriense		
1994–1996	West Adelaide	40	(3)

Managerial career
- 2005–2010: Solomon Islands
- 2013: Australia (beach soccer)
- 2020–2025: Adelaide United Youth
- 2025–: Adelaide United
- * Club domestic league appearances and goals

Airton Andrioli (Brazilian Portuguese: [ˈajʁtõ ɐ̃dʁiˈoli]; born 22 February 1965) is a Brazilian professional football player and coach who is the head coach for Adelaide United. He was previously the head of youth football and assistant coach for the A-League club.

== Career ==
Andrioli played for West Adelaide in the Australian National Soccer League.

Until June 2004 he coached W-League club Canberra United FC. Since August 2005 until February 2010 he was a head coach of the Solomon Islands national football team. Since February 2010 he worked as FFSA Technical Director. Since 2013 he coached the Australia national beach soccer team.

After the appointment of Carl Veart as Adelaide United's new interim head coach, Andrioli was appointed as his assistant for the remainder of the 2019–20 A-League season after it was resumed following the COVID-19 pandemic in Australia. On 13 November 2020, the club announced that Andrioli would remain as Veart's assistant going into the 2020–21 A-League season and was also announced as the club's Head of Youth Football.

Andrioli was promoted to head coach of Adelaide United ahead of the 2025–26 A-League Men season, following the departure of Carl Veart.

== Managerial statistics ==
As of 3 January 2026

Managerial record by team and tenure
Team	From	To	Record				
Team	From	To	P	W	D	L	Win %
Adelaide United FC	May 2025	Present	11	5	0	6	45.45
Total			11	5	0	6	45.45
