= Adelaide United FC =

Australian professional soccer club in South Australia

Adelaide United
- Full name: Adelaide United Football Club
- Nickname: The Reds
- Founded: 12 September 2003; 23 years ago
- Stadium: Coopers Stadium
- Capacity: 16,500
- Chairman: Cor Adriaanse
- Head coach: Airton Andrioli
- League: A-League Men
- 2025–26: 2nd of 12; Finals: Semi-finals
- Website: adelaideunited.com.au
| Home colours | Away colours |

Adelaide United Football Club is a professional men's football club located in Adelaide, South Australia. The club was one of the eight founding members of the A-League Men and have competed in it concurrently since its formation, under licence from the Australian Professional Leagues.

Established in 2003, the club was formed to compete in the final season of the National Soccer League after the withdrawals of West Adelaide and Adelaide City, in 1999 and 2003 respectively, left South Australia without representation in the competition. Since its formation, it has remained the only professional football club from South Australia. Adelaide United's home ground is at Coopers Stadium in the inner north-western suburb of Hindmarsh. Adelaide United won their first silverware in 2006, when they became premiers of the inaugural A-League season, finishing top of the ladder over Sydney FC by seven points. In 2008, the club became the first Australian side to reach the final of the AFC Champions League, being defeated by Gamba Osaka 0–5 across two legs and finishing in fifth place in the 2008 Club World Cup. The club won the first edition of the FFA Cup in 2014 with a 1–0 win at home over Perth Glory. Their first A-League title would come in 2016, defeating Western Sydney Wanderers 3–1 at Adelaide Oval in front of 50,119 spectators, the largest home crowd the club has played a competitive match in front of. Adelaide would become the first club to win back-to-back FFA Cups, defeating Sydney FC 2–1 in 2018 and Melbourne City 4–1 in 2019. The club remains the most successful team to ever play in the competition.

Adelaide United has a rivalry with Melbourne Victory, stemming from numerous altercations between players and coaches, as well as the two clubs' competitiveness in the early seasons of the A-League, culminating with Grand Final clashes in 2007 and 2009, both of which went the way of Victory. Adelaide United formerly held the record for the largest winning margin in an A-League Men match, having defeated North Queensland Fury 8–1 at home on 21 January 2011. The game was also the first and only instance where two players from the same team, Marcos Flores and Sergio van Dijk, achieved hat-tricks in a single match. They later matched their own record when they beat Newcastle Jets 7–0 at home almost exactly four years later.

Described as having a "production line" of young local talent, Adelaide United has grown a reputation of developing young players and selling them to overseas clubs. Notable examples include Nestory Irankunda's sale to Bayern Munich for a league record fee, Archie Goodwin, Joe Gauci, Musa Toure, Steven Hall, and Riley McGree, all on transfer fees. They've also facilitated moves overseas for Louis D'Arrigo and Mohamed Toure. According to the International Centre for Sports Studies, in 2024, the club ranked 43rd in the world and second in the AFC for minutes given to under-21 players.

== History ==
=== 2003–2005: Beginnings ===
In August 2003, Adelaide City withdrew from the National Soccer League (NSL), leaving Adelaide with no NSL presence for the first time since the league's inception in 1977. West Adelaide had previously withdrawn from the NSL in 1999. In response, Adelaide United was created on 12 September 2003, with real estate businessman Gordon Pickard funding the new club and former Soccer Australia and FIFA executive Basil Scarsella as chairman.

On 13 September, former Brisbane Strikers and Newcastle Breakers manager John Kosmina was officially announced as the manager. Within a few weeks, a team was assembled, mostly with the remnants of the Adelaide City squad to compete in the clubs inaugural season. On 17 October 2003, Adelaide United won its first NSL match against Brisbane Strikers, with a score of 1–0.

After a successfulhome-and-away season, including an unbeaten seven-match streak during November and December 2003, Adelaide United reached the NSL preliminary final, ultimately losing to Perth Glory. The NSL concluded at the end of the 2003–04 season after 28 seasons, with The Reds only participating in the final season. The governing body, Australian Soccer Association (later Football Federation Australia), shut down the league in preparation for the launch of the fully professional A-League almost 12 months later, on 26 August 2005.

=== 2005–2010: Early days in the A-League ===
Adelaide United was announced as one of eight teams to compete in the first season of the A-League, and along with the Perth Glory and Newcastle Jets, one of only three teams to survive from the National Soccer League's last season. United began preparation earlier than most of the other clubs and had announced two-thirds of the 20-man squad before February 2005.

The club focused on bringing several Adelaide-born players back to South Australia, such as Angelo Costanzo, Travis Dodd, and Lucas Pantelis, who had previously played for Adelaide City SC in the NSL. Shengqing Qu was signed by Chinese club Shanghai Shenhua as the club's "marquee" signing (a ruling allowing each club to pay one player outside the salary cap) in March 2005.

Aurelio Vidmar announced his retirement before the A-League had even started. He was replaced before the fifth round by striker Fernando from Brazil, a former 'player of the year' in the old NSL. By moving to Adelaide, he was reunited with former coach John Kosmina who introduced him to Australian audiences at the Brisbane Strikers.

Adelaide United Director Mel Patzwald established links with American club Miami FC, setting up a 'sister club' relationship—the first of its kind for an A-League club—with whom they played a number of friendlies and leading to the signings of several players. The club signed Diego Walsh and later Brazilian legend Romário for a five-game guest stint in November/December 2006. Cassio then signed with Adelaide and the club won the 2008 AFC Champions League and played in the 2008 FIFA Club World Cup, where they finished fifth. Patzwald also created a sister club relationship with the then Asian Champions Shandong Luneng which was an integral part of the state government's ties with Shandong Province in a mutually beneficial partnership. Education SA in particular was a beneficiary with thousands of students from Shandong Province choosing Adelaide as their preferred location to study. Adelaide's youth team was invited to participate in the Weifang Cup as a result of the relationship.

Adelaide United finished as premiers in the inaugural season of the Hyundai A-League. However they lost to Sydney FC in the two-leg semi-final and then Central Coast Mariners 1–0 in the preliminary final at Hindmarsh.

Adelaide United started the season well by winning the A-League Pre-Season Challenge Cup, beating reigning champions Central Coast Mariners 5–4 on penalties after 1–1 at the end of extra time. In the premiership season, they finished runners-up to Melbourne Victory. After a successful finals campaign, they advanced to the 2006–07 Grand Final, after winning 4–3 on penalties (1–1 AET) against the Newcastle Jets. Adelaide United played Melbourne Victory at the Telstra Dome in the Grand Final on 18 February 2007 losing 6–0. Coach John Kosmina was sacked the following wee owing to the poor performance at the grand final as well as for alleged abuse of two Channel 10 reporters.

The 2006–07 season also saw Brazilian international player Romário join the club for a four-game guest player stint.

Adelaide United was selected, along with Sydney FC, as the first Australian representative to play in the 2007 AFC Champions League. They received their Asian berth as A-League premiers. Adelaide was drawn into Group G with Chinese champion Shandong Luneng Taishan, Korean champions Seongnam Ilhwa Chunma and Vietnamese league and Super Cup champions Gach Dong Tam Long An. Adelaide finished 3rd in its group.

The Reds launched into the season by winning the A-League Pre-Season Challenge Cup, beating Perth Glory 2–1 at Hindmarsh Stadium. The club finished 6th place in the A-League, missing out on a final place as they concentrated their energies on maintaining a successful AFC Champions League campaign.

Adelaide United participated in the 2008 AFC Champions League after finishing runner-up in the 2006–07 regular season and finals series to Melbourne Victory. Adelaide was drawn into Group E, along with V-League and Super Cup winners Bình Dương, CSL champions Changchun Yatai, and K-League winners Pohang Steelers.

Adelaide became the first Australian team to progress to the semi-finals of the AFC Champions League. Adelaide drew 2007 Uzbek League Runners-up Bunyodkor in the semi-final after the Uzbeks knocked out Saipa in their quarter-final. In the first leg of the semi-final, Adelaide won 3–0 with Diego, Barbiero, and Cristiano scoring (via a penalty). The match was witnessed by 16,998 fans at Hindmarsh Stadium. In the second leg of the semi-finals, Adelaide United lost 1–0 to FC Bunyodkor but went through to the final 3–1 on aggregate.

In the two-legged final, they took on Japanese team Gamba Osaka who deposed 2007 champions Urawa Red Diamonds in the other semi-final. Adelaide lost heavily over two legs to Gamba Osaka. The score was 3–0 to Gamba Osaka away and 2–0 to Osaka at home in Adelaide, the Japanese club winning 5–0 on aggregate.

This result ensured that Adelaide would participate in the 2008 FIFA Club World Cup either as the AFC representative or as the highest-placed non-Japanese team – as the rules do not allow more than one Japanese team to participate.

The off-season saw the departure of Socceroo Bruce Djite and Nathan Burns. By the end of round 27, Adelaide had drawn level for first, equalling Melbourne's 38 points on the ladder. Needing to win 2–0 against the Central Coast Mariners away to win the premiership, The Reds only managed to secure a 1–0 win. Adelaide was pushed down to second because of the goal difference. The Reds, along with Melbourne Victory, Queensland Roar, and Central Coast Mariners, proceeded to the finals. In the Grand Final at Etihad Stadium in Melbourne, Adelaide United lost 1–0 to Melbourne Victory. The match was marred by the controversial 10th-minute sending off of Cristiano which ultimately contributed to the loss.

An early highlight for the season was Adelaide's run to the final of the AFC Champions League against Gamba Osaka. Gamba Osaka entered the FIFA Club World Cup as the winner of the AFC Champion's League, freeing up the tournament's Japanese host position; Adelaide United, as runners-up of the AFC Champion's League, filled this position. Their first match was a play-off against 2007–08 OFC Champions League champions Waitakere United from New Zealand. The Reds defeated Waitakere 2–1 via two set plays from Paul Reid to secure a rematch with ACL rivals Gamba Osaka on 14 December – the third meeting between the two sides in three weeks. The Reds fought valiantly and created many opportunities, in particular Travis Dodd, but lost 0–1 after a 23rd minute shot by Gamba midfielder, Yasuhito Endō. On 18 December, Adelaide played in the fifth-place play-off match against Egyptian club Al Ahly SC, defeating them 1–0 to be rewarded the fifth-place prize of US$1.5 million. Adelaide United were awarded the Fair Play award upon the completion of the tournament, and Cristiano's goal in the fifth-place play-off was selected as goal of the tournament.

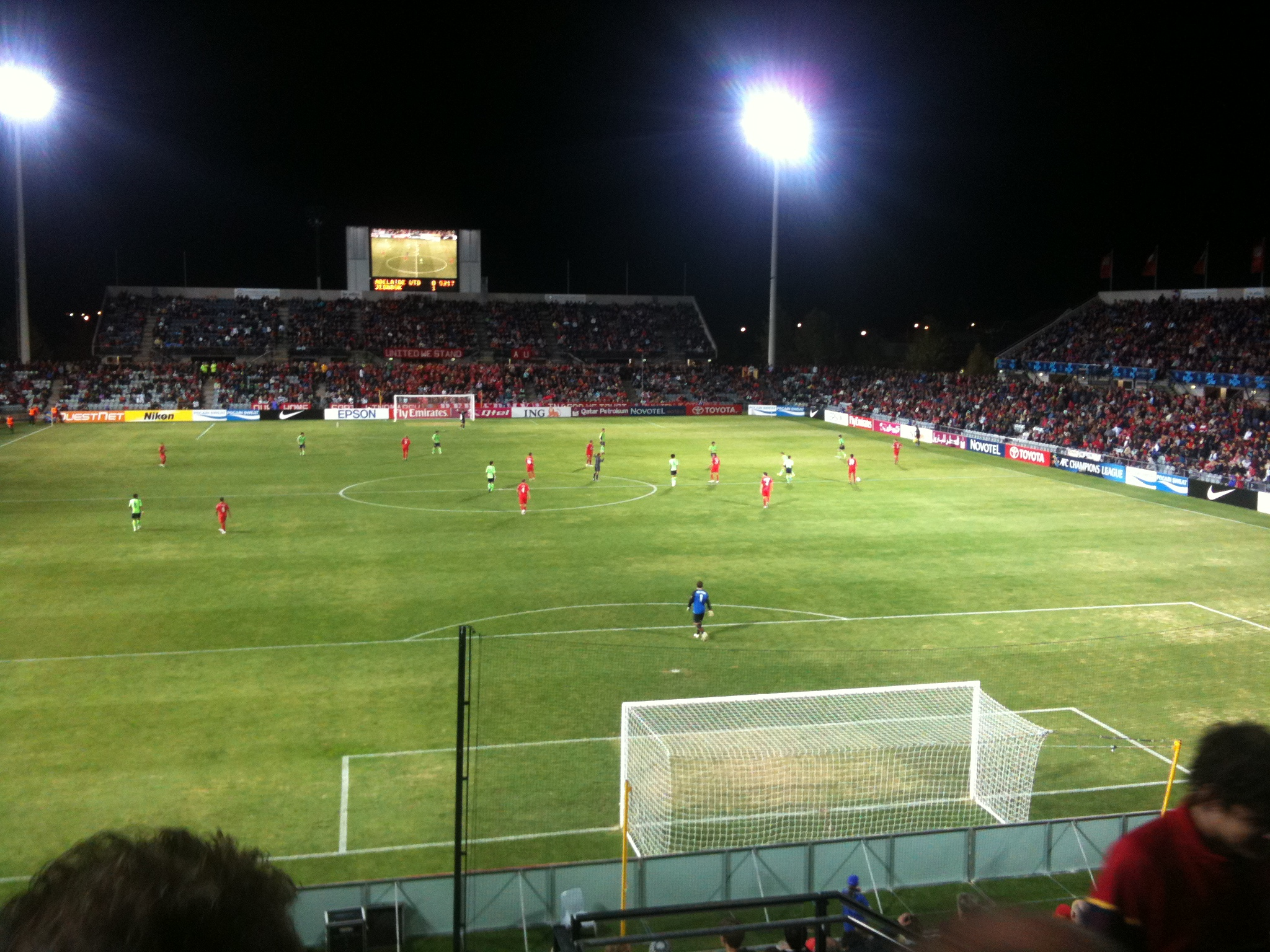
Adelaide United playing against Jeonbuk Hyundai Motors in the AFC Champions League in 2010.

After a stellar season in the A-League and internationally, Adelaide United began its pre-season without a financial owner; Nick Bianco relinquished his A-League license back to Football Federation Australia (FFA). Regardless of this situation, the FFA ensured that Adelaide would have the funds available to recruit in the off-season and to maintain the club, whilst they would negotiate the new ownership deals. This, however, was still not enough to lift the club up from its 2009–10 wooden spoon status – the club's worst performing season in its short history.

Adelaide competed in the ACL Champions League in 2010 after finishing second on the 2008–09 A-League league table, and runner-up in the Finals series to cross-border rivals, Melbourne Victory. Adelaide were drawn into Group H alongside 2009 Asian Champions Pohang Steelers, Chinese sister club Shandong Luneng and Sanfrecce Hiroshima. Adelaide United managed to hold on to the top spot of Group H, resulting in a home match in Round 16. In an exciting, nerve-racking match, Adelaide lost to Jeonbuk Motors 3–2. Adelaide came back twice in the game, including a goal in the final seconds of the match. Jeonbuk won the match with a goal in the second half of extra time.

=== 2010–2018: Bottom to top and first A League championship ===
For the first time in the club's history, Adelaide United was led by an international manager in Rini Coolen, moving away from the Adelaide United tradition of local coaches seen in its prior seasons.

As of 9 September 2010, Adelaide United had made Australian soccer history by becoming the first team to climb from the bottom of the table to the top, whilst the 2009–10 premiers and champions, Sydney FC, remained rooted at the bottom. Adelaide United also claimed the record for longest undefeated streak in A-League history with their win over Wellington Phoenix in Week 11 of the league, consisting of thirteen games stretching back to the penultimate round of the 2009–10 A-League season. This surpassed Central Coast Mariners's previous record of twelve games undefeated set back in the 2005–06 A-League season. Unfortunately for Adelaide United, Brisbane Roar surpassed this newly set record, when the Roar comprehensively won their Week 16 fixture against Central Coast Mariners at Bluetongue Stadium.

Following 18 months under Football Federation Australia (FFA) financial administration, it was announced on 8 November 2010 that a South Australian consortium had taken over ownership of the club with a ten-year licence. New co-owner Greg Griffin steps in as chairman of the club replacing Mel Patzwald, whilst ex-North Adelaide Football Club CEO, Glenn Elliott replaces Sam Ciccarello, who now takes up a role at the FFA.

On 9 January 2011, Adelaide broke its longest winless streak against its rival club Melbourne Victory by posting a 4–1 away win in Melbourne at AAMI Park. Adelaide United then went on to make A-League history by recording the highest winning margin in the league's history with an 8–1 win over North Queensland Fury on 21 January 2011. This also marked the first time two players from the same side scored hat-tricks in one game (Sergio van Dijk and Marcos Flores), and matched the all-time highest match aggregate score of 9 goals scored in one match.

Adelaide finished the season by winning 2–1 at Adelaide Oval against Melbourne Victory in front of 21,038 spectators – the club's largest crowd of the season. This ensured the club third place in overall standings at the end of the season, and hosting rights for at least the first week of the knock-out Finals Series. Adelaide United went on to defeat Wellington Phoenix in the first week of the Finals under torrential rain but succumbed to Gold Coast United in the second week and were knocked out of the competition on the back of a 2–3 home loss.

Off-season transfers marked the departure of Captain Travis Dodd, long-serving players Lucas Pantelis and Robert Cornthwaite, and of fan favourites Mathew Leckie and Marcos Flores to overseas clubs. In a coup for the club and the A-League, Rini Coolen managed to secure the signatures of Socceroos Bruce Djite, Jon McKain and Dario Vidošić; with the latter being offered the Australian marquee player status at the club for the season.

On 18 December 2011, it was announced that head coach Rini Coolen had been sacked and replaced by former coach John Kosmina as caretaker coach for the rest of the season, including the AFC Champions League group stage of 2012. As part of Kosmina's takeover of the head coaching position, Eugene Galeković was named club captain on 28 December 2011, replacing Jon McKain.

Their fourth appearance in the competition – more times than any other Australian club – Adelaide qualified for the 2012 AFC Champions League playoff round by finishing third in the 2010–11 A-League. They were placed in Group E, quickly dubbed the 'Group of Death' by numerous commentators, alongside Bunyodkor, Gamba Osaka and Pohang Steelers. Adelaide qualified through to the Round of 16 for a third time and then went on to qualify for the quarter-finals with a 1–0 win at home against Nagoya Grampus.

Adelaide faced Bunyodkor in the quarter-finals. Adelaide surrendered a 2–0 lead at home, with Bunyodkor clawing back to end 2–2. The return leg in Tashkent was again locked at 2–2 after 90 minutes of play, requiring the game to go to extra time and possible penalties thereafter. Despite an Iain Ramsay goal in the third minute to give Adelaide the lead, Bunyodkor eventually eliminated Adelaide by scoring in added extra time. Adelaide ended the match with nine men, having Iain Fyfe and Fabian Barbiero both sent off after receiving two yellow cards.

Adelaide United's 2012–13 season was John Kosmina's first full season as a permanent coach since being appointed in a caretaker role from Rini Coolen in December 2011. The season was also Kosmina's first in charge at Adelaide since the 2006–07 season. John Kosmina had expressed his desire to the club for a two-year extension to his contract, but rumours publicly emerged of assistant coach Michael Valkanis being offered a contract extension, but not Kosmina. The coach resigned shortly thereafter. Valkanis was appointed as interim coach until the end of the season, with former Adelaide City player Sergio Melta being appointed as his assistant.

The Reds finished the A-League season fourth but were knocked out of Championship contention by Brisbane Roar 2–1 in an elimination final.

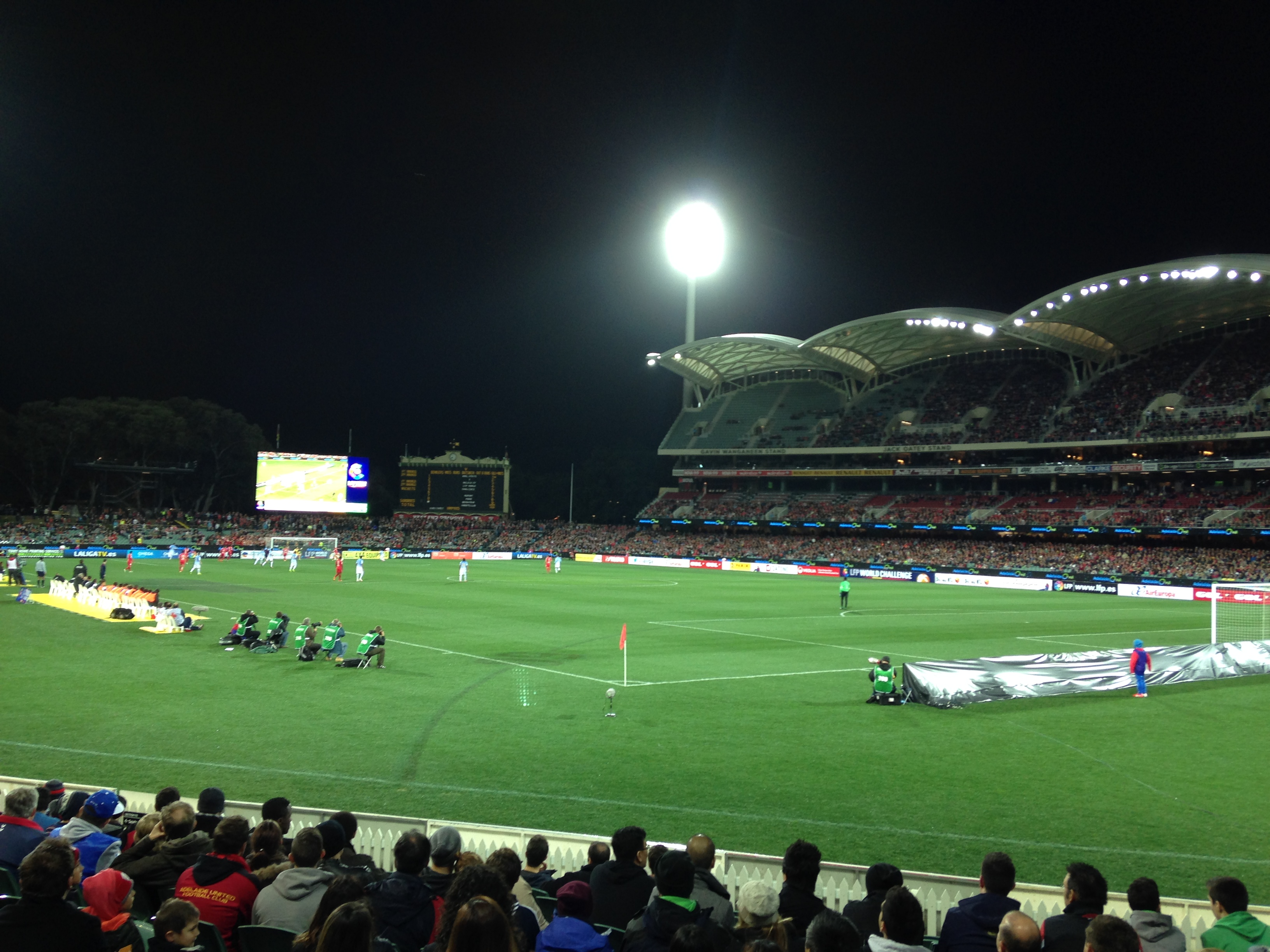
Adelaide United playing against Málaga in a friendly in 2014.

On 30 April 2013, Josep Gombau signed a two-season deal as coach, arriving at the club in July 2013. In the winter transfer window, Gombau was quick to add Spanish flavour into the squad. His first two signings were compatriots and Barcelona youth products Sergio Cirio and Isaías Sánchez. Gombau also brought his long-time assistant coach Pau Marti to work alongside existing assistant coach Michael Valkanis. He also added other players including Tarek Elrich and Steven Lustica, Michael Zullo for a season-long loan and Brent McGrath as a four-week injury replacement player. Awer Mabil and Jordan Elsey were also promoted from the youth system, each rewarded with two-year contracts. Sergio van Dijk was transferred to Persib Bandung and Dario Vidošić to Sion for a reported $700,000 transfer fee.

The Reds had a shaky start to their season under new manager Gombau. They had only a single win in their first nine games for the season and early calls started for the club to show the door to the new man in charge. Gombau quickly changed the club's fortunes, getting his second win in round 10 against the Central Coast Mariners, with a 4–0 result. The team continued this form to finish sixth on the table after the 27 home-and-away games, which let them into the finals by two points. Adelaide's season was ended by Central Coast in the elimination final, losing 1–0.

The Reds' highest attendance in the 2013–14 season was 16,504 in the round 2 clash with Melbourne Victory at Hindmarsh Stadium which ended in a 2–2 draw.

Carrying over from the previous season, Josep Gombau was quick to implement a possession-based football style at Adelaide, all the way from the grassroots level of local soccer to the senior side. Gombau further reinforced his dogmatic approach by bringing in FC Barcelona legend Guillermo Amor as the club's technical director. While winning the Adelaide fans over, Josep elevated the technical and tactical quality of the local brand, earning the respect and admiration of rival clubs, coaches, and the FFA, who unanimously voted him in as coach of the A-League All Stars team for the 2014 A-League All Stars Game against the visiting Juventus. Gombau's United won the inaugural FFA Cup with a 1–0 win against Perth Glory. Gombau left the club in July 2015 to take up a youth coaching role in the United States.

2016 A-League Grand Final starting lineup Adelaide United 3–1 Western Sydney Wanderers

Following the shock resignation of manager Josep Gombau who took up a youth coaching role in the United States shortly before the start of the season, Adelaide United announced Guillermo Amor as his replacement who was serving as the club's technical director and Jacobo Ramallo as his assistant who was in charge as director of Adelaide United's Football School. Eight rounds into the season, Adelaide was without a win leaving them sitting at the bottom of the ladder with only 3 points and 3 goals scored. However, Adelaide then won 13 of their next 18 games losing just once to finish top of the ladder and win the club's second Premier's Plate. Following a week off during which the Elimination Finals were played, Adelaide United defeated Melbourne City 4–1 in a Semi-final at Coopers Stadium to advance to the Grand Final where they would for the first time host the Grand Final at the Adelaide Oval.

In the Grand Final, the Reds finally won their first A-League championship, beating the Western Sydney Wanderers 3–1 in front of a crowd of 50,119.

Adelaide United were eliminated in the first round of the 2016 FFA Cup, suffering a stunning 2–1 loss to National Premier Leagues Queensland team Redlands United FC, with the match labelled the biggest upset in FFA Cup history. Adelaide United had to replace five players from its starting grand final team including Bruce Djite, Craig Goodwin, Pablo Sánchez, Stefan Mauk and Bruce Kamau, but they were replaced with youngsters Jesse Makarounas, Nikola Mileusnic, Ben Garuccio, Marc Marino, Jordan O'Doherty and Riley McGree, experienced pair Henrique and James Holland, and Spanish Striker Sergi Guardiola on loan and South Korean Danny Choi as an injury replacement.

Adelaide United were runners-up in the FFA Cup final against Sydney FC by a 2–1 scoreline. Marco Kurz then had his first A-League game against Wellington Phoenix by a 1–1 draw. Their top scorer was their new signing, Johan Absalonsen who scored 8 goals in all competitions this season. They finished 5th in the A-League, and then they lost in the elimination final against Melbourne Victory by a 2–1 scoreline with a crowd of 15,502.

=== 2018–present: Cup success and beyond ===
Adelaide United were the FFA Cup champions after defeating Sydney FC 2–1 in the final at Coopers Stadium. On March 19, 2019, the club announced they would not be renewing Marco Kurz' contract. United finished 4th in the regular season. Craig Goodwin was United's leading goalscorer scoring 15 goals across all competitions. The Reds hosted an elimination final against Melbourne City where they came out 1–0 victors with the goal coming from Ben Halloran in the 119th minute. Adelaide United were then eliminated in the semi-finals following a loss to Perth Glory on penalties after playing out a 3–3 draw.

In the 2019 FFA Cup Final, Adelaide defeated Melbourne City 4–0 at home, further increasing their claim to have the most FFA Cup titles with three.

Adelaide United continued to qualify for the A-League finals series in the following seasons, finishing 5th in the 2020–21 season, and 4th in the 2021–22 season, with Craig Goodwin returning to the squad on loan in 2021, before permanently signing with the club until 2025. During these seasons, Adelaide placed a large emphasis on bringing through young players from South Australia, and their NPL squad, notable examples during this period were Joe Gauci, who has since earned a cap for the national team, Bernardo, Mohamed Toure, Yaya Dukuly, Ethan Alagich, Asad Kasumovic, Jonny Yull and Nestory Irankunda.

On 4 April 2023, Chairman Piet van der Pol stepped down and was replaced by Ned Morris. The previously anonymous owners were also revealed, being Cor Adriaanse, Rob van Eck, and Yu Lidong.

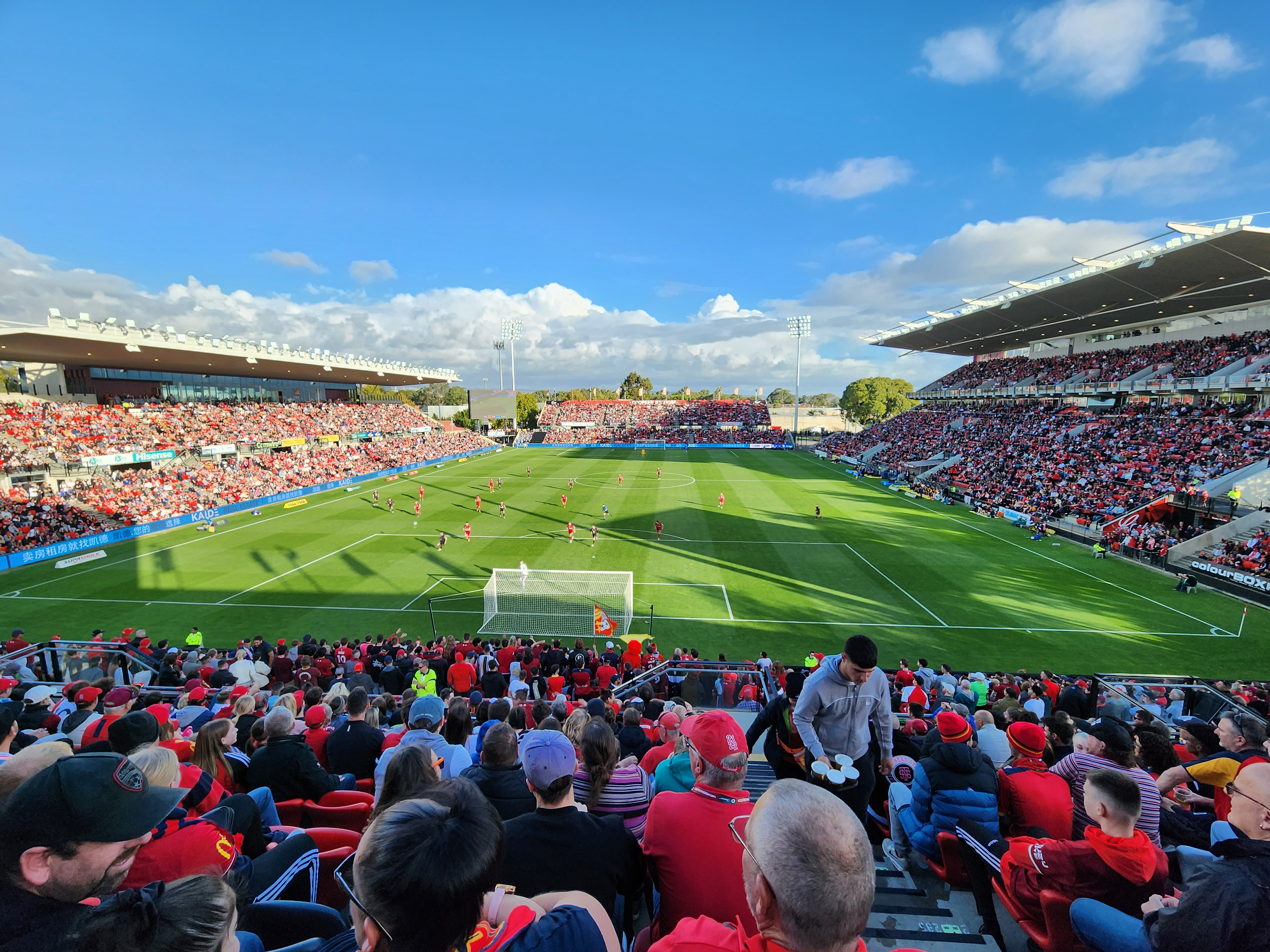
Adelaide United playing against Sydney FC in 2023.

In the 2022–23 season, Adelaide were challenging Melbourne City for the premiership, with many of their young players earning permanent spots in the squad. The eventual champions Central Coast Mariners made a run late in the season to bump Adelaide down to third on the table, and eventually knock Adelaide out of the championship race in a semi-final. Craig Goodwin, who had recently scored against France and Argentina in the 2022 World Cup, won the 2023 Johnny Warren Medal but returned to Al-Wehda FC in the winter of that year. Adelaide signed former Manchester United-listed midfielder Ryan Tunnicliffe in the off-season. Ryan Kitto was made the captain of the club with Goodwin's departure.

Adelaide's 2023–24 season began with massive success, beating the reigning Champions Central Coast Mariners and the Premiers Melbourne City with a combined score of 9–0. Highlights of these opening games include Joe Gauci's penalty save against Jamie Maclaren, a free kick goal from 17-year-old Nestory Irankunda, and a brace off the bench from Bernardo. On 14 November 2023, Adelaide United confirmed that they had agreed terms with Bayern Munich for the sale of 17-year-old winger, Nestory Irankunda, to join the club at the end of the season. The fee was officially undisclosed, however it was reported to be in the region of AUD$5.7 million plus add-ons, the largest fee ever received by an A-League club. Irankunda was later nominated for Australia's Young Footballer of the Year award, and became the first Australian to feature in Goal's NXGN. Despite valiant performances, Adelaide dropped to 8th on the A-League ladder with losses to Macarthur and Melbourne Victory. They revived their season with a home draw against Wellington and an away win against Sydney in the A-League's first Unite Round. The latter of these games included a hat-trick and an assist from Hiroshi Ibusuki. The Japanese striker's heroics placed Adelaide in 5th place mid-way through the season.

During the January transfer window, Adelaide lost numerous key players: Bernardo terminated his contract to sign for Macarthur FC, Steven Hall was signed by Brighton & Hove Albion's youth team, Alexandar Popovic was signed by Korean side Gwangju, and starting goalkeeper Joe Gauci signed for Aston Villa for an undisclosed fee. The second half of the season saw United drop towards the bottom of the ladder, going winless for seven consecutive matches, breaking their streak with a 1–0 win away to Newcastle Jets, and a first home win in three months against Western United thanks to a Nestory Irankunda hat-trick, who became the youngest hat-trick scorer in A-League history, and the second youngest in Australian national league history.

== Sponsors ==
Adelaide United's 2009–10 playing kit did not feature a sponsor on the front of their kit. Towards the end of the season, United signed a deal with Jim's Group which saw the Jim's Plumbing logo feature on the front of United's home and away kits. The deal only lasted for the remainder of the season as the logo was not displayed on Adelaide's home or away kits in the 2010–11 season.

On 16 December 2010, Coopers Brewery announced that their logo would feature on the front of the jersey for the remainder of the season, in a deal worth to be around $200,000.

As of 1 April 2011, all A-League clubs were able to negotiate new kit supplier deals as the previous contract with Reebok had elapsed and as such, Adelaide United negotiated a 3-year deal with Erreà.

On 2 March 2012, the club announced Legea as the official kit suppliers for their 2012 Asian Champions League campaign. Legea exclusively supplied all of the team's authentic on-field and off-field apparel for the club's 6 ACL group-stage matches.

On 16 September 2020, Adelaide United announced a partnership with Guangzhou-based sportswear manufacturer UCAN to manufacture and supply the club's playing, training, and travel wear. Since that same year, Flinders University feature on the front of the home kit, whilst Australian Outdoor Living feature on the front of the away kit.

== Crest ==
The Adelaide United badge, used from the club's foundation in 2003 to 2005

Adelaide United's original strip was made using the three South Australian state colours: red, blue and yellow. The shirt was mainly red with a large yellow stripe down both sleeves with blue being used for the short colour and the stripe running down each side of the top. The badge also uses the state colours in a stylised swoosh, above what appears to be a football made with the Southern Cross, as opposed to the traditional hexagonal panels of a football. The football is similar in appearance to that of the UEFA Champions League logo.

== Colours and badge ==
Reebok spikes first appeared on the first in 2007

Since their inception into the A-League, Adelaide United's kits, along with the rest of the league, have been manufactured by Reebok. United's kit has moved towards a predominately all-red kit, both top and shorts, with black trim. Originally, the away strip was predominantly white, with red sleeves and yellow trim however in 2009 the club launched a predominantly black 'clash' strip.

The launch of the new national league also saw Adelaide launch a new badge; while keeping a similar look and feel as its predecessor the new badge takes the form of a more traditional football badge with its shield-like border.

Adelaide United is most commonly referred to as "The Reds" because of their predominantly red playing kit. In February 2009 the club's head coach, Aurelio Vidmar, referred to the City of Adelaide as a "Pissant Town" after suffering a heartbreaking loss. The club's supporters eventually utilised the name "Pissants" as a term of endearment and it became an unofficial nickname of the club among its supporters.

=== Kit suppliers and shirt sponsors ===
| Years | Kit manufacturer | H&A Major sponsor(s) | Shirt sponsor (back) | ACL Major Sponsor |
|---|---|---|---|---|
| 2003–04 | Sekem | Fairmont Homes | Bianco | |
| 2005–06 | Reebok | Fairmont Homes | Bianco | |
| 2006–07 | Reebok | Sakai | Bianco | Scalzi Produce (2007) |
| 2007–08 | Reebok | Sakai | Club Financial | Sakai (2008) |
| 2008–09 | Reebok | Sakai, Bianco | StudyAdelaide, Sakai | |
| 2009–10 | Reebok | Jim's Plumbing, Modern Solar | Sakai | |
| 2010–11 | Reebok | Coopers Brewery | Stratco | |
| 2011–12 | Erreà | Coopers Brewery | | |
| 2012 | Legea | | | Covered sponsor |
| 2012–13 | Kappa | Unleash Solar | Unleash Solar | |
| 2013–16 | Kappa | Veolia | Do the NT | |
| 2016–17 | Macron | IGA | Datong | South Australia (2016) |
| 2017–18 | Macron | IGA | – | AusGold Mining Group (2017) |
| 2019–2020 | Macron | Flinders University; South Australia Tourism (away, 2020) | Starfish Developments; Kite (2021–2022); RAA (2023 Finals Series) | |
| 2020– | UCAN | Flinders University; Australian Outdoor Living (away) | Starfish Developments; Kite (2021–2022); RAA (2023 Finals Series) | |

=== AFC Competition Sponsorship ===
| Year | Kit Manufacturer | Shirt Sponsor |
|---|---|---|
| 2007 | Reebok | Scalzi Produce |
| 2008 | Reebok | Sakai |
| 2010 | Reebok | StudyAdelaide |
| 2012 | Kappa (qualifying play-off and round of 16); Legea (group stages) | Coopers Brewery (qualifying play-off); Covered sponsor (group stages); Unleash Solar (round of 16) |
| 2016 | Kappa | South Australia |
| 2017 | Macron | AusGold Mining Group |

== Stadium ==
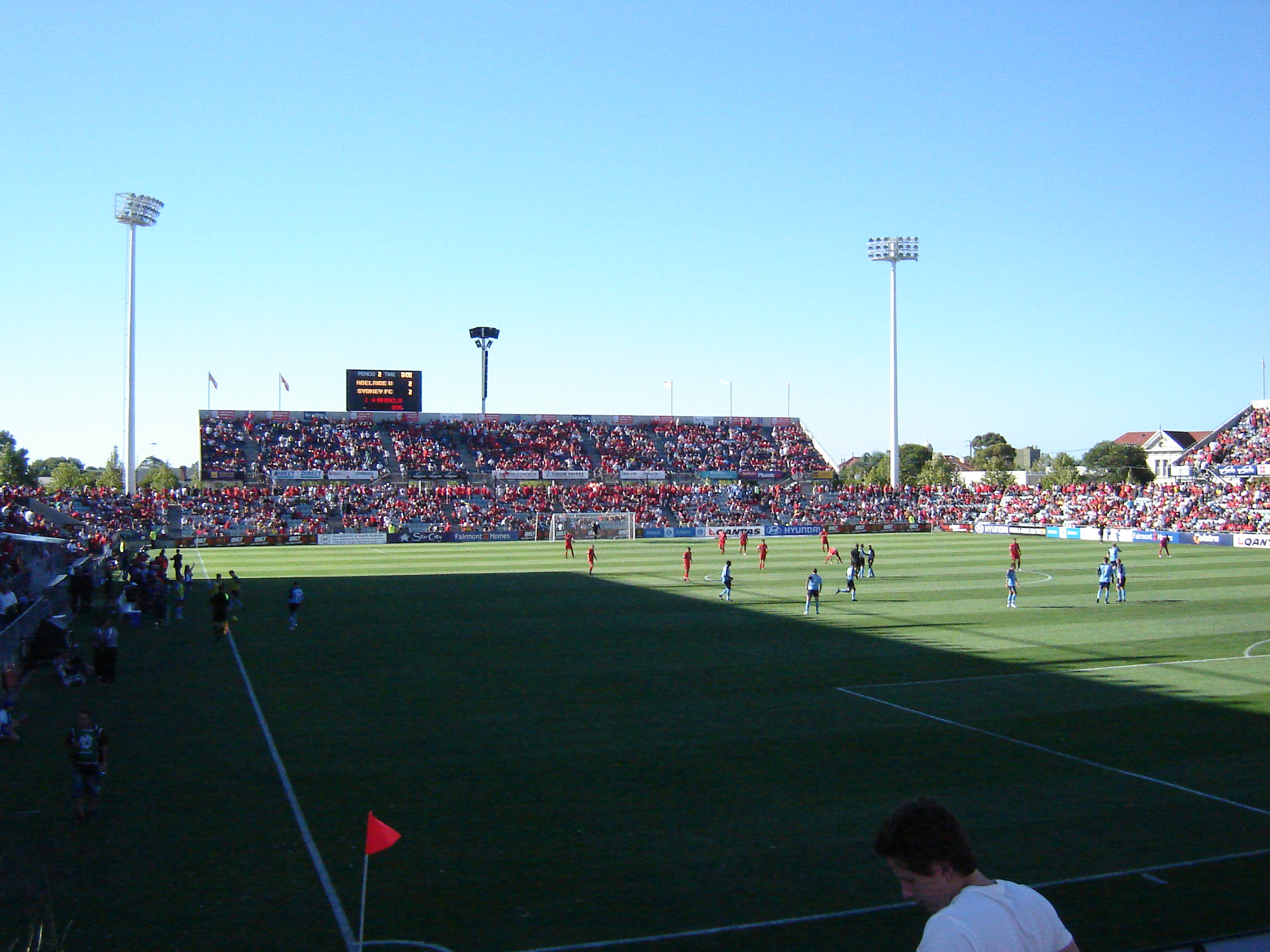
Hindmarsh Stadium, home ground of Adelaide United

Adelaide United play their home matches at Hindmarsh Stadium, currently known as Coopers Stadium. Previously, two games a year were played at Adelaide Oval, one against interstate rivals Melbourne Victory and traditional rivals Sydney FC. The second match in 2009 saw 23,002 people attend the game. Adelaide United played the 2016 Grand Final at Adelaide Oval and played early-stage cup games at the State Centre for Football in Gepps Cross, and Marden Sports Complex in Marden.

Hindmarsh Stadium seating capacity is 13,500. Adelaide United's first home game in the now-defunct National Soccer League saw over 15,000 supporters watch Adelaide win 1–0 over the Brisbane Strikers.

A-League crowds have averaged 10,947 in 2005–06 and over 12,000 supporters attending in both 2006–07 and 2007–08 seasons. Even with a lack of on-field success, crowds at United's games remained healthy during the 2009–10 season relative to other clubs, largely due to the club's strong community-based initiatives. The record attendance for Hindmarsh Stadium was a full house of 17,000 on 12 November 2008 against Gamba Osaka in the historic second leg of the ACL final.

== Support ==
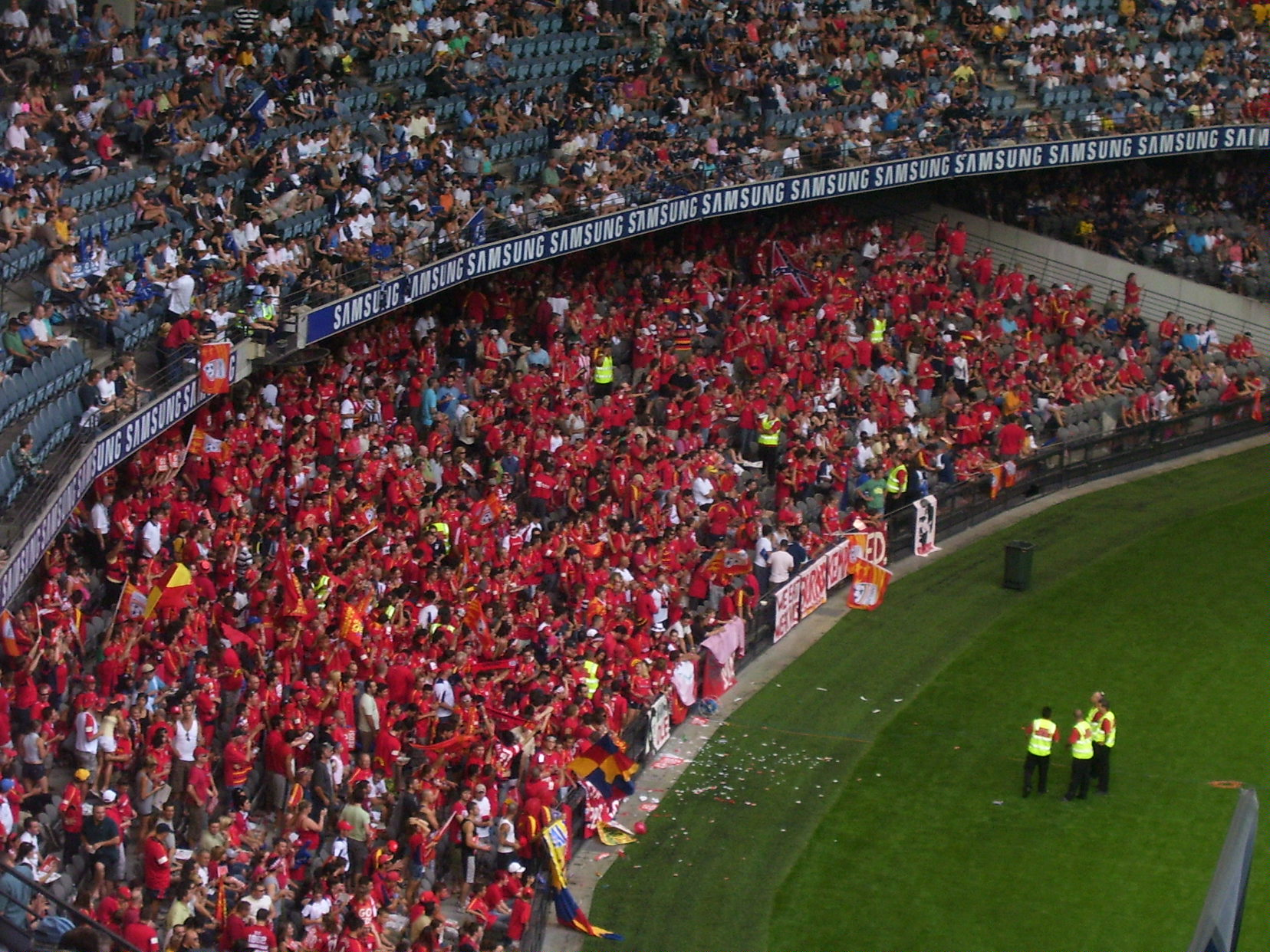
Adelaide United supporters at the 2007 A-League Grand Final

Adelaide United's main active supporters' group is called the Red Army.

=== Average attendance ===
This graph shows the average attendance for home league matches of Adelaide United since their inception. (Note: Average attendance figures:) The figures do not include finals matches.

| 12,648 | 10,948 | 12,165 | 12,697 | 11,713 | 10,765 | 11,552 | 8,829 | 9,592 | 11,225 | 12,637 | 11,287 | 9,565 | 9,830 | 9,013 | 8,183 | 7,383 | 6,501 | 10,359 | 10,035 | 10,575 | 11,073 |
| 03–04 | 05–06 | 06–07 | 07–08 | 08–09 | 09–10 | 10–11 | 11–12 | 12–13 | 13–14 | 14–15 | 15–16 | 16–17 | 17–18 | 18–19 | 19–20 | 20–21 | 21–22 | 22–23 | 23–24 | 24–25 | 25–26 |

== Rivalries ==
=== Melbourne Victory FC ===
Adelaide United's main rivals are Melbourne Victory. Adelaide was again one of two of the leading teams in the 2006–07 season this time against Melbourne that saw an altercation between John Kosmina, the Adelaide United manager, and Kevin Muscat after the Victory captain knocked Kosmina over after entering the technical area to retrieve a ball. Kosmina then jumped up and grabbed Muscat around the throat for a few seconds. Season events culminated in the year's grand final that saw Adelaide captain, Ross Aloisi, sent off and Melbourne winning 6–0. The rivalry went beyond extreme after Melbourne defeated Adelaide United 1–0 in the 2008–09 grand final with United imported striker, Cristiano, given a controversial straight red card. The rivalry then went even further when Adelaide United defeated Melbourne 4–1 at AAMI Park after United had been suffering a record-breaking 10-game losing streak against the Victory.

== Affiliated clubs ==
- (China) Qingdao Red Lions (2018–present)

Qingdao Red Lions are owned by former chairman Piet van der Pol, with the partnership being forged following his acquisition of Adelaide United in 2018. Then Director of Football Bruce Djite said, "The idea is to develop Chinese players to create stronger links between us and Qingdao Red Lions." Chen Yongbin was the first player to sign from Qingdao to Adelaide on a one-year deal. He did not make an appearance for the senior side but made appearances in the youth league, and he departed following the end to his contract.

- (Netherlands) PSV Eindhoven (2024–present)

A strategic partnership between Adelaide United and PSV Eindhoven was announced on 18 April 2024.

- (Netherlands) Heracles Almelo (2025–present)

A second strategic partnership with an Eredivisie team was established late in 2025. The primary intention of the partnership with Heracles is to provide a European pathway as an extension of Adelaide United's strong development programs. The deal was secured following Ernest Faber making the move as the technical director of the Reds to a similar role at Heracles.

== Statistics and records ==
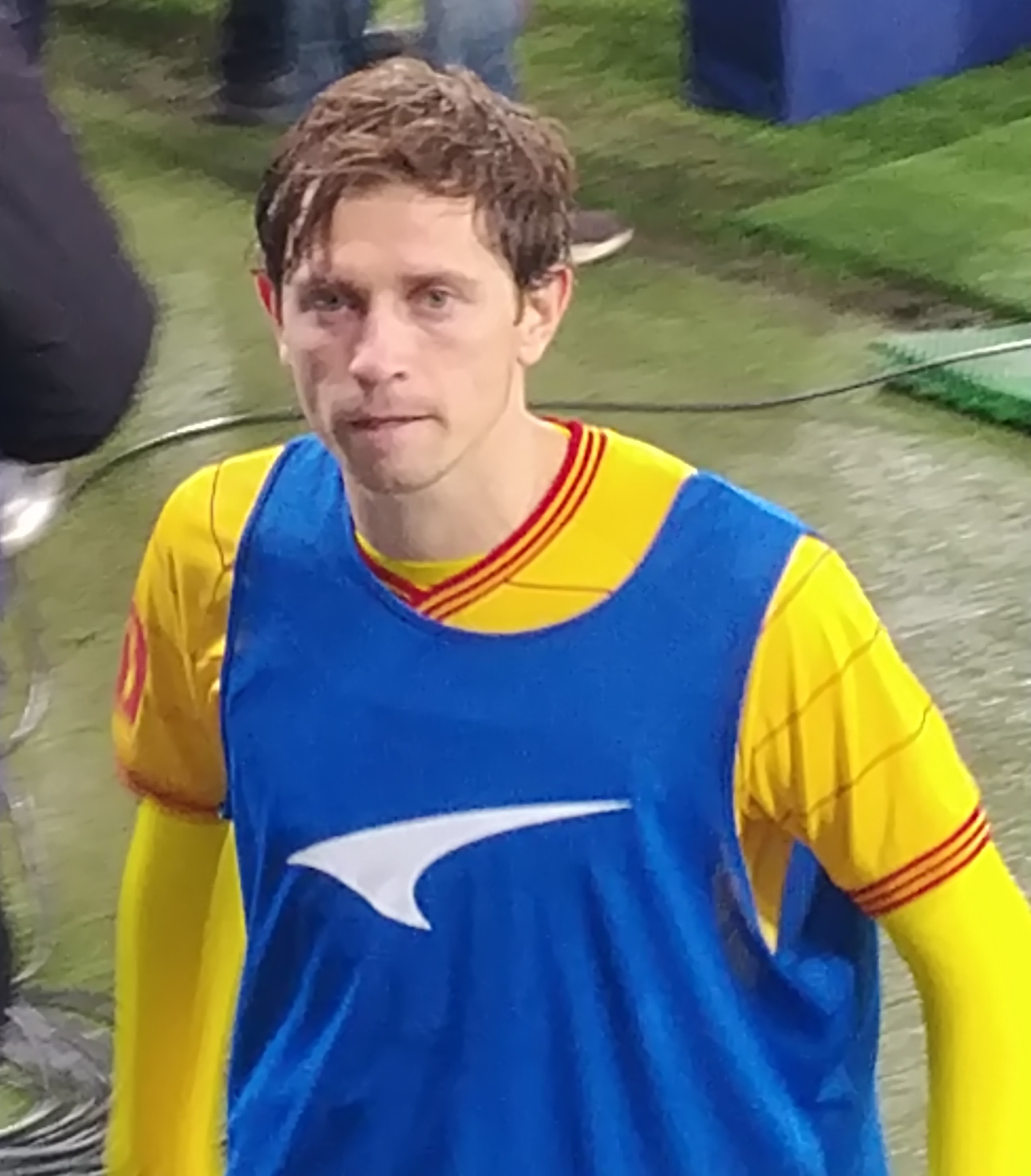
Craig Goodwin is Adelaide United's highest goalscorer, with 60 goals in all competitions.

Adelaide United have won one Championship in the A-League Men. They hold the highest number of FFA Cup trophies, with 3. The club is the only team to have won the FFA Cup twice in succession, in 2018 and 2019.

Adelaide United was the first A-League club to appear in the AFC Champions League Final, which they did in 2008. Western Sydney Wanderers are the only team since to achieve the milestone. The Final result had Adelaide losing in a 5–0 loss with both legs having them defeated by Gamba Osaka 3–0 and 2–0.

Isaías holds the record for most Adelaide United appearances, having played 286 first-team matches since 2013. Craig Goodwin is the club's top goalscorer with 48 goals in all competitions from three spells from 2014 to 2016, 2018 to 2019 and 2021 to 2023.

Adelaide United's record home attendance is 50,119 at the A-League Grand Final match against the Western Sydney Wanderers on 1 May 2016 at Adelaide Oval. The record attendance for a home and away A-League Season game is 25,039 for a 1–3 loss against Sydney FC on 28 December 2007, also at Adelaide Oval. Adelaide United's record home attendance of all competitions at Hindmarsh Stadium was 17,000 against Gamba Osaka in the AFC Champions League Final in 2008.

== Players ==
=== First team squad ===
As of 3 September 2026

Note: Flags indicate national team as defined under FIFA eligibility rules; some limited exceptions apply. Players may hold more than one non-FIFA nationality.

| No. | Pos. | Nation | Player |
|---|---|---|---|
| 3 | DF | NED | Bart Vriends (vice-captain) |
| 4 | DF | AUS | Panagiotis Kikianis |
| 7 | DF | AUS | Ryan Kitto |
| 10 | MF | ESP | Juan Muñiz |
| 11 | FW | AUS | Craig Goodwin (captain) |
| 12 | MF | AUS | Jonny Yull |
| 13 | GK | AUS | Max Vartuli |
| 14 | MF | AUS | Jay Barnett |
| 15 | DF | AUS | Israel Monga (scholarship) |
| 17 | FW | AUS | Ben Folami |
| 18 | FW | AUS | Jake Najdovski |
| 19 | FW | AUS | Amlani Tatu (scholarship) |
| 20 | DF | AUS | Dylan Pierias |
| 21 | FW | AUS | Jacob Brazete |
| 22 | GK | NED | Joshua Smits |

| No. | Pos. | Nation | Player |
|---|---|---|---|
| 23 | MF | AUS | Luke Duzel |
| 27 | FW | AUS | Mitchell Smith (scholarship) |
| 35 | FW | AUS | Brody Burkitt |
| 40 | GK | AUS | Ethan Cox |
| 44 | MF | AUS | Ryan White |
| 52 | DF | AUS | Sotiri Phillis (scholarship) |
| 55 | MF | AUS | Ethan Alagich |
| 58 | FW | AUS | Harry Crawford |
| 62 | MF | AUS | Fabian Talladira (scholarship) |
| 65 | MF | AUS | Joey Garuccio (scholarship) |
| 71 | DF | AUS | Vinko Stanisic (scholarship) |
| 79 | DF | AUS | Feyzo Kasumović (scholarship) |
| 87 | MF | BRA | Anselmo |
| 88 | DF | AUS | Denver Minster (scholarship) |
| 99 | FW | SSD | Ajak Riak |

=== Out on loan ===
Note: Flags indicate national team as defined under FIFA eligibility rules; some limited exceptions apply. Players may hold more than one non-FIFA nationality.

| No. | Pos. | Nation | Player |
|---|---|---|---|
| 78 | DF | AUS | Malual Nichola (on loan at Adelaide City until 31 December 2026) |

== Coaching staff ==
| Position | Name |
|---|---|
| Football business manager | (Netherlands) Mitch van Gellekom |
| Head coach | (Brazil) Airton Andrioli |
| Assistant coaches | (Spain) Isaías; (Australia) Adrian Stenta; (Australia) Paul Vanis |
| Goalkeeping coach | (Australia) Eugene Galekovic |
| Transition and individual coach | (Spain) Javi López |
| Strength and conditioning coach | (Australia) Sean Baker |
| Performance coach | (Australia) Blake Ashby |
| Head physiotherapist | (Australia) Marco Mittiga |
| Physiotherapist | (Australia) Steven Chapman |
| Doctor | (Australia) James Ilic |
| Video analyst | (Australia) Daniel Quinn |
| Team operations officer | (Australia) Phil Welsh |

=== Managerial history ===
| Years | Name | Honours | Notes |
|---|---|---|---|
| 2003–2007 | (Australia) John Kosmina | A-League premiers: 2005–06; Pre-season Cup winners: 2006 | |
| 2007–2010 | (Australia) Aurelio Vidmar | Pre-season Cup winners: 2007 | |
| 2010–2011 | (Netherlands) Rini Coolen | | First international manager |
| 2011–2013 | (Australia) John Kosmina | | |
| 2013 | (Australia) Michael Valkanis | | Interim head coach |
| 2013–2015 | (Spain) Josep Gombau | FFA Cup winners: 2014 | |
| 2015–2017 | (Spain) Guillermo Amor | A-League premiers: 2015–16; A-League champions: 2016 | |
| 2017–2019 | (Germany) Marco Kurz | FFA Cup winners: 2018 | |
| 2019–2020 | (Netherlands) Gertjan Verbeek | FFA Cup winners: 2019 | |
| 2020–2025 | (Australia) Carl Veart | | Longest serving manager |
| 2025– | (Brazil) Airton Andrioli | | |

== Management ==
| Department | Position | Name |
|---|---|---|
| Executive | Chief executive officer | Nathan Kosmina |
| Finance | Chief finance officer | Chris Krotiris |
| Finance | Finance managers | Anthony Nguyen; Natalie Van der Vlies |
| Commercial | Head of commercial | |
| Commercial | Commercial manager | |
| Commercial | Commercial operations coordinator | Angelina Pennino |
| Commercial | Global engagement executive | Huaqing Chen |
| Marketing | Consumer business manager | Tori Dodd |
| Marketing | Consumer business coordinator | Paige Shepherd |
| Marketing | Retail and merchandise coordinator | William Mockridge |
| Marketing | Data analyst | Tomas Greco |
| Marketing | Reception and administration officer | Nikkita Trajkovic |
| Communications | Media and communications manager | Matt Mays |
| Communications | Media officer | Hayley Routley |
| Communications | Graphic designer | Leo Altus |
| Events | Events manager | Christina Gramazio |
| Community | Head of junior development | Marcelo Carrusca |
| Community | Community programs manager | Ruben Garicia Byrne |
| Community | Community officer | Dimi Kourlis |

== Club captains ==
| Dates | Name | Notes | Honours (as captain) |
|---|---|---|---|
| 2005–2007 | (Australia) Ross Aloisi | Inaugural club captain | 2005–06 A-League Premiership |
| 2007–2008 | (Australia) Michael Valkanis | | |
| 2008–2011 | (Australia) Travis Dodd | | |
| 2011–2012 | (Australia) Jonathan McKain | | |
| 2012–2017 | (Australia) Eugene Galekovic | Longest serving captain | 2014 FFA Cup; 2015–16 A-League Premiership; 2015–16 A-League Championship |
| 2017–2019 | (Spain) Isaías Sánchez | First foreign captain | 2018 FFA Cup |
| 2019–2020 | (Denmark) Michael Jakobsen | | 2019 FFA Cup |
| 2020–2022 | (Australia) Stefan Mauk | | |
| 2022–2023 | (Australia) Craig Goodwin | | |
| 2023–2025 | (Australia) Ryan Kitto | | |
| 2025– | (Australia) Craig Goodwin | First player to be appointed captain twice | |

== Honours ==
Chart of yearly table positions for Adelaide United in NSL & A-League Men

=== Domestic ===
- A-League Men Championship
  - Winners (1): 2016
  - Runners-up (2): 2007, 2009
- A-League Men Premiership
  - Winners (2): 2005–06, 2015–16
  - Runners-up (3): 2006–07, 2008–09, 2025–26
- Australia Cup
  - Winners (3): 2014, 2018, 2019
  - Runners-up (1): 2017
- A-League Pre-Season Challenge Cup
  - Winners (2): 2006, 2007

=== Continental ===
- AFC Champions League Elite
  - Runners-up (1): 2008

=== Worldwide ===
- FIFA Club World Cup
  - Fifth–place (1): 2008

=== The Aurelio Vidmar Club Champion (Player of the Year) ===
| Season | Winner |
|---|---|
| 2003–04 | (Australia) Richie Alagich |
| 2005–06 | (Australia) Carl Veart |
| 2006–07 | (Australia) Jason Spagnuolo |
| 2007–08 | (Brazil) Cássio |
| 2008–09 | (Australia) Eugene Galekovic |
| 2009–10 | (Australia) Eugene Galekovic |

| Season | Winner |
|---|---|
| 2010–11 | (Brazil) Cássio |
| 2011–12 | (Australia) Zenon Caravella |
| 2012–13 | (Australia) Dario Vidošić |
| 2013–14 | (Spain) Isaías |
| 2014–15 | (Spain) Sergio Cirio |
| 2015–16 | (Australia) Craig Goodwin |

| Season | Winner |
|---|---|
| 2016–17 | (Spain) Isaías |
| 2017–18 | (Spain) Isaías |
| 2018–19 | (Spain) Isaías |
| 2019–20 | (Australia) Riley McGree |
| 2020–21 | (Australia) Ben Halloran |
| 2021–22 | (Australia) Craig Goodwin |

| Season | Winner |
|---|---|
| 2022–23 | (Australia) Craig Goodwin |
| 2023–24 | (England) Zach Clough |
| 2024–25 | (Australia) Ethan Alagich |
| 2025–26 | (Australia) Ryan White |

== Notable players ==
The following is a list of Adelaide United FC players who have achieved at least two of the following criteria:

- Departed the club with a transfer fee
- Featured in the squad of sixteen of an A-League or FFA Cup grand final victory
- Had international caps for their respective country whilst playing for the club
- International notoriety signing
- Made over five appearances in an A-League premiership-winning season
- Made over fifty appearances across all competitions
- Was a product of the youth academy
- Winner of the A-League grand final man of the match medal, the Johnny Warren Medal
- Winner of the best & fairest, the 'Aurelio Vidmar Club Champion'

Australia

- (Australia) Aaron Goulding
- (Australia) Alexandar Popovic
- (Australia) Al Hassan Toure
- (Australia) Angelo Costanzo
- (Australia) Aurelio Vidmar
- (Australia) Awer Mabil
- (Australia) Ben Halloran
- (Australia) Ben Warland
- (Australia) Bruce Djite
- (Australia) Bruce Kamau
- (Australia) Cameron Watson
- (Australia) Carl Veart
- (Australia) Craig Goodwin
- (Australia) Daniel Mullen
- (Australia) Dario Vidosic
- (Australia) Dylan McGowan
- (Australia) Ethan Alagich
- (Australia) Eugene Galekovic
- (Australia) Fabian Barbiero
- (Australia) George Mells
- (Australia) Giuseppe Bovalina
- (Australia) Iain Fyfe
- (Australia) Isaac Richards
- (Australia) James Jeggo
- (Australia) Jason Spagnuolo
- (Australia) Joe Gauci
- (Australia) John Hall
- (Australia) Jonny Yull
- (Australia) Jordan Elsey
- (Australia) Joshua Cavallo
- (Australia) Kristian Rees
- (Australia) Lachlan Brook
- (Australia) Louis D'Arrigo
- (Australia) Lucas Pantelis
- (Australia) Luka Jovanovic
- (Australia) Matthew Kemp
- (Australia) Michael Marrone
- (Australia) Michael Valkanis
- (Australia) Mohamed Toure
- (Australia) Musa Toure
- (Australia) Nathan Burns
- (Australia) Nathan Konstandopoulos
- (Australia) Nestory Irankunda
- (Australia) Nigel Boogaard
- (Australia) Nikola Mileusnic
- (Australia) Osama Malik
- (Australia) Panagiotis Kikianis
- (Australia) Paul Izzo
- (Australia) Paul Reid
- (Australia) Riley McGree
- (Australia) Richie Alagich
- (Australia) Ross Aloisi
- (Australia) Ryan Kitto
- (Australia) Ryan Strain
- (Australia) Ryan White
- (Australia) Stefan Mauk
- (Australia) Steven Hall
- (Australia) Tarek Elrich
- (Australia) Taylor Regan
- (Australia) Travis Dodd

Argentina

- (Argentina) Marcelo Carrusca
- (Argentina) Marcos Flores

Brazil

- (Brazil) Cássio Oliveira

Denmark

- (Denmark) Michael Jakobsen

England

- (England) Zach Clough

Indonesia

- (Indonesia) Sergio van Dijk

Italy

- (Italy) Iacopo La Rocca

Portugal

- (Portugal) Fábio Ferreira

Spain

- (Spain) Isaías Sánchez
- (Spain) Pablo Sánchez
- (Spain) Sergio Cirio
- (Spain) Javi López

== See also ==
- Adelaide United Women – Adelaide United FC (A-League Women)
