= 2023–24 Central Coast Mariners FC season =

Central Coast Mariners
2023–24 season
- Chairman: Richard Peil
- Manager: Mark Jackson
- Stadium: Industree Group Stadium
- A-League Men: 1st
- A-League Men Finals: Champions
- Australia Cup: Round of 32
- AFC Cup: Winners
- Top goalscorer: League: Ángel Torres (13); All: Ángel Torres (15)
- Highest home attendance: 21,379 vs. Melbourne Victory (25 May 2024); 2024 A-League Men Grand Final
- Lowest home attendance: 1,820 vs. Bali United (26 October 2023); AFC Cup
- Average home league attendance: 7,337
- Biggest win: 9–1 vs. Stallion Laguna (H) (4 October 2023); AFC Cup
- Biggest defeat: 0–3 vs. Adelaide United (A) (20 October 2023); A-League Men
| Home colours | Away colours | Third colours |
- All statistics correct as of 26 May 2024.

The 2023–24 season is the 19th in the history of the Central Coast Mariners Football Club. This is the Central Coast Mariners' 19th season in the A-League Men. In addition to the domestic league, Central Coast also participated in the Australia Cup for the ninth time, and made their debut in the AFC Cup.

== Players ==
Note: Flags indicate national team as defined under FIFA eligibility rules; some limited exceptions apply. Players may hold more than one non-FIFA nationality.

| No. | Pos. | Nation | Player |
|---|---|---|---|
| 2 | DF | BRA | Mikael Doka |
| 3 | DF | VAN | Brian Kaltak |
| 4 | MF | AUS | Josh Nisbet |
| 5 | DF | AUS | Noah Smith |
| 6 | MF | AUS | Max Balard |
| 7 | FW | AUS | Christian Theoharous |
| 9 | FW | AUS | Alou Kuol |
| 11 | FW | COL | Ángel Torres |
| 14 | FW | AUS | Dylan Wenzel-Halls |
| 15 | DF | NZL | Storm Roux |
| 16 | MF | AUS | Harry Steele |
| 17 | FW | AUS | Jing Reec (on loan from AGF) |
| 18 | DF | AUS | Jacob Farrell |
| 20 | GK | AUS | Danny Vukovic (captain) |

| No. | Pos. | Nation | Player |
|---|---|---|---|
| 22 | FW | BRA | Ronald Barcellos (on loan from Portimonense) |
| 23 | DF | FIJ | Dan Hall |
| 26 | MF | MAS | Brad Tapp |
| 27 | DF | AUS | Sasha Kuzevski (scholarship) |
| 28 | MF | AUS | Will Wilson |
| 29 | MF | AUS | Maksim Kasalovic (scholarship) |
| 30 | GK | AUS | Jack Warshawsky |
| 33 | DF | AUS | Nathan Paull |
| 37 | FW | AUS | Bailey Brandtman (scholarship) |
| 39 | FW | AUS | Miguel Di Pizio (scholarship) |
| 40 | GK | AUS | Dylan Peraić-Cullen (scholarship) |
| 41 | DF | AUS | Nicholas Duarte (scholarship) |
| 99 | FW | ENG | Ryan Edmondson |

== Transfers ==
=== Transfers in ===
| No. | Position | Player | Transferred from | Type/fee | Contract length | Date | Ref |
|---|---|---|---|---|---|---|---|
| 30 | GK | Jack Warshawsky | Western Sydney Wanderers | Free transfer | 2 years | 25 May 2023 | |
| 33 | DF | Nathan Paull | Sydney FC NPL | Free transfer | 2 year scholarship | 22 June 2023 | |
| 9 | FW | Alou Kuol | (Germany) VfB Stuttgart | Undisclosed | 3 years | 10 July 2023 | |
| 17 | FW | Jing Reec | (Denmark) AGF | Loan | 1 year | 14 July 2023 | |
| 35 | DF | Trent Millard | Brisbane Roar NPL | Free transfer | 2 year scholarship | 28 July 2023 | |
| 5 | DF | Noah Smith | Brisbane Roar | Free transfer | 2 years | 2 August 2023 | |
| 2 | DF | (Brazil) Mikael Doka | Unattached | Free transfer | 2 years | 2 August 2023 | |
| 28 | MF | William Wilson | Melbourne Victory | Free transfer | 2 years | 26 August 2023 | |
| 11 | FW | (Colombia) Ángel Torres | Unattached | Free transfer | 2 years | 30 August 2023 | |
| 22 | FW | (Brazil) Ronald Barcellos | (Portugal) Portimonense | Loan | 5 months | 21 January 2024 | |
| 99 | FW | (England) Ryan Edmondson | (England) Carlisle United | Free transfer | 2.5 years | 26 January 2024 | |

==== From academy squad ====
| N | Pos. | Nat. | Name | Age | Notes |
|---|---|---|---|---|---|
| 40 | GK | (Australia) | Dylan Peraić-Cullen | 17 | scholarship contract |
| 37 | FW | (Australia) | Bailey Brandtman | 18 | 2-year scholarship contract |
| 41 | FW | (Australia) | Nicholas Duarte | 19 | 2-year scholarship contract |
| 26 | MF | (Malaysia) | Brad Tapp | 22 | 2.5-year contract |

=== Transfers out ===
| No. | Position | Player | Transferred to | Type/fee | Date | Ref |
|---|---|---|---|---|---|---|
| 25 | DF | Nectarios Triantis | (England) Sunderland | £300,000 | 8 June 2023 | |
| 33 | DF | Joshua Hong | Western Sydney Wanderers NPL | Free transfer | 14 June 2023 | |
| 24 | GK | Yaren Sözer | Unattached | End of contract | 17 June 2023 | |
| 40 | GK | Anthony Pavlesic | (Germany) Bayern Munich | Undisclosed | 19 June 2023 | |
| 47 | FW | Olayinka Sunmola | (Australia) Mt Druitt Town Rangers | Free transfer | 24 June 2023 | |
| 37 | MF | Lachlan Bayliss | Newcastle Jets | Free transfer | 26 June 2023 | |
| 9 | FW | Jason Cummings | (India) Mohun Bagan | Undisclosed | 28 June 2023 | |
| 7 | FW | Samuel Silvera | (England) Middlesbrough | Undisclosed | 7 July 2023 | |
| 90 | FW | (Ghana) Paul Ayongo | (Luxembourg) Swift Hesperange | Mutual contract termination | 12 July 2023 | |
| 11 | MF | (France) Béni Nkololo | (Saudi Arabia) Al-Orobah | Mutual contract termination | 1 August 2023 | |
| 10 | FW | (Brazil) Moresche | (Iraq) Naft Al-Basra | End of contract | 9 August 2023 | |
| 5 | DF | (New Zealand) James McGarry | (Scotland) Aberdeen | Undisclosed | 11 August 2023 | |
| 35 | DF | Trent Millard | Unattached | Mutual contract termination | 19 December 2023 | |
| 32 | DF | Dean Larson | Unattached | Mutual contract termination | 26 December 2023 | |
| 10 | FW | (Brazil) Marco Túlio | (Japan) Kyoto Sanga | Undisclosed | 7 January 2024 | |
| 22 | DF | Cameron Windust | Unattached | Mutual contract termination | 23 January 2024 | |
| 28 | MF | James Bayliss | (Australia) Marconi Stallions | Free transfer | 6 February 2024 | |

=== Contract extensions ===
| No. | Player | Position | Duration | Date | Notes | Ref. |
|---|---|---|---|---|---|---|
| 7 | Christian Theoharous | Winger | | 30 June 2023 | Extension option triggered | |
| 10 | (Brazil) Marco Túlio | Forward | 2 years | 5 August 2023 | | |
| 33 | Nathan Paull | Central defender | | 25 October 2023 | Scholarship contract upgraded to senior contract | |
| 15 | (New Zealand) Storm Roux | Right-back | 2 years | 16 December 2023 | Contract extended from end of 2023–24 to end of 2025–26 | |
| 7 | Christian Theoharous | Winger | 1 year | 30 December 2023 | Contract extended from end of 2023–24 to end of 2024–25 | |

== Pre-season and friendlies ==
| 23 August 2023 | Central Coast Mariners | 4–2 | Manly United | Gosford |
| | Kuol; Roux; Túlio | Report | | Stadium: Industree Group Stadium; Attendance: 0 (behind closed doors) |

| 28 August 2023 | Central Coast Mariners | v | Newcastle Jets |
| | | Source |

| 15 September 2023 | Central Coast Mariners | 2–2 | Macarthur FC |
| | | Report |

== Competitions ==
=== Overall record ===
| Competition | First match | Last match | Starting round | Final position | Record | | | | | | | |
| Competition | First match | Last match | Starting round | Final position | Pld | W | D | L | GF | GA | GD | Win % |
|---|---|---|---|---|---|---|---|---|---|---|---|---|
| A-League Men | 20 October 2023 | 29 April 2024 | Matchday 1 | Winners | 27 | 17 | 4 | 6 | 49 | 27 | +22 | 62.96 |
| A-League Men Finals | 10 May 2024 | 25 May 2024 | Semi-finals | Winners | 3 | 2 | 1 | 0 | 5 | 2 | +3 | 66.67 |
| Australia Cup | 13 August 2023 | | Round of 32 | Round of 32 | 1 | 0 | 1 | 0 | 3 | 3 | +0 | 0.00 |
| AFC Cup | 20 September 2023 | 5 May 2024 | Group stage | Winners | 13 | 9 | 3 | 1 | 37 | 10 | +27 | 69.23 |
| Total | | | | | 44 | 28 | 9 | 7 | 94 | 42 | +52 | 63.64 |

Last updated: 26 May 2024
Source: Soccerway

=== A-League Men ===
==== League table ====
| Pos | Team | Pld | W | D | L | GF | GA | GD | Pts | Qualification |
|---|---|---|---|---|---|---|---|---|---|---|
| 1 | Central Coast Mariners (C) | 27 | 17 | 4 | 6 | 49 | 27 | +22 | 55 | Qualification for AFC Champions League Elite and Finals series |
| 2 | Wellington Phoenix (Note: Wellington Phoenix cannot qualify for Asian Football Confederation competitions as they are based in New Zealand, which is part of the Oceania Football Confederation.) | 27 | 15 | 8 | 4 | 42 | 26 | +16 | 53 | Qualification for Finals series (Note: The top two teams enter the finals series at the semi-finals, while the teams ranked third to sixth enter the finals series at the elimination-finals.) |
| 3 | Melbourne Victory | 27 | 10 | 12 | 5 | 43 | 33 | +10 | 42 | Qualification for Finals series |
| 4 | Sydney FC | 27 | 12 | 5 | 10 | 52 | 41 | +11 | 41 | Qualification for AFC Champions League Two and Finals series (Note: Qualified for AFC Champions League Two as the 2023 Australia Cup winners.) |
| 5 | Macarthur FC | 27 | 11 | 8 | 8 | 45 | 48 | −3 | 41 | Qualification for Finals series |

Source: A-Leagues
Rules for classification: 1) points; 2) wins; 3) goal difference; 4) goals scored; 5) head-to-head results; 5a) head-to-head points; 5b) head-to-head goal difference; 6) Fair Play points; 7) away goal difference; 8) away goals per match; 9) home goal difference; 10) home goals per match; 11) toss of a coin in an event of a tie of two clubs.
(C) Champions

==== Results summary ====
Home figures include Central Coast Mariners' 1–1 draw on neutral ground against Melbourne Victory on 13 January 2024.

| Overall | | | | | | | | Home | | | | | | Away | | | | | |
| Pld | W | D | L | GF | GA | GD | Pts | W | D | L | GF | GA | GD | W | D | L | GF | GA | GD |
|---|---|---|---|---|---|---|---|---|---|---|---|---|---|---|---|---|---|---|---|
| 27 | 17 | 4 | 6 | 49 | 27 | +22 | 55 | 9 | 2 | 3 | 28 | 16 | +12 | 8 | 2 | 3 | 21 | 11 | +10 |

Last updated: 1 May 2024.
Source: Ultimate A-League

==== Results by round ====
| Round | 1 | 2 | 3 | 4 | 5 | 6 | 7 | 8 | 9 | 10 | 11 | 27 | 13 | 14 | 15 | 12 | 16 | 17 | 18 | 19 | 20 | 22 | 21 | 23 | 24 | 25 | 26 |
|---|---|---|---|---|---|---|---|---|---|---|---|---|---|---|---|---|---|---|---|---|---|---|---|---|---|---|---|
| Ground | A | H | A | H | H | H | H | A | A | H | A | N | H | H | A | A | H | H | A | A | A | A | H | H | A | H | A |
| Result | L | L | L | L | W | D | W | D | W | W | W | D | W | W | W | D | L | W | W | W | W | L | W | W | W | W | W |
| Position | 12 | 10 | 11 | 12 | 11 | 11 | 9 | 9 | 8 | 6 | 5 | 4 | 4 | 3 | 2 | 3 | 2 | 2 | 2 | 2 | 1 | 2 | 2 | 1 | 1 | 2 | 1 |
| Points | 0 | 0 | 0 | 0 | 3 | 4 | 7 | 8 | 11 | 14 | 17 | 18 | 21 | 24 | 27 | 28 | 28 | 31 | 34 | 37 | 40 | 40 | 43 | 46 | 49 | 52 | 55 |

Updated to match(es) played on 1 May 2024. Source: Ultimate A-League
A = Away; H = Home; N = Neutral; W = Win; D = Draw; L = Loss

==== Matches ====
Win Draw Loss Fixtures

| 20 October 2023 1 | Adelaide United | 3–0 | Central Coast Mariners | Adelaide |
| 19:15 ACDT | Halloran 38'; Clough 64' (pen.); Ansell 80' | Report | | Stadium: Coopers Stadium; Attendance: 9,557; Referee: Alex King |

| 29 October 2023 2 | Central Coast Mariners | 1–2 | Macarthur FC | Gosford |
| 15:00 AEDT | Kaltak 90+1' | Report | Germain 57'; Baccus 84' | Stadium: Industree Group Stadium; Attendance: 6,553; Referee: Adam Kersey |

| 4 November 2023 3 | Perth Glory | 2–0 | Central Coast Mariners | Perth |
| 18:45 AWST | Colakovski 52'; Taggart 90+3' | Report | | Stadium: HBF Park; Attendance: 6,798; Referee: Shaun Evans |

| 12 November 2023 4 | Central Coast Mariners | 1–2 | Brisbane Roar | Gosford |
| 17:00 AEDT | Kuol 31' | Report | Berenguer 19'; Waddingham 41' | Stadium: Industree Group Stadium; Attendance: 7,077; Referee: Jonathan Barreiro |

| 25 November 2023 5 | Central Coast Mariners | 3–1 | Newcastle Jets | Gosford |
| 17:30 AEDT | Roux 45+2'; Wilson 57'; Reec 90+3' | Report | Goodwin 76' | Stadium: Industree Group Stadium; Attendance: 5,143; Referee: Jack Morgan |
Note: Match originally set to be played away at McDonald Jones Stadium, but changed to home at Industree Group Stadium, due to turf renovations.

| 3 December 2023 6 | Central Coast Mariners | 2–2 | Melbourne Victory | Gosford |
| 15:00 AEDT | Kuol 16'; Torres 73' (pen.) | Report | Fornaroli 46'; Velupillay 52' | Stadium: Industree Group Stadium; Attendance: 5,193; Referee: Alex King |

| 8 December 2023 7 | Central Coast Mariners | 4–0 | Western United | Gosford |
| 19:45 AEDT | Hall 11'; Kaltak 24'; Túlio 44'; Kuol 82' | Report | | Stadium: Industree Group Stadium; Attendance: 4,173; Referee: Adam Kersey |

| 17 December 2023 8 | Melbourne City | 3–3 | Central Coast Mariners | Melbourne |
| 17:00 AEDT | Jakoliš 2'; Arslan 67'; Lopane 90+2' | Report | Torres 49', 60', 82' | Stadium: AAMI Park; Attendance: 5,906; Referee: Daniel Elder |

| 21 December 2023 9 | Brisbane Roar | 0–3 | Central Coast Mariners | Brisbane |
| 19:00 AEST | | Report | Túlio 27'; Torres 56', 90+7' | Stadium: Suncorp Stadium; Attendance: 6,855; Referee: Shaun Evans |
Note: Match originally scheduled for 18:45 AEST, but delayed due to thunderstorms. It was rescheduled for 19:00 AEST.

| 31 December 2023 10 | Central Coast Mariners | 4–2 | Perth Glory | Gosford |
| 19:00 AEDT | Farrell 28'; Kuol 39'; Túlio 45+4' (pen.), 90+1' (pen.) | Report | Taggart 18'; Colakovski 52' | Stadium: Industree Group Stadium; Attendance: 15,073; Referee: Jack Morgan |

| 6 January 2024 11 | Western Sydney Wanderers | 0–1 | Central Coast Mariners | Sydney |
| 17:30 AEDT | | Report | Túlio 25' | Stadium: CommBank Stadium; Attendance: 11,982; Referee: Alex King |

| 13 January 2024 27 | Central Coast Mariners | 1–1 | Melbourne Victory | Sydney |
| 17:15 AEDT | Reec 89' | Report | Arzani 33' (pen.) | Stadium: Allianz Stadium; Attendance: 8,147; Referee: Ben Abraham |

| 21 January 2024 13 | Central Coast Mariners | 2–1 | Melbourne City | Gosford |
| 18:00 AEDT | Theoharous 50'; Torres 88' | Report | Ugarkovic 79' | Stadium: Industree Group Stadium; Attendance: 7,096; Referee: Adam Kersey |

| 27 January 2024 14 | Central Coast Mariners | 2–0 | Brisbane Roar | Gosford |
| 19:45 AEDT | Di Pizio 38'; Torres 90' | Report | | Stadium: Industree Group Stadium; Attendance: 6,080; Referee: Tim Danaskos |

| 3 February 2024 15 | Adelaide United | 0–4 | Central Coast Mariners | Adelaide |
| 19:15 ACDT | | Report | Theoharous 31'; Torres 43', 45+2'; Reec 90' (pen.) | Stadium: Coopers Stadium; Attendance: 11,538; Referee: Daniel Elder |

| 6 February 2024 12 | Wellington Phoenix | 0–0 | Central Coast Mariners | Wellington |
| 16:00 NZDT | | Report | | Stadium: Sky Stadium; Attendance: 12,301; Referee: Alex King |

| 10 February 2024 16 | Central Coast Mariners | 1–3 | Sydney FC | Gosford |
| 19:45 AEDT | Torres 56' | Report | Grant 4'; Caceres 8'; Hall 20' (o.g.) | Stadium: Industree Group Stadium; Attendance: 11,379; Referee: Jonathan Barreiro |

| 18 February 2024 17 | Central Coast Mariners | 1–0 | Western Sydney Wanderers | Gosford |
| 17:00 AEDT | Doka 83' (pen.) | Report | | Stadium: Industree Group Stadium; Attendance: 7,568; Referee: Daniel Elder |

| 25 February 2024 18 | Melbourne Victory | 0–1 | Central Coast Mariners | Melbourne |
| 17:00 AEDT | | Report | Teague 48' (o.g.) | Stadium: AAMI Park; Attendance: 10,203; Referee: Tim Danaskos |

| 2 March 2024 19 | Newcastle Jets | 0–1 | Central Coast Mariners | Newcastle |
| 18:00 AEDT | | Report | Nisbet 75' | Stadium: McDonald Jones Stadium; Attendance: 7,117; Referee: Adam Kersey |
Note: Match originally set to be played home at Industree Group Stadium, but changed to away at McDonald Jones Stadium, due to last match against Newcastle Jets resulting in a venue swap.

| 10 March 2024 20 | Macarthur FC | 0–3 | Central Coast Mariners | Sydney |
| 17:00 AEDT | | Report | Nisbet 8'; Barcellos 19'; Edmondson 55' | Stadium: Campbelltown Sports Stadium; Attendance: 4,687; Referee: Daniel Elder |
Note: Originally scheduled for 9 March 2024, was moved due to Central Coast Mariners participating in the 2023–24 AFC Cup.

| 30 March 2024 22 | Sydney FC | 2–0 | Central Coast Mariners | Sydney |
| 19:45 | Caceres 74'; King 77' | Report | | Stadium: Allianz Stadium; Attendance: 12,768; Referee: Shaun Evans |

| 2 April 2024 21 | Central Coast Mariners | 2–1 | Melbourne City | Gosford |
| 19:00 AEDT | Torres 54' (pen.); Balard 90+3' | Report | Arslan 50' | Stadium: Industree Group Stadium; Attendance: 3,266; Referee: Jonathon Barreiro |
Note: Originally scheduled for 17 March 2024, was moved due to Central Coast Mariners participating in the 2023–24 AFC Cup.

| 6 April 2024 23 | Central Coast Mariners | 2–1 | Wellington Phoenix | Gosford |
| 17:30 AEDT | Torres 61'; Doka 90+1' | Report | Old 78' | Stadium: Industree Group Stadium; Attendance: 9,438; Referee: Alex King |

| 13 April 2024 24 | Western United | 0–2 | Central Coast Mariners | Melbourne |
| 15:30 AEST | | Report | Balard 51'; Theoharous 80' | Stadium: Ironbark Fields; Attendance: 3,043; Referee: Jonathon Barreiro |

| 27 April 2024 26 | Newcastle Jets | 1–3 | Central Coast Mariners | Newcastle |
| 17:15 AEST | Stamatelopoulos 47' | Report | Kuol 21'; Steele 82'; Edmondson 87' | Stadium: McDonald Jones Stadium; Attendance: 9,416; Referee: Daniel Elder |

| 1 May 2024 25 | Central Coast Mariners | 2–0 | Adelaide United | Gosford |
| 19:00 AEST | Farrell 36'; Balard 76' | Report | | Stadium: Industree Group Stadium; Attendance: 6,214; Referee: Alex King |
Note: The match was postponed due to Central Coast Mariners' return flight from their AFC Cup match against Abdysha-Ata Kant on 17 April 2024 being delayed due to severe weather in the area.

==== Finals series ====
| 10 May 2024 Semi final | Sydney FC | 1–2 | Central Coast Mariners | Sydney |
| 19:45 AEST | King 25' | Report | Nisbet 45+3'; Doka 56' (pen.) | Stadium: Allianz Stadium; Attendance: 13,813; Referee: Ben Abraham |

| 18 May 2024 Semi final | Central Coast Mariners | 0–0 (2–1 agg.) | Sydney FC | Gosford |
| 19:45 AEST | | Report | | Stadium: Industree Group Stadium; Attendance: 20,059; Referee: Alireza Faghani |

| 25 May 2024 Grand Final | Central Coast Mariners | 3–1 (a.e.t.) | Melbourne Victory | Gosford |
| 19:45 AEST | Edmondson 90+1', 120+1'; Di Pizio 97' | Source | Geria 50' | Stadium: Industree Group Stadium; Attendance: 21,379; Referee: Alex King |

=== Australia Cup ===
Win Draw Loss

| 13 August 2023 Round of 32 | Sydney FC | 3–3 (a.e.t.) (10–9 p) | Central Coast Mariners | Wollongong |
| 15:00 | Mak 42'; Wood 59'; Kucharski 120+3' | Report | Kuol 61'; Túlio 84'; Steele 100' | Stadium: WIN Stadium; Attendance: 2,540; Referee: Alireza Faghani |
| | Penalties |
| | Caceres (penalty scored); Brattan (penalty scored); Kucharski (penalty scored); Girdwood-Reich (penalty scored); Segecic (penalty missed); Glasson (penalty scored); Adamson (penalty scored); King (penalty scored); Gurd (penalty scored); Scarcella (penalty scored); Redmayne (penalty scored) | | (penalty scored) Theoharous; (penalty scored) Wenzel-Halls; (penalty scored) Hammond; (penalty missed) Steele; (penalty scored) Smith; (penalty scored) Nisbet; (penalty scored) Paull; (penalty scored) Hall; (penalty scored) Kaltak; (penalty scored) Farrell; (penalty missed) Warshawsky |

=== AFC Cup ===
==== Group stage ====
The draw for the group stage was held on 24 August 2023.

| Pos | Team | Pld | W | D | L | GF | GA | GD | Pts | Qualification |
|---|---|---|---|---|---|---|---|---|---|---|
| 1 | (Australia) Central Coast Mariners | 6 | 4 | 1 | 1 | 21 | 7 | +14 | 13 | Zonal semi-finals |
| 2 | (Malaysia) Terengganu | 6 | 3 | 3 | 0 | 10 | 6 | +4 | 12 | |
| 3 | (Indonesia) Bali United | 6 | 2 | 1 | 3 | 15 | 15 | 0 | 7 | |
| 4 | (Philippines) Stallion Laguna | 6 | 0 | 1 | 5 | 9 | 27 | −18 | 1 | |

Source: AFC
Rules for classification: Group stage tiebreakers

| 20 September 2023 1 | Terengganu (Malaysia) | 1–0 | (Australia) Central Coast Mariners | Kuala Terengganu, Malaysia |
| 20:00 | Paull 45+1' (o.g.) | Report | | Stadium: Sultan Mizan Zainal Abidin Stadium; Attendance: 5,996; Referee: Al Majarafi Mahmood Salim Said (Oman) |

| 4 October 2023 2 | Central Coast Mariners (Australia) | 9–1 | (Philippines) Stallion Laguna | Gosford |
| 19:00 AEDT | Wenzel-Halls 6', 57'; Túlio 28', 44', 90+2'; Kaltak 63'; Kuol 70'; Torres 75'; Nisbet 85' | Report | Trujillo 31' | Stadium: Central Coast Stadium; Attendance: 4,037; Referee: Gamini Robesh (Sri Lanka) |

| 26 October 2023 3 | Central Coast Mariners (Australia) | 6–3 | (Indonesia) Bali United | Gosford |
| 19:00 AEDT | Farrell 24', 67'; Túlio 34', 37'; Theoharous 50'; Arel 54' (o.g.) | Report | Warshawsky 17' (o.g.); Mbarga 47'; Jefferson 83' | Stadium: Central Coast Stadium; Attendance: 1.820; Referee: Kim Woo-sung (South Korea) |

| 8 November 2023 4 | Bali United (Indonesia) | 1–2 | (Australia) Central Coast Mariners | Gianyar, Indonesia |
| 20:00 | Jefferson 18' | Report | Kuol 13'; Túlio 64' (pen.) | Stadium: Kapten I Wayan Dipta Stadium; Attendance: 2,585; Referee: Nasrullo Kabirov (Tajikistan) |

| 29 November 2023 5 | Central Coast Mariners (Australia) | 1–1 | (Malaysia) Terengganu | Gosford |
| 19:00 AEDT | Di Pizio 87' | Report | Shakir 53' | Stadium: Central Coast Stadium; Attendance: 1,386; Referee: Ammar Ebrahim Hasan Mahfoodh (Bahrain) |

| 13 December 2023 6 | Stallion Laguna (Philippines) | 0–3 | (Australia) Central Coast Mariners | Biñan, Philippines |
| 20:00 | | Report | Túlio 23', 79'; Theoharous 63' | Stadium: Biñan Football Stadium; Referee: Jansen Foo Chuan Hui (Singapore) |

==== Knockout stage ====
| 13 February 2024 Zonal SF | Central Coast Mariners (Australia) | 4–0 | (Cambodia) Phnom Penh Crown | Gosford, Australia |
| 17:00 UTC+11 | Reec 37'; Edmondson 72', 78', 90+4' | Report | | Stadium: Central Coast Stadium; Attendance: 2,014; Referee: Pranjal Banerjee (India) |

| 22 February 2024 Zonal final | Macarthur FC (Australia) | 2–3 (a.e.t.) | (Australia) Central Coast Mariners | Sydney, Australia |
| 19:00 AEDT | Dávila 88'; Rose 92' | Report | Torres 81'; Doka 105+3'; Barcellos 120' | Stadium: Campbelltown Sports Stadium |

| 7 March 2024 Inter-zone semi-finals | Central Coast Mariners (Australia) | 4–0 | (India) Odisha | Gosford, Australia |
| 19:00 AEDT | Doka 36', 77' (pen.); Roux 52'; Barcellos 89' | Report | | Stadium: Central Coast Stadium; Attendance: 2,674; Referee: Qasim Al-Hatmi (Oman) |

| 14 March 2024 Inter-zone semi-finals | Odisha (India) | 0–0 (0–4 agg.) | (Australia) Central Coast Mariners | Bhubaneswar, India |
| 15:00 IST | | Report | | Stadium: Kalinga Stadium |

| 17 April 2024 Inter-zone final | Abdysh-Ata Kant (Kyrgyzstan) | 1–1 | (Australia) Central Coast Mariners | Bishkek, Kyrgyzstan |
| 18:00 KGT | Uzdenov 90+3' | Report | Kaltak 81' | Stadium: Dolen Omurzakov Stadium; Attendance: 10,663; Referee: Gamini Nivon Robesh (Sri Lanka) |

| 24 April 2024 Inter-zone final | Central Coast Mariners (Australia) | 3–0 (4–1 agg.) | (Kyrgyzstan) Abdysh-Ata Kant | Gosford, Australia |
| 19:00 AEST | Di Pizio 77', 90+1'; Doka 86' | Report | | Stadium: Central Coast Stadium; Attendance: 4,723; Referee: Kim Hee-gon (South Korea) |

| 5 May 2024 Final | Al Ahed (Lebanon) | 0–1 | (Australia) Central Coast Mariners | Muscat, Oman |
| 20:00 UTC+4 | | Report | Kuol 84' | Stadium: Sultan Qaboos Sports Complex; Referee: Omar Al-Ali (United Arab Emirates) |

== Statistics ==
=== Appearances and goals ===
Includes all competitions. Players with no appearances not included in the list.

As of 25 May 2024

| No. | Pos. | Nat. | Player | A-League Men | | A-League Men Finals | | Australia Cup | | AFC Cup | | Total | | | | | |
| No. | Pos. | Nat. | Player | Apps | Goals | Apps | Goals | Apps | Goals | Apps | Goals | Apps | Goals | | | | |
|---|---|---|---|---|---|---|---|---|---|---|---|---|---|---|---|---|---|
| No. | Pos. | Nat. | Player | 2 | DF | (Brazil) | Mikael Doka | 15+11 | 2 | 3 | 1 | 1 | 0 | 11+2 | 4 | 43 | 7 |
| 3 | DF | (Vanuatu) | Brian Kaltak | 27 | 2 | 3 | 0 | 0+1 | 0 | 11 | 2 | 42 | 4 | | | | |
| 4 | MF | (Australia) | Josh Nisbet | 27 | 2 | 3 | 1 | 1 | 0 | 13 | 1 | 44 | 4 | | | | |
| 5 | DF | (Australia) | Noah Smith | 2+1 | 0 | 0 | 0 | 0+1 | 0 | 0 | 0 | 4 | 0 | | | | |
| 6 | MF | (Australia) | Max Balard | 26 | 3 | 3 | 0 | 1 | 0 | 12+1 | 0 | 43 | 3 | | | | |
| 7 | FW | (Australia) | Christian Theoharous | 13+10 | 3 | 3 | 0 | 0+1 | 0 | 5+8 | 2 | 40 | 5 | | | | |
| 9 | FW | (Australia) | Alou Kuol | 16+9 | 5 | 3 | 0 | 1 | 1 | 5+4 | 3 | 38 | 9 | | | | |
| 11 | FW | (Colombia) | Ángel Torres | 23 | 13 | 0 | 0 | 0 | 0 | 9+1 | 2 | 33 | 15 | | | | |
| 14 | FW | (Australia) | Dylan Wenzel-Halls | 1+4 | 0 | 0 | 0 | 0+1 | 0 | 2+1 | 2 | 9 | 2 | | | | |
| 15 | DF | (New Zealand) | Storm Roux | 21+2 | 1 | 3 | 0 | 1 | 0 | 8+4 | 1 | 39 | 2 | | | | |
| 16 | MF | (Australia) | Harrison Steele | 3+11 | 1 | 0+2 | 0 | 0+1 | 1 | 2+6 | 0 | 25 | 2 | | | | |
| 17 | FW | (Australia) | Jing Reec | 5+15 | 3 | 0 | 0 | 1 | 0 | 5+4 | 1 | 30 | 4 | | | | |
| 18 | DF | (Australia) | Jacob Farrell | 22 | 2 | 3 | 0 | 1 | 0 | 10 | 2 | 36 | 4 | | | | |
| 20 | GK | (Australia) | Danny Vukovic | 27 | 0 | 3 | 0 | 0 | 0 | 12 | 0 | 42 | 0 | | | | |
| 22 | FW | (Brazil) | Ronald Barcellos | 1+9 | 1 | 0+2 | 0 | 0 | 0 | 2+3 | 2 | 17 | 3 | | | | |
| 23 | DF | (Fiji) | Dan Hall | 23 | 1 | 3 | 0 | 1 | 0 | 11 | 0 | 38 | 1 | | | | |
| 26 | MF | (Malaysia) | Brad Tapp | 11+4 | 0 | 3 | 0 | 0 | 0 | 6+3 | 0 | 27 | 0 | | | | |
| 28 | MF | (Australia) | William Wilson | 4+6 | 1 | 0 | 0 | 0 | 0 | 4+1 | 0 | 15 | 1 | | | | |
| 30 | GK | (Australia) | Jack Warshawsky | 0 | 0 | 0 | 0 | 1 | 0 | 1+1 | 0 | 3 | 0 | | | | |
| 33 | DF | (Australia) | Nathan Paull | 6+6 | 0 | 0 | 0 | 1 | 0 | 5+1 | 0 | 19 | 0 | | | | |
| 37 | FW | (Australia) | Bailey Brandtman | 1+3 | 0 | 0+1 | 0 | 0 | 0 | 0+3 | 0 | 8 | 0 | | | | |
| 39 | MF | (Australia) | Miguel Di Pizio | 6+13 | 1 | 0+2 | 1 | 0 | 0 | 4+6 | 3 | 31 | 5 | | | | |
| 41 | FW | (Australia) | Nicholas Duarte | 0 | 0 | 0 | 0 | 0 | 0 | 0+1 | 0 | 1 | 0 | | | | |
| 99 | FW | (England) | Ryan Edmondson | 7+5 | 2 | 0+3 | 2 | 0 | 0 | 3+4 | 3 | 22 | 7 | | | | |
Player(s) transferred out but featured this season
| 10 | FW | (Brazil) | Marco Túlio | 11 | 5 | 0 | 0 | 1 | 1 | 6 | 8 | 18 | 14 | | | | |
| 34 | FW | (Australia) | Aydan Hammond | 0 | 0 | 0 | 0 | 0+1 | 0 | 0 | 0 | 1 | 0 | | | | |

=== Disciplinary record ===
Includes all competitions. The list is sorted by squad number when total cards are equal. Players with no cards not included in the list.

As of 25 May 2024

| Rank | No. | Pos. | Nat. | Name | A-League Men | | | A-League Men Finals | | | Australia Cup | | | AFC Cup | | | Total | | |
| Rank | No. | Pos. | Nat. | Name | Yellow card | (yellow card) (yellow-red card) | Red card | Yellow card | (yellow card) (yellow-red card) | Red card | Yellow card | (yellow card) (yellow-red card) | Red card | Yellow card | (yellow card) (yellow-red card) | Red card | Yellow card | (yellow card) (yellow-red card) | Red card |
|---|---|---|---|---|---|---|---|---|---|---|---|---|---|---|---|---|---|---|---|
| 1 | 15 | DF | (New Zealand) | Storm Roux | 4 | 0 | 1 | 1 | 0 | 0 | 0 | 0 | 0 | 0 | 0 | 0 | 5 | 0 | 1 |
| 2 | 11 | FW | (Colombia) | Ángel Torres | 3 | 0 | 1 | 0 | 0 | 0 | 0 | 0 | 0 | 1 | 0 | 0 | 4 | 0 | 1 |
| 3 | 22 | FW | (Brazil) | Ronald Barcellos | 1 | 0 | 1 | 0 | 0 | 0 | 0 | 0 | 0 | 1 | 0 | 0 | 2 | 0 | 1 |
| 4 | 16 | MF | (Australia) | Harrison Steele | 0 | 0 | 1 | 0 | 0 | 0 | 0 | 0 | 0 | 0 | 0 | 0 | 0 | 0 | 1 |
| 5 | 18 | DF | (Australia) | Jacob Farrell | 5 | 1 | 0 | 2 | 0 | 0 | 0 | 0 | 0 | 2 | 0 | 0 | 9 | 1 | 0 |
| 6 | 7 | FW | (Australia) | Christian Theoharous | 7 | 0 | 0 | 1 | 0 | 0 | 1 | 0 | 0 | 2 | 0 | 0 | 11 | 0 | 0 |
| 7 | 9 | FW | (Australia) | Alou Kuol | 5 | 0 | 0 | 1 | 0 | 0 | 1 | 0 | 0 | 0 | 0 | 0 | 7 | 0 | 0 |
| 8 | 2 | DF | (Brazil) | Mikael Doka | 4 | 0 | 0 | 1 | 0 | 0 | 0 | 0 | 0 | 1 | 0 | 0 | 6 | 0 | 0 |
| 9 | 23 | DF | (Fiji) | Dan Hall | 4 | 0 | 0 | 0 | 0 | 0 | 1 | 0 | 0 | 0 | 0 | 0 | 5 | 0 | 0 |
| 10 | 3 | DF | (Vanuatu) | Brian Kaltak | 4 | 0 | 0 | 0 | 0 | 0 | 0 | 0 | 0 | 0 | 0 | 0 | 4 | 0 | 0 |
| 10 | 20 | GK | (Australia) | Danny Vukovic | 3 | 0 | 0 | 0 | 0 | 0 | 0 | 0 | 0 | 1 | 0 | 0 | 4 | 0 | 0 |
| 10 | 28 | MF | (Australia) | William Wilson | 2 | 0 | 0 | 0 | 0 | 0 | 0 | 0 | 0 | 2 | 0 | 0 | 4 | 0 | 0 |
| 13 | 6 | MF | (Australia) | Max Balard | 3 | 0 | 0 | 0 | 0 | 0 | 0 | 0 | 0 | 0 | 0 | 0 | 3 | 0 | 0 |
| 13 | 26 | MF | (Malaysia) | Brad Tapp | 1 | 0 | 0 | 0 | 0 | 0 | 0 | 0 | 0 | 2 | 0 | 0 | 3 | 0 | 0 |
| 15 | 4 | MF | (Australia) | Josh Nisbet | 1 | 0 | 0 | 0 | 0 | 0 | 0 | 0 | 0 | 0 | 0 | 0 | 1 | 0 | 0 |
| 15 | 5 | DF | (Australia) | Noah Smith | 1 | 0 | 0 | 0 | 0 | 0 | 0 | 0 | 0 | 0 | 0 | 0 | 1 | 0 | 0 |
| 15 | 33 | DF | (Australia) | Nathan Paull | 0 | 0 | 0 | 0 | 0 | 0 | 0 | 0 | 0 | 1 | 0 | 0 | 1 | 0 | 0 |
| 15 | 99 | FW | (England) | Ryan Edmondson | 0 | 0 | 0 | 0 | 0 | 0 | 0 | 0 | 0 | 1 | 0 | 0 | 1 | 0 | 0 |
Player(s) transferred out but featured this season
| 1 | 10 | FW | (Brazil) | Marco Túlio | 2 | 0 | 0 | 0 | 0 | 0 | 0 | 0 | 0 | 0 | 0 | 0 | 2 | 0 | 0 |
| Total | | | | | 50 | 1 | 4 | 6 | 0 | 0 | 3 | 0 | 0 | 14 | 0 | 0 | 73 | 1 | 4 |

=== Clean sheets ===
Includes all competitions. The list is sorted by squad number when total clean sheets are equal. Numbers in parentheses represent games where both goalkeepers participated and both kept a clean sheet; the number in parentheses is awarded to the goalkeeper who was substituted on, whilst a full clean sheet is awarded to the goalkeeper who was on the field at the start and end of play. Goalkeepers with no clean sheets not included in the list.

As of 25 May 2024

| Rank | No. | Nat. | Goalkeeper | A-League Men | A-League Men Finals | Australia Cup | AFC Cup | Total |
|---|---|---|---|---|---|---|---|---|
| 1 | 20 | (Australia) | Danny Vukovic | 12 | 1 | 0 | 6 | 19 |
| Total | | | | 12 | 1 | 0 | 6 | 19 |

== Kits ==
Supplier: Cikers Australia / Sponsor: Mate / Cup Sponsor: DMC Conveyor Services / AFC Cup Sponsor: AirAsia

| Home | Away | Third | Goalkeeper^{1} | Goalkeeper^{2} | Goalkeeper^{3} |

| Cup Home | Cup Away | Goalkeeper^{Cup} |

== See also ==
- 2023–24 Central Coast Mariners FC (A-League Women) season
- List of Central Coast Mariners FC seasons
