= 2024 AFC Cup final =

- Event: 2023–24 AFC Cup
Al-Ahed	Central Coast Mariners
(Lebanon)	(Australia)
0	1
- Date: 5 May 2024
- Venue: Sultan Qaboos Sports Complex, Muscat, Oman
- Referee: Omar Al-Ali (UAE)
- Attendance: 1,930

The 2024 AFC Cup final was the final match of the 2023–24 AFC Cup, the 19th edition of the AFC Cup, Asia's secondary club football tournament organized by the Asian Football Confederation (AFC), and the final edition under the AFC Cup title, as the competition was revamped under the name AFC Champions League Two starting in 2024–25. The final was contested as a single match between Al-Ahed from Lebanon and Central Coast Mariners from Australia. The match was played at the Sultan Qaboos Sports Complex in Muscat on 5 May 2024.

Central Coast Mariners won the final 1–0 to crown their maiden title and become the first Australian club to win the competition. By also winning the competition, Australia became the first and only nation in the AFC to have had clubs winning both the AFC Champions League and AFC Cup, after Western Sydney Wanderers' win of the 2014 AFC Champions League. It was also the third, and final time, that a club from outside West Asia had won the competition.

== Background ==
This was the first meeting between Central Coast Mariners and Al-Ahed. For Central Coast Mariners, this was their first AFC Cup final appearance in the club's history under the appointment of Mark Jackson. The Mariners were competing to win their first continental trophy and complete a treble with the league premiership and the finals series in hand after the final. At the time, no Australian clubs have secured three trophies in a season or an AFC Cup title. In contrast, this was Al-Ahed's second AFC Cup final appearance, having won 1–0 in 2019 against April 25 at Kuala Lumpur Stadium, the first continental title for the club and Lebanese football. The final was due to be the last edition of the AFC Cup before the reformat to the AFC Champions League Two the next season.

Team	Zone	Previous finals appearances (bold indicates winners)
(Lebanon) Al-Ahed	West Asia Zone (WAFF)	1 (**2019**)
(Australia) Central Coast Mariners	ASEAN Zone (AFF)	None

== Venue ==
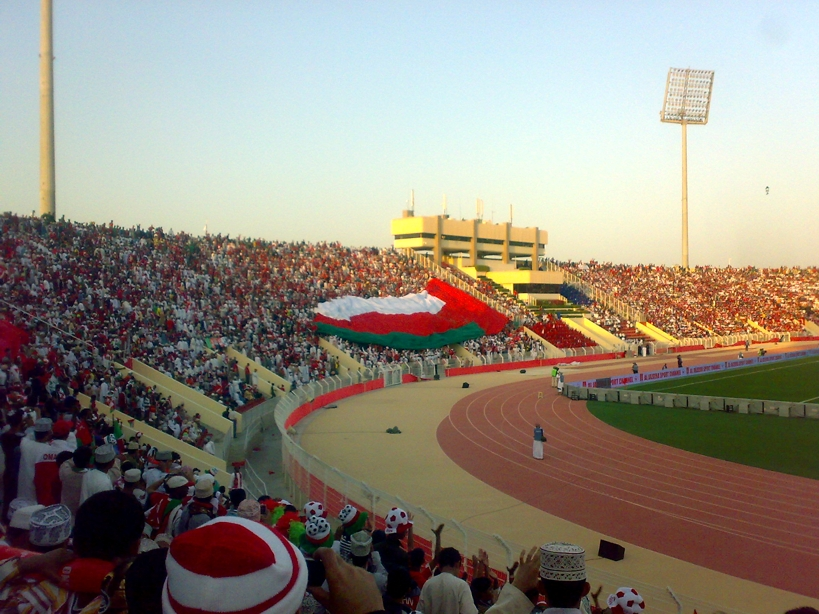
Sultan Qaboos Sports Complex in Muscat, Oman, hosted the match.

The match was originally scheduled to be hosted by Al-Ahed at the Camille Chamoun Sports City Stadium in Beirut, Lebanon. However, due to the ongoing Lebanese liquidity crisis, combined with concerns of the Gaza war, the match was instead played on a neutral ground at the Sultan Qaboos Sports Complex in Muscat, Oman as the home stadium of the Lebanese side.

== Road to the final ==
Note: In all results below, the score of the finalist is given first (H: home; A: away).

(Lebanon) Al-Ahed				Round	(Australia) Central Coast Mariners			
Opponent	Result			Group stage	Opponent	Result		
(Oman) Al-Nahda	2–1 (H)			Matchday 1	(Malaysia) Terengganu	0–1 (A)		
(Syria) Al-Fotuwa	0–1 (A)			Matchday 2	(Philippines) Stallion Laguna	9–1 (H)		
(Palestine) Jabal Al-Mukaber	Cancelled (H)			Matchday 3	(Indonesia) Bali United	6–3 (H)		
(Palestine) Jabal Al-Mukaber	Cancelled (A)			Matchday 4	(Indonesia) Bali United	2–1 (A)		
(Oman) Al-Nahda	1–2 (A)			Matchday 5	(Malaysia) Terengganu	1–1 (H)		
(Syria) Al-Fotuwa	2–1 (H)			Matchday 6	(Philippines) Stallion Laguna	3–0 (A)		
Group A runners-up: Pos / Team / Pld / Pts; 1 / (Oman) Al-Nahda / 4 / 9; 2 / (Lebanon) Al-Ahed / 4 / 6; 3 / (Syria) Al-Fotuwa / 4 / 3; 4 / (Palestine) Jabal Al-Mukaber / 0 / 0; Source: AFC				Final standings	Group G winners: Pos / Team / Pld / Pts; 1 / (Australia) Central Coast Mariners / 6 / 13; 2 / (Malaysia) Terengganu / 6 / 12; 3 / (Indonesia) Bali United / 6 / 7; 4 / (Philippines) Stallion Laguna / 6 / 1; Source: AFC			
Opponent	Agg.	1st leg	2nd leg	Knockout stage	Opponent	Agg.	1st leg	2nd leg
(Iraq) Al-Kahrabaa	1–1 (a.e.t.) (4–2 p)	0–1 (H)	1–0 (A)	Zonal semi-finals	(Cambodia) Phnom Penh Crown	4–0 (H)	—	
(Oman) Al-Nahda	3–2	1–0 (H)	2–2 (A)	Zonal finals	(Australia) Macarthur FC	3–2 (a.e.t.) (A)	—	
—				Inter-zone play-off semi-finals	(India) Odisha	4–0	4–0 (H)	0–0 (A)
—				Inter-zone play-off finals	(Kyrgyzstan) Abdysh-Ata Kant	4–1	1–1 (A)	3–0 (H)

== Format ==
The final was played as a single match, with the host team (winners of the West Asia Zonal final) alternated from the previous season's final.

If the game would be tied after regulation time, the winning team would be decided by extra time and, if necessary, a penalty shoot-out.

== Match ==
=== Details ===
5 May 2024
20:00 UTC+4

Al-Ahed (Lebanon)	0–1	(Australia) Central Coast Mariners
	Report	Kuol 84'

Sultan Qaboos Sports Complex, Muscat (Oman) (Note: Al Ahed played their home matches at a neutral venue due to the ongoing Israeli invasion of Lebanon.)
Attendance: 1,930
Referee: Omar Al-Ali (United Arab Emirates)

Al-Ahed	Central Coast Mariners

GK	95	(Lebanon) Mostafa Matar
RB	6	(Lebanon) Hussein Zein (c)	(yellow card) 75'	(substituted off) 83'
CB	18	(Lebanon) Felix Michel Melki	(yellow card) 90+7'
CB	5	(Lebanon) Khalil Khamis
LB	2	(Syria) Diaa Al-Haq Mohammad
RM	10	(Lebanon) Mohamad Haidar		(substituted off) 60'
CM	22	(Lebanon) Walid Shour	(yellow card) 81'
CM	12	(Lebanon) Hassan Srour
LM	21	(Syria) Mohammad Al Marmour		(substituted off) 88'
CF	99	(Syria) Mohammad Al Hallak
CF	9	(Scotland) Lee Erwin
Substitutes:
GK	1	(Lebanon) Shareef Azaki
GK	13	(Lebanon) Shaker Wehbe
MF	7	(Lebanon) Ali Al Haj		(substituted on) 60'
DF	8	(Lebanon) Hussein Dakik
MF	11	(Lebanon) Karim Darwich		(substituted on) 88'
FW	20	(Lebanon) Karim Fadel
MF	24	(Lebanon) Hassan Farhat
FW	71	(Lebanon) Zein Farran
DF	23	(Lebanon) Ali Hadid
DF	4	(Lebanon) Nour Mansour		(substituted on) 83'
MF	30	(Lebanon) Mahmoud Zbib
MF	91	(Lebanon) Karim Abo Zeid
Manager:
(Syria) Raafat Mohammad

GK	20	(Australia) Danny Vukovic (c)
RB	2	(Brazil) Mikael Doka
CB	23	(Australia) Dan Hall
CB	3	(Vanuatu) Brian Kaltak
LB	18	(Australia) Jacob Farrell
RM	39	(Australia) Miguel Di Pizio	(substituted off) 66'
CM	6	(Australia) Max Balard
CM	26	(Australia) Brad Tapp	(substituted off) 89'
LM	7	(Australia) Christian Theoharous	(substituted off) 46'
CF	99	(England) Ryan Edmondson	(substituted off) 64'
CF	4	(Australia) Josh Nisbet
Substitutes:
GK	30	(Australia) Jack Warshawsky
FW	37	(Australia) Bailey Brandtman
FW	9	(Australia) Alou Kuol	(substituted on) 64'
DF	33	(Australia) Nathan Paull
FW	17	(Australia) Jing Reec
FW	22	(Brazil) Ronald Barcellos	(substituted on) 46'
DF	15	(New Zealand) Storm Roux	(substituted on) 66'
MF	16	(Australia) Harry Steele	(substituted on) 89'
FW	14	(Australia) Dylan Wenzel-Halls
MF	28	(Australia) William Wilson
Manager:
(England) Mark Jackson

Assistant referees:
Mohammed Al-Hammadi (United Arab Emirates)
Jasem Al-Ali (United Arab Emirates)
Fourth official:
Sultan Al-Hammadi (United Arab Emirates)
Reserve assistant referee:
Abdulla Al-Marri (Qatar)
Video assistant referees:
Adel Al-Naqbi (United Arab Emirates)
Yahya Al-Mulla (United Arab Emirates)

=== Statistics ===
Overall
Statistic	Al-Ahed	Central Coast
Goals scored	0	1
Total shots	6	10
Shots on target	2	4
Yellow cards	3	0
Red cards	0	0
