= 2023–24 AFC Cup knockout stage =

The 2023–24 AFC Cup knockout stage was played from 12 February to 5 May 2024. A total of 11 teams competed in the knockout stage to decide the champions of the 2023–24 AFC Cup.

== Qualified teams ==
The following teams advanced from the group stage:

- The winners of the groups and the best runners-up in the West Asia Zone (Groups A–C) and the ASEAN Zone (Groups F–H) advanced to the Zonal semi-finals.
- The winners of each group in the South Asia Zone (Group D), the Central Asia Zone (Group E), and the East Asia Zone (Group I) advanced to the Inter-zone play-off semi-finals.

Key to colours
Teams which entered the Inter-zone play-off semi-finals
Teams which entered the Zonal semi-finals

Zone	Group	Winners	Best runners-up
West Asia Zone	A	(Oman) Al-Nahda	(Lebanon) Al Ahed
West Asia Zone	B	(Iraq) Al-Kahrabaa	—
West Asia Zone	C	(Bahrain) Al-Riffa	—
South Asia Zone	D	(India) Odisha	—
Central Asia Zone	E	(Kyrgyzstan) Abdysh-Ata Kant	—
ASEAN Zone	F	(Australia) Macarthur FC	(Cambodia) Phnom Penh Crown
ASEAN Zone	G	(Australia) Central Coast Mariners	—
ASEAN Zone	H	(Malaysia) Sabah	—
East Asia Zone	I	(Chinese Taipei) Taichung Futuro	—

== Format ==
In the knockout stage, the 11 teams will play a single-elimination tournament. Each tie was played on a home-and-away two-legged basis, except the ASEAN Zone's semi-finals, ASEAN Zone's final and the final which will be played as a single match. Extra time and penalty shoot-out will be used to decide the winners if necessary (note that the away goals rule is abolished). (Regulations Article 11.3).

The draw for the Zonal finals and the Inter-zone play-off semi-finals was held on 28 December 2023, 14:00 MYT (UTC+8), at the AFC House in Kuala Lumpur, Malaysia.

Round	Matchups
Zonal semi-finals	West Asia Zone (Matchups and order of legs determined by identity of best runners-up: first team listed host first leg, second team listed host second leg): If best runners-up from Group A; WSF1: Group C winners vs. Group A winners; WSF2: Group A runners-up vs. Group B winners; If best runners-up from Group B; WSF1: Group A winners vs. Group B winners; WSF2: Group B runners-up vs. Group C winners; If best runners-up from Group C; WSF1: Group B winners vs. Group C winners; WSF2: Group C runners-up vs. Group A winners; ASEAN Zone (Matchups and host determined by identity of best runners-up): If best runners-up from Group F; ASF1: Group F winners vs. Group H winners; ASF2: Group G winners vs. Group F runners-up; If best runners-up from Group G; ASF1: Group G winners vs. Group F winners; ASF2: Group H winners vs. Group G runners-up; If best runners-up from Group H; ASF1: Group H winners vs. Group G winners; ASF2: Group F winners vs. Group H runners-up
Zonal finals	(Order of legs decided by draw) West Asia Zone: WF: Winners of WSF1 vs. Winners of WSF2; ASEAN Zone: AF: Winners of ASF1 vs. Winners of ASF2
Inter-zone play-off semi-finals	(Matchups and order of legs decided by draw, involving winners of Group D, Group E, Group I, and AF): IZSF1; IZSF2
Inter-zone play-off final	(Winners of IZSF1 host first leg, Winners of IZSF2 host second leg): IZF: Winners of IZSF1 vs. Winners of IZSF2
Final	(Winners of West Zone host match, as alternated from previous season's final): Winners of WF vs. Winners of IZF

== Schedule ==
After the draw, the schedule of each round is as follows.

Stage	Round	Leg	West Asia	South Asia	Central Asia	ASEAN	East Asia
Knockout stage	Zonal semi-finals	First leg	12–13 February 2024	Not played	Not played	13 February 2024	Not played
Knockout stage	Zonal semi-finals	Second leg	19–20 February 2024	Not played	Not played	13 February 2024	Not played
Knockout stage	Zonal finals	First leg	16 April 2024	Not played	Not played	22 February 2024	Not played
Knockout stage	Zonal finals	Second leg	23 April 2024	Not played	Not played	22 February 2024	Not played
Knockout stage	Inter-zone play-off semi-finals	First leg	Not played	6–7 March 2024			
Knockout stage	Inter-zone play-off semi-finals	Second leg	Not played	13–14 March 2024			
Knockout stage	Inter-zone play-off final	First leg	Not played	17 April 2024			
Knockout stage	Inter-zone play-off final	Second leg	Not played	24 April 2024			
Knockout stage	Final		5 May 2024				

== Bracket ==
Zonal semi-finals
(Australia) Macarthur FC	3
(Malaysia) Sabah	0
ASEAN Zone
(Australia) Central Coast Mariners	4
(Cambodia) Phnom Penh Crown	0
(Bahrain) Al-Riffa	1	1	2
(Oman) Al-Nahda	1	3	4
West Asia Zone
(Lebanon) Al Ahed (p)	0	1	1 (4)
(Iraq) Al-Kahrabaa	1	0	1 (2)

Zonal finals
(Australia) Macarthur FC	2
(Australia) Central Coast Mariners (a.e.t.)	3
(Oman) Al-Nahda	0	2	2
(Lebanon) Al Ahed	1	2	3

Inter-zone play-off semi-finals
(Australia) Central Coast Mariners	4	0	4
(India) Odisha	0	0	0
(Kyrgyzstan) Abdysh-Ata Kant	5	3	8
(Chinese Taipei) Taichung Futuro	0	1	1

Inter-zone play-off finals
(Australia) Central Coast Mariners	1	3	4
(Kyrgyzstan) Abdysh-Ata Kant	1	0	1

Final
5 May – Muscat
(Australia) Central Coast Mariners	1
(Lebanon) Al Ahed	0

== Zonal semi-finals ==
=== Summary ===
In the Zonal semi-finals, the four qualified teams from the West Asia Zone (Groups A–C) play in two ties, and the four qualified teams from the ASEAN Zone (Groups F–H) play in two ties, with the matchups and order of legs determined by the group stage draw and the identity of the best runners-up.

West Asia Zone
Team 1	Agg.	Team 2	1st leg	2nd leg
Al-Riffa (Bahrain)	2–4	(Oman) Al-Nahda	1–1	1–3 (a.e.t.)
Al Ahed (Lebanon)	1–1 (4–2 p)	(Iraq) Al-Kahrabaa	0–1	1–0 (a.e.t.)

ASEAN Zone
Team 1	Score	Team 2
Macarthur FC (Australia)	3–0	(Malaysia) Sabah
Central Coast Mariners (Australia)	4–0	(Cambodia) Phnom Penh Crown

=== West Asia Zone ===
12 February 2024
19:00 UTC+3

Al-Riffa (Bahrain)	1–1	(Oman) Al-Nahda
Haram 62'	Report	Gui 77'

Khalifa Sports City Stadium, Isa Town
Attendance: 919
Referee: Hassan Akrami (Iran)
19 February 2024
20:00 UTC+4

Al-Nahda (Oman)	3–1 (a.e.t.)	(Bahrain) Al-Riffa
Bwalya 59'; Al-Saadi 94'; Al-Sabhi 107'	Report	Isa 33'

Sultan Qaboos Sports Complex, Muscat
Attendance: 4,324
Referee: Dae-yong Kim (South Korea)

Al-Nahda won 4–2 on aggregate.

13 February 2024
20:00 UTC+4

Al Ahed (Lebanon)	0–1	(Iraq) Al-Kahrabaa
	Report	Midani 20'

Sultan Qaboos Sports Complex, Muscat (Oman) (Note: Al Ahed played their home matches at a neutral venue due to the ongoing Israeli invasion of Lebanon.)
Attendance: 150
Referee: Ahmed Faisal Mohammad Al Ali (Jordan)
20 February 2024
19:00 UTC+3

Al-Kahrabaa (Iraq)	0–1 (a.e.t.)	(Lebanon) Al Ahed
	Report	Erwin 85'
Penalties
Abdulameer (penalty missed); Salim (penalty scored); Khalil (penalty missed); Midani (penalty scored)	2–4	(penalty missed) Darwich; (penalty scored) Haidar; (penalty scored) Zein; (penalty scored) Michel Melki; (penalty scored) Matar

Basra International Stadium, Basra
Attendance: 12,754
Referee: Sadullo Gulmurodi (Tajikistan)

1–1 on aggregate. Al Ahed won on penalties.

=== ASEAN Zone ===
13 February 2024
18:00 UTC+11

Macarthur FC (Australia)	3–0	(Malaysia) Sabah FC
Dávila 40'; Drew 46', 80'	Report

Campbelltown Sports Stadium, Sydney
Attendance: 2,225
Referee: Nasrullo Kabirov (Tajikistan)
13 February 2024
20:00 UTC+11

Central Coast Mariners (Australia)	4–0	(Cambodia) Phnom Penh Crown
Reec 37'; Edmondson 72', 78', 90+4'	Report

Central Coast Stadium, Gosford
Attendance: 2,014
Referee: Pranjal Banerjee (India)

== Zonal finals ==
=== Summary ===
Draw for the Zonal finals was held on 28 December. In the Zonal finals, the two winners of West Asia Zonal semi-finals play each other, with the order of legs decided by draw. The two winners of ASEAN Zonal semi-finals play each other, with the host decided by draw. The winners of the West Asia Zonal final advances to the final, while the winners of the ASEAN Zonal final advance to the Inter-zone play-off semi-finals.

West Asia Zone
Team 1	Agg.	Team 2	1st leg	2nd leg
Al Ahed (Lebanon)	3–2	(Oman) Al-Nahda	1–0	2–2

ASEAN Zone
Team 1	Score	Team 2
Macarthur FC (Australia)	2–3 (a.e.t.)	(Australia) Central Coast Mariners

=== West Asia Zone ===
16 April 2024
19:00 UTC+3

Al Ahed (Lebanon)	1–0	(Oman) Al-Nahda
Al-Hallak 46'	Report

Karbala International Stadium, Karbala (Iraq) (Note: Al Ahed played their home matche at a neutral venue (Iraq) due to the ongoing Israeli invasion of Lebanon.)
Attendance: 7,632
Referee: Faisal Al Balawi (Saudi Arabia)
23 April 2024
20:00 UTC+4

Al-Nahda (Oman)	2–2	(Lebanon) Al Ahed
Al-Malki 53'; Bwalya 89'	Report	Erwin 82', 87'

Sultan Qaboos Sports Complex, Muscat
Attendance: 3,420
Referee: Jumpei Iida (Japan)

Al Ahed won 3–2 on aggregate.

=== ASEAN Zone ===
22 February 2024
19:00 UTC+11

Macarthur FC (Australia)	2–3 (a.e.t.)	(Australia) Central Coast Mariners
Dávila 88'; Rose 92'	Report	Torres 81'; Doka 105+3'; Barcellos 120'

Campbelltown Sports Stadium, Sydney
Attendance: 2,827
Referee: Ammar Ebrahim Hasan Mahfoodh (Bahrain)

== Inter-zone play-off semi-finals ==
=== Summary ===
Draw for the Inter-zone play-off semi-finals was held on 28 December. In the Inter-zone play-off semi-finals, the four zonal winners other than the West Asia Zone play in two ties (the winners of the South Asia Zone (Group D), the winners of the Central Asia Zone (Group E), the winners of the East Asia Zone (Group I), and the winners of the ASEAN Zonal final. The matchups and order of legs will be decided by draw.

Team 1	Agg.	Team 2	1st leg	2nd leg
Abdysh-Ata Kant (Kyrgyzstan)	8–1	(Chinese Taipei) Taichung Futuro	5–0	3–1
Central Coast Mariners (Australia)	4–0	(India) Odisha	4–0	0–0

=== Matches ===
6 March 2024
18:00 UTC+6

Abdysh-Ata Kant (Kyrgyzstan)	5–0	(Chinese Taipei) Taichung Futuro
Zhyrgalbek uulu 14'; Batyrkanov 45+1'; Uzdenov 85'; Akhmataliev 87'; Çaryýew 90'	Report

Dolen Omurzakov Stadium, Bishkek
Attendance: 4,059
Referee: Bijan Heydari (Iran)
13 March 2024
16:00 UTC+8

Taichung Futuro (Chinese Taipei)	1–3	(Kyrgyzstan) Abdysh-Ata Kant
Estama 2'	Report	Musabekov 60'; Uzdenov 63'; Sarykbaev 81'

Nanzih Football Stadium, Kaohsiung
Attendance: 115
Referee: Yahya Almulla (United Arab Emirates)

Abdysh-Ata Kant won 8–1 on aggregate.

7 March 2024
19:00 UTC+11

Central Coast Mariners (Australia)	4–0	(India) Odisha
Doka 36', 77' (pen.); Roux 52'; Barcellos 89'	Report

Central Coast Stadium, Gosford
Attendance: 2,674
Referee: Qasim Al-Hatmi (Oman)
14 March 2024
15:30 UTC+5:30

Odisha (India)	0–0	(Australia) Central Coast Mariners
	Report

Kalinga Stadium, Bhubaneswar
Attendance: 2,711
Referee: Majed Mohammed Alshamrani (Saudi Arabia)

Central Coast Mariners won 4–0 on aggregate.

== Inter-zone play-off final ==
=== Summary ===
In the Inter-zone play-off final, the two winners of the Inter-zone play-off semi-finals will play each other, with the order of legs determined by the Inter-zone play-off semi-final draw. The winners of the Inter-zone play-off final advance to the final.

Team 1	Agg.	Team 2	1st leg	2nd leg
Abdysh-Ata Kant (Kyrgyzstan)	1–4	(Australia) Central Coast Mariners	1–1	0–3

=== Matches ===
17 April 2024
18:00 UTC+6

Abdysh-Ata Kant (Kyrgyzstan)	1–1	(Australia) Central Coast Mariners
Uzdenov 90+3'	Report	Kaltak 81'

Dolen Omurzakov Stadium, Bishkek
Attendance: 10,663
Referee: Gamini Nivon Robesh (Sri Lanka)
24 April 2024
19:00 UTC+10

Central Coast Mariners (Australia)	3–0	(Kyrgyzstan) Abdysh-Ata Kant
Di Pizio 77', 90+1'; Doka 86'	Report

Central Coast Stadium, Gosford
Attendance: 4,723
Referee: Kim Hee-gon (South Korea)

Central Coast Mariners won 4–1 on aggregate.

== Final ==
In the final, the winners of the West Asia Zonal final and the winners of the Inter-zone play-off final will play each other, with the host team (winners of the West Zone) alternated from the previous season's final.

5 May 2024
20:00 UTC+4

Al-Ahed (Lebanon)	0–1	(Australia) Central Coast Mariners
	Report	Kuol 84'

Sultan Qaboos Sports Complex, Muscat (Oman) (Note: Al Ahed played their home matches at a neutral venue due to the ongoing Israeli invasion of Lebanon.)
Attendance: 1,930
Referee: Omar Al-Ali (United Arab Emirates)
