= 2021–22 Central Coast Mariners FC season =

Central Coast Mariners
2021–22 season
- Chairman: Mike Charlesworth
- Manager: Nick Montgomery
- Stadium: Central Coast Stadium
- A-League Men: 5th
- A-League Men Finals Series: Elimination-finals
- FFA Cup: Runners-up
- Top goalscorer: League: Jason Cummings (10); All: Jason Cummings (10)
- Highest home attendance: 11,703 (7 May 2022 against Newcastle Jets)
- Lowest home attendance: 1,057 (19 March 2022 against Macarthur FC)
- Average home league attendance: 4,296
Home colours	Away colours	Third colours

The 2021–22 season is the 17th in the history of the Central Coast Mariners Football Club. This is the Central Coast Mariners' 17th season in the A-League. In addition to the domestic league, Central Coast also participated in the FFA Cup.

== Players ==
As of 13 November 2021

Note: Flags indicate national team as defined under FIFA eligibility rules; some limited exceptions apply. Players may hold more than one non-FIFA nationality.

No.	Pos.	Nation	Player
1	GK	AUS	Mark Birighitti
3	DF	AUS	Lewis Miller
4	MF	AUS	Josh Nisbet
5	DF	AUS	Noah Smith
7	MF	JPN	Cy Goddard
8	MF	AUS	Oliver Bozanic (captain)
9	FW	AUS	Jason Cummings
10	FW	BRA	Moresche
11	FW	FRA	Béni Nkololo
12	FW	CRC	Marco Ureña
14	DF	AUS	Kye Rowles

No.	Pos.	Nation	Player
15	DF	NZL	Storm Roux
16	MF	AUS	Max Balard (scholarship)
17	FW	AUS	Damian Tsekenis (scholarship)
18	DF	AUS	Jacob Farrell
19	FW	AUS	Matt Simon
21	DF	AUS	Ruon Tongyik
23	DF	FIJ	Dan Hall
24	GK	AUS	Yaren Sözer
25	DF	AUS	Matt Hatch (scholarship)
27	MF	GER	Nicolai Müller

== Transfers ==
=== Transfers in ===
No.	Position	Player	Transferred from	Type/fee	Contract length	Date	Ref
27	MF	(Germany) Nicolai Müller	Unattached	Free transfer	1 year	26 July 2021	
5	DF	Noah Smith	Unattached	Free transfer	1 year	28 July 2021	
7	MF	(Japan) Cy Goddard	Unattached	Free transfer	2 years	20 August 2021	
11	FW	(France) Béni Nkololo	Unattached	Free transfer	2 years	27 August 2021	
15	DF	(New Zealand) Storm Roux	Unattached	Free transfer	1 year	1 October 2021	
24	GK	Yaren Sözer	Unattached	Free transfer	1 year	8 October 2021	
10	FW	(Brazil) Moresche	Unattached	Free transfer	2 years	30 October 2021	
9	FW	(Australia) Jason Cummings	(Scotland) Dundee	Undisclosed	1.5 years	24 January 2022	

==== From academy squad ====
N	Pos.	Nat.	Name	Age	Notes
18	DF	(Australia)	Jacob Farrell	18	senior contract
17	FW	(Australia)	Damian Tsekenis	18	scholarship contract

=== Transfers out ===
No.	Position	Player	Transferred to	Type/fee	Date	Ref
29	FW	Alou Kuol	(Germany) VfB Stuttgart	Free transfer	16 April 2021	
3	DF	Jack Clisby	Perth Glory	End of contract	21 June 2021	
10	FW	Daniel De Silva	Macarthur FC	End of contract	24 June 2021	
14	MF	Daniel Bouman	Unattached	End of contract	1 July 2021	
26	MF	Jaden Casella	Unattached	End of contract	1 July 2021	
5	DF	Stefan Nigro	Melbourne Victory	End of contract	19 July 2021	
6	MF	(New Zealand) Gianni Stensness	(Norway) Viking	Undisclosed	9 August 2021	
22	MF	(Poland) Michał Janota	(Poland) Podbeskidzie	End of contract	16 August 2021	
7	MF	(Serbia) Stefan Janković	(Malta) Pembroke Athleta	End of contract	2 September 2021	
30	FW	Jordan Smylie	(Australia) Blacktown City	Mutual contract termination	23 September 2021	
20	GK	Adam Pearce	(Australia) Newcastle Olympic	End of contract	23 September 2021	
10	FW	Matthew Cahill	(Australia) APIA Leichhardt	Mutual contract termination	9 October 2021	

=== Contract extensions ===
No.	Name	Position	Duration	Date	Notes
14	Kye Rowles	Centre-back	2 years	16 June 2021	
1	Mark Birighitti	Goalkeeper	2 years	23 June 2021	
19	Matt Simon	Striker	1 year	24 June 2021	
23	(Fiji) Dan Hall	Defender	2 years	25 June 2021	
12	(Costa Rica) Marco Ureña	Striker	2 years	30 June 2021	
21	Ruon Tongyik	Centre-back	1 year	13 August 2021	
16	Max Balard	Midfielder	1 year	9 November 2021	upgraded to senior contract

== Pre-season and friendlies ==
23 October 2021	Western Sydney Wanderers	2–0 (a.e.t.)	Central Coast Mariners	Sydney
	Aquilina 58'; Swibel 76'	Report		Stadium: Wanderers Football Park; Attendance: 0 (behind closed doors)
Note: The two teams played for an extra 30 minutes after the match with no more goals scored

26 October 2021	Central Coast Mariners	3–1	Macarthur FC	Tuggerah
	Tongyik 20'; Ureña; Simon (pen.)	Report	La. Rose	Stadium: Central Coast Mariners Centre of Excellence; Attendance: 0 (behind closed doors)

2 November 2021	Central Coast Mariners	0–1	Wellington Phoenix	Sydney, Australia
11:00 AEDT		Report	Waine 38'	Stadium: Valentine Sports Park

6 November 2021	Sydney FC	0–3	Central Coast Mariners	Sydney, Australia
		Report	Ureña 53'; Tsekenis 80', 84'	Stadium: Macquarie University Fields

== Competitions ==
Win Draw Loss Cancelled or postponed

=== Overview ===
Competition	First match	Last match	Starting round	Final position	Record							
Competition	First match	Last match	Starting round	Final position	Pld	W	D	L	GF	GA	GD	Win %
A-League Men regular season	21 November 2021	7 May 2022	Matchday 1	5th	26	12	6	8	49	35	+14	46.15
A-League Men finals	15 May 2022	15 May 2022	Elimination finals	Elimination finals	1	0	0	1	1	3	−2	0.00
FFA Cup	13 November 2021	5 February 2022	Round of 32	2nd	5	4	0	1	11	3	+8	80.00
Total					32	16	6	10	61	41	+20	50.00

Last updated: 20 February 2022
Source: Competitions

=== A-League Men ===
==== League table ====
Pos	Team	Pld	W	D	L	GF	GA	GD	Pts	Qualification
3	Western United (C)	26	13	6	7	40	30	+10	45	Qualification for finals series (Note: The top two teams enter the finals series at the semi-finals, while the teams ranked third to sixth enter the finals series at the elimination-finals.)
4	Adelaide United	26	12	7	7	38	31	+7	43	Qualification for finals series
5	Central Coast Mariners	26	12	6	8	49	35	+14	42	Qualification for finals series
6	Wellington Phoenix (Note: Wellington Phoenix cannot qualify for Asian Football Confederation competitions as they are based in New Zealand, which is under the Oceania Football Confederation.)	26	12	3	11	34	49	−15	39	Qualification for finals series
7	Macarthur FC	26	9	6	11	38	47	−9	33	

Source: A-Leagues
Rules for classification: 1) Points; 2) Goal difference; 3) Goals scored; 4) Points per game; 5) Least red cards; 6) Least yellow cards; 7) Toss of a coin in an event of a tie of two clubs.
(C) Champions

==== Regular season ====
21 November 2021 1	Newcastle Jets	1–2	Central Coast Mariners	Newcastle
16:05 AEDT	Yuel 77'	Report	Nisbet 50'; Farrell 57'	Stadium: McDonald Jones Stadium; Attendance: 6,424; Referee: Kurt Ams

27 November 2021 2	Wellington Phoenix	2–1	Central Coast Mariners	Wollongong
17:05 AEDT	Hooper 48'; Sotirio 63'	Report	Ureña 52'	Stadium: Wollongong Showground; Attendance: 1,512; Referee: Jack Morgan

5 December 2021 3	Macarthur FC	1–0	Central Coast Mariners	Sydney
16:05 AEDT	Bozanic 45' (o.g.)	Report		Stadium: Panthers Stadium; Attendance: 3,014; Referee: Ben Abraham

12 December 2021 4	Central Coast Mariners	2–0	Sydney FC	Gosford
18:15 AEDT	Ureña 13'; Caceres 16' (o.g.)	Report		Stadium: Central Coast Stadium; Attendance: 6,037; Referee: Tim Danaskos

18 December 2021 5	Central Coast Mariners	2–0	Western Sydney Wanderers	Gosford
17:05 AEDT	Goddard 59'; Bozanic 90+7'	Report		Stadium: Central Coast Stadium; Attendance: 4,389; Referee: Lachlan Keevers

23 January 2022 6	Central Coast Mariners	1–3	Melbourne City	Gosford
16:05 AEDT	Ureña 41'	Report	Maclaren 18'; Nabbout 57'; Jenkinson 84'	Stadium: Central Coast Stadium; Attendance: 3,733; Referee: Stephen Lucas

30 January 2022 7	Sydney FC	3–2	Central Coast Mariners	Sydney
16:05 AEDT	Caceres 47' (pen.), 79'; Bobô 71'	Report	Bozanic 53'; Cummings 57'	Stadium: Leichhardt Oval; Attendance: 6,855; Referee: Kurt Ams

10 February 2022 8	Central Coast Mariners	3–3	Macarthur FC	Gosford
19:45 AEDT	Šušnjar 39' (o.g.); Bozanic 76' (pen.); Moresche 86' (pen.)	Report	Oar 25'; Mariappa 33'; Noone 90'	Stadium: Central Coast Stadium; Attendance: 2,732; Referee: Lachlan Keevers

13 February 2022 9	Central Coast Mariners	1–1	Perth Glory	Gosford
17:45 AEDT	Cummings 58'	Report	Stynes 90+3'	Stadium: Central Coast Stadium; Attendance: 3,936; Referee: Jonathan Barreiro

19 February 2022 10	Melbourne Victory	1–0	Central Coast Mariners	Melbourne
19:45 AEDT	Velupillay 90+4'	Report		Stadium: AAMI Park; Attendance: 8,017; Referee: Adam Kersey

22 February 2022 11	Melbourne City	3–2	Central Coast Mariners	Melbourne
19:55 AEDT	Maclaren 45+7' (pen.); Berenguer 57'; Tilio 74'	Report	Nkololo 45'; Bozanic 65'	Stadium: AAMI Park; Attendance: 2,587; Referee: Shaun Evans

26 February 2022 12	Adelaide United	2–1	Central Coast Mariners	Adelaide
19:45 AEDT	Ibuskui 52'; Irankunda 90+2'	Report	Nkololo 35'	Stadium: Coopers Stadium; Attendance: 7,868; Referee: Alex King

5 March 2022 13	Central Coast Mariners	2–1	Brisbane Roar	Gosford
17:05 AEDT	Nkololo 49'; Müller 55'	Report	Lescano 69'	Stadium: Central Coast Stadium; Attendance: 3,275; Referee: Chris Beath

9 March 2022 14	Central Coast Mariners	1–1	Melbourne Victory	Gosford
17:05 AEDT	Müller 84'	Report	D'Agostino 38'	Stadium: Central Coast Stadium; Attendance: 2,003; Referee: Stephen Lucas

15 March 2022 15	Perth Glory	0–0	Central Coast Mariners	Perth
22:05 AEDT		Report		Stadium: HBF Park; Attendance: 3,078; Referee: Alex King

19 March 2022 16	Central Coast Mariners	4–2	Macarthur FC	Mudgee
17:05 AEDT	Ureña 27', 80'; Hatch 48'; Smith 57'	Report	Mariappa 46'; La. Rose 88'	Stadium: Glen Willow Regional Sports Stadium; Attendance: 1,057; Referee: Ben Abraham

26 March 2022 17	Central Coast Mariners	3–0	Adelaide United	Gosford
19:45 AEDT	Ureña 77'; Cummings 90+1'; Hatch 90+3'	Report		Stadium: Central Coast Stadium; Attendance: 3,086; Referee: Alireza Faghani

2 April 2022 18	Western United	2–2	Central Coast Mariners	Ballarat
16:05 AEDT	Smith 46' (o.g.); Prijović 63'	Report	Cummings 36', 64'	Stadium: Eureka Stadium; Attendance: 1,423; Referee: Lachlan Keevers

5 April 2022 19	Central Coast Mariners	5–0	Wellington Phoenix	Gosford
19:05 AEST	Ureña 8' (pen.); Nkololo 24'; Cummings 55' (pen.); Kuol 68'; Hatch 90+3'	Report		Stadium: Central Coast Stadium; Attendance: 2,847; Referee: Daniel Elder

9 April 2022 20	Central Coast Mariners	0–5	Sydney FC	Gosford
19:45 AEST		Report	Le Fondre 28', 58', 59'; Caceres 53'; Bobô 90+4'	Stadium: Central Coast Stadium; Attendance: 5,773; Referee: Jonathon Barreiro

13 April 2022 21	Western Sydney Wanderers	2–2	Central Coast Mariners	Sydney
19:05 AEST	Rowles 41' (o.g.); Petratos 54'	Report	Nkololo 64' (pen.); Hall 90+5'	Stadium: CommBank Stadium; Attendance: 4,212; Referee: Ben Abraham

17 April 2022 22	Wellington Phoenix	0–4	Central Coast Mariners	Wellington
15:05 NZT		Report	Nkololo 25'; Cummings 62'; Moresche 65'; Hatch 90+6'	Stadium: Sky Stadium; Attendance: 18,184

23 April 2022 23	Newcastle Jets	2–4	Central Coast Mariners	Newcastle
19:45 AEST	Mauragis 46'; Farrell 50' (o.g.)	Report	Moresche 19'; Cummings 30', 34' (pen.); Kuol 90+1'	Stadium: McDonald Jones Stadium; Attendance: 6,202; Referee: Kurt Ams

30 April 2022 24	Central Coast Mariners	1–0	Western United	Gosford
16:05 AEST	Kuol 81'	Report		Stadium: Central Coast Stadium; Attendance: 5,273; Referee: Alex King

3 May 2022 25	Brisbane Roar	0–2	Central Coast Mariners	Kippa-Ring
19:05 AEST		Report	Miller 40'; Kuol 63'	Stadium: Moreton Daily Stadium; Attendance: 1,652; Referee: Tim Danaskos

7 May 2022 26	Central Coast Mariners	2–0	Newcastle Jets	Gosford
19:45 AEST	Cummings 30'; Nkololo 62'	Report		Stadium: Central Coast Stadium; Attendance: 11,703; Referee: Alireza Faghani

==== Finals series ====
15 May 2022 Elimination final	Adelaide United	3–1	Central Coast Mariners	Adelaide
15:35 ACST	Goodwin 26'; Yengi 67'; Oliveira 90+2'	Report	Roux 71'	Stadium: Coopers Stadium; Attendance: 10,113; Referee: Daniel Elder

=== FFA Cup ===
13 November 2021 Round of 32	Blacktown City	0–1	Central Coast Mariners	Mudgee
17:00 AEDT		Report	Nkololo 75'	Stadium: Glen Willow Regional Sports Stadium; Attendance: 1,046; Referee: Kurt Ams

1 December 2021 Round of 16	Wollongong Wolves	1–2	Central Coast Mariners	Wollongong
19:30 AEDT	Scott 23' (pen.)	Report	Moresche 64'; McCarthy 81'	Stadium: WIN Stadium; Attendance: 2,189; Referee: Tim Danaskos

21 December 2021 Quarter-final	APIA Leichhardt	0–6	Central Coast Mariners	Sydney
19:30		Report	Balard 8'; Hall 24'; Moresche 55'; Kuol 67'; Hatch 72'; Smith 88'	Stadium: Leichhardt Stadium; Attendance: 5,681; Referee: Kurt Ams

18 January 2022 Semi-final	Sydney FC	0–1	Central Coast Mariners	Sydney
19:00 AEDT		Report	Ureña 82' (pen.)	Stadium: Netstrata Jubilee Stadium; Attendance: 1,135; Referee: Alex King

5 February 2022 Final	Melbourne Victory	2–1	Central Coast Mariners	Melbourne
20:00 AEDT	Davidson 70'; Ikonomidis 90+5'	Report	Bozanic 90+7'	Stadium: AAMI Park; Attendance: 15,343; Referee: Shaun Evans

== Team statistics ==
=== Appearances and goals ===
Numbers in parentheses denote appearances as substitute.

No.	Pos.	Player	A-League Men				FFA Cup		Total	
No.	Pos.	Player	Regular season		Finals		FFA Cup		Total	
No.	Pos.	Player	Apps.	Goals	Apps.	Goals	Apps.	Goals	Apps.	Goals
1	GK	(Australia) Mark Birighitti	25	0	1	0	5	0	31	0
3	DF	(Australia) Lewis Miller	16+5	1	1	0	4	0	26	1
4	FW	(Australia) Josh Nisbet	22+2	1	0+1	0	5	0	30	1
5	DF	(Australia) Noah Smith	6+4	1	0	0	0+1	1	11	2
7	MF	(Japan) Cy Goddard	12+8	1	1	0	0+5	0	26	1
8	MF	(Australia) Oliver Bozanic	15	4	0	0	4	1	19	5
9	FW	(Australia) Jason Cummings	20	10	1	0	0	0	21	10
10	FW	(Brazil) Moresche	10+11	3	0	0	4+1	2	26	5
11	MF	(France) Béni Nkololo	18+4	7	1	0	3+1	1	27	8
12	FW	(Costa Rica) Marco Ureña	20+5	7	1	0	3+1	1	29	8
14	DF	(Australia) Kye Rowles	24	0	1	0	5	0	29	0
15	DF	(New Zealand) Storm Roux	9+8	0	0+1	1	2+1	0	21	1
16	MF	(Australia) Max Balard	14+6	0	1	0	3+1	1	25	1
17	FW	(Australia) Damian Tsekenis	1+2	0	0	0	1+2	0	6	0
18	DF	(Australia) Jacob Farrell	24	1	1	0	5	0	30	1
19	FW	(Australia) Matt Simon	0	0	0	0	1	0	1	0
21	DF	(Australia) Ruon Tongyik	7+2	0	0	0	0	0	9	0
23	DF	(Fiji) Dan Hall	20+3	1	0	0	4	1	27	2
24	GK	(Australia) Yaren Sözer	1	0	0	0	0+1	0	2	0
25	DF	(Australia) Matt Hatch	2+12	4	0+1	0	1+2	1	18	5
27	MF	(Germany) Nicolai Müller	8+9	2	0+1	0	1	0	19	2
28	MF	(Australia) James Bayliss	1+5	0	0	0	0	0	6	0
29	FW	(Australia) Manyluak Aguek	0+1	0	0	0	0	0	1	0
33	MF	(Australia) Harry McCarthy	1+3	0	0	0	1+1	1	6	1
34	MF	(Australia) Harrison Steele	8+14	0	1	0	3+1	0	27	0
35	DF	(Australia) Cameron Windust	2+2	0	1	0	0	0	5	0
36	MF	(Australia) Garang Kuol	0+8	4	0+1	0	0+3	1	12	5
46	MF	(Australia) Dor Jok	0+3	0	0	0	0	0	3	0
50	GK	(Australia) Lawrence Caruso	0+1	0	0	0	0	0	1	0

== See also ==
- 2021–22 in Australian soccer
- List of Central Coast Mariners FC seasons
