= Jacob Farrell =

Australian soccer player (born 2002)

Personal information
- Full name: Jacob Brett Farrell
- Date of birth: 19 November 2002 (age 23)
- Place of birth: Gosford, Australia
- Height: 1.80 m (5 ft 11 in)
- Position: Left back

Team information
- Current team: Sydney FC (on loan from Portsmouth)
- Number: 5

Youth career
- Wyoming FC
- 2015–2020: CCM Academy

Senior career*
Years	Team	Apps	(Gls)
2020	CCM Academy	7	(0)
2021	Valentine FC	4	(0)
2021	CCM Academy	8	(0)
2021–2024	Central Coast Mariners	75	(5)
2024–	Portsmouth	2	(0)
2026	→ Western Sydney Wanderers (loan)	7	(0)
2026–	→ Sydney FC (loan)	0	(0)

International career^{‡}
2022–2024	Australia U23	8	(0)
- * Club domestic league appearances and goals as of 16:48, 23 April 2026 (UTC) ‡ National team caps and goals as of 3 May 2024

Jacob Brett Farrell (born 19 November 2002) is an Australian professional soccer player who plays as a left back for A-League Men club Sydney FC on loan from EFL Championship club Portsmouth.

== Club career ==
=== Central Coast Mariners ===
Farrell signed a senior contract with Central Coast Mariners in November 2021, aged eighteen, after 6 years with the Central Coast Mariners Academy. He made his first-team debut for the Mariners in a win over Blacktown City in the 2021 FFA Cup on 13 November 2021.

He made his A-League Men debut on 21 November 2021 in an F3 Derby against Newcastle Jets and scored a header in a 2–1 win. Farrell went on to be a regular starter for the Mariners in their 2021–22 season.

Farrell came on as a substitute in the second half of the 2023 A-League Men Grand Final. Within fifteen minutes of coming on, Farrell earned two penalties for the Mariners, both of which were scored by Jason Cummings as the Mariners won 6–1 to claim the A-League Men Championship.

On 1 May 2024, Farrell scored with a header in an eventual 2–0 win over Adelaide United to secure the 2023–24 A-League Men Premiership for the Mariners. Five days later, Farrell played in the Mariners win in the 2024 AFC Cup final. Farrell played a full game for the Mariners in their win in the 2024 A-League Men Grand Final and set up a late goal for Ryan Edmondson to seal the victory for the Mariners' third trophy of the season.

=== Portsmouth ===
On 26 July 2024, Farrell joined English Championship club Portsmouth for an undisclosed fee, signing a four-year deal.

==== Western Sydney Wanderers (loan) ====
On 7 February 2026, Farrell joined A-League Men side Western Sydney Wanderers on loan until the end of the 2025–26 A-League season.

==== Sydney FC (loan) ====
On 16 September 2026, Farrell joined Sydney FC on loan, with an option to make the move permanent at the end of the 2026–27 season.

== International career ==
Farrell was called up to the Australian under-23 side for the 2022 AFC U-23 Asian Cup in June 2022. In June 2023, he took part in the Maurice Revello Tournament in France with Australia.

== Career statistics ==
=== Club ===
As of 20 March 2026

Appearances and goals by club, season and competition
Club	Season	League			National cup (Note: Includes Australia Cup)		League cup (Note: Includes EFL Cup)		Continental		Other		Total	
Club	Season	Division	Apps	Goals	Apps	Goals	Apps	Goals	Apps	Goals	Apps	Goals	Apps	Goals
Central Coast Mariners Academy	2020	NPL NSW 2	7	0	—		—		—		—		7	0
Valentine	2021	NPL Northern NSW	4	0	0	0	—		—		—		4	0
Central Coast Mariners Academy	2021	NPL NSW 2	8	0	—		—		—		8	0		
Central Coast Mariners	2021–22	A-League Men	25	1	5	0	—		—		—		30	1
Central Coast Mariners	2022–23	A-League Men	25	2	1	0	—		—		—		26	2
Central Coast Mariners	2023–24	A-League Men	25	2	1	0	—		10	2	—		36	2
Central Coast Mariners	Total		75	5	7	0	—		10	2	—		92	7
Portsmouth F.C.	2024–25	Championship	1	0	—		—		—		—		1	0
Portsmouth F.C.	2025–26	Championship	1	0	—		1	0	—		—		2	0
Portsmouth F.C.	Total		2	0	—		1	0	—		—		3	0
Western Sydney Wanderers (loan)	2025–26	A-League Men	7	0	—		—		—		0	0	7	0
Sydney FC (loan)	2026–27	A-League Men	0	0	—		—		—		0	0	0	0
Career total			103	5	7	0	1	0	10	2	0	0	121	7

== Honours ==
Central Coast Mariners

- A-League Men Championship: 2022–23, 2023–24
- A-League Men Premiership: 2023–24
- AFC Cup / AFC Champions League Two: 2023–24

Individual

- PFA A-League Team of the Season: 2023–24

== See also ==
- List of Central Coast Mariners FC players
- List of Portsmouth F.C. players
