= Christian Theoharous =

Australian soccer player

Personal information
- Date of birth: 6 December 1999 (age 26)
- Place of birth: Melbourne, Australia
- Height: 1.76 m (5 ft 9 1/2 in)
- Position: Winger

Team information
- Current team: Heidelberg United
- Number: 11

Youth career
- 2006–2012: Bentleigh Greens
- 2012–2013: FFV NTC
- 2014–2017: Melbourne Victory

Senior career*
Years	Team	Apps	(Gls)
2015–2017	Melbourne Victory NPL	23	(11)
2017–2018	Melbourne Victory	19	(1)
2018–2021	Borussia Mönchengladbach II	26	(4)
2021–2023	Western United	4	(0)
2022	Western United NPL	9	(1)
2023–2026	Central Coast Mariners	79	(4)
2026–	Heidelberg United	9	(1)

International career^{‡}
2017–2018	Australia U20	5	(0)
- * Club domestic league appearances and goals as of 1 September 2026 ‡ National team caps and goals as of 30 October 2018

Christian Theoharous (Greek: Κρίστιαν Θεοχάρους, pronounced [θe.oˈxa.ru̯s]; born 6 December 1999) is an Australian professional footballer who plays as a winger for NPL Victoria club Heidelberg United.

== Early life ==
Theoharous was born in Melbourne, Victoria to a Cypriot father and Australian mother of Greek descent. His father, Andrew Theoharous, was born in Pegeia, Cyprus and was a former footballer in the National Soccer League for Marconi and later for Bentleigh Greens, whom he captained for a decade. Like his father, Theoharous joined Bentleigh Greens at the age of six before eventually moving to the Victoria National Training Centre (FFV NTC).

== Club career ==
=== Melbourne Victory ===
On 27 February 2017, Theoharous signed with Melbourne Victory FC as a scholarship player, after having been part of the Victory's youth team since 2014.

Theoharous made his Victory debut in 2017 as an 83rd minute substitute for Daniel Georgievski in a 1–0 loss to Brisbane Roar. Theoharous scored his debut first team goal for the Victory against the Central Coast Mariners on 18 March 2018.

Despite becoming a regular first-team player in the 2017–18 season, he missed Victory's victorious Grand Final finish to the season after getting injured in the semi-final.

=== Borussia Mönchengladbach ===
Borussia Mönchengladbach announced that he had signed for the club on their official website on 18 May 2018.

Theoharous spent three seasons at the club, playing for their reserve team in the fourth tier of German football, before he was released by Borussia Mönchengladbach in June 2021.

=== Western United ===
On 1 November 2021, Theoharous joined Australian A-League Men club Western United on a two-year scholarship deal. Theoharous made 4 league appearances for Western United before the club and player agreed to a mutual termination of his contract on 17 January 2023, midway through the second season of his two year deal.

=== Central Coast Mariners ===
In January 2023, after agreeing a mutual termination of his contract with Western United, Theoharous signed with Central Coast Mariners until the end of the season, with an extension option. Theoharous made his debut for the club at the first game since his signing, appearing off the substitute's bench against Wellington Phoenix.

Theoharous was part of the 2022-23 A-League Championship winning team for the Mariners, in his first season at the club.

Midway through the 2023-24 season, Theoharous signed a one-year contract extension. Theoharous was part of the Mariners' Championship, Premiership and AFC Cup winning 2023-24 season.

Over the next two seasons, Theoharous battled injuries and patches of poor form, and he was released by the Mariners at the end of the 2025-26 season.

=== Heidelberg United ===
Having fallen out of favour with A-League clubs, Theoharous dropped back to the NPL Victoria competition, signing with Heidelberg United for the second half of the 2026 season.

== Career statistics ==
As of 1 March 2024

Appearances and goals by club, season and competition
Club	Season	League			National cup (Note: Includes Australia Cup)		Continental		Total	
Club	Season	Division	Apps	Goals	Apps	Goals	Apps	Goals	Apps	Goals
Melbourne Victory NPL	2016	National Premier Leagues Victoria	10	1	—		—		10	1
Melbourne Victory NPL	2017	National Premier Leagues Victoria	11	6	—		—		11	6
Melbourne Victory NPL	Total		21	7	0	0	0	0	21	7
Melbourne Victory	2016–17	A-League	1	0	0	0	—		1	0
Melbourne Victory	2017–18	A-League	18	1	0	0	6	0	24	1
Melbourne Victory	Total		19	1	0	0	6	0	25	1
Borussia Mönchengladbach II	2018–19	Regionalliga West	6	0	—		—		6	0
Borussia Mönchengladbach II	2019–20	Regionalliga West	14	3	—		—		14	3
Borussia Mönchengladbach II	2020–21	Regionalliga West	6	1	—		—		6	1
Borussia Mönchengladbach II	Total		26	4	0	0	0	0	26	4
Western United	2021–22	A-League Men	4	0	1	0	—		5	0
Western United	2022–23	A-League Men	0	0	0	0	—		0	0
Western United	Total		4	0	1	0	0	0	5	0
Central Coast Mariners	2022–23	A-League Men	17	0	—		—		17	0
Central Coast Mariners	2023–24	A-League Men	16	2	1	0	8	2	25	4
Central Coast Mariners	Total		33	2	1	0	8	2	42	4
Career total			103	14	2	0	14	2	119	16

== Honours ==
Central Coast Mariners

- A-League Men Championship: 2022–23, 2023-24
- A-League Men Premiership: 2023-24
- AFC Cup: 2023-24
