= Nathan Paull =

Australian soccer player

Personal information
- Date of birth: 21 August 2003 (age 23)
- Place of birth: Sydney, New South Wales, Australia
- Height: 1.93 m (6 ft 4 in)
- Position: Central defender

Team information
- Current team: Macarthur FC
- Number: 21

Youth career
- Heathcote Waratah FC
- 2020–2023: Sydney FC

Senior career*
Years	Team	Apps	(Gls)
2023	Sydney FC NPL	19	(3)
2023	CCM Academy	3	(0)
2023–2026	Central Coast Mariners	52	(2)
2026–	Macarthur FC	0	(0)

International career^{‡}
2025–	Australia U23	5	(2)
- * Club domestic league appearances and goals as of 3 May 2026 ‡ National team caps and goals as of 10 September 2025

Nathan Paull (born 21 August 2003) is an Australian professional soccer player who plays as a central defender for Macarthur FC.

== Early life ==
Paull was born on 21 August 2003 in Sydney, New South Wales, having grown up in the suburb of Heathcote in Southern Sydney. He is of English, Italian and Ukrainian descent.

== Club career ==
Paull came through the pathways at Wollongong Wolves FC, before being spotted by Sydney FC's academy to join their youth set up as a 17 year old in 2020. Ahead of the 2023 NPL season, Paull was promoted into Sydney FC's NPL first grade team.

=== Central Coast Mariners ===
Having made 19 appearances in the NPL for Sydney FC's youth team, including scoring three goals and winning the Defender of the Month award in April, Paull was scouted and signed by the Central Coast Mariners on a scholarship deal in June 2023. Paull made his senior debut for the Mariners in the 2023 Australia Cup round of 32 tie against former club Sydney FC, in his hometown of Wollongong.

Paull made his A-League debut in the first round of the 2023-24 season and was upgraded to a full A-League contract on 25 October 2023, having played every minute of the Mariners season to that point of the season across the A-League, Australia Cup and AFC Cup.

Paull was part of the Mariners' 2023–24 Premiership, 2023–24 Championship and 2023–24 AFC Cup winning season, his first season in professional football.

Paull started the 2025-26 season rotating the captaincy of the Mariners with Brad Tapp in the injury-enforced absence of regular captain Trent Sainsbury, however soon fell out of favour behind Tapp and James Donachie for his regular Centre Back position. At the end of the season, Paull announced he would be leaving the club.

=== Macarthur FC ===
Paull joined Macarthur FC for the 2026-27 season.

== Honours ==
Central Coast Mariners

- A-League Men Premiership: 2023–24
- A-League Men Championship: 2023–24
- AFC Cup: 2023–24
