= Ángel Torres (footballer, born 2000) =

Colombian footballer

Personal information
- Full name: Ángel Yesid Torres Quiñones
- Date of birth: 6 April 2000 (age 26)
- Place of birth: Bogotá, Colombia
- Height: 1.82 m (6 ft 0 in)
- Position: Winger

Team information
- Current team: Operário Ferroviário (on loan from Dynamo Kyiv)
- Number: 7

Youth career
- –2018: Real Academia
- 2018–2019: Porto

Senior career*
Years	Team	Apps	(Gls)
2019–2021	Porto B	20	(1)
2021–2022	Alverca	26	(4)
2022–2023	Balzan	23	(15)
2023–2024	Central Coast Mariners	23	(13)
2025–	Dynamo Kyiv	1	(0)
2026	→ Eyüpspor (loan)	11	(0)
2026–	→ Operário Ferroviário (loan)	8	(1)
- * Club domestic league appearances and goals as of 18 November 2026

Ángel Yesid Torres Quiñones (born 6 April 2000) is a Colombian professional footballer who plays as a winger for Brazilian club Operário Ferroviário, on loan from Ukrainian club Dynamo Kyiv.

== Career ==
=== Balzan ===
On 22 June 2022, Torres joined Balzan F.C. of the Maltese Premier League. In his only season with the club he scored 15 league goals and provided 6 assists, helping his team secure qualification to the UEFA Conference League.

=== Central Coast Mariners ===
On 30 August 2023, recently crowned A-League champions Central Coast Mariners announced the signing of Torres on a two-year contract. Torres made his debut for the club in an away AFC Cup fixture against Malaysian club Terengganu FC, and his league debut in the Mariners first game of the new season as defending champions, against Adelaide United in Adelaide. In the Mariners third game of the league season against Perth Glory in Perth, Torres was given a straight red card for slapping an opposition player, Jacob Muir, in the back of the head.

On 17 December 2023, in his seventh league appearance for the club, Torres scored his first hat-trick for the club against Melbourne City at AAMI Park.

On 8 April 2024, Torres' manager tweeted that he would not be renewing his contract with the Mariners for a second season, and had offers from clubs in 15 countries.

==== Legal Issues ====
Later that month, on 23 April 2024, it was revealed that Torres had been arrested by NSW Police. He was taken to Gosford Police Station where he was charged with two counts of common assault, intimidation and aggravated sexual intercourse without consent. He has since been released on bail. Torres was stood down by the Mariners.

On 4 April 2025, Torres was found not guilty of all charges against him.

=== Dynamo Kyiv ===
Following his acquittal of all charges in Australia, on 6 May 2025, Torres joined Ukrainian Premier League leaders, Dynamo Kyiv on a 3-year contract.

==== Eyüpspor loan ====
On 17 January 2026, Torres joined Süper Lig club Eyüpspor on loan for the remainder of the season.

==== Operário Ferroviário ====
On 8 August 2026, Torres joined Série B club Operário Ferroviário on loan until 30 June 2027.

== Career statistics ==
As of match played 19 January 2026

Club	Season	League			National cup (Note: Includes Maltese FA Trophy)		Continental		Total	
Club	Season	Division	Apps	Goals	Apps	Goals	Apps	Goals	Apps	Goals
Porto B	2019–20	LigaPro	16	1	—		—		16	1
Porto B	2020-21	LigaPro	4	0	—		—		4	0
Alverca	2020–21	Campeonato de Portugal	14	2	—		—		14	2
Alverca	2021-22	Liga 3	12	2	0	0	—		12	2
Balzan	2022–23	Maltese Premier League	23	15	2	1	—		25	16
Balzan	2023–24	Maltese Premier League	0	0	0	0	4 (Note: Appearances in UEFA Conference League)	0	4	0
Central Coast Mariners	2023–24	A-League Men	23	13	0	0	10 (Note: Appearances in AFC Cup)	2	33	15
Dynamo Kyiv	2024–25	Ukrainian Premier League	0	0	0	0	0	0	0	0
Dynamo Kyiv	2025–26	Ukrainian Premier League	1	0	0	0	1	0	2	0
Dynamo Kyiv	Total		1	0	0	0	1	0	2	0
Eyüpspor (loan)	2025–26	Süper Lig	1	0	0	0	-		1	0
Career total			94	33	2	1	15	2	111	36

== Honours ==
=== Club ===
FC Porto

- UEFA Youth League: 2018–19
