= Damian Tsekenis =

Australian soccer player

Personal information
- Date of birth: 16 April 2001 (age 25)
- Place of birth: Fairfield, New South Wales, Australia
- Position: Forward

Team information
- Current team: Marconi Stallions

Youth career
- –2014: Bonnyrigg White Eagles
- 2015–2017: St George FC
- 2018–2019: Marconi Stallions
- 2020–2022: Central Coast Mariners

Senior career*
Years	Team	Apps	(Gls)
2019	Marconi Stallions	6	(1)
2020–2022	CCM Academy	20	(16)
2021–2022	Central Coast Mariners	3	(0)
2025–	Marconi Stallions	37	(11)
- * Club domestic league appearances and goals as of 19 December 2025

Damian Tsekenis (born 16 April 2001) is an Australian professional footballer who plays as a forward for NPL New South Wales club Marconi Stallions.

== Early life ==
Tsekenis was born on 16 April 2001 in Fairfield, New South Wales to Peter and Denise Tsekenis. His father is of Greek descent and was a former footballer in the National Soccer League. His mother was also a former footballer who played as a striker for the Australian Schoolgirls' team.

== Club career ==
=== Marconi Stallions ===
Tsekenis began his football career at Marconi Stallions where he initially started in the club's under-18s squad. He scored on his first-team debut on 9 June 2019 in a 5–2 victory over Sydney FC Youth, and made a further five league appearances for Marconi. He also scored a goal in a 3–0 away victory in a Round of 32 cup match against South Hobart. Marconi progressed through to the Round of 16 for the first time in the club's competition history.

=== Central Coast Mariners ===
Tsekenis signed for Central Coast Mariners during the 2018–19 Y-League season. During his time with Central Coast Mariners Academy, he sustained a fractured hand, necessitating a 12-week absence from play. Subsequently, he experienced an infection during his rehabilitation process and later incurred a medial collateral ligament tear, just two days into the pre-season, resulting in an additional 7-week hiatus.

Tsekenis signed his first professional contract with the Mariners in November 2021 and was promoted to the first-team squad. He made his A-League debut (and starting debut) for the club at Wollongong Showground on 27 November 2021 in a 2–1 league defeat to Wellington Phoenix. Tsekenis made his last appearance for the Mariners on 5 March 2022 against Brisbane Roar, making a total of three league appearances during the 2021–22 season.

=== Doping ban ===
On 10 November 2023, it was publicly announced that a Sport Integrity Australia investigation had found that Tsekenis used banned substances, Ibutamoren and Enobosarm, and had also engaged in the use or attempted use of RAD140 and Ligandrol. These four substances are prohibited due to their performance-enhancing nature, with effects similar to anabolic steroids. He received a two-year and nine-month suspension, backdated to expire on 21 December 2024. Tsekenis had been provisionally serving since 21 March 2022, having returned "Adverse Analytical Findings from an out-of-competition doping control test" two days later.

=== Marconi Stallions ===
Following the expiry of his doping ban, on 16 January 2025, it was announced that Tsekenis had signed for his former club for the 2025 NPL NSW season, where his father, Peter, is still the head coach of the team.
