= Alou Kuol =

Australian soccer player (born 2001)

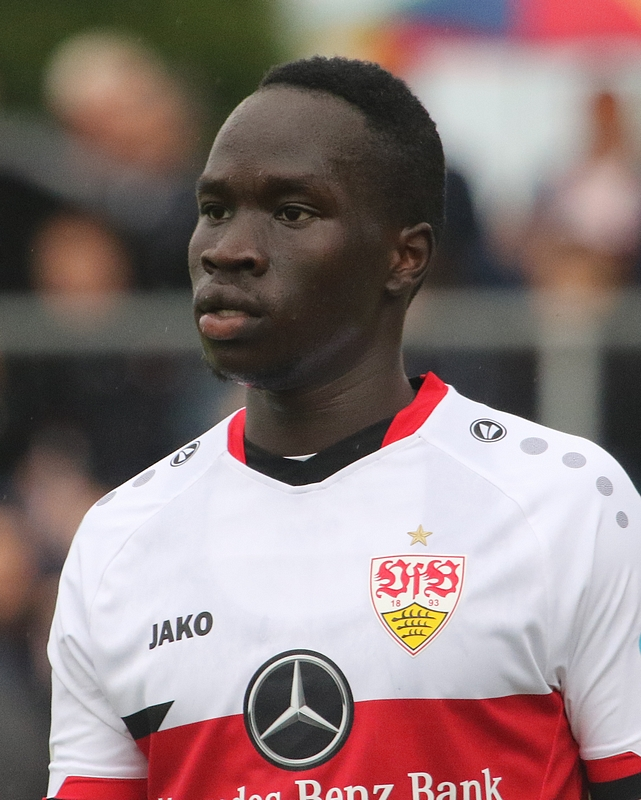
- Kuol playing for VfB Stuttgart II in 2021

Personal information
- Full name: Alou Mawien Kuol
- Date of birth: 5 July 2001 (age 25)
- Place of birth: Khartoum, Sudan
- Height: 1.84 m (6 ft 0 in)
- Position: Striker

Team information
- Current team: Blacktown City

Youth career
- Shepparton Soccer Club
- 2014–2017: Goulburn Valley Suns

Senior career*
Years	Team	Apps	(Gls)
2017–2019	Goulburn Valley Suns	46	(28)
2019–2020	CCM Academy	9	(6)
2020–2021	Central Coast Mariners	30	(7)
2021–2023	VfB Stuttgart II	32	(7)
2022	→ SV Sandhausen (loan)	1	(0)
2022–2023	VfB Stuttgart	1	(0)
2023–2025	Central Coast Mariners	53	(9)
2025–2026	Western Sydney Wanderers	14	(1)
2026–	Blacktown City	9	(3)

International career^{‡}
2022–	Australia U23	14	(5)
Medal record
Men's football
Representing Australia
WAFF U-23 Championship
Runner-up	2024 Saudi Arabia
- * Club domestic league appearances and goals as of 31 August 2026 ‡ National team caps and goals as of 27 March 2024

Alou Mawien Kuol (Dinka: [aˈlu maˈwiɛn kwɔl]; born 5 July 2001) is an Australian soccer player who plays for Blacktown City in the National Premier Leagues NSW competition. Born in Sudan, he represented Australia at youth level.

== Early life ==
Alou Kuol was born in Khartoum to South Sudanese parents, and has five younger brothers and an older brother, who he credits for forcing him to relocate for soccer when he first joined the Mariners Academy. Kuol's family fled Sudan when he was three, staying in Egypt for a year before arriving in Sydney. In 2015, Kuol moved to Shepparton, where he later worked as a kitchen hand while playing youth football.

== Club career ==
=== Central Coast Mariners ===
Kuol began his senior career with Victorian side Goulburn Valley Suns, after coming through the side's youth teams. Kuol trialled with A-League clubs Melbourne Victory and Western United but was unsuccessful in receiving a contract. He signed for Central Coast Mariners in late-2019, initially playing for the youth team in the Y-League. Kuol also briefly trialed with Portuguese club Sporting CP in their under-19 squad.

Kuol made his professional debut as a substitute on 1 March 2020 in the Mariners' 6–2 defeat against Western United. Three days later, Kuol was awarded a scholarship with the Mariners, extending to the end of the 2020–21 season. He made his starting debut for the Mariners in a goalless draw against Newcastle Jets on 24 July 2020, and received media attention for his colourful post-match interview.

=== VfB Stuttgart ===
On 16 April 2021, following interest from several top European teams, Kuol signed a 4-year contract with VfB Stuttgart, signing until June 2025. Delegated to VfB Stuttgart II, Kuol scored seven goals in his first 13 appearances with the reserve side, leading second in the goalscoring charts for the Regionalliga Südwest by November.

On 31 January 2022, Kuol was loaned to SV Sandhausen until the end of the season. He made his debut on 30 April 2022 in a 2–1 defeat to Schalke, in which he was sent off in the 5th-minute of added time, after a challenge on Thomas Ouwejan. Kuol was suspended for three games, missing the remaining matches of the league season.

On his return to Stuttgart, Kuol made his Bundesliga debut on 27 January 2023 in a 2–1 defeat to RB Leipzig.

=== Return to Central Coast Mariners ===
On 10 July 2023, Kuol signed a three-year deal to return with Central Coast Mariners. He made his returning debut in the A-League on 20 October 2023 in a 3–0 loss against Adelaide United at Coopers Stadium. Kuol was taken off in the 34th minute of the match after suffering a knee injury from a challenge on Alexandar Popovic; doctors tested for an ACL injury but concluded it to be a knock.

Kuol was part of the Mariners' Championship, Premiership and AFC Cup winning 2023-24 season. Kuol scored the only goal of the 2024 AFC Cup final in the 84th minute against Al Ahed.

At the end of the 2024-25 season, Kuol left the Mariners.

=== Western Sydney Wanderers ===
For the 2025–26 A-League Men season, Kuol joined Western Sydney Wanderers, re-uniting with his former head coach from his first stint at the Mariners, Alen Stajcic.

Kuol started the season as a regular starter for the Wanderers, however soon fell out of favour, only making one appearance off the bench in April after losing his place in mid-January, and was released at the end of the season.

=== Blacktown City ===
Having fallen out of favour with A-League clubs, Kuol dropped back to the National Premier Leagues NSW competition for the second half of its 2026 season, signing with Blacktown City.

== International career ==
In May 2022, Kuol was selected in the Australian under-23 team for the 2022 AFC U-23 Asian Cup. He scored in Australia's second game of the group stage, netting the opening goal with a scorpion kick in a 1–1 draw with Iraq. Kuol was named as a Puskás award nominee on 13 January 2023 for his strike at Markaziy Stadium.

== Personal life ==
Kuol's younger brother, Garang, plays for Sparta Prague. Another younger brother, Teng Kuol, currently plays for Sydney Olympic, after previously playing for the Central Coast Mariners Academy, Western Sydney Wanderers FC Youth and Melbourne Victory FC Youth.

== Career statistics ==
As of 24 May 2025

Appearances and goals by club, season and competition
Club	Season	League			National cup (Note: Includes Australia Cup)		Continental		Total	
Club	Season	Division	Apps	Goals	Apps	Goals	Apps	Goals	Apps	Goals
Goulburn Valley Suns	2017	NPL Victoria 2	5	0	0	0	—		5	0
Goulburn Valley Suns	2018	NPL Victoria 2	15	6	2	0	—		17	6
Goulburn Valley Suns	2019	NPL Victoria 2	26	22	1	0	—		27	22
Goulburn Valley Suns	Total		46	28	3	0	0	0	49	28
Central Coast Mariners	2019–20	A-League	4	0	0	0	—		4	0
Central Coast Mariners	2020–21	A-League	26	7	—		—		26	7
Central Coast Mariners	Total		30	7	0	0	0	0	30	7
Central Coast Mariners Academy	2020	NPL NSW 2	9	6	—		—		9	6
VfB Stuttgart II	2021–22	Regionalliga	18	7	—		—		18	7
VfB Stuttgart II	2022–23	Regionalliga	14	0	—		—		14	0
VfB Stuttgart II	Total		32	7	0	0	0	0	32	7
SV Sandhausen (loan)	2021–22	2. Bundesliga	1	0	0	0	—		1	0
VfB Stuttgart	2022–23	Bundesliga	1	0	0	0	0	0	1	0
Central Coast Mariners	2023–24	A-League Men	28	5	1	1	9 (Note: Appearances in AFC Cup)	3	38	9
Central Coast Mariners	2024–25	A-League Men	25	4	2	1	8 (Note: Appearances in AFC Champions League)	1	35	6
Central Coast Mariners	Total		53	9	3	2	17	4	73	15
Career total			172	57	6	2	17	4	195	63

== Honours ==
Central Coast Mariners

- A-League Men Championship: 2023–24
- A-League Men Premiership: 2023–24
- AFC Cup: 2023–24

Australia U-23

- WAFF U-23 Championship: runner-up 2024

Individual

- National Premier Leagues Victoria 2 top scorer: 2019
- WAFF U-23 Championship top scorer: 2024

== See also ==
- List of Central Coast Mariners FC players
