= Storm Roux =

New Zealand footballer

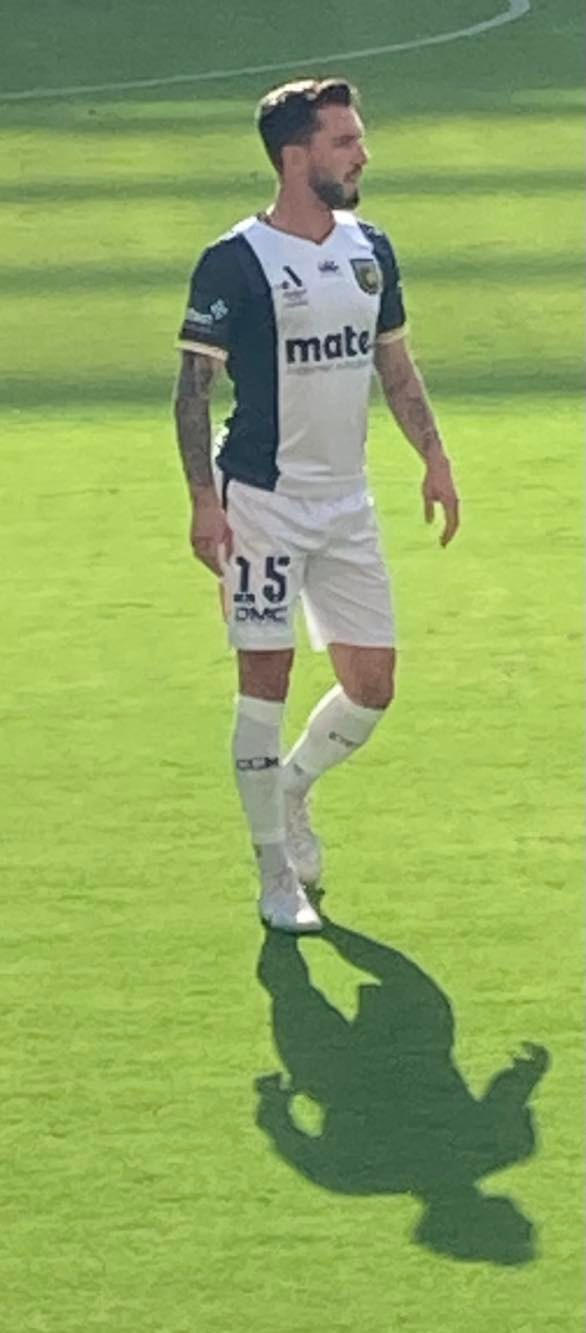
- Roux playing for Central Coast Mariners in 2023

Personal information
- Full name: Storm James Roux
- Date of birth: 13 January 1993 (age 33)
- Place of birth: Somerset West, South Africa
- Height: 1.81 m (5 ft 11 in)
- Position: Right back

Team information
- Current team: Central Coast Mariners
- Number: 15

Youth career
- 2007–2010: Sorrento
- 2009–2012: WA NTC
- 2010–2013: Perth Glory

Senior career*
Years	Team	Apps	(Gls)
2013	Perth Glory	1	(0)
2013–2018	Central Coast Mariners	105	(2)
2018–2021	Melbourne Victory	72	(4)
2021–	Central Coast Mariners	120	(3)

International career^{‡}
2013	New Zealand U20	8	(0)
2015	New Zealand U23	3	(0)
2013–	New Zealand	18	(0)
Medal record
Men's football
Representing New Zealand
OFC U-20 Championship
Winner	2013 Fiji	U20 Team
- * Club domestic league appearances and goals as of 22 November 2026 ‡ National team caps and goals as of 18 November 2025

Storm James Roux (/ruː/ ROO; French: [ʁu]; born 13 January 1993) is a professional footballer who plays as a right back for A-League Men club Central Coast Mariners. Born in South Africa, he plays for the New Zealand national team.

Roux played youth football with Sorrento, Football West National Training Centre and Perth Glory youth before making his professional debut with Perth Glory. In 2013, he joined Central Coast Mariners, where he made over 100 appearances before joining Melbourne Victory in 2018. He returned to Central Coast Mariners in 2021.

Roux made his debut for the New Zealand national team in 2013, having previously represented New Zealand U-20, including at the 2013 FIFA U-20 World Cup.

== Early life ==
Roux was born in South Africa but moved to New Zealand aged three. He later moved again, to Australia, in his early teens. Despite his multinational childhood, Storm has stated that he considers himself to be primarily a New Zealander, but retains ties to all three nations. In New Zealand, Roux attended Mount Albert Grammar School.

== Club career ==
=== Early years ===
Roux played junior football for Sorrento after arriving in Australia, before joining Football West National Training Centre and Perth Glory Youth. He played for Football West National Training Centre in the Western Australia State League Premier Division in 2012, in which the NTC was a non-competitive team (unable to receive competition points).

=== Perth Glory ===
On 26 January 2013, Roux made his A-League debut, coming on as a substitute in Perth Glory's 1–0 loss to Brisbane Roar. Roux came close to scoring with a stinging shot in the 75th minute and coach Ian Ferguson was pleased with his performance saying post match, "I thought Storm Roux did well when he came on". He was subsequently moved to the senior squad for the remainder of the 2012–13 season, having spent the previous three seasons in the Glory's youth team.

=== Central Coast Mariners ===
On 8 June 2013, Roux signed a two-year deal with reigning A-League Champions Central Coast Mariners. His competitive debut came in the Mariners' first game of the 2013–14 season, a 1–1 draw with Western Sydney Wanderers, with Roux earning praise from coach Graham Arnold for his performance. He scored his first goal for the club and the only goal of the game in a win over Wellington Phoenix in December 2013 with a calm finish from close-range. Strong performances saw Roux named the December nominee for the A-League Young Footballer of the Year award for 2013–14. The award was eventually given to Adam Taggart. Roux had a solid first season for the Mariners, becoming a regular member of the starting side under new coach Phil Moss. In July 2014, Roux signed a new contract with the Mariners until 2017.

Roux was selected by fan vote to play for the A-League All Stars in 2014 against Juventus. He came on as a second-half substitute for Manny Muscat in a 3–2 loss.

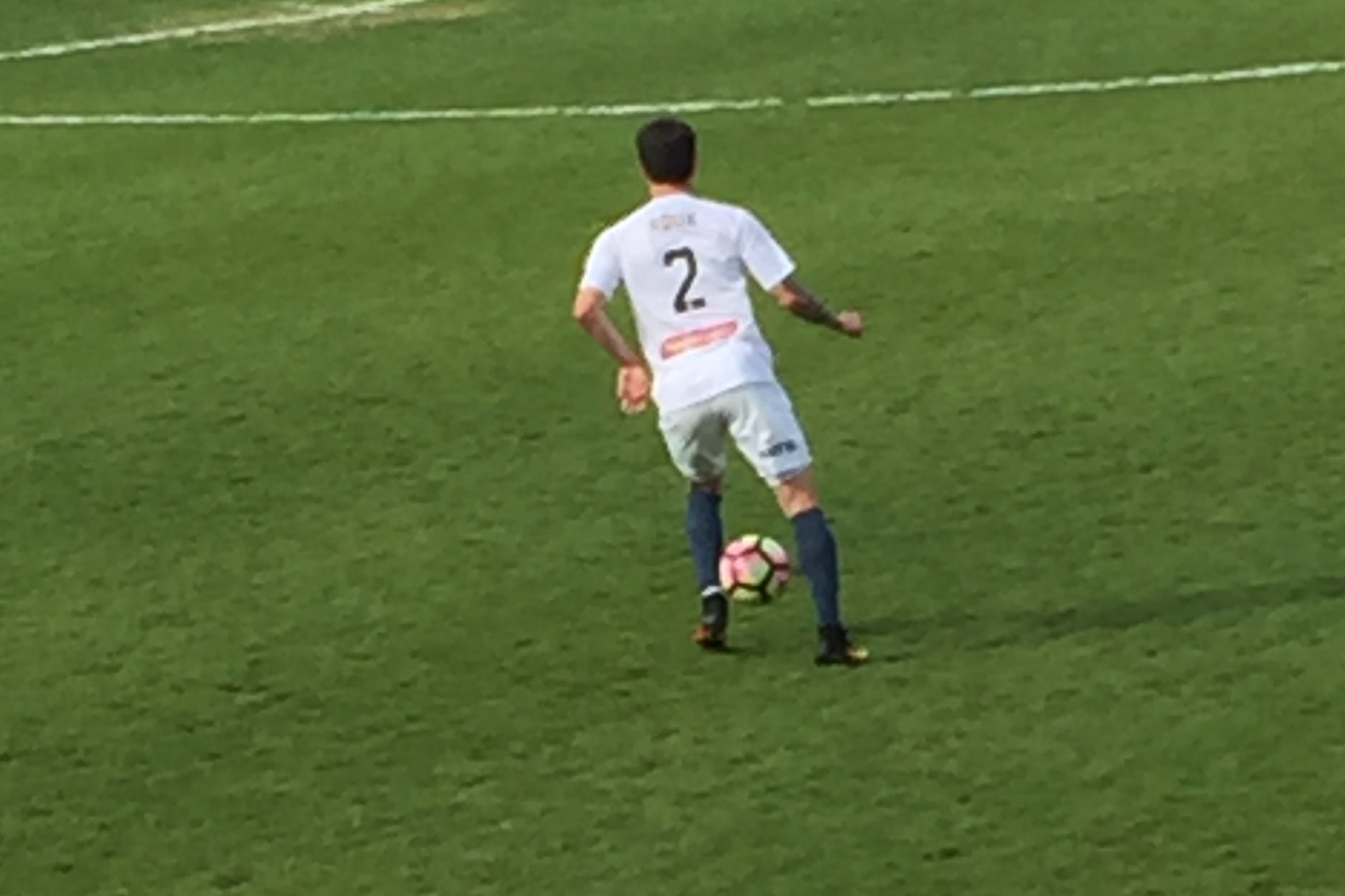
Roux playing for Central Coast Mariners in 2016

On 30 January 2016, Roux scored his second goal for the Mariners, again in a win over Wellington, playing a one-two with Luis García before chipping the 'keeper. On 21 February 2016, Roux fell awkwardly whilst attempting to block a shot in a game against Melbourne City, resulting in a broken fibula, damaged ligaments and a dislocated shoulder, ruling him out for the remainder of the season. He returned to training in June 2016 ahead of the 2016–17 season.

Roux captained the Mariners for the first time in a draw with Western Sydney Wanderers on 29 October 2016 in the absence of regular captain Nick Montgomery, and was named man of the match for his performance. In April 2017, he extended his contract with the club until mid-2019. Roux made his 100th A-League appearance in a draw with Adelaide United on 7 February 2018, and made his 100th league appearance for the Mariners one week later.

In April 2018, Mariners coach Wayne O'Sullivan refused to comment on speculation that Roux could move to Melbourne Victory. Roux was granted a release from the club on 18 April 2018 to pursue other opportunities.

Roux would later say he had felt "stale" at the Mariners following multiple unsuccessful seasons for the club and Roux's injury issues.

=== Melbourne Victory ===
Two months after his release from Central Coast Mariners, Roux signed a two-year contract with Melbourne Victory. Roux made his Victory A-League debut in October 2018, setting up a goal for Keisuke Honda in a 2–1 loss in the Melbourne Derby against Melbourne City in their opening game of the 2018–19 A-League. He scored his first goal for the Victory a week later, heading in a corner from Honda in a 3–2 loss to Perth Glory. He scored his second goal for the Victory on 15 January 2019, again from a corner, in a 5–0 win over Brisbane Roar. Roux was a regular starter at right back in his first season with the Victory.

Roux played his 150th A-League game on 25 July 2020, in the Victory's first game following postponement of the season due to the COVID-19 pandemic in Australia, scoring a header in a 2–1 loss to Western United.

In September 2020, Roux signed an extension with the Victory to the end of the 2020–21 season. He scored his fourth A-League goal for the Victory in a 5–4 win over Western Sydney Wanderers on 23 April 2021, heading in a corner in the first half.

In June 2021, the Victory announced that Roux was one of four players leaving the club at the end of the 2020–21 season.

=== Return to Central Coast Mariners ===
On 1 October 2021, Central Coast Mariners announced that Roux had returned to the club on a one-year contract. On 15 May 2022, he scored his first goal after returning to the club, in a loss to Adelaide United in the 2021–22 A-League Men Elimination Finals which ended the Mariners' season.

Roux signed a one-year contract extension with the Mariners for the 2022–23 season in June 2022. He signed a further one-year extension for the 2023–24 season in January 2023.

Roux started for the Mariners in the 2023 A-League Men Grand Final on 3 June 2023, in which the Mariners defeated Melbourne City 6–1 to win the A-League Men Championship.

On 25 November 2023, he scored the opening goal for the Mariners with a volley in an eventual 3–1 win in the F3 Derby against Newcastle Jets. In December 2023, Roux signed a further two-year extension with the Mariners, to remain at the club until the end of the 2025–26 season. On 21 January 2024, Roux was sent off for his involvement off the bench in a scuffle late in a win over Melbourne City, having been substituted off earlier in the match. Roux was subsequently suspended for three matches, which the Mariners appealed, including given this was the first red card of Roux's A-League Men career. The suspension was subsequently reduced to two matches.

Roux was one of the more experienced players in the Mariners' Championship, Premiership and AFC Cup winning 2023-24 season. Roux came on as a substitute in the second half of the 2024 AFC Cup final, and started the 2024 A-League Men Grand Final.

== International career ==
=== Youth ===
Storm was a member of the New Zealand U-20 side which won the 2013 OFC U-20 Championship, therefore qualifying for the 2013 FIFA U-20 World Cup in Turkey. Roux was selected in the squad for the U-20 World Cup and played in all three of New Zealand's matches as they were eliminated in the group stage.

Roux was called up to the under-23 side to play in the 2015 Pacific Games. New Zealand were eliminated in the semifinals after their win over Vanuatu was overturned by the OFC for fielding an ineligible player, causing the side to miss qualification for the 2016 Olympics.

=== Senior ===
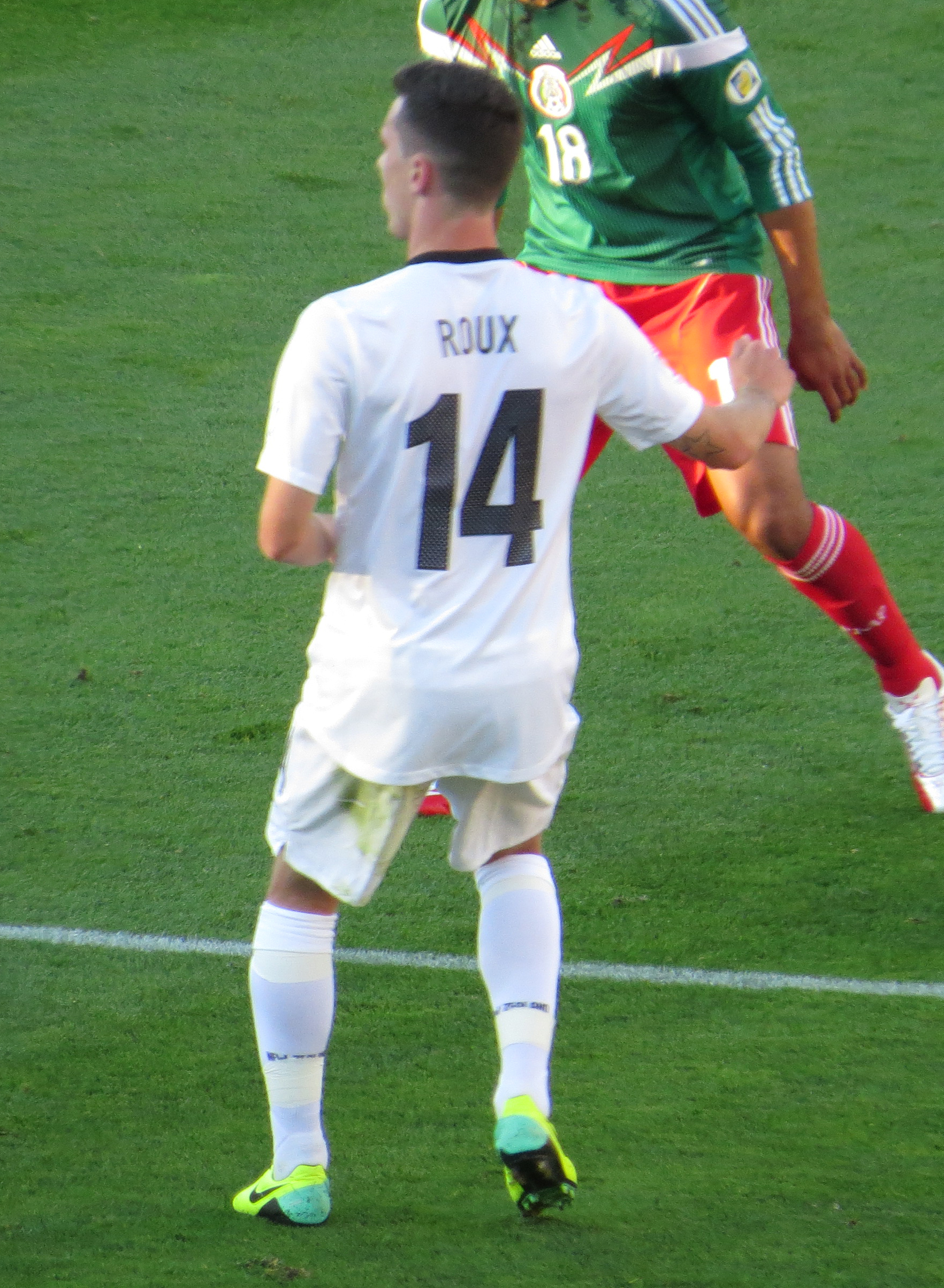
Roux playing for New Zealand in 2013

Roux was first named in the New Zealand squad for the two-legged 2014 FIFA World Cup qualification play-off against Mexico in November 2013. After not playing the first match, Roux made his debut on 20 November 2013 in the second leg in Wellington, a 4–2 loss which, following a 5–1 loss in Mexico, saw New Zealand fail to qualify for the 2014 FIFA World Cup.

Roux was omitted from the New Zealand squad in mid 2015, pending the resolution of eligibility concerns raised by New Zealand's elimination from the 2015 Pacific Games for fielding fellow South Africa-born defender Deklan Wynne. In December 2015, Roux stated that any issues had been resolved and that he was looking forward to returning to the national squad in 2016. He was absent from the squad for the 2016 OFC Nations Cup due to multiple injury issues.

Roux was recalled to the New Zealand squad in May 2017, in the lead-up to the 2017 FIFA Confederations Cup, having not played for New Zealand since 2015. He was subsequently named in the squad for the Confederations Cup tournament.

In September 2022, Roux was called up to the New Zealand squad for two friendly matches against Australia, his first national team callup since 2019.

Roux was unavailable for selection for the 2024 OFC Nations Cup for personal reasons.

== Personal life ==
Roux's first child, a son, was born in 2018.

== Career statistics ==
=== Club ===
As of 15 October 2024

Appearances and goals by club, season and competition
Club	Season	League			FFA Cup		Continental		Total	
Club	Season	Division	Apps	Goals	Apps	Goals	Apps	Goals	Apps	Goals
Perth Glory	2012–13	A-League	1	0	—		—		1	0
Central Coast Mariners	2013–14	A-League	25	1	—		6	0	31	1
Central Coast Mariners	2014–15	A-League	17	0	2	0	1	0	20	0
Central Coast Mariners	2015–16	A-League	20	1	1	0	—		21	1
Central Coast Mariners	2016–17	A-League	24	0	0	0	—		24	0
Central Coast Mariners	2017–18	A-League	19	0	1	0	—		20	0
Central Coast Mariners	Total		105	2	4	0	7	0	116	2
Melbourne Victory	2018–19	A-League	27	2	2	0	6	0	35	2
Melbourne Victory	2019–20	A-League	21	1	0	0	8	0	29	1
Melbourne Victory	2020–21	A-League	24	1	—		—		24	1
Melbourne Victory	Total		72	4	2	0	14	0	88	4
Central Coast Mariners	2021–22	A-League Men	18	1	3	0	—		21	1
Central Coast Mariners	2022–23	A-League Men	26	0	1	0	—		27	0
Central Coast Mariners	2023–24	A-League Men	25	1	1	0	12	1	38	2
Central Coast Mariners	2024–25	A-League Men	22	0	1	0	6	0	29	0
Central Coast Mariners	Total		91	2	6	0	18	1	105	3
Career Total			247	8	12	0	35	1	294	9

=== International ===
As of 22 November 2025

New Zealand national team
Year	Apps	Goals
2013	1	0
2014	5	0
2015	1	0
2016	0	0
2017	2	0
2018	0	0
2019	1	0
2020	0	0
2021	0	0
2022	1	0
2023	0	0
2024	4	0
2025	3	0
Total	18	0

== Honours ==
Central Coast Mariners

- A-League Men Championship: 2022–23, 2023–24
- A-League Men Premiership: 2023–24
- AFC Cup: 2023–24

New Zealand U20

- OFC U-20 Championship: 2013

Individual

- A-League All Star: 2014

== See also ==
- List of Central Coast Mariners FC players
- List of Melbourne Victory FC players
- List of New Zealand international footballers
- List of Perth Glory FC players
