= Brad Tapp =

Malaysian football player

Bradley Tapp
Personal information
- Full name: Bradley Anthony Tapp
- Date of birth: 16 January 2001 (age 25)
- Place of birth: Sydney, Australia
- Height: 1.83 m (6 ft 0 in)
- Position: Defensive midfielder

Team information
- Current team: Johor Darul Ta'zim
- Number: 26

Youth career
- 2018–2019: Blacktown City
- 2019–2023: Central Coast Mariners

Senior career*
Years	Team	Apps	(Gls)
2019–2023	CCM Academy	8	(0)
2022–2026	Central Coast Mariners	47	(1)
2026–	Johor Darul Ta'zim	4	(0)

International career^{‡}
2026–	Malaysia	3	(0)
Medal record
Men's football
Representing Malaysia
FIFA ASEAN Cup
Third place	2026 Indonesia	Team
- * Club domestic league appearances and goals as of 11 September 2026 ‡ National team caps and goals as of 01 October 2026

Bradley Tapp (born 16 January 2001) is a professional footballer who plays as a defensive midfielder or centre back for the Malaysian Super League side Johor Darul Ta'zim. Born in Australia, he plays for the Malaysia national team.

== Career ==
Tapp played his junior football at Baulkham Hills Kookaburras before joining the academy of National Premier Leagues NSW club Blacktown City. He was part of the Blacktown City under-18s team that won the NPL NSW under-18s competition in 2019.

=== Central Coast Mariners ===
Tapp was then signed by the Central Coast Mariners for their academy. Tapp was named captain of the Mariners NPL first grade side for the 2022 season, competing in the renamed NSW League One competition, the second tier of the National Premier Leagues NSW system. Under Tapp's captaincy, the team finished top of the table to win the premiership and was promoted to the top flight for the 2023 season. Tapp also made his first-team debut for the Central Coast Mariners in the 2022 Australia Cup, coming off the bench in a penalty shoot-out defeat to Sydney FC at Leichhardt Oval.

Tapp suffered an anterior cruciate ligament injury in the 2022 NSW League One Grand Final. The injury ruled him out of the 2023 season, in which he had been due to captain the Mariners NPL side in the top flight.

In the 2023–24 A-League season, Tapp became a full-time member of the Mariners first-team squad. Tapp made his return from his ACL injury in a 9–1 win over Filipino side Stallion Laguna in the 2023–24 AFC Cup, while making his A-League debut a few weeks later against Macarthur FC. On 29 December 2023, midway through the season, Tapp was upgraded to a full A-League contract, his first professional contract.

Tapp was part of the Mariners squad that won the Championship, the Premiership and the AFC Cup in the 2023–24 season.

At the start of the 2025–26 season, Tapp shared captaincy duties with Nathan Paull for the Mariners in the absence of Trent Sainsbury. Tapp played mostly as a centre back that season, having previously been used as a midfielder. In April 2026, the club announced that Tapp would leave at the end of the season to move overseas.

=== Johor Darul Ta'zim ===
On 3 July 2026, Tapp signed for Malaysian Super League side Johor Darul Ta'zim.

== International career ==
On 13 September 2026, FIFA cleared Tapp and his Johor Darul Ta'zim teammate Bérgson to represent Malaysia as heritage players ahead of the 2026 FIFA ASEAN Cup. Tapp qualifies for Malaysia through his mother, who was born in Penang and raised in Butterworth before later moving to Australia.

He made his international debut for the Malaysia national team against Bangladesh on 25 September 2026.

== Honours ==
=== Club ===
Central Coast Mariners

- A-League Men Championship: 2023–24
- A-League Men Premiership: 2023–24
- AFC Cup: 2023–24

Johor Darul Ta'zim

- Piala Sumbangsih: 2026

Malaysia

- FIFA ASEAN Cup third place: 2026
