= Jing Reec =

Australian soccer player (born 2003)

Personal information
- Full name: Jing Machar Reec
- Date of birth: 12 June 2003 (age 23)
- Place of birth: Cairo, Egypt
- Height: 1.88 m (6 ft 2 in)
- Position: Forward

Team information
- Current team: Macarthur FC
- Number: 27

Youth career
- Blacktown Workers
- Mt Druitt Town Rangers
- 2016–2020: Marconi Stallions
- 2021–2023: AGF

Senior career*
Years	Team	Apps	(Gls)
2020	Marconi Stallions	1	(0)
2020–2021	CCM Academy	15	(11)
2021	Central Coast Mariners	1	(0)
2021–2024	AGF	0	(0)
2023–2024	→ Central Coast Mariners (loan)	20	(3)
2024–2026	Melbourne Victory	32	(0)
2026–	Macarthur FC	0	(0)

International career^{‡}
2023–	Australia U20	3	(0)
2025–	Australia U23	6	(3)
- * Club domestic league appearances and goals as of 14 June 2025 ‡ National team caps and goals as of 20 February 2026

Jing Machar Reec (Arabic: جينغ ريس, [d͡ʒɪŋ məˈtʃɑːɹ riːs]; né Jing Lual ([luːaɾ]); born 12 June 2003) is a professional soccer player who plays as a forward for Macarthur FC. Born a South Sudanese refugee in Egypt, he represents Australia at youth level.

== Early life ==
Reec was born on 12 June 2003 in a refugee camp in Cairo, Egypt. He moved to Australia at six months old. He is of South Sudanese descent.

Reec is the eighth of 10 children, with six older brothers, with his mother raising him and all of his siblings by herself after she divorced his father.

== Club career ==
=== Central Coast Mariners ===
Having played for the Central Coast Mariners Academy, Reec made his A-League debut in the Mariners' last regular season match of the 2020-21 season against Western United at home, coming off the bench and playing 19 minutes. This would be his only appearance for the club as on 9 August 2021, Central Coast Mariners confirmed that Reec had joined Danish Superliga club AGF.

=== AGF ===
He made his debut for AGF as a substitute in a win over Frem in the 2021–22 Danish Cup on 23 September 2021.

==== Loan to Central Coast Mariners ====
Reec re-joined Central Coast Mariners on a season-long loan ahead of the 2023–24 season. Reec scored his first senior goal for the Mariners in an F3 Derby, scoring the third and final goal in a 3–1 win at home against Newcastle Jets on 25 November 2023.

Reec was part of the Mariners' Championship, Premiership and AFC Cup winning 2023-24 season. Shortly after the conclusion of the season, the Mariners confirmed Reec would return to his parent club.

=== Melbourne Victory ===
On 3 July 2024, Reec joined A-League Men club Melbourne Victory on a permanent deal, signing a three-year contract with the club.

== International career ==
Reec was selected in the Australian under-20 squad for the 2023 AFC U-20 Asian Cup.

== Honours ==
Central Coast Mariners

- A-League Men Championship: 2023-24
- A-League Men Premiership: 2023-24
- AFC Cup: 2023-24
