= Ronald Barcellos =

Brazilian footballer (born 2002)

Personal information
- Full name: Ronald Barcellos Arantes
- Date of birth: 2 March 2002 (age 24)
- Place of birth: Belford Roxo, Brazil
- Height: 1.74 m (5 ft 9 in)
- Position: Forward

Team information
- Current team: Novorizontino (loan)
- Number: 7

Youth career
- 2019–2020: Flamengo
- 2021: Fortaleza
- 2021–2022: Grêmio

Senior career*
| Years | Team | Apps | (Gls) |
| 2023 | Grêmio | 0 | (0) |
| 2023 | → Caxias (loan) | 11 | (0) |
| 2023 | → Ypiranga-RS (loan) | 0 | (0) |
| 2023–2024 | Portimonense | 0 | (0) |
| 2024 | → Central Coast Mariners (loan) | 12 | (1) |
| 2025– | Maringá | 2 | (0) |
| 2025 | → Cianorte (loan) | 7 | (0) |
| 2026 | → São José-RS (loan) | 9 | (3) |
| 2026– | → Novorizontino (loan) | 11 | (1) |
- * Club domestic league appearances and goals as of 23:22, 16 November 2026 (UTC)

Ronald Barcellos Arantes (born 2 March 2002), known as Ronald Barcellos or just Ronald, is a Brazilian professional footballer who plays as a forward for Novorizontino, on loan from Maringá.

== Career ==
=== Early career ===
Born in Belford Roxo, Rio de Janeiro, Ronald joined the youth sides of Flamengo in July 2019, after impressing in the Taça das Favelas, a tournament which intends to help people from the favelas to receive opportunities in professional football. On 26 January 2021, after featuring sparingly with the under-20s, he moved to Fortaleza on a two-year deal.

After citing homesickness, Ronald left Fortaleza, but signed for Grêmio on 10 June 2021, also for the under-20 squad.

=== Grêmio and loans ===
On 22 November 2022, after finishing his formation, Ronald was loaned to Caxias for the 2023 season. He made his senior debut with the latter on 26 January 2023, starting in a 1–1 Campeonato Gaúcho away draw against São José-RS.

Ronald was a regular starter for Caxias during the 2023 Gauchão, as they lost the finals to his parent club Grêmio. He returned to the Tricolor in April 2023, but was announced on loan at Série C side Ypiranga-RS on 6 July.

=== Portimonense ===
On 29 August 2023, after just one unused substitute appearance for Ypiranga, Grêmio announced Ronald's transfer to Portuguese Primeira Liga side Portimonense. In his first months at the club, however, he only featured for the under-23 team.

==== Loan to Central Coast Mariners ====
Barcellos signed with the Central Coast Mariners on loan on 21 January 2024. He made his debut the following week against Brisbane Roar in a 2–0 victory.

On 22 February 2024, Barcellos scored the winning goal in extra time against Macarthur FC in the 2023–24 AFC Cup Zonal Final at Campbelltown Stadium, scoring in the 120th minute. It was his first goal for the club, in his seventh appearance in all competitions. Three days later, playing in a league match against Melbourne Victory, Barcellos was substituted onto the pitch in the 95th minute, and received a red card in the 97th with his first involvement, capping off an eventful week.

Barcellos was part of the Mariners' Championship, Premiership and AFC Cup winning 2023-24 season.

== Honours ==
Central Coast Mariners

- A-League Men Championship: 2023-24
- A-League Men Premiership: 2023–24
- AFC Cup: 2023–24

Novorizontino

- Campeonato Brasileiro Série B: 2026

== Personal life ==
Ronald's mother Débora died in May 2020, amidst the COVID-19 pandemic, due to the disease.
