= List of Central Coast Mariners FC players =

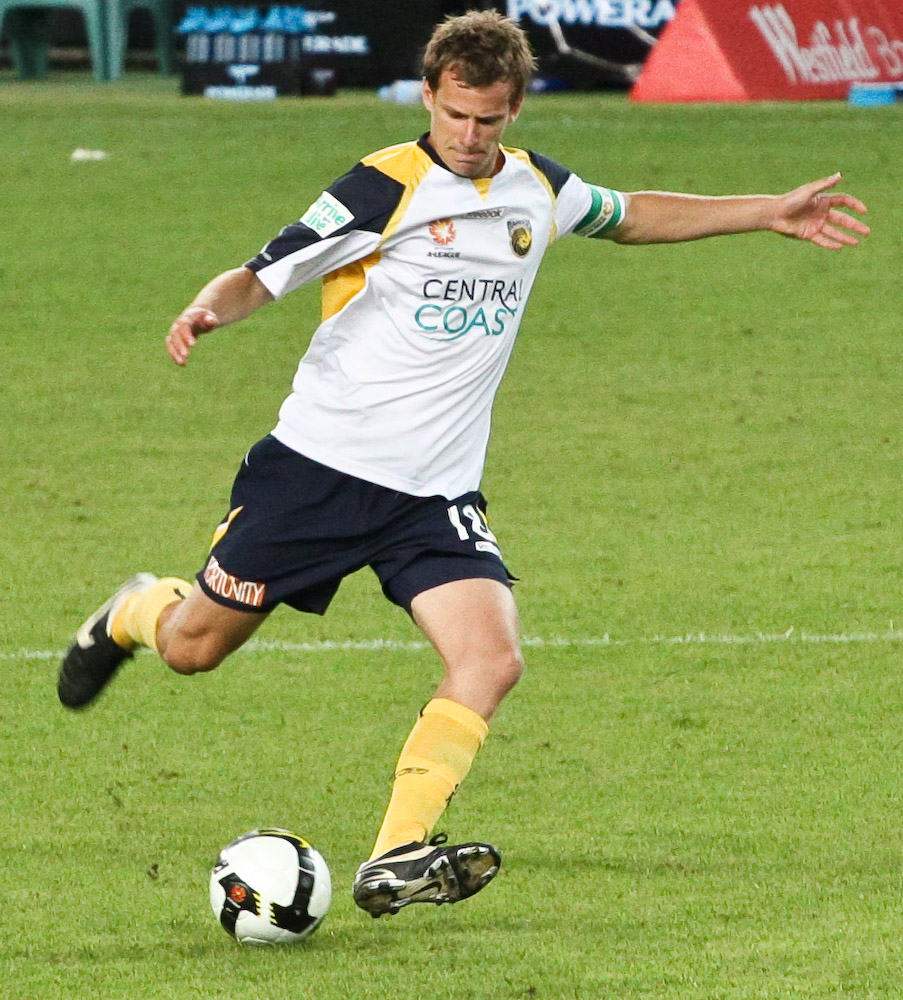
Alex Wilkinson was club captain from 2007 to 2012.

Central Coast Mariners Football Club is an Australian professional association football club based in Gosford, on the Central Coast of New South Wales. The club was formed in November 2004, and the team played their first competitive match in May 2005, when they entered the 2005 Australian Club World Championship Qualifying Tournament. The Mariners play their home matches at Central Coast Stadium. 181 players have made a competitive first-team appearance for the club; those players are listed here. Players are listed in order of their first appearance for the Mariners, and alphabetical order by surname for players who debuted simultaneously.

The Mariners' record appearance-maker is John Hutchinson, who made 271 appearances over a 10-year playing career, ahead of Matt Simon. Hutchinson also holds the record for the most starts, having started in 232 games. Simon is the club's top goalscorer with 66 goals in his eleven seasons with the club, twenty-three more than next-highest scorer Adam Kwasnik. Nineteen players have made 100 appearances or more, including six members of the 2013 A-League Grand Final winning team and three members of the 2023 A-League Men Grand Final and 2024 A-League Men Grand Final winning teams. Danny Vukovic is the only goalkeeper to have made over 100 appearances for the side. Eight players have held the position of club captain, Alex Wilkinson for the longest period (five years).

== Key ==
General

- Appearances and goals are for first-team competitive matches only, including A-League Men, AFC Champions League, AFC Cup, Australia Cup, A-League Pre-Season Challenge Cup and 2005 Australian Club World Championship Qualifying Tournament matches.
- Statistics are correct up to 18 October 2026.

Table headers

- Nationality – If a player played international football, the country/countries he played for are shown. Otherwise, the player's nationality is given as their country of birth.
- Club career – The year of the player's first appearance for Central Coast Mariners to the year of his last appearance.
- Starts – The number of games started.
- Subs – The number of games played as a substitute.
- Total – The total number of games played, both as a starter and as a substitute.
- Goals – The number of goals scored.

Positions key
GK	Goalkeeper
DF	Defender
MF	Midfielder
FW	Forward
U	Utility player

== Players ==
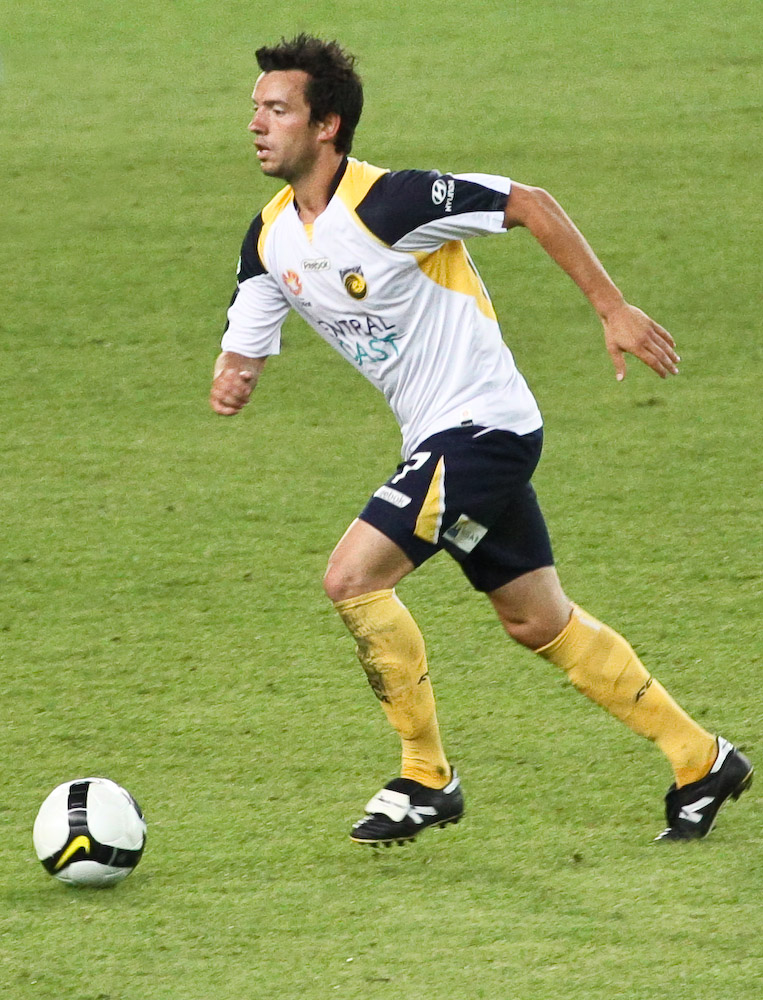
John Hutchinson made more than 250 appearances for Central Coast Mariners.

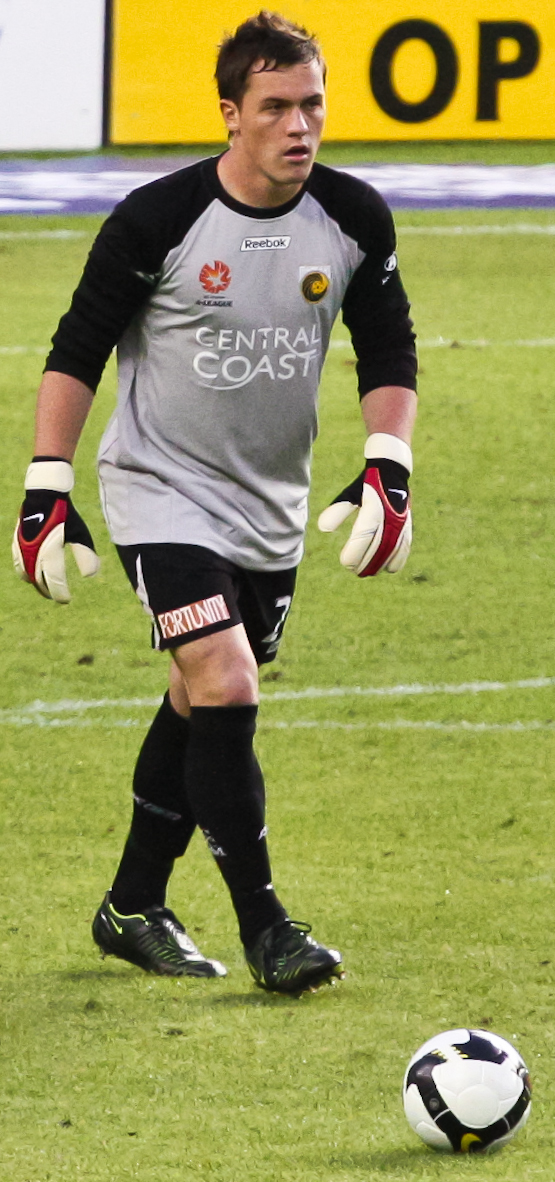
Danny Vukovic is the Mariners' most-capped goalkeeper.

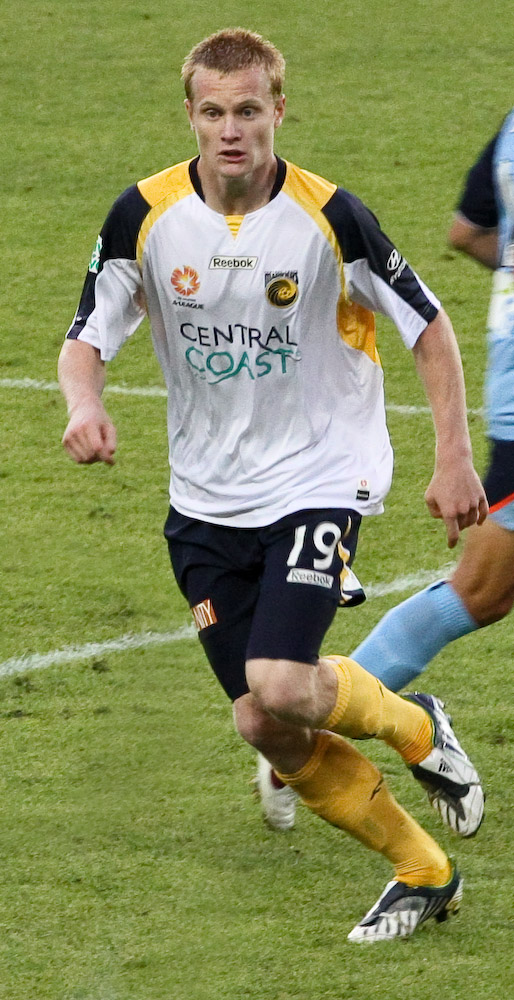
Matt Simon is the Mariners' all-time top goalscorer.

Table of players, including nationalities, positions and appearance details
Player	Nationality	Position	Club career	Starts	Subs	Total	Goals	Ref
Michael Beauchamp	Australia	DF	2005–2006	29	1	30	0	
Damien Brown	Australia	MF	2005–2007	51	7	58	3	
Andrew Clark	Australia	DF	2005–2010	79	24	103	0	
John Crawley	Australia	GK	2005	13	0	13	0	
André Gumprecht	Germany	MF	2005–2009	66	20	86	5	
Nik Mrdja	Australia	FW	2005–2010	34	33	67	20	
Wayne O'Sullivan	Ireland	MF	2005–2007	43	4	47	1	
Stewart Petrie	Scotland	U	2005–2007	50	3	53	14	
Tom Pondeljak	Australia	MF	2005–2008	51	15	66	9	
Noel Spencer	Australia	MF	2005–2007	52	3	55	7	
Alex Wilkinson	Australia	DF	2005–2012	206	0	206	3	
John Hutchinson	Malta	MF	2005–2015	232	39	271	18	
Dean Heffernan	Australia	DF	2005–2010	77	6	83	10	
Matthew Osman	Australia	MF	2005–2009	61	18	79	4	
Paul O'Grady	Australia	DF	2005–2009	25	17	42	3	
Adam Kwasnik	Australia	FW	2005–2008; 2009–2013	96	62	158	43	
Russell Woodruffe	Australia	FW	2005	0	6	6	0	
Leo Carle	Australia	MF	2005	0	8	8	0	
Danny Vukovic	Australia	GK	2005–2010; 2022–2024	192	1	193	0	
Ian Ferguson	Scotland	MF	2005	0	3	3	0	
Jamie McMaster	Australia	MF	2006–2007	19	11	30	1	
Nigel Boogaard	Australia	DF	2006–2010	63	3	66	3	
Brad Porter	Australia	MF	2006–2012	66	24	90	1	
Vuko Tomasevic	Australia	DF	2006–2007	14	3	17	0	
James Holland	Australia	MF	2006	0	3	3	0	
Oliver Bozanic	Australia	MF	2006; 2010–2013; 2020–2022	115	14	129	11	
Matthew Trott	Australia	GK	2006–2007	7	2	9	0	
Tony Vidmar	Australia	DF	2006–2008	34	4	38	0	
Matt Simon	Australia	FW	2006–2012; 2013–2015; 2018–2021	176	62	238	66	
Mile Jedinak	Australia	MF	2006–2008	50	1	51	8	
Damian Mori	Australia	FW	2006; 2007	11	0	11	6	
Sasho Petrovski	Australia	FW	2007–2009	44	7	51	16	
Greg Owens	Australia	MF	2007–2009	11	6	17	2	
Ian McAndrew	Australia	MF	2007	0	1	1	0	
John Aloisi	Australia	FW	2007–2008	15	0	15	7	
Alvin Ceccoli	Australia	DF	2008	6	0	6	0	
Adrian Caceres	Australia	U	2008–2009	23	6	29	3	
Dylan Macallister	Australia	FW	2008–2010	24	19	43	6	
David D'Apuzzo	Australia	U	2008–2009	4	8	12	0	
Pedj Bojić	Australia	DF	2008–2013	137	3	140	8	
Mark Bosnich	Australia	GK	2008	5	1	6	0	
Ahmad Elrich	Australia	MF	2008–2009	9	12	21	2	
Brady Smith	Australia	FW	2008–2010	1	2	3	0	
Andrew Redmayne	Australia	GK	2008–2009; 2025–	30	1	31	0	
Chris Tadrosse	Australia	U	2008	1	0	1	0	
Matthew Lewis	Australia	MF	2009–2011	4	11	15	1	
Shane Huke	Australia	DF	2009–2010	7	1	8	0	
Nick Rizzo	Australia	MF	2009	0	1	1	0	
Chris Doig	Scotland	DF	2009–2011	16	10	26	0	
Michael McGlinchey	New Zealand	MF	2009–2013; 2018–2020	143	20	163	15	
Nicky Travis	England	MF	2009–2010	14	6	20	3	
Matt Crowell	Wales	MF	2009–2010	9	4	13	0	
Panny Nikas	Australia	MF	2009–2010	1	2	3	0	
Mitchell Mallia	Australia	FW	2010	0	1	1	0	
Bernie Ibini-Isei	Australia	FW	2010–2013; 2014	55	41	96	21	
Nick Fitzgerald	Australia	U	2010; 2013–2015	66	19	85	9	
Daniel McBreen	Australia	FW	2010–2014	80	25	105	30	
Jess Vanstrattan	Australia	GK	2010	3	0	3	0	
Patrick Zwaanswijk	Netherlands	DF	2010–2013	97	2	99	13	
Rostyn Griffiths	Australia	MF	2010–2012	44	4	48	4	
Josh Rose	Australia	DF	2010–2016; 2017–2018	202	3	205	10	
Mathew Ryan	Australia	GK	2010–2013	94	0	94	0	
Patricio Pérez	Argentina	MF	2010–2011	15	3	18	6	
Mustafa Amini	Australia	U	2010–2012	25	20	45	4	
Trent Sainsbury	Australia	DF	2010–2014; 2024–	77	10	87	3	
Michael Baird	Australia	U	2011	2	4	6	0	
Mitchell Duke	Australia	FW	2011–2015	45	38	83	15	
Adriano Pellegrino	Australia	MF	2011–2013	10	7	17	0	
Troy Hearfield	Australia	U	2011–2012	5	30	35	2	
Justin Pasfield	Australia	GK	2011–2013	14	0	14	0	
Tom Rogic	Australia	U	2012	25	3	28	5	
Sam Gallagher	Australia	DF	2012	1	2	3	0	
John Sutton	England	FW	2012	10	0	10	1	
Trent McClenahan	Australia	U	2012	1	2	3	0	
Mile Sterjovski	Australia	U	2012–2014	41	17	58	6	
Nick Montgomery	Scotland	MF	2012–2017	125	8	133	3	
Zac Anderson	Australia	DF	2012–2015	71	12	83	1	
Hayden Morton	Australia	DF	2012–2015	7	1	8	0	
Brent Griffiths	Australia	MF	2012–2014	8	9	17	0	
Anthony Cáceres	Australia	MF	2013–2015	61	12	73	3	
Brad McDonald	Papua New Guinea	DF	2013; 2016	1	9	10	0	
Marcos Flores	Argentina	U	2013	11	1	12	3	
Storm Roux	New Zealand	DF	2013–2018; 2021–	221	38	259	6	
Marcel Seip	Netherlands	DF	2013–2014	13	3	16	1	
Liam Reddy	Australia	GK	2013–2015	63	0	63	0	
Eddy Bosnar	Australia	DF	2014–2015	35	2	37	4	
Isaka Cernak	Australia	MF	2014–2015	17	10	27	2	
Kim Seung-yong	South Korea	MF	2014	15	5	20	3	
Matt Sim	Australia	U	2014–2015	16	18	34	7	
Tom Slater	Australia	FW	2014	0	2	2	0	
Glen Trifiro	Australia	MF	2014–2015	13	22	35	5	
Malick Mané	Senegal	U	2014	4	2	6	0	
Josh Bingham	Australia	U	2014–2018	11	35	46	4	
Michael Neill	Australia	DF	2014–2017	34	15	49	1	
Richárd Vernes	Hungary	MF	2014–2015	7	3	10	1	
Anthony Kalik	Australia	MF	2014–2015	3	11	14	0	
Jacob Poscoliero	Australia	U	2014–2017; 2018	49	1	50	0	
Matthew Nash	Australia	GK	2014–2015	2	0	2	0	
Travis Major	Australia	FW	2015	1	9	10	1	
Liam Rose	Australia	MF	2015–2018	48	25	73	0	
Fábio Ferreira	Portugal	MF	2015–2017	52	6	58	15	
Harry Ascroft	Australia	DF	2015–2017	32	6	38	5	
Paul Izzo	Australia	GK	2015–2017	43	0	43	0	
Jake McGing	Australia	DF	2015–2019	78	8	86	4	
Roy O'Donovan	Ireland	FW	2015–2017	47	0	47	19	
Mitch Austin	Australia	MF	2015–2016	22	2	24	5	
Daniel Heffernan	England	FW	2015–2016	2	5	7	0	
Jake Adelson	Australia	U	2015	1	1	2	0	
Tomislav Uskok	Australia	DF	2015	4	2	6	0	
Tom Heward-Belle	Australia	GK	2015–2016	2	1	3	0	
Francesco Stella	Australia	MF	2016	3	5	8	0	
Alastair Bray	Australia	GK	2016	1	0	1	0	
Trent Buhagiar	Malta	FW	2016–2018	17	35	52	4	
Matthew Fletcher	Australia	FW	2016	2	5	7	0	
Luis García	Spain	MF	2016	7	3	10	2	
Adam Berry	Australia	MF	2016–2018	14	12	26	1	
Ivan Necevski	Australia	GK	2016–2017	7	1	8	0	
Blake Powell	Australia	FW	2016–2018	25	12	37	6	
Connor Pain	Australia	FW	2016–2019	67	9	76	10	
Mickaël Tavares	Senegal	MF	2016	7	2	9	0	
Kwabena Appiah	Australia	U	2016–2018	21	18	39	4	
Jacques Faty	Senegal	MF	2016	7	1	8	0	
Ryan Peterson	Australia	MF	2016	0	1	1	0	
Scott Galloway	Australia	DF	2016–2017	23	1	24	2	
Adam Pearce	Australia	GK	2017–2019	9	1	10	0	
Lachlan Wales	Australia	MF	2017–2018	7	4	11	0	
Alan Baró	Spain	DF	2017–2018	25	0	25	1	
Antony Golec	Australia	DF	2017–2018	32	0	32	0	
Tom Hiariej	Netherlands	MF	2017–2019	34	5	39	0	
Andrew Hoole	Australia	U	2017–2019	40	7	47	8	
Daniel De Silva	Australia	MF	2017–2021	64	4	68	8	
Asdrúbal	Spain	FW	2017–2018	10	1	11	2	
Wout Brama	Netherlands	MF	2017–2018	21	1	22	2	
Tom Glover	Australia	GK	2017	4	0	4	0	
Ben Kennedy	Australia	GK	2017–2019	45	0	45	0	
Kye Rowles	Australia	DF	2017–2022	109	3	112	2	
Jordan Murray	Australia	FW	2018–2020	28	17	45	7	
Peter Skapetis	Australia	FW	2018	2	3	5	1	
Jordan Smylie	Australia	FW	2018–2021	0	13	13	1	
Peter Kekeris	Australia	MF	2018–2019	0	7	7	0	
Josh Nisbet	Australia	MF	2018–	126	19	145	7	
Kalifa Cissé	Mali	DF	2018–2019	9	0	9	0	
Jack Clisby	Australia	DF	2018–2021	71	5	76	5	
Alec Vinci	Australia	DF	2018	0	1	1	0	
Charles M'Mombwa	Tanzania	MF	2018–2019	0	2	2	0	
Ross McCormack	Scotland	FW	2018	5	0	5	1	
Tommy Oar	Australia	MF	2018–2020	28	7	35	0	
Jacob Melling	Australia	MF	2018–2020	28	10	38	0	
Aiden O'Neill	Australia	MF	2018–2019	22	1	23	4	
Matt Millar	Australia	U	2018–2019	22	2	24	1	
Mario Shabow	Australia	MF	2018–2019	3	8	11	1	
Josh Macdonald	Australia	FW	2018	0	2	2	0	
Jonathan Aspropotamitis	Australia	DF	2019	13	0	13	0	
Jem Karacan	Turkey	MF	2019	9	1	10	1	
Sam Graham	England	DF	2019	8	0	8	0	
Stephen Mallon	Ireland	MF	2019	6	2	8	1	
Lewis Miller	Australia	DF	2019–2022	38	21	59	1	
Dylan Ruiz-Diaz	Australia	FW	2019–2020	1	7	8	2	
Giancarlo Gallifuoco	Australia	U	2019–2020	10	1	11	1	
Ziggy Gordon	Scotland	DF	2019–2020	30	0	30	0	
Samuel Silvera	Australia	FW	2019–2020; 2022–2023	28	16	44	6	
Ruon Tongyik	Australia	DF	2019–2022	37	5	42	1	
Mark Moric	Australia	MF	2019	0	1	1	0	
Mark Birighitti	Australia	GK	2019–2022	87	0	87	0	
Milan Đurić	Serbia	MF	2019–2020	21	5	26	5	
Dylan Fox	Australia	DF	2019–2020	13	1	14	1	
Kim Eun-sun	South Korea	MF	2019–2020	17	4	21	0	
Gianni Stensness	Australia	MF	2019–2021	48	2	50	1	
Abraham Majok	South Sudan	FW	2019–2020	0	4	4	1	
Jair	Brazil	FW	2019–2020	7	8	15	1	
Chris Harold	Australia	FW	2020	6	1	7	2	
Alou Kuol	Australia	MF	2020–2021; 2023–2025	59	44	103	22	
Louis Khoury	Australia	MF	2020	0	1	1	0	
Jaden Casella	Australia	MF	2020–2021	4	16	20	1	
Stefan Nigro	Australia	U	2020–2021	26	1	27	0	
Daniel Bouman	Australia	MF	2021	14	12	26	0	
Max Balard	Australia	DF	2021–2024	85	15	100	4	
Marco Ureña	Costa Rica	FW	2021–2022	43	9	52	13	
Daniel Hall	Fiji	U	2021–2024	76	15	91	4	
Michał Janota	Poland	MF	2021	5	11	16	0	
Stefan Janković	Serbia	MF	2021	0	1	1	0	
Matt Hatch	Australia	FW	2021–2022	3	20	23	6	
Jing Reec	Australia	MF	2021; 2023–2024	10	21	31	4	
Jacob Farrell	Australia	DF	2021–2024	81	11	92	7	
Béni Nkololo	France	FW	2021–2023	47	7	54	17	
Moresche	Brazil	FW	2021–2023	14	23	37	6	
Damian Tsekenis	Australia	FW	2021	2	4	6	0	
Cy Goddard	Japan	MF	2021–2022	13	13	26	1	
Harrison Steele	Australia	MF	2021–	69	62	131	5	
Yaren Sözer	Australia	GK	2021–2022	2	1	3	0	
Harry McCarthy	Australia	MF	2021	2	4	6	1	
Lawrence Caruso	Australia	GK	2021	0	1	1	0	
Nicolai Müller	Germany	MF	2021–2022	9	10	19	2	
Manyluak Aguek	South Sudan	MF	2021	0	1	1	0	
Garang Kuol	Australia	MF	2021–2022	4	18	22	7	
Noah Smith	Australia	DF	2021–2022; 2023–2024	10	9	19	2	
Cameron Windust	Australia	DF	2022–2023	5	8	13	0	
James Bayliss	Australia	MF	2022–2023	1	12	13	0	
Jason Cummings	Australia	FW	2022–2023	48	2	50	30	
Dor Jok	South Sudan	FW	2022	0	6	6	0	
Thomas Aquilina	Australia	DF	2022	8	5	13	0	
Michael Ruhs	Australia	FW	2022	4	12	16	3	
Nectarios Triantis	Greece	DF	2022–2023	22	4	26	0	
Paul Ayongo	Ghana	FW	2022	7	3	10	1	
Brad Tapp	Malaysia	MF	2022–2026	52	9	61	1	
Maksim Kasalovic	Australia	MF	2022	0	1	1	0	
Brian Kaltak	Vanuatu	DF	2022–2025	100	2	102	5	
Kelechi John	Nigeria	DF	2022	2	1	3	0	
Marco Túlio	Brazil	MF	2022–2024	44	3	47	24	
Sasha Kuzevski	Australia	MF	2022–2025	9	20	29	0	
Christian Theoharous	Australia	MF	2023–2026	41	58	99	6	
James McGarry	New Zealand	DF	2023	14	0	14	3	
Olayinka Sunmola	Australia	FW	2023	0	1	1	0	
Nicholas Duarte	Australia	FW	2023–	4	24	28	3	
Zac Zoricich	New Zealand	DF	2023	0	1	1	0	
Dylan Wenzel-Halls	Australia	FW	2023–2024	3	9	12	3	
Miguel Di Pizio	Australia	MF	2023–2026	36	29	65	8	
Mikael Doka	Brazil	MF	2023–2025	64	13	77	13	
Nathan Paull	Australia	DF	2023–2026	54	12	66	2	
Jack Warshawsky	Australia	GK	2023–2024	2	2	4	0	
Aydan Hammond	Australia	FW	2023	0	1	1	0	
Ángel Torres	Colombia	MF	2023–2024	32	1	33	15	
William Wilson	Kenya	MF	2023–2025	9	13	22	1	
Ronald Barcellos	Brazil	FW	2024	3	14	17	3	
Bailey Brandtman	Australia	FW	2024–	22	33	55	6	
Ryan Edmondson	England	FW	2024–2025	27	23	50	9	
Vitor Feijão	Brazil	FW	2024–	13	14	27	1	
Lucas Mauragis	Australia	DF	2024–	55	1	56	2	
Alfie McCalmont	Northern Ireland	MF	2024–	45	4	49	5	
Adam Pavlesic	Australia	GK	2024–	5	1	6	0	
Diesel Herrington	Australia	DF	2024–	9	14	23	0	
Sabit Ngor	Australia	FW	2024–	16	24	40	8	
Arthur De Lima	Australia	MF	2024–	11	17	28	3	
Dylan Peraic-Cullen	Australia	GK	2024–	31	0	31	0	
Haine Eames	Australia	MF	2024–	25	18	43	2	
Abdelelah Faisal	Iraq	MF	2025	10	8	18	1	
Lucas Scicluna	Malta	MF	2025	0	5	5	0	
Will Kennedy	Australia	DF	2025–2026	2	5	7	0	
James Donachie	Australia	DF	2025–2026	19	2	21	1	
Laurence Taylor	Australia	MF	2026–	0	1	1	0	
Ali Auglah	Iraq	FW	2026–	16	0	16	6	
Chris Donnell	Australia	MF	2026–	15	1	16	0	
Oliver Lavale	Australia	FW	2026–	14	2	16	4	
Nathanael Blair	Australia	MF	2026	4	9	13	3	
Jacob Nasso	Australia	MF	2026	2	6	8	0	
Kaito Taniguchi	Japan	FW	2026	4	3	7	0	
Jesse Mantell	Wales	MF	2026–	3	3	6	1	
Noah McCann	Scotland	DF	2026–	2	0	2	0	
Shumba Mutokoyi	Australia	DF	2026–	1	0	1	0	
Oliver O'Carroll	Australia	MF	2026–	1	0	1	0	
Luke Becvinovski	Australia	MF	2026–	0	2	2	0	
Callum McCaskey	Australia	DF	2026–	0	1	1	0	
Alex Bolton	Australia	FW	2026–	1	0	1	0	
Ty McKibbin	Australia	MF	2026–	0	1	1	0	
Presley Ortiz	Australia	FW	2026–	0	1	1	0	

== Club captains ==
Since 2005, nine players have held the position of club captain of the Central Coast Mariners. The first club captain was Noel Spencer, who was captain from 2005 to 2007. The longest-serving captain is Alex Wilkinson, who was captain from 2007 to 2012 after taking over from Spencer. Trent Sainsbury is the current captain of the club after Danny Vukovic retired in 2024.

Table of club captains, including nationalities, positions, dates and notes
Player	Nationality	Position	Dates	Notes	Ref
Noel Spencer	Australia	MF	2005–2007		Ref
Alex Wilkinson	Australia	DF	2007–2012	Longest-serving captain in Mariners' history	
John Hutchinson	Malta	MF	2012–2015		
Nick Montgomery	Scotland	MF	2015–2017		
Alan Baró	Spain	DF	2017–2018		
Matt Simon	Australia	FW	2018–2020		
Oliver Bozanic	Australia	MF	2020–2022		
Danny Vukovic	Australia	GK	2022–2024		
Trent Sainsbury	Australia	DF	2024–		

== See also ==
- List of Central Coast Mariners FC W-League players – players who appeared for the Mariners' women's team
