= A-League Men transfers for 2025–26 season =

Australian soccer season transfers

This is a list of Australian soccer transfers for the 2025–26 A-League Men. Only moves featuring at least one A-League Men club are listed.

Clubs were able to sign players at any time, but many transfers only officially went through on 1 July because the majority of player contracts finished on 30 June.

== Transfers ==
All players without a flag are Australian. Clubs without a flag are clubs participating in the A-League Men.

=== Pre-season ===
Date	Name	Moving from	Moving to
7 May 2025	(Poland) Patryk Klimala	Sydney FC	(Poland) Śląsk Wrocław (end of loan)
13 May 2025	(Spain) Isaías	Adelaide United	Retired
13 May 2025	(Spain) Javi López	Adelaide United	Retired
15 May 2025	Nicolas Milanovic	Western Sydney Wanderers	(Scotland) Aberdeen
4 June 2025	Mark Birighitti	(Australia) Perth SC	Perth Glory
4 June 2025	Corey Brown	Brisbane Roar	(Australia) Brisbane City
10 June 2025	Zac Sapsford	Western Sydney Wanderers	(Scotland) Dundee United
12 June 2025	Akol Akon	Western Sydney Wanderers NPL	Sydney FC
13 June 2025	Kasey Bos	Melbourne Victory	(Germany) Mainz 05
13 June 2025	Daniel Arzani	Melbourne Victory	(Hungary) Ferencváros
14 June 2025	(Morocco) Anas Ouahim	Sydney FC	Unattached
15 June 2025	(New Zealand) Dane Ingham	Newcastle Jets	(Malaysia) Sabah
15 June 2025	Dean Pelekanos	Western Sydney Wanderers	(Malaysia) Sabah
17 June 2025	(Bosnia and Herzegovina) Milorad Stajić	(Serbia) Radnički Niš	Brisbane Roar
25 June 2025	(Sri Lanka) Jack Hingert	Brisbane Roar	(Australia) Wynnum Wolves
25 June 2025	Ryan Scott	Newcastle Jets	(Australia) Preston Lions
27 June 2025	Riley Warland	Perth Glory	(Australia) Stirling Macedonia
27 June 2025	Jordan Elsey	Adelaide United	(Australia) Campbelltown City
27 June 2025	Jack Warshawsky	Central Coast Mariners	(Australia) Oakleigh Cannons
27 June 2025	Noah Smith	Central Coast Mariners	(Australia) Adelaide City
28 June 2025	Fabian Monge	Melbourne Victory	(Australia) APIA Leichhardt
28 June 2025	Yianni Nicolaou	Macarthur FC	(Australia) Sutherland Sharks
28 June 2025	Christian Siciliano	Melbourne Victory	(Australia) Caroline Springs George Cross
29 June 2025	Tass Mourdoukoutas	Perth Glory	(Australia) Marconi Stallions
30 June 2025	(England) Ryan Tunnicliffe	Adelaide United	Unattached
30 June 2025	Josh Cavallo	Adelaide United	(England) Peterborough Sports
30 June 2025	(Colombia) Neyder Moreno	Auckland FC	Unattached
30 June 2025	(New Zealand) Max Mata	Auckland FC	(England) Shrewsbury Town (end of loan)
30 June 2025	(New Zealand) Alex Paulsen	Auckland FC	(England) Bournemouth (end of loan)
30 June 2025	(New Zealand) Luis Toomey	Auckland FC	Unattached
30 June 2025	(Indonesia) Rafael Struick	Brisbane Roar	Unattached
30 June 2025	Hosine Bility	Brisbane Roar	(Portugal) Mafra (end of loan)
30 June 2025	Keegan Jelacic	Brisbane Roar	(Belgium) Gent (end of loan)
30 June 2025	Louis Zabala	Brisbane Roar	Unattached
30 June 2025	Adam Zimarino	Brisbane Roar	Unattached
30 June 2025	(Portugal) Asumah Abubakar	Brisbane Roar	Unattached
30 June 2025	(France) Florin Berenguer	Brisbane Roar	Unattached
30 June 2025	(Lebanon) Walid Shour	Brisbane Roar	Unattached
30 June 2025	Sasha Kuzevski	Central Coast Mariners	Unattached
30 June 2025	(Kenya) William Wilson	Central Coast Mariners	Unattached
30 June 2025	Daniel De Silva	Macarthur FC	Unattached
30 June 2025	Jake Hollman	Macarthur FC	Unattached
30 June 2025	Peter Makrillos	Macarthur FC	Unattached
30 June 2025	Ivan Vujica	Macarthur FC	Unattached
30 June 2025	(Ivory Coast) Kévin Boli	Macarthur FC	Unattached
30 June 2025	(Israel) Yonatan Cohen	Melbourne City	Unattached
30 June 2025	Marco Tilio	Melbourne City	(Scotland) Celtic (end of loan)
30 June 2025	Alexander Menelaou	Melbourne Victory	(Australia) South Melbourne
30 June 2025	Bruno Fornaroli	Melbourne Victory	Retired
30 June 2025	Matthew Scarcella	Newcastle Jets	Sydney FC (end of loan)
30 June 2025	(Brazil) Wellissol	Newcastle Jets	Unattached
30 June 2025	Jacob Dowse	Newcastle Jets	Retired
30 June 2025	Zac Bowling	(Australia) Blacktown City	Newcastle Jets (end of loan)
30 June 2025	Zac Bowling	Newcastle Jets	Unattached
30 June 2025	(Belgium) Anas Hamzaoui	Perth Glory	Unattached
30 June 2025	Lachlan Barr	Perth Glory	Unattached
30 June 2025	Patrick Wood	Perth Glory	Sydney FC (end of loan)
30 June 2025	(Japan) Hiroaki Aoyama	Perth Glory	Unattached
30 June 2025	(Japan) Yuto Misao	Perth Glory	Unattached
30 June 2025	(Japan) Takuya Okamoto	Perth Glory	Unattached
30 June 2025	Tomislav Mrčela	Perth Glory	Unattached
30 June 2025	Jaushua Sotirio	Sydney FC	Unattached
30 June 2025	(North Macedonia) Stefan Colakovski	Wellington Phoenix	Unattached
30 June 2025	(Portugal) Francisco Geraldes	Wellington Phoenix	(Malaysia) Johor Darul Ta'zim (end of loan)
30 June 2025	(New Zealand) Dublin Boon	Wellington Phoenix	Unattached
30 June 2025	Alexander Badolato	Melbourne Victory	Western Sydney Wanderers (end of loan)
30 June 2025	Taiga Harper	Western Sydney Wanderers	Unattached
30 June 2025	(South Korea) Jeong Tae-wook	Western Sydney Wanderers	(South Korea) Jeonbuk Hyundai Motors (end of loan)
30 June 2025	Jack Clisby	Western Sydney Wanderers	Unattached
30 June 2025	James Temelkovski	Western Sydney Wanderers	(Hong Kong) Tai Po
30 June 2025	Kane Vidmar	Western United	Unattached
30 June 2025	(Japan) Riku Danzaki	Western United	Unattached
30 June 2025	(Lebanon) Ramy Najjarine	Western United	Unattached
1 July 2025	Craig Goodwin	(Saudi Arabia) Al-Wehda	Adelaide United
1 July 2025	(Netherlands) Julian Kwaaitaal	(Netherlands) FC Eindhoven	Adelaide United (end of loan)
1 July 2025	Noah Botic	Western United	Austria Wien
1 July 2025	Hosine Bility	(Portugal) Mafra	Brisbane Roar
1 July 2025	(New Zealand) James McGarry	(Scotland) Aberdeen	Brisbane Roar
1 July 2025	Michael Ruhs	Western United	Brisbane Roar
1 July 2025	(Tanzania) Charles M'Mombwa	Newcastle Jets	(Malta) Floriana
1 July 2025	(Sweden) Marcus Antonsson	Western Sydney Wanderers	(Sweden) IFK Värnamo
1 July 2025	Anthony Caceres	Sydney FC	Macarthur FC
1 July 2025	Harry Politidis	Melbourne City	Macarthur FC
1 July 2025	Callum Talbot	Melbourne City	Macarthur FC
1 July 2025	Ryan Teague	Melbourne Victory	(Belgium) Mechelen
1 July 2025	Louis D'Arrigo	(Poland) Lechia Gdańsk	Melbourne Victory
1 July 2025	Keegan Jelacic	(Belgium) Gent	Melbourne Victory
1 July 2025	Alexander Badolato	Western Sydney Wanderers	Newcastle Jets
1 July 2025	Max Burgess	Sydney FC	Newcastle Jets
1 July 2025	(South Sudan) Joel Anasmo	(South Korea) Jeonbuk Hyundai Motors	Perth Glory (end of loan)
1 July 2025	(Vanuatu) Brian Kaltak	Central Coast Mariners	Perth Glory
1 July 2025	Arion Sulemani	Melbourne City	Perth Glory
1 July 2025	(New Zealand) Sam Sutton	Wellington Phoenix	Perth Glory
1 July 2025	(England) Callum Timmins	Newcastle Jets	Perth Glory
1 July 2025	(England) Scott Wootton	Wellington Phoenix	Perth Glory
1 July 2025	Adrian Segecic	Sydney FC	(England) Portsmouth
1 July 2025	Kealey Adamson	Macarthur FC	(England) Queens Park Rangers
1 July 2025	Jaylan Pearman	Perth Glory	(England) Queens Park Rangers
1 July 2025	(Tunisia) Saîf-Eddine Khaoui	Macarthur FC	(France) Red Star
1 July 2025	Rhys Youlley	(Belgium) Westerlo	Sydney FC
1 July 2025	(New Zealand) Kosta Barbarouses	Wellington Phoenix	Western Sydney Wanderers
1 July 2025	Steven Ugarkovic	Melbourne City	Western Sydney Wanderers
1 July 2025	Phillip Cancar	Newcastle Jets	Western Sydney Wanderers
1 July 2025	Alou Kuol	Central Coast Mariners	Western Sydney Wanderers
1 July 2025	Marcus Younis	(Netherlands) Jong PSV	Western Sydney Wanderers (end of loan)
2 July 2025	(Brazil) Mikael Doka	Central Coast Mariners	(Japan) Ventforet Kofu (loan)
3 July 2025	Franco Lino	(Norway) Viking	Melbourne Victory (loan)
3 July 2025	James Jeggo	Melbourne City	Retired
4 July 2025	(Croatia) Marin Jakoliš	Macarthur FC	(Armenia) Noah
4 July 2025	James Donachie	Western United	(Australia) Sydney Olympic
6 July 2025	Matt Acton	Brisbane Roar	(Australia) Lions FC
7 July 2025	Dean Bouzanis	(England) Charlton Athletic	Brisbane Roar
7 July 2025	(New Zealand) Scott Morris	(England) Stoke City	Auckland FC
8 July 2025	Jaiden Kucharski	Sydney FC	Western United
9 July 2025	(Republic of Ireland) Joe Shaughnessy	(Scotland) Dundee	Newcastle Jets
10 July 2025	Mitchell Langerak	Melbourne Victory	Retired
11 July 2025	Liam Bonetig	(Scotland) Celtic B	Melbourne City
13 July 2025	Ben Mewett	Central Coast Mariners Academy	Western Sydney Wanderers
15 July 2025	(Nigeria) Ifeanyi Eze	(Iraq) Al-Karkh	Wellington Phoenix
16 July 2025	(England) Zach Clough	Adelaide United	(Malaysia) Selangor
16 July 2025	(Croatia) Šime Gržan	Unattached	Macarthur FC
16 July 2025	James Delianov	Adelaide United	Newcastle Jets
17 July 2025	(New Zealand) Tommy Smith	Auckland FC	(England) Braintree Town
21 July 2025	Scott Galloway	Auckland FC	Unattached
22 July 2025	Carlo Armiento	Unattached	Wellington Phoenix
24 July 2025	Al Hassan Toure	(United States) FC Tulsa	Sydney FC
24 July 2025	(England) Chris Long	Unattached	Brisbane Roar
25 July 2025	Paul Okon-Engstler	(Portugal) Benfica B	Sydney FC
28 July 2025	Justin Vidic	Newcastle Jets	Brisbane Roar
31 July 2025	Stefan Mauk	Adelaide United	(Vietnam) Cong An Hanoi (loan)
5 August 2025	(South Korea) Ji Dong-won	(South Korea) Suwon FC	Macarthur FC
5 August 2025	(Japan) Takeshi Kanamori	(Japan) Avispa Fukuoka	Melbourne City
7 August 2025	Lachlan Brook	(United States) Real Salt Lake	Auckland FC
8 August 2025	Joel Bertolissio	(Australia) APIA Leichhardt	Newcastle Jets
8 August 2025	(France) Zinédine Machach	Melbourne Victory	Unattached
8 August 2025	(Brazil) Vitor Feijão	Central Coast Mariners	(Azerbaijan) Kapaz
11 August 2025	Sebastian Esposito	(Italy) Lecce	Melbourne Victory (loan)
11 August 2025	Ruon Tongyik	Unattached	Western Sydney Wanderers
12 August 2025	Dimitri Valkanis	(Greece) AEK Athens	Brisbane Roar (loan)
13 August 2025	Jason Davidson	(Greece) Panserraikos	Melbourne Victory
13 August 2025	Nikola Mileusnic	Perth Glory	Wellington Phoenix
13 August 2025	(Greece) Georgios Vrakas	(Greece) Atromitos	Brisbane Roar
13 August 2025	Archie Goodwin	Adelaide United	(United States) Charlotte FC
15 August 2025	Andrew Redmayne	Sydney FC	Central Coast Mariners
18 August 2025	(Netherlands) Joshua Smits	Unattached	Adelaide United
18 August 2025	(Democratic Republic of the Congo) Marcel Tisserand	Unattached	Sydney FC
18 August 2025	(New Zealand) Oliver Sail	Perth Glory	Auckland FC
19 August 2025	(England) Sam Cosgrove	Unattached	Auckland FC
19 August 2025	(France) Damien Da Silva	(France) Clermont Foot 63	Macarthur FC
21 August 2025	(Canada) Manjrekar James	Unattached	Wellington Phoenix
21 August 2025	Jaiden Kucharski	Western United	Perth Glory
22 August 2025	Marcus Younis	Western Sydney Wanderers	(Denmark) Brøndby
26 August 2025	Oscar Priestman	Western Sydney Wanderers	(Scotland) Motherwell
29 August 2025	Gabriel Popovic	Unattached	Perth Glory
30 August 2025	Emre Sağlam	(Turkey) Gençlerbirliği	Melbourne Victory (loan)
30 August 2025	Oliver Dragicevic	(Australia) St Albans Dinamo	Melbourne Victory
30 August 2025	Xavier Stella	Melbourne City FC NPL	Melbourne Victory
2 September 2025	(New Zealand) Scott Morris	Auckland FC	Retired
2 September 2025	(Brazil) Léo Sena	Sydney FC	Unattached
3 September 2025	(Peru) Piero Quispe	(Mexico) UNAM	Sydney FC (loan)
3 September 2025	Matthew Scarcella	Sydney FC	(Norway) Hødd
5 September 2025	(Brazil) Anselmo	Unattached	Adelaide United
5 September 2025	James Donachie	(Australia) Sydney Olympic	Central Coast Mariners
8 September 2025	Denis Genreau	(Spain) Deportivo La Coruña	Melbourne Victory
9 September 2025	Jack Warshawsky	(Australia) Oakleigh Cannons	Melbourne Victory
12 September 2025	Aaron Gurd	Sydney FC	(Thailand) Kanchanaburi Power (loan)
12 September 2025	(Mexico) Rafael Durán Martinez	(Mexico) Atlante	Macarthur FC
12 September 2025	(Kosovo) Elbasan Rashani	Unattached	Melbourne City
12 September 2025	Jake Girdwood-Reich	(United States) St. Louis City	Auckland FC (loan)
15 September 2025	(New Zealand) Dan Edwards	(Australia) Avondale FC	Wellington Phoenix
15 September 2025	Pearson Kasawaya	Brisbane Roar	Unattached
15 September 2025	(Spain) Juan Muñiz	Unattached	Adelaide United
15 September 2025	(Spain) Víctor Campuzano	Unattached	Sydney FC
16 September 2025	(Lebanon) Ramy Najjarine	Unattached	Wellington Phoenix
16 September 2025	(Costa Rica) Youstin Salas	(Costa Rica) Sporting San José	Brisbane Roar (loan)
16 September 2025	(Spain) Juan Mata	Western Sydney Wanderers	Melbourne Victory
17 September 2025	Will Kennedy	Sydney FC	Central Coast Mariners
17 September 2025	(Brazil) Douglas Costa	Sydney FC	Unattached
18 September 2025	Alexi Houridis	Melbourne Victory NPL	Central Coast Mariners
18 September 2025	James Houridis	Melbourne Victory NPL	Central Coast Mariners
19 September 2025	Matthew Dench	(Australia) Oakleigh Cannons	Brisbane Roar
19 September 2025	Richard Nkomo	Western Sydney Wanderers NPL	Newcastle Jets
23 September 2025	Israel Monga	(Australia) Goulburn Valley Suns	Adelaide United
29 September 2025	Sabit Ngor	(Australia) Heidelberg United	Central Coast Mariners (end of loan)
10 October 2025	(Wales) Tom Lawrence	Unattached	Perth Glory
30 October 2025	Riley Foxe	Unattached	Perth Glory
5 November 2025	David Williams	Perth Glory	Unattached

==== Western United hibernation process ====
On 6 September 2025, Western United were put into hibernation for the 2025–26 season and all the players were released by the club to allow them to seek alternative employment.

Listed below are the players who were at the club at time of the hibernation announcement and the clubs they joined if signed in the current transfer window.

Name	New club
Rhys Bozinovski	Perth Glory
(New Zealand) Luka Coveny	Unattached
Ben Garuccio	Sydney FC
Matthew Grimaldi	Melbourne Victory
(Japan) Hiroshi Ibusuki	(India) East Bengal
(Japan) Tomoki Imai	(Japan) Machida Zelvia
(Lebanon) Khoder Kaddour	(Australia) South Melbourne
Besian Kutleshi	Melbourne City
Jordan Lauton	Brisbane Roar
Oliver Lavale	(Australia) South Melbourne
Dylan Leonard	(Germany) Schalke 04
Jake Najdovski	Adelaide United
Alex Nassiep	Newcastle Jets
Sebastian Pasquali	(Australia) South Melbourne
Tate Russell	(Australia) Wollongong Wolves
(Iraq) Charbel Shamoon	Perth Glory
Matt Sutton	Perth Glory
Angus Thurgate	Western Sydney Wanderers
Luke Vickery	Macarthur FC
Michael Vonja	Unattached
Abel Walatee	Sydney FC
James York	Unattached

=== Mid-season ===
Date	Name	Moving from	Moving to
22 December 2025	Aleksandar Šušnjar	Newcastle Jets	(Uzbekistan) Lokomotiv Tashkent
31 December 2025	Luka Kolić	Melbourne Victory	(Australia) Melbourne Knights
31 December 2025	(Brazil) Mikael Doka	(Japan) Ventforet Kofu	Central Coast Mariners (end of loan)
1 January 2026	(Brazil) Mikael Doka	Central Coast Mariners	(Brazil) Operário Ferroviário
4 January 2026	Lucas Herrington	Brisbane Roar	(United States) Colorado Rapids
4 January 2026	(Iraq) Mohamed Al-Taay	Western Sydney Wanderers	(Iraq) Al-Karma
4 January 2026	Khoa Ngo	Perth Glory	(Vietnam) Cong An Ho Chi Minh City (loan)
5 January 2026	(Iraq) Abdelelah Faisal	Central Coast Mariners	(Iraq) Al-Karma
6 January 2026	Anthony Didulica	Unattached	Perth Glory
8 January 2026	Alex Bonetig	Western Sydney Wanderers	(United States) Portland Timbers
12 January 2026	Gabriel Cleur	Western Sydney Wanderers	Retired
14 January 2026	Mitchell Duke	(Japan) Machida Zelvia	Macarthur FC
14 January 2026	(South Sudan) Ajak Riak	(Uzbekistan) AGMK	Adelaide United
14 January 2026	Marcus Ferkranus	Brisbane Roar	(Australia) Avondale FC
14 January 2026	Ali Auglah	(Australia) Sydney Olympic	Central Coast Mariners
14 January 2026	Oliver Lavale	(Australia) South Melbourne	Central Coast Mariners
14 January 2026	Ryan Teague	(Belgium) Mechelen	Melbourne City (loan)
14 January 2026	(Japan) Charles Nduka	(Japan) Kagoshima United	Melbourne Victory
14 January 2026	(England) Zach Clough	(Malaysia) Selangor	Newcastle Jets
14 January 2026	(New Zealand) Bill Tuiloma	Unattached	Wellington Phoenix
16 January 2026	(Norway) Sander Kartum	(Scotland) Heart of Midlothian	Wellington Phoenix (loan)
16 January 2026	(Japan) Hideki Ishige	Wellington Phoenix	Unattached
16 January 2026	Chris Donnell	(Australia) Sydney Olympic	Central Coast Mariners
16 January 2026	(Japan) Hiroshi Ibusuki	(India) East Bengal	Western Sydney Wanderers
17 January 2026	Nicholas D'Agostino	(Norway) Viking	Brisbane Roar (loan)
19 January 2026	Mitchell Glasson	(Finland) KTP	Sydney FC (end of loan)
21 January 2026	Nathanael Blair	Perth Glory	Central Coast Mariners
21 January 2026	Daniel Arzani	(Hungary) Ferencváros	Melbourne City (loan)
21 January 2026	(North Macedonia) Stefan Colakovski	Unattached	Perth Glory
22 January 2026	Adam Pavlesic	Central Coast Mariners	(Australia) Sydney United 58
22 January 2026	Alexi Houridis	Central Coast Mariners	Unattached
22 January 2026	James Houridis	Central Coast Mariners	Unattached
23 January 2026	(Scotland) Ryan Fraser	(England) Southampton	Western Sydney Wanderers
23 January 2026	Marcus Younis	(Denmark) Brøndby	Melbourne City (loan)
23 January 2026	Harrison Delbridge	Unattached	Melbourne City
27 January 2026	(England) Ryan Edmondson	Central Coast Mariners	(Republic of Ireland) St Patrick's Athletic
28 January 2026	Kai Trewin	Melbourne City	(United States) New York City
28 January 2026	(Netherlands) Julian Kwaaitaal	Adelaide United	Unattached
29 January 2026	Michael Pratezina	(Australia) Sydney United 58	Macarthur FC
29 January 2026	Adam Bugarija	Perth Glory	(Australia) Marconi Stallions (loan)
30 January 2026	(Japan) Kaito Taniguchi	(Japan) Albirex Niigata	Central Coast Mariners
30 January 2026	(New Zealand) Seth Clark	(Australia) Sydney Olympic	Central Coast Mariners
2 February 2026	Dakota Ochsenham	Melbourne City	Unattached
3 February 2026	Rhys Bozinovski	Perth Glory	(Netherlands) Heracles Almelo
6 February 2026	James Hilton	(Australia) Marconi Stallions	Auckland FC
6 February 2026	(New Zealand) Sarpreet Singh	(Serbia) TSC	Wellington Phoenix (loan)
7 February 2026	Jacob Farrell	(England) Portsmouth	Western Sydney Wanderers (loan)
10 February 2026	Luca Tevere	(Australia) Preston Lions	Perth Glory
10 February 2026	Apostolos Stamatelopoulos	(Scotland) Motherwell	Sydney FC (loan)
10 February 2026	(Norway) Marius Lode	(Sweden) BK Häcken	Brisbane Roar (loan)
11 February 2026	(Germany) Ahmet Arslan	(Germany) Rot-Weiss Essen	Sydney FC
10 February 2026	Nicholas Duarte	Central Coast Mariners	(Australia) Heidelberg United (loan)
10 February 2026	Kaelan Majekodunmi	Perth Glory	(Australia) Dandenong Thunder (loan)
13 February 2026	(England) Luke Amos	Perth Glory	(South Korea) Paju Frontier
15 February 2026	Taras Gomulka	Perth Glory	(Canada) Pacific FC

Player was released to free agency before joining new club
