= 2024–25 Central Coast Mariners FC season =

Central Coast Mariners
2024–25 season
- Chairman: Richard Peil
- Head Coach: Mark Jackson
- Stadium: Industree Group Stadium
- A-League Men: 10th
- A-League Men Finals: DNQ
- 2024 Australia Cup: Round of 32
- AFC Champions League Elite: League stage
- 2025 Australia Cup preliminary rounds: Play-off
- Top goalscorer: League: Alou Kuol (4); All: Mikael Doka; Alou Kuol (6)
- Highest home attendance: 11,542 vs. Melbourne City (31 December 2024); A-League Men
- Lowest home attendance: 1,864 vs. Yokohama F. Marinos (3 December 2024); AFC Champions League Elite
- Average home league attendance: 6,392
- Biggest win: 1–3 vs. Brisbane Roar (A) (3 January 2025); A-League Men; 1–3 vs. Western Sydney Wanderers (A) (17 January 2025); A-League Men; 3–1 vs. Perth Glory (H) (30 March 2025); A-League Men
- Biggest defeat: 6–0; Newcastle Jets (A) (12 April 2025); A-League Men
Home colours	Away colours	Third colours
- All statistics correct as of 2 May 2025.

The 2024–25 season was Central Coast Mariners Football Club's 20th season in the A-League Men. In addition to the domestic league, Central Coast Mariners also participated in this season's editions of the Australia Cup and is participating in the AFC Champions League Elite, returning to the premier Asian competition since 2015; an eight-year absence.

== Players ==
Note: Flags indicate national team as defined under FIFA eligibility rules; some limited exceptions apply. Players may hold more than one non-FIFA nationality.

No.	Pos.	Nation	Player
1	GK	AUS	Adam Pavlesic
3	DF	VAN	Brian Kaltak
4	DF	AUS	Trent Sainsbury (captain)
5	DF	AUS	Noah Smith
7	FW	AUS	Christian Theoharous
8	MF	NIR	Alfie McCalmont
9	FW	AUS	Alou Kuol
10	MF	BRA	Mikael Doka
11	FW	BRA	Vitor Feijão
12	DF	AUS	Lucas Mauragis
15	DF	NZL	Storm Roux
16	MF	AUS	Harry Steele
21	FW	AUS	Abdelelah Faisal
23	FW	AUS	Miguel Di Pizio
24	DF	AUS	Diesel Herrington

No.	Pos.	Nation	Player
26	MF	MAS	Brad Tapp
27	DF	AUS	Sasha Kuzevski
28	MF	KEN	Will Wilson
29	FW	AUS	Nicholas Duarte (scholarship)
30	GK	AUS	Jack Warshawsky
33	DF	AUS	Nathan Paull
35	FW	AUS	Arthur de Lima (scholarship)
36	MF	AUS	Haine Eames (scholarship)
37	FW	AUS	Bailey Brandtman (scholarship)
39	FW	AUS	Logan Sambrook (scholarship)
40	GK	AUS	Dylan Peraić-Cullen
44	MF	MLT	Lucas Scicluna
50	GK	AUS	Jai Ajanovic (scholarship)
99	FW	ENG	Ryan Edmondson

== Transfers and contracts ==
=== Transfers in ===
No.	Position	Player	Transferred from	Type/fee	Contract length	Date	Ref
12	DF	Lucas Mauragis	Unattached	Free transfer	3 years	5 June 2024	
8	MF	(Northern Ireland) Alfie McCalmont	(England) Carlisle United	Free transfer	2 years	12 July 2024	
1	GK	Adam Pavlesic	Unattached	Free transfer	2 years	17 July 2024	
24	DF	Diesel Herrington	(Denmark) AGF	Free transfer	2 years	18 July 2024	
11	FW	(Brazil) Vitor Feijão	Unattached	Free transfer	2 years	1 August 2024	
4	DF	Trent Sainsbury	Unattached	Free transfer	3 years	23 August 2024	
17	FW	Sabit Ngor	(Australia) Heidelberg United	Free transfer	2 years	12 September 2024	
39	FW	Logan Sambrook	(Australia) North Coast Football	Free transfer	1.5 years (scholarship)	2 January 2025	
21	FW	Abdelelah Faisal	Perth Glory	Free transfer	1.5 years	21 January 2025	

==== From academy squad ====
N	Pos.	Nat.	Name	Age	Notes
36	MF	(Australia)	Haine Eames	16	3 year scholarship contract
35	FW	(Australia)	Arthur De Lima	17	3 year scholarship contract
50	GK	(Australia)	Jai Ajanovic	16	3 year scholarship contract

=== Transfers out ===
No.	Position	Player	Transferred to	Type/fee	Date	Ref
11	FW	(Colombia) Ángel Torres	Unattached	End of contract	7 April 2024	
20	GK	Danny Vukovic	Retired		26 May 2024	
22	FW	(Brazil) Ronald Barcellos	(Portugal) Portimonense	End of loan	31 May 2024	
17	FW	Jing Reec	(Denmark) AGF	End of loan	4 June 2024	
23	DF	(Fiji) Dan Hall	Auckland FC	End of contract	28 June 2024	
29	MF	Maksim Kasalovic	(Australia) APIA Leichhardt	End of contract	29 June 2024	
6	MF	Max Balard	(Netherlands) NAC Breda	Mutual contract termination	2 July 2024	
4	MF	Josh Nisbet	(Scotland) Ross County	End of contract	9 July 2024	
18	DF	Jacob Farrell	(England) Portsmouth	Undisclosed	26 July 2024	
23	FW	Dylan Wenzel-Halls	(Malaysia) Penang	Mutual contract termination	28 August 2024	
17	FW	Sabit Ngor	(Australia) Heidelberg United	Loan	5 February 2025	

=== Contract extensions ===
No.	Player	Position	Duration	Date	Notes	Ref.
2	(Brazil) Mikael Doka	Right-back	3 years	3 June 2024	New 3-year contract, replacing previous contract which was until end of 2024–25	
16	Harry Steele	Defensive midfielder	3 years	8 July 2024	New 3-year contract, replacing previous contract which was until end of 2024–25	
27	Sasha Kuzevski	Right-back	1 year	10 July 2024	Upgraded to full contract	
39	Miguel Di Pizio	Attacking midfielder	2 years	16 July 2024	Upgraded to full contract	
40	Dylan Peraić-Cullen	Goalkeeper	3 years	17 November 2024	Upgraded to full contract until end of 2026–27	

== Pre-season and friendlies ==
21 August 2024	Central Coast Mariners (Australia)	2–2	(New Zealand) Auckland FC	Gosford, Australia
13:00 AEST	Di Pizio; Doka	Report	Rogerson 44'; Gillion 83'	Stadium: Industree Group Stadium; Attendance: 0 (behind closed doors)

6 September 2024	Central Coast Mariners (Australia)	2–0	(Australia) Sydney FC	Tuggerah, Australia
	Doka 24' (pen.); Edmondson 34'	Report		Stadium: Central Coast Regional Sports Complex; Attendance: 0 (behind closed doors)

25 September 2024	Sydney FC (Australia)	6–3	(Australia) Central Coast Mariners	Sydney, Australia
	Klimala 23', 40', 65'; Hollman 48'; Costa 59'; Segecic 69'	Report	Kuol 43'; De Lima 49'; Wilson 78'	Stadium: Sky Park

6 October 2024	Central Coast Mariners (Australia)	1–0	(New Zealand) Wellington Phoenix	Gosford, Australia
	Eames	Report		Attendance: 0 (behind closed doors)

11 October 2024	Western Sydney Wanderers (Australia)	5–1	(Australia) Central Coast Mariners	Sydney, Australia
		Report		Attendance: 0 (behind closed doors)

== Competitions ==
=== Overall record ===
Competition	First match	Last match	Starting round	Final position	Record							
Competition	First match	Last match	Starting round	Final position	Pld	W	D	L	GF	GA	GD	Win %
A-League Men	18 October 2024	2 May 2025	Matchday 1	10th	26	5	11	10	29	51	−22	19.23
2024 Australia Cup	7 August 2024		Round of 32	Round of 32	1	0	0	1	1	3	−2	0.00
AFC Champions League Elite	17 September 2024	18 February 2025	League stage	11th	7	0	1	6	9	19	−10	0.00
2025 Australia Cup play-off	14 May 2025		Play-offs	Play-offs	1	0	0	1	2	3	−1	0.00
Total					35	5	12	18	41	76	−35	14.29

Last updated: 13 May 2025
Source: Soccerway

=== A-League Men ===
==== League table ====
Pos	Team	Pld	W	D	L	GF	GA	GD	Pts	Qualification
8	Macarthur FC	26	9	6	11	50	45	+5	33	Qualification for AFC Champions League Two (Note: Qualified for AFC Champions League Two as the 2024 Australia Cup winners.)
9	Newcastle Jets	26	8	6	12	43	44	−1	30	
10	Central Coast Mariners	26	5	11	10	29	51	−22	26	Qualification for 2025 Australia Cup play-offs
11	Wellington Phoenix (Note: Auckland FC and Wellington Phoenix cannot qualify for Asian Football Confederation competitions as they are based in New Zealand, which is part of the Oceania Football Confederation.)	26	6	6	14	27	43	−16	24	Qualification for 2025 Australia Cup play-offs
12	Brisbane Roar	26	5	6	15	32	51	−19	21	Qualification for 2025 Australia Cup play-offs

Source: A-Leagues
Rules for classification: 1) points; 2) goal difference; 3) goals scored; 4) wins; 5) head-to-head results; 5a) head-to-head points; 5b) head-to-head goal difference; 6) Fair Play points; 7) away goal difference; 8) away goals per match; 9) home goal difference; 10) home goals per match; 11) toss of a coin in an event of a tie of two clubs.

==== Results summary ====
Overall								Home						Away					
Pld	W	D	L	GF	GA	GD	Pts	W	D	L	GF	GA	GD	W	D	L	GF	GA	GD
26	5	11	10	31	53	−22	26	2	5	6	15	29	−14	3	6	4	16	24	−8

Last updated: 2 May 2025.
Source: Ultimate A-League
Away figures include Central Coast Mariners' 2–1 win on neutral ground in Unite Round against Newcastle Jets on 22 November 2024.

==== Results by round ====
Round	1	2	3	4	5	6	7	8	9	10	11	12	13	15	16	14	17	18	19	20	21	22	23	24	25	26	27	28	29
Ground	H	A	H	H	N	B	H	H	A	H	H	A	A	A	A	A	H	A	B	H	H	A	A	H	A	A	H	B	H
Result	D	D	D	L	W	X	W	L	D	L	D	W	L	W	D	D	D	D	X	L	L	L	D	W	L	L	D	X	L
Position	7	9	9	10	8	9	7	9	10	10	10	9	9	10	10	8	9	9	9	10	10	10	10	10	10	10	10	10	10
Points	1	2	3	3	6	6	9	9	10	10	11	14	14	17	18	19	20	21	21	21	21	21	22	25	25	25	26	26	26

Updated to match(es) played on 2 May 2025. Source: Ultimate A-League
A = Away; H = Home; N = Neutral; B = Bye; W = Win; D = Draw; L = Loss; X = Bye

==== Matches ====
Win Draw Loss Fixtures

18 October 2024 1	Central Coast Mariners	0–0	Melbourne Victory	Gosford
19:35 AEDT		Report		Stadium: Industree Group Stadium; Attendance: 6,953; Referee: Alireza Faghani

26 October 2024 2	Adelaide United	1–1	Central Coast Mariners	Adelaide
16:30 ACDT	Jovanović 10'	Report	Ngor 62'	Stadium: Coopers Stadium; Attendance: 9,826; Referee: Jonathan Barreiro

2 November 2024 3	Central Coast Mariners	0–0	Perth Glory	Gosford
17:00 AEDT		Report		Stadium: Industree Group Stadium; Attendance: 7,718; Referee: Nathan Shakespear

10 November 2024 4	Central Coast Mariners	0–3	Wellington Phoenix	Gosford
16:00 AEDT		Report	Ishige 15'; Barbarouses 40'; Sutton 53'	Stadium: Industree Group Stadium; Attendance: 6,493; Referee: Alex King

22 November 2024 5	Newcastle Jets	1–2	Central Coast Mariners	Sydney
20:00 AEDT	Aquilina 64'	Report	Kaltak 66'; Šušnjar 75' (o.g.)	Stadium: Allianz Stadium; Attendance: 5,156; Referee: Shaun Evans

8 December 2024 7	Central Coast Mariners	2–1	Sydney FC	Gosford
18:00 AEDT	Kuol 58', 70'	Report	Klimala 65'	Stadium: Industree Group Stadium; Attendance: 6,191; Referee: Adam Kersey

13 December 2024 8	Central Coast Mariners	0–4	Adelaide United	Gosford
19:35 AEDT		Report	Goodwin 12'; Kikianis 49'; Mauk 60'; Dukuly 73'	Stadium: Industree Group Stadium; Attendance: 4,108; Referee: Jonathan Barreiro

23 December 2024 9	Macarthur FC	1–1	Central Coast Mariners	Sydney
19:00 AEDT	De Silva 11'	Report	Eames 53'	Stadium: Campbelltown Sports Stadium; Attendance: 4,448; Referee: Adam Kersey

28 December 2024 10	Central Coast Mariners	1–4	Auckland FC	Gosford
17:00 AEDT	McCalmont 15'	Report	Sakai 12'; Brimmer 31'; May 39'; Rogerson 84'	Stadium: Industree Group Stadium; Attendance: 6,338; Referee: Shaun Evans

31 December 2024 11	Central Coast Mariners	1–1	Melbourne City	Gosford
19:00 AEDT	Paull 68'	Report	Souprayen 33'	Stadium: Industree Group Stadium; Attendance: 11,542; Referee: Tim Danaskos

3 January 2025 12	Brisbane Roar	1–3	Central Coast Mariners	Brisbane
19:35 AEDT	Halloran 71'	Report	Shour 11' (o.g.); Steele 81'; De Lima 90+5'	Stadium: Suncorp Stadium; Attendance: 6,122; Referee: Adam Kersey

11 January 2025 13	Sydney FC	4–1	Central Coast Mariners	Sydney
19:35 AEDT	Klimala 11'; Segecic 72', 83', 90+4'	Report	Steele 40'	Stadium: Allianz Stadium; Attendance: 11,111; Referee: Daniel Elder

17 January 2025 15	Western Sydney Wanderers	1–3	Central Coast Mariners	Sydney
19:35 AEDT	Temelkovski 85'	Report	Kuol 14'; Edmondson 69'; Doka 90+4'	Stadium: CommBank Stadium; Attendance: 6,718; Referee: Alex King

25 January 2025 16	Wellington Phoenix	0–0	Central Coast Mariners	Christchurch
17:00 NZDT		Report		Stadium: Apollo Projects Stadium; Attendance: 14,064; Referee: Tim Danaskos

29 January 2025 14	Western United	2–2	Central Coast Mariners	Melbourne
19:00 AEDT	Botic 33'; Botic 74'	Report	Doka 39'; Edmondson 42'	Stadium: Ironbark Fields; Attendance: 2,476; Referee: Daniel Elder

1 February 2025 17	Central Coast Mariners	2–2	Newcastle Jets	Gosford
19:35 AEDT	Paull 39'; Faisal 50'	Report	Rose 59'; Natta 87'	Stadium: Industree Group Stadium; Attendance: 9,145; Referee: Jonathan Barreiro

7 February 2025 18	Perth Glory	1–1	Central Coast Mariners	Perth
18:45 AWST	Taggart 8'	Report	Eames 61'	Stadium: HBF Park; Attendance: 5,139; Referee: Adam Kersey

22 February 2025 20	Central Coast Mariners	0–4	Western Sydney Wanderers	Gosford
17:00 AEDT		Report	Sapsford 6'; Clisby 13'; Milanovic 40'; Antonsson 72' (pen.)	Stadium: Industree Group Stadium; Attendance: 7,723; Referee: Adam Kersey

28 February 2025 21	Central Coast Mariners	1–3	Western United	Gosford
19:35 AEDT	Imai 76' (o.g.)	Report	Botic 52'; Vickery 81'; Ruhs 90+1'	Stadium: Industree Group Stadium; Attendance: 4,481; Referee: Ben Abraham

8 March 2025 22	Melbourne Victory	3–0	Central Coast Mariners	Melbourne
19:35 AEDT	Velupillay 9'; Fornaroli 41'; Machach 90+2'	Report		Stadium: AAMI Park; Attendance: 8,206; Referee: Shaun Evans

16 March 2025 23	Auckland FC	2–2	Central Coast Mariners	Auckland
17:00 NZDT	May 10'; Elliot 78'	Report	Feijão 71'; Duarte 90'	Stadium: Go Media Stadium; Attendance: 14,040; Referee: Adam Kersey

30 March 2025 24	Central Coast Mariners	3–1	Perth Glory	Gosford
15:00 AEDT	Kuol 5'; Doka 21' (pen.); Theoharous 58'	Report	Pennington 10'	Stadium: Industree Group Stadium; Attendance: 4,639; Referee: Jonathan Barreiro

5 April 2025 25	Melbourne City	1–0	Central Coast Mariners	Melbourne
17:00 AEDT	Memeti 29'	Report		Stadium: AAMI Park; Attendance: 6,656; Referee: Lachlan Keevers

12 April 2025 26	Newcastle Jets	6–0	Central Coast Mariners	Newcastle
19:35 AEST	Šušnjar 17'; Sainsbury 45' (o.g.); Wilmering 48'; Taylor 50'; Adams 73', 90+2'	Report		Stadium: McDonald Jones Stadium; Attendance: 6,822; Referee: Declan Woods

20 April 2025 27	Central Coast Mariners	2–2	Macarthur FC	Gosford
17:00 AEST	Sainsbury 15'; De Lima 29'	Report	Boli 22'; Sawyer 49'	Stadium: Industree Group Stadium; Attendance: 4,481; Referee: Alex King

2 May 2025 29	Central Coast Mariners	1–2	Brisbane Roar	Gosford
19:35 AEST	De Lima 3'	Report	Klein 17', 50'	Stadium: Industree Group Stadium; Attendance: 3,287; Referee: Ben Abraham

=== Australia Cup ===
The playoff and subsequent rounds for the 2024 Australia Cup were held during the pre-season.

7 August 2024 Round of 32	Heidelberg United	3–1 (a.e.t.)	Central Coast Mariners	Melbourne
19:30 AEST	Pin 43' (pen.), 104'; Ellis 120+1'	Report	Doka 52'	Stadium: Olympic Village; Attendance: 2,077; Referee: Alex King

The playoff round for the 2025 Australia Cup will be held just after the regular season.

13 May 2025 Play-offs	Central Coast Mariners	2–3 (a.e.t.)	Perth Glory	Darwin
19:00 ACST	Majekodunmi 40' (o.g.); Kuol 44'	Report	Pearman 59'; Taggart 65'; Bugarija 98'	Stadium: Larrakia Park; Attendance: 1,496; Referee: Lachlan Keevers

=== AFC Champions League Elite ===
==== League stage ====
Pos	Team	Pld	W	D	L	GF	GA	GD	Pts	Qualification
8	(China) Shanghai Port	8	2	2	4	10	18	−8	8	Advance to round of 16
9	(South Korea) Pohang Steelers	7	2	0	5	9	17	−8	6	
10	(South Korea) Ulsan HD	7	1	0	6	4	16	−12	3	
11	(Australia) Central Coast Mariners	7	0	1	6	8	18	−10	1	
12	(China) Shandong Taishan	0	0	0	0	0	0	0	0	Withdrawn, record expunged (Note: Shandong Taishan were considered to have withdrawn from the AFC Champions League Elite after the club confirmed that it did not intend to report for their league stage match against Ulsan HD on 19 February 2025. Their remaining fixture was cancelled, with their seven played matches being expunged.)

Source: Asian Football Confederation
Rules for classification: 1) points; 2) goal difference; 3) number of goals scored; 4) number of matches won; 5) penalty shoot-out if only two teams remain tied and played each other on the final matchday 6) fair play ranking; 7) drawing of lots
Notes:

Round	1	2	3	4	5	6	7	8
Ground	A	H	A	H	A	H	H	A
Result	L	L	L	D	L	L	L	L
Position	10	11	11	11	11	12	12	11
Points	0	0	0	1	1	1	1	1

Source: Ultimate A-League
A = Away; H = Home; W = Win; D = Draw; L = Loss

17 September 2024 1	Shandong Taishan (China)	3–1	(Australia) Central Coast Mariners	Jinan, China
18:00 UTC+8	Bi Jinhao 8'; Qazaishvili 74', 88'	Report	Doka 45+9' (pen.)	Stadium: Jinan Olympic Sports Center Stadium; Attendance: 16,896; Referee: Khalid Saleh Al-Turais (Saudi Arabia)

1 October 2024 2	Central Coast Mariners (Australia)	1–2	(Thailand) Buriram United	Gosford, Australia
18:00 UTC+10	Mauragis 90+5'	Report	Bissoli 30'; Good 50'	Stadium: Central Coast Stadium; Attendance: 3,483; Referee: Nazmi Nasaruddin (Malaysia)

22 October 2024 3	Shanghai Port (China)	3–2	(Australia) Central Coast Mariners	Shanghai, China
18:00 UTC+8	Li Ang 2'; Wu Lei 41'; Vargas 86'	Report	Doka 61'; Duarte 90+4'	Stadium: Pudong Football Stadium; Referee: Sadullo Gulmurodi (Tajikistan)

5 November 2024 4	Central Coast Mariners (Australia)	2–2	(China) Shanghai Shenhua	Gosford, Australia
19:00 UTC+11	Ngor 75'; Brandtman 90+5'	Report	André Luis 50'; Yu Hanchao 64'	Stadium: Central Coast Stadium; Attendance: 3,080; Referee: Mohanad Qasim Sarray (Iraq)

26 November 2024 5	Vissel Kobe (Japan)	3–2	(Australia) Central Coast Mariners	Kobe, Japan
19:00 UTC+9	Kikuchi 40'; Roux 49' (o.g.); Sasaki 81'	Report	Yamaguchi 54' (o.g.); Brandtman 74'	Stadium: Noevir Stadium Kobe; Referee: Omar Mohamed Al-Ali (United Arab Emirates)

3 December 2024 6	Central Coast Mariners (Australia)	0–4	(Japan) Yokohama F. Marinos	Gosford, Australia
18:30 UTC+11		Report	Inoue 6', 30'; Lopes 36'; Amano 70'	Stadium: Central Coast Stadium; Attendance: 1,864; Referee: Rustam Luftullin (Uzbekistan)

11 February 2025 7	Central Coast Mariners (Australia)	1–2	(Malaysia) Johor Darul Ta'zim	Gosford, Australia
19:00 UTC+11	Kuol 70'	Report	Álvaro 64', 79'	Stadium: Central Coast Stadium; Attendance: 1,610; Referee: Ko Hyung-jin (South Korea)

18 February 2025 8	Kawasaki Frontale (Japan)	2–0	(Australia) Central Coast Mariners	Kawasaki, Japan
19:00 UTC+9	Erison 36' (pen.); Marcinho 90+8'	Report		Stadium: Uvance Todoroki Stadium by Fujitsu; Attendance: 11,013; Referee: Sivakorn Pu-udom (Thailand)

== Statistics ==
=== Appearances and goals ===
Includes all competitions. Players with no appearances not included in the list.

As of 13 May 2025

No.	Pos.	Nat.	Name	A-League Men		Australia Cup		AFC Champions League Elite		2025 Australia Cup play-off		Total	
No.	Pos.	Nat.	Name	Apps	Goals	Apps	Goals	Apps	Goals	Apps	Goals	Apps	Goals
1	GK	(Australia)	Adam Pavlesic	1	0	1	0	3+1	0	0	0	6	0
3	DF	(Vanuatu)	Brian Kaltak	26	1	1	0	7	0	1	0	35	1
4	DF	(Australia)	Trent Sainsbury	15+1	0	0	0	2	0	0	0	18	1
5	DF	(Australia)	Noah Smith	2+1	0	0+1	0	0	0	0	0	4	0
7	FW	(Australia)	Christian Theoharous	14+6	1	0	0	2+3	0	0+1	0	26	1
8	MF	(Northern Ireland)	Alfie McCalmont	19+2	1	1	0	6+1	0	1	0	29	1
9	FW	(Australia)	Alou Kuol	21+4	4	1	0	6+2	1	1	1	35	6
10	MF	(Brazil)	Mikael Doka	26	3	1	1	7	2	1	0	35	6
11	FW	(Brazil)	Vitor Feijão	7+12	1	1	0	5+2	0	0	0	27	1
12	DF	(Australia)	Lucas Mauragis	17+1	0	1	0	8	1	1	0	28	1
15	DF	(New Zealand)	Storm Roux	17+5	0	1	0	5+2	0	0	0	30	0
16	MF	(Australia)	Harry Steele	23+2	2	0	0	6+1	0	0+1	0	33	2
21	FW	(Australia)	Abdelelah Faisal	2+9	1	0	0	2	0	0+1	0	14	1
23	MF	(Australia)	Miguel Di Pizio	5+5	0	1	0	2	0	1	0	14	0
24	DF	(Australia)	Diesel Herrington	4+7	0	0+1	0	2+1	0	0+1	0	16	0
26	MF	(Malaysia)	Brad Tapp	3	0	1	0	3	0	0	0	7	0
27	DF	(Australia)	Sasha Kuzevski	7+8	0	0+1	0	2+3	0	0	0	21	0
28	MF	(Kenya)	William Wilson	1+4	0	0+1	0	0+1	0	0	0	7	0
29	FW	(Australia)	Nicholas Duarte	0+10	1	0	0	0+2	1	0+1	0	13	2
30	GK	(Australia)	Jack Warshawsky	0	0	0	0	0+1	0	0	0	1	0
33	DF	(Australia)	Nathan Paull	22+1	1	1	0	5	0	1	0	30	1
35	FW	(Australia)	Arthur De Lima	6+3	3	0	0	0+3	0	1	0	13	3
36	MF	(Australia)	Haine Eames	12+8	2	0	0	2+3	0	1	0	26	2
37	FW	(Australia)	Bailey Brandtman	5+8	0	0+1	0	1+6	2	1	0	22	2
40	GK	(Australia)	Dylan Peraić-Cullen	25	0	0	0	5	0	1	0	31	0
44	MF	(Malta)	Lucas Scicluna	0+4	0	0	0	0	0	0+1	0	5	0
99	FW	(England)	Ryan Edmondson	6+5	2	0+1	0	6+1	0	0	0	19	2
Player(s) transferred out but featured this season
17	FW	(Australia)	Sabit Ngor	0+9	1	0	0	1+5	1	0	0	15	2

=== Disciplinary record ===
Includes all competitions. The list is sorted by squad number when total cards are equal. Players with no cards not included in the list.

As of 13 May 2025

Rank	No.	Pos.	Nat.	Name	A-League Men			Australia Cup			AFC Champions League Elite			2025 Australia Cup play-off			Total		
Rank	No.	Pos.	Nat.	Name	Yellow card	(yellow card) (yellow-red card)	Red card	Yellow card	(yellow card) (yellow-red card)	Red card	Yellow card	(yellow card) (yellow-red card)	Red card	Yellow card	(yellow card) (yellow-red card)	Red card	Yellow card	(yellow card) (yellow-red card)	Red card
1	15	DF	(New Zealand)	Storm Roux	1	0	1	0	0	0	0	0	0	0	0	0	1	0	1
1	40	GK	(Australia)	Dylan Peraić-Cullen	1	0	0	0	0	0	0	0	1	0	0	0	1	0	1
3	1	GK	(Australia)	Adam Pavlesic	0	0	0	0	0	0	0	0	1	0	0	0	0	0	1
4	4	DF	(Australia)	Trent Sainsbury	7	0	0	0	0	0	0	0	0	0	0	0	7	0	0
5	3	DF	(Vanuatu)	Brian Kaltak	2	0	0	0	0	0	3	0	0	0	0	0	5	0	0
5	7	FW	(Australia)	Christian Theoharous	4	0	0	0	0	0	1	0	0	0	0	0	5	0	0
5	8	MF	(Northern Ireland)	Alfie McCalmont	6	0	0	0	0	0	0	0	0	0	0	0	6	0	0
5	9	FW	(Australia)	Alou Kuol	3	0	0	1	0	0	1	0	0	0	0	0	5	0	0
9	10	MF	(Brazil)	Mikael Doka	3	0	0	0	0	0	1	0	0	0	0	0	4	0	0
9	16	MF	(Australia)	Harry Steele	4	0	0	0	0	0	0	0	0	0	0	0	4	0	0
11	11	FW	(Brazil)	Vitor Feijão	3	0	0	0	0	0	0	0	0	0	0	0	3	0	0
11	12	DF	(Australia)	Lucas Mauragis	2	0	0	0	0	0	1	0	0	0	0	0	3	0	0
11	24	DF	(Australia)	Diesel Herrington	3	0	0	0	0	0	0	0	0	0	0	0	3	0	0
11	27	DF	(Australia)	Sasha Kuzevski	2	0	0	0	0	0	1	0	0	0	0	0	3	0	0
11	33	DF	(Australia)	Nathan Paull	3	0	0	0	0	0	0	0	0	0	0	0	3	0	0
16	99	FW	(England)	Ryan Edmondson	1	0	0	0	0	0	1	0	0	0	0	0	2	0	0
17	29	FW	(Australia)	Nicholas Duarte	1	0	0	0	0	0	0	0	0	0	0	0	1	0	0
17	36	MF	(Australia)	Haine Eames	1	0	0	0	0	0	0	0	0	0	0	0	1	0	0
Player(s) transferred out but featured this season
1	17	FW	(Australia)	Sabit Ngor	1	0	0	0	0	0	1	0	0	0	0	0	2	0	0
Total					48	0	1	1	0	0	0	0	0	10	0	2	59	0	3

=== Clean sheets ===
Includes all competitions. The list is sorted by squad number when total clean sheets are equal. Numbers in parentheses represent games where both goalkeepers participated and both kept a clean sheet; the number in parentheses is awarded to the goalkeeper who was substituted on, whilst a full clean sheet is awarded to the goalkeeper who was on the field at the start of play. Goalkeepers with no clean sheets not included in the list.

As of 13 May 2025

Rank	No.	Nat.	Goalkeeper	A-League Men	Australia Cup	AFC Champions League Elite	2025 Australia Cup play-off	Total
1	40	(Australia)	Dylan Peraić-Cullen	3	0	0	0	3
Total				3	0	0	0	3

== See also ==
- 2024–25 Central Coast Mariners FC (A-League Women) season
- List of Central Coast Mariners FC seasons
