= Dylan Peraić-Cullen =

Australian association footballer

Personal information
- Full name: Dylan Peraić-Cullen
- Date of birth: 25 July 2006 (age 20)
- Place of birth: Canberra, Australia
- Height: 1.96 m (6 ft 5 in)
- Position: Goalkeeper

Youth career
- Woden Valley SC
- 2017–2022: Gungahlin United
- 2023–2024: Central Coast Mariners

Senior career*
Years	Team	Apps	(Gls)
2023–	CCM Academy	16	(0)
2023–2026	Central Coast Mariners	25	(0)

International career^{‡}
2024–	Australia U20	3	(0)
2025–	Australia U23	1	(0)
- * Club domestic league appearances and goals as of 18 October 2026 ‡ National team caps and goals as of 25 March 2025

Dylan Peraić-Cullen (Croatian: [pɛˈraitɕ]; born 25 July 2006) is an Australian soccer player who plays as a goalkeeper. He is currently a free agent, having most recently played for the Central Coast Mariners.

== Club career ==
Peraić-Cullen begun his football career playing his youth football for Gungahlin United in the National Premier Leagues Capital Football youth competitions, starting at the club in Under 13s.

=== Central Coast Mariners ===
In 2022, Peraić-Cullen played in a trial match for the Capital All-Stars against Central Coast Mariners in Canberra, and impressed the Mariners enough that he was soon signed by the club to join their academy set up for the 2023 season. Peraić-Cullen featured for the Mariners Academy in their National Premier Leagues NSW and U20 teams over the 2023 and 2024 seasons, whilst training with the A-League squad on a scholarship contract.

Following the retirement of captain and club legend Danny Vukovic, Peraić-Cullen was one of three young goalkeepers at the Mariners vying for the number one goalkeeper spot for the Mariners for the 2024-25 A-League season, along with Adam Pavlesic and Jack Warshawsky. Peraić-Cullen was chosen to make his professional debut for the Mariners first match of the A-League season, becoming the youngest ever starting goalkeeper for the club, and the youngest in the history of the A-League to start a match and keep a clean sheet. After round 4 of the A-League season, Peraic-Cullen signed his first full professional contract, until the end of the 2026–27 season.

== International career ==
Peraić-Cullen was part of the Young Socceroos squad for the 2024 ASEAN U-19 Boys Championship, making three appearances in the tournament.
