= Mikael Doka =

Brazilian footballer

Personal information
- Full name: Antonio Mikael Rodrigues Brito
- Date of birth: 24 January 2000 (age 26)
- Place of birth: Fortaleza, Brazil
- Height: 1.70 m (5 ft 7 in)
- Positions: Right-back; right winger

Team information
- Current team: Operário Ferroviário
- Number: 2

Youth career
- 2010–2021: Santos

Senior career*
Years	Team	Apps	(Gls)
2018–2023	Santos	0	(0)
2022	→ FC Cascavel (loan)	20	(1)
2023	→ São Joseense (loan)	21	(5)
2023–2026	Central Coast Mariners	55	(6)
2025	→ Ventforet Kofu (loan)	2	(0)
2026–	Operário Ferroviário	38	(0)
- * Club domestic league appearances and goals as of 18 November 2026

Antonio Mikael Rodrigues Brito (born 24 January 2000), known as Mikael Doka or just Doka, is a Brazilian footballer who plays as a right-back or right winger for Operário Ferroviário in the Campeonato Brasileiro Série B.

== Club career ==
=== Santos ===
Born in Fortaleza, Ceará, Doka joined Santos' youth setup in August 2010, at the age of ten. He made his senior debut with the B-team on 11 August 2018, playing the last ten minutes of a 1–0 home win against Água Santa, for the year's Copa Paulista.

On 5 October 2018, Doka signed his first professional contract with the club, agreeing to a three-year deal. On 23 September 2021, he further extended his link for two more seasons.

On 20 December 2021, Doka was loaned to FC Cascavel for the ensuing Campeonato Paranaense. He made his professional debut the following 27 January, coming on as a late substitute in a 2–1 home win over União.

Doka scored his first senior goal on 10 February 2022, netting a last-minute winner through a direct free kick in a 2–1 home success over Paraná. On 28 October, his loan was extended for the 2023 season, but was released by the club on 13 January 2023 on a mutual agreement.

On 17 January 2023, Doka was announced at São Joseense. On 7 July, he left Santos after 13 years.

=== Central Coast Mariners ===
On 2 August 2023, Doka signed for Central Coast Mariners of the A-League Men. Doka scored his first goal for the club against Western Sydney Wanderers at Central Coast Stadium on 18 February 2024, converting a penalty to score the only goal of the game.

Doka was part of the Mariners' Championship, Premiership and AFC Cup winning 2023-24 season. in his first season with the club. Doka was also named AFC Cup MVP, and won the A-League player of the month award for April. At the conclusion of the season, Doka signed a new three-year contract extension to remain at the Mariners.

The 2024-25 season wasn't as fruitful for the team, finishing the season in 10th, however Doka won the Mariners Medal as their player of the season.

==== Ventforet Kofu (loan) ====
After the end of the 2024-25 A-League season, Doka joined Ventforet Kofu on a 6 month loan deal to play out the rest of the 2025 J2 League season, with his loan set to expire on 31 December 2025.

=== Operário Ferroviário ===
Following the end of his loan spell in Japan, it was announced in January 2026 that Doka had been sold to Operário Ferroviário Esporte Clube for an undisclosed fee.

== Career statistics ==
As of 19 August 2024

Club	Season	League			State League		Cup		Continental		Other		Total	
Club	Season	Division	Apps	Goals	Apps	Goals	Apps	Goals	Apps	Goals	Apps	Goals	Apps	Goals
Santos	2018	Série A	0	0	—		0	0	—		3 (Note: Appearance(s) in Copa Paulista)	0	3	0
Santos	2019	Série A	0	0	—		0	0	—		—		0	0
Santos	2020	Série A	0	0	—		0	0	0	0	—		0	0
Santos	2021	Série A	0	0	0	0	0	0	0	0	6	0	6	0
Santos	Total		0	0	0	0	0	0	0	0	9	0	9	0
FC Cascavel (loan)	2022	Série D	11	0	9	1	2	0	—		—		22	1
São Joseense (loan)	2023	Série D	10	2	11	3	—		—		—		21	5
Central Coast Mariners	2023–24	A-League Men	29	3	—		1	0	13	4	—		43	7
Central Coast Mariners	2024–25	A-League Men	0	0	—		1	0	0	0	—		1	0
Central Coast Mariners	Total		29	3	0	0	2	0	13	4	9	0	44	0
Career total			50	5	20	4	4	0	13	0	9	0	96	12

== Honours ==
Central Coast Mariners

- A-League Men Championship: 2023–24
- A-League Men Premiership: 2023–24
- AFC Cup: 2023–24

Individual

- AFC Cup Most Valuable Player: 2023–24
- Mariners Medal: 2024-25
- A-League Men Player of the Month: April 2024
