= Haine Eames =

Australian soccer player

- Eames playing for Central Coast Mariners in 2026

Personal information
- Full name: Haine Anthony Eames
- Date of birth: 27 February 2008 (age 18)
- Place of birth: Laurieton, New South Wales, Australia
- Position: Central midfielder

Team information
- Current team: Central Coast Mariners
- Number: 6

Youth career
- Camden Haven Redbacks
- 2022–2024: Central Coast Mariners

Senior career*
| Years | Team | Apps | (Gls) |
| 2024–2025 | CCM Academy | 9 | (0) |
| 2024– | Central Coast Mariners | 41 | (2) |

International career^{‡}
| 2024–2025 | Australia U17 | 6 | (0) |
| 2025– | Australia U20 | 7 | (0) |
- * Club domestic league appearances and goals as of 1 September 2026 ‡ National team caps and goals as of 22 November 2026

Haine Anthony Eames (/iːmz/ EEMZ; born 27 February 2008) is an Australian soccer player who plays as a central midfielder for the Central Coast Mariners. In late 2024, he became his club's youngest player, starter and goalscorer of all time, all while aged 16.

== Club career ==
A student at the Central Coast Sports College, Eames joined the Central Coast Mariners academy at under-15 level, having previously played for Camden Haven Redbacks. In his second season in the youth ranks, he played in the under-18 and under-20 teams. In June 2024, having already been involved in training with the first team, he signed a three-year scholarship contract for the reigning champions under head coach Mark Jackson. He mentioned Max Balard as a first-team player he aimed to replicate.

In October 2024, Eames was named by New South Wales newspaper The Daily Telegraph as one of the state's teenagers likely to break through in the upcoming A-League Men season. He made his debut on 18 October as the campaign began with a goalless draw at home to Melbourne Victory, with him coming on as a substitute for Harry Steele for the last four minutes, he becoming the youngest player in Mariners' history. Four days later he made his continental debut in the AFC Champions League Elite, again as a late replacement for Steele in a 3–2 league stage loss away to Shanghai Port in China.

On 23 December 2024, Eames became the Mariners' youngest starter on his sixth A-League appearance, and scored the equaliser in a 1–1 draw away to Macarthur. Aged 16 years and 300 days, he became his club's youngest goalscorer and the fourth youngest in the history of the league; the club record had been held by Garang Kuol since 2021. On 18 February 2025, as the club's Asian campaign ended with a 2–0 loss away to Kawasaki Frontale in Japan, they fielded a team with an average age of 21. Eames wore the captain's armband for the final 20 minutes after Steele's substitution, and still aged 16, he was the youngest captain in the tournament's history.

== Youth international career ==
Eames was part of the Australia side at the 2024 ASEAN U-16 Boys Championship in Indonesia. He scored his attempt in the 8–7 penalty shootout win over Thailand in the final.

He was called up in May 2025 for the Australia men's national under-18 soccer team, to take part in the 2025 UEFA Friendship Cup commencing in early June.
