= Ryan Edmondson =

English footballer (born 2001)

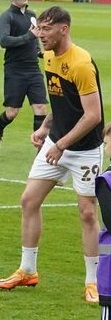
- Edmondson with for Port Vale in 2022.

Personal information
- Full name: Ryan David Edmondson
- Date of birth: 20 May 2001 (age 25)
- Place of birth: Harrogate, England
- Height: 6 ft 2 in (1.88 m)
- Position: Striker

Team information
- Current team: St Patrick's Athletic
- Number: 27

Youth career
- 2015–2017: York City

Senior career*
Years	Team	Apps	(Gls)
2017	York City	1	(0)
2017–2022	Leeds United	2	(0)
2020–2021	→ Aberdeen (loan)	14	(2)
2021	→ Northampton Town (loan)	21	(2)
2021–2022	→ Fleetwood Town (loan)	11	(0)
2022	→ Port Vale (loan)	19	(3)
2022–2024	Carlisle United	41	(5)
2024–2026	Central Coast Mariners	35	(6)
2026–	St Patrick's Athletic	36	(10)

International career
2019	England U19	3	(1)
- * Club domestic league appearances and goals as of 23:31, 30 October 2026 (UTC)

Ryan David Edmondson (born 20 May 2001) is an English professional footballer who plays as a striker for League of Ireland Premier Division club St Patrick's Athletic.

Edmondson began his career at York City, making his first-team debut at the age of 16 in October 2017. He was signed by Leeds United for an undisclosed fee the following month and made his debut in the Championship in May 2018. He was called up to the England national under-19 team and scored one goal in three appearances. He spent the first half of the 2020–21 season on loan at Scottish Premiership club Aberdeen and spent the second half of the season with Northampton Town. He was loaned out to Fleetwood Town for the 2021–22 season but was recalled early in January to find more game time with Port Vale. He helped the club earn promotion to League One via the League Two play-offs in 2022. He joined Carlisle United on a free transfer in June 2022 and won a second successive League Two play-off final in 2023.

He joined Australian club Central Coast Mariners in January 2024. He helped his new team to a treble in his first season, winning the A-League Championship, A-League premiership and AFC Cup at the end of the 2023–24 season. He returned to Europe in January 2026, signing for Irish club St Patrick's Athletic.

== Early life ==
Ryan David Edmondson was born on 20 May 2001 in Harrogate, North Yorkshire. He grew up as a Leeds United supporter and was a season ticket holder prior to signing for the club.

== Career ==
=== York City ===
Edmondson joined York City's academy in 2015 after being rejected by Huddersfield Town. He made his first-team debut in the National League North on 7 October 2017, when being substituted on in the 72nd minute in a 2–1 win over Brackley Town at Bootham Crescent. At the age of 16 years and 140 days, he became the third youngest player in the club's history. Manager Martin Gray said that the player had the potential to reach the Premier League.

=== Leeds United ===
Edmondson was signed by Championship club Leeds United on 15 November 2017, on a scholarship contract until June 2020 for an undisclosed fee. After impressing in the youth teams during the spring, Edmondson debuted for Leeds in the Championship on the last day of the season, 6 May 2018, as a 73rd-minute substitute in a 2–0 home victory against Queens Park Rangers, aged 16 years and 351 days. Manager Paul Heckingbottom praised the teenager's attitude after the match, though admitted that he had a long way to go before being ready to play regular first-team football.

Edmondson signed a new three-year contract with Leeds on 7 August 2018. At a later date he signed a new contract to keep him at Elland Road until summer 2023, though the club did not report the news at the time. He made one league appearance as a substitute for the first-team but thrived in the under-23 team, scoring 18 times during the 2018–19 season and, on 6 May, was part of the team who won the Professional Development League (Category 2) final in a 4–2 penalty shoot-out win (0–0 after extra time) against Birmingham City. Leeds were promoted into the Premier League at the end of the 2019–20 season, leaving Edmondson to need loan moves in order to find first-team football, though he would be closely monitored by head coach Marcelo Bielsa.

==== Aberdeen loan ====
On 31 July 2020, Edmondson joined Scottish Premiership club Aberdeen on loan until January 2021. His debut came in their first match of the season as a 65th-minute substitute in a 1–0 defeat at home to Rangers. Manager Derek McInnes stated that "I thought when Edmondson came on that he gave us a bit more psychically and it annoyed their centre backs a bit more with his running power and his physical size". However soon afterwards he sustained an ankle injury in training, which was expected to prevent him from playing for a few months. However, he returned to the team earlier than expected, coming on as a substitute against Motherwell on 20 September. He scored his first goals for Aberdeen when he scored twice in a 4–2 win over Hamilton Academical on 20 October. He found game time hard to come by as he had originally been signed as a replacement for Sam Cosgrove, who was expected to leave but ended up staying at Pittodrie, and Edmondson returned to Leeds United at the end of his loan in January 2021.

==== Northampton Town loan ====
On 14 January 2021, Edmondson joined League One club Northampton Town on loan until the end of the 2020–21 season. Manager Keith Curle had originally tried to sign him in the summer. He scored his first goal for the club on 6 March, in a 4–1 win over Portsmouth at Sixfields; he was awarded the goal by the dubious goals committee as it had been initially credited to teammate Sam Hoskins, whose chip was heading for the net before being bungled over the line by Edmondson. He ended the loan spell with two goals from 21 appearances. However he was dropped by manager Jon Brady after coming into personal difficulties.

==== Fleetwood Town loan ====
Edmondson joined League One club Fleetwood Town on 11 June 2021 on loan for the 2021–22 season. He struggled to establish himself at Highbury under both Simon Grayson and Stephen Crainey, and scored just two goals in 17 games before being recalled by Leeds United on 4 January 2022.

==== Port Vale loan ====
On 4 January 2022, he was loaned out to League Two club Port Vale for the rest of the season. Manager Darrell Clarke said that "he fits the profile of the type player that we were looking for particularly with his presence, mobility and his touch". Edmondson scored his first goal for the "Valiants" on 1 February, his flicked header opening the scoring in a 1–1 draw with Forest Green Rovers at Vale Park. He was an unused substitute as Vale secured promotion to League One via the 2022 League Two play-offs with victory over Mansfield Town in the final at Wembley Stadium.

=== Carlisle United ===
Edmondson returned to League Two permanently on 23 June 2022 when he signed a two-year contract with Carlisle United on a free transfer. He scored his first league goal for the Cumbrians on 22 October, in a 3–2 defeat at Brunton Park, though was sent off for violent conduct on opposition player Darren Pratley. He dislocated his shoulder during a 2–1 defeat at Northampton Town on 20 December, which saw him ruled out of action for an "extended period". Assistant manager Gavin Skelton said that he was ahead of schedule by returning to fitness in March. He scored six goals from 30 appearances during the 2022–23 season, and converted his penalty in the shoot-out victory over Stockport County in the 2023 League Two play-off final.

Speaking in August 2023, manager Paul Simpson said that Edmondson spent too much time out on the wings and would improve by staying in position as a central striker. On 18 January 2024, he departed the club by mutual consent to pursue a career in Australia.

=== Central Coast Mariners ===
On 26 January 2024, Edmondson joined A-League Men club Central Coast Mariners on a two-and-a-half-year contract. The move saw him reunite with former Leeds United youth coach Mark Jackson. On 13 February, Edmondson his first career hat-trick in a 4–0 win over Phnom Penh Crown in the AFC Cup Zonal semi-finals. He was part of the Mariners' Championship, Premiership and AFC Cup winning 2023–24 season. In the A-League Grand final, Edmondson scored a brace in a 3–1 victory over Melbourne Victory and was awarded the Joe Marston Medal as the best player of the match. The AFC Cup title was secured with a 1–0 victory over Lebanese side Al Ahed. He suffered a shoulder injury in the AFC Champions League Elite in February 2025 and was ruled out for the rest of the 2024–25 season. On 26 January 2026, he left the club, having scored nine goals in 48 appearances in all competitions during his time there.

=== St Patrick's Athletic ===
On 27 January 2026, Edmondson signed for League of Ireland Premier Division club St Patrick's Athletic. On 8 February, he made his debut for the club in the opening game of the season, a 0–0 draw with Bohemians at the Aviva Stadium. On 6 March, Edmondson scored his first goals for the club, scoring a spectacular volley to give them the lead, followed by a back post header to put them 2–0 up in an eventual 3–2 victory away to Shelbourne in the Dublin Derby at Tolka Park. The following week, he scored the equaliser with a front post header from a James Brown corner in an eventual 4–1 win at home to Drogheda United at Richmond Park. On 3 April, he scored his side's second goal in a 4–1 win at home to Sligo Rovers. On 24 April, Edmondson scored a brace in a 3–1 victory at home to Dublin rivals Bohemians, putting his side back top of the league and taking him to the top of the league's goalscoring charts. On 1 May, he opened the scoring with a back post header from a Zack Elbouzedi cross in an eventual 2–2 draw with Galway United at Eamonn Deacy Park. On 8 May, he scored the final goal of the game in a 4–1 victory at home to Waterford. On 3 July, Edmondson ended a six-game goal drought by opening the scoring in a 3–0 win over Galway United at Richmond Park. He then went on a ten-game goal drought in all competitions before scoring the final goal in a 4–0 win away to Dundalk on 14 September with a header after coming off the bench, for his tenth goal of the season. At the club's end of season awards, his volley away to Shelbourne in March was voted by the supporters as the St Patrick's Athletic Goal of the Season for 2026.

== International career ==
Edmondson received his first international call-up for the England national under-19 team's friendlies against Greece and Germany in September 2019. He made his debut on 5 September when starting against Greece at St George's Park, scoring in the 60th minute of a 3–1 win. He finished his career with the under-19s with three appearances, which all came in 2019, scoring one goal. While in the England underage sides, he played alongside future senior internationals Bukayo Saka, Anthony Gordon and Curtis Jones.

== Style of play ==
Head of Academy Coaching at Leeds United Richard Cresswell described Edmondson as a striker with "a bit of everything", with his strengths being heading, work rate and hold-up play. Edmondson has praised Marcelo Bielsa, his former manager at Leeds with improving him as a player.

== Career statistics ==
As of match played 30 October 2026

Appearances and goals by club, season and competition
Club	Season	League			National cup (Note: Includes FA Cup, Australia Cup & FAI Cup)		League cup (Note: Includes Scottish League Cup, EFL Cup)		Other		Total	
Club	Season	Division	Apps	Goals	Apps	Goals	Apps	Goals	Apps	Goals	Apps	Goals
York City	2017–18	National League North	1	0	0	0	—		—		1	0
Leeds United	2017–18	Championship	1	0	0	0	—		—		1	0
Leeds United	2018–19	Championship	1	0	0	0	0	0	—		1	0
Leeds United	2019–20	Championship	0	0	0	0	0	0	—		0	0
Leeds United	Total		2	0	0	0	0	0	0	0	2	0
Aberdeen (loan)	2020–21	Scottish Premiership	14	2	—		1	0	1 (Note: Appearance in UEFA Europa League)	0	16	2
Northampton Town (loan)	2020–21	League One	21	2	—		—		—		21	2
Fleetwood Town (loan)	2021–22	League One	11	0	1	0	1	0	4 (Note: Appearances in EFL Trophy)	2	17	2
Port Vale (loan)	2021–22	League Two	19	3	—		—		2 (Note: Appearances in League Two play-offs)	0	21	3
Carlisle United	2022–23	League Two	23	4	1	1	1	1	5 (Note: Two appearances in EFL Trophy, three in League Two play-offs)	0	30	6
Carlisle United	2023–24	League One	18	1	1	0	1	0	2	0	22	1
Carlisle United	Total		41	5	2	1	2	1	7	0	52	7
Central Coast Mariners	2023–24	A-League Men	15	4	0	0	—		7 (Note: Appearances in AFC Cup)	3	22	7
Central Coast Mariners	2024–25	A-League Men	11	2	1	0	—		7 (Note: Appearances in AFC Champions League Elite)	0	19	2
Central Coast Mariners	2025–26	A-League Men	9	0	0	0	—		0	0	9	0
Central Coast Mariners	Total		35	6	1	0	0	0	14	3	50	9
St Patrick's Athletic	2026	LOI Premier Division	36	10	3	0	—		0	0	39	10
Career total			180	28	7	1	4	1	28	5	219	35

== Honours ==
Port Vale

- EFL League Two play-offs: 2022

Carlisle United

- EFL League Two play-offs: 2023

Central Coast Mariners

- A-League Men Championship: 2023–24
- A-League Men Premiership: 2023–24
- AFC Cup: 2024

Individual

- Joe Marston Medal: 2024
- St Patrick's Athletic Goal of the Season: 2026 (vs. Shelbourne)
