= William Wilson (footballer, born 2001) =

Kenyan footballer (born 2001)

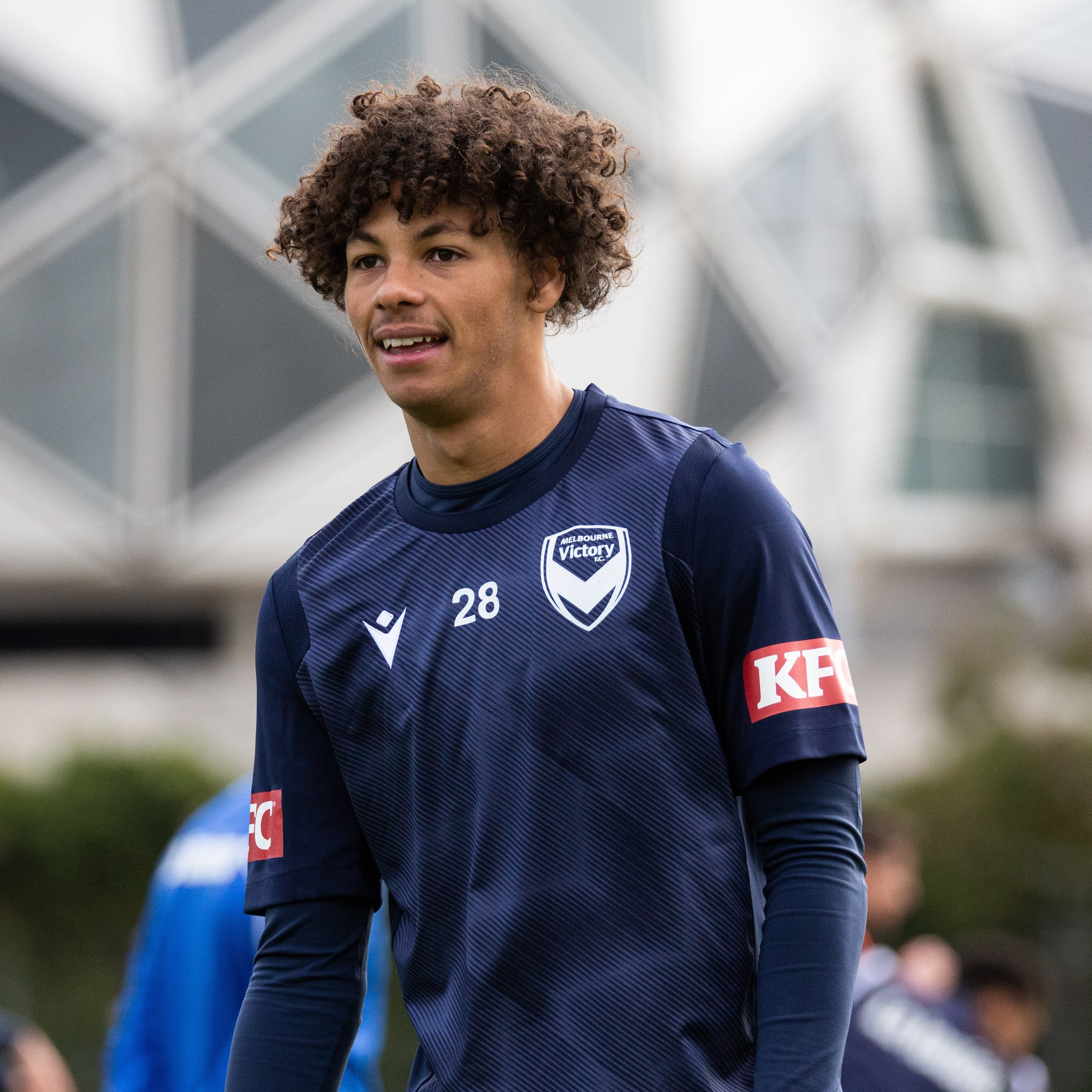
- Wilson with Melbourne Victory in 2022

Personal information
- Full name: William Lenkupae Wilson
- Date of birth: 23 December 2001 (age 24)
- Place of birth: Australia
- Position: Central midfielder

Team information
- Current team: FC Tulsa
- Number: 66

Youth career
- Box Hill United
- 2017–2023: Melbourne Victory

Senior career*
Years	Team	Apps	(Gls)
2018–2023	Melbourne Victory NPL	49	(9)
2021–2023	Melbourne Victory	10	(0)
2023–2025	Central Coast Mariners	15	(1)
2025	Vaasan Palloseura	11	(0)
2026–	FC Tulsa	12	(1)

International career^{‡}
2025–	Kenya	16	(1)
- * Club domestic league appearances and goals as of 10 November 2026 ‡ National team caps and goals as of 21 November 2026

William Lenkupae Wilson (born 23 December 2001) is a footballer who plays as a midfielder for FC Tulsa. Born in Australia, he plays for the Kenya national team.

== Club career ==
=== Melbourne Victory ===
He made his professional debut in a FFA Cup playoff match against Perth Glory on 24 November 2021. On 16 February 2022 he made first league appearance for Melbourne Victory against Western Sydney Wanderers. Wilson made his starting debut for the club in a 2–1 loss to Central Coast Mariners on the 2022 New Year's Eve fixture. On 26 August 2023 he was released by Melbourne Victory and signed for Central Coast Mariners.

=== Central Coast Mariners ===
Wilson made his debut for the Central Coast Mariners in an away AFC Cup tie against Terengganu FC in Malaysia. He scored his first A-League goal in an F3 Derby, scoring the Mariners' second goal in a 3–1 win at home on 25 November 2023.

Wilson was part of the Mariners' 2023–24 premiership and 2023–24 AFC Cup winning season.

At the end of the 2024–25 season, Wilson was released by the Mariners.

=== Vaasan Palloseura ===
On 25 July 2025, Wilson signed for Finnish side Vaasan Palloseura.

=== FC Tulsa ===
In August 2026, FC Tulsa announced the signing of Wilson for the remainder of the 2026 USL Championship season.

== International career ==
Wilson was born in Australia to a Kenyan father of Samburu ethnicity, and an Australian mother. He received his first international call-up for the Kenya national team in March 2025 for their 2026 World Cup Qualifying matches against Gambia and Gabon. On 20 March, he scored on his debut in a three-goal draw against Gambia.

== Career statistics ==
=== International ===
As of match played 10 October 2024
Kenya score listed first, score column indicates score after each Wilson goal

List of international goals scored by William Wilson
No.	Date	Venue	Cap	Opponent	Score	Result	Competition	Ref.
1	20 March 2025	Alassane Ouattara Stadium, Abidjan, Ivory Coast	1	Gambia	3–3	3–3	2026 FIFA World Cup qualification	

== Honours ==
Central Coast Mariners

- A-League Men Championship: 2023–24
- A-League Men Premiership: 2023–24
- AFC Cup: 2023–24
