= Sasha Kuzevski =

Australian association footballer

Personal information
- Full name: Sasha Stefan Kuzevski
- Date of birth: 27 March 2001 (age 25)
- Place of birth: Gosford, Australia
- Height: 1.75 m (5 ft 9 in)
- Position: Defender

Team information
- Current team: Blacktown City

Youth career
- 2013-2014: Central Coast Mariners
- 2015: APIA Leichhardt
- 2016: Marconi Stallions
- 2017-2024: Central Coast Mariners

Senior career*
Years	Team	Apps	(Gls)
2022–2025	Central Coast Mariners	23	(0)
2026–	Blacktown City	3	(1)
- * Club domestic league appearances and goals as of 3 July 2026

Sasha Kuzevski (born 27 March 2001) is an Australian professional soccer player who plays for Blacktown City in the National Premier Leagues NSW, having previously come through the youth academy and played for Central Coast Mariners. Kuzevski primarily plays as a wing back or anywhere on the right side of the pitch.

== Club career ==
=== Central Coast Mariners ===
Kuzevski, a Central Coast native, joined the youth academy of local A-League club Central Coast Mariners at the age of 12. During his teenage years, Kuzevski spent time at APIA Leichhardt and Marconi Stallions before returning to the Mariners as a 16 year old.

Kuzevski worked his way up through the age groups of the Mariners academy, and was part of the team that won the U20s NPL2 Grand Final in 2020. In 2022, Kuzevski was part of the academy's first grade team which won the NSW League One premiership and achieved promotion to the National Premier Leagues NSW competition for the following season, and also played in the League One Grand Final at the end of that season, which the Mariners lost to St George City.

Kuzevski received a scholarship contract from the club to be part of their first team squad for the 2022-23 A-League season. Kuzevski made his A-League debut on 17 December 2022, in a home victory over Sydney FC, and a month later had his scholarship extended until the end of the season. That season turned out to be a highly successful one, as Kuzevski was part of the Mariners' 2022-23 championship winning squad.

In June 2023, Kuzevski ruptured his anterior cruciate ligament (ACL) and also suffered a Meniscus tear, ruling him out for a year. Whilst unable to play due to his recovery from injury, Kuzevski was part of the Mariners squad that won the 2023-24 A-League premiership and championship and 2023-24 AFC Cup.

Having successfully recovered from his injuries, Kuzevski was upgraded to a full A-League contract with the Mariners for the 2024-25 season. Kuzevski made his return to competitive football on 29 June 2024, captaining the Mariners' NPL first grade team in a 3-0 victory over North West Sydney Spirit at Pluim Park, and his return to the Mariners senior team in a 2024 Australia Cup tie against Heidelberg United FC on 7 August 2024.

At the end of the 2024-25 season, Kuzevski was released by the Mariners.

=== Blacktown City ===
After over a year as a free agent while recovering from injury, Kuzevski joined Blacktown City in the National Premier Leagues NSW competition for the second half of the 2026 season. Scoring his first goal in a 3-0 win against St George City at Landen Stadium.

== Honours ==
Central Coast Mariners

- 2 x A-League Men Championship: 2022-23, 2023-24
- A-League Men Premiership: 2023-24
- AFC Cup: 2023-24
