= Vitor Feijão =

Brazilian footballer

Personal information
- Full name: Vitor Correia da Silva
- Date of birth: 1 August 1996 (age 30)
- Place of birth: São Paulo, Brazil
- Height: 1.69 m (5 ft 7 in)
- Position: Forward

Team information
- Current team: Caxias
- Number: 11

Youth career
- Paraná

Senior career*
Years	Team	Apps	(Gls)
2015–2018	Paraná	39	(4)
2016	→ Jacuipense (loan)	2	(0)
2016	→ Coritiba (loan)	0	(0)
2018	→ Criciúma (loan)	27	(6)
2019–2020	Ceará	9	(2)
2019	→ Guarani (loan)	12	(0)
2020	→ Figueirense (loan)	14	(1)
2020	Paysandu	13	(1)
2021	Boavista	11	(1)
2021–2022	Kukësi	33	(6)
2022	→ Shakhtyor Soligorsk (loan)	9	(0)
2023	Londrina	6	(0)
2023–2024	Caxias	35	(3)
2024–2025	Central Coast Mariners	19	(1)
2025	Kapaz	9	(1)
2026–	Caxias	12	(2)
- * Club domestic league appearances and goals as of 10 November 2026

Vitor Correia da Silva (born 1 August 1996), known as Vitor Feijão is a Brazilian footballer as a forward for Caxias.

== Club career ==
=== Paraná ===
Born in São Paulo, Feijão is a graduate of the youth academy of Paraná. On 16 October 2015, he was called to the senior team for a Série B match against Esporte Clube Vitória; making his debut and replacing Edér in the 1–1 draw.

Deemed surplus to the club's requirements Feijão joined Jacuipense on a loan deal on 2 March 2016. However he returned to his parent club in early April. In May, he was loaned to Série A club Coritiba after having renewed his contract till 2017.

On 9 January 2017, Feijão's contract was extended till the end of the season. In February, he suffered a muscle injury during a game against PSTC and was ruled out of play for 10 months. After recovering from injury, he returned to play in August, scoring a goal against Juventude in a 2–0 win. On 9 September, he signed a contract extension, which would keep him at the club till 2018. At the end of the season, his side was promoted to Série A after 10 years.

In Série A, Feijão found his playing time limited due to the arrival of Léo Itaperuna and Silvinho. Consequently, he joined Criciúma on a loan deal on 30 May 2018.

=== Ceará ===
On 18 December 2018, Feijão joined Ceará for the upcoming season. On 7 June 2019 Guarani FC confirmed, that they had loaned Feijão for the rest of the season. In June, he moved to the Belarusian Shakhtar from Soligorsk.

=== Central Coast Mariners ===
On 1 August 2024, Feijão joined Central Coast Mariners for the upcoming season signing a two-year-deal. Feijão made his debut for the club on 7 August 2024, in a 2024 Australia Cup round of 32 tie against Heidelberg United. Feijão left the club after one season making 27 appearances in all competitions and scored just one goal.

=== Kapaz ===
On 8 August 2025, Feijão joined Azeri club Kapaz.

=== Caxias return ===
On 6 January 2026, Caxias announced the signing of Feijão.

== Career statistics ==
As of match played on 9 July 2024

Club	Season	League			State League		Cup		Continental		Other		Total	
Club	Season	Division	Apps	Goals	Apps	Goals	Apps	Goals	Apps	Goals	Apps	Goals	Apps	Goals
Paraná	2015	Série B	1	0	0	0	—		—		—		1	0
Paraná	2016	Série B	—		0	0	0	0	—		—		0	0
Paraná	2017	Série B	17	3	4	0	4	0	—		—		25	3
Paraná	2018	Série A	3	0	10	1	1	0	—		—		14	1
Paraná	Total		21	3	14	1	5	0	—		—		40	4
Jacuipense (loan)	2016	Baiano A1	—		2	0	—		—		—		2	0
Criciúma (loan)	2018	Série B	27	6	—		—		—		—		27	6
Ceará	2019	Série A	0	0	4	1	1	0	—		4	1	9	2
Guarani (loan)	2019	Série B	12	0	—		—		—		—		12	0
Figueirense (loan)	2020	Série B	4	0	8	1	2	0	—		—		14	1
Paysandu	2020	Série C	12	1	—		—		—		1	0	13	1
Boavista	2021	Carioca	—		10	0	1	1	—		—		11	1
Kukësi	2021–22	Kategoria Superiore	32	6	—		3	0	—		—		35	6
Shakhtyor Soligorsk (loan)	2022	Belarusian Premier League	5	0	—		—		4	0	—		9	0
Londrina	2022	Série B	6	0	—		—		—		—		6	0
Caxias	2023	Série D	11	1	—		—		—		—		11	1
Caxias	2024	Série C	9	0	13	2	2	0	—		—		24	2
Caxias	Total		20	1	13	2	2	0	—		—		35	3
Career total			139	17	51	5	14	1	4	0	5	1	213	24
