= Abdelelah Faisal =

Australian soccer player

Personal information
- Full name: Abdelelah Ghazi Faisal
- Date of birth: 27 October 2005 (age 21)
- Place of birth: Auburn, Australia
- Height: 1.78 m (5 ft 10 in)
- Position: Winger

Team information
- Current team: Al-Karma
- Number: 21

Youth career
- Auburn FC
- –2022: Parramatta FC
- 2024: Macarthur FC

Senior career*
Years	Team	Apps	(Gls)
2022	Parramatta FC	1	(0)
2023	Mt Druitt Town Rangers	24	(2)
2024	Bulls FC Academy	19	(10)
2024–2025	Perth Glory	10	(3)
2025–2026	Central Coast Mariners	15	(1)
2026–	Al-Karma	2	(2)

International career^{‡}
2024–	Australia U20	2	(1)
- * Club domestic league appearances and goals as of 13 May 2026 ‡ National team caps and goals as of 14 November 2024

Abdelelah Ghazi Faisal (Arabic: عبد الإله غازي فيصل; pronounced [ʕab.dilˈlɛːh ˈɣæː.zi ˈfeɪ.sæl]; born 27 October 2005) is an Australian professional soccer player who plays for Iraqi Stars League club Al-Karma.

== Career ==
=== Early years ===
Faisal played at National Premier Leagues NSW club Mt Druitt Town Rangers FC where he made appearances in the 2023 Australia Cup, including a starting spot in the teams win over National Premier Leagues ACT club Canberra Croatia FC. He was soon signed by Macarthur FC's academy side Bulls FC Academy, where he showed immense promise for the NSW League One side, scoring back-to-back hat-tricks against Canterbury Bankstown FC in a 6–1 victory, and then in the next competitive fixture against Inter Lions in a 6–0 demolition.

=== Perth Glory ===
Impressed by his performances in the New South Wales State Leagues, Faisal was one of the first signings by Perth Glory for the 2024-25 A-League Men season. Perth's Football Director, former Socceroo Stan Lazaridis likened him to Egyptian Premier League star Mohamed Salah.

Faisal would repay the faith shown in him immediately, in Perth's 2024 Australia Cup play-off against Brisbane Roar, netting twice as Perth qualified through a 4–2 win in Darwin.

In January 2025, he departed the club by mutual consent to allow him to return to his family in New South Wales.

=== Central Coast Mariners ===
In January 2025 Faisal returned to New South Wales and signed an 18-month deal with Central Coast Mariners.

=== Al-Karma ===
After his departure from the Mariners, Faisal signed for Iraqi Stars League side Al-Karma.
