= Jack Warshawsky =

Australian association football player

Personal information
- Full name: Jack Desmond Warshawsky
- Date of birth: 8 August 2004 (age 22)
- Place of birth: Caboolture, Australia
- Height: 1.85 m (6 ft 1 in)
- Position: Goalkeeper

Team information
- Current team: Melbourne Victory
- Number: 1

Youth career
- –2020: Brisbane Roar
- 2020–2023: Western Sydney Wanderers
- 2023–2025: Central Coast Mariners

Senior career*
Years	Team	Apps	(Gls)
2023	Western Sydney Wanderers NPL	3	(0)
2022–2023	Western Sydney Wanderers	0	(0)
2023–2025	CCM Academy	25	(0)
2023–2025	Central Coast Mariners	0	(0)
2025	Oakleigh Cannons	6	(0)
2025–	Melbourne Victory	16	(0)

International career
2019–2021	Australia U17	2	(0)
2025–	Australia U20	8	(0)
- * Club domestic league appearances and goals as of 10 February 2026

Jack Desmond Warshawsky (/wɔːrˈʃɔːski/ wor-SHAW-skee, Polish: [varˈʂafski]; born 8 August 2004) is an Australian professional footballer who plays as a goalkeeper for Melbourne Victory.

== Career ==
As a junior, Warshawsky played in several age groups of the Brisbane Roar academy, including their Y-League team in the 2019-20 season, and represented Australia at the 2019 AFF Under 15 Championship in Chonburi, Thailand.

=== Western Sydney Wanderers ===
In July 2020, Warshawsky joined the Western Sydney Wanderers academy, where he played for their youth team, including in the National Premier Leagues NSW team in 2023. Warshawsky also held a scholarship contract to be part of the Wanderers senior squad for the 2022-23 A-League season, however didn't make an appearance. Towards the end of that season, it was reported that Warshawsky would leave the Wanderers to sign with the Central Coast Mariners, and shortly after the end of the Wanderers' season it was confirmed that Warshawsky had been released by the club.

=== Central Coast Mariners ===
A day after his departure from Western Sydney was announced, it was announced that Warshawsky had signed for the Central Coast Mariners on a two-year deal. Warshawsky made his senior football debut in the first match of the Mariners' new season, an Australia Cup Round of 32 match against Sydney FC at WIN Stadium in Wollongong. The match ended in a 3-3 draw, and was followed by a long penalty shootout which saw all eleven players take a penalty, and Warshawsky save the penalty attempt of Adrian Segecic, however ultimately it was Warshawsky's penalty attempt which was saved by his counterpart, Andrew Redmayne, that ended the match. While mainly serving as the goalkeeping back-up to captain Danny Vukovic throughout the 2023-24 season, Warshawsky made two further appearances for the Mariners in the AFC Cup, and was part of their treble-winning squad who won the AFC Cup, A-League Championship and A-League Premiership.

In the 2024-25 season, Warshawsky made his solitary appearance against Buriram United in the AFC Champions League Elite, following a red card to Adam Pavlesic. At the conclusion of the season, Warshawsky left the Mariners after two seasons and three titles.

=== Oakleigh Cannons ===
Following the end of the A-League season and his departure from the Mariners, Warshawsky joined the Oakleigh Cannons for the final two months of the 2025 National Premier Leagues Victoria competition. Warshawsky made 6 appearances out of a possible 8 for the season.

=== Melbourne Victory ===
Having found himself some regular playing time for Oakleigh Cannons in the second-tier of Australian football between A-League seasons, Warshawsky returned to the A-League for the 2025-26 season, signing with Melbourne Victory.

== Honours ==
Central Coast Mariners

- A-League Men Championship: 2023-24
- A-League Men Premiership: 2023-24
- AFC Cup: 2023-24
