= Noah Smith (soccer) =

Australian soccer player (born 2000)

Personal information
- Full name: Noah Smith
- Date of birth: 15 December 2000 (age 25)
- Place of birth: Adelaide, Australia
- Position: Left-back

Youth career
- Cumberland United
- SA NTC
- 2015–2018: Adelaide United

Senior career*
Years	Team	Apps	(Gls)
2018–2021	Adelaide United NPL	52	(3)
2020–2021	Adelaide United	10	(0)
2021–2022	Central Coast Mariners	10	(1)
2022–2023	Melbourne Victory	7	(0)
2023	Brisbane Roar	6	(0)
2023–2025	Central Coast Mariners	6	(0)
2025–	Adelaide City	1	(0)
- * Club domestic league appearances and goals as of 26 June 2025

Noah Smith (born 15 December 2000) is an Australian professional soccer player who plays as a left-back. Smith is currently a free agent, having most recently played for the Central Coast Mariners in the A-League. He has previously played for Adelaide United, Brisbane Roar, and Melbourne Victory.

== Club career ==
=== Adelaide United ===
In October 2020, Smith signed a one-year scholarship deal with Adelaide United. In June 2021, he was released by Adelaide United.

=== Central Coast Mariners ===
A month after leaving Adelaide United, Smith joined Central Coast Mariners for the 2021–22 A-League Men season. He made his debut for the Mariners against APIA Leichhardt on 21 December 2021 in the FFA Cup, scoring the final goal in a 6–0 win. Smith departed the Mariners after one season, making 11 appearances in all competitions.

=== Melbourne Victory ===
On 10 June 2022, Melbourne Victory announced the signing of Noah Smith. Smith made 7 appearances for the Victory, before departing the club on a free transfer midway through his first season at the club.

=== Brisbane Roar ===
In February 2023, upon departing Melbourne Victory, Smith joined Brisbane Roar on a 1½ year contract. Smith made his debut for the Roar against his former club, Central Coast Mariners, on 10 February 2023.

=== Return to Central Coast Mariners ===
In August 2023, Smith returned to Central Coast Mariners, signing a two-year contract. Smith was part of the Mariners' 2023-24 premiership winning season, in his first season back at the club. Smith also won the 2023-24 AFC Cup with the club that same season.

At the end of the 2024-25 season, Smith was released by the Mariners.

== Honours ==
Central Coast Mariners

- A-League Men Premiership: 2023-24
- AFC Cup: 2023-24
