= Adam Pavlesic =

Australian soccer player

Personal information
- Date of birth: 30 July 2002 (age 24)
- Place of birth: Fairfield, Australia
- Height: 1.89 m (6 ft 2 in)
- Position: Goalkeeper

Team information
- Current team: Sydney United 58
- Number: 1

Youth career
- Sydney United 58
- Parramatta FC
- 2017–2019: Sydney FC

Senior career*
Years	Team	Apps	(Gls)
2019–2024	Sydney FC NPL	61	(0)
2020–2024	Sydney FC	3	(0)
2024–2025	CCM Academy	7	(0)
2024–2026	Central Coast Mariners	1	(0)
2026–	Sydney United 58	31	(0)

International career^{‡}
2017–2019	Australia U17	13	(0)
Medal record
Men's football
Representing Australia
AFF U-16 Youth Championship
Third place	2017 Thailand	U-17 Team
- * Club domestic league appearances and goals as of 19 October 2026 ‡ National team caps and goals as of 26 November 2020

Adam Pavlesic (Croatian: [ˈpavlesitɕ]; born 30 July 2002) is an Australian professional soccer player who plays as a goalkeeper for Sydney United 58.

== Career ==
=== Sydney FC ===
Pavlesic joined Sydney FC in 2017, as a 15 year old. In December 2019, 17-year-old Pavlesic was granted permission by Sydney to travel to Europe following invitations from Italian side AS Roma and French side RC Strasbourg to train with their academies. The offers came on the back of the youngsters performances for the Joeys in their 2019 FIFA U-17 World Cup campaign.

On 26 November 2020, he made his professional debut for Sydney in the club's 2020 AFC Champions League 1–0 loss against Jeonbuk Hyundai Motors.

On 2 April 2022, Pavlesic made his A-League debut during Round 21 of the 2021–22 season against Western Sydney in the Sydney Derby, which Sydney won 3–2.

On 9 December 2023, Pavlesic returned to first-team action with Sydney, after more than 20 months since his last appearance for the Sky Blues, in the club's 2–0 loss at home against Macarthur. The 21-year-old replaced forward Patrick Wood following a 15th minute red card for first choice goalkeeper Andrew Redmayne, who was judged to have committed a handball offence.

With Redmayne suspended for a game, Pavlesic was chosen to start for Sydney in their 3–0 away loss against Melbourne Victory on 16 December. He returned to the bench following Redmayne's return from suspension.

Pavlesic departed Sydney FC at the end of the 2023–24 season.

=== Central Coast Mariners ===
Pavlesic joined the defending two-time A-League champions, the Central Coast Mariners, ahead of the 2024–25 season. Pavlesic made his debut for the club on 7 August 2024, in a 2024 Australia Cup round of 32 tie against Heidelberg United.

He made his continental debut in the AFC Champions League Elite with a 3–1 loss to Shandong Taishan, and followed that with a red card against Buriram United at home in Gosford when his side were already two goals down.

Having fallen out of favour at the Mariners, Pavlesic agreed to a mutual release of his contract in January 2026, after 1 and a half seasons at the club, to re-join his youth club, semi-professional Sydney United 58 FC.

== Personal life ==
Adam was born in Fairfield, New South Wales, a suburb of Western Sydney, to Linda and Steve Pavlešić. Pavlesic's brother, Anthony is a goalkeeper for Sigma Olomouc in Czechs first division, having also been with the Central Coast Mariners in their academy. Pavlesic is of Croatian descent.

== Honours ==
With Sydney United 58:

- (Australia) National Premier Leagues NSW Championship: 2026
- (Australia) Waratah Cup Champions: 2026

=== Individual ===
- (Australia) NSW NPL Team of the Year: 2026
