= 2015–16 Reading F.C. season =

Reading
2015–16 season
- Manager: Steve Clarke (until 4 December 2015); Martin Kuhl (interim, 4–17 December 2015); Brian McDermott (17 December 2015-27 May 2016); Jaap Stam (13 June 2016)
- Stadium: Madejski Stadium
- Championship: 17th
- FA Cup: Quarter-final (eliminated by Crystal Palace)
- League Cup: Third round (eliminated by Everton)
- Top goalscorer: League: Nick Blackman (11); All: Nick Blackman (13)
- Highest home attendance: 21,581 vs Leeds United (16 August 2015)
- Lowest home attendance: 12,949 vs Hull City (19 April 2016)
- Average home league attendance: League, 17,285; All, 17,184
Home colours	Away colours

The 2015–16 season was Reading's 145th year in existence and third consecutive season in the Championship, and covered the period from 1 July 2015 to 30 June 2016. Reading finished the season 17th in the Championship, whilst also reaching the quarter-finals of the FA Cup and the Third Round of the League Cup.

== Season review ==
=== Pre-season ===
Following the conclusion of the 2014–15 season, Reading announced that their preseason would include a tour of Thailand and Malaysia, beginning 5 July. Reading then announced, on 26 May 2015, that they would play a pre-season friendly against Bristol Rovers on 21 July 2015, and a day later announced a friendly match against Crawley Town would take place on 27 July. On 29 May 2015, Reading announced they will face Swansea City at Adams Park on 24 July 2015. On 1 June, Michael Hector signed a new three-year contract, keeping him at the club until the summer of 2018. On 3 June, the club announced six pre-season friendlies for the under-21 squad. On 16 June 2015, the first round draw for the Football League Cup was made, with Reading being drawn away against Colchester United. The next day, 17 June 2015, the fixtures for the forthcoming season were announced.

On 22 June 2015, Reading announced a new sponsorship deal with Thai energy drink company Carabao Dang for their home shirt during the 2015–16 season, and three days later Reading added Dave Beasant, Steven Reid, Jonathan Urwin and Stewart Bannister to the backroom staff. Youngster Tarique Fosu signed a new two-year contract with the club on 26 June. On 29 June, Thai Airways were announced as the club's away shirt sponsors for the 2015–16 season.

On 30 July, Jordan Obita signed a contract extension with the club until 2018.

==== Transfers ====
Following the conclusion of the 2014–15 season, Reading announced that they would not be renewing the contracts of Daniel Lincoln, Jonathan Henly, Aleksandar Gogic, Zat Knight, Jure Travner, George McLennan, Danny Guthrie, Ryan Edwards and Yakubu. The announcement also stated that Mikkel Andersen also wouldn't be offered a new deal at the time, whilst Adam Federici, Alex Pearce, Stephen Kelly and Jem Karacan had all been offered new contracts. On 27 May 2015, it was confirmed that Adam Federici had rejected the clubs offer and signed a three-year contract with A.F.C. Bournemouth. 12 days later, on 8 June 2015, Derby County announced that they had signed Alex Pearce on a three-year contract, ending his 14-year stay with Reading. On 25 June 2015, Mikkel Andersen returned to Denmark, signing for FC Midtjylland. On 8 July, Galatasaray confirmed the signing of Jem Karacan on a free transfer, following the expiration of his Reading contract at the end of the previous season. Jure Travner re-signed for NK Celje on 15 July, whilst Danny Guthrie joined Blackburn Rovers on 5 August 2015.

On 29 June 2015, Reading confirmed the signing of Orlando Sá on a three-year deal from Legia Warsaw, with Stephen Quinn signing a three-year deal the following day from Hull City. Paul McShane followed Quinn in signing for Reading from Hull City on the 2 July, penning a three-year deal. Youngster Jake Sheppard signed his first professional contract with Reading on 3 July, keeping him at the club until 2017. Goalkeeper Jonathan Bond joined Reading on 4 July, for a reported £250,000 from Watford, signing a three-year deal. On 14 July, Reading confirmed the Ali Al-Habsi had joined on a two-year contract, whilst youngster Niall Keown had signed a new three-year contract. On 15 July, Lisandro Semedo was signed from Sporting CP, whilst Rowan Liburd joined from Isthmian League side Billericay Town, on a two-year contract, on 22 July. On 29 July 2015, Kuhl joined RCD Mallorca on trial with a view to a season-long loan deal with the Spanish Segunda División side. Sultan Al Harthy from Arsenal Soccer School Oman joined the club on trial at the end of July.

Defender Andrew Taylor joined Reading on a season-long loan from Wigan Athletic on 5 August, with Craig Tanner moving to Plymouth Argyle on loan to Plymouth Argyle on the same day until January 2016. Young keeper joined Chesham United on a Four-Month loan deal two days later, before midfielder Jake Taylor left on a season-long loan to Motherwell, and Hope Akpan joined Blackburn Rovers on a permanent deal on 11 August. The following day Reading announced the signing of Paolo Hurtado on a three-year contract from Paços de Ferreira. On 18 August, midfielder Álex Fernández joined the club on a season-long loan deal from RCD Espanyol.

On 20 August 2015, Robert Dickie joined Cheltenham Town on a one-month loan deal, with Pavel Pogrebnyak moving back to Russia on 27 August 2015, signing for Dynamo Moscow. On 31 August, Lasha Dvali signed for MSV Duisburg on a free transfer, with Lucas Piazon signing a season-long loan deal from Chelsea on the same day.

On transfer deadline day, Reading sold defender Michael Hector to Chelsea, before loaning him back for the remainder of the season, loaned out Aaron Kuhl to Dundee United until 4 January 2016, and signed Matěj Vydra and Ola John join the club on season-long loan deal from Watford and Benfica respectively.

=== August ===
Reading started the 2015–16 season with a 2–1 defeat to Birmingham City, away at St Andrew's, on 8 August. Birmingham went 2–0 up through goals from David Cotterill and Jon Toral either side of half-time, before Nick Blackman just before the hour mark and Orlando Sá had a 98th-minute penalty saved. Three days later, Reading defeated Colchester United 1–0, after extra time, in the League Cup with the goal coming from Chris Gunter. On 16 August, Reading hosted Leeds United in a scoreless draw, before visiting Sheffield Wednesday three days later in a game that finished 1–1. Danny Williams scored Reading's goal in the 49th minute before Modou Sougou scored a 90th-minute equaliser. Reading played out their third draw of the season on 22 August, a 0–0 home game against MK Dons before a midweek Second Round League Cup victory over Portsmouth on 25 August. Portsmouth took the lead in the 40th minute through Conor Chaplin, before second half goals from Nick Blackman and Garath McCleary gave Reading the victory. Reading ended August with a 3–1 victory away to Brentford on 29 August, with the goals coming from Sá, a double from Nick Blackman, and Lasse Vibe scoring for Brentford.

=== September ===
On 9 September, Aaron Tshibola signed a new contract with the club, keeping him at Reading until the summer of 2019. On 11 September, youngster Harry Cardwell joined Woking F.C. on loan until the end of October. The same day, Reading hosted Ipswich Town, with a final score of 5–1. Sá scored a hat-trick, with a strike by Blackman and a 25-yard goal from Norwood in the 87th minute adding to the score. Four days later, on 15 September, Reading lost 1–0 to Derby County. Tom Ince scored the winner for Derby in the 69th minute after Sá received a red card for an off-the-ball incident during first-half stoppage time. On 18 September, Dominic Samuel signed a new contract with the club on a deal until the summer of 2018. The following day, Bristol City hosted Reading, who produced a 0–2 win from early goals from Blackman and McCleary. On 22 September, Reading hosted Everton in the third round of the League Cup. Despite a first-half goal by Blackman, second-half goals from a corner and a free kick gave Everton a 1–2 win and thus knocking Reading out of the competition. On 23 September, Robert Dickie extended his loan at Cheltenham Town for another month. Reading's last match of the month was on 26 September away to Burnley, where goals from Blackman and Lucas Piazon in the first 10 minutes saw Reading through to a 1–2 win and move to 3rd place in the league.

=== October ===
On 3 October Reading hosted second-place Middlesbrough at the Madejski Stadium. Within 15 seconds of kick-off, Hal Robson-Kanu crossed the ball to Danny Williams who headed the ball in, scoring Reading's third-fastest goal. Blackman added to Reading's lead in the 88th minute with a penalty. On 8 October, manager Steve Clarke and forward Nick Blackman were nominated for September's "Manager of the Month" and "Player of the Month" awards respectively, whilst later the same day defender Jake Cooper extended his contract with the club until the summer of 2018. On 9 October, Reading played a behind-closed-doors friendly against West Ham United at the Boleyn Ground. The teams were level 2–2 at half-time thanks to goals from Piazon, a Blackman penalty and two from Mauro Zárate. After the break, Tshibola put Reading ahead before a West Ham own goal extended the lead. Andy Carroll pulled one back for West Ham, with the final score 3–4. Later on in the same day, Simon Cox joined Bristol City until the beginning of January 2016.

Harry Cardwell returned to the club on 12 October, whilst Noor Husin joined Hemel Hempstead Town. On 16 October, youngster Sean Long joined League Two side Luton Town on an initial one-month loan deal, whilst fellow U21 defender Rob Dickie extended his loan at Cheltenham Town for another month.

Following the mid-October International break for UEFA Euro 2016 qualifying, Reading hosted Charlton Athletic on 17 October. A 76th-minute header by Blackman was the only goal of the game, giving Reading three points and moving the club up to second place in the league. On 19 October, academy graduate Jack Stacey signed a new contract with Reading, keeping him at the club until the summer of 2019. On 20 October, Reading played away to Rotherham United, where they drew 1–1 following Blackman's 25-yard strike in the 26th minute. Reading's five-match unbeaten run in the league ended on 24 October away to Fulham. Despite Reading's two goals from Piazon and Sa before half-time, Fulham equalised within the first 10 minutes of the second half, later adding to their score to defeat Reading 4–2.

Reading's final match of the month was against Brighton and Hove Albion at the Madejski Stadium on 31 October. Top-of-the-league Brighton gained the lead shortly after half-time, before Matěj Vydra scored his first Reading goal to equalise. Reading ended the month one place below the playoff positions in 7th.

=== November ===
Reading's first match of November was hosting Huddersfield Town on 4 November. Despite Reading conceding in the second minute, Norwood scored a free kick in the 15th minute to level the score. A second Huddersfield goal took the score to 1–2 by half time; Reading substitute Ola John equalised in the 84th minute to gain the club a point for the 2–2 draw and remain 7th in the league. On 7 November Reading lost 2–0 away to Cardiff City, and consequently dropped to 8th in the league. On 9 November it was reported that Colorado Rapids midfielder, Dillon Powers, had joined the club on a two-week trial. The following day it was announced that Kevin Foley was also training with the squad with the view to signing a short-term contract with the club. On 11 November, Tarique Fosu moved to League One side Fleetwood Town on loan until 2 January 2016, with Dominic Samuel joining Gillingham F.C. on loan until 10 December two days later.

On 18 November, manager Steve Clarke was linked with the vacant Fulham manager's job. The following day it was announced that Clarke would stay as manager of Reading. On 21 November, Reading defeated Bolton Wanderers at 2–1 at home, with Piazon and Williams supplying Reading's goals. On 23 November, Jack Stacey joined Barnet F.C. on a short-term loan deal. Three days later, on 26 November, Andrija Novakovich joined Cheltenham Town on loan until 2 January 2016, whilst Dominic Hyam joined Basingstoke Town until the same date.

Reading's last game of the month was on 28 November away to Nottingham Forest. Despite an early goal by Vydra, Reading lost 3–1 and dropped to 9th in the table; though just one point from the play-off positions.

=== December ===
On 3 December Reading suffered a 1–0 home defeat to Queens Park Rangers, dropping to 11th but remaining within one win of the play-offs. The following morning, 4 December, Steve Clarke was sacked as manager of the club, with Under-21 manager Martin Kuhl taking over in an interim role. On 7 December, Reading were drawn away to Huddersfield Town in the Third Round of the FA Cup. On 9 December, Samuel had his loan spell with Gillingham extended until 2 January 2016.

On 10 December, Rob Dickie extended his loan with Cheltenham Town until the end of January, with Aaron Kuhl returning early from his loan spell with Dundee United on 14 December.

Martin Kuhl's first game in charge of Reading was a loss away to Preston North End on 12 December. Shortly after half-time, Reading conceded a penalty which gave Preston the only goal of the match. Also on the 12th, youngster George Legg was recalled from his loan spell with Chesham United. Kuhl's second (and final) match managing Reading was a second away loss, when Reading were beaten 2–1 at Hull on 16 December. Blackman gave Reading the lead in the first half, but two second-half home goals (including a 90th-minute winner) made Reading slip to the bottom half of the league.

On 17 December, and after weeks of speculation, Brian McDermott returned to the club as their new manager. His first match was against Blackburn Rovers on 20 December, where Williams's 11th-minute volley gave Reading the lead and provided the match's only goal. On 24 December, Under-21 goalkeeper, George Legg, how had spent the first half of the season on loan at Chesham United joined Hampton & Richmond Borough on an initial 28-day youth loan. McDermott's next two games were losses; the first was a 1–0 away defeat to Wolverhampton Wanderers on 26 December, and the second a 2–1 home loss to Brentford on 28 December (during which Hector received a second yellow card for diving). A behind-closed-doors friendly at Hogwood Park on 30 December saw Reading beat QPR 4–2 in their final match of the year.

=== January ===
Reading hosted Bristol City on 2 January in their first game of the year. Reading won the match 1–0 from a 91st-minute goal by Blackman. Following the match, Bristol City confirmed that Simon Cox had returned to Reading following his loan spell at the club. On 9 January, Reading earned a third-round replay in the FA Cup following a 2–2 draw away to Huddersfield. Despite leading 1–2 in the 90th minute, Norwood conceded a penalty that Huddersfield converted to force the replay. On 12 January, Reading gained a 1–1 away draw at Derby which kept them 12th in the league. Reading's first defeat of the year was a 1–0 away loss to MK Dons on 16 January. Three days later, on 19 January, Reading hosted the replay of the FA Cup third round match against Huddersfield. After gaining a 0–2 lead by the 15th minute, Huddersfield lost Jonathan Hogg to a straight red card in the 27th minute. Piazon scored directly from the resultant free kick, before Vydra scored a hat-trick. A 93rd-minute goal by Férnandez saw Reading through to the fourth round with a 5–2 win. On 23 January, Reading played Sheffield Wednesday at home, drawing 1–1. The final match of the month was hosting Walsall in the fourth round of the FA Cup. Goals from Robson-Kanu and Williams, as well as two from Vydra, saw Reading progress into the fifth round with a 4–0 win.

==== Transfers ====
On 5 January, Dominic Samuel extended his loan stay at Gillingham until 28 January. The next day, 6 January, Nick Blackman moved to Derby County for an undisclosed fee, and Craig Tanner extended his loan deal at Plymouth Argyle until the end of the season.

On 19 January, Reading signed George Evans from Manchester City, with Yann Kermorgant signing an 18-month contract from Bournemouth the following day. The following week, on 25 January, Jake Taylor's loan with Motherwell was cancelled, going on to join Exeter City permanently later the same day. The following day Orlando Sá left the club, joining Israeli side Maccabi Tel Aviv, and on 28 January, Deniss Rakels moved to Reading from Polish side KS Cracovia, whilst Paolo Hurtado moved to Vitória on loan for the remainder of the season. On 1 February, transfer deadline day, Scotland U21 international Dominic Hyam moved to Dagenham & Redbridge on loan until 5 March, and Dominic Samuel extended his stay at Gillingham until the end of the season.

In early January, Bosnian U-17 international Seid Behram, who had been with the academy for a few months, signed permanently for the club from Željezničar, whilst Andrija Novakovich, Tariqe Fosu, Sean Long, Rob Dickie, Dominic Hyam, Lewis Collins, Bogdan Vaštšuk, Jake Sheppard, Noor Husin and Zak Jules all returned from their respective loan spells.

Reading took former Real Betis midfielder Javier Matilla on trial during the later half of January.

=== February ===
On 2 February Reading played away at Ipswich Town. After Reading conceded midway through the second half, McCleary scored a 69th-minute penalty before Ipswich took the lead in the 89th minute. Reading's 2–1 loss resulted in them dropping to 16th in the league. Reading saw Wolverhampton Wanderers to an eventless 0–0 draw at the Madejski Stadium on 6 February. Reading gained a further 0–0 draw on 13 February, hosting Burnley. On 18 February, Gunter signed a new two-year contract, keeping him at Reading until the summer of 2018. Reading's fifth-round FA Cup match against West Bromwich Albion took place on 20 February. Despite conceding after the half-time break, goals from McShane, Hector and Piazon gave a 3–1 victory and secured Reading's place in the quarter-finals for the second year running. Reading saw their first league win in over seven weeks with a 1–0 home victory against Rotherham United on 23 February. This was followed four days later with a 3–4 away win at Charlton Athletic, which saw both Kermorgant and Rakels score their first goals for Reading.

On 12 February, Liam Kelly joined Bath City on loan for a month, whilst Jake Sheppard joined Eastbourne Borough. On 27 February, goalkeeper Stuart Moore joined Peterborough United on a 28-day emergency loan.

=== March ===
On 4 March, Rowan Liburd joined Wycombe Wanderers F.C. on a one-month loan deal. On 7 March, it was announced that Polish midfielder Aleksander Jagiełło had joined the club on trial.

Huddersfield Town hosted Reading on 8 March, where a 3–1 home victory saw Reading drop three league places to 14th. Reading's FA Cup quarter final match against Crystal Palace took place on 11 March at the Madejski Stadium. After a goalless draw for 85 minutes, Reading conceded a penalty that also saw Cooper receive his second yellow card of the game. Despite Al Habsi's touch to the ball, Yohan Cabaye's spot kick gave Crystal Palace the lead before Fraizer Campbell increased the score to 2–0, knocking Reading out of the competition. Youngster Liam Kelly also extended his loan deal with Bath City for an additional month. A second consecutive league defeat occurred away to promotion hopefuls Brighton and Hove Albion on 15 March, with Reading subsequently placed 15th in the division. On the same day, young defender Sean Long joined Braintree Town on loan until the end of the season. The club's run of league defeats ended on 19 March with a 1–1 home draw against Cardiff City. The result saw them drop to 17th in the league, 8 points above of the relegation zone.

On 23 March, youngster Robert Dickie returned to Cheltenham Town on loan for the remainder of the season, with Jack Stacey and Tarique Fosu moving on loan to Carlisle United and Accrington Stanley for the remainder of the season the following day. Also on the 24th, Harry Cardwell joined Braintree Town, Hammed Lawal joined Bishop's Stortford and Lewis Ward joined Sutton United.

=== April ===
Reading's first game of the month was away to Bolton Wanderers on 2 April. In the 90th minute, Ola John made a 30-yard (27 m) strike to secure Reading three points. Reading had a second consecutive win on 5 April, hosting Nottingham Forest. Although trailing 0–1 at half-time, goals from Vydra and Norwood provided a 2–1 win. Reading's three-match winning streak came to an end on 9 April with a 0–2 home defeat to Birmingham City, in a game that was described as "disappointing". This was followed by a 2–1 away defeat to Middlesbrough on 12 April, during which an on-pitch incident between McShane and Williams resulted them both receiving a three-match ban from the FA for violent conduct. A further away loss came at Leeds on 16 April, with Reading subsequently placed 15th in the league. Reading had a fourth consecutive defeat when they lost 1–2 to Hull City on 19 April, although a 1–1 away draw at Queens Park Rangers on 23 April ended the losing form.

Reading's last game of the month, and last home game of the season, was a 1–2 defeat to Preston North End.

On 28 April it was announced that Hector and Piazon had returned to Chelsea after their loans were curtailed by a week.

=== May ===
On 2 May, Turkish U20 international midfielder, Anil Capkin, joined the club on a week long trial with a view to a summer move. The following day, 3 May 2016, Jack Stacey was recalled from his loan with Carlisle United a week early. On 5 May, young defender Tennai Watson signed a new two-year contract with the club, keeping him at Reading until the summer of 2018. On 5 May, under-21 keeper Lewis Ward joined Icelandic Úrvalsdeild side Fylkir on loan until 26 June 2016.

On 9 May, it was confirmed that Reading would not be renewing the contracts of Anton Ferdinand, Hal Robson-Kanu, Simon Cox, Nana Owusu, Pierce Sweeney, Lewis Collins, Noor Husin, Hammad Lawal, Samúel Friðjónsson, Conor Shaughnessy and Bogdan Vaštšuk. It was also confirmed that Dominic Hyam, Robert Dickie, Shane Griffin, Sean Long, Aaron Kuhl, Liam Kelly, Zak Jules, George Legg had all been offered new contacts, alongside Under-18 players Omar Richards, Harrison Bennett, Ryan East, Sam Smith, Luke Southwood, Billy Collings and Joe Tupper.

On 25 May, Reading announced the signing of Danzell Gravenberch for the upcoming 2016–17 season, and First Team Coach Chris Davies was leaving to be Brendan Rodgers Assistant Manager at Celtic on 1 June. On 27 May, manager Brian McDermott was fired. Jaap Stam was announced as McDermott's replacement on 13 June 2016.

== Transfers ==
=== In ===
Date	Position	Nationality	Name	From	Fee	Ref.
29 June 2015	FW	(Portugal)	Orlando Sá	Legia Warsaw	Undisclosed	
30 June 2015	MF	(Republic of Ireland)	Stephen Quinn	Hull City	Free transfer	
1 July 2015	MF	(Northern Ireland)	Lewis Collins	Academy	Trainee	
1 July 2015	GK	(England)	George Legg	Academy	Trainee	
2 July 2015	DF	(Republic of Ireland)	Paul McShane	Hull City	Free transfer	
3 July 2015	MF	(Scotland)	Jake Sheppard	Academy	Trainee	
4 July 2015	GK	(England)	Jonathan Bond	Watford	Undisclosed	
14 July 2015	GK	(Oman)	Ali Al-Habsi	Wigan Athletic	Free transfer	
15 July 2015	MF	(Portugal)	Lisandro Semedo	Sporting CP	Undisclosed	
22 July 2015	FW	(England)	Rowan Liburd	Billericay Town	Undisclosed	
12 August 2015	MF	(Peru)	Paolo Hurtado	Paços de Ferreira	Undisclosed	
4 January 2016	MF	(Bosnia and Herzegovina)	Seid Behram	Željezničar	Undisclosed	
19 January 2016	MF	(England)	George Evans	Manchester City	Undisclosed	
20 January 2016	FW	(France)	Yann Kermorgant	Bournemouth	Undisclosed	
28 January 2016	FW	(Latvia)	Deniss Rakels	KS Cracovia	Undisclosed	

=== Loans in ===
Start date	Position	Nationality	Name	From	End date	Ref.
5 August 2015	DF	(England)	Andrew Taylor	Wigan Athletic	End of season	
18 August 2015	MF	(Spain)	Álex	Espanyol	End of season	
31 August 2015	FW	(Brazil)	Lucas Piazon	Chelsea	28 April 2016	
1 September 2015	DF	(Jamaica)	Michael Hector	Chelsea	28 April 2016	
1 September 2015	FW	(Czech Republic)	Matěj Vydra	Watford	End of season	
1 September 2015	MF	(Netherlands)	Ola John	Benfica	End of season	

=== Out ===
Date	Position	Nationality	Name	To	Fee	Ref.
6 July 2015	DF	(England)	Jordi Osei-Tutu	Arsenal	Undisclosed	
11 August 2015	MF	(Nigeria)	Hope Akpan	Blackburn Rovers	Free	
27 August 2015	FW	(Russia)	Pavel Pogrebnyak	Dynamo Moscow	Undisclosed	
31 August 2015	DF	(Georgia (country))	Lasha Dvali	MSV Duisburg	Free	
1 September 2015	DF	(Jamaica)	Michael Hector	Chelsea	Undisclosed	
6 January 2016	FW	(England)	Nick Blackman	Derby County	Undisclosed	
25 January 2016	MF	(Wales)	Jake Taylor	Exeter City	Undisclosed	
26 January 2016	FW	(Portugal)	Orlando Sá	Maccabi Tel Aviv	Undisclosed	

=== Loans out ===
Start date	Position	Nationality	Name	To	End date	Ref.
5 August 2015	FW	(England)	Craig Tanner	Plymouth Argyle	end of season	
7 August 2015	GK	(England)	George Legg	Chesham United	12 December 2015	
11 August 2015	MF	(Wales)	Jake Taylor	Motherwell	End of Season	
20 August 2015	DF	(England)	Robert Dickie	Cheltenham Town	End of January 2016	
1 September 2015	MF	(England)	Aaron Kuhl	Dundee United	14 December 2016	
11 September 2015	FW	(Scotland)	Harry Cardwell	Woking	12 October 2015	
9 October 2015	FW	(Republic of Ireland)	Simon Cox	Bristol City	4 January 2016	
16 October 2015	DF	(Republic of Ireland)	Sean Long	Luton Town	5 January 2016	
11 November 2015	MF	(England)	Tarique Fosu	Fleetwood Town	2 January 2016	
13 November 2015	FW	(England)	Dominic Samuel	Gillingham	End of season	
23 November 2015	MF	(England)	Jack Stacey	Barnet	26 December 2015	
26 November 2015	FW	(United States)	Andrija Novakovich	Cheltenham Town	2 January 2016	
26 November 2015	DF	(Scotland)	Dominic Hyam	Basingstoke Town	2 January 2016	
24 December 2015	GK	(England)	George Legg	Hampton & Richmond Borough	20 February 2016	
28 January 2016	MF	(Peru)	Paolo Hurtado	Vitória	end of season	
1 February 2016	DF	(Scotland)	Dominic Hyam	Dagenham & Redbridge	5 March 2016	
2 February 2016	FW	(Estonia)	Bogdan Vaštšuk	Farnborough		
12 February 2016	MF	(Republic of Ireland)	Liam Kelly	Bath City	12 April 2016	
12 February 2016	MF	(Scotland)	Jake Sheppard	Eastbourne Borough		
27 February 2016	GK	(England)	Stuart Moore	Peterborough United	28 March 2016	
4 March 2016	FW	(England)	Rowan Liburd	Wycombe Wanderers	4 April 2016	
15 March 2016	DF	(Republic of Ireland)	Sean Long	Braintree Town	End of season	
23 March 2016	DF	(England)	Robert Dickie	Cheltenham Town	End of season	
24 March 2016	MF	(England)	Jack Stacey	Carlisle United	3 May 2016	
24 March 2016	MF	(England)	Tarique Fosu	Accrington Stanley	End of season	
24 March 2016	GK	(England)	Lewis Ward	Sutton United	End of season	
24 March 2016	MF	(England)	Hammed Lawal	Bishop's Stortford	End of season	
24 March 2016	FW	(Scotland)	Harry Cardwell	Braintree Town	End of season	
5 May 2016	GK	(England)	Lewis Ward	Fylkir	26 June 2016	

=== Released ===
Date	Position	Nationality	Name	Joined	Date	Ref
30 June 2016	DF	(England)	Anton Ferdinand	Southend United	27 August 2016	
30 June 2016	DF	(England)	Nana Owusu	Basingstoke Town	27 September 2016	
30 June 2016	DF	(Republic of Ireland)	Pierce Sweeney	Exeter City	28 July 2016	
30 June 2016	MF	(Afghanistan)	Noor Husin	Crystal Palace	August 2016	
25 May 2016	MF	(Bosnia and Herzegovina)	Seid Behram	Racing Union Luxembourg		
30 June 2016	MF	(England)	Hammad Lawal	Vestri	3 March 2017	
30 June 2016	MF	(Iceland)	Samúel Friðjónsson	Vålerenga	1 July 2016	
30 June 2016	MF	(Republic of Ireland)	Conor Shaughnessy	Leeds United	1 September 2016	
30 June 2016	MF	(Northern Ireland)	Lewis Collins	Mansfield Town	4 October 2016	
30 June 2016	MF	(Wales)	Hal Robson-Kanu	West Bromwich Albion	31 August 2016	
30 June 2016	FW	(Estonia)	Bogdan Vaštšuk	Riga	24 August 2016	
30 June 2016	FW	(Republic of Ireland)	Simon Cox	Southend United	16 July 2016	

=== Trial ===
Date from	Position	Nationality	Name	Last club	Date to	Ref.
2 July 2015	GK	(Oman)	Ali Al-Habsi	Wigan Athletic	14 July 2015	
20 July 2015	FW	(Tunisia)	Ahmed Akaïchi	ES Tunis	26 July 2015	
July 2015	FW	(Oman)	Sultan Al Harthy	Arsenal Soccer School Oman		
9 November 2015	MF	(United States)	Dillon Powers	Colorado Rapids	30 November 2015	
10 November 2015	DF	(Republic of Ireland)	Kevin Foley	Copenhagen	22 November 2015	
18 January 2016	MF	(Spain)	Javier Matilla	Real Betis		
7 March 2016	MF	(Poland)	Aleksander Jagiełło	Dolcan Ząbki		
2 May 2016	MF	(Germany)	Anil Capkın	1. FC Köln II		

== Squad ==
As of match played 7 May 2016

No.	Name	Nationality	Position	Date of birth (Age (Note: Age as of the end of the season))	Signed from	Signed in	Contract ends	Apps.	Goals
Goalkeepers
1	Jonathan Bond	(England)	GK	19 May 1993 (aged 22)	Watford	2015	2018	14	0
26	Ali Al-Habsi	(Oman)	GK	30 December 1981 (aged 34)	Wigan Athletic	2015	2017	40	0
40	Stuart Moore	(England)	GK	8 September 1994 (aged 21)	Academy	2013		0	0
	George Legg	(England)	GK	30 April 1996 (aged 20)	Academy	2015	2016	0	0
	Lewis Ward	(England)	GK	5 March 1997 (aged 19)	Academy	2015		0	0
Defenders
2	Chris Gunter	(Wales)	RB	21 July 1989 (aged 26)	Nottingham Forest	2012	2018	166	2
5	Paul McShane	(Republic of Ireland)	DF	6 January 1986 (aged 30)	Hull City	2015	2018	40	1
11	Jordan Obita	(England) (Note: Obita was born in Oxford, England, but qualified to represent Uganda and made his international debut for Uganda in June 2025.)	DF	8 December 1993 (aged 22)	Academy	2010	2018	119	1
15	Anton Ferdinand	(England)	CB	18 February 1985 (aged 31)	Antalyaspor	2014	2016	26	0
24	Pierce Sweeney	(Republic of Ireland)	CB	11 September 1994 (aged 21)	Bray Wanderers	2012		0	0
32	Sean Long	(Republic of Ireland)	RB	2 April 1995 (aged 21)	Academy	2013	2016	1	0
33	Shane Griffin	(Republic of Ireland)	LB	8 September 1994 (aged 21)	Academy	2013	2016	0	0
34	Niall Keown	(Republic of Ireland) (Note: Keown was born in Oxford, England, but also qualified to represent Republic of Ireland and Northern Ireland through his grandparents. Keown made his debut for Republic of Ireland U21 in 2016.)	RB	5 April 1995 (aged 21)	Academy	2013	2018	2	0
35	Jake Cooper	(England)	CB	3 February 1995 (aged 21)	Academy	2013	2018	49	4
43	Tennai Watson	(England)	DF	4 March 1997 (aged 19)	Academy	2015	2018	0	0
45	Dominic Hyam	(Scotland)	DF	20 December 1995 (aged 20)	Academy	2014	2016	0	0
46	Robert Dickie	(England)	DF	3 March 1996 (aged 20)	Academy	2014		1	0
	Nana Owusu	(England)	DF	27 February 1996 (aged 20)	Academy	2014	2016	0	0
	Zak Jules	(Scotland)	DF	2 July 1997 (aged 18)	Academy	2015		0	0
Midfielders
4	George Evans	(England)	CM	13 December 1994 (aged 21)	Manchester City	2016	2019	6	0
6	Oliver Norwood (Note: Norwood was born in Burnley, England, and represented England at U-16 and U-17 level, but also qualified to represent Northern Ireland. Norwood made his international debut for the Northern Irish U-19 side in 2010 before representing going to further represent Northern Ireland at U-21 and B level before making his full international debut for Northern Ireland on 11 August 2010.)	(Northern Ireland)	CM	12 April 1991 (aged 25)	Huddersfield Town	2014	2017	92	4
9	Hal Robson-Kanu (Note: Robson-Kanu was born in Ealing, England, and represented England at U-19 and U-20 level, but also qualified to represent Wales through his grandmother and made his international debut for the Welsh U-21 side in May 2010 before making his full international debut for Wales five days later.)	(Wales)	LW	21 May 1989 (aged 26)	Academy	2007	2016	227	30
12	Garath McCleary (Note: McCleary was born in Oxford, England, but qualified to represent Jamaica and made his international debut for Jamaica in February 2013.)	(Jamaica)	RW	15 May 1987 (aged 28)	Nottingham Forest	2012	2017	148	17
16	Paolo Hurtado	(Peru)	MF	27 July 1990 (aged 25)	Paços de Ferreira	2015	2018	6	0
18	Aaron Tshibola	(England) (Note: Tshibola was born in Beckton, England, but qualified to represent Democratic Republic of the Congo and made his international debut for DR Congo in March 2018.)	CM	2 January 1995 (aged 21)	Academy	2013	2019	17	0
21	Stephen Quinn	(Republic of Ireland)	MF	1 April 1986 (aged 30)	Hull City	2015	2018	33	1
23	Danny Williams (Note: Williams was born in Karlsruhe, Germany, and represented Germany at U-15 level. Williams also qualified to play for the United States through his parents, and made his debut for them in October 2011.)	(United States)	CM	8 March 1989 (aged 27)	Hoffenheim	2013	2017	109	10
28	Aaron Kuhl	(England)	MF	30 January 1996 (aged 20)	Academy	2014	2016	8	0
37	Jack Stacey	(England)	MF	6 April 1996 (aged 20)	Academy	2014	2019	6	0
38	Liam Kelly	(Republic of Ireland)	MF	22 November 1995 (aged 20)	Academy	2014	2016	0	0
39	Tarique Fosu	(England)	MF	5 November 1995 (aged 20)	Academy	2014	2017	1	0
49	Josh Barrett	(Republic of Ireland)	MF	21 June 1998 (aged 17)	Academy	2015		3	0
	Conor Shaughnessy	(Republic of Ireland)	MF	30 June 1996 (aged 19)	Academy	2014		0	0
	Samúel Friðjónsson	(Iceland)	MF	22 February 1996 (aged 20)	Academy	2013	2016	0	0
	Lewis Collins	(England)	MF	16 October 1996 (aged 19)	Academy	2015	2016	0	0
	Jake Sheppard	(Scotland)	MF	30 May 1997 (aged 18)	Academy	2015	2017	0	0
	Noor Husin	(Afghanistan)	MF	3 March 1997 (aged 19)	Academy	2015		0	0
	Lisandro Semedo	(Portugal)	MF	12 March 1996 (aged 20)	Sporting CP	2015	2018	0	0
Forwards
10	Deniss Rakels	(Latvia)	FW	20 August 1992 (aged 23)	KS Cracovia	2016	2018	14	3
27	Craig Tanner	(England)	FW	27 October 1994 (aged 21)	Academy	2013	2017	5	1
29	Yann Kermorgant	(France)	FW	8 November 1981 (aged 34)	Bournemouth	2016	2017	17	3
30	Dominic Samuel	(England)	FW	1 April 1994 (aged 22)	Academy	2012	2018	4	0
31	Simon Cox (Note: Cox was born in Reading, England, but qualified to represent Republic of Ireland internationally through his grandmother and made his international debut for Republic of Ireland on 24 May 2011.)	(Republic of Ireland)	FW	28 April 1987 (aged 29)	Nottingham Forest	2014	2016	68	9
36	Andrija Novakovich	(United States)	FW	21 September 1996 (aged 19)	University School of Milwaukee	2014		2	0
41	Rowan Liburd	(England)	FW	28 August 1992 (aged 23)	Billericay Town	2015	2017	3	0
	Bogdan Vaštšuk	(Estonia)	FW	4 October 1995 (aged 20)	Dynamo Moscow	2013		0	0
	Harry Cardwell	(Scotland)	FW	23 October 1996 (aged 19)	Academy	2014		0	0

=== Left club during season ===
Note: Flags indicate national team as defined under FIFA eligibility rules; some limited exceptions apply. Players may hold more than one non-FIFA nationality.

No.	Pos.	Nation	Player
3	DF	ENG	Andrew Taylor (returned to Wigan Athletic after loan)
7	FW	RUS	Pavel Pogrebnyak (to Dynamo Moscow)
7	FW	CZE	Matěj Vydra (returned to Watford after loan)
8	DF	JAM	Michael Hector (loan return to Chelsea)
10	FW	POR	Orlando Sá (to Maccabi Tel Aviv)
16	MF	NGA	Hope Akpan (to Blackburn Rovers)

No.	Pos.	Nation	Player
17	FW	BRA	Lucas Piazon (loan return to Chelsea)
19	MF	ESP	Álex (returned to Espanyol after loan)
20	MF	NED	Ola John (returned to Benfica after loan)
22	FW	ENG	Nick Blackman (to Derby County)
25	MF	WAL	Jake Taylor (to Exeter City)

== Friendlies ==
4 July 2015 Friendly	Reading XI	1–0	Maidenhead United	Arborfield
BST	Novakovich	Report		Stadium: Hogwood Park; Referee: Dermot Gallagher

8 July 2015 Friendly	Thai Premier League XI	2–2	Reading	Bangkok, Thailand
19:00 ICT	Prempak 45'; Inpinit 56'	Report	Blackman 35'; Pogrebnyak 78'	Stadium: National Stadium; Referee: Suprem Nonthawong

14 July 2015 Friendly	Beaconsfield SYCOB	0–7	Reading U21	Beaconsfield
19:45 BST (UTC+1)		Report	Tanner D.Hyam; S.Friðjónsson; Liburd; Trialist	Stadium: Holloways Park

18 July 2015 Friendly	Tottenham Hotspur	1–0	Reading	Enfield
BST (UTC+1)	Eriksen 60'	Report		Stadium: Tottenham Hotspur Training Ground; Attendance: 0

18 July 2015 Friendly	Basingstoke Town	3–2	Reading U21	Basingstoke
15:00 BST (UTC+1)	L.Enver-Marum; G.Hallahan	Report	N.Husin (o.g.)	Stadium: The Camrose

21 July 2015 Friendly	Hungerford Town	1–1	Reading U21	Hungerford
19:45 BST (UTC+1)				Stadium: Bulpit Lane

21 July 2015 Friendly	Bristol Rovers	0–2	Reading	Horfield
19:45 BST (UTC+1)		Report	Samuel 41'; Blackman 62'	Stadium: Memorial Stadium; Attendance: 1,880; Referee: Kevin Johnson

24 July 2015 Friendly	Reading	1–1	Swansea City	High Wycombe
19:45 BST (UTC+1)	Blackman 46'	Report	Bartley 48'	Stadium: Adams Park; Attendance: 1,284; Referee: Iain Williamson

25 July 2015 Friendly	Plymouth Argyle	2–1	Reading U21	Plymouth
15:00 BST (UTC+1)	Carey 52'; Reid 87'	Report	Semedo 79'	Stadium: Home Park; Attendance: 1,485; Referee: Lee Swabey

27 July 2015 Friendly	Crawley Town	1–0	Reading	Crawley
19:45 BST (UTC+1)	Henderson 78'	Report		Stadium: Broadfield Stadium; Attendance: 1,288; Referee: Gavin Ward

29 July 2015 Friendly	Bournemouth	v	Reading U21
14:00 BST (UTC+1)				Attendance: Behind Closed Doors

1 August 2015 Friendly	Reading	0–0	Espanyol	Reading
15:00 BST		Report		Stadium: Madejski Stadium; Attendance: 6,329; Referee: Keith Stroud

1 August 2015 Friendly	Maidenhead United	0–0	Reading U21	Maidenhead
15:00 BST (UTC+1)				Stadium: York Road

9 October 2015 Friendly	West Ham United	3–4	Reading	Upton Park
BST (UTC+1)	Zárate; Carroll	Report	Piazon; Blackman (pen.); Tshibola (o.g.)	Stadium: Boleyn Ground

20 December 2015 Friendly	Reading U21	4–2	Queens Park Rangers U21	Arborfield
GMT (UTC)	Hurtado; H. Cardwell; Tshibola (pen.); Stacey	Report	Furlong; Mackie	Stadium: Hogwood Park

28 January 2016 Friendly	Queens Park Rangers U21	2–3	Reading U21	Harlington
GMT (UTC)	A.Komodikis; N'Guessan	Report	H. Cardwell; Novakovich; Fosu	Stadium: Harlington Falls

== Competitions ==
=== Championship ===
==== League table ====
Pos	Team	Pld	W	D	L	GF	GA	GD	Pts
15	Blackburn Rovers	46	13	16	17	46	46	0	55
16	Nottingham Forest	46	13	16	17	43	47	−4	55
17	Reading	46	13	13	20	52	59	−7	52
18	Bristol City	46	13	13	20	54	71	−17	52
19	Huddersfield Town	46	13	12	21	59	70	−11	51

Source: BBC Sport
Rules for classification: 1) Points; 2) Goal difference; 3) Number of goals scored

==== Results summary ====
Overall								Home						Away					
Pld	W	D	L	GF	GA	GD	Pts	W	D	L	GF	GA	GD	W	D	L	GF	GA	GD
46	13	13	20	49	56	−7	52	8	9	6	22	17	+5	5	4	14	27	39	−12

Last updated: 7 May 2016.
Source: Reading FC

==== Results by matchday ====
Round	1	2	3	4	5	6	7	8	9	10	11	12	13	14	15	16	17	18	19	20	21	22	23	24	25	26	27	28	29	30	31	32	33	34	35	36	37	38	39	40	41	42	43	44	45	46
Ground	A	H	A	H	A	H	H	A	A	H	H	A	A	H	H	A	H	A	H	A	A	H	A	H	H	A	A	H	A	H	A	H	A	H	A	A	H	A	H	H	A	A	H	A	H	A
Result	L	D	D	D	W	W	L	W	W	W	W	D	L	D	D	L	W	L	L	L	L	W	L	L	W	D	L	D	L	D	D	W	W	D	L	L	D	W	W	L	L	L	L	D	L	L
Position	19	19	18	19	13	9	11	6	3	3	2	3	7	7	7	8	7	8	11	11	13	11	11	12	12	12	14	13	16	15	15	14	12	11	14	15	17	13	13	14	14	14	15	15	15	17

Updated to match(es) played on 7 May 2016. Source: BBC Sport
A = Away; H = Home; W = Win; D = Draw; L = Loss

==== Matches ====
8 August 2015 1	Birmingham City	2–1	Reading	Birmingham
15:00 BST (UTC+1)	Kieftenbeld (yellow card) 39'; Cotterill 40'; Toral 47'; Davis (yellow card) 90+4'; Kuszczak (yellow card) 90+7'; Donaldson (yellow card) 90+8'	BBC Report; Reading Report	Tshibola (yellow card) 17'; Norwood (yellow card) 49'; Blackman 58'; Obita (yellow card) 61'; Cox (yellow card) 90'; Hector (yellow card) 90+3'	Stadium: St Andrew's; Attendance: 19,171; Referee: Peter Bankes

16 August 2015 2	Reading	0–0	Leeds United	Reading
15:00 BST (UTC+1)	Norwood (yellow card) 82'	BBC Report; Reading Report	Bamba (yellow card) 2'; Murphy (yellow card) 75'; Adeyemi (yellow card) 90+2'	Stadium: Madejski Stadium; Attendance: 21,581; Referee: Chris Kavanagh

19 August 2015 3	Sheffield Wednesday	1–1	Reading	Sheffield
19:45 BST (UTC+1)	Matias (yellow card) 32'; Hutchinson (yellow card) 65'; Sougou 90'	BBC Report; Reading Report	Tshibola (yellow card) 26'; Williams 49'; Hector (yellow card) 90+2'	Stadium: Hillsborough Stadium; Attendance: 20,247; Referee: Paul Tierney

22 August 2015 4	Reading	0–0	Milton Keynes Dons	Reading
15:00 BST (UTC+1)	Tshibola (yellow card) 56'	BBC Report; Reading Report	Poyet (yellow card) 64'; McFadzean (yellow card) 68'; Baker (yellow card) 90+3'	Stadium: Madejski Stadium; Attendance: 16,547; Referee: David Coote

29 August 2015 5	Brentford	1–3	Reading	Brentford
15:00 BST (UTC+1)	Tarkowski (yellow card) 31'; McCormack (yellow card) 53'; Hofmann (yellow card) 57'; Vibe 67'; Bidwell (yellow card) 84'; Button (yellow card) 90+8'	BBC Report; Reading Report	Sá 17'; Obita (yellow card) 22'; Blackman 32', 90+9' (pen.); Gunter (yellow card) 87'; Bond (yellow card) 90+6'	Stadium: Griffin Park; Attendance: 10,206; Referee: Andy Madley

11 September 2015 6	Reading	5–1	Ipswich Town	Reading
20:00 BST (UTC+1)	Sá 7', 14', 63'; Blackman 49'; Norwood 87'	BBC Report; Reading Report	Sears 11'; Chambers (yellow card) 32'; Skuse (yellow card) 36'; Fraser (yellow card) 40'; Knudsen (yellow card) 90+2'	Stadium: Madejski Stadium; Attendance: 16,809; Referee: Roger East

15 September 2015 7	Reading	0–1	Derby County	Reading
20:00 BST (UTC+1)	Tshibola (yellow card) 24'; Sá (red card) 45+3'; Norwood (yellow card) 90'	BBC Report; Reading Report	Shackell (yellow card) 45+3'; Johnson (yellow card) 62'; Ince 69'	Stadium: Madejski Stadium; Attendance: 15,697; Referee: Andy Davies

19 September 2015 8	Bristol City	0–2	Reading	Bristol
15:00 BST (UTC+1)	Flint (yellow card) 27'; Pack (yellow card) 57'	BBC Report; Reading Report	Blackman 9'; McCleary 13'; Norwood (yellow card) 52'	Stadium: Ashton Gate Stadium; Attendance: 15,385; Referee: Steve Martin

26 September 2015 9	Burnley	1–2	Reading	Burnley
15:00 BST (UTC+1)	Keane (yellow card) 52'; Darikwa 67'	BBC Report; Reading Report	Blackman 5'; Piazon 9'; Gunter (yellow card) 88'; Williams (yellow card) 90+4'	Stadium: Turf Moor; Attendance: 15,226; Referee: Tony Harrington

3 October 2015 10	Reading	2–0	Middlesbrough	Reading
15:00 BST (UTC+1)	Williams 1'; Obita (yellow card) 38'; Blackman 88' (pen.)	BBC Report; Reading Report	Amorebieta (yellow card) 27'; Leadbitter (yellow card) 66'	Stadium: Madejski Stadium; Attendance: 19,516; Referee: Keith Stroud

17 October 2015 11	Reading	1–0	Charlton Athletic	Reading
15:00 BST (UTC+1)	Blackman 76'	BBC Report; Reading Report	Guðmundsson (yellow card) 10'; Bauer (yellow card) 51' (yellow-red card) 68'; Bergdich (yellow card) 66'	Stadium: Madejski Stadium; Attendance: 17,614; Referee: Robert Lewis

20 October 2015 12	Rotherham United	1–1	Reading	Rotherham
19:45 BST (UTC+1)	Collins 48', (yellow card) 58'; Toffolo (yellow card) 72'	BBC Report; Reading Report	Blackman 26'; Taylor (yellow card) 69'	Stadium: New York Stadium; Attendance: 9,071; Referee: Jeremy Simpson

24 October 2015 13	Fulham	4–2	Reading	Fulham
13:30 BST (UTC+1)	McCormack 50'; Dembélé 54', 74'; Kačaniklić 56'; Fredericks (yellow card) 76'; Christensen (yellow card) 86'	BBC Report; Reading Report	Piazon 13'; Obita (yellow card) 30'; Gunter (yellow card) 39'; Sá 49'; Blackman (yellow card) 90'	Stadium: Craven Cottage; Attendance: 18,618; Referee: Fred Graham

31 October 2015 14	Reading	1–1	Brighton & Hove Albion	Reading
15:00 GMT (UTC)	Vydra 78'	Report; Reading Report	Murphy 51'	Stadium: Madejski Stadium; Attendance: 21,244; Referee: Neil Swarbrick

3 November 2015 15	Reading	2–2	Huddersfield Town	Reading
20:00 GMT (UTC)	Norwood 15'; Blackman (yellow card) 77'; John 84'	BBC Report; Reading Report	Paterson 2'; Wells 26'; Dempsey (yellow card) 67'; Lynch (yellow card) 77'; Bunn (yellow card) 77'	Stadium: Madejski Stadium; Attendance: 14,379; Referee: Brendan Malone

7 November 2015 16	Cardiff City	2–0	Reading	Cardiff
15:00 GMT (UTC)	Noone (yellow card) 36'; Jones 44'; Connolly 53'; Peltier (yellow card) 75'; Morrison (yellow card) 88'	BBC Report; Reading Report	Williams (yellow card) 90+5'	Stadium: Cardiff City Stadium; Attendance: 15,414; Referee: Keith Stroud

21 November 2015 17	Reading	2–1	Bolton Wanderers	Reading
15:00 GMT (UTC)	McShane (yellow card) 6'; Piazon 28'; Williams 34'	BBC Report; Reading Report	Wheater (yellow card) 59'; Feeney 80' (pen.)	Stadium: Madejski Stadium; Attendance: 16,420; Referee: James Linington

28 November 2015 18	Nottingham Forest	3–1	Reading	Nottingham
15:00 GMT (UTC)	O'Grady 20'; Oliveira 31', 49'; Hobbs (yellow card) 42' (yellow-red card) 66'; Vaughan (yellow card) 90+6'	Report; Reading Report	Vydra 14'; Hector (yellow card) 54'; Williams (yellow card) 86'; John (yellow card) 89'	Stadium: City Ground; Attendance: 18,128; Referee: Keith Hill

3 December 2015 19	Reading	0–1	Queens Park Rangers	Reading
20:00 GMT (UTC)	Norwood (yellow card) 68'	BBC Report; Reading Report	Fer (yellow card) 29'; Hall (yellow card) 41'; Onuoha 90'	Stadium: Madejski Stadium; Attendance: 16,365; Referee: Andy Madley

12 December 2015 20	Preston North End	1–0	Reading	Preston
15:00 GMT (UTC)	Garner 52' (pen.)	BBC Report	McCleary (yellow card) 39'; McShane (yellow card) 69'; Vydra 82'	Stadium: Deepdale; Attendance: 10,649; Referee: Geoff Eltringham

16 December 2015 21	Hull City	2–1	Reading	Kingston upon Hull
19:45 GMT (UTC)	Livermore (yellow card) 45+1' (goal) 90'; Hernández 62'	BBC Report	Blackman 29'; Bond (yellow card) 70'	Stadium: KC Stadium; Attendance: 15,139; Referee: Oliver Langford

20 December 2015 22	Reading	1–0	Blackburn Rovers	Reading
15:00 GMT (UTC)	Williams 11'; Robson-Kanu (yellow card) 86'	BBC Report	Akpan (yellow card) 15'; Duffy (yellow card) 16'; Henley (yellow card) 82'; Hanley (yellow card) 88'	Stadium: Madejski Stadium; Attendance: 16,529; Referee: Peter Bankes

26 December 2015 23	Wolverhampton Wanderers	1–0	Reading	Wolverhampton
15:00 GMT (UTC)	Henry 18'; Edwards (yellow card) 45+2'; Iorfa (yellow card) 63'	BBC Report	McCleary (yellow card) 17'	Stadium: Molineux; Attendance: 21,147; Referee: Simon Hooper

28 December 2015 24	Reading	1–2	Brentford	Reading
15:00 GMT (UTC)	Hector (yellow card) 12' (yellow-red card) 87'; McCleary 58'; Williams (yellow card) 75'	BBC Report	Tarkowski (yellow card) 5'; Woods 17'; Diagouraga (yellow card) 28'; Canós 72'; Button (yellow card) 80'; Dean (yellow card) 87'	Stadium: Madejski Stadium; Attendance: 20,563; Referee: Keith Stroud

2 January 2016 25	Reading	1–0	Bristol City	Reading
15:00 GMT (UTC)	Quinn (yellow card) 66'; Ferdinand (yellow card) 71'; Norwood (yellow card) 88'; Blackman 90+1'	BBC report		Stadium: Madejski Stadium; Attendance: 19,677; Referee: Darren Handley

12 January 2016 26	Derby County	1–1	Reading	Derby
19:45 GMT (UTC)	Shackell 11'; Martin (yellow card) 66'; Hendrick (yellow card) 75'; Christie (yellow card) 85'	BBC Report	Williams 38'; Gunter (yellow card) 66'; Robson-Kanu (yellow card) 84'	Stadium: iPro Stadium; Attendance: 28,175; Referee: David Coote

16 January 2016 27	Milton Keynes Dons	1–0	Reading	Milton Keynes
15:00 GMT (UTC)	Carruthers (yellow card) 63'; McFadzean (yellow card) 67'; Walsh 78'	BBC Report	Gunter (yellow card) 25'; Robson-Kanu (yellow card) 37'; Williams (yellow card) 84'	Stadium: Stadium mk Attendance: 13,062; Referee: Charles Breakspear

23 January 2016 28	Reading	1–1	Sheffield Wednesday	Reading
15:00 GMT (UTC)	Cooper 74'	BBC Report	Hooper 10'; Hunt (yellow card) 29'; Lee (yellow card) 64'	Stadium: Madejski Stadium; Attendance: 18,972; Referee: Steve Martin

2 February 2016 29	Ipswich Town	2–1	Reading	Ipswich
19:45 GMT (UTC)	Fraser 57'; Berra (yellow card) 65'; Pitman 89'	BBC Report	Obita (yellow card) 19'; Norwood (yellow card) 45+4'; McCleary 69' (pen.)	Stadium: Portman Road; Attendance: 16,616; Referee: Tim Robinson

6 February 2016 30	Reading	0–0	Wolverhampton Wanderers	Reading
15:00 GMT (UTC)	McShane (yellow card) 84'	BBC Report	Coady (yellow card) 20'; Saville (yellow card) 70'	Stadium: Madejski Stadium; Attendance: 17,771; Referee: Tony Harrington

13 February 2016 31	Reading	0–0	Burnley	Reading
15:00 GMT (UTC)	Robson-Kanu (yellow card) 59'; Obita (yellow card) 70'	BBC Report	Barton (yellow card) 67'	Stadium: Madejski Stadium; Attendance: 16,773; Referee: James Adcock

20 February 2016 32	Middlesbrough	Postponed	Reading	Middlesbrough
15:00 GMT (UTC)				Stadium: Riverside Stadium

23 February 2016 33	Reading	1–0	Rotherham United	Reading
20:00 GMT (UTC)	Hector (yellow card) 63'; Robson-Kanu 66'	BBC Report	Ward (yellow card) 22'; Clarke-Harris (yellow card) 24'; Halford (yellow card) 38'; Smallwood (yellow card) 41'; Wood (yellow card) 45'	Stadium: Madejski Stadium; Attendance: 13,504; Referee: Kevin Johnson

27 February 2016 34	Charlton Athletic	3–4	Reading	Charlton
15:00 GMT (UTC)	Sanogo 6', 49', 84'; Guðmundsson (yellow card) 82'	BBC Report	Kermorgant 4', 35'; John 42'; Williams (yellow card) 75'; Rakels 90+2'	Stadium: The Valley; Referee: Nigel Miller

5 March 2016 35	Reading	2–2	Fulham	Reading
15:00 GMT (UTC)	Robson-Kanu 24' (pen.), 41'	BBC Report	Dembélé 8'; Fredericks (yellow card) 21'; McCormack 52' (pen.) (yellow card) 64'; Tunnicliffe (yellow card) 72'; Richards (yellow card) 90'	Stadium: Madejski Stadium; Attendance: 17,859; Referee: Simon Hooper

8 March 2016 36	Huddersfield Town	3–1	Reading	Huddersfield
19:45 GMT (UTC)	Wells 51'; Paterson 61'; Husband (yellow card) 77'; Bojaj 87'	BBC Report	Piazon (yellow card) 30'; Taylor (yellow card) 89'; John 90+3'	Stadium: John Smith's Stadium; Attendance: 10,167; Referee: Paul Tierney

15 March 2016 37	Brighton & Hove Albion	1–0	Reading	Falmer
19:45 GMT (UTC)	Wilson 25'; Stephens (yellow card) 67'	BBC Report	Gunter (yellow card) 88'	Stadium: Falmer Stadium; Attendance: 23,418; Referee: Steve Martin

19 March 2016 38	Reading	1–1	Cardiff City	Reading
15:00 GMT (UTC)	McCleary 37'; John (yellow card) 45+2'	BBC Report	Connolly (yellow card) 63'; Immers 65'; Pilkington (yellow card) 83'	Stadium: Madejski Stadium; Attendance: 17,407; Referee: Darren Drysdale

2 April 2016 39	Bolton Wanderers	0–1	Reading	Bolton
15:00 BST (UTC+1)	Holding (red card) 22'; Pratley (yellow card) 85'	BBC Report	Kermorgant (yellow card) 27'; Gunter (yellow card) 40'; Quinn (yellow card) 74'; John 90' (yellow card) 90+1'	Stadium: Macron Stadium; Attendance: 13,469; Referee: Geoff Eltringham

5 April 2016 40	Reading	2–1	Nottingham Forest	Reading
20:00 BST (UTC+1)	Vydra 68'; Norwood 81'	BBC Report	Gardner (yellow card) 32'; Osborn 41'	Stadium: Madejski Stadium; Attendance: 15,678; Referee: Dean Whitestone

9 April 2016 41	Reading	0–2	Birmingham City	Reading
15:00 BST (UTC+1)	Kermorgant (yellow card) 42'; Cooper (yellow card) 57'; McShane (yellow card) 84'	BBC Report	Donaldson 2' (yellow card) 83'; Shotton 27'; Morrison (yellow card) 90+5'	Stadium: Madejski Stadium; Attendance: 17,868; Referee: Nigel Miller

12 April 2016 32	Middlesbrough	2–1	Reading	Middlesbrough
19:45 BST (UTC+1)	Nsue 10'; Forshaw 90+4'	BBC Report	Cox 54'; Cooper (yellow card) 57'; Taylor (yellow card) 71'	Stadium: Riverside Stadium; Attendance: 23,746; Referee: Scott Duncan

16 April 2016 42	Leeds United	3–2	Reading	Leeds
15:00 BST	Diagouraga 48'; Antenucci (yellow card) 65'; Wood 69', 85'; Cooper (yellow card) 89'	BBC Report	Evans (yellow card) 35'; Hector 39'; McCleary (yellow card) 65'; Norwood (yellow card) 79'; Rakels 81'	Stadium: Elland Road; Attendance: 20,881; Referee: Jeremy Simpson

19 April 2016 43	Reading	1–2	Hull City	Reading
20:00 BST (UTC+1)	Cooper 4'	BBC Report	Hernández 18'; Robertson 79'; Hayden (yellow card) 87'	Stadium: Madejski Stadium; Attendance: 12,949; Referee: Fred Graham

23 April 2016 44	Queens Park Rangers	1–1	Reading	Shepherd's Bush
15:00 BST (UTC+1)	Hall 35'	BBC Report	Norwood (yellow card) 25'; Rakels 41'	Stadium: Loftus Road; Attendance: 16,225; Referee: Keith Hill

30 April 2016 45	Reading	1–2	Preston North End	Reading
15:00 BST (UTC+1)	Quinn 86'	BBC Report	Beckford 56'; Johnson 90+1'	Stadium: Madejski Stadium; Attendance: 15,834; Referee: Darren Deadman

7 May 2015 46	Blackburn Rovers	3–1	Reading	Blackburn
12:30 BST (UTC+1)	Bennett 8'; Graham 14'; Jackson 86'	BBC Report	Kermorgant 31'	Stadium: Ewood Park; Attendance: 13,140; Referee: Andy Madley

=== League Cup ===
11 August 2015 First round	Colchester United	0–1 (a.e.t.)	Reading	Colchester
19:45 BST (UTC+1)	Briggs (yellow card) 76'	BBC Report; Reading Report	Robson-Kanu (yellow card) 38'; Taylor (yellow card) 90+2'; Gunter 115'	Stadium: Colchester Community Stadium; Attendance: 2,706; Referee: Darren Drysdale

25 August 2015 Second round	Portsmouth	1–2	Reading	Milton
19:45 BST (UTC+1)	Chaplin 40'	BBC Report; Reading Report	Robson-Kanu (yellow card) 45+2'; Blackman 64'; Norwood (yellow card) 74'; McCleary 84'	Stadium: Fratton Park; Attendance: 18,190; Referee: Gavin Ward

22 September 2015 Third round	Reading	1–2	Everton	Reading
20:00 BST (UTC+1)	Blackman 36'; Hurtado (yellow card) 50'; Piazon (yellow card) 61'; Hector (yellow card) 72'	BBC Report; Reading Report	Barkley 62'; Deulofeu 73'	Stadium: Madejski Stadium; Attendance: 19,435; Referee: Keith Hill

=== FA Cup ===
9 January 2016 Third Round	Huddersfield Town	2–2	Reading	Huddersfield
15:00 GMT (UTC)	Hogg (yellow card) 45+4'; Paterson 57'; Wells (yellow card) 68' (goal) 90+2' (pen.)	BBC [ Reading F.C.]	McCleary (yellow card) 45+1'; Vydra 71'; Robson-Kanu 87'	Stadium: John Smith's Stadium; Attendance: 9,236; Referee: Jeremy Simpson

19 January 2016 Third Round Reply	Reading	5–2	Huddersfield Town	Reading
20:00 GMT (UTC)	Piazon 29'; Vydra 57', 61', 90'; Álex 90+3'	BBC [ Reading F.C.]	Paterson 8'; Smith 15'; Hogg (red card) 27'	Stadium: Madejski Stadium; Attendance: 8,119; Referee: Oliver Langford

30 January 2016 Fourth round	Reading	4–0	Walsall	Reading
15:00 GMT (UTC)	Robson-Kanu 37'; Vydra 40', 89'; Ferdinand (yellow card) 58'; Williams 75'	BBC [ Reading F.C.]	Demetriou (yellow card) 35'; Chambers (yellow card) 59'	Stadium: Madejski Stadium; Attendance: 13,367; Referee: Peter Bankes

20 February 2016 Fifth round	Reading	3–1	West Bromwich Albion	Reading
15:00 GMT (UTC)	McShane 59'; Hector 72'; Piazon 90+4'	BBC [ Reading F.C.]	Fletcher 54'; Evans (yellow card) 87'	Stadium: Madejski Stadium; Attendance: 19,566; Referee: Anthony Taylor

11 March 2016 Quarter-final	Reading	0–2	Crystal Palace	Reading
19:55 GMT (UTC)	Hector (yellow card) 30'; Gunter (yellow card) 58'; Cooper (yellow card) 68' (yellow-red card) 85'	BBC [ Reading F.C.]	Zaha (yellow card) 58'; Bolasie (yellow card) 62'; Cabaye 86' (pen.); Jedinak (yellow card) 89'; Campbell 90+4'	Stadium: Madejski Stadium; Attendance: 23,110; Referee: Mike Dean

== Squad statistics ==
As of match played 7 May 2016

=== Appearances and goals ===
No.	Pos	Nat	Player	Total		Championship		FA Cup		League Cup	
No.	Pos	Nat	Player	Apps	Goals	Apps	Goals	Apps	Goals	Apps	Goals
1	GK	(England) ENG	Jonathan Bond	14	0	14	0	0	0	0	0
2	DF	(Wales) WAL	Chris Gunter	52	1	43+1	0	5	0	3	1
4	MF	(England) ENG	George Evans	6	0	5+1	0	0	0	0	0
5	DF	(Republic of Ireland) IRL	Paul McShane	40	1	35	0	2+1	1	1+1	0
6	MF	(Northern Ireland) NIR	Oliver Norwood	50	3	43	3	5	0	2	0
9	MF	(Wales) WAL	Hal Robson-Kanu	35	5	21+7	3	5	2	2	0
10	FW	(Latvia) LVA	Deniss Rakels	14	3	5+7	3	1+1	0	0	0
11	DF	(England) ENG	Jordan Obita	31	0	25+2	0	3	0	1	0
12	MF	(Jamaica) JAM	Garath McCleary	38	5	20+14	4	2	0	0+2	1
15	DF	(England) ENG	Anton Ferdinand	24	0	18+1	0	3	0	2	0
18	MF	(England) ENG	Aaron Tshibola	16	0	6+6	0	1	0	1+2	0
21	MF	(Republic of Ireland) IRL	Stephen Quinn	33	1	27	1	4	0	2	0
23	MF	(United States) USA	Danny Williams	46	6	35+4	5	3+1	1	2+1	0
26	GK	(Oman) OMA	Ali Al-Habsi	40	0	32	0	5	0	3	0
29	FW	(France) FRA	Yann Kermorgant	17	3	15+2	3	0	0	0	0
30	FW	(England) ENG	Dominic Samuel	2	0	0+1	0	0	0	0+1	0
31	FW	(Republic of Ireland) IRL	Simon Cox	17	1	6+7	1	2	0	1+1	0
35	DF	(England) ENG	Jake Cooper	30	2	21+3	2	5	0	1	0
41	FW	(England) ENG	Rowan Liburd	3	0	0+3	0	0	0	0	0
46	DF	(England) ENG	Robert Dickie	1	0	0+1	0	0	0	0	0
49	MF	(Republic of Ireland) IRL	Josh Barrett	3	0	1+2	0	0	0	0	0
Players away from the club on loan:
16	MF	(Peru) PER	Paolo Hurtado	6	0	0+5	0	0	0	1	0
Players who appeared for Reading but left during the season:
3	DF	(England) ENG	Andrew Taylor	23	0	17+2	0	2	0	2	0
7	FW	(Czech Republic) CZE	Matěj Vydra	36	9	24+7	3	3+2	6	0	0
8	DF	(Jamaica) JAM	Michael Hector	36	2	26+4	1	2+2	1	2	0
10	FW	(Portugal) POR	Orlando Sá	21	5	16+3	5	0+1	0	1	0
17	FW	(Brazil) BRA	Lucas Piazon	26	5	18+4	3	1+2	2	1	0
19	MF	(Spain) ESP	Álex	10	1	2+6	0	0+1	1	1	0
20	MF	(Netherlands) NED	Ola John	33	4	8+20	4	1+3	0	1	0
22	FW	(England) ENG	Nick Blackman	28	13	22+3	11	0	0	3	2

=== Goal scorers ===
As of match played 7 May 2016

Place	Position	Nation	Number	Name	Championship	FA Cup	League Cup	Total
1	FW	(England)	22	Nick Blackman	11	0	2	13
2	FW	(Czech Republic)	7	Matěj Vydra	3	6	0	9
3	MF	(United States)	23	Danny Williams	5	1	0	6
4	FW	(Portugal)	10	Orlando Sá	5	0	0	5
4	MF	(Jamaica)	12	Garath McCleary	4	0	1	5
4	FW	(Brazil)	17	Lucas Piazon	3	2	0	5
4	MF	(Wales)	9	Hal Robson-Kanu	3	2	0	5
8	MF	(Netherlands)	20	Ola John	4	0	0	4
9	MF	(Northern Ireland)	6	Oliver Norwood	3	0	0	3
9	FW	(Latvia)	10	Deniss Rakels	3	0	0	3
9	FW	(France)	29	Yann Kermorgant	3	0	0	3
12	DF	(England)	35	Jake Cooper	2	0	0	2
12	DF	(Jamaica)	8	Michael Hector	1	1	0	2
14	FW	(Republic of Ireland)	31	Simon Cox	1	0	0	1
14	MF	(Republic of Ireland)	21	Stephen Quinn	1	0	0	1
14	MF	(Spain)	19	Álex	0	1	0	1
14	DF	(Republic of Ireland)	5	Paul McShane	0	1	0	1
14	DF	(Wales)	2	Chris Gunter	0	0	1	1
Total					52	14	4	70

=== Clean sheets ===
Place	Position	Nation	Number	Name	Championship	FA Cup	League Cup	Total
1	GK	(Oman)	26	Ali Al-Habsi	7	1	1	9
2	GK	(England)	1	Jonathan Bond	4	0	0	4
TOTALS					11	1	1	13

=== Disciplinary record ===
As of match played 7 May 2016

Position	Nation	Number	Name	Championship		FA Cup		League Cup		Total	
Position	Nation	Number	Name	Booked	Sent off (straight red)	Booked	Sent off (straight red)	Booked	Sent off (straight red)	Booked	Sent off (straight red)
1	(England)	GK	Jonathan Bond	2	0	0	0	0	0	2	0
2	(Wales)	DF	Chris Gunter	7	0	1	0	0	0	8	0
3	(England)	DF	Andrew Taylor	3	0	0	0	1	0	4	0
4	(England)	MF	George Evans	1	0	0	0	0	0	1	0
5	(England)	DF	Paul McShane	4	0	0	0	1	0	5	0
6	(Northern Ireland)	MF	Oliver Norwood	9	0	0	0	1	0	10	0
7	(Czech Republic)	FW	Matej Vydra	1	0	0	0	0	0	1	0
8	(Jamaica)	DF	Michael Hector	6	1	1	0	1	0	8	1
9	(Wales)	MF	Hal Robson-Kanu	4	0	0	0	2	0	6	0
10	(Portugal)	FW	Orlando Sá	0	1	0	0	0	0	0	1
11	(England)	MF	Jordan Obita	6	0	0	0	0	0	6	0
12	(Jamaica)	MF	Garath McCleary	3	0	1	0	0	0	4	0
15	(England)	DF	Anton Ferdinand	1	0	1	0	0	0	2	0
16	(Peru)	MF	Paolo Hurtado	0	0	0	0	1	0	1	0
17	(Brazil)	FW	Lucas Piazon	1	0	0	0	1	0	2	0
18	(England)	MF	Aaron Tshibola	4	0	0	0	0	0	4	0
20	(Netherlands)	MF	Ola John	3	0	0	0	0	0	3	0
21	(Republic of Ireland)	MF	Stephen Quinn	3	0	0	0	0	0	3	0
22	(England)	FW	Nick Blackman	2	0	0	0	0	0	2	0
23	(United States)	MF	Danny Williams	6	0	0	0	0	0	6	0
29	(France)	FW	Yann Kermorgant	2	0	0	0	0	0	2	0
31	(Republic of Ireland)	FW	Simon Cox	1	0	0	0	0	0	1	0
35	(England)	DF	Jake Cooper	2	0	2	1	0	0	4	1
Total				71	2	6	1	7	0	84	3

== Awards ==
=== Manager of the Month ===
Month	Name	Award
September	Steve Clarke	Nominated

=== Player of the Month ===
Month	Name	Award
September	Nick Blackman	Nominated
