= Jonathan Bond =

English footballer (born 1993)

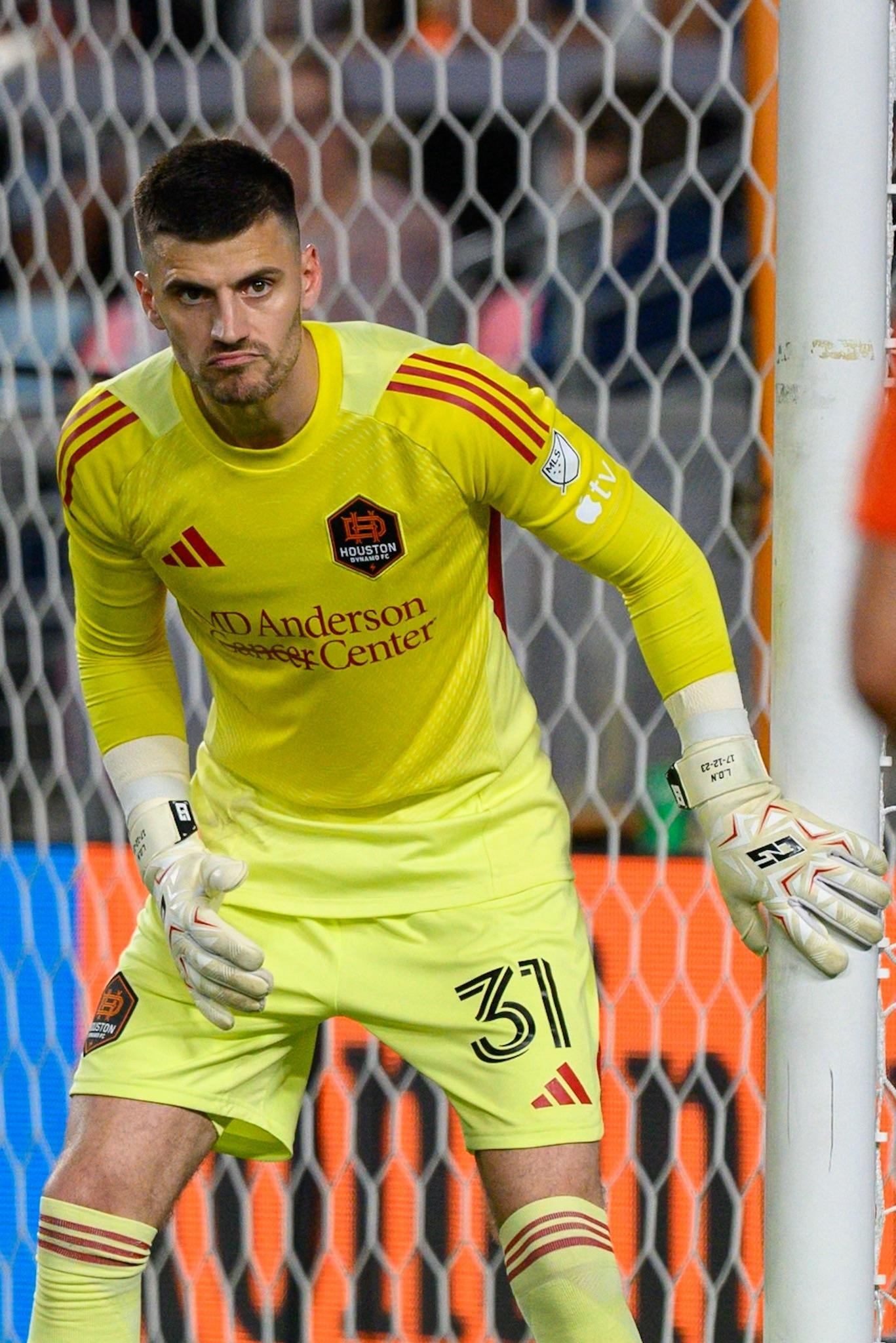
- Bond with the Houston Dynamo in 2025

Personal information
- Full name: Jonathan Henry Bond
- Date of birth: 19 May 1993 (age 33)
- Place of birth: Hemel Hempstead, England
- Height: 6 ft 5 in (1.96 m)
- Position: Goalkeeper

Team information
- Current team: Houston Dynamo
- Number: 31

Youth career
- 2010–2011: Watford

Senior career*
Years	Team	Apps	(Gls)
2010–2015	Watford	22	(0)
2011	→ Brackley Town (loan)	7	(0)
2011	→ Brackley Town (loan)	8	(0)
2011	→ Forest Green Rovers (loan)	4	(0)
2012	→ Dagenham & Redbridge (loan)	5	(0)
2012	→ Bury (loan)	6	(0)
2015–2018	Reading	14	(0)
2016–2017	→ Gillingham (loan)	7	(0)
2017–2018	→ Peterborough United (loan)	37	(0)
2018–2021	West Bromwich Albion	0	(0)
2021–2024	LA Galaxy	91	(0)
2024–2025	Watford	9	(0)
2025–	Houston Dynamo	68	(0)

International career
2009	Wales U17	6	(1)
2010–2011	Wales U19	8	(0)
2014	England U20	2	(0)
2013–2015	England U21	5	(0)
- * Club domestic league appearances and goals as of 12:56, 21 August 2026 (UTC)

Jonathan Henry Bond (born 19 May 1993) is an English professional footballer who plays as a goalkeeper for Major League Soccer club Houston Dynamo.

Born in England, Bond played internationally for Wales at under-17 and under-19 levels, before changing his international allegiance in 2013, later playing for England at under-20 and under-21 levels.

== Club career ==
=== Watford ===
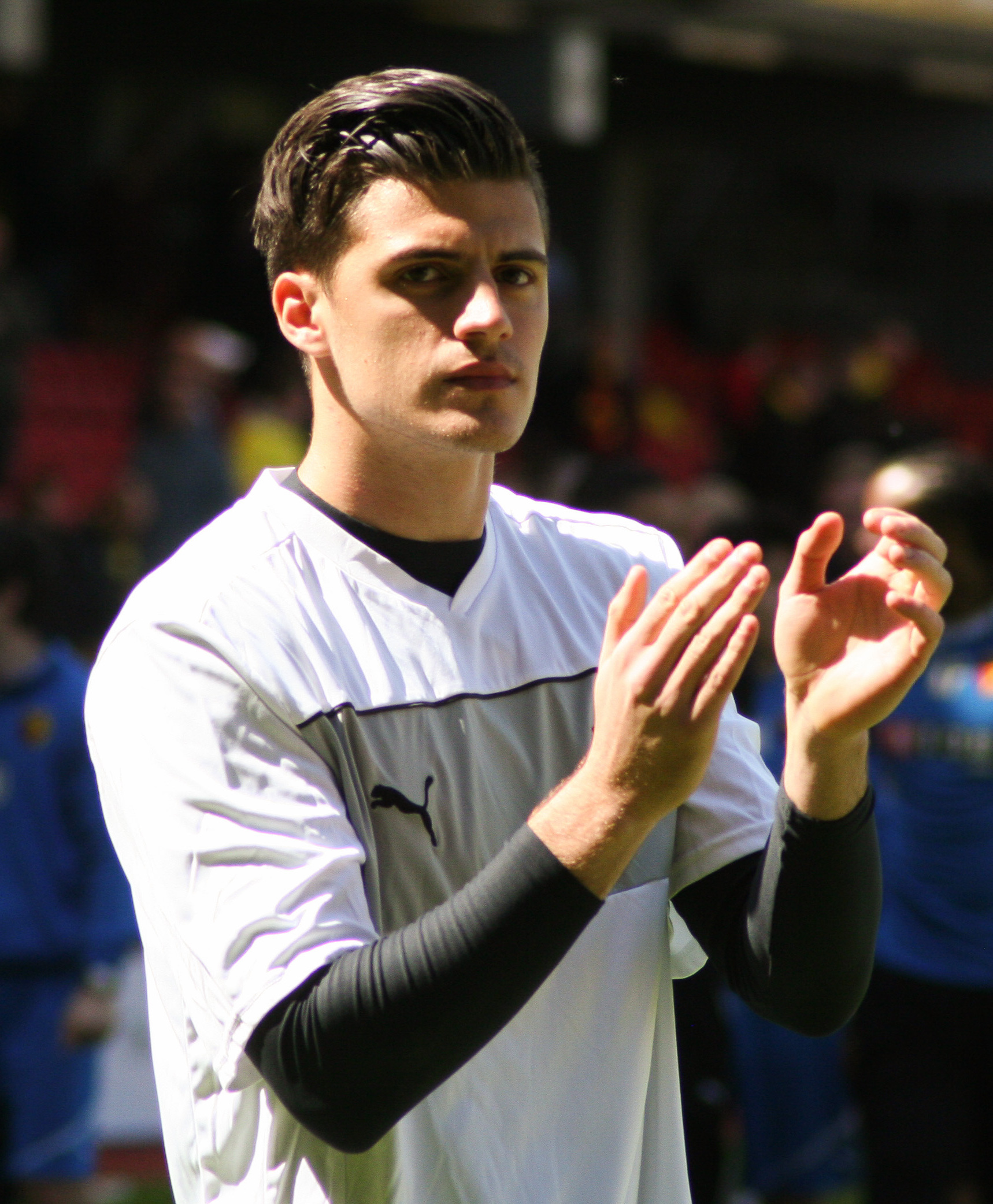
Bond with Watford in 2014.

Bond came through the academy system at Watford featuring in the youth and reserve teams at Vicarage Road. During the 2010–11 season Bond featured on the substitutes bench for Watford several times as cover for the injured Rene Gilmartin and also spent time on loan at Brackley Town.

In August 2011, Bond again joined Brackley Town on loan to receive some playing experience. On his return to Watford, Bond was again sent out on loan to Conference National side Forest Green Rovers on 4 November 2011 for a month. Bond made his Forest Green debut the next day in a 4–1 win against Alfreton Town. In total Bond made four appearances for Forest Green in his loan spell and was recalled a week early by Watford.

On his return to Watford, Bond acted as deputy goalkeeper to Scott Loach on the substitutes bench in the Championship and on 2 January 2012 made his first team debut replacing Loach who had been sent off in a 2–0 loss against Portsmouth at Fratton Park.

On 23 February 2012, Bond joined League Two side Dagenham & Redbridge on a monthlong loan deal. He then joined Bury on loan until the end of the season and made his debut in the 3–0 defeat at Brentford on 7 April.

After starting Watford's FA Cup defeat to Manchester City on 5 January 2013, Bond made his home league debut in a 2–1 win over Derby County on 23 February 2013 after coming on for the injured Manuel Almunia. Bond made his first league start against Wolverhampton Wanderers on 1 March 2013. He then continued to deputise with starts against Sheffield Wednesday on 5 March 2013, Blackpool on 9 March 2013, Barnsley on 16 March 2013 and once more versus Burnley on 29 March 2013 – all in place of the injured Almunia. With Almunia not back to fitness, Bond made his sixth consecutive start on 2 April 2013 against Hull City in a 1–0 win, keeping his first clean sheet in a man of the match performance.

Bond deputised in the final league game of the season against Leeds United on 4 May 2013 after Almunia was injured in the warm-up. Bond then suffered a serious injury of his own after a horrible collision with Ikechi Anya and Dominic Poleon which forced him off on a stretcher.

=== Reading ===
On Saturday 4 July 2015, Bond signed for Reading on a three-year deal from Watford for an undisclosed fee.

==== Loan spells ====
On 26 August 2016, Bond joined Gillingham on loan until 7 January 2017.

On 26 June 2017 Bond joined Peterborough United on a six-month loan, extending the loan until the end of the season on 3 January 2018.

=== West Bromwich Albion ===
On 16 July 2018, Bond joined newly relegated West Bromwich Albion on a two-year contract as a free agent. Bond served as back-up to first-choice keeper Sam Johnstone as the club lost in the 2018-19 EFL Championship play-offs in the semi-finals to rivals Aston Villa. However, they bounced back the following year to finish as runners-up in the 2019-20 EFL Championship, gaining promotion back to the Premier League. Bond was released from the club after his contract ended on 1 August 2020. Albion re-signed Bond on a one-year deal before the start of the 2020–21 Premier League season.

=== LA Galaxy ===
On 14 January 2021, Bond moved to the United States to sign with Major League Soccer side LA Galaxy.

In February 2024, LA Galaxy announced that Bond had departed the club having had his contract terminated by mutual consent.

=== Return to Watford ===
On 3 July 2024, Bond returned to Championship club Watford on a one-year deal with the option for a further twelve months.

=== Houston Dynamo ===
In April 2025, Bond was sold to MLS side Houston Dynamo for an undisclosed fee.

== International career ==
Bond has made international appearances for Wales at under-17 level, and scored an 88th minute equalising goal in Wales' 2–1 Uefa Under-17 Championship qualifying match against Russia in October 2009. He later progressed to under-19 level, and has been called up to under-21 squads. In 2010, aged 17, Bond was called up to the full Wales squad for two Euro 2012 qualifying matches, although he did not play in the games.

In spite of his caps for Wales, the FAW stated on 19 July 2013 that Bond had chosen to transfer to the English national pool and was called into the English under-21 squad in August 2013. He made his debut for the England under-21s on 19 November, replacing Jack Butland at half-time in a 9–0 win against San Marino.

== Career statistics ==
As of match played 1 February 2025

Appearances and goals by club, season and competition
Club	Season	League			National cup		League cup		Other		Total	
Club	Season	Division	Apps	Goals	Apps	Goals	Apps	Goals	Apps	Goals	Apps	Goals
Watford	2009–10	Championship	0	0	0	0	0	0	—		0	0
Watford	2010–11	Championship	0	0	0	0	0	0	—		0	0
Watford	2011–12	Championship	1	0	1	0	0	0	—		2	0
Watford	2012–13	Championship	8	0	1	0	1	0	0	0	10	0
Watford	2013–14	Championship	10	0	2	0	3	0	—		15	0
Watford	2014–15	Championship	3	0	1	0	2	0	—		6	0
Watford	Total		22	0	5	0	6	0	0	0	33	0
Forest Green Rovers (loan)	2011–12	Conference Premier	4	0	0	0	0	0	—		4	0
Dagenham & Redbridge (loan)	2011–12	League Two	5	0	0	0	0	0	—		5	0
Bury (loan)	2011–12	League One	6	0	0	0	0	0	—		6	0
Reading	2015–16	Championship	14	0	0	0	0	0	—		14	0
Reading	2016–17	Championship	0	0	0	0	0	0	0	0	0	0
Reading	Total		14	0	0	0	0	0	0	0	14	0
Gillingham (loan)	2016–17	League One	7	0	0	0	1	0	—		8	0
Peterborough United (loan)	2017–18	League One	37	0	4	0	1	0	3	0	45	0
West Bromwich Albion	2018–19	Championship	0	0	3	0	0	0	0	0	3	0
West Bromwich Albion	2019–20	Championship	0	0	3	0	1	0	—		4	0
West Bromwich Albion	2020–21	Premier League	0	0	0	0	0	0	—		0	0
West Bromwich Albion	Total		0	0	6	0	1	0	0	0	7	0
LA Galaxy	2021	MLS	31	0	—		—		—		31	0
LA Galaxy	2022	MLS	34	0	0	0	—		2	0	36	0
LA Galaxy	2023	MLS	24	0	1	0	—		0	0	25	0
LA Galaxy	Total		89	0	1	0	—		2	0	92	0
Watford	2024–25	Championship	9	0	1	0	3	0	0	0	13	0
Career total			193	0	15	0	12	0	5	0	227	0

== Personal life ==
Bond attended Berkhamsted School and would play football alongside YouTuber KSI at break times. His mother is an American from Seattle, which allowed him to hold an American passport.
