= Ellen Louise Clacy =

English artist

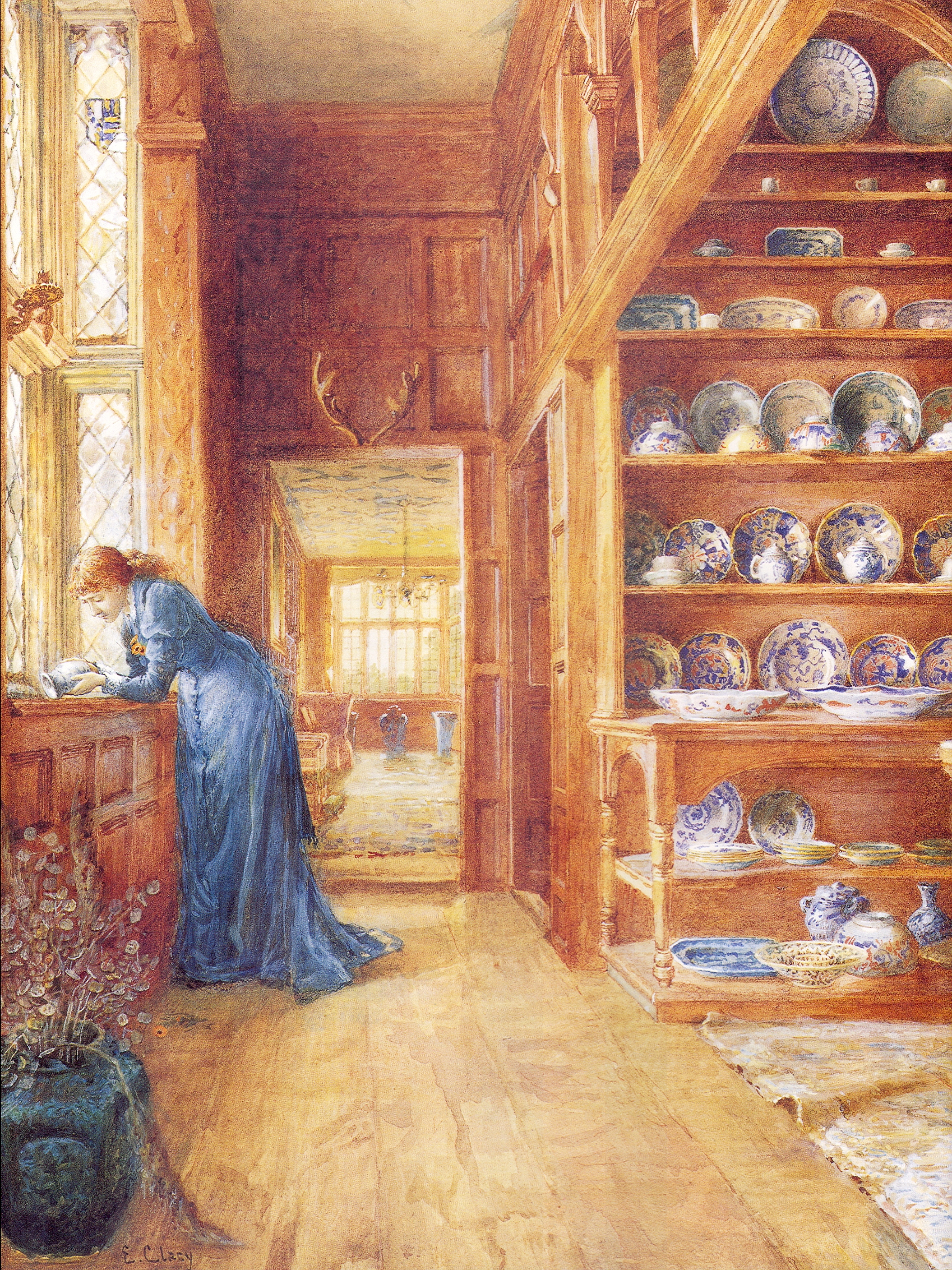
- Painting "Lady Betty Germains China Closet" by Ellen Louise Clacy
- Born: 1853; Onboard ship from Australia to England
- Died: 1916 (aged 62–63)
- Occupation: Watercolorist
- Parents: Charles Berry Clacy (father); Ellen Clacy (mother)

Ellen Louise Clacy (1853–1916) was a British watercolorist. She participated numerous times with the Royal Academy throughout her career from 1870 to 1916, and her works include landscapes, scenes of rural life, and history painting. She was the daughter of travel writer Ellen Louise Clacy.

== Early life ==
Ellen Louise Clacy was born to the author Ellen Clacy (1830–1901) in 1853 on a boat from Australia to England. Ellen Clacy Sr. (née Sturmer) married mining engineer Charles Berry Clacy in 1854 and resided in England. Beginning in the 1850s, she wrote novels, newspaper and magazine articles, and travel writing under the pseudonym Cycla. She was best known for an account of Australian gold mines A Lady's Visit to the Gold Diggings of Australia from 1852–1853. By 1871, she was describing herself as a widow. The younger Ellen Clacy began her career as a professional artist in the 1870s.

== Career ==
Clacy exhibited works regularly with the Royal Watercolour Society and Society of British Artists. She exhibited with the Royal Academy twenty seven times from 1872 to 1900. Many of her exhibited works were the results of painting excursions during which she traveled independently in the countryside. Her painting Will Myers, Ratcatcher and Poacher, shown at the Royal Academy in 1885, was painted on a trip "up North", where Clacy used a local carpenter in his shop as her model. Clacy's works of rural and northern life have been analyzed by art historian Deborah Cherry as the responses of a metropolitan tourist to an unknown place. Her travels also influenced works shown at the Liverpool Academy: The Vagrant (exhibited in 1876 with the lines: "But of the wanderer none took thought/ And where it pleased her best she sought/ Her shelter and her bread") and Wither (exhibited in 1890); both paintings depict female travelers in the countryside.

In 1880, the Walker Art Gallery exhibited Flight, priced at £50 and called "a very charming evening landscape" by The Academy weekly review. The Old Poacher (1885) was purchased by the Walker Art Gallery in 1886 from the Liverpool Autumn Exhibition for its permanent collection. In 1886 Clacy also exhibited The Cry from the Snowdrift at the Royal Academy, which was reviewed as "a carefully-finished work" by Truth.

== Works ==
- La Girondiste (1872)
- The Missing Playfellow (1873)
- Juliet (1873)
- The Adoration. "Ave Maria! 'tis the hour of prayer." (1873)
- Vesper Song (1874)
- The List of Conspirators (1874)
- Parham Chapel (1875)
- Old and Grey (1876)
- The Organ-Loft (1877)
- The Shadow in the Home (1880)
- The Night Watch (1880)
- A Bad Day's Work (1881)
- Hands Full and Heart Full (1882)
- "Waiting For Daddy", oil painting, (1882)
- "The treasure we saved last night from the wreck of 'Helga'" (1884)
- Will Myers, Ratcatcher and Poacher (1885)
- The Cry from the Snowdrift (1886)
- The Return of the Prodigal in the Year of the Great Plague, 1665 (1887)
- "What's this dull town to me? Robin's not near." (1888)
- A Hunted Jewess, France, 1610 (1889)
- The Flagmaker (1891)
- ''The Sound in the Wind" (1892)
- The Letter (1892)
- Love's Relenting (1893)
- The Saracen maid seeking Gilbert à Beckett in London (1894)
- The White Moth (1896)
- The Sounds of the Beloved's Footsteps (1897)
- War news in the streets, England, 1900 (1900)
- The Old Poacher (1885)
- Seated Girl with a Book
- Ellen Clacy Reading
- Flight
- The Vagrant
- Wither
- Marigold's: The China Closet, Knole (1880)
- Interior at Knowle Hall
- Interior at Knowle Hall
- Waiting for the Return of the Fishing Fleet, Whitby (1883)
