= Ellen Clacy =

English writer, journalist

- Born: Ellen Von Sturmer; 1830; Richmond, Surrey, England
- Died: 1901 (aged 70–71); London, England
- Other names: Cycla, Mrs Charles Clacy
- Occupations: Author, journalist
- Known for: A Lady's Visit to the Gold Diggings of Australia in 1852–1853
- Spouse: Charles Berry Clacy
- Children: Ellen Louise Clacy
- Parents: Frederick Sturmer (father); Mary Norris (mother)

Ellen Clacy (née Von Sturmer; born Richmond, Surrey, England 1830; died London, England 1901) is best known for her book A Lady's Visit to the Gold Diggings of Australia in 1852–1853.

== Biography ==
Little biographical information is available about Clacy. What is known indicates that her life was less “proper” than it appeared in her most well-known work. Clacy Von Sturmer was one of 6 children of clergyman Frederick Sturmer and Mary Norris. In 1852, she traveled to Australia with her eldest brother to seek their fortunes in the gold fields of Victoria. Just two months after arriving in Melbourne, Clacy returned to England by ship without her brother and gave birth to her daughter Ellen Louise Clacy on board ship during the return journey.

After her return from Australia, Clacy began writing under the pseudonym "Cycla." In 1854, she married Charles Berry Clacy, a merchant's clerk and mining engineer and brother of the architect, John Berry Clacy. She described herself as a widow in 1871 and may have been abandoned by her husband, and she was said to support herself by writing articles for newspapers.

== Publications ==
- A Lady's Visit to the Gold Diggings of Australia in 1852–1853 (1853)
- Lights and Shadows of Australian Life (1854)
- Passing Clouds (1858)
- Warfare and Work: or, Life's Progress (1859)
- Aunt Dorothy's Will (1860)
