= Arborfield and Newland =

Civil parish in Berkshire, England

Coordinates: 51.406°N 0.916°W

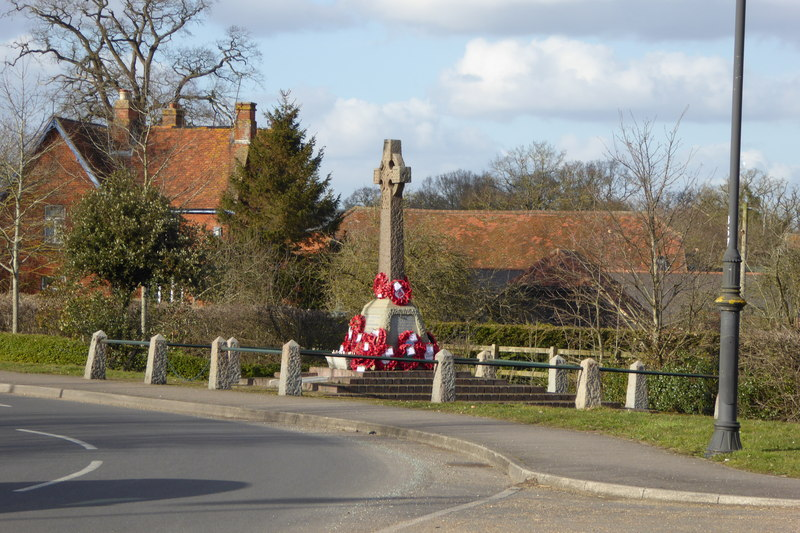
- Arborfield Cross and Newlands Farm

- Location within the United Kingdom
- Population: 3,115
- Unitary authority: Wokingham
- Ceremonial county: Berkshire
- Country: England
- Sovereign state: United Kingdom
- Website: Parish Council

Arborfield and Newland is a civil parish in the Wokingham district of Berkshire, England. It had a population of 2,228 according to the 2001 census, increasing to 3,115 at the 2011 Census. It includes Arborfield, Arborfield Cross, part of Arborfield Green, Newland and Carter's Hill.
