= International Cocoa Quarantine Centre =

Organisation aiming to reduce the amount of disease affecting cocoa plants

- Location within Berkshire Location within England Location within the United Kingdom
- Abbreviation: ICQC
- Formation: 1985; 41 years ago
- Purpose: To reduce the amount of disease affecting cocoa plants
- Headquarters: Arborfield
- Coordinates: 51°24′25.19″N 0°55′26.98″W
- Parent organization: University of Reading
- Website: Website of the International Cocoa Quarantine Centre

The International Cocoa Quarantine Centre (ICQC), located in Arborfield, a suburb of Reading, Berkshire, United Kingdom, is an organization aiming to reduce the amount of disease affecting cocoa plants. Cocoa plants are quarantined in a 1,000-square-metre (11,000 sq ft) greenhouse before being transported across the globe. Quarantining cocoa plants is considered important because over 70% of the global cocoa supply originates from West Africa, and therefore the cocoa market is susceptible to any catastrophic effects that should occur in that region.

The ICQC is part of the University of Reading. It was founded in 1985.
