= Arborfield Cross =

Village in Berkshire, England

Coordinates: 51.396873°N 0.905288°W

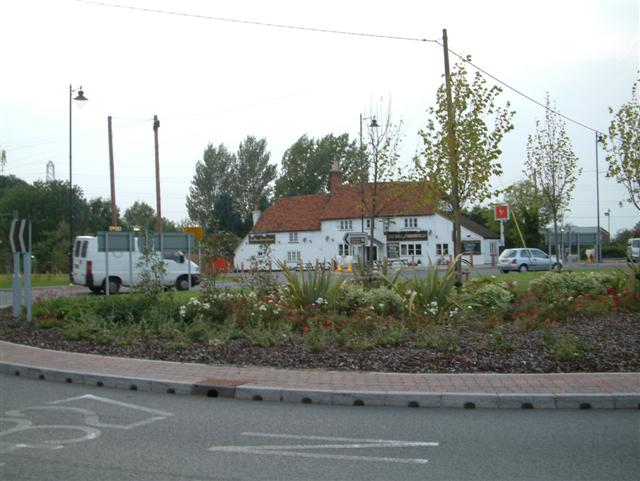
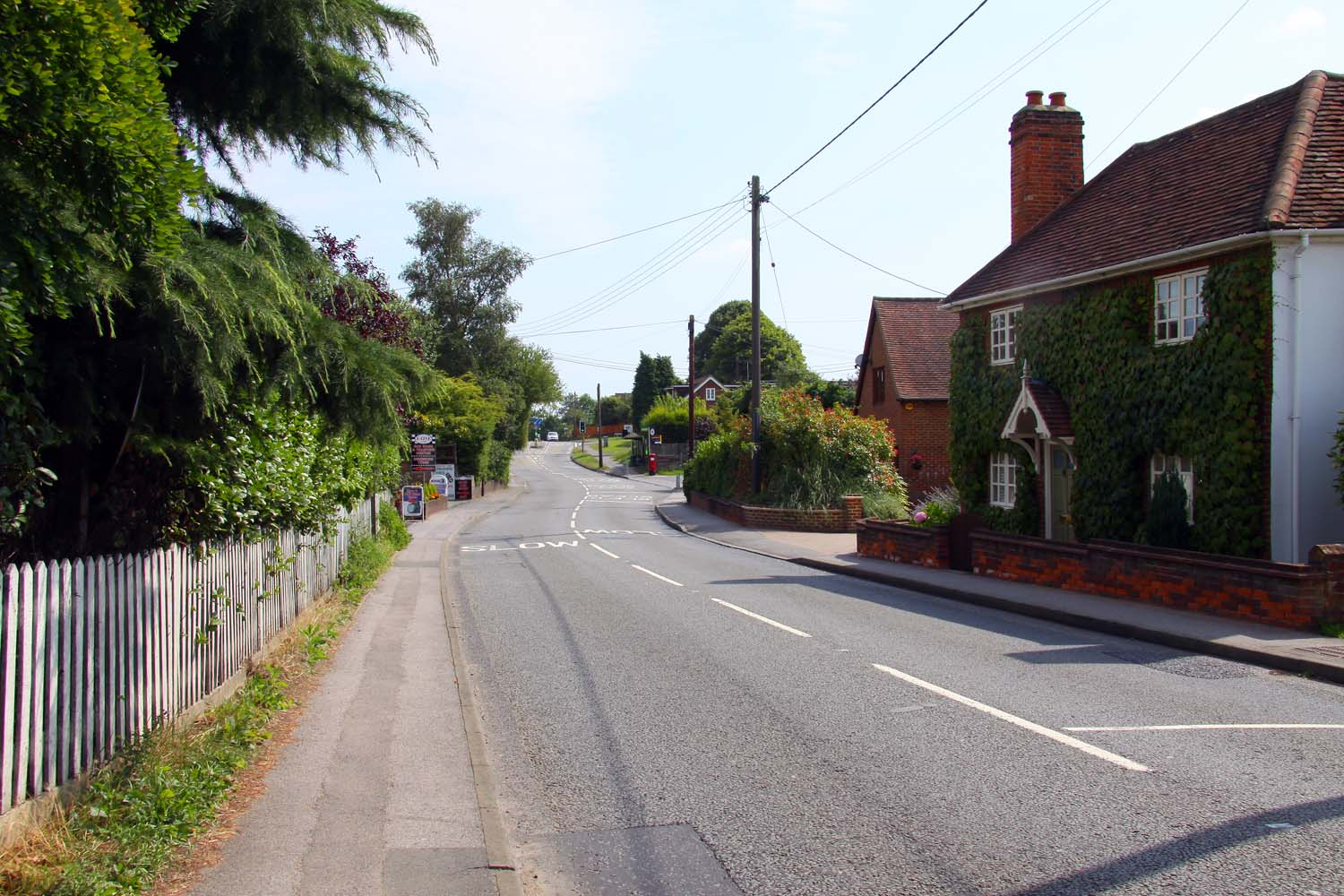
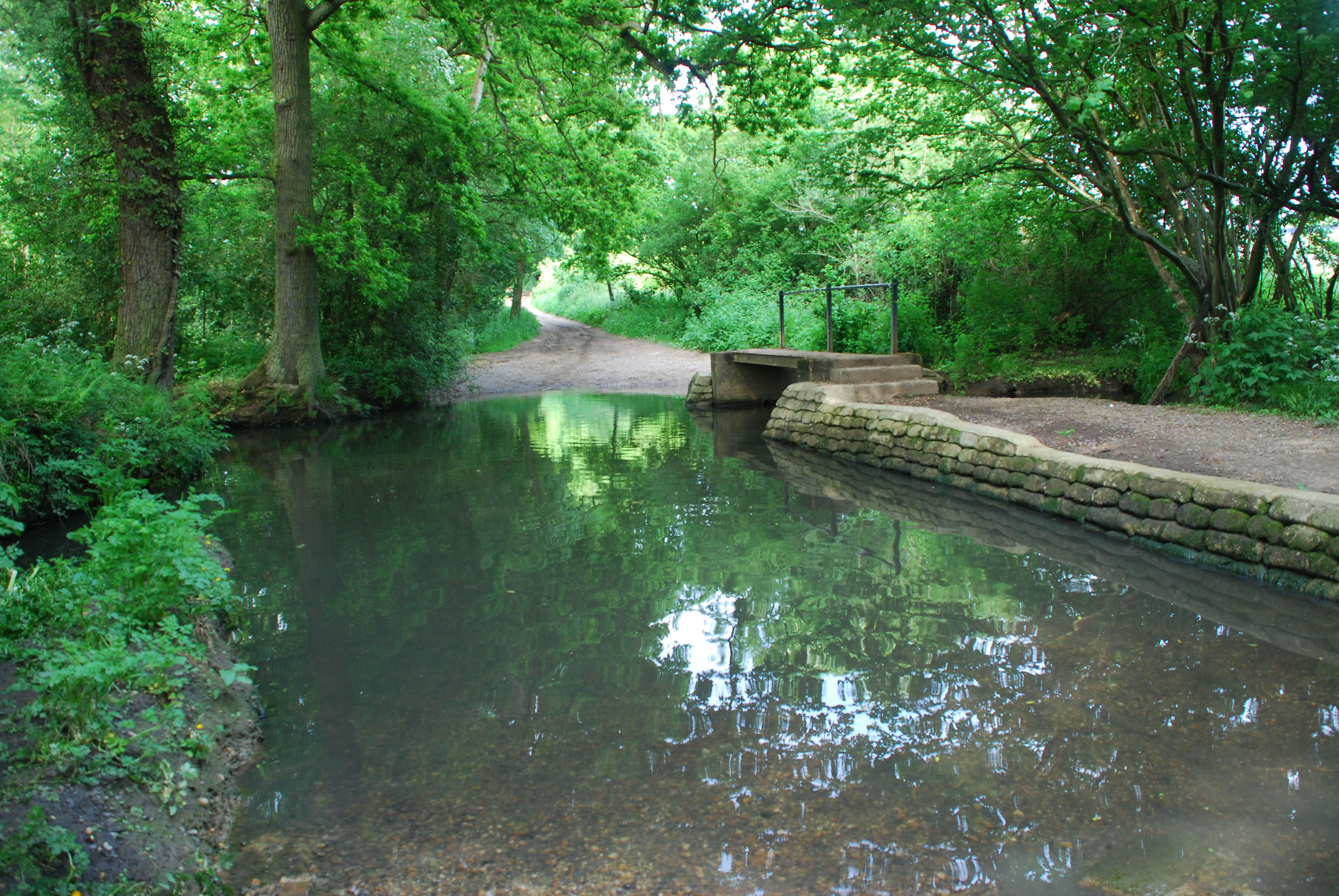
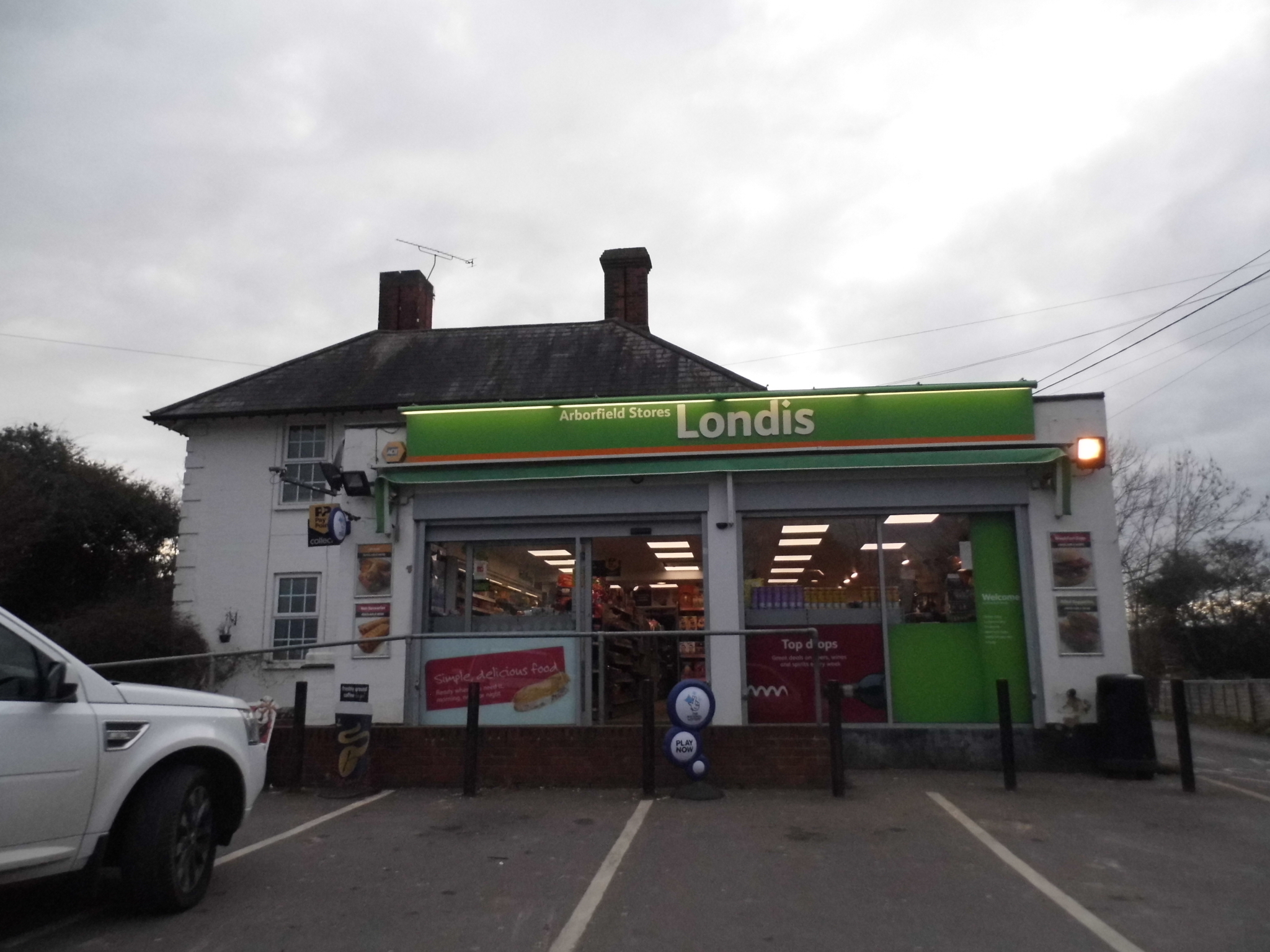
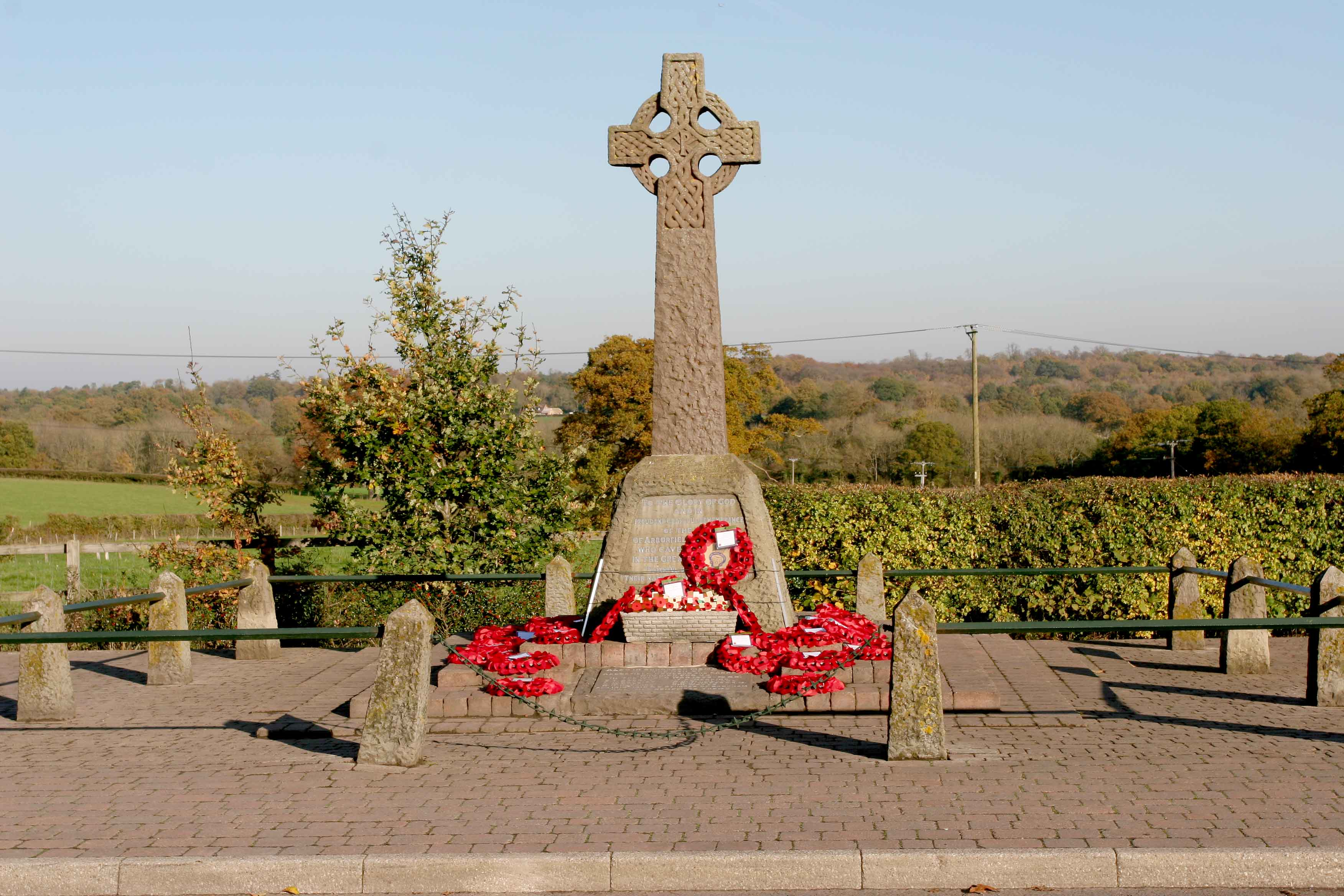
- Roundabout at Arborfield Cross Eversley Road Byway ford on the Barkham Brook Village shops on Eversley Road The war memorial

- Location within Berkshire
- Area: 0.2664 km^{2} (0.1029 sq mi)
- Population: 763 (2021 census)
  - Density: 2,864/km^{2} (7,420/sq mi)
- OS grid reference: SU761670
- Civil parish: Arborfield and Newland
- Unitary authority: Wokingham
- Ceremonial county: Berkshire
- Region: South East
- Country: England
- Sovereign state: United Kingdom
- Police: Thames Valley
- Fire: Royal Berkshire
- Ambulance: South Central

Arborfield Cross is a village in the civil parish of Arborfield and Newland in the Borough of Wokingham in the ceremonial county of Berkshire, England. In 2021 it had a population of 763.

== History ==
=== Early settlement ===
Within Arborfield Cross, archaeological excavations found evidence of human activity in the area dating back to the Late Iron Age. In 2019, excavations revealed a 1-century B.C. farmstead along with foundations for a 20-metre diameter roundhouse. The evidence suggested a self-sufficient agricultural community. Artifacts from the Roman-era suggest that the site was used throughout the early Roman period.

The modern settlement is documented to trace back to the Anglo-Saxon period. It was known as Edburgefeld, meaning Edburga's Field, which was open land on the edge of Windsor Forest. In the Domesday Book, it is noted that Arborfield belonged to the Bishop of Sonning and formed a part of the parish of Sonning. It was noted for its eel production from the fisheries. A chapel dedicated to St. Bartholomew, first mentioned in 1220, was established as the village's initial church during the medieval era. The chapel was rebuilt in 1256, replacing the wooden facade with chalk and flint, however keeping the wooden tower.Arborfield was a agrarian halmet during this period, with a population of 171 in 1377 and 29 inhabited houses. These circumstances didn't change much into the 18th century.

=== 19th century ===
Arborfield Cross became a crossroads between Arborfield, Swallowfield and Newland, facilitating trade. According to census data, the village grew to around 550 residents in 1840, linked with farming and domestic service. The village's population plateaued into early 20th century.

=== 20th century ===
Arborfield became a significant military site in the early 20th century following the establishment of the Arborfield Remount Depot in 1904. The depot supplied and trained horses for the British Army in World War I. The site closed in 1937, with the Arborfield Infirmary Stables being the only surviving structure, which has since been registered as a Scheduled monument. In 1938, the site was repurposed to open the Arborfield Garrison, which housed the Army Technical School from 1939. The Royal Observer Corps operated above-ground aircraft reporting post which was used throughout WWII. By 1940, all village events were devoted to helping the war effort. Between 1940 and 1942, the village was subject to bombings near the Bull and Arborfield Court. In 1942, the garrison became home of the Royal Electrical and Mechanical Engineers (REME). During World War II, the village was important for maintaining military vehicles and their recovery. Towards the end of the conflict, Arborfield served as a medical and accommodation hub for Allied forces, most notably aiding preparations for the D-Day landings in June 1944. Post-war, the village become a training hub for REME and the REME museum was established in 1958.

== Location ==
It is situated at what was a crossroads but is now a roundabout on the A327 road, 3 miles south-east of Reading, 3 miles west of Wokingham, and half a mile to the east of the smaller village of Arborfield. Recently, both Arborfield and Arborfield Cross have become collectively known as Arborfield, there are no signs marking the boundary of Arborfield Cross.

== Amenities ==
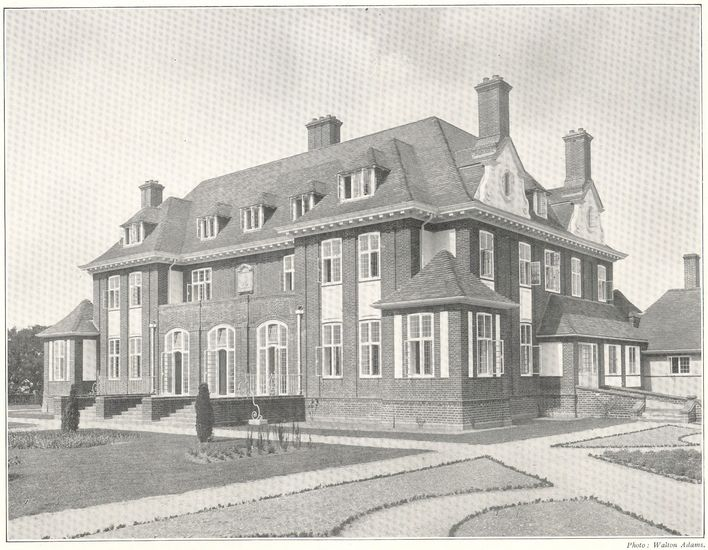
Arborfield Court

The village features a diverse range of residential architecture, ranging from beautiful 15th-century cottages through to modern housing. It includes five listed properties, including the Grade II listed Arborfield Court. The Swan Inn, formerly the local public house, closed its doors in 2019. Another prominent establishment in the village is the Grade II listed Bull Inn, located near a farm park. Additional amenities include a village store and a garage where drivers can get their cars washed. Historically, the village hosted an annual charitable music event, Rock in the Rec, held each summer on a Saturday until its discontinuation in 2010. The park is home to the Arborfield Football Club. The southern section of the village houses a Royal British Legion Club, while the Henry Street Garden Centre is located to the west. Educational services are provided by the Coombes Primary School, which is situated adjacent to the Coombes Woods.

=== Landmarks ===
There is a war memorial cross that commemorates the 31 people from Arborfield, Newland and Barkham who died or went missing in both world wars.

A Cold War remnant was found near the village in 2019. An Underground Monitoring Post was excavated during archaeological works. It is believed to be built in 1961 as part of the United Kingdom Warning and Monitoring Organisation and operated until 1968. An above-ground observation post traces its origins to 1936.

== Transport ==
Reading Buses operates bus transport in Arborfield Cross. The village is connected to the local towns of Wokingham and Reading with the Leopard 3 service. Horseman Coaches operates two infrequent bus services, the 145 and 244, connecting Arborfield to Winnersh.

== Royal Connection ==
In the winter of 1924, The Prince of Wales (later Edward VIII and Duke of Windsor) suffered a heavy fall at the first fence of a race for Lord Cavan's Cup held at the Arborfield Cross Point-to-Point meeting. The Prince, who was known for his daredevil horsemanship, something that his father, George V, tried to stop, was concussed for approximately half an hour. This led to questions being raised in the House of Commons as to the safe well-being of the Prince, and the Prime Minister wrote to the Prince on 19 March 1924, appealing to the Prince to give up competitive riding. A subsequent letter to the Prince from his father, dated 30 March 1924, asked for similar but confirmed that the Prince could still enjoy hunting and playing polo.
