= Barkham =

Village in Berkshire, England

Coordinates: 51.402°N 0.876°W

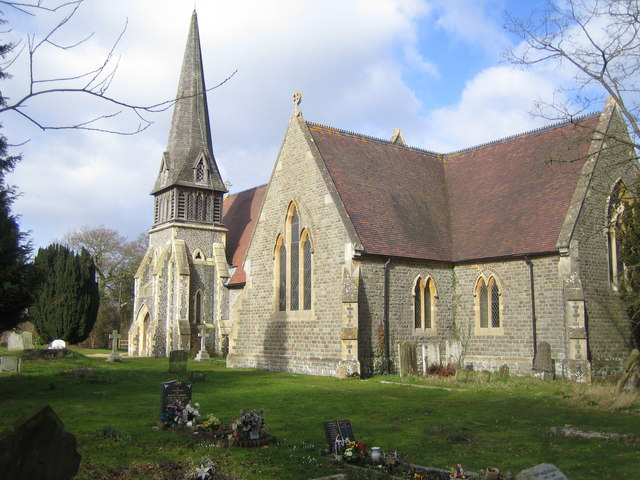
- St James' parish church

- Location within Berkshire
- Population: 3,511 (2001 census); 3,348 (2011 Census)
- OS grid reference: SU7867
- Civil parish: Barkham
- Unitary authority: Wokingham
- Ceremonial county: Berkshire
- Region: South East
- Country: England
- Sovereign state: United Kingdom
- Post town: Wokingham
- Postcode district: RG40, RG41
- Dialling code: 0118
- Police: Thames Valley
- Fire: Royal Berkshire
- Ambulance: South Central
- UK Parliament: Wokingham
- Website: Barkham

Barkham is a village and civil parish in the borough of Wokingham in Berkshire, England, located around 2 miles (3.2 km) southwest of the town of Wokingham.

== History ==
Barkham dates back to 951, when a Saxon thane gave Bloreham to the monks of Abingdon Abbey. In Saxon times, it passed from the rule of the Abbey, and during the time of King Edward the Confessor, it was owned by a Saxon thane named Ælmer. After the Conquest, it was taken possession of by William the Conqueror.

In 1630 and 1655, the inhabitants petitioned the constable of Windsor Castle against enclosures made by Richard Arrowsmith who, under licence from James I, had built a hunting lodge and formed a deer park at Bear Wood. This would later become Barkham Manor.

John de Barkham held the fee under Henry de Early. He forfeited about 1249, but was restored before 1253, when Jon, the son of Robert de Barkham, levied a fine of lands in Barkham. In 1335, the lands passed to the Bullock family, who held it until the end of the 16th century.

== Geography ==
The old part of Barkham is the small settlement by the parish church and is close to Barkham Street. However most of the population lives in the north-east of the parish, around the post office, or in the Arborfield Garrison, which is largely in Barkham. It is a rural parish, mostly consisting of dairy farmland and woods, despite being surrounded by the town of Wokingham and the large villages of Winnersh, Arborfield Cross and Finchampstead.

== Etymology ==
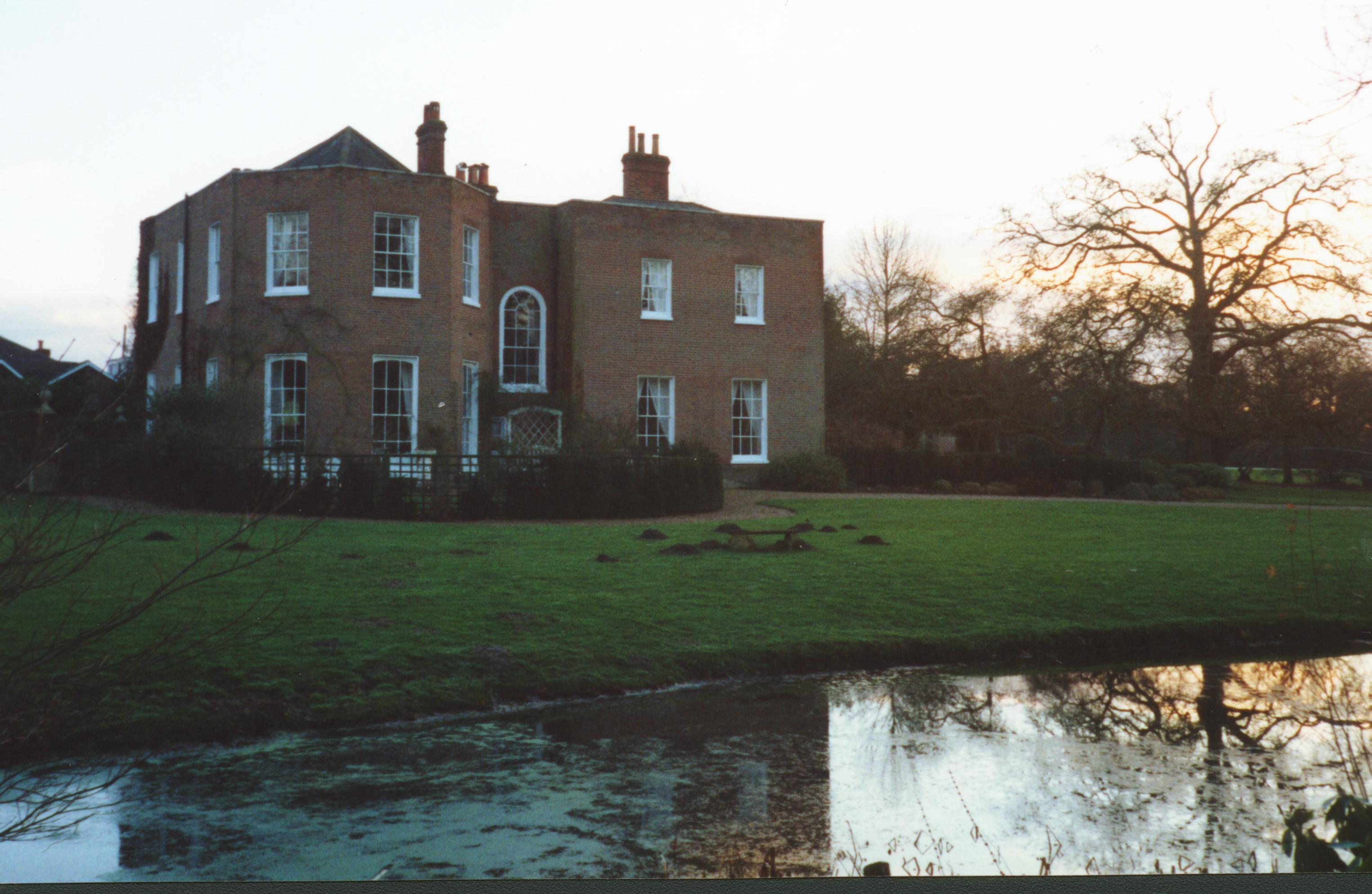
Barkham Manor house in winter

The toponym "Barkham" is derived from the Old English bercheham meaning "birch home" referring to the birch trees on the edge of Windsor Great Park. The name evolved via forms including Berkham in the 14th century and Barcombe in the 18th century.

== Manor ==
In King Edward III's reign the income from Barkham Manor helped to pay for the rebuilding of Windsor Castle and, not long afterwards, timber from Barkham was sent to make the roof of Westminster Abbey.

For many centuries the manor house was a secondary home of the Bullock family. The Bull Inn public house in Barkham is named in reference to their surname. The Bullocks had inherited the manor from the family of William Neville, a 13th-century valet to Saint Thomas Cantilupe, the Bishop of Hereford and Chancellor of England, from whom the manor was originally bought. The manor passed by marriage and inheritance through the Standen, Waterman, Kingsmill and Pitt families. In about 1783, the manor was purchased by the Dowager Countess Gower, the third wife of John Leveson-Gower, 1st Earl Gower, and became the property of the Leveson-Gower family. The present manor house is a late 18th-century Georgian building of two wings of differing dates. Barkham had two moated farm-houses. One of these survives, having been divided into two cottages.

== Parish church ==
The earliest known record of the Church of England parish church of Saint James dates from 1220. The ancient church was pulled down in 1860 and the present church building was built in 1860–61 or 1862. The ancient church door remains in the garden of Weston House in Wokingham. The new church was designed in a 13th-century Gothic Revival style by the architects J.B. Clacy and Son of Reading. The chancel and transepts were added or rebuilt in 1887. The building retains two features from the earlier church: a late 13th-century wooden memorial effigy of a woman, thought to be that of Mistress Agnes Neville, daughter of a lord of the manor in the 14th century, and the late 18th-century baptismal font. The bell-tower has a ring of four bells cast in 1863 by John Warner and Sons of Cripplegate in the City of London.

A number of members of the Leveson-Gower family are buried in the church, including Lady Mary Tufton, Countess Gower, widow of the first Earl Gower; her son Admiral John Leveson-Gower (d.1792); his son, General John Leveson-Gower and daughter-in-law Isabella Mary Leveson-Gower (née Broke); as well as his grandson, John Leveson-Gower (d.1883), with his wife Charlotte (d.1876), son Sackville (d.1874), and mother-in-law the Right Hon. Lady Harriet Mitchell (d.1855).

Rev. David Davies (1741–1819) was Rector of Barkham from 1782 until his death in 1819. He studied the condition of the labouring poor, recorded statistics of their wages, cost of food, etc. in various districts of England and Scotland. He published his findings in 1785 in the form of a book called Cases of Labourers in Husbandry Stated and Considered. Rev. Peter Ditchfield, FSA (1854–1930) was Rector of Barkham from 1886 until his death. He was a Freemason, historian and prolific author. With William Page he co-edited three Berkshire volumes of the Victoria County History, which were published in 1907, 1923 and 1924.

== Social and economic history ==
Another prominent farming family, that of Ball, is erroneously said to be that of George Washington's mother, Mary Ball Washington. They lived in the parish from the late 15th to the mid-17th century, but William Lee Ball, the man once thought to have emigrated to Virginia and become Mary's great grandfather, may have actually died in London and his family lived in the East Berkshire area for at least two more generations. This is still disputed by Americans relatives of Mary Ball. An open field system of farming prevailed in the parish until early in the 19th century. Parliament passed the Windsor Forest Act 1813 (53 Geo. 3. c. 158) authorising enclosure for Barkham, but this was not implemented until 1821.

== Parish Council ==
Barkham Parish council meets regularly at the Arborfield Green Community Centre. It has 10 councillors that are elected by the parish residents for a term of four years.

== Residents Association ==
Barkham Village Residents’ Association (“BVRA”) was formed in 1987, initially in response to a Planning Application for housing development within the Coombes - a woodland rich in a diversity of wildlife and designated an area of special scientific interest. Planning issues remain an interest of the BVRA. After the threat to the Coombes subsided, the BVRA continues to contribute to Barkham's community spirit by running social events and the production of a quarterly newsletter and website.

== Schools ==
Bohunt School Wokingham, opened at Arborfield Green in Barkham parish in 2016, is a mixed-sex independent academy.

== Sources ==
- Ditchfield, P.H.; Page, W.H., eds. (1923). A History of the County of Berkshire, Volume 3. Victoria County History. pp. 238–241.
- Pevsner, Nikolaus (1966). Berkshire. The Buildings of England. Harmondsworth: Penguin Books. p. 75.
