= John Clacy =

John Berry Clacy
- Born: 1810
- Died: 1880
- Occupation: Architect
- Practice: Reading, Berkshire (1868)

John Berry Clacy (1810–1880) was a Victorian architect whose practice was centred on Reading and Wokingham in the English county of Berkshire.

== Family ==
John's paternal grandfather and his ancestors were long resident around Barkham in Berkshire. John was brother-in-law of the Australian travel writer Ellen Clacy.

== Career ==
Most of Clacy's significant works are Gothic Revival buildings, but the Corn Exchange in Reading that he designed with F. Hawkes is in a style that Nikolaus Pevsner described as "free, debased Renaissance". Clacy's son had joined him in his practice by 1862. In 1868 Clacy and Son's practice was recorded as being in Reading.

== Work ==
- St. Mary's parish church, Burghfield, Berkshire, 1843
- King Alfred's Grammar School, Wantage, Berkshire (now Oxfordshire), 1849–50
- Corn Exchange, Reading, 1854 (with F. Hawkes)
- St. Helen's parish church, Dry Sandford, Oxfordshire, 1855
- Holy Trinity and All Saints parish church, Hawley, Hampshire: extensions, 1857
- St. Andrew's parish church, South Stoke, Oxfordshire: restoration and extensions, 1857
- St. James' parish church, Barkham, Berkshire, 1860–62 (with his son)

== Sources ==
- Brodie, Antonia; Felstead, Alison; Franklin, Jonathan; Pinfield, Leslie; Oldfield, Jane, eds. (2001). Directory of British Architects 1834–1914, A–K. London & New York: Continuum. p. 375. ISBN 0-8264-5513-1.
- Pevsner, Nikolaus (1966). Berkshire. The Buildings of England. Harmondsworth: Penguin Books. pp. 75, 107, 130, 204, 254.
- Pevsner, Nikolaus; Lloyd, David (1967). Hampshire and the Isle of Wight. The Buildings of England. Harmondsworth: Penguin Books. p. 280.
- Sherwood, Jennifer; Pevsner, Nikolaus (1974). Oxfordshire. The Buildings of England. Harmondsworth: Penguin Books. p. 773. ISBN 0-14-071045-0.
