= Corn Exchange, Reading =

Commercial building in Reading, Berkshire, England

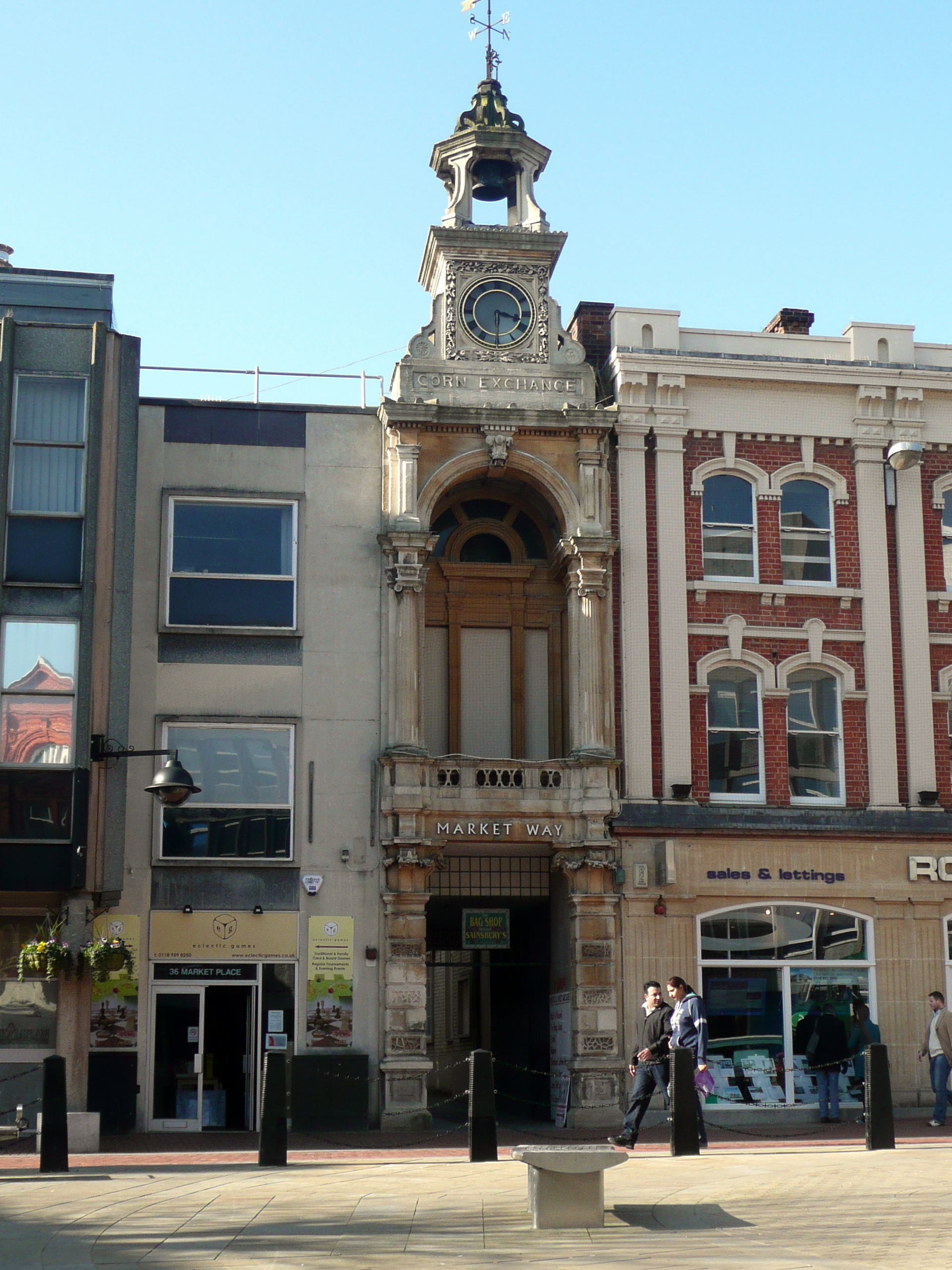
- Corn Exchange, Reading

- Shown in Berkshire
- 51.4557°N 0.9698°W
- Location: Market Place, Reading

History
- Built: 1855

Site notes
- Architect(s): John Clacy and Francis Hawkes
- Architectural style: Renaissance style

Listed Building – Grade II
- Official name: Corn Exchange Arcade Entrance
- Designated: 26 July 1973
- Reference no.: 1113539

The Corn Exchange is a former commercial building in Reading, Berkshire, England. The structure, which was commissioned as a corn exchange, is a Grade II listed building.

== History ==
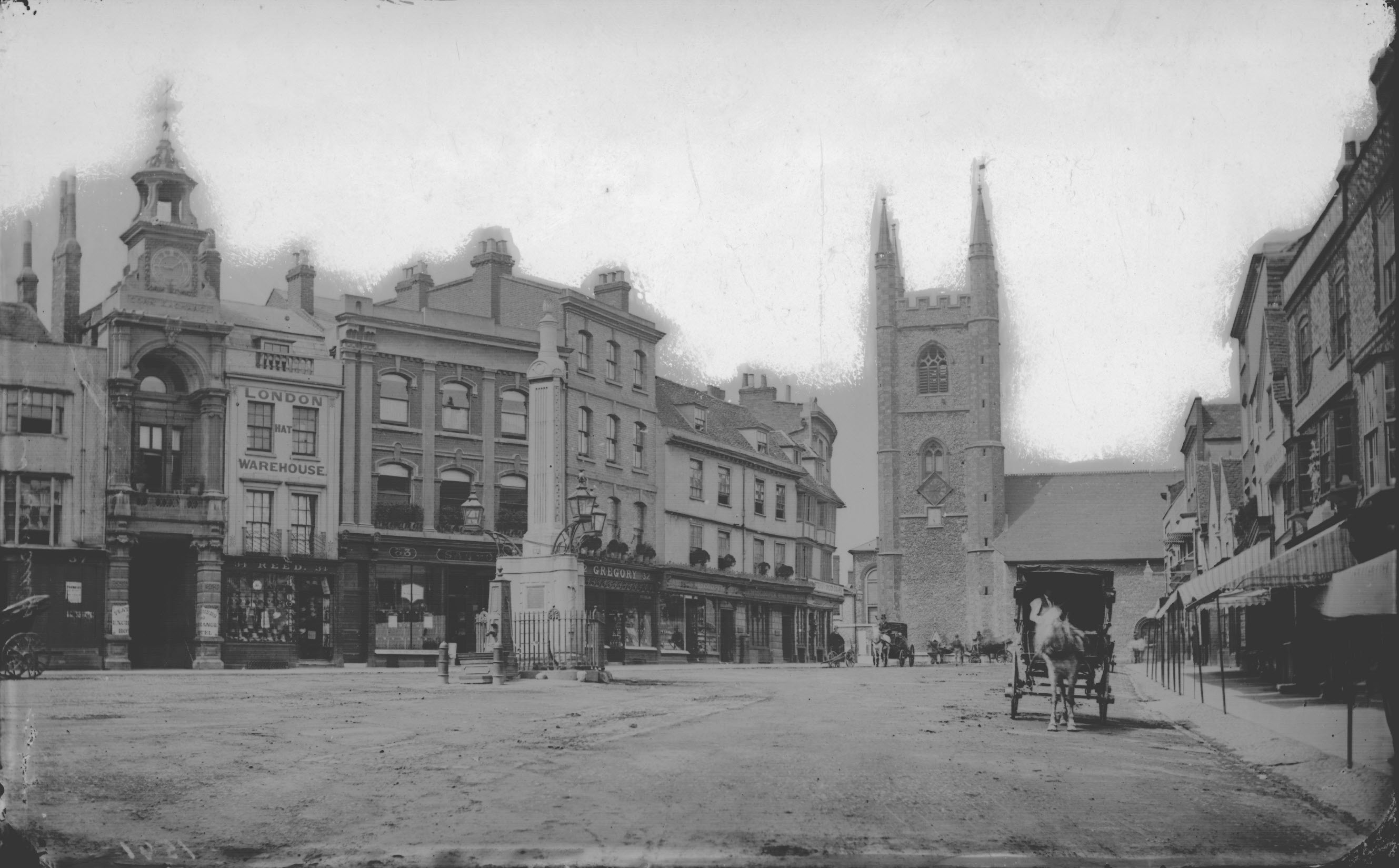
The Market Place showing the entrance to the Corn Exchange in 1870

Until the mid-19th century, the corn merchants of Reading traded at open air stalls in the Market Place. The initiative to commission a purpose-built corn exchange arose, unusually, from the members of Reading Corporation rather than a group of businessmen and required an act of parliament to empower the corporation accordingly. The foundation stone for the new building was laid in September 1854. It was designed by John Clacy and Francis Hawkes in the Renaissance style, built in ashlar stone and was officially opened on 23 June 1855. The opening was supported by a concert given by the band of the Royal Berkshire Militia.

The design involved a three-stage entrance tower facing onto the Market Place. The first stage was formed by an opening flanked by banded pilasters supporting an entablature, the second stage was formed by a round headed recess with a balcony flanked by Ionic order columns supporting a moulded architrave with a keystone as well as a cornice, and the third stage was formed by a frieze inscribed with the words "Corn Exchange" and by a clock face with an elaborate border, all surmounted by a bell turret and a weather vane. Internally, the principal room was the main hall which was formed by a series of cast iron columns supporting a glass roof.

The use of the building as a corn exchange declined significantly in the wake of the Great Depression of British Agriculture in the late 19th century. In the 1930s, a modern corn exchange, designed by Charles Smith and Son, was erected adjacent to the Cattle Market in Great Knollys Street and the old corn exchange in the Market Place was increasingly used as a roller-skating rink. The building was requisitioned for military use during the Second World War and 600,000 sandbags were stored there. It was badly damaged on 10 February 1943, when a single Luftwaffe plane machine-gunned and bombed the town centre.

Following the war, it reverted to use as a roller-skating rink but, after falling into disuse in the 1950s, the main hall was demolished to make way for a modern shopping centre in June 1963. The entrance tower, now referred to as the Market Way Archway, continues to provide alternative access to the Sainsbury's store in Broad Street.

== See also ==
- Corn exchanges in England
