= Seid Behram =

Bosnian footballer (born 1998)

Personal information
- Date of birth: 12 July 1998 (age 28)
- Place of birth: Mostar, Bosnia and Herzegovina
- Height: 1.83 m (6 ft 0 in)
- Position: Midfielder

Youth career
- –2014: Velež Mostar
- 2014–2015: Željezničar
- 2016: Reading

Senior career*
Years	Team	Apps	(Gls)
2017	Racing Union Luxembourg	7	(0)
2018–2021	Velež Mostar	60	(12)
2022	Mladost Ždralovi	13	(3)
2022	Slaven Belupo	4	(0)
2023	Mladost Ždralovi	14	(4)

International career
2014–2015	Bosnia and Herzegovina U17	5	(0)
- * Club domestic league appearances and goals as of 30 May 2021

Seid Behram (born 12 July 1998) is a Bosnian professional footballer who last played as a midfielder for NK Mladost Ždralovi.

== Club career ==
Born in Mostar, Bosnia and Herzegovina, Behram started to play football at his hometown club Velež. As a youth player, he joined the youth academy of Bosnian giants Željezničar. Before the second half of the 2015–16 season, Behram joined the youth academy of English Championship club Reading, after trialing for Premier League side Everton. In 2016, he almost signed for Lille in the French Ligue 1, but the transfer never happened.

Before the second half of the 2016–17 season, Behram signed with Luxembourgish club Racing Union Luxembourg, but left due to problems with the new manager.

Before the second half of the 2017–18 season, he returned to Velež. On 25 May 2019, Behram won the First League of FBiH with Velež after the club beat Bosna Visoko and got promoted back to the Bosnian Premier League. He left the club in May 2021, following a heavy injury.

In December 2021, Behram moved to the Croatian third-tier side Mladost Ždralovi., earning himself a move to the top-tier side Slaven Belupo the following summer. Not finding enough playing time at Slaven he returned to Mladost Ždralovi at the start of 2023, but left the club again in the summer of 2023.

== International career ==
Behram represented the Bosnia and Herzegovina U17 national team, earning 5 caps.

== Honours ==
Velež Mostar

- First League of FBiH: 2018–19
