= Arborfield =

Village in Berkshire, England

Coordinates: 51.401°N 0.916°W

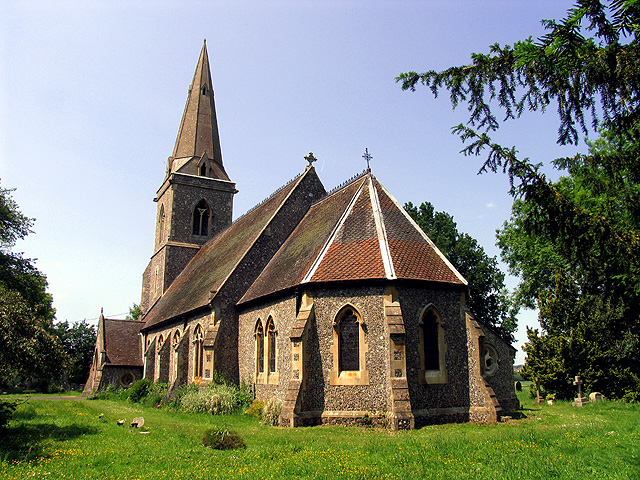
- St Bartholomew's parish church

- Location within Berkshire
- OS grid reference: SU7567
- Civil parish: Arborfield and Newland
- Unitary authority: Wokingham
- Ceremonial county: Berkshire
- Region: South East
- Country: England
- Sovereign state: United Kingdom
- Post town: Reading
- Postcode district: RG2
- Dialling code: 0118
- Police: Thames Valley
- Fire: Royal Berkshire
- Ambulance: South Central
- UK Parliament: Wokingham
- Website: Arborfield Village

Arborfield is a village in the civil parish of Arborfield and Newland, in the Borough of Wokingham in Berkshire, England. It is about 5 miles (8 km) south-east of Reading, about 4 miles (6.4 km) west of Wokingham. It lies about 1 mile (2 km) west of the village of Arborfield Cross and the two villages have become collectively known as Arborfield, with no signs marking their boundary.

== Etymology ==
The name 'Arborfield' is first recorded in 1166 as Edburgefeld, meaning 'Edburga's Field', Edburga being a widespread Anglo-Saxon lady's name. It evolved through variations to the modern Arborfield as first recorded in the 17th century.

== Notable buildings ==
=== Arborfield Hall ===
The manor house, which originally stood on the site, was occupied by the Bullock family from the mid-12th century. The last Arborfield Hall, built in 1837, was the home of Sir John Conroy, Controller of the Household of the Duchess of Kent. It was demolished in 1955.

=== Churches ===
The present Church of England parish church of Saint Bartholomew is a Gothic Revival building designed by J Picton and built in 1863. The new building replaces an older St Bartholomew's church, known as the 'Wooden Chapel of Edburgefeld', that had been built in the 13th century and altered probably early in the 18th century. When the new church was consecrated the roof of the old one was removed and later layers of plaster stripped from the interior walls, revealing Medieval wall paintings of "figure subjects and geometrical and masonry patterns" that "covered the walls". These have now been lost and the church ruins have greatly deteriorated. The current church is notable for one of its 6 bells. The number one bell (treble) was cast c.1399 at the Wokingham Bell Foundry, it is notable as being the only Wokingham Foundry bell nearby to Wokingham as well as one of the oldest bells still regularly rung. The army garrison has its own garrison church, a 20th-century building dedicated to Saint Eligius.

== Army garrison ==
Arborfield is also known for the School of Electronic & Aeronautical Engineering (SEAE) where the British Army train their Electronic, Aircraft and Avionic engineers for RADAR, Telecommunications, Control Equipment, Aircraft (Airframes and Engines) and Avionic (Aviation electronic and weapon system) modalities. Arborfield Garrison is about 1 mile (1.6 km) the other side of Arborfield Cross and which is mostly in the civil parish of Barkham.

== International Cocoa Quarantine Centre ==
Since 1985, Arborfield has also been the home of the International Cocoa Quarantine Centre whose aim is to investigate and reduce diseases in cocoa plants worldwide.

== Administrative history ==
Arborfield historically formed part of the ancient parish of Sonning. Arborfield had its own chapel of ease by the 13th century, and became a separate parish in the 16th century.

In 1948 Arborfield merged with the neighbouring parish of Newland to form a new civil parish called Arborfield and Newland. Newland had also been a township of the ancient parish of Sonning, which had become part of the parish of Hurst in 1831 before becoming a separate civil parish in 1866. At the 1931 census (the last before the abolition of the parish), Arborfield had a population of 348.

== Sources ==
- Ditchfield, P.H.; Page, W.H., eds. (1923). A History of the County of Berkshire, Volume 3. Victoria County History. pp. 200–203.
- Pevsner, Nikolaus (1960). Buckinghamshire. The Buildings of England. Harmondsworth: Penguin Books. p. 66. ISBN 0-14-071019-1.
