= Fremad Amager =

Coordinates: 55°38′47″N 12°35′57″E

- Full name: Boldklubben Fremad Amager (mother club); Fremad Amager Elite ApS (professional section)
- Nicknames: Englene (en: The Angels); Ama'rkanerne
- Founded: 10 June 1910; 116 years ago
- Ground: Sundby Idrætspark, Copenhagen
- Capacity: 7,200 (2,500 seated)
- Owner: Lars Bax Sander Hein (via Salescorp Denmark ApS)
- Chairman: Erik Truelsen (mother club / amateur section); Alexander Wedersøe Saugmann (professional section)
- Head coach: John Bredal
- League: Danish 2nd Division
- 2025–26: Danish 2nd Division, 7th of 12
- Website: www.fremadamagerelite.dk
Home colours	Away colours

Boldklubben Fremad Amager (meaning in English: The Ball Club Forward Amager; abbreviated Fremad A) is a Danish professional football club based in the district of Amager Vest, Copenhagen. The club's senior men's team play in 2nd Division, the third tier in the Danish football league system. The club have primarily played their home games at Sundby Idrætspark since the stadium's inauguration in 1922.

Fremad Amager's last spell in the highest football league in Denmark was in the autumn of 1994. Ever since the first participation in the first nationwide league tournament in 1927, and subsequent promotion in 1929, the club has spent the majority of its history – with the exception of two seasons – in the different divisional structures (known as "Danmarksturneringen i fodbold"). The club reached the Danish Cup final in 1971–72 season while playing at the second highest league level, but lost against Vejle BK, who had also won the Danish championship in 1971. As a result, BK Fremad Amager participated in the 1972–73 European Cup Winners' Cup, but did not advance beyond the first round.

Described as a working class team, the Sundbyvester-based club has had long-standing rivalries against neighbouring clubs BK Frem, Kastrup BK and B 1908.

== Club history ==
The club was co-founder of the representative team Fodbold-Alliancen in 1940 and remained a member until 1949, when they switched to the competing representative team Stævnet and stayed with the football combination for a total of 25 years (1949–1954 and 1959–1979) until it ceased to exist in 1979. On 1 July 2008, the club participated in the formation of the superstructure FC Amager together with neighbouring clubs Dragør BK, Kastrup BK and Kløvermarken FB. The merger was short-lived. After only 8-month of existence, the merged club went bankrupt on 30 March 2009 at the start of second half of the 2008–09 season, with Fremad Amager hence experiencing a third bankruptcy in its history – the highest number of bankruptcies by any Danish football club; the first being on 22 November 1984 and the second on 13 November 1990. The league licence, that the merged team was playing under, was returned to Fremad Amager, who was relegated to the lower ranking regional football league, Copenhagen Series, shortly before the club's 100 years anniversary.

Since 2013, the club has consisted of an amateur department and a professional section, which is wholly owned by Fremad Amager Elite ApS – a private limited company created on 2 December 2013, initially with 80/20% ownership split between the new investors and the remaining 20% by the members – and small portion by the club's amateur department.

In 2018, companies controlled by Anton Zingarevich purchased a controlling majority in the club. Zingarevich, the son of Russian oligarch Boris Zingarevich, simultaneously owned the Russian club Vista-Gelendzhik and Ghanaian side Cheetah FC. In between 2019 and 2021, Fremad signed eight players from Vista-Gelendzhik and three from Cheetah. Following Zingarevich's 2021 takeover of Bulgarian side Botev Plovdiv, there were also a total of nine transfer movements with that club in the two transfer windows immediately after. Zingarevich then sold his shares in Fremad to American investors. As of 2023, the club still has ongoing cases with Zingarevich regarding unpaid debt accrued under his custodianship.

External images
- Match poster for the club's home game against Nyborg G&IF on 17 April 1955 during their tenure in the Danish 3rd Division.
- Match poster for the 1971–72 Danish Cup final against Vejle BK on 11 May 1972, played at Københavns Idrætspark.
- Match poster for their European Cup Winners' Cup game against KS Besa, played at Valby Idrætspark, on 13 September 1972.
- Match poster for the local derby against B 1908, contested on 28 September 2014 as part of the 2014–15 season campaign.

== Colours and crest ==
BK Fremad Amager's official colour scheme is blue and white. The shirt design have had several variations to its design throughout the club's history. The club's first playing kit after its foundation was inspired by the blue and white striped shirt and black shorts worn by the players of one of the period's best Danish association football teams, Kjøbenhavns BK (KB). In the early years of the club, the shirt design was not standardised, and several variations (e.g. collars vs. round-necks, striped vs. single colour sleeves and the same number of stripes not aligned in the same formation) appeared during matches. A few years before the club's promotion to the KBUs Mesterskabsrække in the 1920s, an entire black home kit dominated by a red thick V-shaped pattern in the front and back, starting from the shoulders going all the way down to the players stomach/lower back, was adopted. In 1945, a slow transition to a new shirt design was initiated, when the club's youth and senior teams started playing in a blue shirt with white collar and white sleeves, white shorts and blue socks, but did not completely leave the previous black/red shirt design behind until the following year. For many years this kit design was mentioned directly in the second paragraph in the club's statutes (e.g. ratified on 2 February 2005), but the sentences have since February 2008 been simplified to only include a reference to a blue shirt, while the away kit can have different colours. The current home kit's basic design consists of a blue shirt, white shorts and blue socks, which was first used in 1973.

Combinations of or deviations from the home and away kit design have occurred, including temporarily using a third unofficial kit design or colour, to accommodate an unexpected situation before or during a match. During a 1927–28 KBUs Mesterskabsrække match against BK Frem at Københavns Idrætspark on 6 May 1928, the players was forced to change their outfit from red shirts and white shorts in the first half to red shirts and black shorts in the second half, because the combination were too similar to BK Frem's kit (red/blue vertical striped shirts and white shorts). For the 1926–27 KBUs Mesterskabsrække campaign, the club used a secondary kit design consisting of a red and white halved jersey, black shorts and red socks, which was prominently featured in their first league fixture of the season against BK Frem and in the relegation play-off match at the end of the season against Handelsstandens BK. A similar secondary kit design had been in use for the 1925 Fælledklubbernes Pokalturnering campaign, but with a blue and white colour scheme, resembling the traditional shirt design of Blackburn Rovers F.C.

The current club crest was introduced in the summer of 1952, featuring a shield with the club's name in capital, oblique letters across the midsection in a left to right diagonal line, with a 1950-era 18-panel ball (model without laces) in the top left corner and the letter A (short for Amager) in the bottom right corner. It replaced the club's first crest, a circular emblem featuring a black and white vintage eight panel stitched ball with five laces on the left side (known from beginning of the 20th century, appearance identical to a basketball), with the name of the club in capital letters across the top section (the letters "R" and "A" interlocking each other and the letters "F" and "D" extended in a simplified calligraphy style). The club's second crest first featured on the player's left chest on the shirt at the start of the 1950s, but disappeared shortly hereafter, and did not reappear as a regular component until the 2000s. The names of the original designers of both crests are unknown. Professionalism in Danish association football was introduced during the 1970s, making way for prize checks to the players and shirt sponsors. The first sponsor displayed on the front of the player's shirts was the local company Storno, who signed a two-years contract for the period 1970–71. For the club's centenary celebrations in 2010, a special emblem was inscribed in a green-coloured wreath consisting of crossed conventionalized branches of the olive tree (similar to the flag of the United Nations) and text above and below the shield noting the centenary.

=== Home kit ===
1914–1920	1924–1946	1950s	201?–2013	2015–2017	2018–present

=== Away kit ===
~1925	1926–1927	~1928	–2013	2016	2016–2017	2018–present

=== Kit manufacturers and shirt sponsors ===
Years	Kit manufacturer	Main shirt sponsor		Back of shirt sponsor	
Years	Kit manufacturer	Brand	Company name	Brand	Company name
2010–2012	Adidas	Hotel Amager PUB		N/A	
2012–2014	Adidas	Fagfolkenes Flytteforening		Clausen's Service	
2014–2016	Adidas	City Container		Hafnov's Ejendomsservice	
2016–2019	Adidas	HC Container		various or none	
2019	Adidas	no sponsor (July–September)		none	
2019–	Adidas	Øens Erhvervsnetværk (Note: Kofoeds Skole was featured on the front of the shirts at the cup match on 17 December 2020, while Malerfirma Schmeer A/S were the main shirt sponsors for the cup match on 10 February 2021.)		none	

== Grounds ==
Boldklubben Fremad started placing at a field located across the road of the then "Cyklistpavillonen Alhambra Park" (demolished in 1916), where the club was originally founded. The field was later converted to a traffic hotspot/square now known as Sundbyvester Plads. In 1916 Amager Boldspil-Union (ABU) was assigned an area by the local municipality in the northern part of Amager, now known as Kløvermarken. The club started playing all their important matches in the local league and cup tournaments at a ground referred to as "Banen ved Kløvermarksvejen", which was located across a pumping station, handling most of the capital's waste water – hence, the isle is nicknamed "Lorteøen". The old ground was kept as a playing field for the reserve teams and the youth squads for a couple of years. In 1922, the club officially moved into Sundby Idrætspark (also referred to as "Banen ved Englandsvej"), which has been their home ground ever since. The club started playing several league and cup matches in 1926 at Københavns Idrætspark, when they were promoting the KBUs Mesterskabsrække. Due to the then-lack of facilities (spot lights etc.) and capacity at Sundby Idrætspark, some competitive matches in later years were moved to Valby Idrætspark and Gentofte Sportspark. In the summer of 2018, the playing field was converted to artificial grass and spot lights were installed.

== First-team squad ==
As of 6 September 2026

=== Current squad ===
Note: Flags indicate national team as defined under FIFA eligibility rules; some limited exceptions apply. Players may hold more than one non-FIFA nationality.

No.	Pos.	Nation	Player
1	GK	IRQ	Mohammad Hassan
2	DF	ERI	Jonas Idris
3	DF	DEN	Mads Samson
4	DF	DEN	Nikolaj Larsen
5	DF	DEN	Matti Olsen
6	MF	DEN	Bertram Manniche
7	MF	DEN	Frederik Holst
8	MF	DEN	Markus Bay
9	FW	DEN	Kenneth Zohore
10	MF	SWE	Amir Ayari
11	MF	DEN	Christian Hørby
12	DF	DEN	Magnus Gaunsbæk

No.	Pos.	Nation	Player
15	FW	DEN	Martin Lauritsen
16	DF	DEN	Jeppe Brinch
17	FW	NOR	Oliver Thomassen
18	MF	DEN	Mads Beyer
19	DF	DEN	Jonas Lyshøj
20	FW	DEN	Andreas Bredahl
21	FW	UGA	Joseph Ssendyowa
22	DF	DEN	Daniel Mortensen
23	GK	DEN	Victor Schönewolf-Greulich
25	FW	DEN	Mohcin Belouahi
26	MF	DEN	Julius Lockhart (on loan from Hvidovre II)
45	FW	DEN	Christoffer Boateng

=== Youth players in use 2026-27 ===
Note: Flags indicate national team as defined under FIFA eligibility rules; some limited exceptions apply. Players may hold more than one non-FIFA nationality.

No.	Pos.	Nation	Player

=== Out on loan ===
Note: Flags indicate national team as defined under FIFA eligibility rules; some limited exceptions apply. Players may hold more than one non-FIFA nationality.

No.	Pos.	Nation	Player

=== Retired numbers ===
Retiring of shirt numbers is not a custom followed by the club's board. Only once have a number been officially retired in honor of the official fan club, the first incarnation of De Blå/Hvide Engle (1993–2008), as a reference to the fans being the twelfth man on the team. The proposal, originally conceived by the fan club in the fall of 2007, was however short-lived and 12 was quickly reinstated as a valid shirt number in the wake of the introduction of an official fan club, named Øens Ørne (2008–2009), for the superstructure FC Amager. The original fan club was refounded in the fall of 2009.

12 (Denmark) De Blå/Hvide Engle (official fan club)

== Personnel ==
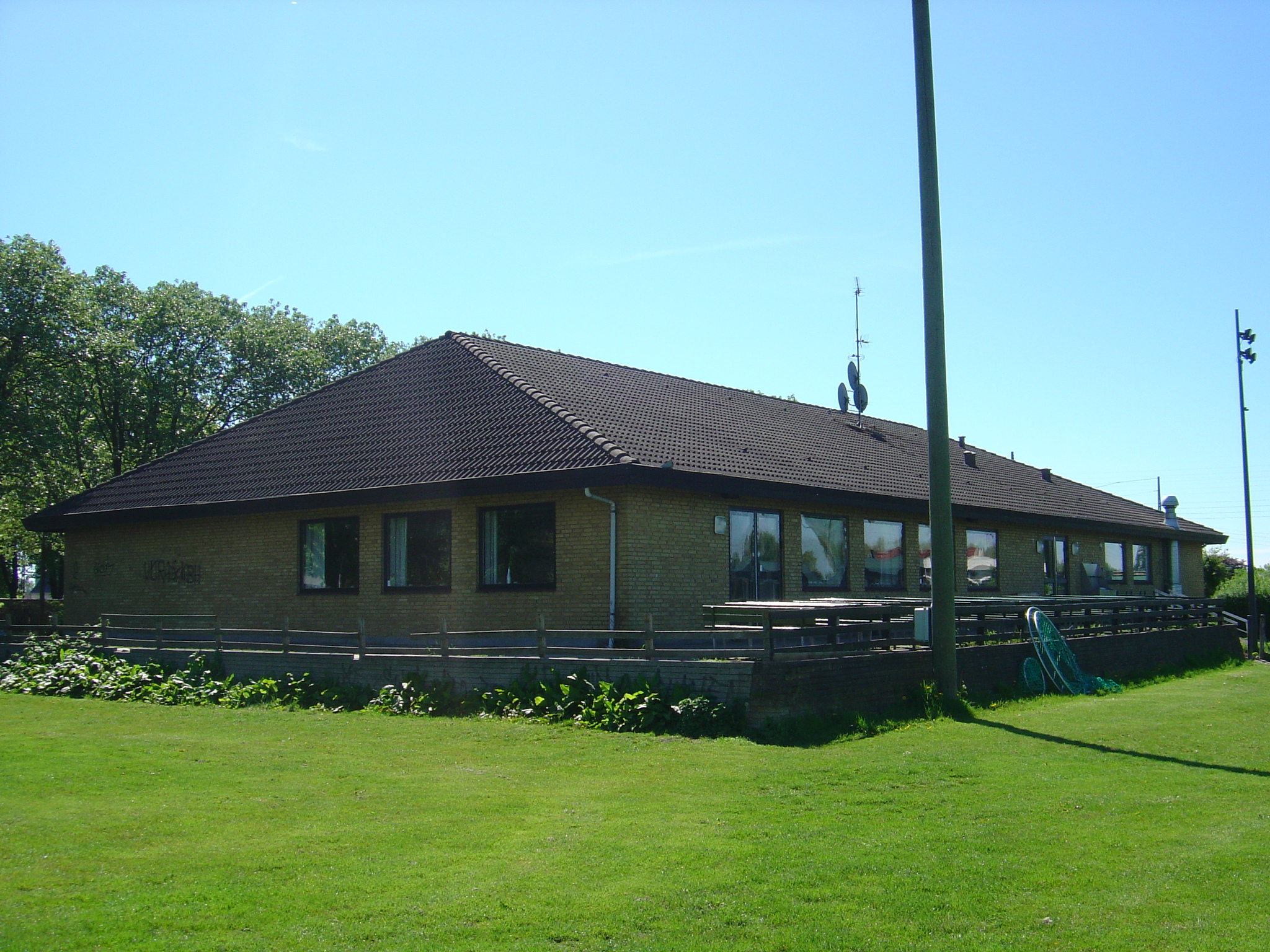
The club's residence since 1975, which also houses its administration.

=== Current technical staff ===
Position	Name
Chairman of the Board	
Chief Executive Officer	(Denmark) Jacob 'Gaxe' Gregersen
Sporting director	(Denmark) David Boysen
Head coach	(Denmark) John Bredal
Assistant coach	(Denmark) Daniel Elly Pedersen
Assistant coach Goalkeeper coach	(Denmark) Jesper Christiansen
Physical Coach; Physiotherapist	(Denmark) Victor Larsen
Chairman (amateur section)	(Denmark) Erik Truelsen
Academy manager (AC Amager)	(Denmark) Nikolaj Borge

=== Head coach history ===
Before the club's permanent introduction of a sovereign head coach/trainer, the line-up for each game and training for both the first team and the reserves was headed by members of a match selection committee – referred to as udtagelseskomite (UK) or spilleudvalg – that also consisted of representatives from the board and players, all headed by a chairman, and elected at the club's annual general meeting. At times, the committee consisted of a single person, which was the case during the period 1966–1970 (headed by Leif Foli Andersen) – at a general meeting in late January 1971, this was changed to a committee of three members. This was following by a period, where the head coach was dependent of the dispositions of the committee and their voting rights, until the committee in itself was ultimately abolished in the 1980s. The person responsible for direction of the first senior team has since traditionally been given the title of head coach/trainer, and the position was first held by Sophus Hansen in 1928. The Amager-based club introduced the manager title for the first time on 1 January 2002, when Michele Guarini assumed the role as both manager and head coach/trainer. Between 27 October 2006 and 29 March 2007, Benny Johansen was given the title of manager/sports director with the primary responsibility for e.g. tactical match team composition, playing strategy and training planning, while Peer F. Hansen was given the title of first senior team coach/trainer and second in line under the manager. The tasks related to the manager/sports director position have varied, but more responsibilities have generally been given to the head coach.

Former player Ole Bloch and the then UK-chairman Poul Mathiasen acted as temporary coaches during two league matches on 7 and 14 November 1976, when the newly appointed head coach, Flemming Olsen, became absent due to a pre-scheduled course stay in Switzerland – they are hence not ranked in the official list of head coaches. Flemming Olsen was first supposed to take over the team's training from 1 January 1977, but his tenure was pushed ahead of time, when Arne Sørensen was hospitalised the day before a league match on 31 October 1976. Due to head coach Benny Johansen's double bypass surgery at a London hospital in January 2005, the assistant coach Peer F. Hansen and the coach for the reserves, Jan Zirk, took care of the training and headed the friendlies for several weeks during the winter break, until the head coach officially returned ahead of the spring season's first match on 6 March 2005.

Following the declaration of bankruptcy of the professional superstructure, FC Amager, on 30 March 2009, the reserve team of BK Fremad Amager did formally not obtain an official status as the amateur club's new first senior men's team until the end of the 2008–09 season, when the league license was returned to the club. Effective immediately, all players and the coaching staff were released from their contractual obligations with FC Amager, including Michael Madsen. Hence, Lars Randrup, who was the head coach for the club's reserve team in the Copenhagen Series between 30 March and 30 June 2009, is not regarded as the club's official head coach during the intervening period. The Amager-club's first and only coaching-duo, Kim Petersen and Alex Andreasen, shared the role and responsibilities of head and assistant coach evenly in the fall season of 2009. After eight months as head coach for the team, Azrudin "Vali" Valentić became first team coach in the club on 1 July 2019, when Olof Mellberg becoming manager in a new structure of the coaching staff, resembling a British-style constellation.

Name	Nationality	From	To	Refs
Sophus Hansen	Denmark	12 September 1927	1928	
Carl "Skoma'r" Hansen	Denmark	11 October 1933	5 November 1933	
Emil Asmussen	Denmark	1937?	December 1944	
Niels Peter Hansen	Denmark	3 January 1945	31 May 1951	
Arne Kleven	Denmark	1 August 1951	30 June 1954	
Kaj Frandsen	Denmark	1 July 1954	30 June 1956	
Niels Peter Hansen	Denmark	1 July 1956	31 December 1958	
Alfred Mogensen	Denmark	1 January 1959	8 November 1959	
Arnold Olsen	Denmark	1 January 1960	31 December 1960	
Niels Peter Hansen	Denmark	1 January 1961	31 December 1962	
Oluf Wiborg	Denmark	1 January 1963	31 December 1965	
Alois Pheiffer	Austria	1 January 1966	31 December 1966	
Erling Sørensen	Denmark	1 January 1967	31 December 1970	
Knud Petersen	Denmark	1 January 1971	31 December 1972	
Harald Gronemann	Denmark	1 January 1973	31 December 1973	
Arne Sørensen	Denmark	1 January 1974	30 October 1976	
Flemming Olsen (Note: A course stay in Switzerland)	Denmark	30 October 1976	31 December 1977	
Peter Dahl	Denmark	2 January 1978	20 August 1981	
Finn Willy Sørensen	Denmark	20 August 1981	31 December 1984	
Erling Rydbirk	Denmark	1 January 1985	31 December 1987	
John Sinding	Denmark	1 January 1988	17 August 1990	
Poul Mathiasen †	Denmark	18 August 1990	October 1990	
Flemming Karlsen †	Denmark	October 1990	October 1990	
Tonni "Numme" Nielsen	Denmark	1 January 1991	12 October 1995	
Ole Rasmussen †	Denmark	12 October 1995	22 October 1995	
Torben Storm	Denmark	23 October 1995	30 June 1998	
Michael Schäfer	Denmark	1 July 1998	30 June 2001	
Jean Cetti Jensen	Denmark	1 July 2001	21 August 2001	
Torben "Theo" Hansen †	Denmark	21 August 2001	17 September 2001	
Michele Guarini	Denmark	24 September 2001	30 September 2004	
Benny Johansen (Note: Extended sick leave)	Denmark	4 October 2004	27 October 2006	
Peer F. Hansen	Denmark	27 October 2006	29 May 2007	
Jakob Friis-Hansen	Denmark	29 May 2007	5 May 2008	
Michael Madsen †	Denmark	7 May 2008	30 June 2008	
Michael Madsen ^{S}	Denmark	1 July 2008^{S}	30 March 2009^{S}	
Kim Petersen & Alex Andreasen	Denmark & Denmark	1 July 2009	31 December 2009	
Kjeld Uhre Møller	Denmark	1 January 2010	30 June 2011	
Martin Jungsgaard	Denmark	1 July 2011	22 June 2012	
Peer F. Hansen	Denmark	23 June 2012	14 October 2012	
Tim Ilsø	Denmark	15 October 2012	30 June 2014	
John "Faxe" Jensen	Denmark	1 July 2014	30 June 2018	
Jan Michaelsen	Denmark	1 July 2018	30 October 2018	
Azrudin "Vali" Valentić	Bosnia and Herzegovina	31 October 2018	30 June 2019	
Olof Mellberg	Sweden	1 July 2019	3 September 2019	
Azrudin "Vali" Valentić	Bosnia and Herzegovina	3 September 2019	7 January 2021	
Joakim Mattsson	Sweden	15 January 2021	17 May 2021	
Jesper Christiansen †	Denmark	17 May 2021	17 June 2021	
Peter Løvenkrands	Denmark	18 June 2021	26 June 2022	
John Bredal †	Denmark	27 June 2022	16 July 2022	
Michael Hemmingsen	Denmark	17 July 2022	2 December 2022	
Carit Falch	Denmark	4 January 2023	26 March 2024	
Christian Iversen	Denmark	26 March 2024	6 January 2026	
John Bredal	Denmark	6 January 2026	Present	

- †: Persons with this symbol in the "Name" column are italicised to denote caretaker appointments.
- ‡: Persons with this symbol in the "Name" column denote status as a playing head coach/trainer.
- ^{S}: Fremad Amager participated in the professional superstructure, FC Amager (July 2008 – March 2009), effectively making it the club's official representative/first senior men's team.

== Honours ==
=== Domestic ===
==== National leagues ====
- Danish Football Championship^{1}
  - Runners-up (2): 1939–40, 1940–41
  - Third place (1): 1946–47
- Second Highest Danish League^{2}
  - Winners (2): 1930–31, 1937–38
  - Runners-up (5): 1948–49, 1949–50, 1950–51, 1993^{q}, 1994^{f}
  - Group East Runners-up (1): 1935–36
- Third Highest Danish League^{3}
  - Runners-up (4): 1954–55, 1958, 1969, 1971, 2015–16
  - Group East Winners (4): 1969, 1971, 1987, 1991–92^{q}
  - Group East Runners-up (4): 1968, 1991, 2007–08
- Fourth Highest Danish League^{4}
  - Winners (1): 1964
  - Group 1 Winners (2): 1974^{‡}, 1976^{‡}
  - Group 1 Runners-up (1): 2010–11

==== Regional leagues ====
- Københavnsserien^{5}
  - Winners (3): 1983^{‡}, 1994^{‡}, 2009–10
  - Reserve League Winners (3): 1949–50^{‡}, 1950–51^{‡}, 1973^{‡}
  - Reserve League Runners-up (2): 1948–49^{‡}, 1967^{‡}
- KBUs A-række^{6}
  - Winners (2): 1924–25, 1925–26
  - Runners-up (2): 1929–30, 1935–36
- KBUs Deltagerturnering^{7}
  - Winners (1): 1920–21
- ABUs Amager-Mesterskabsturnering
  - Runners-up (2): 1912, 1915–16

==== Cups ====
- DBU Pokalen
  - Runners-up (1): 1971–72
- KBUs Pokalturnering
  - Winners (1): 1952
  - Runners-up (1): 1933
- KBUs Sommerpokalturnering
  - Runners-up (1): 1936
- Fælledklubbernes Pokalturnering
  - Winners (1): 1924
- Forstadsklubbernes Pokalturnering
  - Winners (3): 1926, 1927, 1929
  - Runners-up (1): 1928
- ABUs/Amagerklubbernes Pokalturnering
  - Winners (2): 1922, 1930
  - Runners-up (3): 1927, 1928, 1932

- ^{‡}: Honour achieved by the reserve team.
- ^{1}: Level 1: Danmarksmesterskabsturneringen (1927–1929), Mesterskabsserien (1929–1940), Danmarksturneringen (1940–1945), 1. division (1945–1990), Superligaen (1991–present)
- ^{2}: Level 2: Oprykningsserien (1929–1936), II. Serie (1936–1940), 2. division (1945–1990), Kvalifikationsligaen (1992s, 1993s, 1994s, 1995s), 1. division (1991–present)
- ^{3}: Level 3: III. Serie (1936–1940), 3. division (1945–1990), 2. division (1991–present)
- ^{4}: Level 4: Kvalifikationsturneringen (1946–1965), Kvalifikationsrækken (1996–2000), Danmarksserien for herrer (1966–present)
- ^{5}: Level 5 (Level 1 under DBU Copenhagen): KBUs Mesterskabsrække (1920–1936), KBUs A-række (1936–1947), Københavnsserien A / Københavnsserien B (1947–1977), Københavnsserien (1978–present)
- ^{6}: Level 6 (Level 2 under DBU Copenhagen): KBUs A-række (1920–1936), KBUs B-række (1936–1947), KBUs Mellemrække (1947–1984), KBUs Serie 1 (1985–2011), DBU København Serie 1 (2011–present)
- ^{7}: Level 7 (Level 3 under DBU Copenhagen): KBUs Deltagerturnering & KBUs Forstadsturnering (1920–21), KBUs B-række (1921–1936), KBUs C-række (1944–1947), KBUs A-række (1947–1984), KBUs Serie 2 (1985–2011), DBU København Serie 2 (2011–present)

=== European ===
- UEFA Cup Winners' Cup:
  - First round (1): 1972–73

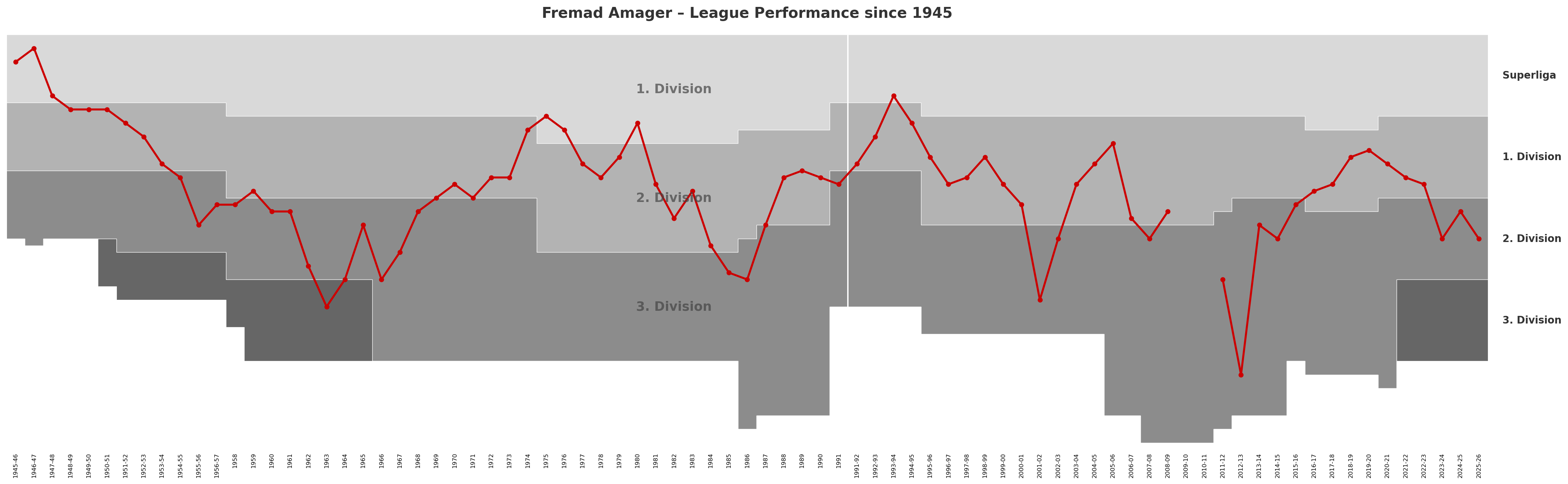

== Achievements ==
In 1912, two years after the club's formation, the club joined Amager Boldspil-Union (ABU) and later also participated in tournaments organized by Københavns Forstadsklubbers Boldspil Union (KFBU). The club became an extraordinary member of the Copenhagen Football Association (KBU) in 1920 and a full member in 1921, enabling the club to participate in the leagues organized by the regional organization, between 1920 and 1927, but did not qualify for the national championship play-offs, Landsfodboldturneringen. Since 1927, Fremad Amager have primarily played in the top three tiers of the Danish football league system with the exception of four seasons during two periods (1963–1964 and 2009/10–2010/11). Due to the league structures, between the 1927–28 and 1935–36 seasons, the club was made to play in both a national and regional league, which is reflected in the overview below.

- 19.5 seasons in the Highest Danish League
- 41.5 seasons in the Second Highest Danish League
- 26 seasons in the Third Highest Danish League
- 3 seasons in the Fourth Highest Danish League
- 9 season^{R} in the Fifth Highest Danish League
- 7 seasons^{R} in the Sixth Highest Danish League
- 1 season^{R} in the Seventh Highest Danish League
- Overview has been updated to include the 2019–20 season. A season is one year long.
- ^{R}: The overview details all seasons played under both the Danish FA and the Copenhagen FA since 1920, and distinguishes between participation in regional and national leagues, converted into the current situation in the Danish football league system.
