= 2014–15 Reading F.C. season =

Reading F.C.
2014–15 season
- Chairman: Sir John Madejski
- Manager: Nigel Adkins (until 15 December); Steve Clarke (from 16 December)
- Stadium: Madejski Stadium
- Championship: 19th
- FA Cup: Semi-final (eliminated by Arsenal)
- League Cup: Third round (eliminated by Derby County)
- Top goalscorer: League: Simon Cox; Glenn Murray (8); All: Simon Cox; Glenn Murray; Pavel Pogrebnyak (8)
- Highest home attendance: 20,048 vs Brentford (25 April 2015)
- Lowest home attendance: 13,775 vs Rotherham United (4 November 2014)
- Average home league attendance: League, 17,022; All, 16,835 (End of Season)
Home colours	Away colours

The 2014–15 season is Reading Football Club's second season in the Championship following the side's relegation from the Premier League at the end of the 2012–13 season. The season began with Nigel Adkins as manager; he was replaced by Steve Clarke in December.

== Season review ==
=== Pre-season ===
On 6 May, Reading announced that five players would be leaving upon the expiry of their contracts. Those departing were Stuart Taylor, Kaspars Gorkšs, Wayne Bridge, Mikele Leigertwood and club captain Jobi McAnuff. Youngsters Lawson D'Ath, Nick Arnold, Gozie Ugwu, Matt Partridge and Shepherd Murombedzi were also released whilst contract talks were taking place with Michael Hector, Jake Taylor and 18 other youth players. On 30 May youngsters Michael Hector and Jake Taylor signed new two-year contracts with the option of a third.

On 2 June, Sir John Madejski announced that the club was looking for new ownership and that Anton Zingarevich, Christopher Samuelson and Andrew Obolensky had left the board of Directors.

==== Transfers ====
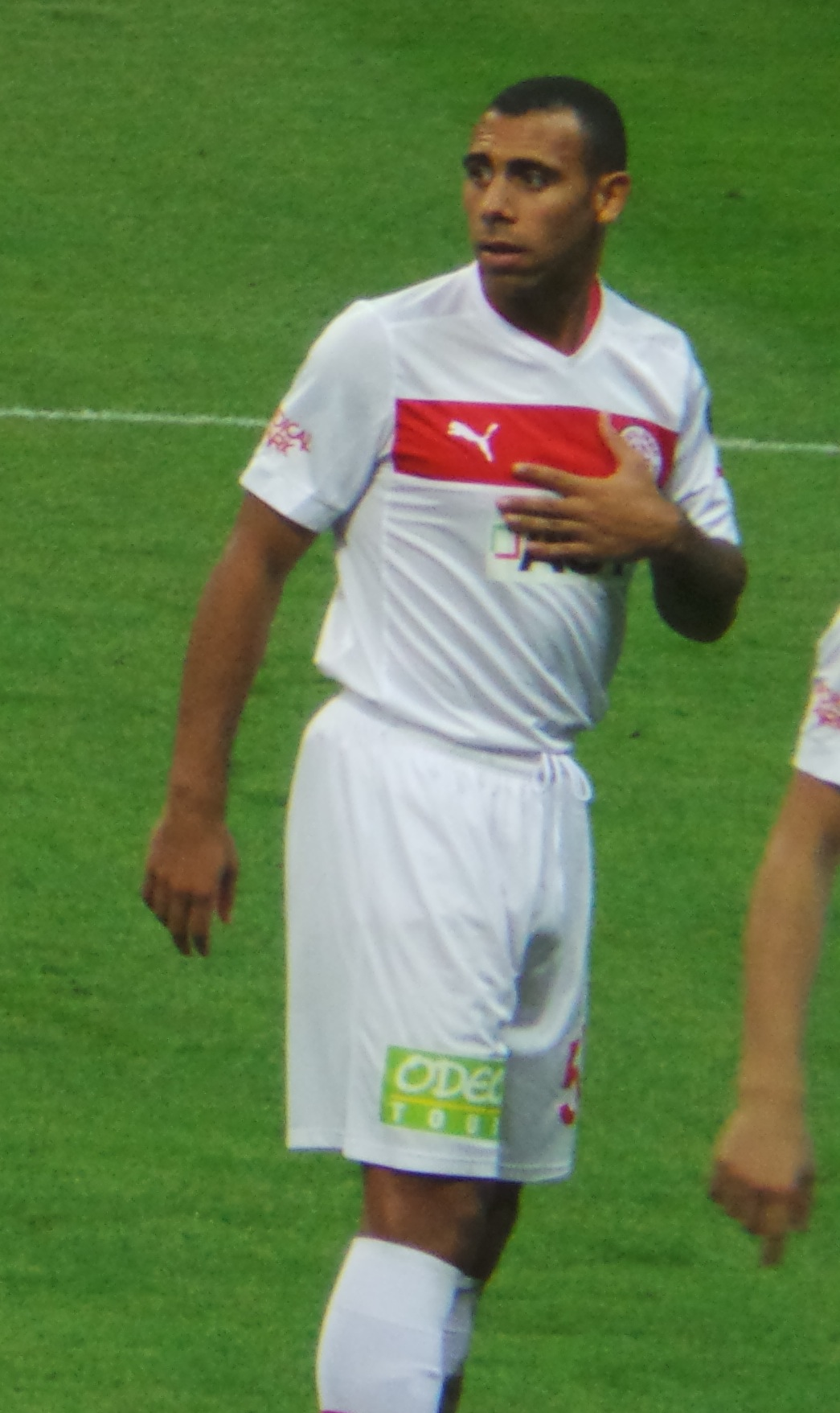
Ferdinand signed a two-year contract in August 2014, pictured playing for Antalyaspor in 2013

Readings first addition of the season was the signing of USA U-18 international Andrija Novakovich to their academy from USM. On 7 August 2014, Simon Cox resigned for Reading, 6 years after he left the club, on a two-year contract from Nottingham Forest. The following day Jamie Mackie signed on a season-long loan deal, also from Nottingham Forest. On 11 August 2014, Reading confirmed the signing of Anton Ferdinand on a two-year contract. Reading made their fourth permanent signing of the season on 21 August, signing Oliver Norwood to a three-year contract from Huddersfield Town. On 1 September 2014, transfer deadline day, Reading signed Glenn Murray on loan from Crystal Palace until 1 January, with a view to a permanent move.

On 28 May 2014 Adam Le Fondre moved to Cardiff City for an undisclosed fee, with Daniel Carriço following Le Fondre out of the club on 23 June 2014 after making his move to Sevilla permanent. On 7 August 2014, Reading's three young goalkeepers left on loan, Stuart Moore joined Basingstoke Town on a season long loan with Jonathan Henly also joining Basingstoke as cover for Moore, whilst George Legg joined Hendon on a months loan. On 15 August, Sean Morrison followed le Fondre to Cardiff City. On 29 August 2014, Alex McCarthy completed his move to QPR. On transfer deadline day, Royston Drenthe joined Sheffield Wednesday on loan until 2 January 2015.

=== August ===
Reading started their season on 9 August with a 2–2 away draw at Wigan Athletic, with Shaun Cummings and Sean Morrison getting Reading's goals after Callum McManaman opened the scoring for Wigan and James McArthur scored a 93rd-minute equaliser. Three days later, on 12 August, Reading faced Newport County in the League Cup at home. Reading ran out 3–1 winners, with their goals coming from Pavel Pogrebnyak, Nick Blackman and debutante Craig Tanner. Reading won their next game, on 16 August, against Ipswich Town thanks to a Jake Taylor goal, before losing their next two games, 2–1 at home to Huddersfield Town and 4–0 away to Nottingham Forest. Reading finished August with back to back wins, 1–0 away to Scunthorpe United in the second round of the League Cup, Jake Taylor scoring, and 1–0 away to Middlesbrough with Simon Cox scoring.

=== September ===
On 11 September, Legg extended his loan with Hendon for another month, whilst on 12 September, Jonathan Henly moved to Welling United on loan until 1 January 2015. The following day, 13 September, Reading faced Fulham at home, winning 3–0 thanks to a brace from Glenn Murray and the third from Nick Blackman. Reading won their fourth game in a row on 16 September, 3–2 at home to Millwall, with a double strike from Simon Cox and another from Nick Blackman. 20 September saw Reading travel to Hillsborough to face Sheffield Wednesday, with the game ending in disappointment for Reading as they fell to a 1–0 defeat courtesy of a late Stevie May goal. On 22 September, Reading announced the completion of the sale of the club to a Thai consortium, with Sir John Madejski staying on as Co-Chairman. The following day, 23 September, Reading suffered their second defeat in four days, as they went out of the League Cup with a 2–0 defeat to Derby County. Reading ended September with a 3–3 home draw against Wolverhampton Wanderers, with the Reading goals coming from Michael Hector, Jake Taylor and Glenn Murray, whilst Nick Blackman was unfortunate to score an own goal.

=== October ===
Reading started October with a 0–0 draw away to Leeds United on 1 October, following it up three days later with a 3–1 away defeat to Brentford in which Simon Cox scored the only goal for Reading. On 3 October, Garath McCleary signed a new contract with the club until the summer of 2017. Following the International break, Reading suffered their second and third defeats in a row, both 3–0, at home to Derby County on 18 October and away to Bournemouth on 21 October. Reading finished October with their first win in seven games, a 3–0 home win over Blackpool, with Glenn Murray and Nick Blackman scoring either side of a Peter Clarke own goal.

=== November ===
Reading started November with a 3–1 away defeat to Blackburn Rovers on 1 November, Glenn Murray scoring their only goal, before following it up three days later with a 3–0 victory over Rotherham United thanks to Jamie Mackie and a Simon Cox double. On 8 November Reading suffered a 1–0 home defeat to Charlton Athletic, before a 2–1 away defeat to Cardiff City on 21 November. Michael Hector scored Readings only goal late on, whilst Alex Pearce had a nightmare evening, conceding an own goal before being shown a straight red card on the stroke of half-time. Reading ended the month with a 2–1 away win over Norwich City, Gary Hooper put Norwich ahead after 10 minutes before Jake Cooper scored his first ever goal for Reading in the 14th minute and his second in the 44th to give Reading all three points.

Also during November, Slovenian defender Jure Travner joined the club on trial from Azerbaijan Premier League side FK Baku.

=== December ===
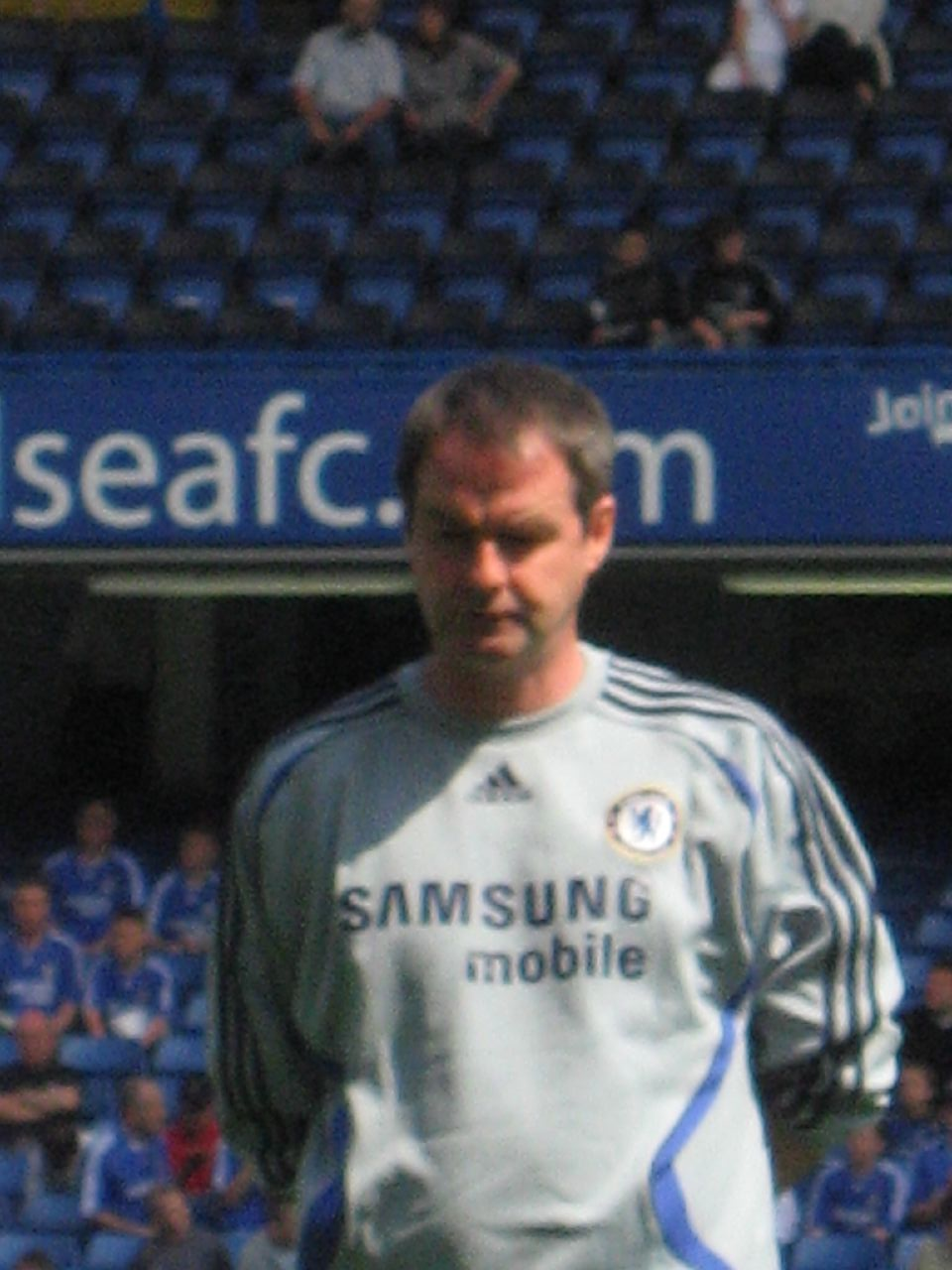
Steve Clarke was appointed as the club's manager on 16 December.

Reading started the month with a 0–0 home draw against Bolton Wanderers on 6 December, before a 6–1 away defeat to Birmingham City on 13 December. Following the club's 6–1 defeat to Birmingham City, manager Nigel Adkins was sacked by the club on 15 December. The following day Reading appointed Steve Clarke on a 2 1/2-year contract.

Reading lost their first game with Steve Clarke as manager, a 1–0 home defeat to 10-man Watford on 20 December. They followed this defeat up with a 2–2 away draw to Manager-less Brighton & Hove Albion on 26 December, Glenn Murray scoring both the goals, before a 2–1 home win over Norwich City on 28 December thanks to Simon Cox and a Hal Robson-Kanu penalty.

Murray returned to Crystal Palace on 31 December following the completion of his loan deal.

=== January ===
On 2 January 2015, Aaron Tshibola moved to Hartlepool United on a one-month loan deal, whilst Jonathan Henly returned from his loan at Welling United and Royston Drenthe returned to the club following his loan to Sheffield Wednesday to discuss his future. The following day, Nick Blackman scored Reading's only goal in their 1–0 away win over Huddersfield Town in the third round of the FA Cup, setting up a fourth round trip to Cardiff City. On 10 January Reading drew 0–0 at home to Middlesbrough, in a game that saw Jem Karacan make his return from a long term knee-injury, coming on as an 86th-minute substitute for Jamie Mackie. Defender Shaun Cummings left the club on 12 January, moving to Millwall two days later for an undisclosed fee. Reading lost their next game, a 2–1 away defeat to Fulham on 17 January, with Pavel Pogrebnyak scoring Reading's only goal. The following week Polish International goalkeeper, Jakub Słowik, joined the club on a week-long trial. On 22 January, Reading signed Jure Travner on a contract with the club till the end of the season, and Nathaniel Chalobah on loan till the end of the season from Chelsea, whilst youngster Craig Tanner signed a new contract till the summer of 2017 and joined AFC Wimbledon on a season-long youth loan. The next day Royston Drenthe left club, signing for Kayseri Erciyesspor of the Turkish Süper Lig on a permanent basis. 24 January saw Reading take on Cardiff City in the fourth round of the FA Cup, with Reading winning the games 2–1 at the Cardiff City Stadium. Cardiff took the lead through Kenwyne Jones in the first half before Oliver Norwood and Hal Robson-Kanu in the second half to send Reading into the fifth round.

On 27 January, Reading traveled to Millwall, playing out a 0–0 draw that saw them remain in 18th position. Two days later, 29 January, Dominic Samuel joined Coventry City on an emergency loan, which will see him stay at the club until 28 April, and midfielder Aaron Tshibola extended his stay at Hartlepool United till the end of the season. Reading's last game of January was a 2–0 victory over Sheffield Wednesday, with the goals coming from Pavel Pogrebnyak and Nathaniel Chalobah.

Young Georgian defender Lasha Dvali returned to the club in January following a year-long loan deal with Latvian Higher League side Skonto FC.

=== February ===
On transfer deadline day, 2 February, Reading signed Yakubu on a contract until the end of the season, whilst Georgian defender Lasha Dvali joined Turkish Süper Lig side Kasımpaşa on loan till the end of the season. Youngster Dominic Hyam left the club on a one-month youth loan deal on 4 February, joining Hemel Hempstead Town. On 7 February Reading traveled to Wolverhampton Wanderers, winning 2–1 after goals from Pavel Pogrebnyak and Danny Williams. Three days later, Reading hosted Leeds United in a game that the visitors won 2–0. On 14 February Reading defeated Derby County 2–1 in the fifth round of the FA Cup, before losing 0–1 at home to Wigan Athletic three days later. On 21 February Reading registered another away win, winning 1–0 away to Ipswich Town thanks to a 14th-minute goal by Jamie Mackie, before falling to defeat against Huddersfield Town 3–0 three days later.

=== March ===
On 3 March Reading drew 1–1 away to Bolton, with Jamie Mackie scoring the equaliser in the third and final minute of stoppage time. On 7 March Reading played their FA Cup quarter final match against League One team Bradford City, drawing 0–0 at Valley Parade. The draw resulted in a home replay, scheduled for 16 March. On 10 March Reading hosted Brighton & Hove Albion in a 2–1 victory with both goals being scored by Jamie Mackie. Defender Niall Keown made his debut during the game, coming on as a late substitute for Danny Williams, the winning goal coming minutes after Chris O'Grady scored a penalty for the away team. On 12 March, Zat Knight signed a short-term contract until the end of the season. Reading lost their next Championship game 4–1, away to Watford on 14 March, before defeating Bradford City 3–0 in their FA Cup Quarter Final Replay to set up a Semi Final against Arsenal. On 18 March youngster George McLennan joined Hayes & Yeading United on loan till the end of the season. On 24 March young goalkeeper Dan Lincoln joined Nuneaton Town on a seven-day loan deal, with Nathan Aké joining Reading on an initial one-month loan a day later, before Kwesi Appiah joined on loan until the end of the season and Jake Taylor and Danny Guthrie left the club on loan till the end of the season, to Leyton Orient and Fulham respectively on 26 March. On 27 March, Reading exercised an option in Chris Gunter's contract to keep the player for another year.

On 30 March, Reading where fined £30,000 by The Football League for breaching the Football League regulations that prohibit any individual or legal entity having an interest in more than one club, when they borrowed an initial £10.5m from Vibrac Corporation in August 2013, and a further £5.6m in May 2014.

=== April ===
Reading started April with a 1–1 home draw against Cardiff City on 4 April, Pavel Pogrebnyak gave Reading an early lead, before Conor McAleny scored a 90th-minute equaliser. Reading drew their second game in a row on 7 April, away to Blackpool. Jamie O'Hara gave Blackpool an early lead from the penalty spot, after a Zat Knight shirt pull, with a Grant Hall own goal just after half-time leveling the teams. On 11 April Reading played Blackburn Rovers in a one-off kit design, designed by a young fan Ryan Duval. The game ended 0–0, the third Reading draw in a row, and also marked the first start for Jem Karacan in over a year and a half. Reading suffered their first defeat of the month on 14 April, 1–0 at home to Bournemouth. Reading's away game with Rotherham United on 18 April was postponed until 28 April, due to Reading's FA Cup Semi-Final tie with Arsenal. Alexis Sánchez gave Arsenal the lead shortly before halftime, with Garath McCleary equalising in the 54th minute to level the game and take the match to extra-time. Sánchez scored his second of the game, and the winner, on the stroke of half-time in extra time, after his weak shot was spilled over the line by Adam Federici. Reading's next game was at home to Birmingham City on 22 April, which Reading lost 1–0 to a late Clayton Donaldson goal. This was also Nathan Aké's last game for Reading as he returned to Chelsea following the game. On 25 April, Reading hosted Brentford in their last home game of the season. Reading went down 2–0 after goals from Alan Judge and James Tarkowski. After the game Adam Federici was named the clubs Player of the Season. Reading's last game of April was their rearranged game away to Rotherham United on 28 April. Reading lost the match, their fifth in a row, 2–1 with Matt Derbyshire and Lee Frecklington scoring a quick-fire double in the second half before a late Oliver Norwood goal gave Reading their consolation goal.

=== May ===
Reading won their final game of the season, and first since 10 March, on 2 May away to Derby County 3–0. Kwesi Appiah opened the scoring in the second minute, his first for the club, before Michael Hector scored the second midway through the second half and a late Garath McCleary penalty sealed the victory.

On 21 May Reading released senior players Zat Knight, Jure Travner, Danny Guthrie, Ryan Edwards and Yakubu. Whilst youth players Daniel Lincoln, Jonathan Henly, Aleksandar Gogic, and George McLennan also left the club.

== Transfers ==
=== In ===
Date	Position	Nationality	Name	From	Fee	Ref.
7 April 2014†	FW	(United States)	Andrija Novakovich	Chicago Magic	Free	
7 August 2014	FW	(Republic of Ireland)	Simon Cox	Nottingham Forest	Undisclosed	
11 August 2014	DF	(England)	Anton Ferdinand	Antalyaspor	Free	
21 August 2014	MF	(Northern Ireland)	Oliver Norwood	Huddersfield Town	Undisclosed	
22 January 2015	DF	(Slovenia)	Jure Travner	FK Baku	Free	
2 February 2015	FW	(Nigeria)	Yakubu	Al Rayyan	Free	
12 March 2015	DF	(England)	Zat Knight	Colorado Rapids	Free	

† Novakovich's transfer was announced on the above date but were not finalised until 1 July.

=== Loans in ===
Start date	Position	Nationality	Name	From	End date	Ref.
8 August 2014	FW	(Scotland)	Jamie Mackie	Nottingham Forest	Season-long	
1 September 2014	FW	(England)	Glenn Murray	Crystal Palace	1 January 2015	
22 January 2015	MF	(England)	Nathaniel Chalobah	Chelsea	End of season	
25 March 2015	DF	(Netherlands)	Nathan Aké	Chelsea	22 April 2015	
26 March 2015	FW	(Ghana)	Kwesi Appiah	Crystal Palace	End of season	

=== Out ===
Date	Position	Nationality	Name	To	Fee	Ref.
28 May 2014	FW	(England)	Adam Le Fondre	(Wales) Cardiff City	Undisclosed	
23 June 2014	MF	(Portugal)	Daniel Carriço	Sevilla	Undisclosed	
15 August 2014	DF	(England)	Sean Morrison	Cardiff City	Undisclosed	
29 August 2014	GK	(England)	Alex McCarthy	Queens Park Rangers	Undisclosed	
12 January 2015	DF	(Jamaica)	Shaun Cummings	Millwall	Undisclosed	
23 January 2015	MF	(Netherlands)	Royston Drenthe	Kayseri Erciyesspor	Undisclosed	

=== Loans out ===
Start date	Position	Nationality	Name	To	End date	Ref.
7 August 2014	GK	(England)	Stuart Moore	Basingstoke Town	Season-long	
7 August 2014	GK	(Scotland)	Jonathan Henly	Basingstoke Town	7 September 2014	
7 August 2014	GK	(England)	George Legg	Hendon	7 October 2014	
1 September 2014	MF	(Netherlands)	Royston Drenthe	Sheffield Wednesday	2 January 2015	
12 September 2014	GK	(Scotland)	Jonathan Henly	Welling United	End-of-season	
10 October 2014	GK	(England)	Lewis Ward	Whitehawk	7 November 2014	
24 December 2014	DF	(England)	Robert Dickie	Basingstoke Town	25 April 2015	
2 January 2015	MF	(England)	Aaron Tshibola	Hartlepool United	Season-long youth loan	
22 January 2015	FW	(England)	Craig Tanner	AFC Wimbledon	Season-long youth loan	
29 January 2015	FW	(England)	Dominic Samuel	Coventry City	28 April 2015	
2 February 2015	DF	(Georgia (country))	Lasha Dvali	Kasımpaşa	End-of-season	
4 February 2015	DF	(Scotland)	Dominic Hyam	Hemel Hempstead Town	4 March 2015	
18 March 2015	DF	(Scotland)	George McLennan	Hayes & Yeading United	End-of-season	
24 March 2015	GK	(England)	Dan Lincoln	Nuneaton Town	31 March 2015	
26 March 2015	MF	(Wales)	Jake Taylor	Leyton Orient	End of season	
26 March 2015	MF	(England)	Danny Guthrie	Fulham	End of season	

=== Released ===
Date	Position	Nationality	Name	Joined	Date	Ref
21 May 2015	GK	(Denmark)	Mikkel Andersen	Midtjylland	25 June 2015	
21 May 2015	GK	(England)	Daniel Lincoln	Hayes & Yeading United	18 August 2015	
21 May 2015	GK	(Scotland)	Jonathan Henly	Ipswich Town	20 August 2015	
21 May 2015	GK	(United States)	Aleksandar Gogić	Nike Academy		
21 May 2015	DF	(England)	Zat Knight	Retired		
21 May 2015	DF	(Slovenia)	Jure Travner	Celje	15 July 2015	
21 May 2015	DF	(Scotland)	George McLennan	Cheltenham Town	7 July 2015	
21 May 2015	MF	(England)	Danny Guthrie	Blackburn Rovers	4 August 2015	
21 May 2015	MF	(Australia)	Ryan Edwards	Partick Thistle	24 September 2015	
21 May 2015	FW	(Nigeria)	Yakubu	Kayserispor	31 August 2015	
27 May 2015	GK	(Australia)	Adam Federici	Bournemouth	1 July 2015	
8 June 2015	DF	(Republic of Ireland)	Alex Pearce	Derby County	1 July 2015	
30 June 2015	DF	(Republic of Ireland)	Stephen Kelly	Rotherham United	19 November 2015	
30 June 2015	MF	(Turkey)	Jem Karacan	Galatasaray	8 July 2015	

=== Trial ===
Date from	Position	Nationality	Name	Last club	Date to	Ref.
November 2014	DF	(Slovakia)	Jure Travner	FK Baku	22 January 2015	
19 January 2015	GK	(Poland)	Jakub Słowik	Jagiellonia Białystok	23 January 2015	

== Squad ==
As of match played 2 May 2015

No.	Name	Nationality	Position	Date of birth (Age (Note: Age as of the end of the season))	Signed from	Signed in	Contract ends	Apps.	Goals
Goalkeepers
1	Adam Federici	(Australia)	GK	31 January 1985 (aged 30)	Torres	2005	2015	245	1
31	Mikkel Andersen	(Denmark)	GK	17 December 1988 (aged 26)	AB Copenhagen	2007	2015	5	0
40	Stuart Moore	(England)	GK	8 September 1994 (aged 20)	Academy	2013		0	0
41	Daniel Lincoln	(England)	GK	26 May 1995 (aged 19)	Academy	2013		0	0
42	Jonathan Henly (Note: Henly was born in Woking, England, but qualified to represent Scotland internationally through his mother, making his international debut for the Scottish U-19 side in May 2013.)	(Scotland)	GK	7 June 1994 (aged 20)	Academy	2012	2015	0	0
Defenders
2	Chris Gunter	(Wales)	RB	21 July 1989 (aged 25)	Nottingham Forest	2012	2016	114	1
3	Stephen Kelly	(Republic of Ireland)	RB	6 September 1983 (aged 31)	Fulham	2013	2015	52	1
4	Anton Ferdinand	(England)	CB	18 February 1985 (aged 30)	Antalyaspor	2014	2016	2	0
5	Alex Pearce (Note: Pearce was born in Oxford, England, but qualified to represent Scotland and the Republic of Ireland internationally through his parents and made his international debut for the Scottish U-21 side in May 2008, then went on to represent Ireland at full international level on 11 September 2012.)	(Republic of Ireland)	CB	9 November 1988 (aged 26)	Academy	2006	2015	240	15
15	Michael Hector (Note: Hector was born in East Ham, England, but qualified to represent Jamaica and made his international debut for Jamaica in June 2015.)	(England)	CB	19 July 1992 (aged 22)	Academy	2010	2016	58	3
24	Zat Knight	(England)	CB	2 May 1980 (aged 35)	Colorado Rapids	2015	2015	2	0
26	Pierce Sweeney	(Republic of Ireland)	CB	11 September 1994 (aged 20)	Bray Wanderers	2012		0	0
29	Jure Travner	(Slovenia)	LB	28 September 1985 (aged 29)	FK Baku	2015	2015	1	0
32	Sean Long	(Republic of Ireland)	RB	2 April 1995 (aged 20)	Academy	2013	2016	1	0
33	Shane Griffin	(Republic of Ireland)	LB	8 September 1994 (aged 20)	Academy	2013	2016	0	0
34	Niall Keown	(England)	RB	5 April 1995 (aged 20)	Academy	2013		2	0
35	Jake Cooper	(England)	CB	3 February 1995 (aged 20)	Academy	2013	2016	19	2
	Robert Dickie	(England)	DF	3 March 1996 (aged 19)	Academy	2014		0	0
	Dominic Hyam	(Scotland)	DF	20 December 1995 (aged 19)	Academy	2014	2016	0	0
	George McLennan	(Scotland)	DF	10 December 1995 (aged 19)	Academy	2014		0	0
	Nana Owusu	(England)	DF	27 February 1996 (aged 19)	Academy	2014	2016	0	0
	Lasha Dvali	(Georgia (country))	DF	14 May 1995 (aged 19)	Skonto	2013		0	0
Midfielders
6	Oliver Norwood	(Northern Ireland)	CM	12 April 1991 (aged 24)	Huddersfield Town	2014	2017	42	1
8	Danny Guthrie	(England)	CM	18 April 1987 (aged 28)	Newcastle United	2012	2015	69	5
9	Hal Robson-Kanu (Note: Robson-Kanu was born in Ealing, England, and represented England at U-19 and U-20 level, but also qualified to represent Wales through his grandmother and made his international debut for the Welsh U-21 side in May 2010 before making his full international debut for Wales five days later.)	(Wales)	LW	21 May 1989 (aged 25)	Academy	2007	2016	192	25
11	Jordan Obita	(England) (Note: Obita was born in Oxford, England, but qualified to represent Uganda and made his international debut for Uganda in June 2025.)	MF	8 December 1993 (aged 21)	Academy	2010	2017	88	1
12	Garath McCleary (Note: McCleary was born in Oxford, England, but qualified to represent Jamaica and made his international debut for Jamaica in February 2013.)	(Jamaica)	RW	15 May 1987 (aged 27)	Nottingham Forest	2012	2017	110	12
14	Nathaniel Chalobah (Note: Chalobah was born in Freetown, Sierra Leone, but qualified to represent England through residency, representing England at U-16 to U-21.)	(England)	CM	12 December 1994 (aged 20)	loan from Chelsea	2015	2015	20	1
16	Hope Akpan (Note: Akpan was born in Liverpool, England, but qualified to represent Nigeria through his parents, making his international debut for Nigeria in October 2014.)	(Nigeria)	CM	14 August 1991 (aged 23)	Crawley Town	2013	2016	63	1
17	Ryan Edwards	(Australia)	MF	17 November 1993 (aged 21)	Australian Institute of Sport	2011	2015	10	0
18	Aaron Tshibola	(England) (Note: Tshibola was born in Beckton, England, but qualified to represent Democratic Republic of the Congo and made his international debut for DR Congo in March 2018.)	CM	2 January 1995 (aged 20)	Academy	2013	2016	1	0
21	Jem Karacan (Note: Karacan was born in Lewisham, England, but also qualifies to represent Turkey internationally through his father and has represented Turkey at every youth level.)	(Turkey)	CM	21 February 1989 (aged 26)	Academy	2007	2015	175	12
23	Danny Williams (Note: Williams was born in Karlsruhe, Germany, and represented Germany at U-15 level. Williams also qualified to play for the United States through his parents, and made his debut for them in October 2011.)	(United States)	CM	8 March 1989 (aged 26)	Hoffenheim	2013	2017	63	4
25	Jake Taylor (Note: Taylor was born in Ascot, England, and but chose to represent Wales, qualifying through his grandfather who has born in Barry. Taylor has represented Wales at U-17, U-19 and U-21 level.)	(Wales)	MF	1 December 1991 (aged 23)	Academy	2009	2016	36	3
28	Aaron Kuhl	(England)	MF	30 January 1996 (aged 19)	Academy	2014	2016	8	0
37	Jack Stacey	(England)	MF	6 April 1996 (aged 19)	Academy	2014	2016	6	0
38	Liam Kelly	(Republic of Ireland)	MF	22 November 1995 (aged 19)	Academy	2014	2016	0	0
39	Tarique Fosu	(England)	MF	5 November 1995 (aged 19)	Academy	2014		1	0
	Conor Shaughnessy	(Republic of Ireland)	MF	30 June 1996 (aged 18)	Academy	2014		0	0
	Samúel Friðjónsson	(Iceland)	MF	22 February 1996 (aged 19)	Academy	2013	2015	0	0
Forwards
7	Pavel Pogrebnyak	(Russia)	FW	8 November 1983 (aged 31)	Fulham	2012	2016	108	29
10	Simon Cox (Note: Cox was born in Reading, England, but qualified to represent Republic of Ireland internationally through his grandmother and made his international debut for Republic of Ireland on 24 May 2011.)	(Republic of Ireland)	FW	28 April 1987 (aged 28)	Nottingham Forest	2014	2016	52	8
19	Jamie Mackie (Note: Mackie was born in Dorking, England, but qualified to represent Scotland internationally through his grandfather and made his international debut for Scotland on 8 October 2010.)	(Scotland)	FW	22 September 1985 (aged 29)	Loan from Nottingham Forest	2014	2015	39	6
20	Yakubu	(Nigeria)	FW	22 November 1982 (aged 32)	Al Rayyan	2015	2015	11	1
22	Nick Blackman	(England)	FW	11 November 1989 (aged 25)	Sheffield United	2013	2016	84	9
27	Craig Tanner	(England)	FW	27 October 1994 (aged 20)	Academy	2013	2017	5	1
30	Dominic Samuel	(England)	FW	1 April 1994 (aged 21)	Academy	2012		2	0
36	Andrija Novakovich	(United States)	FW	21 September 1996 (aged 18)	University School of Milwaukee	2014		2	0
44	Kwesi Appiah	(Ghana)	FW	12 September 1990 (aged 24)	loan from Crystal Palace	2015	2015	6	1

=== Left club during season ===
Note: Flags indicate national team as defined under FIFA eligibility rules; some limited exceptions apply. Players may hold more than one non-FIFA nationality.

No.	Pos.	Nation	Player
6	DF	ENG	Sean Morrison (to Cardiff City)
20	GK	ENG	Alex McCarthy (to Queens Park Rangers)
20	FW	ENG	Glenn Murray (returned to Crystal Palace after loan)

No.	Pos.	Nation	Player
24	DF	JAM	Shaun Cummings (to Millwall)
43	DF	NED	Nathan Aké (returned to Chelsea after loan)
—	MF	NED	Royston Drenthe (to Kayseri Erciyesspor)

== Pre-season ==
15 July 2014	Exeter City	0–1	Reading	Exeter
19:30 BST		Report	Edwards 8'	Stadium: St James Park; Attendance: 1,211; Referee: Andy Woolmer

19 July 2014	Yeovil Town	1–1	Reading	Yeovil
15:00 BST	Trialist 71'	Report	Pogrebnyak 48'	Stadium: Huish Park; Attendance: 1,153

26 July 2014	Wycombe Wanderers	0–2	Reading	High Wycombe, England
15:00 BST		Report	Pogrebnyak 40'; Taylor 75'	Stadium: Adams Park; Attendance: 1,697

29 July 2014	Stevenage	0–0	Reading	Stevenage, England
19:30 BST		Report		Stadium: The Lamex Stadium

2 August 2014	Reading	1–3	(Wales) Swansea City	Reading, England
15:00 BST	Blackman 43'	Report	Routledge 23', 25'; Gomis 65'	Stadium: Madejski Stadium; Attendance: 5,421; Referee: Andy Davies

== Competitions ==
Competition	Started round	Current position / round	Final position / round	First match	Last match
2014–15 Championship	—	—	19	9 August 2014	2 May 2015
League Cup	First round	—	Fifth round	12 August 2013	23 September 2014
FA Cup	Third round	—	Semi-finals	3 January 2015	18 April 2015

Updated to match played 2014
Source: Competitions

=== Championship ===
==== League table ====
Pos	Team	Pld	W	D	L	GF	GA	GD	Pts
17	Fulham	46	14	10	22	62	83	−21	52
18	Bolton Wanderers	46	13	12	21	54	67	−13	51
19	Reading	46	13	11	22	48	69	−21	50
20	Brighton & Hove Albion	46	10	17	19	44	54	−10	47
21	Rotherham United	46	11	16	19	46	67	−21	46 (Note: Rotherham United were deducted three points for fielding an ineligible player.)

Updated to match(es) played on 2 May 2015. Source: Sky Sports
Rules for classification: 1) Points; 2) Goal difference; 3) Number of goals scored

==== Results summary ====
Overall								Home						Away					
Pld	W	D	L	GF	GA	GD	Pts	W	D	L	GF	GA	GD	W	D	L	GF	GA	GD
46	13	11	22	48	68	−20	50	8	5	10	24	24	0	5	6	12	24	44	−20

Last updated: 2 May 2015.
Source: Reading FC

==== Results by matchday ====
Round	1	2	3	4	5	6	7	8	9	10	11	12	13	14	15	16	17	18	19	20	21	22	23	24	25	26	27	28	29	30	31	32	33	34	35	36	37	38	39	40	41	42	43	44	45	46
Ground	A	H	H	A	A	H	H	A	H	A	A	H	A	H	A	H	H	A	A	H	A	H	A	H	H	A	A	H	A	H	H	A	A	H	A	H	A	A	H	A	H	H	H	H	A	A
Result	D	W	L	L	W	W	W	L	D	D	L	L	L	W	L	W	L	L	W	D	L	L	D	W	D	L	D	W	W	L	L	W	L	L	D	W	L	L	D	D	D	L	L	L	L	W
Position	9	7	11	19	15	9	6	10	11	10	13	16	17	14	15	13	14	14	14	14	16	17	17	16	17	18	18	16	13	14	17	13	15	18	18	16	17	19	19	18	18	18	19	19	19	19

Updated to match(es) played on 2 May 2015. Source: BBC Sport
A = Away; H = Home; W = Win; D = Draw; L = Loss

==== Matches ====
9 August 2014 1	Wigan Athletic	2–2	Reading	Wigan
15:00 BST (UTC+1)	McManaman 27'; Taylor (yellow card) 74'; McArthur 90+3'	BBC Sport; Reading F.C.	Cummings (yellow card) 58' (goal) 71'; Morrison 77'	Stadium: DW Stadium; Attendance: 12,174; Referee: Mark Brown

16 August 2014 2	Reading	1–0	Ipswich Town	Reading
15:00 BST (UTC+1)	Taylor 26'; Cox (yellow card) 60'; Hector (yellow card) 81'	BBC; Reading F.C.	Berra (yellow card) 39'; Mings (yellow card) 60'; Smith (yellow card) 73'	Stadium: Madejski Stadium; Attendance: 17,198; Referee: Simon Hooper

19 August 2014 3	Reading	1–2	Huddersfield Town	Reading
20:00 BST (UTC+1)	Pearce (yellow card) 42'; Pogrebnyak (yellow card) 76'; Cox 79'	BBC; Reading F.C.	Butterfield 10'; Coady (yellow card) 35'; Bunn 38'	Stadium: Madejski Stadium; Attendance: 15,035; Referee: Stuart Attwell

23 August 2014 4	Nottingham Forest	4–0	Reading	Nottingham
15:00 BST (UTC+1)	Antonio 17', 47'; Fryatt 53'; Assombalonga 64'; Cohen (yellow card) 69'	BBC; Reading F.C.	Blackman (yellow card) 80'	Stadium: City Ground; Attendance: 22,795; Referee: Andy Woolmer

30 August 2014 5	Middlesbrough	0–1	Reading	Middlesbrough
15:00 BST (UTC+1)	Leadbitter (yellow card) 37'; Adomah (yellow card) 76'	BBC; Reading F.C.	Cox 7'; Akpan (yellow card) 68'	Stadium: Riverside Stadium; Attendance: 14,970; Referee: Darren Bond

13 September 2014 6	Reading	3–0	Fulham	Reading
15:00 BST (UTC+1)	Murray 15', 54'; Blackman 85' (yellow card) 86'	BBC; Reading F.C.	Smith (red card) 19'; Hyndman (yellow card) 25'; Voser (yellow card) 42'; Kavanagh (yellow card) 74'	Stadium: Madejski Stadium; Attendance: 18,790; Referee: Mike Jones

16 September 2014 7	Reading	3–2	Millwall	Reading
20:00 BST (UTC+1)	Cox 6', 84'; Blackman 15' (pen.)	BBC; Reading F.C.	Webster (yellow card) 14'; Fuller 39'; Beevers 54'; Upson (yellow card) 76'	Stadium: Madejski Stadium; Attendance: 15,091; Referee: Keith Hill

20 September 2014 8	Sheffield Wednesday	1–0	Reading	Sheffield
15:00 BST (UTC+1)	Coke 31'; Palmer (yellow card) 39'; Maguire (yellow card) 66'; May 83'	BBC; Reading F.C.	Blackman (yellow card) 38'; Akpan (yellow card) 63'; Cooper (yellow card) 82'	Stadium: Hillsborough Stadium; Attendance: 29,848; Referee: Mark Heywood

28 September 2014 9	Reading	3–3	Wolverhampton Wanderers	Reading
13:15 BST (UTC+1)	Hector 19'; Taylor (yellow card) 45' (goal) 55'; Guthrie (yellow card) 64'; Murray 89'	BBC; Reading F.C.	Henry 51'; Evans 54'; Stearman (yellow card) 66'; Blackman 84' (o.g.); Edwards (yellow card) 90+1'	Stadium: Madejski Stadium; Attendance: 17,454; Referee: James Adcock

1 October 2014 10	Leeds United	0–0	Reading	Leeds
19:45 BST (UTC+1)	Cooper (yellow card) 65'; Bellusci (yellow card) 66'; Doukara (yellow card) 70'	BBC; Reading F.C.	Hector (yellow card) 19'; Norwood (yellow card) 80'; Pearce (yellow card) 90'; Federici (yellow card) 90+3'	Stadium: Elland Road; Attendance: 20,705; Referee: Tony Harrington

4 October 2014 11	Brentford	3–1	Reading	Brentford
15:00 BST (UTC+1)	Jota 11'; Pritchard 32'; Douglas 81'; Diagouraga (yellow card) 83'; Craig (yellow card) 87'	BBC; Reading F.C.	Cox 49' (yellow card) 79'; Kuhl (yellow card) 74'; Mackie (yellow card) 83'	Stadium: Griffin Park; Attendance: 10,776; Referee: Roger East

18 October 2014 12	Reading	0–3	Derby County	Reading
15:00 BST (UTC+1)	Hector (yellow card) 43'; Obita (yellow card) 84'	BBC; Reading F.C.	Martin 18', 79'; Ibe 38'; Whitbread (yellow card) 44'; Christie (yellow card) 65'; Eustace (yellow card) 68'; Hughes (yellow card) 77'	Stadium: Madejski Stadium; Attendance: 18,141; Referee: Darren Deadman

21 October 2014 13	Bournemouth	3–0	Reading	Bournemouth
19:45 BST (UTC+1)	Wilson 50'; Pitman 55', 64'	BBC; Reading F.C.		Stadium: Dean Court; Attendance: 8,899; Referee: Mark Haywood

25 October 2014 14	Reading	3–0	Blackpool	Reading
15:00 BST (UTC+1)	Murray 23'; Clarke 69' (o.g.); Hector (yellow card) 71'; Taylor (yellow card) 78'; Blackman 90+4' (pen.)	BBC; Reading F.C.	Perkins (yellow card) 14'; Miller (yellow card) 39'	Stadium: Madejski Stadium; Attendance: 15,625; Referee: Gavin Ward

1 November 2014 15	Blackburn Rovers	3–1	Reading	Blackburn
15:00 GMT (UTC)	Gestede 17', 68'; Marshall 55'; Evans (yellow card) 71'; Varney (yellow card) 90+6'	BBC; Reading F.C.	Murray 44'; Obita (yellow card) 52'; Akpan (yellow card) 65'; Cooper (yellow card) 79'	Stadium: Ewood Park; Attendance: Carl Boyeson; Referee: 14,237

4 November 2014 16	Reading	3–0	Rotherham United	Reading
20:00 GMT (UTC)	Mackie 29'; Cox 55', 64'; Akpan (yellow card) 71'; Gunter (yellow card) 89'	BBC; Reading F.C.	Morgan (yellow card) 44'; Árnason (yellow card) 70'	Stadium: Madejski Stadium; Attendance: 13,775; Referee: Pat Miller

8 November 2014 17	Reading	0–1	Charlton Athletic	Reading
15:00 GMT (UTC)	Cox (yellow card) 74'; Obita (yellow card) 86'	BBC; Reading F.C.	Vetokele 39'; Guðmundsson (yellow card) 88'; Jackson (yellow card) 90+3'	Stadium: Madejski Stadium; Attendance: 16,989; Referee: Neil Swarbrick

21 November 2014 18	Cardiff City	2–1	Reading	Cardiff
19:45 GMT (UTC)	Pearce 20' (o.g.); Pilkington (yellow card) 41'; Whittingham 45+4' (pen.)	BBC; Reading F.C.	Williams (yellow card) 41'; Pearce (red card) 45+3'; Hector 81'; Blackman (yellow card) 90'	Stadium: Cardiff City Stadium; Attendance: 20,643; Referee: James Linington

29 November 2014 19	Norwich City	1–2	Reading	Norwich
15:00 GMT (UTC)	Hooper 10' (yellow card) 44'; Howson (yellow card) 60'	BBC; Reading F.C.	Cooper 14', 45'; Murray (yellow card) 55'; Obita (yellow card) 82'	Stadium: Carrow Road; Attendance: 26,002; Referee: David Webb

6 December 2014 20	Reading	0–0	Bolton Wanderers	Reading
15:00 GMT (UTC)	Norwood (yellow card) 61'; Murray (yellow card) 73'; Obita (yellow card) 82'	BBC; Reading F.C.		Stadium: Madejski Stadium; Attendance: 15,421; Referee: Keith Hill

13 December 2014 21	Birmingham City	6–1	Reading	Birmingham
15:00 GMT (UTC)	Caddis 4'; Gray 11', 24', 45+1'; Shinnie 46'; Cotterill 60'	BBC; Reading F.C.	Hector (yellow card) 18'; Murray 19'; Gunter (yellow card) 58'	Stadium: St Andrew's; Attendance: 15,240; Referee: Nigel Miller

20 December 2014 22	Reading	0–1	Watford	Reading
15:00 GMT (UTC)	Williams (yellow card) 72'; Murray (yellow card) 90+2'	BBC; Reading F.C.	Abdi (yellow card) 29' (goal) 70'; Angella (yellow card) 38' (yellow-red card) 45+1'	Stadium: Madejski Stadium; Attendance: 18,522; Referee: Gavin Ward

26 December 2014 23	Brighton & Hove Albion	2–2	Reading	Falmer
15:00 GMT (UTC)	Forster-Caskey 40'; Bennett (yellow card) 58'; Calderón 90'	BBC; Reading F.C.	Murray 1', 26' (yellow card) 44'; Cox (yellow card) 38'; Cummings (yellow card) 61'; Norwood (yellow card) 90+2'	Stadium: Falmer Stadium; Attendance: 26,173; Referee: Graham Salisbury

28 December 2014 24	Reading	2–1	Norwich City	Reading
15:00 GMT (UTC)	Robson-Kanu 25' (pen.); Cox 34'	BBC; Reading F.C.	Johnson (yellow card) 24' (goal) 71'; Martin (yellow card) 63'; Whittaker (yellow card) 90+2'	Stadium: Madejski Stadium; Attendance: 19,430; Referee: James Linington

10 January 2015 25	Reading	0–0	Middlesbrough	Reading
15:00 GMT (UTC)	Norwood (yellow card) 42'; Obita (yellow card) 54'	BBC; Reading F.C.	Tomlin (yellow card) 68'	Stadium: Madejski Stadium; Attendance: 17,131; Referee: Charles Breakspear

17 January 2015 26	Fulham	2–1	Reading	Fulham
15:00 GMT (UTC)	Bodurov (yellow card) 33'; Kačaniklić (yellow card) 52' (goal) 55'; Tunnicliffe (yellow card) 74'; Ruiz 90+3'	BBC [ Reading F.C.]	Pogrebnyak 63' (yellow card) 67'; McCleary (yellow card) 77'; Cox (yellow card) 84'; Gunter (yellow card) 90+1'	Stadium: Craven Cottage; Attendance: 17,831; Referee: Mark Brown

27 January 2015 27	Millwall	0–0	Reading	Bermondsey
19:45 GMT (UTC)	Nelson (red card) 45'	BBC; Reading F.C.	Mackie (yellow card) 85'	Stadium: The Den; Attendance: Andy Madley; Referee: 8,317

31 January 2015 28	Reading	2–0	Sheffield Wednesday	Reading
15:00 GMT (UTC)	Pogrebnyak 29'; Chalobah 40'; Hector (yellow card) 67'	BBC; Reading F.C.	Loovens (yellow card) 34'	Stadium: Madejski Stadium; Attendance: 17,755; Referee: Brendan Malone

7 February 2015 29	Wolverhampton Wanderers	1–2	Reading	Wolverhampton
15:00 GMT (UTC)	Stearman (yellow card) 18'; Afobe 26'	BBC; Reading F.C.	Pogrebnyak 1' (yellow card) 90+1'; Williams (yellow card) 33' (goal) 70'; S.Kelly (yellow card) 43'; Robson-Kanu (yellow card) 51'	Stadium: Molineux; Attendance: 20,274; Referee: Keith Hill

10 February 2015 30	Reading	0–2	Leeds United	Reading
20:00 GMT (UTC)		BBC; Reading F.C.	Wootton (yellow card) 59'; Murphy 63'; Byram 90' (yellow card) 90+1'	Stadium: Madejski Stadium; Attendance: 18,124; Referee: Graham Scott

17 February 2015 31	Reading	0–1	Wigan Athletic	Reading
20:00 GMT (UTC)	A.Pearce (yellow card) 90+2'	BBC; Reading F.C.	J.Pearce 17' (yellow card) 61'; Herd (yellow card) 48'; Clarke (yellow card) 62'; Ojo (yellow card) 70'; Taylor (yellow card) 85'; Kim Bo-kyung (yellow card) 90+1'	Stadium: Madejski Stadium; Attendance: 14,601; Referee: Simon Hooper

21 February 2015 32	Ipswich Town	0–1	Reading	Ipswich
15:00 GMT (UTC)	Bru (yellow card) 67'	BBC; Reading F.C.	Mackie 14'; Obita (yellow card) 75'	Stadium: Portman Road; Attendance: 21,298; Referee: Eddie Ilderton

24 February 2015 33	Huddersfield Town	3–0	Reading	Huddersfield
19:45 GMT (UTC)	Bunn 10'; Wells 55'; Miller 74'	BBC; Reading F.C.	Kelly (yellow card) 12'; Obita (yellow card) 89'	Stadium: John Smith's Stadium; Attendance: 10,282; Referee: James Adcock

28 February 2015 34	Reading	0–3	Nottingham Forest	Reading
15:00 GMT (UTC)	McCleary (yellow card) 60'	BBC; Reading F.C.	Osborn 56'; Fryatt 70'; Gary Gardner 80'	Stadium: Madejski Stadium; Attendance: 18,586; Referee: Mick Russell

3 March 2015 35	Bolton Wanderers	1–1	Reading	Bolton
20:00 GMT (UTC)	Guðjohnsen 60'; Dervite (yellow card) 88'	BBC; Reading F.C.	Norwood (yellow card) 64'; Pogrebnyak (yellow card) 79'; Mackie 90+3'	Stadium: Macron Stadium; Attendance: 12,795; Referee: Mark Haywood

10 March 2015 36	Reading	2–1	Brighton & Hove Albion	Reading
20:00 GMT (UTC)	Mackie 24', 56'; McCleary (yellow card) 88'; Pogrebnyak (yellow card) 90'	BBC; Reading F.C.	O'Grady 53' (pen.); Ince (yellow card) 61'; Dunk (yellow card) 87'; Bennett (yellow card) 88'; Greer (yellow card) 90'	Stadium: Madejski Stadium; Attendance: 14,748; Referee: Andy Haines

14 March 2015 37	Watford	4–1	Reading	Watford
15:00 GMT (UTC)	Abdi 1'; Vydra 39'; Deeney 48'; Forestieri 85'	BBC; Reading F.C.	Karacan 70'	Stadium: Vicarage Road; Attendance: 16,660; Referee: Darren Bond

17 March 2015 38	Reading	Postponed	Birmingham City	Reading
20:00 GMT (UTC)		[ BBC] Reading F.C.		Stadium: Madejski Stadium

21 March 2015 39	Charlton Athletic	3–2	Reading	Charlton
15:00 GMT (UTC)	Johnson (yellow card) 29'; Buyens 58' (pen.), 70' (yellow card) 88'; Church 80'; Watt (yellow card) 85'	BBC; Reading F.C.	Pogrebnyak 40', 90+4'; Norwood (yellow card) 56'; Hector (yellow card) 57'; Williams (yellow card) 69' (yellow-red card) 85'	Stadium: The Valley; Attendance: 15,007; Referee: Darren Deadman

4 April 2015 40	Reading	1–1	Cardiff City	Reading
15:00 BST (UTC+1)	Pogrebnyak 4'	BBC; Reading F.C.	McAleny 90'	Stadium: Madejski Stadium; Attendance: 17,953; Referee: Scott Duncan

7 April 2015 41	Blackpool	1–1	Reading	Blackpool
19:45 BST (UTC+1)	O'Hara 6' (pen.), (yellow card) 90+4'	BBC; Reading F.C.	McCleary (yellow card) 39'; Hall 46' (o.g.); Gunter (yellow card) 57'	Stadium: Bloomfield Road; Attendance: 9,614; Referee: Geoff Eltringham

11 April 2015 42	Reading	0–0	Blackburn Rovers	Reading
15:00 BST (UTC+1)	Robson-Kanu (yellow card) 90'	BBC; Reading F.C.	Williamson (yellow card) 81'	Stadium: Madejski Stadium; Attendance: 17,564; Referee: Michael Bull

14 April 2015 43	Reading	0–1	Bournemouth	Reading
20:00 BST (UTC+1)	Hector (yellow card) 55'; Pearce (yellow card) 78'	BBC; Reading F.C.	Wilson 4' (yellow card) 55'; Francis (yellow card) 72'; Boruc (yellow card) 90+2'; Smith (yellow card) 90+3'	Stadium: Madejski Stadium; Attendance: 18,917; Referee: Keith Stroud

18 April 2015 44	Rotherham United	Postponed	Reading	Rotherham
15:00 BST (UTC+1)		[ BBC] [ Reading F.C.]		Stadium: New York Stadium

22 April 2015 38	Reading	0–1	Birmingham City	Reading
20:00 BST (UTC+1)	Obita (yellow card) 69'	BBC; Reading F.C.	Donaldson 83'	Stadium: Madejski Stadium; Attendance: 14,604; Referee: Lee Mason

25 April 2015 45	Reading	0–2	Brentford	Reading
15:00 BST (UTC+1)	Norwood (yellow card) 35'; McCleary (yellow card) 64'; Obita (yellow card) 86'	BBC; Reading F.C.	Judge 7'; Button (yellow card) 31'; Tarkowski 65'	Stadium: Madejski Stadium; Attendance: 20,048; Referee: Andy Madley

28 April 2015 44	Rotherham United	2–1	Reading	Rotherham
19:45 BST (UTC+1)	Derbyshire 52' (yellow card) 81'; Frecklington 58'	BBC; Reading F.C.	Norwood 87'	Stadium: New York Stadium; Attendance: 11,123; Referee: Graham Salisbury

2 May 2015 46	Derby County	0–3	Reading	Derby
12:15 BST (UTC+1)	Lingard (yellow card) 58'; Shotton (yellow card) 66'; Grant (yellow card) 85'	BBC; Reading F.C.	Appiah 2'; Norwood (yellow card) 27'; Hector 72'; McCleary 85' (pen.); Williams (yellow card) 90+3'	Stadium: iPro Stadium; Attendance: 30,806; Referee: James Linington

=== League Cup ===
12 August 2014 First round	Reading	3–1	Newport County	Reading
20:00 BST (UTC+1)	Pogrebnyak 20'; Cox (yellow card) 53'; Hector (yellow card) 78'; Blackman 87'; Tanner 90+4'	BBC; Reading F.C.	Feely (yellow card) 44'; Jackson (yellow card) 64'; Jeffers 90+3'	Stadium: Madejski Stadium; Attendance: 6,459; Referee: James Linington

26 August 2014 Second round	Scunthorpe United	0–1	Reading	Scunthorpe
19:45 BST (UTC+1)	McSheffrey (yellow card) 1'	BBC; Reading F.C.	Taylor 85' (yellow card) 90+2'	Stadium: Glanford Park; Attendance: 2,657; Referee: Kevin Wright

23 September 2014 Third round	Derby County	2–0	Reading	Derby
19:45 BST (UTC+1)	Russell 67'; Pearce 82' (o.g.)	BBC; Reading F.C.	Robson-Kanu (yellow card) 44'	Stadium: Pride Park Stadium; Attendance: 18,409; Referee: Simon Hooper

=== FA Cup ===
3 January 2015 Third round	Huddersfield Town	0–1	Reading	Huddersfield
15:00 GMT (UTC)	Smith (yellow card) 29'; Hudson (yellow card) 45+2'; Hogg (yellow card) 56' (yellow-red card) 90'	BBC; Reading F.C.	Mackie (yellow card) 17'; Blackman 69'; Robson-Kanu (yellow card) 88'; Williams (yellow card) 90'	Stadium: John Smith's Stadium; Attendance: 7,980; Referee: Paul Gibbs

24 January 2015 Fourth round	Cardiff City	1–2	Reading	Cardiff
15:00 GMT (UTC)	Turner (yellow card) 25'; Jones 25'; Whittingham (yellow card) 32'; Noone (yellow card) 67'	BBC; Reading F.C.	Norwood 64'; Pogrebnyak (yellow card) 66'; Robson-Kanu 88'	Stadium: Cardiff City Stadium; Attendance: 11,750; Referee: Lee Probert

14 February 2015 Fifth round	Derby County	1–2	Reading	Derby
15:00 GMT (UTC)	Mascarell (yellow card) 8'; Warnock (yellow card) 16' (yellow-red card) 39'; Bent 61'; Bryson (yellow card) 81'	BBC; Reading F.C.	Williams (yellow card) 28'; Obita (yellow card) 41'; Robson-Kanu 53'; Kelly (yellow card) 77'; Yakubu 82'	Stadium: iPro Stadium; Attendance: 21,337; Referee: Craig Pawson

7 March 2015 Quarter Final	Bradford City	0–0	Reading	Bradford
12:45 GMT (UTC)	McArdle (yellow card) 37'	BBC; Reading F.C.		Stadium: Coral Windows Stadium; Attendance: 24,321; Referee: Neil Swarbrick

16 March 2015 Quarter Final Replay	Reading	3–0	Bradford City	Reading
19:45 GMT (UTC)	Robson-Kanu 6'; McCleary 9'; Williams (yellow card) 30'; Mackie 68'	BBC; Reading F.C.	Knott (yellow card) 28'; Sheehan (yellow card) 32'; Meredith (yellow card) 53'; Morais (red card) 62'	Stadium: Madejski Stadium; Attendance: 22,908; Referee: Mike Jones

18 April 2015 Semi Final	Reading	1–2 (a.e.t.)	Arsenal	London
17:20 BST (UTC+1)	Chalobah (yellow card) 45+2'; McCleary 54'	BBC; Reading F.C.	Sánchez 39', 105+1'; Gabriel (yellow card) 108'	Stadium: Wembley Stadium; Attendance: 84,081; Referee: Martin Atkinson

== Squad statistics ==
As of match played 2 May 2015

=== Appearances and goals ===
No.	Pos	Nat	Player	Total		Championship		FA Cup		League Cup	
No.	Pos	Nat	Player	Apps	Goals	Apps	Goals	Apps	Goals	Apps	Goals
1	GK	(Australia) AUS	Adam Federici	49	0	43	0	5	0	1	0
2	DF	(Wales) WAL	Chris Gunter	45	0	38	0	4	0	3	0
3	DF	(Republic of Ireland) IRL	Stephen Kelly	18	0	14+1	0	2+1	0	0	0
4	DF	(England) ENG	Anton Ferdinand	2	0	1+1	0	0	0	0	0
5	DF	(Republic of Ireland) IRL	Alex Pearce	49	0	39+1	0	6	0	3	0
6	MF	(Northern Ireland) NIR	Oliver Norwood	42	2	32+6	1	3+1	1	0	0
7	FW	(Russia) RUS	Pavel Pogrebnyak	34	8	18+9	7	5	0	2	1
9	MF	(Wales) WAL	Hal Robson-Kanu	36	4	26+3	1	5+1	3	1	0
10	FW	(Republic of Ireland) IRL	Simon Cox	43	8	28+9	8	2+1	0	2+1	0
11	MF	(England) ENG	Jordan Obita	51	0	43	0	6	0	2	0
12	MF	(Jamaica) JAM	Garath McCleary	30	3	22+4	1	3+1	2	0	0
14	MF	(England) ENG	Nathaniel Chalobah	20	1	15	1	5	0	0	0
15	DF	(England) ENG	Michael Hector	49	3	40+1	3	6	0	2	0
16	MF	(Nigeria) NGR	Hope Akpan	24	0	14+6	0	0+2	0	1+1	0
17	MF	(Australia) AUS	Ryan Edwards	10	0	4+3	0	0	0	1+2	0
19	FW	(Scotland) SCO	Jamie Mackie	38	6	18+14	5	4	1	2	0
20	FW	(Nigeria) NGR	Yakubu	11	1	3+4	0	0+4	1	0	0
21	MF	(Turkey) TUR	Jem Karacan	9	1	5+3	1	0+1	0	0	0
22	FW	(England) ENG	Nick Blackman	43	5	16+21	3	1+3	1	2	1
23	MF	(United States) USA	Danny Williams	31	1	21+4	1	6	0	0	0
24	DF	(England) ENG	Zat Knight	2	0	2	0	0	0	0	0
26	DF	(Republic of Ireland) IRL	Pierce Sweeney	0	0	0	0	0	0	0	0
28	MF	(England) ENG	Aaron Kuhl	8	0	3+3	0	0	0	2	0
29	DF	(Slovenia) SLO	Jure Travner	1	0	1	0	0	0	0	0
31	GK	(Denmark) DEN	Mikkel Andersen	5	0	3	0	1	0	1	0
32	DF	(Republic of Ireland) IRL	Sean Long	1	0	0	0	0	0	0+1	0
33	DF	(Republic of Ireland) IRL	Shane Griffin	0	0	0	0	0	0	0	0
34	DF	(England) ENG	Niall Keown	2	0	1+1	0	0	0	0	0
35	DF	(England) ENG	Jake Cooper	19	2	9+6	2	0+2	0	1+1	0
36	FW	(United States) USA	Andrija Novakovich	2	0	0+2	0	0	0	0	0
37	MF	(England) ENG	Jack Stacey	6	0	2+4	0	0	0	0	0
38	MF	(Republic of Ireland) IRL	Liam Kelly	0	0	0	0	0	0	0	0
39	MF	(England) ENG	Tarique Fosu	1	0	0+1	0	0	0	0	0
44	FW	(Ghana) GHA	Kwesi Appiah	6	1	2+4	1	0	0	0	0
—	DF	(England) ENG	Nana Owusu	0	0	0	0	0	0	0	0
—	MF	(Republic of Ireland) IRL	Conor Shaughnessy	0	0	0	0	0	0	0	0
Players away from the club on loan:
8	MF	(England) ENG	Danny Guthrie	11	0	2+7	0	1	0	1	0
18	MF	(England) ENG	Aaron Tshibola	1	0	0+1	0	0	0	0	0
25	MF	(Wales) WAL	Jake Taylor	25	3	14+8	2	0	0	1+2	1
27	FW	(England) ENG	Craig Tanner	5	1	0+3	0	0	0	1+1	1
30	FW	(England) ENG	Dominic Samuel	1	0	0	0	0+1	0	0	0
40	GK	(England) ENG	Stuart Moore	0	0	0	0	0	0	0	0
41	GK	(England) ENG	Daniel Lincoln	0	0	0	0	0	0	0	0
42	GK	(Scotland) SCO	Jonathan Henly	0	0	0	0	0	0	0	0
	DF	(England) ENG	Robert Dickie	0	0	0	0	0	0	0	0
—	DF	(Scotland) SCO	Dominic Hyam	0	0	0	0	0	0	0	0
—	DF	(Scotland) SCO	George McLennan	0	0	0	0	0	0	0	0
Players who appeared for Reading but left during the season:
6	DF	(England) ENG	Sean Morrison	2	1	1	1	0	0	1	0
20	GK	(England) ENG	Alex McCarthy	1	0	0	0	0	0	1	0
20	FW	(England) ENG	Glenn Murray	18	8	18	8	0	0	0	0
24	DF	(Jamaica) JAM	Shaun Cummings	7	1	4+1	1	0	0	2	0
43	DF	(Netherlands) NED	Nathan Aké	5	0	5	0	0	0	0	0
—	MF	(Netherlands) NED	Royston Drenthe	0	0	0	0	0	0	0	0

=== Goal scorers ===
As of match played 2 May 2014

Place	Position	Nation	Number	Name	Championship	FA Cup	League Cup	Total
1	FW	(England)	20	Glenn Murray	8	0	0	8
1	FW	(Republic of Ireland)	10	Simon Cox	8	0	0	8
1	FW	(Russia)	7	Pavel Pogrebnyak	7	0	1	8
4	FW	(Scotland)	19	Jamie Mackie	5	1	0	6
4	FW	(England)	22	Nick Blackman	3	1	1	5
6	MF	(Wales)	9	Hal Robson-Kanu	1	3	0	4
7	DF	(England)	15	Michael Hector	3	0	0	3
7	MF	(Wales)	25	Jake Taylor	2	0	1	3
7	MF	(Jamaica)	12	Garath McCleary	1	2	0	3
10	DF	(England)	35	Jake Cooper	2	0	0	2
10	MF	(Northern Ireland)	6	Oliver Norwood	1	1	0	2
12	DF	(Jamaica)	24	Shaun Cummings	1	0	0	1
12	DF	(England)	6	Sean Morrison	1	0	0	1
12	MF	(England)	14	Nathaniel Chalobah	1	0	0	1
12	MF	(United States)	23	Danny Williams	1	0	0	1
12	MF	(Turkey)	21	Jem Karacan	1	0	0	1
12	FW	(Ghana)	44	Kwesi Appiah	1	0	0	1
12				Own goal	1	0	0	1
12	FW	(Nigeria)	20	Yakubu	0	1	0	1
12	FW	(England)	27	Craig Tanner	0	0	1	1
Total					48	9	4	61

=== Clean sheets ===
Place	Position	Nation	Number	Name	Championship	FA Cup	League Cup	Total
1	GK	(Australia)	1	Adam Federici	12	2	1	15
2	GK	(Denmark)	31	Mikkel Andersen	0	1	0	1
TOTALS					12	3	1	16

=== Disciplinary record ===
As of match played 2 May 2015

Position	Nation	Number	Name	Championship		FA Cup		League Cup		Total	
Position	Nation	Number	Name	Yellow card	Red card	Yellow card	Red card	Yellow card	Red card	Yellow card	Red card
1	(Australia)	GK	Adam Federici	1	0	0	0	0	0	1	0
2	(Wales)	DF	Chris Gunter	4	0	0	0	0	0	4	0
3	(Republic of Ireland)	DF	Stephen Kelly	2	0	1	0	0	0	3	0
5	(Republic of Ireland)	DF	Alex Pearce	4	1	0	0	0	0	4	1
6	(Northern Ireland)	MF	Oliver Norwood	8	0	0	0	0	0	8	0
7	(Russia)	FW	Pavel Pogrebnyak	5	0	1	0	0	0	6	0
8	(England)	MF	Danny Guthrie	1	0	0	0	0	0	1	0
9	(Wales)	MF	Hal Robson-Kanu	2	0	1	0	1	0	4	0
10	(Republic of Ireland)	FW	Simon Cox	5	0	0	0	1	0	6	0
11	(England)	MF	Jordan Obita	10	0	1	0	0	0	11	0
12	(Jamaica)	MF	Garath McCleary	5	0	0	0	0	0	5	0
14	(England)	MF	Nathaniel Chalobah	0	0	1	0	0	0	1	0
15	(England)	DF	Michael Hector	8	0	0	0	1	0	9	0
16	(Nigeria)	MF	Hope Akpan	4	0	0	0	1	0	5	0
19	(Scotland)	FW	Jamie Mackie	2	0	1	0	0	0	3	0
20	(England)	FW	Glenn Murray	4	0	0	0	0	0	4	0
22	(England)	FW	Nick Blackman	4	0	0	0	0	0	4	0
23	(United States)	MF	Danny Williams	6	1	3	0	0	0	9	1
24	(Jamaica)	DF	Shaun Cummings	2	0	0	0	0	0	2	0
25	(Wales)	MF	Jake Taylor	2	0	0	0	1	0	3	0
28	(England)	MF	Aaron Kuhl	1	0	0	0	0	0	1	0
35	(England)	DF	Jake Cooper	2	0	0	0	0	0	2	0
Total				80	2	9	0	4	0	93	2

== Awards ==
=== Player of the Year ===
	Nationality	Award
Won	(Australia)	Adam Federici
Nominated	(Scotland)	Jamie Mackie
Nominated	(England)	Michael Hector
