= Zingarevich =

Zingarevich (Russian: Зингаревич) is a Russian surname. Notable people with the surname include:

- Anton Zingarevich (born 1982), Russian businessman
- Mikhail Zingarevich (born 1959), Russian businessman
