= Poul Mathiasen =

Danish footballer

Personal information
- Date of birth: 17 October 1947 (age 79)
- Position: Left-back

Senior career*
| Years | Team | Apps | (Gls) |
| 1965–1980 | Fremad Amager | | |

International career
| 1975 | Denmark | 1 | (0) |
- * Club domestic league appearances and goals

Poul Mathiasen (born 17 October 1947) is a Danish former footballer who played as a left-back for Fremad Amager. He made one appearance for the Denmark national team in 1975.
