= Mikhail Zingarevich =

Mikhail G. Zingarevich
- Михаи́л Геннадьевич Зингаревич
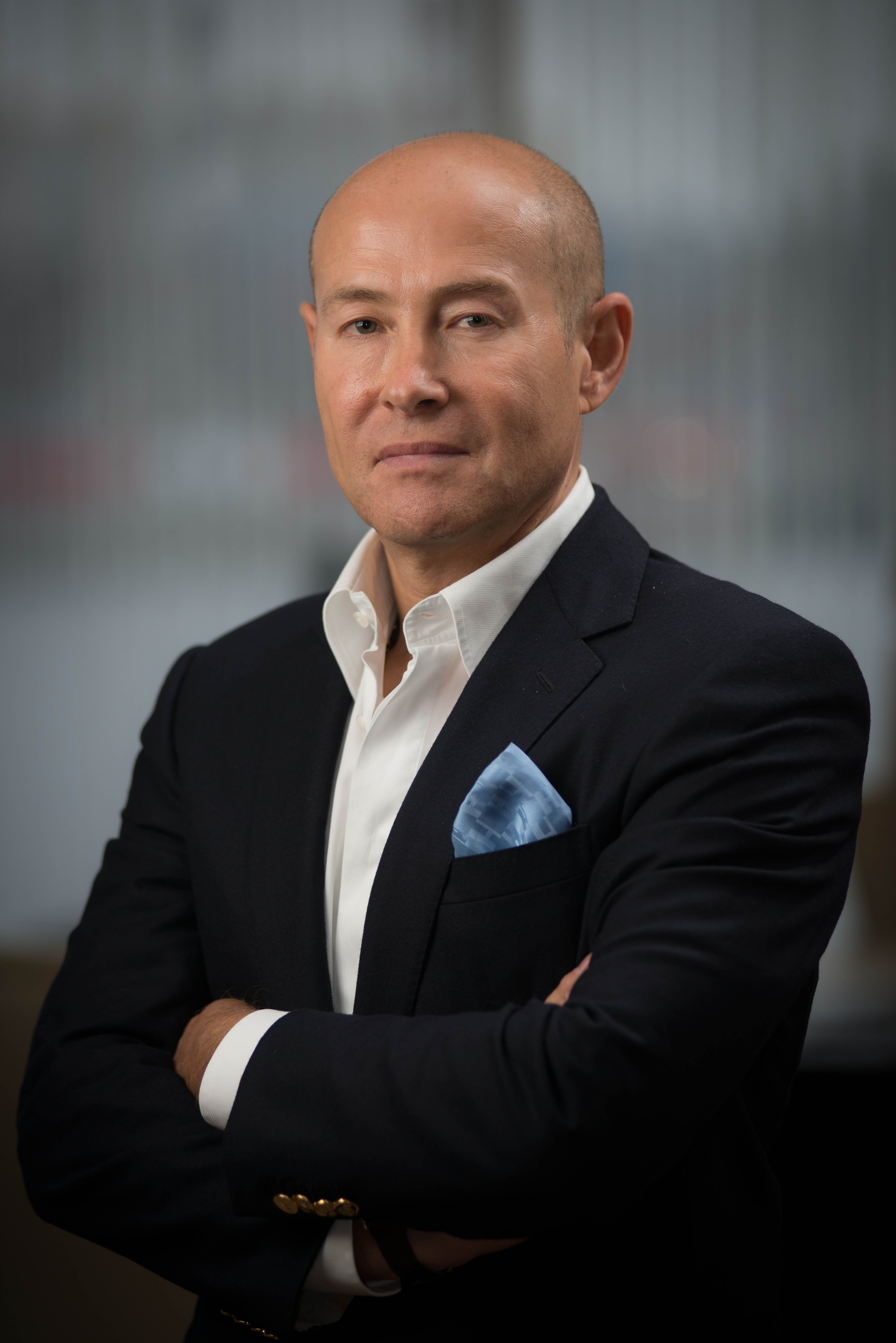
- Mikhail G. Zingarevich
- Born: 8 July 1959 (age 67); Sebezh, Pskov region, USSR
- Citizenship: Israel
- Education: Leningrad Technological Institute for the Pulp and Paper Industry
- Occupations: International business executive; philanthropist; engineer
- Years active: 1981–present
- Organization: Ilim Group
- Known for: Co-founding Ilim Group

Mikhail Gennadyevich Zingarevich (Russian: Михаил Геннадьевич Зингаревич; born July 8, 1959) is an entrepreneur, philanthropist, and invested in the forest industry, gold mining, and high-tech projects. He is an honorary professor at the Highest School of Technology and Energy at the Saint Petersburg State University for Technology and Design.

== Biography ==
Mikhail Zingarevich was born in Sebezh, Pskov region, and grew up in the town of Segezha, Karelia, where his parents, both teachers, moved for work. His father, Gennady Zakharyevich, headed the mathematics department at Segezha's School No. 1. Mikhail has a twin brother, Boris.

During their childhood, Mikhail and Boris were passionate about ice hockey. They participated in the national "Golden Puck" tournament and were recognized as the best forwards in Karelia. Although they had promising sports careers, they chose to focus on education.

In 1981, Mikhail graduated from the Leningrad Technological Institute for the Pulp and Paper Industry with a degree in "Machinery and equipment for the pulp and paper industry." In 2007, he was awarded the title of honorary professor at his alma mater, which was later renamed the Saint Petersburg State University for Technology and Design.

From 1981 to 1991, Mikhail held various engineering positions at several pulp and paper enterprises, including the Segezha pulp-and-paper plant and the Izmail pulp-and-cardboard plant.

In 1991, he became the Chief Sales Manager of Technoferm, establishing export sales processes for cellulose and paper products.

In 1992, together with partners, Mikhail co-founded Ilim Pulp Enterprise, which was reorganized into Ilim Group in 1996. He managed logistics and sales in Eastern and Western Europe as well as China. In 1996, he opened the company's representative office in Beijing, China, to focus on expanding pulp exports to China.

Since 2001, he was a member of the Ilim Pulp Enterprise board of directors, responsible for sales, marketing, and new business development.

Since 2006, he has been a board member of Ilim Group, where he chaired the Compensation and Nominations Committee.

In 2006, 50% of Ilim Pulp was sold to International Paper. In 2023, International Paper sold its 50% stake in the Swiss holding company Ilim SA, which owns the largest pulp-and-paper producer in Russia, the Ilim Group, to its Russian partner in the joint venture, LLC "Ilim Global Timber Rus," owned by Zakhar Smushkin and Boris Zingarevich.

In 2009, Mikhail became a co-investor in the real estate development company "Plaza Lotus Group". The company's first project, the SINOP business center, was completed and sold in 2014 for approximately 2 billion rubles.

== Ice hockey ==
In 2011, Mikhail Zingarevich, together with his brother Boris, founded the "Nevsky Legion" ice hockey team. Mikhail Gennadyevich served as the captain of the team, which became the champion of the IV All-Russian Amateur Hockey Festival held in Sochi in 2015. The team also won a federal grant for the construction of a stadium in Saint Petersburg. Those that exist are overloaded: all ice time is booked months in advance. A new facility could provide a further boost to the development of amateur hockey in the city and sports in general," said Mikhail.

== See also ==
- Forestry in Russia
