= Niels Peder Hansen =

Danish footballer (1901-1987)

Personal information
- Date of birth: 11 May 1901
- Place of birth: Tilsted, Denmark
- Date of death: 1 April 1987 (aged 85)
- Position: Goalkeeper

Senior career*
Years	Team	Apps	(Gls)
- BK Frem

International career
1928	Denmark	2	(0)
- * Club domestic league appearances and goals

Niels Peder Hansen (11 May 1901 – 1 April 1987) was a Danish footballer. He played in two matches for the Denmark national football team in 1928. His son, John, was also a footballer who played for BK Frem.
