= Vibrac Corporation =

- Industry: Finance
- Headquarters: Tortola, British Virgin Islands

Vibrac Corporation is a company incorporated in the British Virgin Islands. They have made national newspaper headlines in the United Kingdom for providing multi-million pound financial arrangements with Premier League football clubs, typically providing them with cash advances on guaranteed broadcasting fees. Inasmuchas the company is incorporated in the British Virgin Islands it is impossible to determine who the lender is, even though the loans have been approved by the omnibus Premier League company.

Everton

In August 2011, Vibrac provided Everton F.C. with a loan secured against guaranteed broadcasting fees due in the following two seasons. Everton renewed the arrangement with Vibrac in 2012 and 2013.

Fulham

In April 2013, a facility was provided to Fulham F.C. to enable the club to borrow against future guaranteed income. The facility was settled when Shahid Khan purchased Fulham in August 2013.

Southampton

In April 2012, a debenture facility was provided to Southampton.

West Ham United

In September 2013, a facility was provided to West Ham United.

Reading

Reading secured a £10m loan against the August 2014 parachute payment due after their relegation from the Premier League, this was secured after relegation. Upon receiving the £10m parachute payment Reading will owe Vibrac a remaining £1.5million. With Reading seemingly unable to make the remaining payment Vibrac called in BGT to oversee the sale of the club. Vibrac pushed through the sale of Adam Le Fondre to Cardiff and seemingly made things difficult for the chairman, Sir John Madejski, by changing terms of sale on several occasions. This led to many potential investors disengaging with the club, whilst Vibrac sought to push through sale to the mystery Phoenix consortium, which involves former director, and person responsible for bringing Vibrac into Reading, Chris Samuelson. This called the Football League to look into the inappropriate role that Vibrac have given themselves, of running the club without having undertaken the Fit and Proper Persons Test. Reading were subsequently fined £30,000 by The Football League in March 2015.
