= Anton Zingarevich =

Russian businessman

Anton Zingarevich (Russian: Антон Зингаревич) is a Russian businessman best known for being the former owner of Reading Football Club, who play in EFL League One of the English football league. Zingarevich's bid to take over the club was announced in January 2012, and he formally purchased the club on 29 May 2012. Since then, Zingarevich has had minimum interest in the running of the club, however did make the decision to sack manager Brian McDermott, and the subsequent employment of Nigel Adkins. On 2 June 2014, Reading announced that Anton Zingarevich had left the board of the club.

== Early life and education ==
Zingarevich is the son of Boris Zingarevich, a Russian multi-billionaire. Zingarevich attended Thornlow Senior School in Weymouth, Dorset, from the age of 14. At the age of 16, Zingarevich began education at Bearwood College, near Wokingham, England, studying there for two years. Whilst studying at Bearwood, Zingarevich would watch Reading F.C. play at Elm Park and in his free time he would play Football Manager.

== Football ==
=== Everton ===
In 2004, Zingarevich was linked with a £20m takeover of Everton. A later investigation from Al Jazeera released in 2021 showed that Christopher Samuelson, and English intermediary, was creating a scheme in order to bypass the FA regulations and to hide the identity of the Zingarevich's family in the purchase of Everton. The deal was never finished as someone leaked it to media with Boris Zingarevich issuing a statement saying neither he nor Anton would be purchasing a football club; however, Christopher Samuelson created the same scheme to acquire Reading for the Zingarevich's, this time successfully.

=== Reading ===
In January 2012, it was announced that Sir John Madejski, the chairman of Championship football club Reading F.C., was in talks with Thames Sport Investment, a company founded by Zingarevich, over a takeover of the club. The deal was completed on 29 May 2012. The takeover had a significant effect on the club's fortunes, persuading star player Jimmy Kébé to sign a new contract and Blackburn Rovers forward Jason Roberts to join the club. Reading were promoted as Champions at the end of the season, prompting Zingarevich to promise to expand the Madejski Stadium and invest in the club's academy. Following Reading's promotion, Zingarevich became heavily involved in helping manager Brian McDermott to sign his transfer targets, personally meeting with Pavel Pogrebnyak and Gylfi Sigurðsson in attempts to convince them to sign for Reading. Pogrebnyak, a Russian international, did sign for Reading, and McDermott praised Zingarevich's contribution On 11 March 2013, Zingarevich sacked McDermott with Reading in 19th place. Zingarevich described the sacking as "the hardest decision of my life". Since then Zingarevich only made a few more appearances at the club. On 2 June 2014, Reading announced that Anton Zingarevich had left the board of the club.

=== Botev ===
In 2021, Zingarevich became owner of Bulgarian club Botev Plovdiv. The Russian appointed Azrudin Valentić - coach of the second tier team Fremad Amager, as coach and the Spanish Daniel Cerejido as Executive Director. Daniel Cerejido suddenly left the management after only 10 months in the post for "disagreements with the management and coaching team", leaving the club in 1st position after saving them from the relegation in the season before. After six months with no management the club appointed the Russian German Chistyakov in the position of CEO. Botev Plovdiv finished 3rd that season obtaining a position in the 2022–23 UEFA Europa Conference League, to be lately eliminated by APOEL without scoring, provoking the dismissal of the coach Azrudin Valentic. Only one year after his appointment, with the club fighting not to go in the relegation group, Chistyakov followed the path of Cerejido and resigned from this position for disagreements with the policy implemented by Zingarevich and the board of the club.

On 24 April 2023, for the first time in history, Botev Plovdiv's line-up had no Bulgarian players in its composition.

On 29 April 2023 the renovated Hristo Botev Stadium hosted its first match (against Levski Sofia). The remainder of the 2022–23 league campaign was difficult: the side finished 10th, and media coverage criticised the gap between reported budget level and league position. On 24 April 2023 Botev fielded a starting lineup with no Bulgarian players for the first time in the club’s history. Contemporary reports also noted that the team failed to score in its first league matches at the new stadium at the end of that season.

On 4 May 2023 numerous media articles reported that PFC Botev's budget was the third biggest in the Bulgarian league with the worst correlation in history in terms of budget-qualification, with the team finishing in the 10th position of the EFBET League, creating a lot of criticism about the skills of the management team of PFC Botev and, in particular about Mr. Zingarevich.

On 6 June 2023 Zingarevich's team finished the season without scoring a single goal in the newly opened Hristo Botev stadium and with a remarkable record of 4 defeats and 1 tie.

On October 31, 2023, Botev announced that it would accept Bitcoin (including Lightning Network payments) for retail and in-stadium purchases, with ticket sales planned to follow—an unusual move among European senior clubs.

On 22 December 2023 Russian and Bulgarian media informed that Zingarevich and PFC Botev were subject of an investigation of FIFA's disciplinary committee for the irregular transfer of minors from Africa to Europe using European clubs. According to the media Zingarevich, if found guilty, could be banned from football for a period of 15 years, be forced to pay an economic fine and PFC Botev could suffer from a two to three-period ban of transfers.

On 15 May 2024, Botev won the 2023–24 Bulgarian Cup, defeating league champions Ludogorets Razgrad 3–2 in the final in Sofia—the club’s fourth domestic cup and first since 2017. The victory secured a return to UEFA competitions for 2024–25.

After being banned from entering Bulgaria, Zingarevich, in a desperate attempt to recover some money from the fans of the club and probably leave, put on public sell through the Association of Fans 30% of the shares of the club failing, once again, in his endeavours. During the month of May 2025, the Russian sent a representative to negotiate with the players the condonation of the debt that the club has with them under the threat that, if they are not accepting the terms proposed, he will be bankrupting the club. Among media rumours of Zingarevich emblezzing incoming revenue from transfers but covering the operational costs of the clubs via loans, the threat materialised in the month of June 2025 when he delivered a message to the fans of the club offering them three choices for the future of the club, two of them with Zingarevich exiting the club and the last one, to file for bankruptcy.

The club, represented by Alexey Kirichek, started negotiations with the local olygharc Ilian Filipov for the transfer of the shares and exchanged letters in their respective media with the scope of inform the public. The club, after an own "due diligence" stated that the debt was 5.5 million lv. but refused to sign any document assuming responsibility for the excess of debt declared. Also, it was found out that the loans to finance the club during the last years are owed to third parties and not to Zingarevich himself or any company related with him. After these findings, Ilian Filipov withdrew from the negotiations.

Ilian Filipov returned to the negotiations after the announcement of the club that Zingarevich will either transfer the shares of the club to the Minority Shareholder (Fan´s association) or declare the club in bankruptcy. Filipov assumed the debt of about 3 million euro remitted to him by the former board of the club without an in-depth due diligence and Zingarevich and his band left to their next project, a 50% share in the Armenian club Alashkert, not before trasferring all his shares to the Fan´s association, who appointed a new board.

=== Other clubs ===
In 2018, companies controlled by Zingarevich acquired a controlling share in Danish club Fremad Amager. During the same time period, Zingarevich also purchased Russian club Vista-Gelendzhik, Ghanaian side Cheetah FC and Nigerian side PSports Academy. Following the acquisition of Botev, Zingarevich sold his shares in Fremad to American investors in 2021.

Zingarevich has used Cyprus-registered Lucid Football Holding and Lucid Football Capital, as well as Monaco-domiciled SCP Waterfront to control and finance his various investments in football.

== Personal life ==
=== Marriage and divorce ===
In 2008, Zingarevich met his future wife, a Belarusian Victoria's Secret model called Yekaterina Domankova, commonly called Katsia. The couple divorced in 2014.

=== Prosecution ===
In 2016, a few years later leaving Reading, an international order of detention was issued by the Russian authorities for a case of embezzlement of 30 million pounds, Zingarevich left the United Kingdom and established his residence in the United States, a territory with no extradition treaty with Russia.

=== Sanctions ===
In 2022, Anton Zingarevich and his parents were sanctioned by decree of the President of Ukraine due to "close ties to the Russian Federation regime, which has prepared and is conducting, contrary to the charter documents of the United Nations, an aggressive war against Ukraine, in which crimes against humanity are committed and the genocide of the Ukrainian people is taking place and thus, the subject is responsible for material or financial support for actions that undermine or threaten the territorial integrity, sovereignty and independence of Ukraine."

=== Ban from Bulgaria ===
In November 2024, several media outlets reported that Anton Zingarevich was declared by the Bulgarian Ministry of Defence a danger for the National Security and has been prohibited to enter the country for a period of 10 years.
