= Jacob Gregersen =

Danish footballer (born 1972)

Jacob "Gaxe" Gregersen
Personal information
- Date of birth: 12 October 1972 (age 54)
- Place of birth: Denmark
- Position: Defender

Senior career*
Years	Team	Apps	(Gls)
-1995	Køge Boldklub		
1995-1996	FC Groningen	15	(0)
1996-1997/98	Herfølge Boldklub	18	(0)
- Ølstykke FC
-2003	FC Nordsjælland	31+	(3+)
2003-2004	Odense Boldklub	28	(2)
2004/05-2006	SønderjyskE Fodbold	30+	(1+)
- * Club domestic league appearances and goals

Jacob Gregersen (born 12 October 1972 in Denmark) is a Danish retired footballer.
