= Boris Zingarevich =

Russian businessman

Boris G. Zingarevich
- Борис Геннадьевич Зингаревич
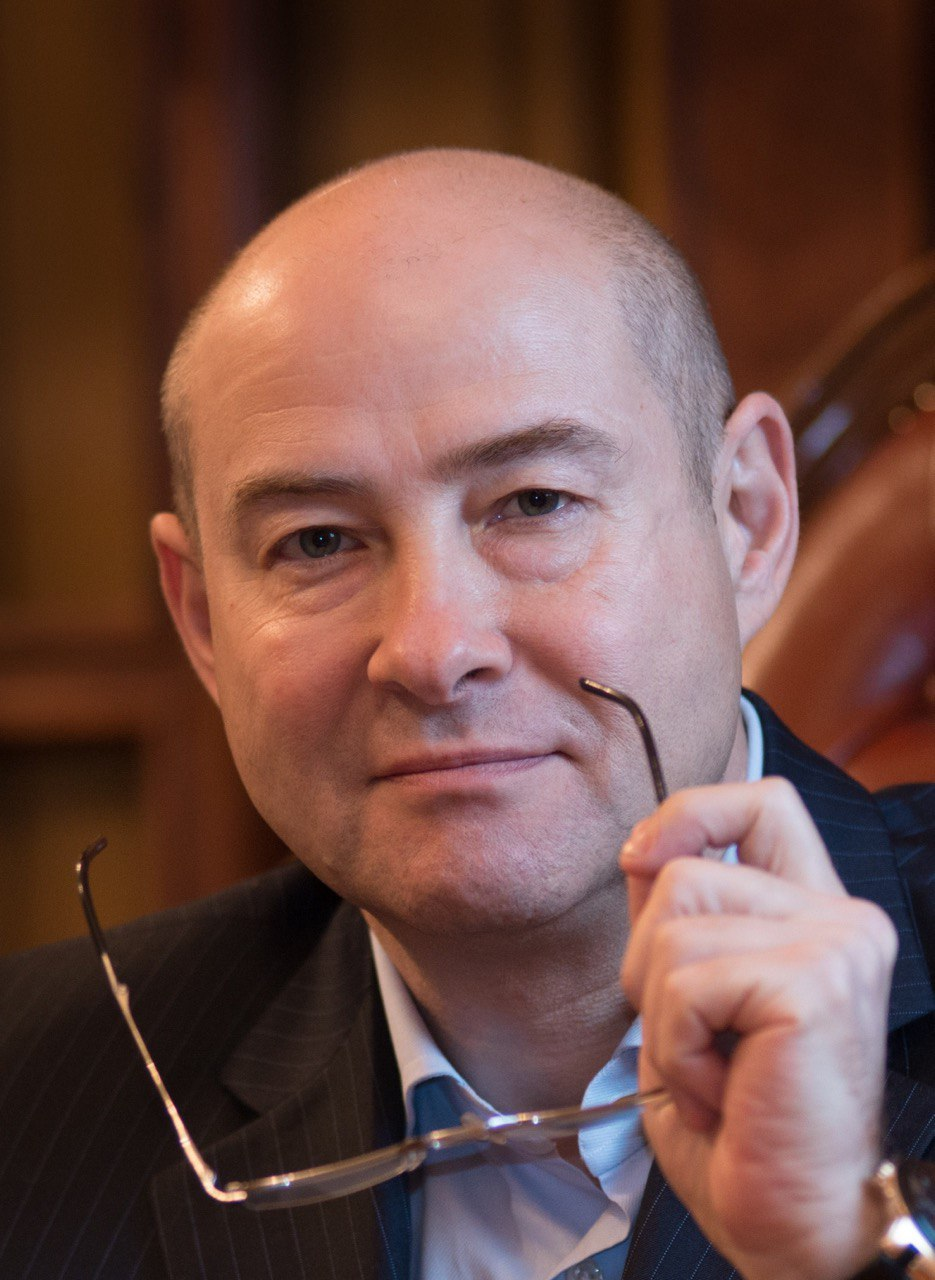
- Boris G. Zingarevich
- Born: 8 July 1959 (age 67); Sebezh, Pskov region, USSR
- Citizenship: Russia
- Education: Leningrad Technological Institute for the Pulp and Paper Industry
- Occupations: International business executive, engineer
- Years active: 1981–present
- Organization(s): Ilim Group, Ilim Timber
- Known for: Co-founding «Ilim Group», «Ilim Timber»

Boris Zingarevich (Russian: Борис Геннадьевич Зингаревич; born July 8, 1959, in the USSR) is a Russian entrepreneur and investor with a focus on projects in the pulp, paper, and timber business as well as on projects in lithium-ion energy-storage solutions for the power-grid and automotive industries.

== Early life ==
Boris Zingarevich was born in the USSR in the town of Sebezh, Pskov region, to a family of teachers. He has a twin brother Mikhail Zingarevich.

He graduated from the Pulp and Paper Technological University (Leningrad) with a diploma in engineering, after which he developed his career in the pulp and paper industry to the position of chief engineer.

== Business career ==
In 1992 Boris Zingarevich founded Ilim Pulp Enterprise together with his brother Mikhail and university schoolmate Zakhar Smushkin. As a member of its board of directors he was in charge of the operational activities and development projects of the company. From there, Ilim Pulp Enterprise became the largest vertically integrated timber company in Russia.

In 2006 Ilim Pulp Enterprise was transformed into OJSC Ilim Group, a joint venture with the International Paper Corporation which held 50% of shares. Boris Zingarevich joined its board of directors.

In 2007, Boris Zingarevich established the company Ilim Timber. It was based on the woodworking assets of Ilim Pulp, which were not included in the joint venture with the International Paper Corporation. Ilim Timber later became a part of the international woodworking holding company.

In the early 2000s, Boris Zingarevich made startup investments in Ener1 - a company which develops energy-storage technologies and manufactures compact lithium-ion-powered batteries for the transportation, utility-grid, and industrial-electronics markets. He also invested in the Think Global electric car production project.
