= 2013–14 Reading F.C. season =

Reading
2013–14 season
- Chairman: Sir John Madejski
- Manager: Nigel Adkins
- Stadium: Madejski Stadium
- Championship: 7th
- FA Cup: Third round (Vs. Brighton & Hove Albion)
- League Cup: Second round (Vs. Peterborough United)
- Top goalscorer: League: Adam Le Fondre (15); All: Adam Le Fondre (15)
- Highest home attendance: 23,335 vs Burnley, Championship, 3 May 2014
- Lowest home attendance: 16,636 vs Blackpool, Championship, 28 January 2014
- Average home league attendance: 19,108
Home colours	Away colours	Third colours

The 2013–14 season was Reading Football Club's first season back in the Championship following the side's relegation from the Premier League at the end of the 2012–13 season. It was also Nigel Adkins' only full season in charge of the club having succeeded Brian McDermott in March 2013.

The campaign began with a home win over Ipswich Town and after ten games the team had lost only once and were in the play-off places. Six defeats in 13 games between October and the new year saw Reading slip to 9th, though their form improved in January with three wins from five, including 7–1 and 5–1 victories over Bolton Wanderers and Blackpool respectively. Despite mixed form from February onwards, Reading remained in contention for the play-offs until the last game of the season. Needing only to equal Brighton & Hove Albion's result to finish in the top six, the team drew at home to already promoted Burnley whilst Brighton scored a last-minute winner at Nottingham Forest. Reading therefore finished seventh and were consigned to the Championship for another season. In the two domestic cup competitions, Reading were knocked out at the stage they entered. They were beaten 6–0 by Peterborough United in the second round of the League Cup, their heaviest defeat since 1999, whilst in the FA Cup third round they lost 1–0 to Brighton.

In his first season as a regular for the senior team Jordan Obita was named as the club's Player of the Season, beating Chris Gunter and Danny Williams into second and third respectively. With 15 goals, Adam Le Fondre was the team's top scorer for the third consecutive season. Somewhat overshadowing the season was the continuing uncertainty over the ownership of the club. The original deadline for the full takeover by Anton Zingarevich passed in September and by February, chairman Sir John Madejski confirmed that Zingarevich was no longer involved and that he was seeking new owners.

== Season review ==
Reading began planning for the 2013–14 Championship season on 28 April 2013, after a 0–0 draw at home to Queens Park Rangers condemned both sides to relegation from the Premier League.

=== Pre-season ===
On 24 May, Reading announced that ten players would be leaving upon the expiry of their contracts. Those departing included Noel Hunt, Nicky Shorey, Ian Harte, Jay Tabb and Simon Church, as well as Joseph Mills, Brett Williams and three youngsters. Nicholas Bignall, who had been out injured since his loan deal with Wycombe Wanderers in 2011, was also released by the club having been named on the Premier League's released player list. Bignall however remained with the club on a non-contract basis whilst recovering from his injury.

Having been unable to agree a new contract over the course of the season, Alex Pearce eventually agreed a new two-year deal in June. Hal Robson-Kanu also agreed a new three-year contract, ending speculation linking him with a move to the Premier League. Goalkeepers Stuart Taylor and Jonathan Henly signed a new one and two-year contracts respectively, while four other out-of-contract players, including Lawson D'Ath also committed their futures to the club. Seven Academy graduates signed professional contracts and were given squad numbers for the first time, including Jake Cooper who was given a three-year deal. They were joined in the senior squad by Craig Tanner and Aaron Tshibola who signed professionally as youngsters in 2011.

In June Reading announced that they had agreed a partnership with Formula One team Marussia. The agreement sees Reading's logo displayed on Marussia's cars, and the Marussia logo on the reverse of Reading's shirts.

==== Transfers ====
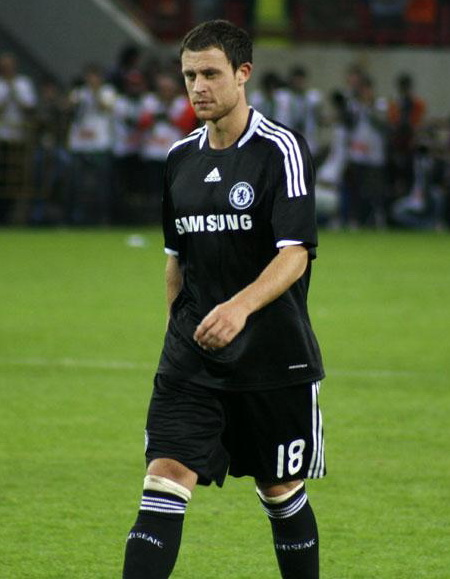
Wayne Bridge was Reading's first signing of the season, joining on a free transfer from Manchester City. Pictured in 2008 playing for Chelsea.

Reading signed three players prior to the start of the season, with all three arriving in July. Wayne Bridge was the first to sign, joining on a one-year deal following the expiry of his contract at Manchester City. Dutch International Royston Drenthe penned a two-year contract, with the option of a third, moving from Russian side Alania Vladikavkaz whilst Danny Williams joined from Hoffenheim for an undisclosed fee on a four-year contract. Former Brighton & Hove Albion manager Dean Wilkins also arrived as first-team coach.

Several players left the club on loan. In June Mikkel Andersen and Nick Arnold joined Danish Superliga side Randers and Wycombe Wanderers respectively on season-long deals. The following month Ryan Edwards moved on a season-long loan to Perth Glory with Daniel Carriço joining Sevilla on a similar deal with a view to a permanent transfer. Aberdeen signed Michael Hector for six months while Karl Sheppard's loan at Shamrock Rovers was extended until the end of the Irish season.

==== Friendlies ====
Reading began pre-season on 13 July with a behind closed doors game against Wycombe Wanderers, winning 3–1. Adam Le Fondre, Pavel Pogrebnyak and Danny Williams, on debut, scored the goals. Two days later a 27-man squad then travelled to Portugal to play two matches. They drew the first, against Belenenses, 1–1 thanks to a late Le Fondre goal and won the second, against Olhanense, 5–1. Upon their return Reading faced Bristol City and suffered their first defeat, losing 1–0 after conceding a late goal. A heavy 3–0 defeat by Swansea City followed, before a 2–1 loss to Bristol Rovers, a long range Garath McCleary strike Reading's only goal.

The under-21 squad, playing as a "Reading XI", started their pre-season on the same day as the senior team and won 1–0 away to Basingstoke Town through a Shepherd Murombedzi goal. Three days later they comfortably beat Dartford 4–0 thanks to goals from Gozie Ugwu, Aaron Tshibola and a double from Craig Tanner. Another goal from Ugwu, one from Tarique Fosu-Henry and an own goal helped the youngsters earn a 3–3 draw against newly promoted League Two side Newport County. They played further games away to Boreham Wood, which they drew 1–1 courtesy of a De'Juane Taylor-Crossdale penalty, and Fulham, which finished 3–3, before a 3–2 win over Bristol City with Jake Taylor among the scorers.

=== August ===
Reading started their season on 3 August at home to Ipswich Town. They went behind when former player Jay Tabb scored in the 16th minute, but equalised shortly before half time through Adam Le Fondre. Danny Guthrie then struck with a 25-yard, deflected shot to secure the victory. A week later the team travelled to Bolton Wanderers and drew 1–1 with Nick Blackman scoring his first goal for the club. The team then returned to the Madejski Stadium for a home game against Watford which Reading lead 2–0 at half time after goals from Le Fondre and Jem Karacan. A second Karacan goal had made it 3–1 before the visitors hit back with a penalty and a 90th-minute equaliser with the game ending 3–3. Goalkeeper Daniel Lincoln moved to Metropolitan Police on a one-month loan midway through the month. Reading confirmed that Werder Bremen striker Joseph Akpala was trialling at the club though ultimately he was not offered a contract. Young Glenavon striker Robbie McDaid also spent a week training with the Academy.

Reading suffered their first defeat of the season away to Blackpool, losing 1–0 after a late Tom Barkhuizen strike. Another away match followed with the side travelling to League One side Peterborough United for the second round of the League Cup. Peterborough took an early lead through Britt Assombalonga and added another two before half time. Three more goals in the second half, including two Lee Tomlin penalties which completed his hat-trick, consigned Reading to a comprehensive 6–0 loss, their heaviest defeat for 14 years. Reading faced Yeovil Town in the last game of the month and won 1–0 in the first ever league meeting between the two sides thanks to a second half Le Fondre penalty. Following the game it was confirmed that Jimmy Kébé had joined Crystal Palace for an undisclosed fee.

=== September ===
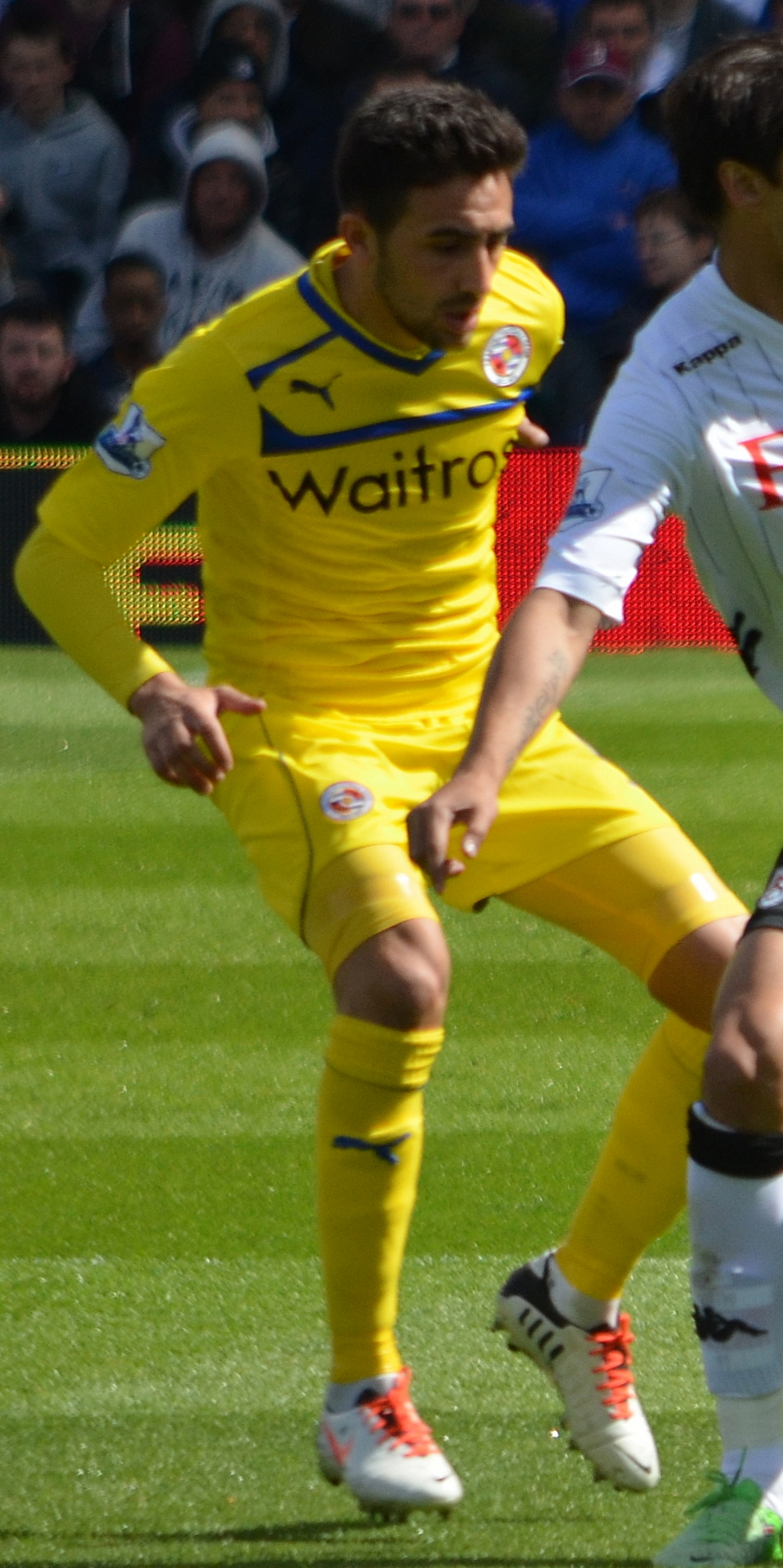
Jem Karacan ruptured his anterior cruciate and medial ligaments against Leeds United and was ruled out for six to nine months.

On transfer deadline day Adrian Mariappa was the only player to leave the club, following Kébé to Crystal Palace. The first game of the month was a friendly against Oman which Reading lost 2–0. They resumed competitive action on 15 September against Brighton & Hove Albion in a televised game that ended 0–0. The first half saw Pavel Pogrebnyak sent off for two bookings while Brighton's Leonardo Ulloa also departed after receiving a straight red card. Reading then faced Leeds United who were under the management of former boss Brian McDermott and, after losing Jem Karacan early on to a serious knee injury, Adam Le Fondre headed home in the 96th minute to steal a 1–0 win.

On 20 September, Reading signed Northern Ireland international defender Chris Baird on a free transfer following his release from Fulham. Matt Partridge joined Basingstoke Town on a one-month loan while Daniel Lincoln was on the move again, joining Harrow Borough on a similar deal. Baird went straight into the team for the game against Derby County at Pride Park which Reading won 3–1. The returning Pavel Pogrebnyak opened the scoring with his first goal for the club since January before doubling their lead with his second of the game. Will Hughes pulled on back for Derby but Nick Blackman's injury time strike secured the win for Reading. Billy Sharp joined on an emergency loan from Southampton late in the month. He was an unused substitute for the game against Birmingham City which Reading won 2–0 through two Danny Guthrie free kicks. Guthrie was later nominated for Championship Player of the Month but lost out to Ipswich Town striker David McGoldrick.

=== October ===
Reading began the month with a trip to Barnsley and drew 1–1 with Hal Robson-Kanu scoring his first goal of the season. Another away trip followed to Burnley where the side lost 2–1, Reading's reply coming from a Jason Shackell own goal. Reading returned from the international break with a home game against Doncaster Rovers which they won 4–1 with goals from Danny Guthrie, Adam Le Fondre, Garath McCleary and Pavel Pogrebnyak. The following week the team faced Millwall at home and took the lead through a Sean Morrison header in the ninth minute. Jimmy Abdou was sent off midway through the second half before Liam Trotter equalised with a 92nd-minute penalty as the game finished 1–1. Prior to the game the club announced that Nick Harvey had joined the club as Head of Sports Science, replacing Karl Halabi. At the end of the month Jonathan Henly moved on loan to Aldershot Town until January.

=== November ===
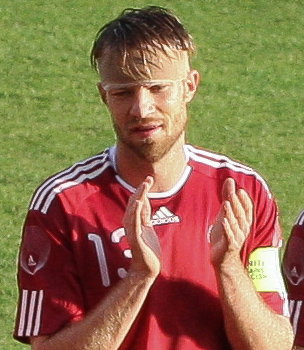
Kaspars Gorkšs' first goal of the season helped Reading clinch their third away win of the season at Nottingham Forest.

The first game in November was an away trip to second from bottom Sheffield Wednesday which ended in a 5–2 defeat. Reading's goals came from Pavel Pogrebnyak and Adam Le Fondre with former player Michail Antonio among the scorers for Wednesday. The team then hosted Queens Park Rangers and took the lead through Garath McCleary though a late Joey Barton free kick leveled the scores as the game finished 1–1. During the international break two players left the club on loan with Gozie Ugwu moving to Shrewsbury Town until early January and Stuart Taylor joining Yeovil Town for a month. Just two days later Taylor's spell was cut short without him having made a competitive appearance due to "personal reasons". Following the international games Reading earned a point away to Blackburn Rovers after a goalless draw. The team then beat Nottingham Forest 3–2 to record their first away win since the victory at Derby in September. Pogrebnyak and Kaspars Gorkšs gave Reading an early 2–0 lead before two ex-Royals, Simon Cox and Darius Henderson drew Forest level. Jordan Obita won the game with his first goal for the club after 74 minutes while Chris Gunter, who was also playing against his former club, was sent off late on for two bookings. Lawson D'Ath joined Dagenham & Redbridge on an emergency loan until the end of December, whilst the local press suggested that Reading had failed in a similar bid for West Bromwich Albion's Graham Dorrans.

=== December ===
Reading started the month with a 1–0 home win over Charlton Athletic with Billy Sharp scoring the only goal of the game, his first for the club. Young winger Shepherd Murombedzi joined Bognor Regis Town on a month's loan, whilst Karl Sheppard made his loan move to Shamrock Rovers permanent. The side then faced Bournemouth at the Madejski Stadium, losing 2–1. Having gone two goals down through Lewis Grabban and Matt Ritchie, a late Adam Le Fondre strike proved no more than a consolation. On 10 December, Sean Morrison and Jordan Obita signed new deals which will keep them with the club until summer 2017. A week later Reading travelled to Huddersfield Town and came away with a 1–0 win courtesy of a first half Billy Sharp header. The team then suffered back-to-back losses, going down 2–1 at home to Wigan Athletic and then 1–0 away to automatic promotion contenders Leicester City; Pavel Pogrebnyak scoring Reading's solitary goal. At the end of the month youngsters Matt Partridge and Daniel Lincoln joined Basingstoke Town and Farnborough respectively, while Lawson D'Ath's stay at Dagenham & Redbridge was extended for a further month. Reading ended the year with a third straight defeat after losing heavily away at Middlesbrough. Two goals from Grant Leadbitter and one from Albert Adomah gave the hosts a 3–0 win with the team's disappointment compounded when Kaspars Gorkšs was sent off for two bookable offences.

=== January ===
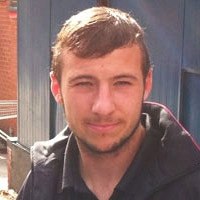
Adam Le Fondre's hat-trick helped Reading to a 7–1 win over Bolton Wanderers, their biggest victory for over 30 years.

The year began with a 1–1 draw against Nottingham Forest at the Madejski Stadium. The visitors took the lead in the first half when former player Greg Halford headed home before Stephen Kelly equalised in the 5th minute of injury time with his first goal for the club. Following the game, Billy Sharp's loan expired and he returned to Southampton. Despite Reading holding further discussions about his future, no move materialised and he eventually joined former club Doncaster Rovers. The club entered the FA Cup at the third round stage and faced Brighton & Hove Albion at Falmer Stadium. An Andrew Crofts goal in the first half enough to give the hosts a 1–0 and send Reading out of the competition at the first hurdle. Several young players moved to and from the club on loan during the month. Michael Hector returned from Aberdeen after a successful six-month spell and was immediately included in the first team squad while Jonathan Henly joined Oxford United for one month. Dominic Samuel also left the club, joining Lawson D'Ath at Dagenham & Redbridge for a month, though his spell there lasted just one game after he suffered a knee injury requiring surgery 40 minutes into his debut.

A first win for nearly a month came away at Watford with Kaspars Gorkšs getting the only goal. The following week Reading recorded their largest win since 29 December 1979, defeating Bolton Wanderers 7–1 with goals from Gorkšs, Pavel Pogrebnyak, Hope Akpan, Nick Blackman and an Adam Le Fondre hat-trick. The goal was Akpan's first for the club while Michael Hector made also his debut as a late substitute. Seven weeks after his last appearance, Chris Baird's contract expired with the club confirming that they would wait until he was fit again before discussing an extension. Despite netting seven times the previous week, Reading were unable to register a goal in their next match as they lost 2–0 away to Ipswich Town with another former player, Stephen Hunt, among the scorers. Back at home for a midweek game against Blackpool, the side returning to scoring form with a second hat-trick in two home games for Le Fondre helping them to a 5–1 victory. Speculation arose that Reading's lack of activity in the transfer window was due to the ongoing discussions over the ownership of the club, with manager Nigel Adkins appearing to confirm the reports. The window closed at the end of the month with no players having arrived, though Director of Football Nick Hammond confirmed that the club had rejected interest in several of their players. Although there were no permanent transfers completed in either direction, Lawson D'Ath's loan at Dagenham & Redbridge was extended until the end of the season.

=== February ===
Reading began the month as they finished the previous, with a comprehensive victory, this time away at Millwall. Goals from Pavel Pogrebnyak, Alex Pearce and Danny Williams secured a 3–0 win. Adam Le Fondre was nominated for January's Championship Player of the Month, and was announced as the winner of the award the following day. The team's next game was a 2–0 defeat at home to Sheffield Wednesday with former Reading loanee Benik Afobe scoring the second for the visitors. The task was made harder when Alex Pearce was sent off after only nine minutes for bringing down Afobe in the penalty area. After the game the club appealed the red card and successfully had it overturned. Reading recovered from the disappointing home defeat to win 3–1 away at promotion rivals Queens Park Rangers. Danny Williams scored his second goal of the month with Alex Pearce and Garath McCleary also on target. Another former player Kevin Doyle, the 2005–06 Reading Player of the Season, had earlier scored the equaliser for QPR. For the second game in a row the team went down to ten men after Kaspars Gorkšs was sent off, though the club were again successful in appealing the decision. Reading's inconsistent form during February continued as they lost their last game of the month 1–0 to Blackburn Rovers. On the loan front, Jonathan Henly's spell at Oxford United was extended for a second month, while fellow goalkeeper Stuart Moore joined Gloucester City until March. After months of speculation and nearly half a year since the full takeover of the club by Anton Zingarevich was due to be completed, Chairman Sir John Madejski confirmed that he was looking for new owners as Zingarevich was no longer involved.

=== March ===
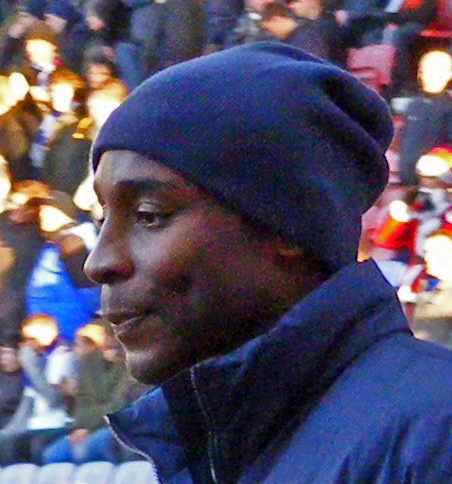
Jason Roberts retired in March after failing to overcome a hip injury he suffered nearly 18 months earlier. Pictured in 2009 whilst at Blackburn Rovers.

The first game of the month was a home tie against Yeovil Town which ended 1–1 despite the visitors being reduced to eight men when Byron Webster, Joe Ralls and Kieffer Moore were all sent off in the second half. Having fallen behind to a Shane Duffy header, Reading missed the chance to equalise when Adam Le Fondre's penalty was saved, though from the resulting corner John Lundstram put the ball into his own net. A week later the team came away with the same result at Brighton & Hove Albion with Royston Drenthe scoring Reading's goal, his first for the club. The team then travelled to Leeds United and secured their first win in four games with a 4–2 victory. Goals from Garath McCleary, Nick Blackman, Hal Robson-Kanu and a second in two games for Drenthe gave the side a 4–0 lead and despite the hosts scoring twice in quick succession, Reading held on for the win. A goalless draw against Derby County followed, before a 2–1 away win at Birmingham City with Jobi McAnuff scoring both goals, his first since 17 March 2012. In between the games Jason Roberts confirmed long suspected rumours that he would retire from football after failing to overcome a hip injury suffered against Southampton in December 2012.

Reading's unbeaten record in March came to an end with a disappointing 3–1 home defeat to relegation threatened Barnsley. Pavel Pogrebnyak scored the team's solitary goal from the penalty spot. A home game against Huddersfield Town concluded a busy month of fixtures with a second penalty in as many games from Pogrebnyak earning the side a 1–1 draw. The result extended Reading's winless run at home win to six games, stretching back to the heavy defeat of Blackpool in January. There was further movement among the club's young goalkeepers during the month as Jonathan Henly and Stuart Moore completed spells at Oxford United and Gloucester City respectively. Both then left the club to join Conference South sides on loan until the end of the season with Henly joining Maidenhead United and Moore, Bath City. Reading also confirmed that they had agreed compensation with Watford for former Academy forward Uche Ikpeazu who left in July 2013 after turning down a professional contract.

=== April ===
The first game of April was an away trip to Charlton Athletic which Reading won 1–0 thanks to a second half Danny Williams goal. Shortly afterwards the club completed their first signing ahead of the new season, bringing in United States under-18 forward Andrija Novakovich as an Academy player. Reading then took on Bournemouth at Dean Court and suffered a convincing 3–1 defeat. With Danny Williams and Danny Guthrie both injured, four wingers lined up in midfield as the team found themselves 3–0 down at half time. Hal Robson-Kanu scored a consolation for Reading in the second half whilst Wayne Bridge and Mikele Leigertwood, who had been out a year, made their return from injury. Returning to the Madejski Stadium the following week, Reading hosted Leicester City in a game that ended in a 1–1 draw. Alex Pearce scored Reading's goal with an early header, whilst in only his second game back, Leigertwood was sent off for two bookable offences in the dying minutes. Another heavy away defeat followed as the team lost 3–0 to fellow promotion contenders Wigan Athletic, with the result seeing Reading drop out of the play-off places for the first time since March. A 2–0 home win over Middlesbrough ensured a swift return to the top six, whilst a 3–1 win at Doncaster Rovers in the following game saw Reading keep their fate in their own hands going into the last day of the season. Having gone 1–0 down, an Adam Le Fondre penalty and late Pavel Pogrebnyak brace secured the victory.

=== May ===
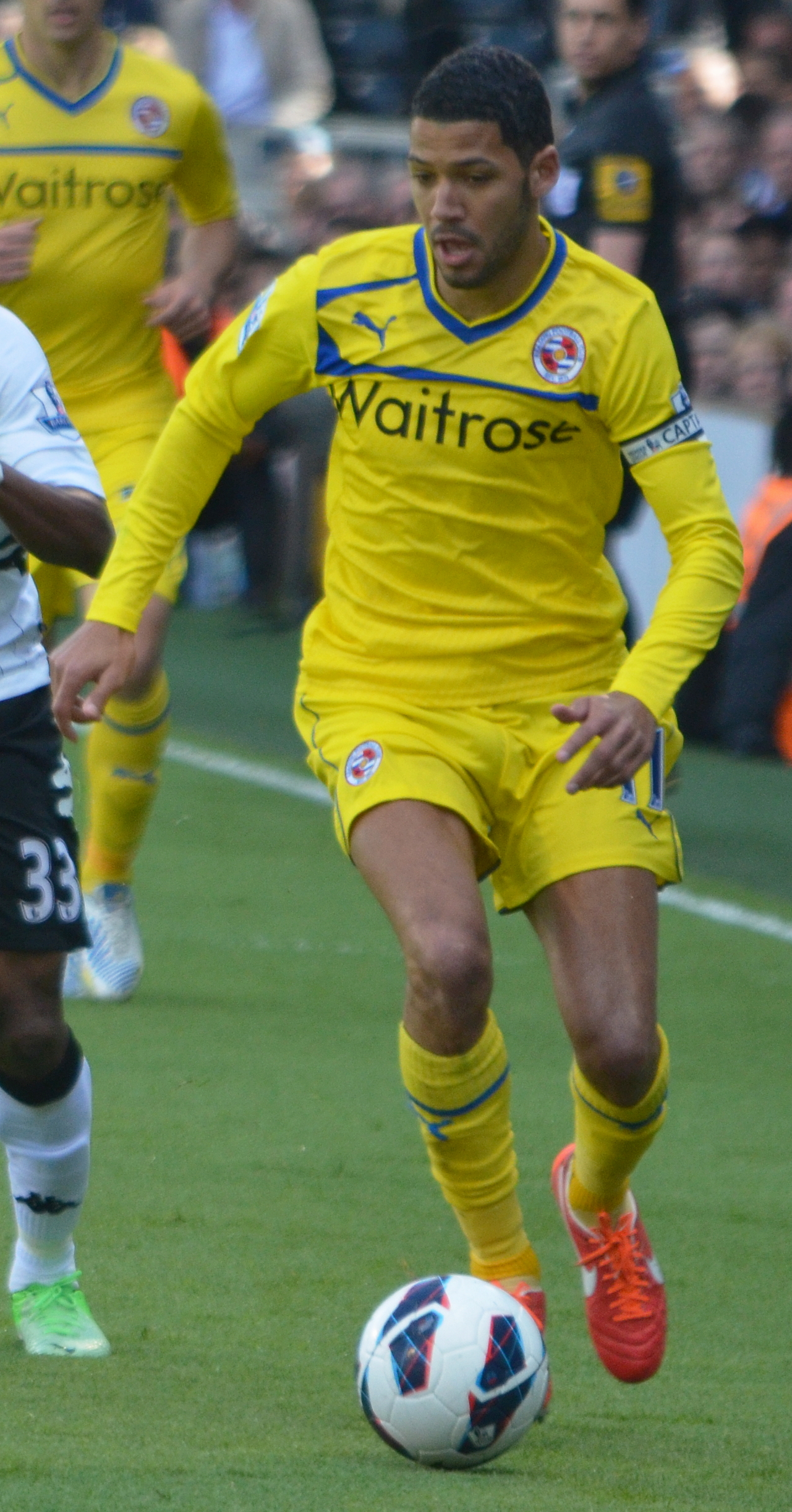
After five seasons, three as club captain, and over 200 appearances, Jobi McAnuff was among ten senior players released by the club in May.

The final game of the season was on 3 May at home to already promoted Burnley. Needing only to equal Brighton & Hove Albion's and Blackburn Rovers' result, Reading took the lead after 16 minutes when Kieran Trippier put the ball in his own net. Two goals in eight minutes gave the visitors a 2–1 lead, and with Brighton drawing at Nottingham Forest, Reading momentarily dropped out of the promotion places. A spectacular Garath McCleary volley, which later won the club's goal of the season award, levelled the match and put them back into the play-off places, but with moments left Brighton scored a winner at Forest leaving Reading just three minutes to score again which, despite late chances, they could not. The results saw Reading finish the season in seventh, one point off Brighton in sixth. Prior to the game Jordan Obita was named the club's Player of the Season in his first year as a regular, with Chris Gunter and Danny Williams coming in second and third respectively.

Three days after the end of the season, five senior players were told that they would not be offered new contracts. Captain Jobi McAnuff, as well as fellow 2011–12 promotion winners Kaspars Gorkšs and Mikele Leigertwood departed after more than 400 combined appearances, along with Stuart Taylor and Wayne Bridge, who subsequently announced his retirement from football. The following week a further five professionals left with Lawson D'Ath the only one among them to have made a first team appearance for the club. The others to leave were Nick Arnold, Shepherd Murombedzi, Matt Partridge and Gozie Ugwu. Jake Taylor and Michael Hector, who both broke into the first team during the season, making nine appearances each, were offered new contracts along with five other young professionals.

=== Under-21s and Academy ===
Prior to the season Reading announced that they had been awarded Category One Academy status under the Elite Player Performance Plan and would therefore continue to compete in Professional Development League 1. The club initially brought in three new scholars: Harry Cardwell, Lewis Collins and Tomas Urbancic, as well as competing the signings of young professionals Samúel Friðjónsson and Aleksandar Gogic whose transfers, along with Urbancic's, were agreed during the previous campaign. Reading later confirmed four further additions, including two youth internationals, along with a number of youngsters promoted from within the club. Uche Ikpeazu, the 2012–13 scholar of the year, departed after rejecting professional terms from the club and joined Watford on a three-year contract.

The under-21s began their season with a 4–2 over Newcastle United at the Madejski Stadium, Gozie Ugwu scoring twice. Despite a successful start, the team won just one of their next seven games, a 3–2 victory against Southampton with Ugwu again scoring twice, and lost the other six, including a 4–0 defeat to Wolverhampton Wanderers. Due to new rules which came into effect for the 2013–14 season, Reading could only play three games at their training ground and therefore chose to play a number of their games at Basingstoke Town's Camrose ground. In November they beat Queens Park Rangers in the first round of the inaugural U21 Premier League Cup, though, after one further league game, a 1–1 draw with Norwich City, they ended 2013 second from bottom of the table. Reading began 2014 in better form, picking up four wins from seven in the league and beating Watford, Wolves and Arsenal in the U21 Cup to advance to the final. The side faced Manchester City in the two-legged final and, despite leading 2–0 after 31 minutes through Uwgu and Craig Tanner, lost the first leg at the City of Manchester Stadium 3–2. The return leg at the Madejski saw over 3,000 watch as the under-21s won the game 2–0, giving them a 4–3 aggregate victory to win the inaugural competition. Despite the cup run, the under-21s finished the season in poor form in the league, winning two and losing four of the seven games following the semi-final win at Arsenal. The run saw the team finish 17 out of 22 teams and consigned them to Division Two of the Under-21 Premier League for 2014–15. Craig Tanner finished as the team's top scorer with 13 goals while Ugwu was in second place with 12.

In contrast to the under-21s, the under-18s began the season as they finished the last, winning seven of their first nine games and losing just twice. After a winless November, Reading beat Norwich 3–0 in the league before progressing to the fourth round of the FA Youth Cup with a 3–1 win over Leeds United. The year ended on a bad note after a 6–0 loss to Chelsea, though away from the pitch there was good news with four second year scholars: Dominic Hyam, Liam Kelly, Aaron Kuhl and Jack Stacey, all signing their first professional contracts, tying each of them to the club until summer 2016. In the league, Reading's indifferent form continued throughout January and February with just two wins from seven, though in the Youth Cup, victories over Crewe Alexandra and Accrington Stanley ensured progress into the quarter-finals. The under-18s took on Liverpool at the Madejski Stadium in the last eight and, with the game finishing 4–4 after extra time, required a 5–4 win in the resulting penalty shoot-out to reach the last four of the Youth Cup for the first time in their history. The side faced Fulham in the semi-final with the first leg finishing in a 2–2 draw at the Madejski Stadium. In the return leg at Craven Cottage Reading found themselves leading thanks to goals from Tarique Fosu-Henry and Jack Stacey, though a last minute Moussa Dembélé strike gave Fulham a 3–2 win on the night and a 5–4 aggregate victory. After the cup exit the side won three of their last four games to finish third in the South Group of the Under-18 Premier League. With nine goals each, Harry Cardwell and Liam Kelly were the Academy's joint top scorers. Of the six players whose futures were uncertain upon the conclusion of the season, three: Nana Owusu, George McLennan and Rob Dickie were offered their first professional contracts while the others were released.

== Transfers ==
=== In ===
Date	Position	Nationality	Name	From	Fee	Ref.
7 June 2013 †	DF	(England)	Wayne Bridge	Manchester City	Free	
21 June 2013	MF	(Netherlands)	Royston Drenthe	Alania Vladikavkaz	Free	
25 June 2013 †	MF	(United States)	Danny Williams	Hoffenheim	Undisclosed	
20 September 2013	MF	(Northern Ireland)	Chris Baird	Fulham	Free	

† Bridge's and Williams' transfers were announced on the above dates but were not finalised until 1 July.

=== Loans in ===
Start date	Position	Nationality	Name	From	End date	Ref.
26 September 2013	FW	(England)	Billy Sharp	Southampton	2 January 2014	

=== Out ===
Date	Position	Nationality	Name	To	Fee	Ref.
31 August 2013	MF	(Mali) (Note: Kébé was born in Vitry-sur-Seine, France, but qualified to represent Mali internationally and made his international debut for Mali in 2004.)	Jimmy Kébé	Crystal Palace	Undisclosed	
2 September 2013	DF	(Jamaica) (Note: Mariappa was born in Harrow, London, England, but qualified to represent Jamaica internationally through his mother and made his international debut for the Jamaican team in May 2012 against Guyana.)	Adrian Mariappa	Crystal Palace	Undisclosed	
6 December 2013	FW	(Republic of Ireland)	Karl Sheppard	Shamrock Rovers	Free	

=== Loans out ===
Start date	Position	Nationality	Name	To	End date	Ref.
11 June 2013	GK	(Denmark)	Mikkel Andersen	Randers	Season-long	
14 June 2013	RB	(England)	Nick Arnold	Wycombe Wanderers	Season-long	
16 July 2013	MF	(Australia)	Ryan Edwards	Perth Glory	Season-long	
17 July 2013	MF	(Portugal)	Daniel Carriço	Sevilla	Season-long	
26 July 2013	CB	(England)	Michael Hector	Aberdeen	5 January 2014	
16 August 2013	GK	(England)	Daniel Lincoln	Metropolitan Police	16 September 2013	
20 September 2013	DF	(England)	Matt Partridge	Basingstoke Town	21 November 2013	
24 September 2013	GK	(England)	Daniel Lincoln	Harrow Borough	25 October 2013	
31 October 2013	GK	(Scotland)	Jonathan Henly	Aldershot Town	2 January 2014	
14 November 2013	FW	(England)	Gozie Ugwu	Shrewsbury Town	2 January 2014	
18 November 2013	GK	(England)	Stuart Taylor	Yeovil Town	20 November 2013	
28 November 2013	MF	(England)	Lawson D'Ath	Dagenham & Redbridge	End of the season	
6 December 2013	MF	(Zimbabwe)	Shepherd Murombedzi	Bognor Regis Town	6 January 2014	
28 December 2013	GK	(England)	Daniel Lincoln	Farnborough	Short-term youth	
28 December 2013	DF	(England)	Matt Partridge	Basingstoke Town	End of the season	
9 January 2014	FW	(England)	Dominic Samuel	Dagenham & Redbridge	12 January 2014	
10 January 2014	GK	(Scotland)	Jonathan Henly	Oxford United	10 March 2014	
17 February 2014	GK	(England)	Stuart Moore	Gloucester City	20 March 2014	
20 February 2014	DF	(Georgia (country))	Lasha Dvali	Skonto	31 January 2015	
28 March 2014	GK	(England)	Stuart Moore	Bath City	End of the season	
30 March 2014	GK	(Scotland)	Jonathan Henly	Maidenhead United	End of the season	

=== Released ===
Date	Position	Nationality	Name	Joined	Date	Ref
20 January 2014	MF	(Northern Ireland)	Chris Baird	Burnley	20 March 2014	
20 March 2014	FW	(Grenada) (Note: Roberts was born in Brent, England, but qualified to represent Grenada internationally through his father and made his international debut in 1999.)	Jason Roberts	Retired		
6 May 2014	GK	(England)	Stuart Taylor	Leeds United	3 July 2014	
6 May 2014	DF	(Latvia)	Kaspars Gorkšs	Colchester United	7 December 2014	
6 May 2014	DF	(England)	Wayne Bridge	Retired		
6 May 2014	MF	(Antigua and Barbuda)	Mikele Leigertwood	Retired		
6 May 2014	MF	(Jamaica)	Jobi McAnuff	Leyton Orient	25 July 2014	
12 May 2014	DF	(England)	Nick Arnold	Woking	22 August 2014	
12 May 2014	MF	(England)	Lawson D'Ath	Northampton Town	7 August 2014	
12 May 2014	FW	(England)	Gozie Ugwu	Dunfermline Athletic	2 August 2014	
14 May 2014	DF	(England)	Matt Partridge	Dagenham & Redbridge	8 July 2014	
14 May 2014	MF	(Zimbabwe)	Shepherd Murombedzi	Banbury United		

== Squad ==
As of match played 3 May 2014

No.	Name	Nationality	Position	Date of birth (Age (Note: Age as of the end of the season))	Signed from	Signed in	Contract ends	Apps.	Goals
Goalkeepers
1	Adam Federici	(Australia)	GK	31 January 1985 (aged 29)	Torres	2005	2015	196	1
21	Alex McCarthy	(England)	GK	3 December 1989 (aged 24)	Academy	2007	2015	74	0
31	Mikkel Andersen	(Denmark)	GK	17 December 1988 (aged 25)	AB Copenhagen	2007	2015	0	0
41	Stuart Taylor	(England)	GK	28 November 1980 (aged 33)	Manchester City	2012	2014	4	0
42	Jonathan Henly	(Scotland)	GK	7 June 1994 (aged 19)	Academy	2012	2015	0	0
43	Daniel Lincoln	(England)	GK	26 May 1995 (aged 18)	Academy	2013	2014	0	0
51	Stuart Moore	(England)	GK	8 September 1994 (aged 19)	Academy	2013	2014	0	0
Defenders
2	Chris Gunter	(Wales)	RB	21 July 1989 (aged 24)	Nottingham Forest	2012	2015	69	1
3	Stephen Kelly	(Republic of Ireland)	RB	6 September 1983 (aged 30)	Fulham	2013	2015	34	1
5	Alex Pearce (Note: Pearce was born in Oxford, England, but qualified to represent Scotland and the Republic of Ireland internationally through his parents and made his international debut for the Scottish U-21 side in May 2008, then went on to represent Ireland at full international level on 11 September 2012.)	(Republic of Ireland)	CB	9 November 1988 (aged 25)	Academy	2006	2015	191	15
15	Sean Morrison	(England)	CB	8 January 1991 (aged 23)	Swindon Town	2011	2017	43	4
17	Kaspars Gorkšs	(Latvia)	CB	6 November 1981 (aged 32)	QPR	2011	2014	87	8
18	Wayne Bridge	(England)	LB	5 August 1980 (aged 33)	Manchester City	2013	2014	12	0
24	Shaun Cummings (Note: Cummings was born in Hammersmith, England, but qualified to represent Jamaica and made his international debut for Jamaica in September 2013.)	(Jamaica)	RB	25 February 1989 (aged 25)	Chelsea	2009	2015	79	0
32	Nick Arnold	(England)	RB	3 July 1993 (aged 20)	Academy	2011	2014	0	0
34	Niall Keown	(England)	RB	5 April 1995 (aged 19)	Academy	2013		0	0
35	Michael Hector (Note: Hector was born in East Ham, England, but qualified to represent Jamaica and made his international debut for Jamaica in June 2015.)	(England)	CB	19 July 1992 (aged 21)	Academy	2010	2014	9	0
46	Matt Partridge	(England)	CB	7 November 1993 (aged 20)	Academy	2012	2014	0	0
47	Pierce Sweeney	(Republic of Ireland)	CB	11 September 1994 (aged 19)	Bray Wanderers	2012		0	0
49	Sean Long	(Republic of Ireland)	RB	2 April 1995 (aged 19)	Academy	2013	2014	0	0
50	Jake Cooper	(England)	CB	3 February 1995 (aged 19)	Academy	2013	2016	0	0
53	Shane Griffin	(Republic of Ireland)	LB	8 September 1994 (aged 19)	Academy	2013	2014	0	0
Midfielders
4	Jem Karacan (Note: Karacan was born in Lewisham, England, but also qualifies to represent Turkey internationally through his father and has represented Turkey at every youth level.)	(Turkey)	CM	21 February 1989 (aged 25)	Academy	2007	2015	166	11
8	Mikele Leigertwood (Note: Leigertwood was born in Enfield, England, but qualified to represent Antigua and Barbuda and made his international debut for Antigua and Barbuda in November 2008.)	(Antigua and Barbuda)	CM	12 November 1982 (aged 31)	QPR	2011	2014	109	10
10	Royston Drenthe	(Netherlands)	MF	8 April 1987 (aged 27)	Alania Vladikavkaz	2013	2015	24	2
11	Jobi McAnuff (Note: McAnuff was born in Enfield, England, but qualified to represent Jamaica and made his international debut for Jamaica in May 2002.)	(Jamaica)	LW	9 November 1981 (aged 32)	Watford	2009	2014	206	16
12	Garath McCleary (Note: McCleary was born in Oxford, England, but qualified to represent Jamaica and made his international debut for Jamaica in February 2013.)	(Jamaica)	RW	15 May 1987 (aged 26)	Nottingham Forest	2012	2015	80	9
16	Hope Akpan	(England)	CM	14 August 1991 (aged 22)	Crawley Town	2013	2016	39	1
19	Hal Robson-Kanu (Note: Robson-Kanu was born in Ealing, England, and represented England at U-19 and U-20 level, but also qualified to represent Wales through his grandmother and made his international debut for the Welsh U-21 side in May 2010 before making his full international debut for Wales five days later.)	(Wales)	LW	21 May 1989 (aged 24)	Academy	2007	2016	156	21
20	Danny Guthrie	(England)	CM	18 April 1987 (aged 27)	Newcastle United	2012	2015	58	5
23	Danny Williams (Note: Williams was born in Karlsruhe, Germany, and represented Germany at U-15 level. Williams also qualified to play for the United States through his parents, and made his debut for them in October 2011.)	(United States)	CM	8 March 1989 (aged 25)	Hoffenheim	2013	2017	32	3
25	Jake Taylor (Note: Taylor was born in Ascot, England, and but chose to represent Wales, qualifying through his grandfather who has born in Barry. Taylor has represented Wales at U-17, U-19 and U-21 level.)	(Wales)	MF	1 December 1991 (aged 22)	Academy	2009	2014	11	0
29	Daniel Carriço	(Portugal)	CM	4 August 1988 (aged 25)	Sporting CP	2013	2015	3	0
37	Jordan Obita	(England) (Note: Obita was born in Oxford, England, but qualified to represent Uganda and made his international debut for Uganda in June 2025.)	MF	8 December 1993 (aged 20)	Academy	2010	2017	38	1
38	Aaron Tshibola	(England) (Note: Tshibola was born in Beckton, England, but qualified to represent Democratic Republic of the Congo and made his international debut for DR Congo in March 2018.)	CM	2 January 1995 (aged 19)	Academy	2013	2014	0	0
40	Lawson D'Ath	(England)	MF	24 December 1992 (aged 21)	Academy	2010	2014	1	0
45	Ryan Edwards	(Australia)	MF	17 November 1993 (aged 20)	Australian Institute of Sport	2011	2015	0	0
55	Shepherd Murombedzi	(Zimbabwe)	MF	15 November 1994 (aged 19)	Academy	2013	2014	0	0
	Samúel Friðjónsson	(Iceland)	MF	22 February 1996 (aged 18)	Academy	2013	2015	0	0
Forwards
7	Pavel Pogrebnyak	(Russia)	FW	8 November 1983 (aged 30)	Fulham	2012	2016	75	21
9	Adam Le Fondre	(England)	FW	2 December 1986 (aged 27)	Rotherham United	2011	2015	110	41
22	Nick Blackman	(England)	FW	11 November 1989 (aged 24)	Sheffield United	2013	2016	41	4
36	Gozie Ugwu	(England)	FW	22 April 1993 (aged 21)	Academy	2011	2014	0	0
39	Craig Tanner	(England)	FW	27 October 1994 (aged 19)	Academy	2013	2015	0	0
44	Dominic Samuel	(England)	FW	1 April 1994 (aged 20)	Academy	2012	2014	1	0

=== Left club during season ===
Note: Flags indicate national team as defined under FIFA eligibility rules; some limited exceptions apply. Players may hold more than one non-FIFA nationality.

No.	Pos.	Nation	Player
6	DF	JAM	Adrian Mariappa (to Crystal Palace)
6	MF	NIR	Chris Baird (to Burnley)
14	MF	MLI	Jimmy Kébé (to Crystal Palace)

No.	Pos.	Nation	Player
14	FW	ENG	Billy Sharp (returned to Southampton after loan)
33	FW	GRN	Jason Roberts (Retired)
49	FW	IRL	Karl Sheppard (to Shamrock Rovers)

== Friendlies ==
13 July 2013	Reading	3–1	Wycombe Wanderers	Reading
15:00 BST (UTC+1)	Le Fondre 17'; Pogrebnyak 77'; Williams 90'	Reading FC	Morgan 65' (pen.)	Stadium: Hogwood Park; Attendance: Behind Closed Doors

16 July 2013	(Portugal) Belenenses	1–1	Reading	Lisbon
20:00 BST (UTC+1)	Fredy 33' (pen.)	Reading FC	Le Fondre 88'	Stadium: Restelo Stadium

19 July 2013	(Portugal) Olhanense	1–5	Reading	Rio Maior
20:00 BST (UTC+1)	Pele 12'	Reading FC	Le Fondre 29'; Gorkšs 40'; Drenthe 56'; McCleary 70'; Obita 79'	Stadium: Rio Maior Sports Complex

24 July 2013	Bristol City	1–0	Reading	Bristol
19:45 BST (UTC+1)	Adomah 82'	Reading FC		Stadium: Ashton Gate; Attendance: 2,418

27 July 2013	Reading	0–3	Swansea City	Reading
15:00 BST (UTC+1)		Reading FC	Michu 11'; Shelvey 56'; Hernández 59'	Stadium: Madejski Stadium; Attendance: 6,810; Referee: I Williamson

28 July 2013	Bristol Rovers	2–1	Reading	Bristol
15:00 BST (UTC+1)	Richards 21'; Clarkson 45'	Reading FC	McCleary 67'	Stadium: Memorial Stadium; Attendance: 1,738; Referee: Simon Hooper

7 September 2013	Reading	0–2	Oman	Reading
15:00 BST (UTC+1)		Reading FC	Al-Ajmi 34'; A.Al-Busaidi 83'	Stadium: Madejski Stadium

=== Overall record ===
Competition	First match	Last match	Starting round	Final position	Record							
Competition	First match	Last match	Starting round	Final position	Pld	W	D	L	GF	GA	GD	Win %
Championship	3 August 2013	3 May 2014	Matchday 1	7th	46	19	14	13	70	56	+14	41.30
FA Cup	4 January 2014	4 January 2014	Third round	Third round	1	0	0	1	0	1	−1	0.00
League Cup	27 August 2013	27 August 2013	Second round	Second round	1	0	0	1	0	6	−6	0.00
Total					48	19	14	15	70	63	+7	39.58

Last updated: 3 May 2014
Source: Soccerway

=== Championship ===
==== League table ====
Pos	Team	Pld	W	D	L	GF	GA	GD	Pts	Promotion, qualification or relegation
5	Wigan Athletic	46	21	10	15	61	48	+13	73	Qualification for Championship play-offs
6	Brighton & Hove Albion	46	19	15	12	55	40	+15	72	Qualification for Championship play-offs
7	Reading	46	19	14	13	70	56	+14	71	
8	Blackburn Rovers	46	18	16	12	70	62	+8	70	
9	Ipswich Town	46	18	14	14	60	54	+6	68	

Source: BBC Sport
Rules for classification: 1) points; 2) goal difference; 3) number of goals scored

==== Results summary ====
Overall								Home						Away					
Pld	W	D	L	GF	GA	GD	Pts	W	D	L	GF	GA	GD	W	D	L	GF	GA	GD
46	19	14	13	70	56	+14	71	8	10	5	38	25	+13	11	4	8	32	31	+1

Last updated: 4 May 2014.
Source: Reading FC

==== Matches ====
3 August 2013 1	Reading	2–1	Ipswich Town	Reading
15:00 BST (UTC+1)	Le Fondre 45+1'; Guthrie 75'	BBC; Reading F.C.	Tabb 16'	Stadium: Madejski Stadium; Attendance: 20,546; Referee: David Coote

10 August 2013 2	Bolton Wanderers	1–1	Reading	Bolton
15:00 BST (UTC+1)	Pratley 14'	BBC; Reading F.C.	Blackman 51' (pen.)	Stadium: Reebok Stadium; Attendance: 15,551; Referee: Carl Boyeson

17 August 2013 3	Reading	3–3	Watford	Reading
15:00 BST (UTC+1)	Le Fondre 8'; Karacan 42', 70'	BBC; Reading F.C.	Forestieri 66'; Deeney 76' (pen.); Fabbrini 90'	Stadium: Madejski Stadium; Attendance: 20,875; Referee: Michael Jones

24 August 2013 4	Blackpool	1–0	Reading	Blackpool
15:00 BST (UTC+1)	Barkhuizen 75'	BBC; Reading F.C.		Stadium: Bloomfield Road; Attendance: 12,928; Referee: David Webb

31 August 2013 5	Yeovil Town	0–1	Reading	Yeovil
15:00 BST (UTC+1)		BBC; Reading F.C.	Le Fondre 77' (pen.)	Stadium: Huish Park; Attendance: 7,306; Referee: Trevor Kettle

15 September 2013 6	Reading	0–0	Brighton & Hove Albion	Reading
13:15 BST (UTC+1)	Pogrebnyak (yellow card) 26' (yellow-red card) 32'	BBC; Reading F.C.	Ulloa (red card) 39'	Stadium: Madejski Stadium; Attendance: 18,306; Referee: Graham Scott

18 September 2013 7	Reading	1–0	Leeds United	Reading
20:00 BST (UTC+1)	Le Fondre 90+6'	BBC; Reading F.C.	Warnock (yellow card) 45+2' (yellow-red card) 90+5'	Stadium: Madejski Stadium; Attendance: 21,167; Referee: Neil Swarbrick

21 September 2013 8	Derby County	1–3	Reading	Derby
15:00 BST (UTC+1)	Hughes 80'	BBC; Reading F.C.	Pogrebnyak 47', 62'; Blackman 90+5'	Stadium: Pride Park; Attendance: 21,465; Referee: Tim Robinson

28 September 2013 9	Reading	2–0	Birmingham City	Reading
15:00 BST (UTC+1)	Guthrie 32', 76'	BBC; Reading F.C.		Stadium: Madejski Stadium; Attendance: 18,252; Referee: James Adcock

1 October 2013 10	Barnsley	1–1	Reading	Barnsley
19:45 BST (UTC+1)	O'Grady 79'	BBC; Reading F.C.	Robson-Kanu 51'	Stadium: Oakwell; Attendance: 9,084; Referee: Chris Sarginson

5 October 2013 11	Burnley	2–1	Reading	Burnley
15:00 BST (UTC+1)	Ings 21'; Vokes 80'	BBC; Reading F.C.	Shackell 82' (o.g.)	Stadium: Turf Moor; Attendance: 11,256; Referee: Michael Jones

19 October 2013 12	Reading	4–1	Doncaster Rovers	Reading
15:00 BST (UTC+1)	Guthrie 11'; Le Fondre 39'; McCleary 80'; Pogrebnyak 90+7'	BBC; Reading F.C.	Robinson 31'	Stadium: Madejski Stadium; Attendance: 17,697; Referee: Andy D'Urso

26 October 2013 13	Reading	1–1	Millwall	Reading
15:00 BST (UTC+1)	Morrison 9'	BBC; Reading F.C.	Abdou (yellow card) 42' (yellow-red card) 85'; Trotter 90+2' (pen.)	Stadium: Madejski Stadium; Attendance: 18,245; Referee: David Phillips

2 November 2013 14	Sheffield Wednesday	5–2	Reading	Sheffield
15:00 GMT (UTC)	Fryatt 18', 62'; Antonio 25'; Morrison 42' (o.g.); Wickham 57'	BBC; Reading F.C.	Pogrebnyak 35'; Le Fondre 90' (pen.)	Stadium: Hillsborough; Attendance: 20,368; Referee: Eddie Ilderton

9 November 2013 15	Reading	1–1	Queens Park Rangers	Reading
12:45 GMT (UTC)	McCleary 62'	BBC; Reading F.C.	Barton 78'	Stadium: Madejski Stadium; Attendance: 21,497; Referee: Anthony Taylor

23 November 2013 16	Blackburn Rovers	0–0	Reading	Blackburn
15:00 GMT (UTC)		BBC; Reading F.C.		Stadium: Ewood Park; Attendance: 12,903; Referee: Geoff Eltringham

29 November 2013 17	Nottingham Forest	2–3	Reading	Nottingham
19:45 GMT (UTC)	Cox 40'; Henderson 60'	BBC; Reading F.C.	Pogrebnyak 8'; Gorkšs 13'; Obita 74'; Gunter (yellow card) 54' (yellow-red card) 81'	Stadium: The City Ground; Attendance: 21,199; Referee: Stuart Attwell

3 December 2013 18	Reading	1–0	Charlton Athletic	Reading
20:00 GMT (UTC)	Sharp 13'	BBC; Reading F.C.		Stadium: Madejski Stadium; Attendance: 18,149; Referee: Darren Sheldrake

7 December 2013 19	Reading	1–2	Bournemouth	Reading
15:00 GMT (UTC)	Le Fondre 90+1'	BBC; Reading F.C.	Grabban 37'; Ritchie 41'	Stadium: Madejski Stadium; Attendance: 20,944; Referee: David Coote

14 December 2013 20	Huddersfield Town	0–1	Reading	Huddersfield
15:00 GMT (UTC)	Lynch (yellow card) 87' (yellow-red card) 90+5'	BBC; Reading F.C.	Sharp 32'	Stadium: John Smith's Stadium; Attendance: 13,572; Referee: Oliver Langford

21 December 2013 21	Reading	1–2	Wigan Athletic	Reading
15:00 GMT (UTC)	Pogrebnyak 68'	BBC; Reading F.C.	McCann 10'; Powell 12'	Stadium: Madejski Stadium; Attendance: 18,336; Referee: Gary Sutton

26 December 2013 22	Leicester City	1–0	Reading	Leicester
15:00 GMT (UTC)	Nugent 21' (pen.)	BBC; Reading F.C.		Stadium: King Power Stadium; Attendance: 26,722; Referee: Michael Naylor

29 December 2013 23	Middlesbrough	3–0	Reading	Middlesbrough
15:00 GMT (UTC)	Adomah 12'; Leadbitter 36', 82' (pen.)	BBC; Reading F.C.	Gorkšs (yellow card) 33' (yellow-red card) 52'	Stadium: Riverside Stadium; Attendance: 16,001; Referee: Paul Tierney

1 January 2014 24	Reading	1–1	Nottingham Forest	Reading
15:00 GMT (UTC)	Kelly 90+5'	BBC; Reading F.C.	Halford 36'	Stadium: Madejski Stadium; Attendance: 19,873; Referee: Michael Oliver

11 January 2014 25	Watford	0–1	Reading	Watford
15:00 GMT (UTC)	Merkel (yellow card) 42' (red card) 90+4'	BBC; Reading F.C.	Gorkšs 5'	Stadium: Vicarage Road; Attendance: 15,725; Referee: Keith Stroud

18 January 2014 26	Reading	7–1	Bolton Wanderers	Reading
15:00 GMT (UTC)	Le Fondre 12', 28', 33'; Pogrebnyak 41' (pen.); Gorkšs 60'; Akpan 74'; Blackman 78'	BBC; Reading F.C.	Ngog 88'	Stadium: Madejski Stadium; Attendance: 18,629; Referee: Andy Davies

25 January 2014 27	Ipswich Town	2–0	Reading	Ipswich
15:00 GMT (UTC)	Murphy 62'; Anderson 90'	BBC; Reading F.C.		Stadium: Portman Road; Attendance: 15,323; Referee: Andy Madley

28 January 2014 28	Reading	5–1	Blackpool	Reading
19:45 GMT (UTC)	Le Fondre 7', 17', 67'; Pogrebnyak 52'; Robson-Kanu 82'	BBC; Reading F.C.	Davies 65'	Stadium: Madejski Stadium; Attendance: 16,636; Referee: Kevin Friend

1 February 2014 29	Millwall	0–3	Reading	South Bermondsey
15:00 GMT (UTC)		BBC; Reading F.C.	Pogrebnyak 39'; Pearce 72'; Williams 76'	Stadium: The Den; Attendance: 11,174; Referee: Darren Sheldrake

8 February 2014 30	Reading	0–2	Sheffield Wednesday	Reading
15:00 GMT (UTC)	Pearce (red card) 9'	BBC; Reading F.C.	Maguire 10' (pen.); Afobe 52'	Stadium: Madejski Stadium; Attendance: 19,772; Referee: Keith Hill

16 February 2014 31	Queens Park Rangers	1–3	Reading	White City
15:30 GMT (UTC)	Doyle 20'	BBC; Reading F.C.	Williams 10'; Pearce 56'; McCleary 58'; Gorkšs (red card) 71'	Stadium: Loftus Road; Attendance: 16,522; Referee: David Coote

22 February 2014 32	Reading	0–1	Blackburn Rovers	Reading
15:00 GMT (UTC)		BBC; Reading F.C.	Conway 36'	Stadium: Madejski Stadium; Attendance: 18,858; Referee: Graham Scott

1 March 2014 33	Reading	1–1	Yeovil Town	Reading
15:00 GMT (UTC)	Lundstram 69' (o.g.)	BBC; Reading F.C.	Duffy 20'; Webster (red card) 65'; Ralls (red card) 71'; Moore (yellow card) 87' (yellow-red card) 88'	Stadium: Madejski Stadium; Attendance: 18,697; Referee: Scott Mathieson

8 March 2014 34	Brighton & Hove Albion	1–1	Reading	Brighton & Hove
15:00 GMT (UTC)	Gunter 16' (o.g.); Greer (yellow card) 36' (yellow-red card) 51'	BBC; Reading F.C.	Drenthe 64'	Stadium: Falmer Stadium; Attendance: 27,532; Referee: Fred Graham

11 March 2014 35	Leeds United	2–4	Reading	Leeds
20:15 GMT (UTC)	M.Smith 63'; Austin 64'	BBC; Reading F.C.	McCleary 25'; Drenthe 46'; Blackman 48'; Robson-Kanu 54'	Stadium: Elland Road; Attendance: 19,915; Referee: Oliver Langford

15 March 2014 36	Reading	0–0	Derby County	Reading
15:00 GMT (UTC)		BBC; Reading F.C.		Stadium: Madejski Stadium; Attendance: 19,514; Referee: Michael Jones

22 March 2014 37	Birmingham City	1–2	Reading	Birmingham
15:00 GMT (UTC)	Caddis 43' (pen.)	BBC; Reading F.C.	McAnuff 39', 82'	Stadium: St Andrew's; Attendance: 13,409; Referee: Dean Whitestone

25 March 2014 38	Reading	1–3	Barnsley	Reading
19:45 GMT (UTC)	Pogrebnyak 20' (pen.)	BBC; Reading F.C.	Dawson 16'; Noble-Lazarus 53'; Jennings 57'	Stadium: Madejski Stadium; Attendance: 16,645; Referee: Steve Martin

29 March 2014 39	Reading	1–1	Huddersfield Town	Reading
15:00 GMT (UTC)	Pogrebnyak 7' (pen.)	BBC; Reading F.C.	Wells 4'	Stadium: Madejski Stadium; Attendance: 17,649; Referee: Keith Stroud

5 April 2014 40	Charlton Athletic	0–1	Reading	Charlton
15:00 BST (UTC+1)		BBC; Reading F.C.	Williams 73'	Stadium: The Valley; Attendance: 15,800; Referee: Andy Madley

8 April 2014 41	Bournemouth	3–1	Reading	Bournemouth
19:45 BST (UTC+1)	Ritchie 7', 19'; Kermorgant 45'	BBC; Reading F.C.	Robson-Kanu 75'	Stadium: Dean Court; Attendance: 11,182; Referee: Andy Woolmer

14 April 2014 42	Reading	1–1	Leicester City	Reading
20:07 BST (UTC+1) (Note: All matches in leagues across England kicked off seven minutes late over this weekend to mark the 25th anniversary of the Hillsborough disaster.)	Pearce 16'; Leigertwood (yellow card) 74' (yellow-red card) 87'	BBC; Reading F.C.	Drinkwater 33'	Stadium: Madejski Stadium; Attendance: 20,072; Referee: Simon Hooper

18 April 2014 43	Wigan Athletic	3–0	Reading	Wigan
15:00 BST (UTC+1)	Gómez 30'; Waghorn 42'; McManaman 51'	BBC; Reading F.C.		Stadium: DW Stadium; Attendance: 14,609; Referee: Craig Pawson

22 April 2014 44	Reading	2–0	Middlesbrough	Reading
20:00 BST (UTC+1)	Le Fondre 9'; Friend 14' (o.g.)	BBC; Reading F.C.		Stadium: Madejski Stadium; Attendance: 17,228; Referee: James Adcock

26 April 2014 45	Doncaster Rovers	1–3	Reading	Doncaster
15:00 BST (UTC+1)	Coppinger 25'	BBC; Reading F.C.	Le Fondre 63' (pen.); Pogrebnyak 86', 90+5'	Stadium: Keepmoat Stadium; Attendance: 10,212; Referee: Anthony Taylor

3 May 2014 46	Reading	2–2	Burnley	Reading
15:00 BST (UTC+1)	Trippier 16' (o.g.); McCleary 58'	BBC; Reading F.C.	Arfield 20'; Ings 28'	Stadium: Madejski Stadium; Attendance: 23,335; Referee: Mick Russell

=== League Cup ===
27 August 2013 Second round	Peterborough United	6–0	Reading	Peterborough
19:45 BST (UTC+1)	Assombalonga 4'; Tomlin 19', 54' (pen.), 79' (pen.); Swanson 28'; Payne 90+3'	BBC; Reading F.C.		Stadium: London Road; Attendance: 4,496; Referee: Keith Hill

=== FA Cup ===
4 January 2014 Third round	Brighton & Hove Albion	1–0	Reading	Brighton
15:00 GMT (UTC)	Crofts 32'	BBC; Reading F.C.		Stadium: Falmer Stadium; Attendance: 20,696; Referee: Chris Foy

== Squad statistics ==
=== Appearances and goals ===
As of Match played 3 May 2014

No.	Pos	Nat	Player	Total		Championship		FA Cup		League Cup	
No.	Pos	Nat	Player	Apps	Goals	Apps	Goals	Apps	Goals	Apps	Goals
1	GK	(Australia) AUS	Adam Federici	4	0	2	0	1	0	1	0
2	DF	(Wales) WAL	Chris Gunter	46	0	44	0	1	0	1	0
3	DF	(Republic of Ireland) IRL	Stephen Kelly	16	1	10+5	1	1	0	0	0
4	MF	(Turkey) TUR	Jem Karacan	7	2	7	2	0	0	0	0
5	DF	(Republic of Ireland) IRL	Alex Pearce	46	3	45	3	1	0	0	0
7	FW	(Russia) RUS	Pavel Pogrebnyak	42	13	35+5	13	0+1	0	1	0
8	MF	(Antigua and Barbuda) ANT	Mikele Leigertwood	4	0	2+2	0	0	0	0	0
9	FW	(England) ENG	Adam Le Fondre	40	15	25+13	15	1	0	1	0
10	MF	(Netherlands) NED	Royston Drenthe	24	2	17+6	2	0+1	0	0	0
11	MF	(Jamaica) JAM	Jobi McAnuff	35	2	28+7	2	0	0	0	0
12	MF	(Jamaica) JAM	Garath McCleary	43	5	35+7	5	1	0	0	0
15	DF	(England) ENG	Sean Morrison	21	1	21	1	0	0	0	0
16	MF	(England) ENG	Hope Akpan	30	1	17+12	1	0	0	1	0
17	DF	(Latvia) LAT	Kaspars Gorkšs	27	3	24+1	3	1	0	1	0
18	DF	(England) ENG	Wayne Bridge	12	0	11+1	0	0	0	0	0
19	MF	(Wales) WAL	Hal Robson-Kanu	37	4	19+17	4	0	0	1	0
20	MF	(England) ENG	Danny Guthrie	33	4	29+3	4	1	0	0	0
21	GK	(England) ENG	Alex McCarthy	44	0	44	0	0	0	0	0
22	FW	(England) ENG	Nick Blackman	31	4	9+21	4	1	0	0	0
23	MF	(United States) USA	Danny Williams	32	3	24+6	3	0+1	0	1	0
24	DF	(Jamaica) JAM	Shaun Cummings	12	0	8+3	0	0	0	1	0
25	MF	(Wales) WAL	Jake Taylor	9	0	0+8	0	1	0	0	0
35	DF	(England) ENG	Michael Hector	9	0	4+5	0	0	0	0	0
37	MF	(England) ENG	Jordan Obita	36	1	33+1	1	1	0	1	0
Players who appeared for Reading but left during the season:
6	DF	(Jamaica) JAM	Adrian Mariappa	1	0	0	0	0	0	1	0
6	MF	(Northern Ireland) NIR	Chris Baird	9	0	9	0	0	0	0	0
14	FW	(England) ENG	Billy Sharp	10	2	6+4	2	0	0	0	0

=== Top scorers ===
As of match played 3 May 2014

Place	Position	Nation	Number	Name	Championship	FA Cup	League Cup	Total
1	FW	(England)	9	Adam Le Fondre	15	0	0	15
2	FW	(Russia)	7	Pavel Pogrebnyak	13	0	0	13
3	MF	(Jamaica)	12	Garath McCleary	5	0	0	5
4	MF	(England)	20	Danny Guthrie	4	0	0	4
4	FW	(England)	22	Nick Blackman	4	0	0	4
4	MF	(Wales)	19	Hal Robson-Kanu	4	0	0	4
7	DF	(Latvia)	17	Kaspars Gorkšs	3	0	0	3
7	MF	(United States)	23	Danny Williams	3	0	0	3
7	DF	(Republic of Ireland)	5	Alex Pearce	3	0	0	3
10	MF	(Turkey)	4	Jem Karacan	2	0	0	2
10	FW	(England)	14	Billy Sharp	2	0	0	2
10	MF	(Netherlands)	10	Royston Drenthe	2	0	0	2
10	MF	(Jamaica)	11	Jobi McAnuff	2	0	0	2
14	DF	(England)	15	Sean Morrison	1	0	0	1
14	MF	(England)	37	Jordan Obita	1	0	0	1
14	DF	(Republic of Ireland)	3	Stephen Kelly	1	0	0	1
14	MF	(England)	16	Hope Akpan	1	0	0	1
14				Own goal	4	0	0	4
Total					70	0	0	70

=== Disciplinary record ===
As of match played 3 May 2014

Position	Nation	Number	Name	Championship		FA Cup		League Cup		Total	
Position	Nation	Number	Name	Yellow card	Red card	Yellow card	Red card	Yellow card	Red card	Yellow card	Red card
2	(Wales)	DF	Chris Gunter	5	1	0	0	0	0	5	1
3	(Republic of Ireland)	DF	Stephen Kelly	2	0	0	0	0	0	2	0
4	(Turkey)	MF	Jem Karacan	1	0	0	0	0	0	1	0
5	(Republic of Ireland)	DF	Alex Pearce	6	1	0	0	0	0	6	1
6	(Northern Ireland)	MF	Chris Baird	1	0	0	0	0	0	1	0
7	(Russia)	FW	Pavel Pogrebnyak	7	1	0	0	0	0	7	1
8	(Antigua and Barbuda)	MF	Mikele Leigertwood	2	1	0	0	0	0	2	1
9	(England)	FW	Adam Le Fondre	4	0	0	0	1	0	5	0
10	(Netherlands)	MF	Royston Drenthe	3	0	1	0	0	0	4	0
11	(Jamaica)	MF	Jobi McAnuff	9	0	0	0	0	0	9	0
12	(Jamaica)	MF	Garath McCleary	3	0	0	0	0	0	3	0
15	(England)	DF	Sean Morrison	1	0	0	0	0	0	1	0
16	(England)	MF	Hope Akpan	4	0	0	0	1	0	5	0
17	(Latvia)	DF	Kaspars Gorkšs	4	2	0	0	1	0	5	2
19	(Wales)	MF	Hal Robson-Kanu	2	0	0	0	0	0	2	0
20	(England)	MF	Danny Guthrie	10	0	0	0	0	0	10	0
22	(England)	FW	Nick Blackman	4	0	0	0	0	0	4	0
23	(United States)	MF	Danny Williams	6	0	0	0	1	0	7	0
35	(England)	DF	Michael Hector	1	0	0	0	0	0	1	0
37	(England)	MF	Jordan Obita	5	0	0	0	0	0	5	0
Total				79	6	1	0	4	0	84	6

== Awards ==
=== Player of the Month ===
Month	Name	Award
September	Danny Guthrie	Nominated
January	Adam Le Fondre	Won
