= Daniel Lincoln =

Daniel Lincoln may refer to:

- Daniel Lincoln (runner), American runner
- Dan Lincoln (cricketer), British cricketer and footballer
