= Sean Long (footballer) =

Irish footballer (born 1995)

Personal information
- Full name: Sean Martin Long
- Date of birth: 2 May 1995 (age 31)
- Place of birth: Dublin, Republic of Ireland
- Height: 5 ft 10 in (1.78 m)
- Position: Full-back

Team information
- Current team: Weston-super-Mare
- Number: 24

Youth career
- –2012: Cherry Orchard
- 2012–2013: Reading

Senior career*
Years	Team	Apps	(Gls)
2013–2017	Reading	0	(0)
2015–2016	→ Luton Town (loan)	9	(0)
2016	→ Braintree Town (loan)	9	(0)
2016–2017	→ Cambridge United (loan)	7	(0)
2017	→ Lincoln City (loan)	14	(0)
2017–2018	Lincoln City	17	(0)
2018–2024	Cheltenham Town	190	(7)
2024–2026	Forest Green Rovers	38	(0)
2026–	Weston-super-Mare	9	(0)

International career
- Republic of Ireland U16
- Republic of Ireland U17
- Republic of Ireland U18
2013–2014	Republic of Ireland U19	12	(0)
2014–2016	Republic of Ireland U21	11	(1)
- * Club domestic league appearances and goals as of 21:44, 16 September 2026 (UTC)

Sean Martin Long (born 2 May 1995) is an Irish professional footballer who plays as a full-back for National League South club Weston-super-Mare.

== Club career ==
=== Reading ===
Long joined Reading from Irish club Cherry Orchard in 2012. He made his professional debut on 26 August 2014 as a second-half substitute in a 1–0 League Cup win over Scunthorpe United.

On 16 October 2015, Long signed for League Two club Luton Town on an initial one-month loan. He made his debut for the club a day later in a 2–1 defeat away to Crawley Town. Long made four further appearances, including three in League Two and one in the FA Cup, before his loan was extended on 16 November 2015 until 2 January 2016, continuing to cover for Stephen O'Donnell, who was recovering from a double hernia injury. He returned to Reading on 5 January 2016, having made 11 appearances for the club in all competitions.

On 15 March 2016, Long signed for National League club Braintree Town on loan until the end of the season. He made his debut for the club later that day in a 0–0 draw with Gateshead. Long made nine league appearances for Braintree, helping them secure a place in the National League play-offs after a 3–0 win at home to Altrincham on 30 April 2016 and would face Grimsby Town in the semi-finals over two legs. He featured in the semi-final first leg as Braintree earned a 1–0 away win, gaining a slender advantage over their opponents. Long featured again in the semi-final second leg, as Braintree were defeated 2–0 after extra time and 2–1 on aggregate, ending their hopes of promotion.

On 9 May 2016, Long was one of 15 Reading youth-team players offered a new contract by the club, confirmation of his new deal was signed on 1 July 2016.

On 28 July 2016, following a pre-season trial, Long signed a six-month loan deal with League Two club Cambridge United. He made his debut on the opening day of 2016–17 in a 1–1 draw at home to Barnet. Long made 12 appearances and returned to Reading following the expiration of his loan spell.

=== Lincoln City ===
On 5 January 2017, Long signed a loan deal with National League club Lincoln City for the remainder of the 2016–17 season, with a view to a permanent transfer. He made his debut two days later in Lincoln's 2–2 draw away to Ipswich Town in the FA Cup third round, having entered the match as a stoppage time substitute and completed the loan spell with 19 appearances.

Reading announced that Long would be released when his contract expired at the end of the season. He was named to Lincoln's retained list for 2017–18. Long came on as a 95th-minute substitute as Lincoln beat Shrewsbury Town 1–0 at Wembley Stadium in the 2018 EFL Trophy Final on 8 April 2018.

=== Cheltenham Town ===
Long signed for League Two club Cheltenham Town on 26 June 2018 on a two-year contract, having rejected a new contract with Lincoln. He signed a one-year contract extension in September 2019. Cheltenham reached the League Two play-offs in 2019–20 with a fourth-place finish on points per game after the season was suspended in March 2020 due to the COVID-19 pandemic in the United Kingdom, and were beaten 3–2 on aggregate by Northampton Town in the semi-final. He made 22 appearances and scored two goals in 2020–21 as Cheltenham won the League Two title and promotion to League One.

On 22 May 2024, the club announced the player had rejected a new contract and would be leaving.

=== Forest Green Rovers ===
On 24 May 2024, it was confirmed that Long had signed for newly relegated National League club Forest Green Rovers.

=== Weston-super-Mare ===
Long signed for National League South club Weston-super-Mare on 8 August 2026, following a successful trial.

== International career ==
Long has represented the Republic of Ireland at under-16, under-17, under-18 and under-19 level. He made 12 appearances for the under-19 team between 2013 and 2014.

Long was called up to the under-21s for the first time in May 2015, along with Reading teammates Pierce Sweeney and Shane Griffin.

== Career statistics ==
As of the match played 26 April 2025

Appearances and goals by club, season and competition
Club	Season	League			FA Cup		League Cup		Other		Total	
Club	Season	Division	Apps	Goals	Apps	Goals	Apps	Goals	Apps	Goals	Apps	Goals
Reading	2013–14	Championship	0	0	0	0	0	0	—		0	0
Reading	2014–15	Championship	0	0	0	0	1	0	—		1	0
Reading	2015–16	Championship	0	0	—		0	0	—		0	0
Reading	2016–17	Championship	0	0	0	0	—		—		0	0
Reading	Total		0	0	0	0	1	0	—		1	0
Luton Town (loan)	2015–16	League Two	9	0	2	0	—		—		11	0
Braintree Town (loan)	2015–16	National League	9	0	—		—		2 (Note: Appearances in National League play-offs)	0	11	0
Cambridge United (loan)	2016–17	League Two	7	0	0	0	1	0	4 (Note: Appearance(s) in EFL Trophy)	0	12	0
Lincoln City (loan)	2016–17	National League	14	0	2	0	—		3 (Note: Appearance(s) in FA Trophy)	0	19	0
Lincoln City	2017–18	League Two	17	0	1	0	1	0	7 (Note: Six appearances in EFL Trophy, one in League Two play-offs)	0	26	0
Lincoln City	Total		31	0	3	0	1	0	10	0	45	0
Cheltenham Town	2018–19	League Two	5	0	0	0	0	0	1	0	6	0
Cheltenham Town	2019–20	League Two	34	1	3	0	1	0	5 (Note: Three appearances and one goal in EFL Trophy, two appearances in League Two play-offs)	1	43	2
Cheltenham Town	2020–21	League Two	22	2	1	0	0	0	0	0	23	2
Cheltenham Town	2021–22	League One	39	1	3	0	2	0	0	0	44	1
Cheltenham Town	2022–23	League One	45	1	1	0	1	0	4	0	51	1
Cheltenham Town	2023–24	League One	45	2	1	0	1	0	1	0	48	2
Cheltenham Town	Total		190	7	9	0	5	0	11	1	215	8
Forest Green Rovers	2024–25	National League	36	0	1	0	—		3	0	40	0
Career total			282	7	15	0	8	0	30	1	335	8

== Honours ==
Reading

- U21 Premier League Cup: 2013–14

Lincoln City

- National League: 2016–17
- EFL Trophy: 2017–18

Cheltenham Town

- EFL League Two: 2020–21
