= Stuart Moore (footballer) =

English footballer (born 1994)

- Moore with Wycombe Wanderers in 2026

Personal information
- Full name: Stuart John Moore
- Date of birth: 8 September 1994 (age 32)
- Place of birth: Sandown, England
- Height: 6 ft 4 in (1.94 m)
- Position: Goalkeeper

Team information
- Current team: Wycombe Wanderers
- Number: 31

Youth career
- Brading Town
- Portsmouth
- 2011–2013: Reading

Senior career*
Years	Team	Apps	(Gls)
2013–2017	Reading	0	(0)
2011–2012	→ Hungerford Town (loan)		
2012–2013	→ Bashley (loan)	31	(0)
2014	→ Gloucester City (loan)	4	(0)
2014	→ Bath City (loan)	4	(0)
2014–2015	→ Basingstoke Town (loan)	48	(0)
2016	→ Peterborough United (loan)	4	(0)
2017	→ Luton Town (loan)	10	(0)
2017–2018	Barrow	18	(0)
2018	Swindon Town	10	(0)
2018–2020	Milton Keynes Dons	6	(0)
2020–2021	Wealdstone	7	(0)
2021–2023	Blackpool	2	(0)
2023	→ Doncaster Rovers (loan)	2	(0)
2023–2025	Morecambe	27	(0)
2025–	Wycombe Wanderers	0	(0)
- * Club domestic league appearances and goals as of 09:55, 13 March 2026 (UTC)

Stuart John Moore (born 8 September 1994) is an English professional footballer who plays as a goalkeeper for Wycombe Wanderers.

He has previously played for Reading, Hungerford Town (loan), Bashley (loan), Gloucester City (loan), Bath City (loan), Basingstoke Town (loan), Peterborough United (loan), Luton Town (loan), Barrow, Swindon Town, Milton Keynes Dons, Wealdstone, Blackpool and Doncaster Rovers (loan).

== Career ==
=== Reading ===
Born in Sandown, Isle of Wight, Moore began his career in the youth system at Brading Town before moving to Portsmouth. He then joined Reading in September 2011 at the age of 16 on a two-year scholarship, culminating with a one-year professional contract. Moore joined Southern League Division One South & West club Hungerford Town on loan later that month. He debuted in a replay against Weymouth in the FA Cup second qualifying round, in which he made a number of saves, with Hungerford losing 3–1. The following season saw Moore loaned to Southern League Premier Division club Bashley, finishing the loan with 33 appearances.

On 17 February 2014, Moore joined Conference North club Gloucester City on a one-month loan. He debuted a day later in a 3–1 defeat at home to Barrow. Moore returned to Reading after being recalled from his loan on 14 March, which he finished with four appearances. He was then loaned to Conference South club Bath City on 27 March until the end of 2013–14. Moore made his league debut on 5 April in a 2–1 victory at home to Eastbourne Borough. He was sent off in the 63rd minute of a 3–1 defeat away to Gosport Borough on 19 April for raising his arm in the direction of a Gosport player, which resulted in his suspension for Bath's final matches of the season. Moore completed the loan spell with four appearances. He signed a new one-year contract with Reading ahead of 2014–15. On 7 August 2014, Moore joined Conference South club Basingstoke Town on a season-long loan. He debuted on 23 August in a 2–0 win at home to Hayes & Yeading United. Moore completed the loan spell with 48 appearances, which included both legs of the play-off semi-final defeat to Whitehawk, losing 2–1 on aggregate. He was named as Basingstoke's Player of the Year, voted for by the club's supporters.

On 27 February 2016, Moore joined League One club Peterborough United on a 28-day emergency loan. He debuted later that day in a 2–1 defeat at home to Swindon Town, finishing the loan with four appearances. On 31 January 2017, Moore joined League Two club Luton Town on loan until the end of 2016–17. He debuted later that day in Luton's 3–2 defeat at home to Cheltenham Town. Moore played in both legs of the play-off semi-final defeat to Blackpool, losing 6–5 on aggregate, and completed the loan spell with 10 appearances. He left Reading at the end of 2016–17.

=== Barrow ===
On 1 July 2017, Moore signed for National League club Barrow on a one-year contract. He left the club by mutual consent on 22 January 2018, having made 18 appearances.

=== Swindon Town ===
Moore signed for League Two club Swindon Town on 27 January 2018 on a contract until the end of 2017–18. He was offered a new contract by Swindon at the end of the 2017–18 season.

=== Milton Keynes Dons ===
On 2 August 2018, Moore signed for newly relegated League Two club Milton Keynes Dons. Due to impressive performances, Moore temporarily became first choice goalkeeper for the club and made six league appearances during the successful 2018–19 promotion-winning season. After limited opportunities the following season, Moore was one of nine players released by Milton Keynes Dons.

=== Wealdstone ===
In December 2020, Moore signed for National League club Wealdstone. On 19 December 2020, Moore saved a 96th-minute penalty against Eastleigh to ensure a 4–3 victory and send Wealdstone to the 4th round of the FA Trophy. Moore left the club on 30 January 2021.

=== Blackpool ===
On 26 February 2021, Moore joined League One side Blackpool on a contract until the end of the season. He signed a one-year extension on 9 June 2021, with a clause for a possible additional twelve months. On 18 March 2023, Moore joined Doncaster Rovers on an emergency loan deal, making his debut the same day away at Salford City.

=== Morecambe ===
On 27 June 2023, Moore signed for recently relegated League Two club Morecambe on a one-year deal. On 17 May 2024, he signed a new one-year contract with the option for a further year.

On 30 July 2025, Moore joined League One side Wycombe Wanderers on a free transfer.

== Personal life ==
Moore is the brother of Sunderland A.F.C. goalkeeper Simon Moore. Their father and grandfather were also goalkeepers.

== Career statistics ==
As of end of 2023–24 season

Appearances and goals by club, season and competition
Club	Season	League			FA Cup		EFL Cup		Other		Total	
Club	Season	Division	Apps	Goals	Apps	Goals	Apps	Goals	Apps	Goals	Apps	Goals
Reading	2013–14	Championship	0	0	0	0	0	0	—		0	0
Reading	2014–15	Championship	0	0	—		0	0	—		0	0
Reading	2015–16	Championship	0	0	0	0	0	0	—		0	0
Reading	2016–17	Championship	0	0	0	0	0	0	—		0	0
Reading	Total		0	0	0	0	0	0	—		0	0
Bashley (loan)	2012–13	Southern League Premier Division	31	0	—		—		2 (Note: Appearances in FA Trophy)	0	33	0
Gloucester City (loan)	2013–14	Conference North	4	0	—		—		—		4	0
Bath City (loan)	2013–14	Conference South	3	0	—		—		1 (Note: Appearance in Somerset Premier Cup)	0	4	0
Basingstoke Town (loan)	2014–15	Conference South	37	0	6	0	—		5 (Note: Three appearances in FA Trophy, two in Conference South play-offs)	0	48	0
Peterborough United (loan)	2015–16	League One	4	0	—		—		—		4	0
Reading U23	2016–17	—			—		—		2 (Note: Appearances in EFL Trophy)	0	2	0
Luton Town (loan)	2016–17	League Two	8	0	—		—		2 (Note: Appearances in League Two play-offs)	0	10	0
Barrow	2017–18	National League	18	0	0	0	—		0	0	18	0
Swindon Town	2017–18	League Two	10	0	—		—		—		10	0
Milton Keynes Dons	2018–19	League Two	6	0	0	0	0	0	3	0	9	0
Milton Keynes Dons	2019–20	League One	0	0	0	0	2	0	4	0	6	0
Milton Keynes Dons	Total		6	0	0	0	2	0	7	0	15	0
Wealdstone	2020–21	National League	7	0	0	0	—		0	0	7	0
Blackpool	2020–21	League One	1	0	0	0	0	0	0	0	1	0
Blackpool	2021–22	Championship	1	0	0	0	0	0	0	0	1	0
Doncaster Rovers (loan)	2022–23	League Two	2	0	0	0	0	0	0	0	2	0
Morecambe	2023–24	League Two	12	0	0	0	1	0	0	0	13	0
Career total			144	0	6	0	3	0	19	0	172	0

== Honours ==
Reading U21

- U21 Premier League Cup: 2013–14

Blackpool

- EFL League One play-offs: 2021

Individual

- Basingstoke Town Player of the Year: 2014–15
