= Matt Partridge =

English footballer

Personal information
- Full name: Matthew Nicholas Partridge
- Date of birth: 7 November 1993 (age 33)
- Place of birth: Thatcham, England
- Height: 6 ft 3 in (1.91 m)
- Position: Defender

Team information
- Current team: Hungerford Town

Youth career
- –2012: Reading

Senior career*
Years	Team	Apps	(Gls)
2012–2014	Reading	0	(0)
2012	→ Bognor Regis Town (loan)		
2013	→ Basingstoke Town (loan)	7	(2)
2013–2014	→ Basingstoke Town (loan)	7	(1)
2014–2015	Dagenham & Redbridge	26	(1)
2015	Basingstoke Town	2	(0)
2015–2016	Newport County	20	(0)
2016–2017	Basingstoke Town	30	(5)
2017–2018	Hungerford Town	13	(0)
2018–2019	Salisbury	29	(5)
2019	Gosport Borough	1	(0)
2019–2020	Thatcham Town	18	(3)
2020–	Hungerford Town	16	(1)
- * Club domestic league appearances and goals as of 21:56, 11 February 2021 (UTC)

Matthew Nicholas Partridge (born 7 November 1993) is an English football defender who plays for National League South side Hungerford Town.

== Career ==
Partridge started his career in the youth system at Reading F.C. Progressing through the academy as under-18's captain, he went on to sign a professional one-year contract in July 2012. In October 2012, he joined the Isthmian League Premier Division side Bognor Regis Town on a one-month loan deal. In November, his loan was extended for a further month. Having returned to Reading F.C. after the Boxing Day fixture, he remained a regular for the under-21s during the 2012–13 campaign. In May 2013, he was offered a new one-year contract by Reading.

In September 2013, he joined Conference South side Basingstoke Town on a one-month loan deal. He scored on his debut in a 3–2 away defeat to Bromley, scoring the opening goal. His second goal for the club came in a 3–1 defeat to Weston-super-Mare in the FA Cup. In October, his loan at the club was extended for a further month. In November, he scored the second in a 2–0 victory over Dover Athletic in the league. At the end of the month, his loan expired, having made eight appearances and scoring three times. At the end of December, he re-joined Basingstoke on loan until the end of the season. His final goal for the club came in February 2014, in a 1–1 draw with Boreham Wood. He finished the season having made fifteen appearances, scoring four goals in all competitions.

In July 2014, having been released by Reading F.C., he signed for Football League Two side Dagenham & Redbridge on a one-year deal. He made his professional debut in August 2014, starting in the Football League Cup tie against Brentford. The match ended in a 6–6 draw, equaling the record for the most goals scored in a League Cup game, with Brentford eventually advancing on penalties.

In August 2015, after starting his second season with the club as a regular and just two months after signing a new deal, Partridge was released by Dagenham by mutual consent. Four days later, he re-joined National League South side Basingstoke Town, only to sign for League Two club Newport County shortly after. He made his debut for Newport on 5 September 2015. He was released by Newport on 10 May 2016 at the end of his contract. In the summer of 2017, he returned to Basingstoke Town for a third spell, making a total of thirty-eight appearances and scoring six goals upon his return. In July 2017, he signed for National League South side Hungerford Town on a free transfer.

On 22 May 2019, Partridge joined Gosport Borough.

== Personal life ==
He was raised in Thatcham, Berkshire and attended the Kennet School in the town. In April 2014, he was given a twelve-month prison sentence, suspended for two years, after being found guilty of assaulting a motorcyclist in Woolhampton in August 2013.

== Career statistics ==
As of match played 9 April 2018

Appearances and goals by club, season and competition
Club	Season	League			FA Cup		League Cup		Other		Total	
Club	Season	Division	Apps	Goals	Apps	Goals	Apps	Goals	Apps	Goals	Apps	Goals
Reading	2012–13	Premier League	0	0	0	0	0	0	—		0	0
Reading	2013–14	Championship	0	0	0	0	0	0	—		0	0
Reading	Total		0	0	0	0	0	0	—		0	0
Basingstoke Town (loan)	2013–14	Conference South	14	3	1	1	—		—		15	4
Dagenham & Redbridge	2014–15	League Two	24	1	2	0	1	0	1 (Note: Appearance in Football League Trophy)	0	28	1
Dagenham & Redbridge	2015–16	League Two	2	0	—		1	0	—		3	0
Dagenham & Redbridge	Total		26	1	2	0	2	0	1	0	31	1
Basingstoke Town	2015–16	National League South	2	0	—		—		—		2	0
Newport County	2015–16	League Two	20	0	3	0	—		0	0	23	0
Basingstoke Town	2016–17	SL Premier Division	30	5	1	1	—		3 (Note: Appearances in FA Trophy)	0	34	6
Hungerford Town	2017–18	National League South	13	0	1	0	—		0	0	14	0
Salisbury	2018–19	SL Premier Division South	29	5	3	1	—		3 (Note: Two appearances in FA Trophy, one in SL Premier Division South play-offs)	0	35	6
Gosport Borough	2019–20	SL Premier Division South	1	0	1	0	—		—		2	0
Thatcham Town	2019–20	SL Division One South	18	3	—		—		3	0	21	3
Career total			115	12	10	2	2	0	7	0	134	14
