= Aaron Kuhl =

English footballer (born 1996)

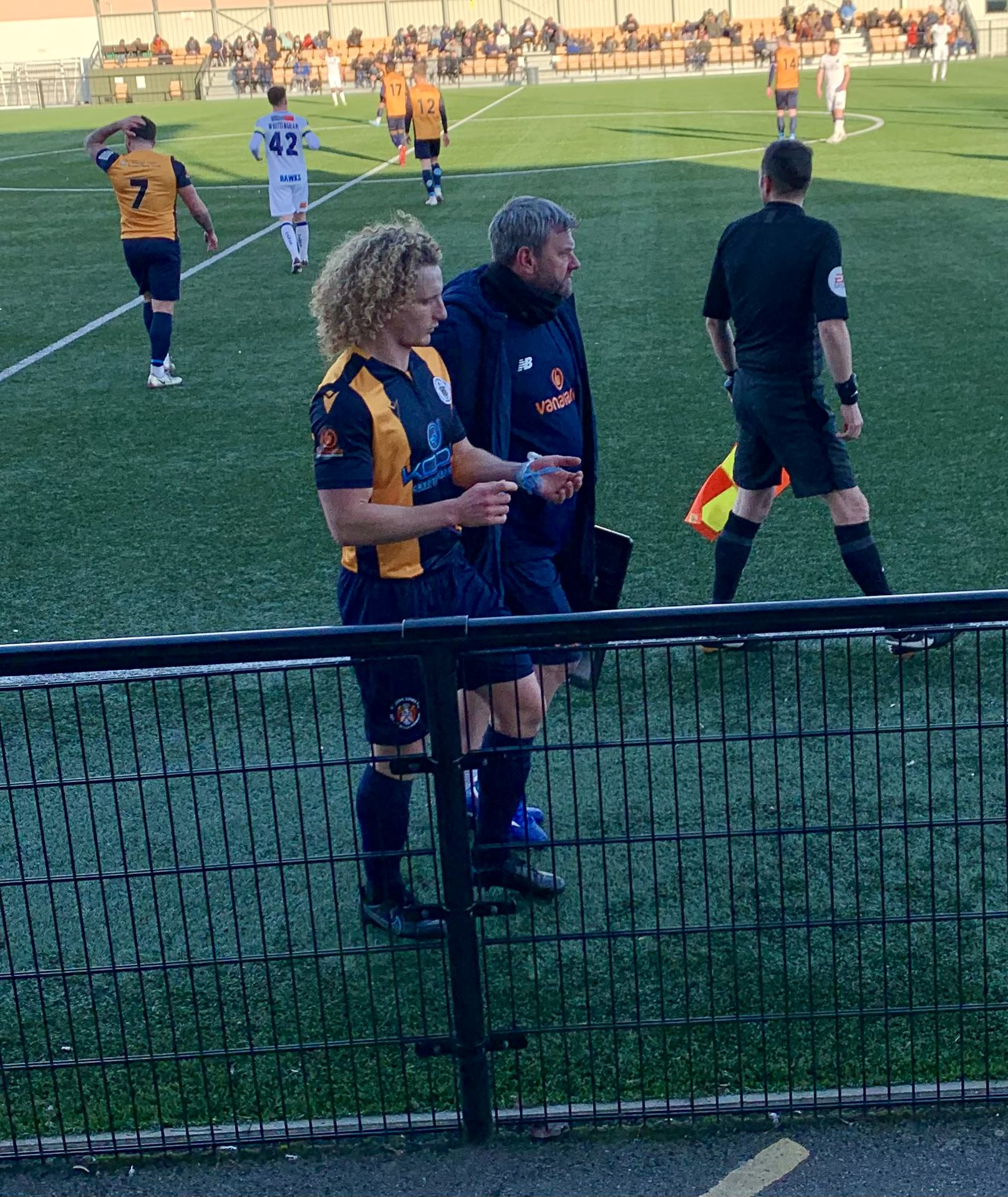

Personal information
- Full name: Aaron John Kuhl
- Date of birth: 30 January 1996 (age 30)
- Place of birth: Paulton, Somerset, England
- Height: 1.77 m (5 ft 10 in)
- Position: Midfielder

Team information
- Current team: Farnham Town
- Number: 20

Youth career
- 2008–2013: Reading

Senior career*
Years	Team	Apps	(Gls)
2013–2017	Reading	6	(0)
2015	→ Dundee United (loan)	5	(0)
2016	→ Boreham Wood (loan)	9	(0)
2019	Basingstoke Town	4	(0)
2019–2023	Slough Town	67	(7)
2019	→ Hartley Wintney (dual-reg.)	9	(1)
2023–2024	Dorking Wanderers	21	(0)
2023–2024	→ Farnborough (loan)	27	(8)
2024–2026	Farnborough	35	(1)
2026–	Farnham Town	0	(0)

International career^{‡}
2015	England U19	1	(0)
2015	England U20	1	(0)
- * Club domestic league appearances and goals as of 13:12, 20 April 2026 (UTC) ‡ National team caps and goals as of 15:38, 9 September 2015 (UTC)

Aaron Kuhl (born 30 January 1996) is an English semi-professional footballer who plays for National League South side Farnham Town as a midfielder. He was a member of the Reading academy and made his debut for the club before loan spells with Dundee United in Scotland during 2015, and with Boreham Wood in 2016. He has represented England at under-19 and under-20 level.

== Early life ==
Kuhl was born in Paulton. His father is the former professional footballer Martin Kuhl. He attended Yateley School in Hampshire.

== Club career ==
Kuhl joined Reading academy in 2008. In December 2013, he signed his first professional contract. After impressing for Under-21s in their run to winning 2013–14 Under-21 Premier League Cup, Kuhl gathered interested from the beaten finalist, Manchester City.

On 19 August 2014, Kuhl made his professional debut as a half-time substitute in a Championship fixture against Huddersfield Town.

During July 2015, Kuhl joined RCD Mallorca on trial with a view to a season-long loan deal with the Spanish Segunda División side.

On 1 September 2015, Kuhl joined Scottish Premiership club Dundee United on loan until January 2016. On 14 December 2015, Kuhl returned to Reading early from his loan deal with Dundee United.

On 9 May 2016, Kuhl was one of 15 Reading youth-team players offered a new contract by the club, with confirmation of his new deal being signed coming on 1 July 2016.

On 19 August 2016, Kuhl signed for National League club Boreham Wood on loan until 28 January 2017, but the deal ended early as Kuhl was recalled at the beginning of January.

After Reading announced that Kuhl would be leaving the club upon the completion of his contract, Kuhl joined Icelandic club Stjarnan on trial at the end of June, before similar stints with Bracknell Town and Aldershot Town. Whilst on trial with Aldershot Town, Kuhl injured his left knee, rupturing his Medial collateral ligament in a friendly against Wycombe Wanderers.

In October 2019, Basingstoke Town announced the signing of Kuhl on a short-term contract following a successful trial after a long injury lay-off.

On 15 November 2019, National League South side Slough Town announced the signing of Kuhl. He joined Hartley Wintney on loan in December 2019.

On 30 January 2023, Kuhl signed for National League club Dorking Wanderers. On 20 October 2023, Kuhl joined National League South side, Farnborough until January 2024. On 24 March 2024, he was recalled by Dorking in an attempt to aid the club in their relegation battle.

On 18 October 2024, Kuhl made the return to Farnborough following his release from Dorking Wanderers earlier that month.

On 12 May 2026, it was announced that Kuhl would join newly-promoted National League South side, Farnham Town on a one-year deal.

== International career ==
On 17 March 2015, Kuhl was called up to the England under-19 squad for the first time, making his debut in their 1–0 victory over Azerbaijan on 28 March.

Kuhl received his first England under-20 call up in August 2015, for the team's friendly matches against the Czech Republic on 5 and 7 September 2015, making his debut in their 5–0 victory on 5 September.

== Career statistics ==
As of match played 18 April 2026

Appearances and goals by club, season and competition
Club	Season	League			National Cup		League Cup		Other		Total	
Club	Season	Division	Apps	Goals	Apps	Goals	Apps	Goals	Apps	Goals	Apps	Goals
Reading	2014–15	Championship	6	0	0	0	2	0	—		8	0
Reading	2015–16	Championship	0	0	0	0	0	0	—		0	0
Reading	2016–17	Championship	0	0	0	0	0	0	—		0	0
Reading	Total		6	0	0	0	2	0	—		8	0
Dundee United (loan)	2015–16	Scottish Premiership	5	0	0	0	2	0	—		7	0
Boreham Wood (loan)	2016–17	National League	9	0	1	0	—		0	0	10	0
Basingstoke Town	2019–20	Southern League Division One South	4	0	—		—		2 (Note: Appearances in the FA Trophy)	0	6	0
Slough Town	2019–20	National League South	1	0	—		—		1 (Note: Appearance in the National League South play-offs)	0	2	0
Slough Town	2020–21	National League South	11	0	2	0	—		1	0	14	0
Slough Town	2021–22	National League South	34	6	1	0	—		3	1	38	7
Slough Town	2022–23	National League South	21	1	1	0	—		1	0	23	1
Slough Town	Total		67	7	4	0	—		6	1	77	8
Hartley Wintney (dual-reg.)	2019–20	Southern League Premier Division South	9	1	—		—		—		9	1
Dorking Wanderers	2022–23	National League	8	0	—		—		—		8	0
Dorking Wanderers	2023–24	National League	11	0	1	0	—		0	0	12	0
Dorking Wanderers	2024–25	National League South	2	0	0	0	—		0	0	2	0
Dorking Wanderers	Total		21	0	1	0	—		0	0	22	0
Farnborough (loan)	2023–24	National League South	27	8	—		—		1	1	28	9
Farnborough	2024–25	National League South	31	1	—		—		1	0	32	1
Farnborough	2025–26	National League South	4	0	0	0	—		0	0	4	0
Farnborough	Total		35	1	0	0	—		1	0	36	1
Farnham Town	2026–27	National League South	0	0	0	0	—		0	0	0	0
Career total			181	17	6	0	4	0	10	2	201	19

== Honours ==
=== Club ===
Reading

- U21 Premier League Cup (1): 2013–14
