= 2013–14 Under-21 Premier League Cup =

2013–14 Barclays Under-21 Premier League Cup
Tournament details
- Country: England; Wales
- Teams: 52

Final positions
- Champions: Reading (1st Title)
- Runners-up: Manchester City (1st Runner Up Finish)

Tournament statistics
- Matches played: 52
- Goals scored: 179 (3.44 per match)
- Top goal scorer: (England) Craig Tanner Reading (9 Goals)

The 2013-14 Under-21 Premier League Cup (known as the Barclays Under-21 Premier League Cup for sponsorship reasons) was the first edition of the U21 Premier League Cup.

Fifty two teams entered the competition – with sixteen Category 3 EPPP teams entered in the 1st Qualifying Round, seventeen Category 2 teams entered in the 2nd Qualifying Round, and the remaining nineteen Category 1 teams entered in the Round of 32. Teams were allowed to field up to four over-age players in matches – three outfield and one goalkeeper.

== Participants ==
=== Category 1 ===
North	South
Blackburn Rovers	Arsenal
Bolton Wanderers	Aston Villa
Everton	Chelsea
Leicester City	Fulham
Manchester City	Norwich City
Middlesbrough	Reading
Newcastle United	Southampton
Stoke City	West Ham United
Sunderland	
West Bromwich Albion	
Wolverhampton Wanderers	

=== Category 2 ===
North	South
Barnsley	Brighton & Hove Albion
Birmingham City	Bristol City
Coventry City	Cardiff City
Crewe Alexandra	Crystal Palace
Derby County	Millwall
Huddersfield Town	Queens Park Rangers
Leeds United	Swansea City
Nottingham Forest	
Sheffield United	
Sheffield Wednesday	

=== Category 3 ===
North	South
Burnley	AFC Wimbledon
Doncaster Rovers	Bournemouth
Hull City	Bristol Rovers
Notts County	Colchester United
Preston North End	Exeter City
Wigan Athletic	Gillingham
	Peterborough United
	Plymouth Argyle
	Torquay United
	Watford

== Matches ==
=== First qualifying round ===
This round commences the week beginning 23 September 2013. Only the sixteen Category 3 rated academies competed in this round.

==== Northern Section ====
Date	Home team	Score	Away team	Attendance
8 Oct	Burnley	0–0	Wigan Athletic	581
Burnley advance 7 – 6 on penalties.
23 Sep	Preston North End	0–2	Hull City	216
24 Sep	Doncaster Rovers	0–3	Notts County	

==== Southern Section ====
Date	Home team	Score	Away team	Attendance
24 Sep	AFC Bournemouth	1–2	Plymouth Argyle	146
26 Sep	Peterborough United	3–2	Colchester United	
1 Oct	AFC Wimbledon	2–0	Gillingham	
3 Oct	Watford	1–1	Bristol Rovers	230
Watford advance 4 – 3 on penalties.
30 Sep	Exeter City	4–1	Torquay United	470

=== Second qualifying round ===
This round commenced the week beginning 21 October 2013. The eight First Qualifying Round winners were joined in this round by sixteen of the seventeen Category 2 rated academies – Nottingham Forest drew a bye to the Round of 32.

==== Northern Section ====
Date	Home team	Score	Away team	Attendance
30 Oct	Crewe Alexandra	1–2	Burnley	
23 Oct	Derby County	1–2	Hull City	
23 Oct	Coventry City	1–2	Notts County	
28 Oct	Sheffield United	2–3	Birmingham City	
29 Oct	Barnsley	4–3†	Leeds United	
30 Oct	Huddersfield Town	1–2	Sheffield Wednesday	

==== Southern Section ====
Date	Home team	Score	Away team	Attendance
5 Nov	Queens Park Rangers	4–3	AFC Wimbledon	
30 Oct	Plymouth Argyle	0–2	Watford	332
29 Oct	Swansea City	1–1	Millwall	
Swansea City advance 4 – 2 on penalties.
29 Oct	Crystal Palace	2–3	Exeter City	273
29 Oct	Brighton & Hove Albion	3–4†	Cardiff City	
14 Nov	Bristol City	1–0†	Peterborough United	

† – After extra time

=== Round of 32 ===
This round begins the week beginning 18 November 2013. The nineteen Category 1 sides were joined in this round by the twelve Second Qualifying round winners and Nottingham Forest, who drew a bye to this round. Birmingham City withdrew from the competition after fielding an ineligible player. Newcastle United progressed to the Round of 16 instead.

==== Northern Section ====
Date	Home team	Score	Away team	Attendance
18 Nov	Middlesbrough	2–3	Everton	327
20 Nov	Notts County	1–2	Wolverhampton Wanderers	141
19 Nov	Blackburn Rovers	3–1	Hull City	136
21 Nov	Stoke City	0–2†	Manchester City	
19 Nov	Bolton Wanderers	4–2	Barnsley	
18 Nov	West Bromwich Albion	2–1†	Nottingham Forest	190
26 Nov	Burnley	2–1	Sunderland	347
19 Nov	Leicester City	4–1	Sheffield Wednesday	
26 Nov	Birmingham City	1–2	Newcastle United	

==== Southern Section ====
Date	Home team	Score	Away team	Attendance
26 Nov	Aston Villa	0–3	Fulham	190
26 Nov	Reading	3–1	Queens Park Rangers	
6 Dec	Cardiff City	0–4	Chelsea	882
20 Nov	Exeter City	2–0	Southampton	447
26 Nov	Swansea City	0–0	Watford	
Watford advance 4 – 3 on penalties.
2 Dec	Bristol City	1–2	West Ham United	
19 Nov	Norwich City	0–1	Arsenal	

† – After extra time.

=== Round of 16 ===
This round commenced the week beginning 16 December 2013. The sixteen Round of 32 winners entered this round.

Date	Home team	Score	Away team	Attendance
6 Jan	Chelsea	2–1	West Ham United	
7 Jan	Exeter City	2–1	Blackburn Rovers	630
30 Dec	Newcastle United	2–1	Leicester City	385
20 Dec	Everton	2–3	Wolverhampton Wanderers	

Date	Home team	Score	Away team	Attendance
31 Jan	Reading	6–1	Watford	BCD
23 Dec	Burnley	3–0	Bolton Wanderers	251
9 Jan	Fulham	0–1	Arsenal	351
22 Dec	Manchester City	2–0	West Bromwich Albion	

=== Quarter-finals ===
This round commenced the week beginning 27 January 2014. The eight Round of 16 winners entered this round.

Date	Home team	Score	Away team	Attendance
27 Jan	Chelsea	0–1†	Arsenal	1,237
20 Feb	Wolverhampton Wanderers	1–3	Reading	133

Date	Home team	Score	Away team	Attendance
21 Feb	Newcastle United	2–3	Manchester City	BCD
4 Mar	Exeter City	2–3†	Burnley	1,207

† – After extra time.

=== Semi-finals ===
This round commenced the week beginning 24 February 2014. The four Quarter-final winners entered this round.

Date	Home team	Score	Away team	Attendance
15 Mar	Arsenal	1–3†	Reading	

Date	Home team	Score	Away team	Attendance
1 Apr	Manchester City	3–2	Burnley	424

=== Final ===
==== First leg ====
10 April 2014
19:00 BST

Manchester City	3–2	Reading
Devante Cole 39', 90'; Marcos Lopes 65' (pen.)	Report	Gozie Ugwu 13'; Craig Tanner 31'

City of Manchester Stadium
Attendance: 4,873
Referee: Lee Mason

Manchester City	Reading

Note: Flags indicate national team as defined under FIFA eligibility rules; some limited exceptions apply. Players may hold more than one non-FIFA nationality.

Manchester City
No.	Pos.	Nation	Player
1	GK	IRL	Ian Lawlor
2	DF	ENG	Adam Drury
3	DF	JAM	Greg Leigh (substituted off) 70'
4	DF	ENG	Shay Facey
5	DF	BEL	Jason Denayer
6	MF	ENG	George Glendon (substituted off) 54'
7	MF	AUT	Sinan Bytyqi
8	MF	CMR	Olivier Ntcham
9	FW	ENG	Jordy Hiwula
10	FW	POR	Marcos Lopes
11	FW	JAM	Devante Cole
Sub	DF	ENG	Ellis Plummer
Sub	GK	WAL	Billy O'Brien
Sub	DF	BEL	Mathias Bossaerts
Sub	DF	ESP	Angeliño (substituted on) 70'
Sub	MF	CIV	Seko Fofana (substituted on) 54'

Reading
No.	Pos.	Nation	Player
1	GK	ENG	Daniel Lincoln
2	DF	IRL	Niall Keown
3	DF	IRL	Shane Griffin
4	MF	COD	Aaron Tshibola
5	DF	ENG	Jake Cooper (red card) 64'
6	DF	IRL	Pierce Sweeney
7	MF	ENG	Jack Stacey
8	MF	ENG	Aaron Kuhl
9	FW	ENG	Gozie Ugwu
10	FW	ENG	Craig Tanner
11	MF	GHA	Tarique Fosu-Henry
Sub	DF	IRL	Sean Long
Sub	GK	ENG	Lewis Ward
Sub	MF	ZIM	Shepherd Murombedzi
Sub	MF	IRL	Liam Kelly
Sub	FW	SCO	Harry Cardwell

==== Second leg ====
19 April 2014
15:00 BST

Reading	2–0	Manchester City
Fosu 72'; Jack Stacey 74'	Report

Madjeski Stadium
Attendance: 3,034
Referee: Kevin Friend

Reading	Manchester City

Note: Flags indicate national team as defined under FIFA eligibility rules; some limited exceptions apply. Players may hold more than one non-FIFA nationality.

Reading
No.	Pos.	Nation	Player
1	GK	ENG	Daniel Lincoln
2	DF	IRL	Sean Long (substituted off) 68'
3	DF	IRL	Shane Griffin
4	DF	IRL	Niall Keown
5	DF	ENG	Jake Cooper
6	DF	IRL	Pierce Sweeney
7	MF	COD	Aaron Tshibola
8	MF	ENG	Jack Stacey
9	MF	IRL	Liam Kelly
10	FW	ENG	Craig Tanner
11	FW	ENG	Gozie Ugwu
Sub	GK	ENG	Lewis Ward
Sub	MF	ZIM	Shepherd Murombedzi
Sub	MF	ISL	Samúel Friðjónsson
Sub	FW	SCO	Harry Cardwell
Sub	MF	GHA	Tarique Fosu (substituted on) 68'

Manchester City
No.	Pos.	Nation	Player
1	GK	IRL	Ian Lawlor
2	DF	ENG	Adam Drury (substituted off) 75'
3	DF	ENG	Shay Facey
4	DF	BEL	Jason Denayer
5	DF	JAM	Greg Leigh
6	MF	ENG	George Glendon
7	MF	CIV	Seko Fofana
8	MF	CMR	Olivier Ntcham
9	FW	POR	Marcos Lopes
10	FW	JAM	Devante Cole
11	FW	ENG	Jordy Hiwula
Sub	MF	AUT	Sinan Bytyqi (substituted on) 75'
Sub	DF	ENG	Ellis Plummer
Sub	GK	WAL	Billy O'Brien
Sub	MF	ENG	Kean Bryan
Sub			
