= Pierce Sweeney =

Irish footballer

Personal information
- Full name: Pierce Liam Sweeney
- Date of birth: 11 September 1994 (age 32)
- Place of birth: Dublin, Ireland
- Height: 6 ft 0 in (1.83 m)
- Position: Defender

Team information
- Current team: Cheltenham Town
- Number: 25

Youth career
- 2006–2012: Belvedere
- 2012: Bray Wanderers

Senior career*
Years	Team	Apps	(Gls)
2012	Bray Wanderers	12	(0)
2012–2016	Reading	0	(0)
2016–2021	Exeter City	186	(17)
2021	Swindon Town	0	(0)
2021–2026	Exeter City	186	(4)
2026–	Cheltenham Town	15	(0)

International career^{‡}
2010–2011	Republic of Ireland U17	2	(0)
2011–2013	Republic of Ireland U19	6	(0)
2013	Republic of Ireland U21	1	(0)
- * Club domestic league appearances and goals as of 20:49, 22 November 2026 (UTC) ‡ National team caps and goals as of 18:00, 1 August 2016 (UTC)

Pierce Liam Sweeney (born 11 September 1994) is an Irish professional footballer who plays as a defender for EFL League Two club Cheltenham Town.

== Career ==
=== Schoolboy football ===
Sweeney began his career at Ardmore Rovers in his hometown of Bray, before moving on to the under-13 level with Belvedere.

=== Bray Wanderers ===
In 2012, Sweeney joined League of Ireland Premier Division side Bray Wanderers. He made 12 appearances for the Seagulls during the 2012 season.

=== Reading ===
On 6 July 2012, Sweeney signed with then-Premier League side Reading. Although he was a member of Reading's Under 21 2013-14 Premier League Cup-winning side, on 9 May 2016, Sweeney was released by Reading without having made a first-team appearance for the club.

=== Exeter City ===
On 22 July 2016, Sweeney signed with Exeter City as the 1931 Fund fan-funded player after a successful trial. He scored two goals and an assist in Exeter's 5–1 defeat of Notts County on 8 September 2018, and had already scored two additional goals before the end of September 2018.

=== Swindon Town ===
On 11 June 2021, Sweeney signed a two-year deal with Swindon Town to begin on 1 July 2021, after rejecting an offer from Exeter City. His contract was terminated by mutual consent on 2 July 2021, with Sweeney stating that 'due to family circumstances at this current moment I am unable to fulfil relocating to be part of the team'.

=== Exeter City return ===
Following his abrupt departure from Swindon Town, Sweeney returned to Exeter City on 8 July 2021. He was vice-captain as Exeter City secured a return to League One for the first time since 2012. In June 2022, Sweeney signed a new two-year deal with the club.

On 14 January 2023, in his first match as club captain following the departure of Matt Jay, Sweeney made his 300th appearance for Exeter City in all competitions. At the end of the 2022–23 season, Sweeney was chosen as Exeter's Player of the Year.

=== Cheltenham Town ===
On 29 June 2026, Sweeney signed for Cheltenham Town.

== International career ==
Sweeney has represented the Republic of Ireland at under-U17, under-U19, and under-U21 levels.

== Career statistics ==
As of match played 21 November 2026

Appearances and goals by club, season and competition
Club	Season	Division	League		National Cup		League Cup		Other		Total	
Club	Season	Division	Apps	Goals	Apps	Goals	Apps	Goals	Apps	Goals	Apps	Goals
Bray Wanderers	2012	LOI Premier Division	12	0	0	0	0	0	2 (Note: Appearances in Setanta Sports Cup)	0	14	0
Reading	2012–13	Premier League	0	0	0	0	0	0	—		0	0
Reading	2013–14	Championship	0	0	0	0	0	0	—		0	0
Reading	2014–15	Championship	0	0	0	0	0	0	—		0	0
Reading	2015–16	Championship	0	0	0	0	0	0	—		0	0
Reading	Total		0	0	0	0	0	0	—		0	0
Exeter City	2016–17	League Two	29	0	1	0	2	0	5 (Note: Three appearances in EFL Trophy, two appearances in EFL League Two play-offs)	0	37	0
Exeter City	2017–18	League Two	40	8	4	1	1	0	4 (Note: One appearance in EFL Trophy, three appearances in EFL League Two play-offs)	0	49	9
Exeter City	2018–19	League Two	43	4	1	0	1	0	1 (Note: Appearance(s) in EFL Trophy)	0	46	4
Exeter City	2019–20	League Two	36	2	4	0	1	1	6 (Note: Three appearances in EFL Trophy, three appearances in EFL League Two play-offs)	0	47	3
Exeter City	2020–21	League Two	38	3	2	0	0	0	2	0	42	3
Exeter City	2021–22	League Two	43	0	2	0	1	0	3	0	49	0
Exeter City	2022–23	League One	43	2	2	0	2	0	2	0	49	2
Exeter City	2023–24	League One	42	0	1	0	3	0	2	0	48	0
Exeter City	2024–25	League One	18	0	2	0	1	0	2	1	23	1
Exeter City	2025–26	League One	40	2	2	0	1	0	2	0	45	2
Exeter City	Total		372	21	21	1	13	1	29	1	435	24
Cheltenham Town	2026–27	League Two	15	0	1	0	1	0	1	0	18	0
Career total			399	21	22	1	14	1	32	1	467	24

== Honours ==
Reading

- Premier League Cup: 2013–14

Exeter City

- EFL League Two runner-up: 2021–22

Individual

- FAI Under-19 Irish International Player of the Year: 2013
- Exeter City Player of the Year: 2022–23
