= Dan Lincoln (cricketer) =

English cricketer

Personal information
- Full name: Daniel John Lincoln
- Born: 26 May 1995 (age 31); Frimley, Surrey, England
- Batting: Right-handed
- Bowling: Right-arm medium
- Role: Batsman, wicket-keeper

Domestic team information
- Years: Team
- 2012-2025: Berkshire (squad no. 25)
- 2019–2020: Middlesex (squad no. 43)
- 2021: Kent (squad no. 25)
- T20 debut: 25 July 2019 Middlesex v Gloucestershire
- Only FC: 11 July 2021 Kent v Sussex

Career statistics
Competition	First-class	Twenty20
Matches	1	11
Runs scored	41	123
Batting average	20.50	13.66
100s/50s	0/0	0/0
Top score	41	30
Catches/stumpings	1/–	7/0
- Source: CricInfo, 25 July 2021
Association football career
- Position: Goalkeeper
Team information
- Current team: Bognor Regis Town
Youth career
- 2005–2011: Reading
Senior career*
Years	Team	Apps	(Gls)
2011–2015	Reading	0	(0)
2013	→ Metropolitan Police (loan)	6	(0)
2013	→ Harrow Borough (loan)	4	(0)
2014	→ Farnborough (loan)	6	(0)
2015	→ Nuneaton Town (loan)	2	(0)
2015–2016	Hayes & Yeading United	25	(0)
2016	Basingstoke Town	9	(0)
2016–2019	Bognor Regis Town	121	(0)
2016	→ Braintree Town (loan)	1	(0)
2019–2020	Hampton & Richmond Borough	24	(0)
2021–2023	Dorking Wanderers	62	(0)
2023–2024	Slough Town	32	(0)
2024–2025	Salisbury	17	(0)
2025	Truro City	0	(0)
2025–	Bognor Regis Town	31	(0)
- * Club domestic league appearances and goals as of 20:31, 21 October 2025 (UTC)

Daniel John Lincoln (born 26 May 1995) is an English cricketer and footballer who plays as a goalkeeper for Bognor Regis Town.

== Early life ==
Lincoln was born at Frimley in Surrey and attended Edgbarrow School at Crowthorne in Berkshire.

== Cricket career ==
He first played Minor Counties cricket for Berkshire County Cricket Club in 2012 and has continued to play for the team when available. After playing Second XI cricket in 2018 and 2018, in July 2019, Lincoln was registered by Middlesex County Cricket Club to play in the 2019 t20 Blast. He made his debut on 25 July 2019 against Gloucestershire, scoring 30 from 24 balls batting at number three. In November 2020, Middlesex announced they had released Lincoln. As well as Middlesex, Lincoln has played Second XI cricket for Gloucestershire, Kent, Northants and Warwickshire.

Lincoln made his first-class cricket debut on 11 July 2021, for Kent in the 2021 County Championship. Following a positive COVID-19 case in Kent's first XI, he was part of a team that was brought together for the county's fixture against Sussex. A member of the county's First XI squad had tested positive for COVID-19, which required the players involved in the county's previous match to all self-isolate. As a result, a number of Second XI players or "homegrown prospects" were drafted into the squad and made their senior debuts for the county. Lincoln made two appearances in the Vitality Blast against his former team Middlesex at Lords and Sussex back at Canterbury. Lincoln stayed with the squad for the remainder of the 2021 campaign where Kent went on to win the Vitality Blast, for the second time in their history.

== Football career ==
Prior to playing for Middlesex, he played football as a goalkeeper in the Reading academy. He subsequently played non-league football for a number of clubs. In May 2021, Lincoln signed a one-year contract to play football for Harrow Borough. He had initially signed for the club in the curtailed 2020–21 season, but did not make a competitive appearance in that campaign. Following a spell back with Farnborough in November 2021, Lincoln joined National League South team Dorking Wanderers the following month. On 12 April 2023, it was announced that he would leave the club at the end of the 2022–23 campaign. Lincoln would leave the club with 62 appearances in all competitions to his name. On 17 November 2023, Lincoln agreed to join National League South team, Slough Town.

== Football statistics ==
As of match played 29 April 2023

Appearances and goals by club, season and competition
Club	Season	League			FA Cup		EFL Cup		Other		Total	
Club	Season	Division	Apps	Goals	Apps	Goals	Apps	Goals	Apps	Goals	Apps	Goals
Reading	2013–14	Championship	0	0	0	0	0	0	—		0	0
Reading	2014–15	Championship	0	0	0	0	0	0	—		0	0
Reading	Total		0	0	0	0	0	0	—		0	0
Metropolitan Police (loan)	2013–14	Isthmian League Premier Division	4	0	0	0	—		0	0	4	0
Harrow Borough (loan)	2013–14	Isthmian League Premier Division	2	0	—		—		1 (Note: Appearances in the FA Trophy)	0	3	0
Farnborough (loan)	2013–14	Conference South	3	0	—		—		—		3	0
Nuneaton Town (loan)	2014–15	Conference Premier	2	0	—		—		—		2	0
Hungerford Town	2015–16	Southern League Premier Division	2	0	0	0	—		0	0	2	0
Hayes & Yeading United	2015–16	National League South	20	0	1	0	—		2	0	23	0
Basingstoke Town	2015–16	National League South	9	0	—		—		—		9	0
Bognor Regis Town	2016–17	Isthmian League Premier Division	35	0	—		—		3 (Note: One appearance in the FA Trophy, two in the Isthmian League Premier Division play-offs)	0	38	0
Bognor Regis Town	2017–18	National League South	42	0	3	0	—		4	0	49	0
Bognor Regis Town	2018–19	Isthmian League Premier Division	39	0	3	0	—		4 (Note: One appearance in the Alan Turvey Trophy, three in the FA Trophy)	0	46	0
Bognor Regis Town	Total		116	0	6	0	—		11	0	133	0
Braintree Town (loan)	2016–17	National League	1	0	—		—		—		1	0
Hampton & Richmond Borough	2019–20	National League South	14	0	2	0	—		4	0	20	0
Harrow Borough	2020–21	Southern League Premier Division South	0	0	—		—		—		0	0
Harrow Borough	2021–22	Southern League Premier Division South	0	0	0	0	—		0	0	0	0
Harrow Borough	Total		0	0	0	0	—		0	0	0	0
Farnborough	2021–22	Southern League Premier Division South	1	0	—		—		0	0	1	0
Dorking Wanderers	2021–22	National League South	23	0	—		—		3 (Note: One appearance in the FA Trophy, two in the National League South play-offs)	0	26	0
Dorking Wanderers	2022–23	National League	33	0	0	0	—		3	0	36	0
Dorking Wanderers	Total		56	0	0	0	—		6	0	62	0
Slough Town	2023–24	National League South	0	0	—		—		0	0	0	0
Career total			230	0	9	0	0	0	24	0	263	0
