= 2020–21 Central Coast Mariners FC season =

Central Coast Mariners
2020–21 season
- Chairman: Michael Charlesworth
- Manager: Alen Stajcic
- Stadium: Central Coast Stadium, Gosford
- A-League: 3rd
- A-League Finals: Elimination-finals
- Top goalscorer: League: Matt Simon (10); All: Matt Simon (10)
- Highest home attendance: 10,173 (24 April 2021 vs. Sydney FC
- Lowest home attendance: 3,073 (3 February 2021 vs. Melbourne City
- Average home league attendance: 5,245

The 2020–21 Central Coast Mariners FC season is the club's 16th season since its establishment in 2004. The club will participate in the A-League for the 16th time. The club will not compete in the 2020 FFA Cup due to the event being cancelled following the COVID-19 pandemic in Australia.

== Players ==
Note: Flags indicate national team as defined under FIFA eligibility rules; some limited exceptions apply. Players may hold more than one non-FIFA nationality.

No.	Pos.	Nation	Player
1	GK	AUS	Mark Birighitti
3	DF	AUS	Lewis Miller
4	MF	AUS	Josh Nisbet
5	DF	AUS	Stefan Nigro
6	MF	NZL	Gianni Stensness
7	MF	SRB	Stefan Janković
8	MF	AUS	Oliver Bozanic (captain)
10	MF	AUS	Daniel De Silva
11	DF	AUS	Jack Clisby
12	FW	CRC	Marco Ureña

No.	Pos.	Nation	Player
14	MF	AUS	Daniel Bouman
15	DF	AUS	Kye Rowles
19	FW	AUS	Matt Simon
20	GK	AUS	Adam Pearce
21	DF	AUS	Ruon Tongyik
22	MF	POL	Michał Janota
23	DF	AUS	Dan Hall
25	DF	AUS	Matt Hatch (scholarship)
26	MF	AUS	Jaden Casella (scholarship)
29	FW	AUS	Alou Kuol (scholarship)

== Transfers ==
=== Transfers in ===
No.	Position	Player	Transferred from	Type/fee	Contract length	Date	Ref
8	MF	Oliver Bozanic	Unattached	Free transfer	2 years	21 October 2020	
14	MF	Daniel Bouman	Unattached	Free transfer	1 year	30 October 2020	
5	DF	Stefan Nigro	Unattached	Free transfer	1 year	9 December 2020	
22	MF	(Poland) Michał Janota	Unattached	Free transfer	1 year	17 December 2020	
26	MF	Jaden Casella	(Australia) Rockdale City Suns	Scholarship	1 year	18 December 2020	
7	MF	(Serbia) Stefan Janković	(Serbia) OFK Beograd	Undisclosed		18 December 2020	
12	FW	(Costa Rica) Marco Ureña	Unattached	Free transfer	1 year	22 December 2020	

==== From academy squad ====
N	Pos.	Nat.	Name	Age	Notes
25	DF	(Australia)	Matt Hatch	20	scholarship contract
23	DF	(Australia)	Dan Hall	21	1-year senior contract

=== Transfers out ===
No.	Position	Player	Transferred to	Type/fee	Date	Ref
10	FW	Tommy Oar	Macarthur FC	End of contract	15 January 2020	
7	MF	(Serbia) Milan Đurić	Unattached	End of contract	1 September 2020	
29	FW	(Brazil) Jair	Unattached	End of contract	1 September 2020	
8	MF	(New Zealand) Michael McGlinchey	Unattached	End of contract	1 September 2020	
22	MF	Jacob Melling	Unattached	End of contract	1 September 2020	
17	MF	Samuel Silvera	(Portugal) Paços de Ferreira	Undisclosed	4 September 2020	
30	FW	Dylan Ruiz-Diaz	Unattached	End of contract	1 October 2020	
16	DF	Dylan Fox	(India) NorthEast United	End of contract	2 October 2020	
24	MF	Chris Harold	Retired		9 October 2020	
9	FW	Jordan Murray	(India) Kerala Blasters	Undisclosed	19 October 2020	
2	DF	(Scotland) Ziggy Gordon	Western Sydney Wanderers	Mutual contract termination	17 December 2020	
25	FW	John Roberts	(Australia) Mt Druitt Town Rangers	End of contract	22 December 2020	

=== Contracts extensions ===
No.	Name	Position	Duration	Date	Notes
1	Mark Birighitti	Goalkeeper	1 year	6 October 2020	with option for a second year
19	Matt Simon	Striker	1 year	12 November 2020	
2	(Scotland) Ziggy Gordon	Full-back	1 year	13 November 2020	
15	Kye Rowles	Defender	2 years	16 June 2021	
1	Mark Birighitti	Goalkeeper	2 years	23 June 2021	
19	Matt Simon	Forward	1 year	24 June 2021	
23	Dan Hall	Defender	2 years	25 June 2021	
12	(Costa Rica) Marco Ureña	Striker	2 years	30 June 2021	

== Pre-season and friendlies ==
31 October 2020	Central Coast Mariners (Australia)	4–2	(Australia) Edgeworth FC	Tuggerah, Australia
		Report		Stadium: Central Coast Mariners Centre of Excellence; Attendance: 0 (behind closed doors)

13 November 2020	Newcastle Jets (Australia)	0–2	(Australia) Central Coast Mariners	Australia
		Report		Attendance: 0 (behind closed doors)

27 November 2020	Western Sydney Wanderers (Australia)	2–3 (a.e.t.)	(Australia) Central Coast Mariners	Blacktown, Australia
	Müller 58'; Triantis 73'	Report	Bonada 38'; Stensness 54'; McCarthy 110'	Stadium: Wanderers Centre of Excellence; Attendance: 0 (behind closed doors)

6 December 2020	Central Coast Mariners (Australia)	0–2	(New Zealand) Wellington Phoenix	Sydney, Australia
		Report	Waine 1'; Piscopo 37'	Attendance: 0 (behind closed doors)

11 December 2020	Central Coast Mariners (Australia)	3–1	(Australia) APIA Leichhardt	Sydney, Australia
	Simon 24'; Nisbet 68'; Kuol 88'	Report	Powell 10'	Stadium: Valentine Sports Park

20 December 2020	Central Coast Mariners (Australia)	Cancelled	Australia U-20	Gosford, Australia
		Cancellation		Stadium: Central Coast Stadium

20 December 2020	Central Coast Mariners (Australia)	Cancelled	(Australia) Marconi Stallions	Gosford, Australia
		Cancellation		Stadium: Central Coast Stadium

== Competitions ==
Win Draw Loss

=== Overview ===
Competition	First match	Last match	Starting round	Final position	Record							
Competition	First match	Last match	Starting round	Final position	Pld	W	D	L	GF	GA	GD	Win %
A-League	31 December 2020	5 June 2021	Matchday 1	3rd	26	12	6	8	35	31	+4	46.15
A-League Finals	12 June 2021		Elimination-finals	Elimination-finals	1	0	0	1	0	2	−2	0.00
Total					27	12	6	9	35	33	+2	44.44

Source: Soccerway

=== A-League ===
==== League table ====
Pos	Team	Pld	W	D	L	GF	GA	GD	Pts	Qualification
1	Melbourne City (C)	26	15	4	7	57	32	+25	49	Qualification for 2022 AFC Champions League group stage and finals series (Note: The top two teams entered the finals series at the semi-finals, while the teams ranked third to sixth entered the finals series at the elimination-finals.)
2	Sydney FC	26	13	8	5	39	23	+16	47	Qualification for 2022 AFC Champions League qualifying play-offs and finals series
3	Central Coast Mariners	26	12	6	8	35	31	+4	42	Qualification for finals series
4	Brisbane Roar	26	11	7	8	36	28	+8	40	Qualification for finals series
5	Adelaide United	26	11	6	9	39	41	−2	39	Qualification for finals series

Source: A-Leagues
Rules for classification: 1) Points; 2) Goal difference; 3) Goals scored; 4) Least red cards; 5) Least yellow cards; 6) Toss of a coin in an event of a tie of two clubs.
(C) Champions

==== Results summary ====
Overall								Home						Away					
Pld	W	D	L	GF	GA	GD	Pts	W	D	L	GF	GA	GD	W	D	L	GF	GA	GD
26	12	6	8	35	31	+4	42	6	3	4	19	19	0	6	3	4	16	12	+4

Last updated: 8 March 2021.
Source: Ultimate A-League

==== Results by round ====
Round	1	2	3	4	5	6	7	8	9	10	11	12	13	14	15	16	17	18	19	20	21	22	23	24	25	26
Ground	H	A	H	A	H	H	H	A	A	A	H	H	A	H	H	A	A	H	H	A	A	A	A	A	H	H
Result	W	W	L	W	L	W	W	W	L	W	W	D	L	D	W	D	L	D	L	D	D	W	L	W	L	W
Position	1	1	3	1	2	1	1	1	1	1	1	1	1	1	1	1	2	2	3	2	2	2	4	3	3	3

Updated to match(es) played on 8 March 2021. Source: Ultimate A-League
A = Away; H = Home; W = Win; D = Draw; L = Loss

==== Matches ====
The 2020–21 A-League fixtures were announced on 24 November 2020.

31 December 2020 1	Central Coast Mariners	1–0	Newcastle Jets	Gosford
19:05 AEDT	Kuol 43'	Report		Stadium: Central Coast Stadium; Attendance: 5,273; Referee: Stephen Lucas

3 January 2021 2	Macarthur FC	0–2	Central Coast Mariners	Sydney
16:05 AEDT		Report	De Silva 35'; Smylie 89'	Stadium: Campbelltown Stadium; Attendance: 4,538; Referee: Daniel Elder

19 January 2021 3	Central Coast Mariners	0–1	Western Sydney Wanderers	Gosford
19:05 AEDT		Report	Müller 83'	Stadium: Central Coast Stadium; Attendance: 4,659; Referee: Kurt Ams

22 January 2021 4	Sydney FC	0–2	Central Coast Mariners	Sydney
19:05 AEDT		Report	Warland 53' (o.g.); Kuol 74'	Stadium: Jubilee Stadium; Attendance: 5,320; Referee: Ben Abraham

31 January 2021 5	Central Coast Mariners	1–2	Wellington Phoenix	Gosford
16:00 AEDT	Kuol 41'	Report	Dávila 15'; Sotirio 88'	Stadium: Central Coast Stadium; Attendance: 4,748; Referee: Daniel Elder

3 February 2021 6	Central Coast Mariners	3–2	Melbourne City	Gosford
19:05 AEST	Casella 41'; Simon 57' (pen.); De Silva 80'	Report	Luna 23'; Maclaren 31'	Stadium: Central Coast Stadium; Attendance: 3,073; Referee: Stephen Lucas

7 February 2021 7	Central Coast Mariners	3–2	Western United	Gosford
18:00 AEDT	Simon 17'; Kuol 77', 81'	Report	Uskok 4'; Berisha 42'	Stadium: Central Coast Stadium; Attendance: 5,019; Referee: Alireza Faghani

14 February 2021 8	Wellington Phoenix	0–2	Central Coast Mariners	Wollongong
16:05 AEDT		Report	Simon 40'; Bozanic 50' (pen.)	Stadium: WIN Stadium; Attendance: 2,248; Referee: Daniel Elder

19 February 2021 9	Adelaide United	3–2	Central Coast Mariners	Adelaide
18:35 ACDT	Juric 34' (pen.), 70' (pen.), 85' (pen.)	Report	De Silva 15'; Kuol 63'	Stadium: Coopers Stadium; Attendance: 6,339; Referee: Adam Fielding

2 March 2021 10	Perth Glory	1–2	Central Coast Mariners	Perth
18:20 AWST	Fornaroli 65'	Report	Simon 6'; Urena 40'	Stadium: HBF Park; Attendance: 4,125; Referee: Daniel Elder

8 March 2021 11	Central Coast Mariners	2–0	Macarthur FC	Gosford
18:00 AEST	Simon 9'; Hatch 81'	Report		Stadium: Central Coast Stadium; Attendance: 5,003; Referee: Chris Beath

14 March 2021 12	Central Coast Mariners	2–2	Perth Glory	Gosford
18:00 AEST	Urena 25'; Simon 90' (pen.)	Report	Fornaroli 41'; D'Agostino 76'	Stadium: Central Coast Stadium; Attendance: 3,573; Referee: Kurt Ams

22 March 2021 13	Melbourne City	2–0	Central Coast Mariners	Melbourne
19:05 AEDT	Maclaren 31'; Atkinson 56'	Report		Stadium: Melbourne Rectangular Stadium; Attendance: 4,010; Referee: Chris Beath

27 March 2021 14	Central Coast Mariners	1–1	Melbourne Victory	Gosford
19:10 AEDT	Urena 30'	Report	McManaman 20'	Stadium: Central Coast Stadium; Attendance: 5,730; Referee: Alireza Faghani

1 April 2021 15	Central Coast Mariners	2–1	Adelaide United	Gosford
19:40 AEDT	Bozanic 72'; Kuol 76'	Report	Yengi 48'	Stadium: Central Coast Stadium; Attendance: 5,053; Referee: Shaun Evans

6 April 2021 16	Western Sydney Wanderers	2–2	Central Coast Mariners	Sydney
19:05 AEST	Kamau 74', 78'	Report	Simon 22'; Bozanic 83' (pen.)	Stadium: Western Sydney Stadium; Attendance: 9,755; Referee: Chris Beath

17 April 2021 17	Western United	1–0	Central Coast Mariners	Launceston
17:05 AEST	Pain 5'	Report		Stadium: UTAS Stadium; Attendance: 3,203; Referee: Alireza Faghani

24 April 2021 18	Central Coast Mariners	2–2	Sydney FC	Gosford
17:05 AEST	Urena 6'; Simon 41'	Report	Ninkovic 45+2'; Buhagiar 83'	Stadium: Central Coast Stadium; Attendance: 10,173; Referee: Chris Beath

28 April 2021 19	Central Coast Mariners	0–4	Brisbane Roar	Gosford
19:05 AEST		Report	Gillesphey 19'; Champness 56'; Parsons 89'; Kudo 90+3'	Stadium: Central Coast Stadium; Attendance: 4,460; Referee: Alex King

2 May 2021 20	Melbourne Victory	1–1	Central Coast Mariners	Melbourne
16:05 AEST	McManaman 62'	Report	Simon 4'	Stadium: Melbourne Rectangular Stadium; Attendance: 4,019; Referee: Jonathan Barreiro

12 May 2021 21	Brisbane Roar	0–0	Central Coast Mariners	Brisbane
19:05 AEST		Report		Stadium: Dolphin Stadium; Attendance: 2,064; Referee: Chris Beath

15 May 2021 22	Newcastle Jets	0–1	Central Coast Mariners	Newcastle
19:10 AEST		Report	Simon 54' (pen.)	Stadium: Newcastle International Sports Centre; Attendance: 5,080; Referee: Jonathan Barreiro

22 May 2021 23	Melbourne City	1–0	Central Coast Mariners	Melbourne
19:10 AEST	Noone 59'	Report		Stadium: AAMI Park; Attendance: 8,124; Referee: Shaun Evans

27 May 2021 24	Macarthur FC	1–2	Central Coast Mariners	Campbelltown
19:05 AEDT	Susaeta 17'	Report	Clisby 31'; De Silva 55'	Stadium: Campbelltown Stadium; Attendance: 4,379; Referee: Chris Beath

1 June 2021 25	Central Coast Mariners	0–2	Newcastle Jets	Gosford
19:05 AEST		Report	O'Donovan 27'; Mauragis 33'	Stadium: Central Coast Stadium; Attendance: 4,973; Referee: Stephen Lucas

5 June 2021 26	Central Coast Mariners	2–0	Western United	Gosford
17:05 AEST	Clisby 25'; Ureña 90+5'	Report		Stadium: Central Coast Stadium; Attendance: 6,451; Referee: Jack Morgan

==== Finals series ====
12 June 2021 Elimination-final	Central Coast Mariners	0–2 (a.e.t.)	Macarthur FC	Gosford
19:05 AEST		Report	M'Mombwa 93'; Ruhs 120+1'	Stadium: Central Coast Stadium; Attendance: 11,565; Referee: Shaun Evans

== Statistics ==
=== Appearances and goals ===
Includes all competitions. Players with no appearances not included in the list.

No.	Pos	Nat	Player	Total		A-League		A-League Finals	
No.	Pos	Nat	Player	Apps	Goals	Apps	Goals	Apps	Goals
1	GK	(Australia) AUS	Mark Birighitti	27	0	26	0	1	0
3	DF	(Australia) AUS	Lewis Miller	13	0	1+11	0	0+1	0
4	MF	(Australia) AUS	Josh Nisbet	25	0	17+7	0	1	0
5	DF	(Australia) AUS	Stefan Nigro	27	0	25+1	0	1	0
6	DF	(Australia) AUS	Gianni Stensness	23	0	21+1	0	1	0
7	MF	(Serbia) SRB	Stefan Janković	1	0	0+1	0	0	0
8	MF	(Australia) AUS	Oliver Bozanic	24	3	24	3	0	0
10	FW	(Australia) AUS	Daniel De Silva	22	4	20+1	4	1	0
11	DF	(Australia) AUS	Jack Clisby	27	2	26	2	1	0
12	FW	(Costa Rica) CRC	Marco Ureña	22	5	18+3	5	1	0
14	MF	(Australia) AUS	Daniel Bouman	26	0	13+12	0	1	0
15	DF	(Australia) AUS	Kye Rowles	27	0	26	0	1	0
19	FW	(Australia) AUS	Matt Simon	27	10	26	10	1	0
21	DF	(Australia) AUS	Ruon Tongyik	23	0	23	0	0	0
22	MF	(Poland) POL	Michał Janota	16	0	5+10	0	0+1	0
23	DF	(Australia) AUS	Dan Hall	6	0	3+2	0	1	0
25	MF	(Australia) AUS	Matt Hatch	5	1	0+4	1	0+1	0
26	FW	(Australia) AUS	Jaden Casella	20	1	4+16	1	0	0
29	FW	(Australia) AUS	Alou Kuol	26	7	7+18	7	0+1	0
30	FW	(Australia) AUS	Jordan Smylie	12	1	0+12	1	0	0
32	FW	(Australia) AUS	Max Balard	5	0	1+4	0	0	0
41	FW	(Australia) AUS	Jing Reec	1	0	0+1	0	0	0

- Source: Soccerway

=== Disciplinary record ===
Includes all competitions. The list is sorted by squad number when total cards are equal. Players with no cards not included in the list.

No.	Pos	Nat	Player	Total			A-League			A-League Finals		
No.	Pos	Nat	Player	Yellow card	Second yellow card	Red card	Yellow card	Second yellow card	Red card	Yellow card	Second yellow card	Red card
15	DF	(Australia) AUS	Kye Rowles	5	0	1	5	0	1	0	0	0
12	FW	(Costa Rica) CRC	Marco Ureña	1	0	1	1	0	1	0	0	0
21	DF	(Australia) AUS	Ruon Tongyik	8	0	0	8	0	0	0	0	0
6	DF	(Australia) AUS	Gianni Stensness	6	0	0	6	0	0	0	0	0
19	FW	(Australia) AUS	Matt Simon	6	0	0	6	0	0	0	0	0
29	FW	(Australia) AUS	Alou Kuol	5	0	0	5	0	0	0	0	0
11	DF	(Australia) AUS	Jack Clisby	4	0	0	3	0	0	1	0	0
8	MF	(Australia) AUS	Oliver Bozanic	2	0	0	2	0	0	0	0	0
1	GK	(Australia) AUS	Mark Birighitti	1	0	0	1	0	0	0	0	0
3	DF	(Australia) AUS	Lewis Miller	1	0	0	1	0	0	0	0	0
4	MF	(Australia) AUS	Josh Nisbet	1	0	0	1	0	0	0	0	0
5	DF	(Australia) AUS	Stefan Nigro	1	0	0	1	0	0	0	0	0
10	FW	(Australia) AUS	Daniel De Silva	1	0	0	1	0	0	0	0	0
14	MF	(Australia) AUS	Daniel Bouman	1	0	0	1	0	0	0	0	0
23	DF	(Australia) AUS	Dan Hall	1	0	0	0	0	0	1	0	0
26	FW	(Australia) AUS	Jaden Casella	1	0	0	1	0	0	0	0	0

- Source: Soccerway
- (yellow card) = Number of bookings; (second yellow card) = Number of sending offs after a second yellow card; (red card) = Number of sending offs by a direct red card.

== Awards ==
- Young Player of the Year nominee (February): Alou Kuol
- A-League Goalkeeper of the Year: Mark Birighitti
- PFA A-League Team of the Season: Mark Birighitti, Oliver Bozanic, Matt Simon, Ruon Tongyik
