= 2018–19 Central Coast Mariners FC season =

Central Coast Mariners
2018–19 season
- Chairman: Michael Charlesworth
- Manager: Mike Mulvey (to 10 March 2019); Alen Stajcic (caretaker) (from 10 March 2019)
- Stadium: Central Coast Stadium, Gosford
- A-League: 10th
- FFA Cup: Round of 32
- Top goalscorer: League: Matt Simon (7 goals); All: Matt Simon (7 goals)
- Highest home attendance: 8,923 vs. Newcastle Jets (23 December 2018)
- Lowest home attendance: 3,703 vs. Wellington Phoenix (9 March 2019)
- Average home league attendance: 5,562
Home colours	Away colours	Third colours

The 2018–19 season was the 14th season for Central Coast Mariners FC since its establishment in 2004. The club participated in the A-League for the 14th time and the FFA Cup for the fifth time.

== Review ==
The Mariners were defeated in the first round of the 2018 FFA Cup by Adelaide United.

This season saw the appointment of Mike Mulvey as head coach following the departure of Paul Okon late in the previous season. Mike Mulvey lasted only until round 21 before becoming the forth coach sacked in 5 seasons. In the transfer window, the club re-signed two former players: all-time top scorer Matt Simon and New Zealand midfielder Michael McGlinchey. In pre-season, Jamaican Olympic sprint champion Usain Bolt also came to the club to train on an indefinite basis. Mulvey was sacked by the Mariners following their 8–2 loss at home against Wellington Phoenix. Alen Stajcic was named as caretaker to carry out the remainder of the season.

== Background ==
The Mariners ended the previous A-League season in last place after losing to F3 Derby rivals Newcastle Jets 8–2 on the final matchday. Paul Okon had stepped down as head coach late in the season and his replacement, Wayne O'Sullivan, had his contract terminated soon after season's end. Former Gold Coast United and Brisbane Roar coach Mike Mulvey was named as the new coach in April 2018.

== Players ==
=== First team squad ===
As of 1 March 2019

Note: Flags indicate national team as defined under FIFA eligibility rules; some limited exceptions apply. Players may hold more than one non-FIFA nationality.

No.	Pos.	Nation	Player
1	GK	AUS	Ben Kennedy
2	DF	AUS	Jonathan Aspropotamitis
3	DF	AUS	Jack Clisby
6	MF	NED	Tom Hiariej
7	MF	AUS	Andrew Hoole
8	MF	NZL	Michael McGlinchey
10	FW	AUS	Tommy Oar
11	FW	AUS	Connor Pain
12	GK	AUS	Adam Pearce
13	MF	AUS	Aiden O'Neill (on loan from Burnley)
15	DF	AUS	Kye Rowles
17	FW	AUS	Peter Kekeris (Scholarship)

No.	Pos.	Nation	Player
18	MF	AUS	Matthew Millar
19	FW	AUS	Matt Simon
21	FW	AUS	Corey Gameiro
22	MF	AUS	Jacob Melling
23	MF	AUS	Mario Shabow
24	GK	AUS	Joe Gauci
25	FW	AUS	Jordan Murray
26	MF	AUS	Josh Nisbet
28	DF	ENG	Sam Graham (on loan from Sheffield United)
29	MF	IRL	Stephen Mallon (on loan from Sheffield United)
68	MF	TUR	Jem Karacan

== Transfers ==
=== Transfers in ===
No.	Position	Player	Transferred from	Type/fee	Contract length	Date	Ref
3	DF	Jack Clisby		Free transfer	1 year	7 May 2018	
21	FW	Corey Gameiro		Free transfer	1 year	8 May 2018	
19	FW	Matt Simon	Sydney FC	Free transfer	2 years	10 May 2018	
2	DF	Jonathan Aspropotamitis	Western Sydney Wanderers	Free transfer	1 year	14 May 2018	
23	MF	Mario Shabow	Newcastle Jets	Free transfer	2 years	7 June 2018	
24	GK	Joe Gauci	(Australia) West Torrens Birkalla	Free transfer	2 years	19 June 2018	
8	MF	(New Zealand) Michael McGlinchey		Free transfer	2 years	26 June 2018	
20	DF	(Mali) Kalifa Cissé		Free transfer	1 year	28 June 2018	
18	MF	Matthew Millar	(Australia) South Melbourne	Free transfer	1 year	9 July 2018	
16	MF	Josh Macdonald	(Australia) Wollongong Wolves	Free transfer	1 year	6 August 2018	
25	FW	Jordan Murray	(Australia) APIA Leichhardt Tigers	Free transfer	1 year	6 August 2018	
13	MF	Aiden O'Neill	(England) Burnley	Loan	1 year	15 August 2018	
44	FW	(Scotland) Ross McCormack	(England) Aston Villa	Loan	1 year	20 September 2018	
10	FW	Tommy Oar		Free transfer	2 years	20 September 2018	
68	MF	(Turkey) Jem Karacan		Free transfer	1 year	24 January 2019	
28	DF	(England) Sam Graham	(England) Sheffield United	Loan	1 year	31 January 2019	
29	MF	(Republic of Ireland) Stephen Mallon	(England) Sheffield United	Loan	1 year	31 January 2019	

=== Transfers out ===
No.	Position	Player	Transferred to	Type/fee	Date	Ref
3	DF	Joshua Rose	Retired		9 April 2018	
2	DF	(New Zealand) Storm Roux		End of contract	18 April 2018	
8	FW	Blake Powell		End of contract	18 April 2018	
16	MF	Liam Rose		End of contract	18 April 2018	
17	FW	Josh Bingham		End of contract	18 April 2018	
18	GK	Tom Glover	(England) Tottenham Hotspur	Loan return	18 April 2018	
19	DF	Jacob Poscoliero		End of contract	18 April 2018	
27	FW	Peter Skapetis		End of contract	18 April 2018	
12	FW	Trent Buhagiar		Mutual contract termination	4 May 2018	
23	MF	(Netherlands) Wout Brama	(Netherlands) Twente	Free transfer	1 June 2018	
15	DF	(Spain) Alan Baró		Mutual contract termination	5 June 2018	
10	MF	Daniel De Silva	Sydney FC	Loan	25 July 2018	
44	FW	(Scotland) Ross McCormack	(England) Aston Villa	Loan return	5 January 2019	
5	DF	Antony Golec	Wellington Phoenix	Free transfer	30 January 2019	
20	DF	(Mali) Kalifa Cissé	Retired		30 January 2019	
14	MF	Adam Berry		Mutual contract termination	1 February 2019	
4	DF	Jake McGing	(Poland) Wisła Płock	$29,000	1 March 2019	
16	FW	Josh Macdonald		Mutual contract termination	15 March 2019	

=== From academy squad ===
N	Pos.	Nat.	Name	Age	Notes
17	FW	(Australia)	Peter Kekeris	19	1 year scholarship contract
26	MF	(Australia)	Josh Nisbet	19	0.5 year contract

=== Contracts extensions ===
No.	Name	Position	Duration	Date	Notes
5	Antony Golec	Left back	1 year	25 April 2018	
22	Jacob Melling	Defensive midfielder	2 years	26 April 2018	
21	Kye Rowles	Central defender	1 year	9 May 2018	
11	Connor Pain	Winger	1 year	9 May 2018	
1	Ben Kennedy	Goalkeeper	1 year	19 June 2018	
12	Adam Pearce	Goalkeeper	1 year	19 June 2018	
3	Jack Clisby	Left back	2 years	12 April 2019	
25	Jordan Murray	Forward	2 years	17 April 2019	

=== Technical staff ===
Position	Staff
Head coach	(Australia) Alen Stajcic (caretaker)
Assistant coach	(Scotland) Nick Montgomery
Goalkeeping coach	(Australia) Matthew Nash
Strength and conditioning coach	
Physiotherapist	(Australia) Murray Leyland
Youth football coach	(Australia) Ben Cahn
Head of sports science	(Australia) Tim Knight

== Squad statistics ==
=== Appearances and goals ===
N	Pos.	Nat.	Name	Total					A-League					FFA Cup
N	Pos.	Nat.	Name	Apps	Goals	Yellow card	Second yellow card	Red card	Apps	Goals	Yellow card	Second yellow card	Red card	Apps	Goals	Yellow card	Second yellow card	Red card
1	GK	(Australia)	Ben Kennedy	22	0	1	0	0	22+0	0	1	0	0	0+0	0	0	0	0
2	DF	(Australia)	Jonathan Aspro	13	0	2	0	0	13+0	0	2	0	0	0+0	0	0	0	0
3	DF	(Australia)	Jack Clisby	21	1	3	0	0	16+4	1	3	0	0	1+0	0	0	0	0
6	MF	(Netherlands)	Tom Hiariej	16	0	1	0	0	13+3	0	1	0	0	0+0	0	0	0	0
7	MF	(Australia)	Andrew Hoole	21	4	4	0	0	14+7	4	4	0	0	0+0	0	0	0	0
8	MF	(New Zealand)	Michael McGlinchey	21	0	2	0	0	11+9	0	2	0	0	1+0	0	0	0	0
10	FW	(Australia)	Tommy Oar	11	0	1	0	0	6+5	0	1	0	0	0+0	0	0	0	0
11	FW	(Australia)	Connor Pain	25	5	3	0	0	21+3	5	3	0	0	1+0	0	0	0	0
12	GK	(Australia)	Adam Pearce	4	0	0	0	0	3+0	0	0	0	0	1+0	0	0	0	0
13	MF	(Australia)	Aiden O'Neill	21	4	9	1	0	20+1	4	9	1	0	0+0	0	0	0	0
15	DF	(Australia)	Kye Rowles	21	0	8	0	1	20+0	0	8	0	1	1+0	0	0	0	0
17	FW	(Australia)	Peter Kekeris†	4	0	0	0	0	0+3	0	0	0	0	0+1	0	0	0	0
18	MF	(Australia)	Matthew Millar	22	1	0	0	0	20+2	1	0	0	0	0+0	0	0	0	0
19	FW	(Australia)	Matt Simon	21	5	7	1	0	18+2	5	7	1	0	1+0	0	0	0	0
21	FW	(Australia)	Corey Gameiro	0	0	0	0	0	0+0	0	0	0	0	0+0	0	0	0	0
22	MF	(Australia)	Jacob Melling	21	0	6	0	0	15+5	0	6	0	0	1+0	0	0	0	0
23	MF	(Australia)	Mario Shabow	11	1	1	0	0	3+8	1	1	0	0	0+0	0	0	0	0
24	GK	(Australia)	Joe Gauci	0	0	0	0	0	0+0	0	0	0	0	0+0	0	0	0	0
25	FW	(Australia)	Jordan Murray	21	3	2	0	0	11+10	3	2	0	0	0+0	0	0	0	0
26	MF	(Australia)	Josh Nisbet†	5	0	1	0	0	1+3	0	1	0	0	1+0	0	0	0	0
27	DF	(Australia)	Charles M'Mombwa†	2	0	0	0	0	0+1	0	0	0	0	0+1	0	0	0	0
27	DF	(Australia)	Alec Vinci†	1	0	0	0	0	0+0	0	0	0	0	0+1	0	0	0	0
28	DF	(England)	Sam Graham	6	0	0	0	0	6+0	0	0	0	0	0+0	0	0	0	0
29	MF	(Republic of Ireland)	Stephen Mallon	8	1	0	0	0	6+2	1	0	0	0	0+0	0	0	0	0
31	FW	(Australia)	Jordan Smylie†	0	0	0	0	0	0+0	0	0	0	0	0+0	0	0	0	0
33	DF	(Australia)	Lewis Miller†	1	0	0	0	0	0+1	0	0	0	0	0+0	0	0	0	0
34	DF	(Australia)	Michael Glassock†	0	0	0	0	0	0+0	0	0	0	0	0+0	0	0	0	0
68	MF	(Turkey)	Jem Karacan	8	1	4	1	0	7+1	1	4	1	0	0+0	0	0	0	0
Out on loan:
10	MF	(Australia)	Daniel De Silva	0	0	0	0	0	0+0	0	0	0	0	0+0	0	0	0	0
Players no longer at the club:
4	MF	(Australia)	Jake McGing	9	0	1	0	0	7+1	0	1	0	0	1+0	0	0	0	0
5	DF	(Australia)	Anthony Golec	0	0	0	0	0	0+0	0	0	0	0	0+0	0	0	0	0
14	MF	(Australia)	Adam Berry	1	0	0	0	0	0+0	0	0	0	0	1+0	0	0	0	0
16	MF	(Australia)	Josh Macdonald	2	0	0	0	0	0+2	0	0	0	0	0+0	0	0	0	0
20	DF	(Mali)	Kalifa Cissé	9	0	2	2	0	8+0	0	2	2	0	1+0	0	0	0	0
44	FW	(Scotland)	Ross McCormack	5	1	0	0	0	5+0	1	0	0	0	0+0	0	0	0	0

- Last updated: 14 April 2019
- Source: au.soccerway.com
- (yellow card) = Number of bookings; (second yellow card) = Number of sending offs after a second yellow card; (red card) = Number of sending offs by a direct red card.

† = Scholarship or NPL/NYL-listed player

== Pre-season and friendlies ==
14 August 2018	Central Coast Mariners (Australia)	6–0	(Australia) Adamstown Rosebud	Lisarow
	Hiariej 2'; Pain 28'; Simon 32' (pen.); Macdonald 50', 63'; Millar 65'	Report		Stadium: Pluim Park

25 August 2018	Newcastle Jets (Australia)	2–2	(Australia) Central Coast Mariners	Maitland
	Hoffman 41'; O'Donovan 61'	Report	Clisby 11'; Pain 65'	Stadium: Maitland Sportsground

31 August 2018	Central Coast Mariners (Australia)	6–1	(Australia) Central Coast Select	Gosford
19:30	Clisby 1', 41'; McGlinchey 12'; Kekeris 14'; Shabow 29'; Macdonald 57'	Report	Knight 76'	Stadium: Central Coast Stadium; Attendance: 9,958

13 September 2018	Central Coast Mariners (Australia)	3–0	(Australia) Western Sydney Wanderers	Lisarow
	Simon 1'; Hiariej 15'; McGlinchey 16'	Report		Stadium: Pluim Park

19 September 2018	Central Coast Mariners (Australia)	4–0	(Australia) Central Coast United	Lisarow
19:00	Simon 4', 9', 59'; Shabow 50'	Report		Stadium: Pluim Park

25 September 2018	Central Coast Mariners (Australia)	?–?	(Australia) North Shore Mariners	Central Coast
		Report		Attendance: 0

5 October 2018	Wollongong Wolves (Australia)	1–3	(Australia) Central Coast Mariners	Wollongong
19:30	Madden 24'	Report	McGlinchey 40'; Pain 45'; Simon 69'	Stadium: WIN Stadium; Attendance: 3,000

11 October 2018	Sydney FC (Australia)	2–0	(Australia) Central Coast Mariners	Sydney
	van der Linden 15'; Brosque 36'	Report		Stadium: Jubilee Oval; Attendance: 0 (behind closed doors)

12 October 2018	Macarthur South West United (Australia)	0–4	(Australia) Central Coast Mariners	Sydney
		Report	McCormack 8'; Murray 42'; Bolt 55', 69'	Stadium: Campbelltown Stadium

== Competitions ==
=== Overall ===
Competition	Started round	Final position / round	First match	Last match
A-League	—	10th	21 October 2018	26 April 2019
FFA Cup	Round of 32	Round of 32	1 August 2018	1 August 2018

=== A-League ===
==== League table ====
Pos	Team	Pld	W	D	L	GF	GA	GD	Pts	Qualification
1	Perth Glory	27	18	6	3	56	23	+33	60	Qualification for 2020 AFC Champions League group stage and Finals series (Note: The top two teams enter the Finals series at the semi-finals, while the teams ranked third to sixth enter the Finals series at the elimination-finals.)
2	Sydney FC (C)	27	16	4	7	43	29	+14	52	Qualification for 2020 AFC Champions League group stage and Finals series
3	Melbourne Victory	27	15	5	7	50	32	+18	50	Qualification for 2020 AFC Champions League preliminary round 2 and Finals series
4	Adelaide United	27	12	8	7	37	32	+5	44	Qualification for Finals series
5	Melbourne City	27	11	7	9	39	32	+7	40	Qualification for Finals series
6	Wellington Phoenix (Note: Wellington Phoenix cannot qualify for the AFC Champions League as they are not recognised as an AFC club.)	27	11	7	9	46	43	+3	40	Qualification for Finals series
7	Newcastle Jets	27	10	5	12	40	36	+4	35	
8	Western Sydney Wanderers	27	6	6	15	42	54	−12	24	
9	Brisbane Roar	27	4	6	17	38	71	−33	18	
10	Central Coast Mariners	27	3	4	20	31	70	−39	13	

Source: A-Leagues
Rules for classification: 1) points; 2) goal difference; 3) number of goals scored.
(C) Champions

==== Results summary ====
Overall								Home						Away					
Pld	W	D	L	GF	GA	GD	Pts	W	D	L	GF	GA	GD	W	D	L	GF	GA	GD
27	3	4	20	31	70	−39	13	2	2	8	17	32	−15	1	2	12	14	38	−24

Last updated: 14 April 2019.
Source: ultimatealeague.com

==== Results by round ====
Round	1	2	3	4	5	6	7	8	9	10	11	12	13	14	15	16	17	18	19	20	21	22	23	24	25	26	27
Ground	A	H	H	A	A	H	A	A	H	H	A	H	A	H	A	A	H	A	A	H	H	A	H	H	A	H	A
Result	D	D	L	L	L	L	L	L	L	L	L	W	L	D	L	L	L	L	D	L	L	W	L	L	L	W	L
Position	3	6	9	10	10	10	10	10	10	10	10	10	10	10	10	10	10	10	10	10	10	10	10	10	10	10	10

Updated to match(es) played on 14 April 2019. Source: ultimatealeague.com
A = Away; H = Home; W = Win; D = Draw; L = Loss

==== Matches ====
Win Draw Loss

21 October 2018 1	Brisbane Roar	1–1	Central Coast Mariners	Brisbane
17:00 AEDT (UTC+11)	Taggart 65'	Report	Pain 4'	Stadium: Suncorp Stadium; Attendance: 14,859; Referee: Chris Beath

27 October 2018 2	Central Coast Mariners	1–1	Melbourne City	Gosford
17:35 AEDT (UTC+11)	McCormack 21'	Report	Vidošić 84'	Stadium: Central Coast Stadium; Attendance: 7,144; Referee: Stephen Lucas

4 November 2018 3	Central Coast Mariners	0–3	Adelaide United	Gosford
17:00 AEDT (UTC+11)		Report	Goodwin 9', 56'; Stamatelopoulos 16'	Stadium: Central Coast Stadium; Attendance: 6,043; Referee: Alex King

11 November 2018 4	Melbourne Victory	4–1	Central Coast Mariners	Melbourne
19:00 AEDT (UTC+11)	Honda 30'; Troisi 35'; Brown 45+2'; Hope 90+4'	Report	Shabow 63'	Stadium: AAMI Park; Attendance: 16,508; Referee: Stephan Lucas

25 November 2018 5	Perth Glory	3–2	Central Coast Mariners	Perth
19:00 AEDT (UTC+11)	Ikonomidis 12', 90+5'; Lowry 61'	Report	Mrcela 36' (o.g.); O'Neill 64'	Stadium: nib Stadium; Attendance: 10,417; Referee: Jarred Gillett

1 December 2018 6	Central Coast Mariners	1–2	Sydney FC	Gosford
17:35 AEDT (UTC+11)	Simon 16'	Report	Le Fondre 42' (pen.); B. O'Neill 65'	Stadium: Central Coast Stadium; Attendance: 8,386; Referee: Daniel Elder

7 December 2018 7	Western Sydney Wanderers	2–0	Central Coast Mariners	Sydney
19:50 AEDT (UTC+11)	Baccus 45+3'; Sotirio 68'	Report		Stadium: Spotless Stadium; Attendance: 8,163; Referee: Jarred Gillett

15 December 2018 8	Wellington Phoenix	2–0	Central Coast Mariners	Wellington
17:35 AEDT (UTC+11)	Fenton 9'; Singh 45'	Report		Stadium: Westpac Stadium; Attendance: 6,970; Referee: Shaun Evans

23 December 2018 9	Central Coast Mariners	1–2	Newcastle Jets	Gosford
17:00 AEDT (UTC+11)	Simon 36'	Report	Hoffman 66'; Vargas 82'	Stadium: Central Coast Stadium; Attendance: 8,923; Referee: Alex King

31 December 2018 10	Central Coast Mariners	1–4	Perth Glory	Gosford
19:00 AEDT (UTC+11)	Murray 77'	Report	Keogh 3', 90+2'; Ferreira 23', 41'	Stadium: Central Coast Stadium; Attendance: 6,048; Referee: Kurt Ams

4 January 2019 11	Sydney FC	5–2	Central Coast Mariners	Sydney
19:50 AEDT (UTC+11)	Brosque 49', 58', 64'; Le Fondre 52' (pen.); Calver 90'	Report	Pain 17'; A. O'Neill 66'	Stadium: Jubilee Oval; Attendance: 12,053; Referee: Jonathan Barreiro

12 January 2019 13	Wellington Phoenix	3–2	Central Coast Mariners	Wellington
17:35 AEDT (UTC+11)	Krishna 48' (pen.), 58' (pen.); Williams 65'	Report	Simon 8' (pen.); Hoole 21'	Stadium: Westpac Stadium; Attendance: 10,186; Referee: Alex King

16 January 2019 12	Central Coast Mariners	2–1	Melbourne City	Gosford
19:50 AEDT (UTC+11)	Pain 32'; Simon 89'	Report	Wales 77'	Stadium: Central Coast Stadium; Attendance: 4,103; Referee: Jarred Gillett

20 January 2019 14	Central Coast Mariners	1–1	Brisbane Roar	Gosford
19:00 AEDT (UTC+11)	Millar 3'	Report	DeVere 45+1'	Stadium: Central Coast Stadium; Attendance: 4,873; Referee: Matthew Conger

23 January 2019 15	Newcastle Jets	1–0	Central Coast Mariners	Newcastle
19:50 AEDT (UTC+11)	Sheppard 54'	Report		Stadium: McDonald Jones Stadium; Attendance: 9,466; Referee: Shaun Evans

27 January 2019 16	Adelaide United	2–1	Central Coast Mariners	Adelaide
18:00 AEDT (UTC+11)	Isaías 66'; Blackwood 90+2'	Report	Hoole 37'	Stadium: Coopers Stadium; Attendance: 7,965; Referee: Jarred Gillett

2 February 2019 17	Central Coast Mariners	2–3	Melbourne Victory	Gosford
17:35 AEDT (UTC+11)	Hoole 18', 45+4'	Report	Troisi 50'; Kennedy 68' (o.g.); Barbarouses 88'	Stadium: Central Coast Stadium; Attendance: 5,223; Referee: Kurt Ams

9 February 2019 18	Western Sydney Wanderers	2–0	Central Coast Mariners	Sydney
17:35 AEDT (UTC+11)	Elrich 45'; Sotirio 77'	Report		Stadium: Spotless Stadium; Attendance: 5,364; Referee: Shaun Evans

17 February 2019 19	Sydney FC	1–1	Central Coast Mariners	Sydney
17:00 AEDT (UTC+11)	Le Fondre 76' (pen.)	Report	A. O'Neill 36'	Stadium: Leichhardt Oval; Attendance: 12,188; Referee: Jarred Gillett

22 February 2019 20	Central Coast Mariners	3–5	Brisbane Roar	Gosford
19:50 AEDT (UTC+11)	Pain 38'; O'Neill 45+2'; Murray 82'	Report	Bauthéac 31'; López 36', 54'; Mikkelsen 45'; Wenzel-Halls 74'	Stadium: Central Coast Stadium; Attendance: 4,173; Referee: Stephan Lucas

9 March 2019 21	Central Coast Mariners	2–8	Wellington Phoenix	Gosford
19:50 AEDT (UTC+11)	Clisby 61'; Mallon 69'	Report	Graham 8' (o.g.); Krishna 12', 45+1'; Williams 21'; Cacace 51'; Singh 57', 88'; Fenton 59'	Stadium: Central Coast Stadium; Attendance: 3,703; Referee: Chris Beath

16 March 2019 22	Newcastle Jets	2–3	Central Coast Mariners	Newcastle
17:35 AEDT (UTC+11)	O'Donovan 74'; Vargas 81'	Report	Murray 51'; Karacan 64'; Pain 67'	Stadium: McDonald Jones Stadium; Attendance: 8,173; Referee: Adam Kersey

31 March 2019 23	Central Coast Mariners	0–1	Adelaide United	Gosford
17:00 AEDT (UTC+11)		Report	Isaías 35'	Stadium: Central Coast Stadium; Attendance: 4,683; Referee: Kurt Ams

7 April 2019 24	Central Coast Mariners	0–3	Perth Glory	Gosford
19:00 AEST (UTC+10)		Report	Chianese 12'; Djulbic 29'; Kilkenny 57' (pen.)	Stadium: Central Coast Stadium; Attendance: 3,939; Referee: Daniel Elder

14 April 2019 25	Melbourne Victory	2–1	Central Coast Mariners	Melbourne
17:00 AEST (UTC+10)	Toivonen 21'; Niedermeier 79'	Report	Simon 53' (pen.)	Stadium: AAMI Park; Attendance: 16,158; Referee: Chris Beath

20 April 2019 26	Central Coast Mariners	3–1	Western Sydney Wanderers	Gosford
19:50 AEST (UTC+10)	Simon 34', 52' (pen.); Rowles 56'	Report	Bridge 67' (pen.)	Stadium: Central Coast Stadium; Attendance: 5,059; Referee: Adam Kersey

26 April 2019 27	Melbourne City	5–0	Central Coast Mariners	Melbourne
19:50 AEST (UTC+10)	Harrison 35', 55'; McGree 42'; Vidošić 50'; Najjarine 90+2'	Report		Stadium: AAMI Park; Attendance: 4,950; Referee: Kurt Ams

=== FFA Cup ===
1 August 2018 Round of 32	Adelaide United	3–0	Central Coast Mariners	Adelaide
19:00 ACST	Elsey 12'; Boland 19'; Goodwin 53'	Report		Stadium: Marden Sports Complex; Attendance: 3,107; Referee: Shaun Evans
