= Stefan Janković =

Stefan Janković may refer to:

- Stefan Janković (basketball) (born 1993), Serbian basketball player
- Stefan Janković (footballer) (born 1997), Serbian footballer
