= Kye Rowles =

Australian soccer player (born 1998)

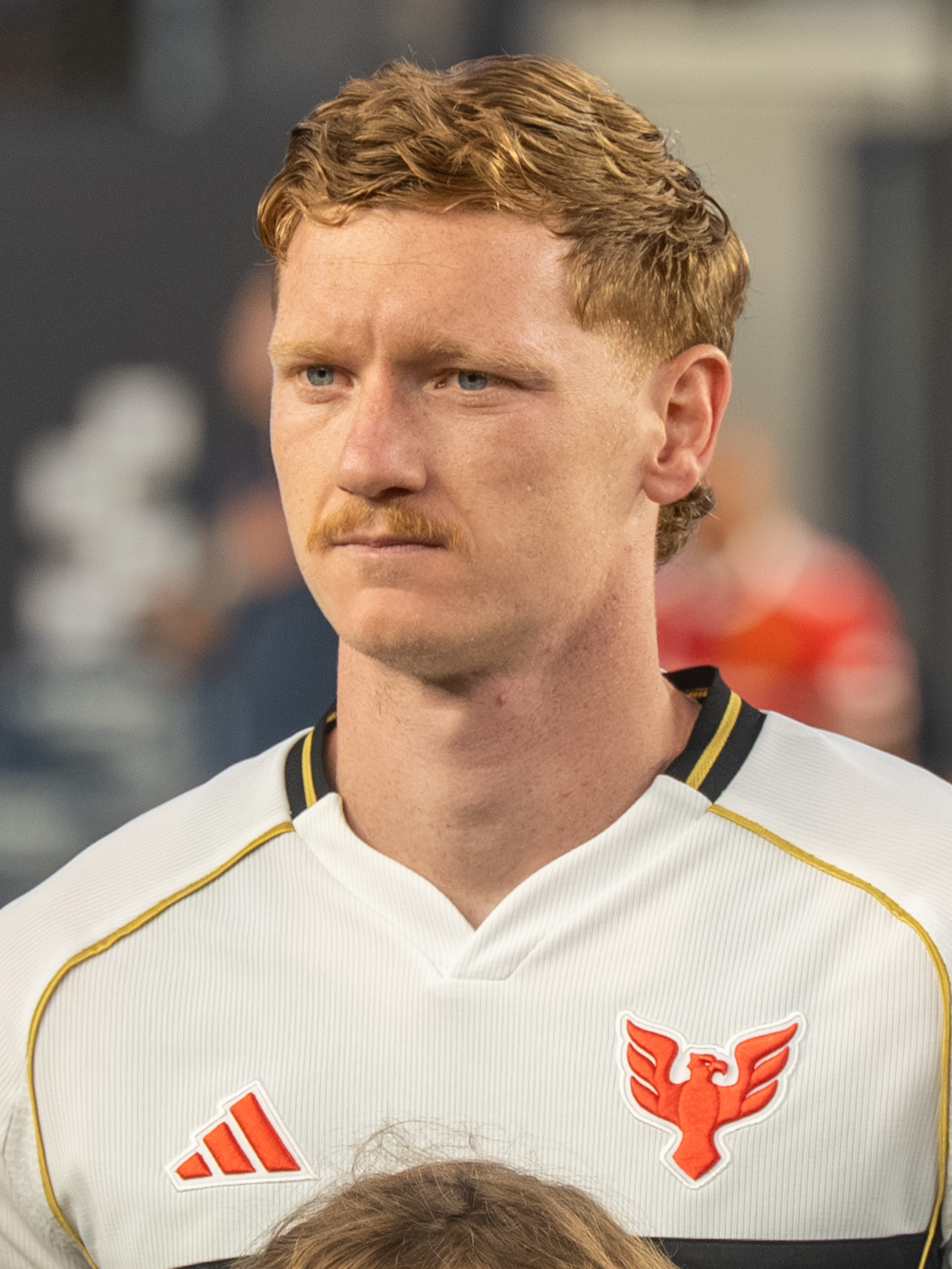
- Rowles with DC United in 2025

Personal information
- Full name: Kye Francis Rowles
- Date of birth: 24 June 1998 (age 28)
- Place of birth: Kiama, New South Wales, Australia
- Height: 1.85 m (6 ft 1 in)
- Position: Central defender

Team information
- Current team: D.C. United
- Number: 15

Youth career
- QAS

Senior career*
Years	Team	Apps	(Gls)
2014–2015	FFA CoE	1	(0)
2016–2017	Brisbane Roar NPL	5	(0)
2016–2017	Brisbane Roar	2	(0)
2017–2022	Central Coast Mariners	104	(2)
2022–2025	Heart of Midlothian	82	(1)
2025–	D.C. United	31	(1)

International career^{‡}
2013–2015	Australia U17	15	(0)
2016	Australia U20	4	(0)
2019–2021	Australia U23	5	(0)
2022–	Australia	29	(1)
Medal record
Men's football
Representing Australia
AFF U-19 Youth Championship
First place	2016 Vietnam	U-20 Team
AFF U-16 Youth Championship
Third place	2013 Myanmar	U-17 Team
- * Club domestic league appearances and goals as of 25 October 2025 ‡ National team caps and goals as of 31 March 2026

Kye Francis Rowles (born 24 June 1998) is an Australian professional soccer player who plays as a central defender for Major League Soccer club D.C. United and the Australia national team.

Rowles began his professional career with Brisbane Roar in 2016 before moving to Central Coast Mariners in 2017. In 2022 he signed for Scottish club Heart of Midlothian. He has represented Australia at under-17 level, including at the 2015 FIFA U-17 World Cup, under-23 level at the Tokyo Olympics and at senior level at the 2022 FIFA World Cup.

== Club career ==
=== Brisbane Roar ===
In May 2016, Rowles signed his first professional contract with Brisbane Roar on a two-year deal along with fellow young defender Connor O'Toole. Rowles made his first competitive start for the Roar in a loss to Ulsan Hyundai in the AFC Champions League on 28 February 2017.

=== Central Coast Mariners ===
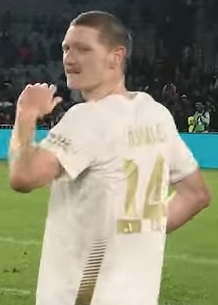
Rowles with A-Leagues All Stars.

Rowles moved to Central Coast Mariners on a one-year contract in June 2017. He made his Mariners' A-League debut on 18 November 2017, following an injury to Josh Rose, in a loss to Adelaide United.

Rowles played for the Mariners in the 2021 FFA Cup Final, which the Mariners lost 2–1. Rowles was jointly awarded the Mark Viduka Medal along with Jake Brimmer, becoming the first player to win the medal while playing for the losing team. He is also the only person to consecutively win the Mariners Medal.

=== Heart of Midlothian ===
On 9 June 2022, Rowles joined Scottish Premiership side Heart of Midlothian for an undisclosed fee and signed a three-year deal. On 16 January 2023, following a successful World Cup with Australia, Rowles signed a five-year contract extension to 2028.

=== D.C. United ===
On 15 January 2025, Rowles joined Major League Soccer outfit D.C. United for an undisclosed fee on a two-year deal, with an option of another year.

== International career ==
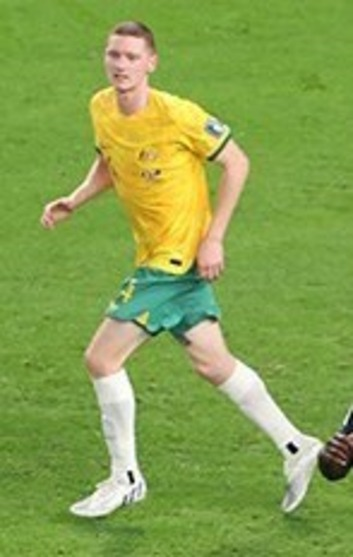
Rowles playing for Australia in the 2022 FIFA World Cup.

Rowles was selected in the Australian under-17 team for the 2015 FIFA U-17 World Cup.

In November 2020, Rowles was called up to the Australian under-23 team for friendly matches against A-League sides. In June 2021, Rowles was called up to the team again for the Tokyo 2020 Olympics. He was part of the Olyroos Olympic squad. The team beat Argentine in their first group match but were unable to win another match. They were therefore not in medal contention.

Rowles made his Socceroos debut 1 June 2022 against Jordan in a friendly match, winning 2–1.

Rowles was called up to the 2022 FIFA World Cup in Qatar.

== Career statistics ==
=== Club ===
As of 19 October 2025

Appearances and goals by club, season and competition
Club	Season	League			National cup (Note: Includes the FFA Cup and U.S. Open Cup)		Continental		Other		Total	
Club	Season	Division	Apps	Goals	Apps	Goals	Apps	Goals	Apps	Goals	Apps	Goals
Brisbane Roar	2016–17	A-League	2	0	0	0	2	0	0	0	4	0
Central Coast Mariners	2017–18	A-League	11	0	0	0	0	0	0	0	11	0
Central Coast Mariners	2018–19	A-League	21	1	1	0	0	0	0	0	22	1
Central Coast Mariners	2019–20	A-League	20	1	2	0	2	0	0	0	22	1
Central Coast Mariners	2020–21	A-League	27	0	0	0	0	0	0	0	27	0
Central Coast Mariners	2021–22	A-League	25	0	3	0	0	0	0	0	28	0
Central Coast Mariners	Total		104	2	6	0	2	0	0	0	112	2
Hearts	2022–23	Scottish Premiership	29	1	2	0	2	0	0	0	33	1
Hearts	2023–24	Scottish Premiership	33	0	6	0	4	0	0	0	43	0
Hearts	2024–25	Scottish Premiership	20	0	0	0	7	0	—		27	0
Hearts	Total		82	1	8	0	13	0	0	0	103	1
D.C. United	2025	Major League Soccer	31	0	3	0	—		0	0	34	0
Career total			219	3	17	0	17	0	0	0	253	3

=== International ===
As of match played 31 March 2026

Appearances and goals by national team and year
National team	Year	Apps	Goals
Australia	2022	7	0
Australia	2023	6	0
Australia	2024	11	1
Australia	2025	4	0
Australia	2026	1	0
Total		29	1

==== International goals ====
No.	Date	Venue	Opponent	Score	Result	Competition
1	21 March 2024	Western Sydney Stadium, Parramatta, Australia	Lebanon	2–0	2–0	2026 FIFA World Cup qualification

== Honours ==
Australia U20

- AFF U-19 Youth Championship: 2016

Individual

- Mariners Medal: 2020–21, 2021–22
- Mark Viduka Medal: 2021
- A-Leagues All Star: 2022
