= Jem Karacan =

English-Turkish footballer (born 1989)

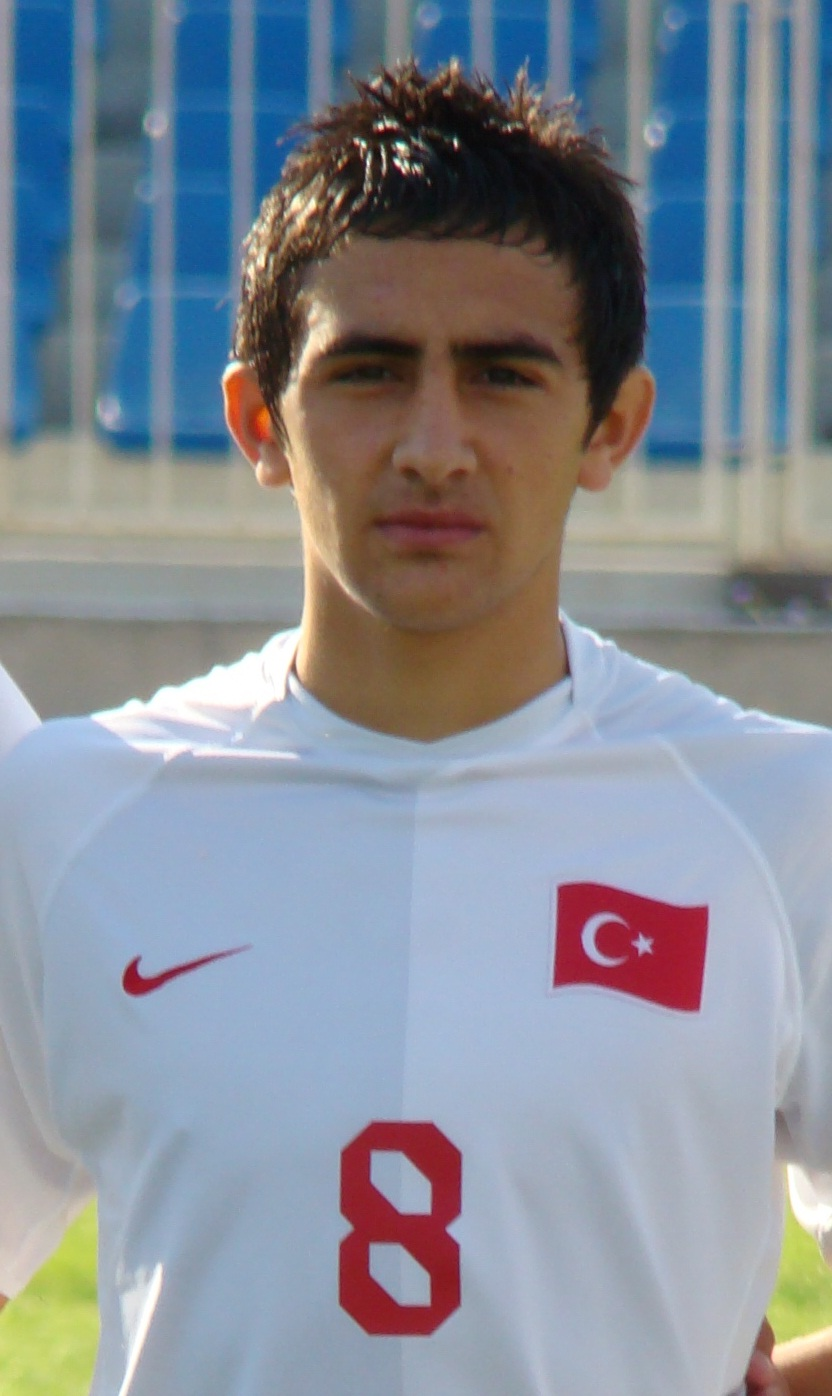
- Karacan in 2010

Personal information
- Full name: Jem Paul Karacan
- Date of birth: 21 February 1989 (age 37)
- Place of birth: Catford, London, England
- Positions: Central midfielder; defensive midfielder

Youth career
- 1996–2003: Wimbledon
- 2003–2007: Reading

Senior career*
Years	Team	Apps	(Gls)
2007–2015	Reading	155	(11)
2007–2008	→ AFC Bournemouth (loan)	13	(1)
2008	→ Millwall (loan)	7	(0)
2015–2017	Galatasaray	11	(1)
2016	→ Bursaspor (loan)	9	(0)
2017–2018	Bolton Wanderers	21	(1)
2018–2019	Millwall	4	(0)
2019	Central Coast Mariners	10	(1)
2021	Scunthorpe United	24	(0)
2022–2023	Radcliffe	15	(2)
Total		258	(16)

International career^{‡}
2006	Turkey U17	5	(0)
2006	Turkey U18	6	(2)
2006–2008	Turkey U19	10	(0)
2008–2011	Turkey U21	3	(0)
2012	Turkey A2	1	(0)
- * Club domestic league appearances and goals as of 15:51, 23 January 2023 (UTC) ‡ National team caps and goals as of 14 October 2012

Jem Paul Karacan (born 21 February 1989) is a former professional footballer who played as a midfielder. Currently a licensed football agent, Karacan spent the majority of his playing career with Reading, whilst also playing for AFC Bournemouth, Millwall, Galatasaray, Bursaspor, Bolton Wanderers, Central Coast Mariners, Scunthorpe United and Radcliffe. Internationally He played for the Turkish youth team, and has captained the U-21 side.

== Early life ==
Karacan was born in Catford, London to a Turkish father and an English mother. Between the ages of seven and fourteen he played for the now defunct Wimbledon and left after they relocated to Milton Keynes. He had been offered a four-year contract at the club his father supported, Galatasaray, but refused citing language difficulties, "I couldn't go out there at only 14, not speaking the language and so on". Karacan joined Reading's Youth Academy instead, having been spotted playing against the Royals while on trial at Manchester United.

== Club career ==
=== Reading ===
On 6 July 2007, he signed a two-year professional contract with Reading, and made his debut against Luton Town on 26 August in the League Cup, getting on the scoresheet.

==== Loan to AFC Bournemouth and Millwall ====
Karacan joined AFC Bournemouth on loan, initially for one month, on 18 October 2007. Karacan was put into the starting XI for Bournemouth on 20 October away to Millwall, where he made his league debut in Bournemouth's 2–1 defeat. His loan was subsequently extended to 6 January 2008. Karacan signed a further loan deal in the 2007–08 season on 20 March 2008, this time to Football League One side Millwall, which was originally due to run until 19 April 2008, but was extended to the end of the 2007–08 season.

==== Return to Reading ====
He scored against Aston Villa in a pre season match before the 2008–09 season, and scored his first professional goal for Reading in a League Cup win over Luton Town on 26 August 2008. Towards the end of 2008, he began to start a few matches after impressing in the reserves and following injuries to James Harper and Marek Matejovsky. He signed a new 2 and half-year contract in October 2008, keeping him at the club until the end of the 2010–11 season. He scored his first league goal in Reading's 2–2 draw with Blackpool F.C. on 13 April 2009, in the Championship. On 20 August 2011, Karacan made his 100th appearance in all competitions for Reading against Barnsley in a 2–1 defeat. During Reading's 2–0 victory over Leeds United on 6 April, Karacan suffered a broken ankle after a tackle by Michael Brown. He signed a new contract on 19 September 2012 keeping him at the club until June 2015. On 4 May 2013 Karacan scored his first Premier League goal with a low shot into the bottom corner in Reading's 4–2 away win against Fulham.

He began the 2013–14 season in good goalscoring form, netting twice in a 3–3 draw against Watford on 17 August. A month later he again suffered a serious injury in a game against Leeds and had to be substituted after nine minutes. The club later confirmed that he had ruptured both his anterior cruciate and medial ligaments and would be out for six to nine months. After more than a year out, he entered the final part of his recovery in October 2014.

For the 2014–15 season, Karacan was made captain by Nigel Adkins and changed his squad number to 21, due to his admiration for Italian maestro Andrea Pirlo. He made a brief return from his injury nightmare on 10 January 2015, coming on as a late substitute against Middlesbrough. He scored a consolation goal from 20 yards on 14 March, after replacing Jake Taylor as a second-half substitute in a 4–1 defeat at Vicarage Road, in his second appearance of the season.

He went on to play in each of the remaining games and made his final appearance in a Reading FC shirt in a 3–0 away victory against Derby County.

=== Galatasaray ===
On 8 July 2015, Karacan joined Galatasaray on a three-year contract following the expiration of his Reading contract at the end of the 2014–15 season.

Karacan made his debut for the club in a 1–0 victory against Bursaspor in the Super Cup final, replacing Lukas Podolski in the final 10 minutes of the game.

He made his Süper Lig debut against Gaziantepspor after replacing Yasin Öztekin, and Galatasaray won that match 2–1. Karacan played 90 minutes against Eskişehirspor where his team won 4–0, showing himself as a central midfielder both offensively and defensively.

Karacan made his Champions League debut on 25 November 2015 completing 90 minutes away to Atlético Madrid in a 2–0 defeat.

He scored his first goal for the club in a 4–0 win against Kastamonuspor in the Turkish Cup on 26 January 2016. This was his last appearance before leaving to join Bursaspor for the remainder of the season.

Karacan left Galatasaray by mutual consent on 6 January 2017.

==== Loan to Bursaspor ====
On 1 February 2016, Karacan was loaned to fellow Süper Lig club Bursaspor until the end of the 2015–16.

He played 10 games whilst on loan at Bursaspor playing mainly as a central midfielder but showing versatility by playing his final game for the club appearing as right back and getting man of the match in a 1–1 draw with Konyaspor.

Bursaspor enquired about the permanent signing of Karacan but according to reports the financial situation at the club meant negotiations broke down.

=== Bolton Wanderers ===
On 11 March 2017, Karacan joined Bolton Wanderers on a one-month contract, making his debut for the Trotters from the substitutes bench that same day, coming on for Darren Pratley in a 4–2 win away at Fleetwood Town. On the final day of the season, Karacan scored the opening goal to put Bolton 1-0 up against Peterborough United in a 3–0 win, which was enough to seal promotion back to Championship as runners up. On 24 May, the club confirmed that Karacan had signed a one-year deal, with an option for a further year, keeping him at the club until at least June 2018. Parkinson made Karacan captain for several games during the first third of the season and then due to unknown circumstances he was out of favour. On 23 May 2018, Karacan confirmed that the option on his contract was not activated and was leaving Bolton Wanderers at the end of his contract in June 2018. The day after, Bolton confirmed that Karacan would leave the club at the end of his contract.

=== Millwall ===
On 17 August 2018, Millwall announced the signing of Karacan on a short-term deal until January 2019. Karacan left Millwall at the end of his contract on 15 January 2019.

=== Central Coast Mariners ===
On 24 January 2019, Central Coast Mariners announced the signing of Karacan on a contract until the end of the 2018–19 season.

=== Scunthorpe United ===
Karacan joined League Two club Scunthorpe United on a short-term deal on 4 January 2021. At the end of the 2020–21 season, after helping Scunthorpe United avoid relegation and playing 24 times, Karacan left the club with the expiration of his contract. He was one of 17 players released by Scunthorpe at the end of the 2020–21 season.

=== Radcliffe ===
On 2 July 2022, Radcliffe announced the signing of Karacan.

=== Retirement ===
On 23 January 2023, Karacan announced his retirement from football.

== International career ==
Born to a Turkish father and English mother, Karacan is eligible to represent both countries at international level. He chose to represent Turkey and has captained them at youth level. He made his debut for the under-21s as a substitute against Armenia in August 2008, before making his first appearance for the A2 team when they beat Estonia 5–0 in March 2012. Karacan received his first senior call-up for Turkey on 13 October 2012, for the 2014 FIFA World Cup qualification match against Hungary, but was an unused substitute.

== Career statistics ==
As of match played 26 December 2022.

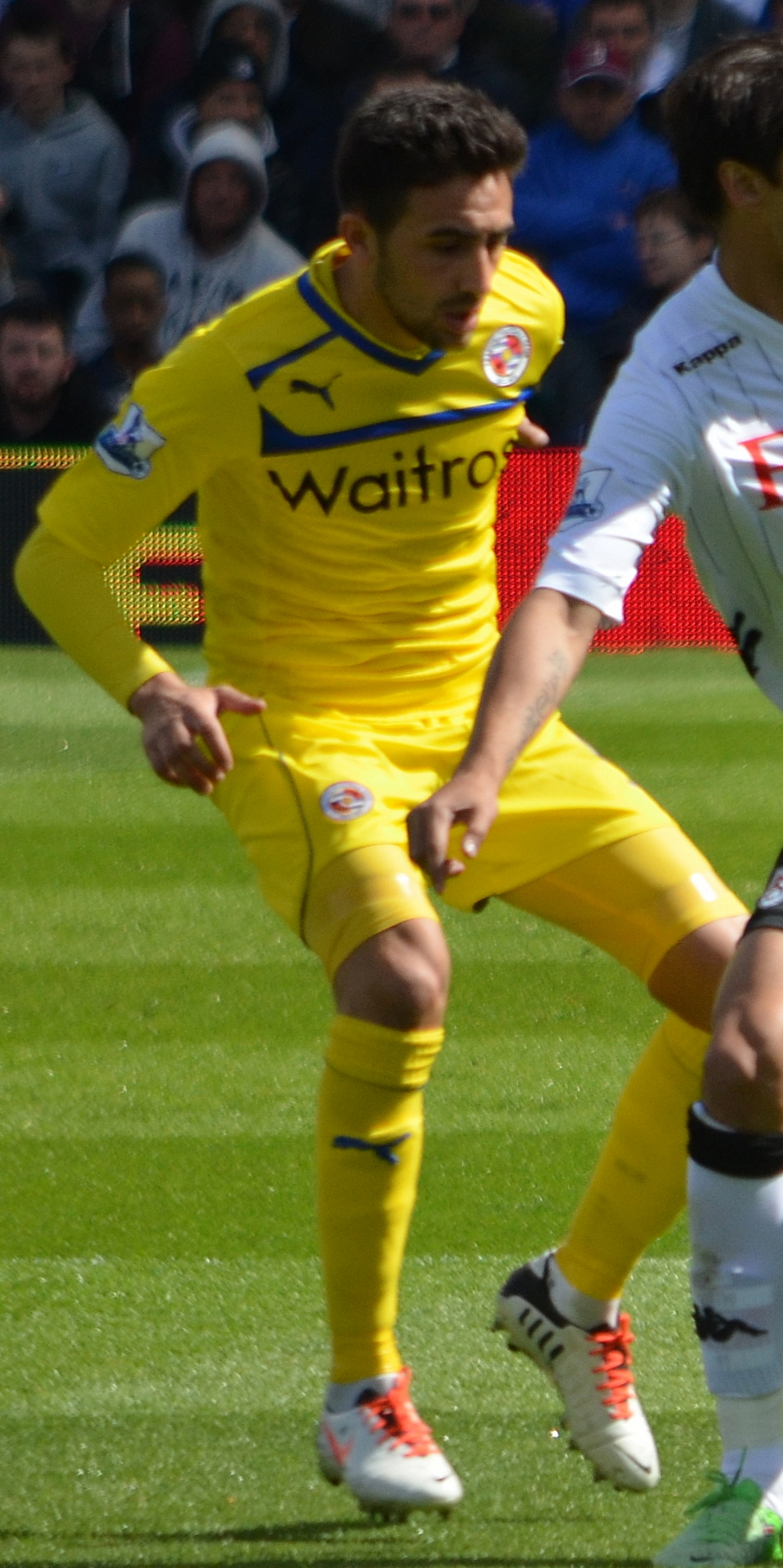
Karacan playing for Reading in 2013

Appearances and goals by club, season and competition
Club	Season	League			National Cup		League Cup		Continental		Other		Total	
Club	Season	Division	Apps	Goals	Apps	Goals	Apps	Goals	Apps	Goals	Apps	Goals	Apps	Goals
Reading	2007–08	Premier League	0	0	0	0	0	0	—		—		0	0
Reading	2008–09	Championship	15	1	1	0	1	1	—		0	0	17	2
Reading	2009–10	Championship	27	0	4	0	0	0	—		—		31	0
Reading	2010–11	Championship	40	3	3	0	2	0	—		3 (Note: Appearances in the Championship play-offs)	0	48	3
Reading	2011–12	Championship	37	3	0	0	0	0	—		—		37	3
Reading	2012–13	Premier League	21	1	3	0	2	0	—		—		26	1
Reading	2013–14	Championship	7	2	0	0	0	0	—		0	0	7	2
Reading	2014–15	Championship	8	1	1	0	0	0	—		0	0	9	1
Reading	Total		155	11	12	0	5	1	-	-	3	0	175	12
AFC Bournemouth (loan)	2007–08	League One	13	1	3	1	0	0	–		1 (Note: Appearance in the EFL Trophy)	0	17	2
Millwall (loan)	2007–08	League One	7	0	0	0	0	0	–		0	0	7	0
Galatasaray	2015–16	Süper Lig	2	0	2	0	-		1 (Note: Appearance in the UEFA Champions League)	0	1 (Note: Appearance in the Turkish Super Cup)	0	6	0
Galatasaray	2016–17	Süper Lig	0	0	0	0	-		0	0	0	0	0	0
Galatasaray	Total		2	0	2	0	-	-	1	0	1	0	6	0
Bursaspor (loan)	2015–16	Süper Lig	9	0	0	0	–		–		–		9	0
Bolton Wanderers	2016–17	League One	5	1	0	0	0	0	-		-		5	1
Bolton Wanderers	2017–18	Championship	16	0	0	0	2	1	-		-		18	1
Bolton Wanderers	Total		21	1	0	0	2	1	-	-	-	-	23	2
Millwall	2018–19	Championship	4	0	0	0	2	0	–		–		6	0
Central Coast Mariners	2018–19	A-League	8	1	0	0	–		–		–		8	1
Scunthorpe United	2020–21	League Two	24	0	0	0	0	0	–		0	0	24	0
Radcliffe	2022–23	Northern Premier League	15	2	0	0	–		–		0	0	15	2
Career total			258	16	17	1	9	2	1	0	5	0	290	19

== Honours ==
Reading

- Football League Championship: 2011–12

Galatasaray

- Turkish Super Cup: 2015
