= Stephen Mallon =

Irish association football player (born 1999)

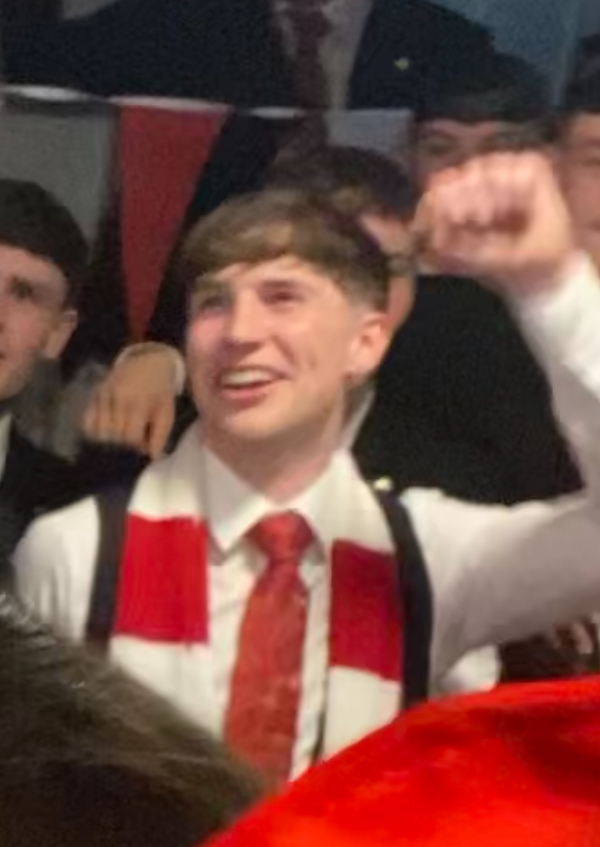
- Mallon in 2024

Personal information
- Full name: Stephen Anthony Mallon
- Date of birth: 7 February 1999 (age 27)
- Place of birth: Belfast, Northern Ireland
- Position: Winger

Team information
- Current team: Glenavon
- Number: 11

Youth career
- St Oliver Plunkett FC 1969
- 2013–2019: Sheffield United

Senior career*
Years	Team	Apps	(Gls)
2019–2020	Sheffield United	0	(0)
2019	→ Central Coast Mariners (loan)	8	(1)
2020	→ Derry City (loan)	14	(2)
2021–2022	Bohemians	15	(1)
2022–2024	Cliftonville	24	(2)
2024–2025	Sligo Rovers	20	(0)
2025–	Glenavon	19	(0)

International career^{‡}
2014	Northern Ireland U15	4	(0)
2016	Republic of Ireland U18	5	(1)
2018	Republic of Ireland U19	1	(0)
2019	Republic of Ireland U21	2	(0)
- * Club domestic league appearances and goals as of 29 April 2026 ‡ National team caps and goals as of 00:06, 10 October 2024 (UTC)

Stephen Anthony Mallon (born 7 February 1999) is an Irish professional footballer who plays as a winger for NIFL Premiership club Glenavon.

== Club career ==
Born in Belfast, Northern Ireland, Mallon started his football career at St Oliver Plunkett FC 1969 before he moved to Sheffield United.

Mallon progressed the club's youth system, first starting out with the U18 side. By March 2016, he progressed to playing for the U21 side. By November 2016, Mallon progressed to playing for the U23 side.

Following his loan spell at Central Coast Mariners came to an end, Mallon resumed playing for Sheffield United's U23 side.

=== Loan spells from Sheffield United ===
Mallon joined A-League side Central Coast Mariners on loan from Sheffield United in January 2019. He made his debut for the club, coming on as a 69th-minute substitute, in a 2–0 loss against Western Sydney Wanderers on 9 February 2019. In a follow–up match, Mallon started the match in the left wing-back and helped Central Coast Mariners drew 1–1 against third-placed Sydney to move five points adrift at the foot of the table. He then scored his first goal for the club, in a 8–2 loss against Wellington Phoenix on 9 March 2019. Mallon went on to make eight appearances and scoring once in all competitions.

On 10 January 2020, Mallon signed for League of Ireland Premier Division side Derry City on loan. He made his league debut, coming on as a late substitute, in a 1–0 loss against Dundalk in the opening game of the season. Fallon then scored his first league goal against Bohemians at the Ryan McBride Brandywell Stadium, winning 2–0 on 28 February 2020. One week after his first goal for the club, on Friday 6 March he scored again, losing 2–1 against Waterford away at the RSC. Once the season resumed due to the COVID-19 pandemic, his loan was extended until the end of the League of Ireland Premier Division season in July. On 29 August 2020, Mallon scored his third goal for the club, in a 2–0 win against Drogheda United in the second round of the FAI Cup. Since the start of the 2020 season, he was a first team regular for Derry City. Mallon returned to Sheffield United after making 17 appearances and scoring 3 goals in all competitions for Derry City.

=== Bohemians ===
On 12 January 2021, Mallon departed Sheffield United, joining League of Ireland Premier Division side Bohemians on a permanent basis. He rejected a move return to Derry City, stating that "the team's 'style of play' simply didn't suit him."

However, Mallon missed the start of the season when he suffered a metatarsal injury. Mallon made his debut for the club, coming on as a 78th-minute substitute, in a 3–0 win against Waterford on 29 May 2021. However, his return was short–lived when he suffered another injury that kept him out for three weeks. Mallon made his return from injury, coming on as an 80th-minute substitute, in a 1–0 win against Sligo Rovers on 15 August 2021. However, his return was short–lived when he suffered another injury that kept him out for three months. On 12 November 2021, Mallon returned from injury, coming on as an 80th-minute substitute, in a 3–1 win against Shamrock Rovers. On 28 November 2021, he came on as a 86th-minute substitute for Bohemians in the 2021 FAI Cup Final against St Patrick's Athletic in front of a record FAI Cup Final crowd of 37,126 at the Aviva Stadium and then successfully converted the penalty on penalties following a 1–1 draw after extra time, as the club went on to lose 4–3. At the end of the 2021 season, Mallon went on to make seven appearances in all competitions.

The start of the 2022 season saw Mallon score his first goal for Bohemians, in a 1–0 win against St Patrick's Athletic. However, he continued to be plagued with injuries throughout his second season at the club.

=== Cliftonville ===
On 2 July 2022, Mallon returned to Northern Ireland to sign for NIFL Premiership side Cliftonville.

He played in both leg for the club's UEFA Conference League matches against Dunajská Streda, as Cliftonville lost 5–1 on aggregate. However, during the match against Ballymena United, Mallon suffered an injury and was substituted in the 53rd minute, as the club won 2–1. After the match, it was revealed that he suffered a muscle injury that required him to have a surgery. Following a surgery, it was announced that Mallon would be out for the rest of the 2022–23 season. At the end of the 2022–23 season, he went on to make three appearances in all competitions.

The start of the 2023–24 season saw Mallon continuing to recover from his muscle injury. On 30 September 2023, he made his return from injury, coming on as a 77th-minute substitute, in a 1–1 draw against Loughgall. In a follow–up match, Mallon scored his first goal for Cliftonville, in a 3–0 win against Institute in the Irish League Cup. Following his return from injury, he regained his first team place for the club. Mallon then scored his second goal for Cliftonville, and set up one of the goals, in a 3–0 win against Carrick Rangers on 19 November 2023. His third goal for the club came on 20 April 2024 against Glentoran, winning 2–0. Mallon came on as a 72nd-minute substitute in the Irish Cup final against Linfield and helped Cliftonville win 3–1 to end their 45 years drought. At the end of the 2023–24 season, he went on to make twenty–seven appearances and scoring three times in all competitions. Following this, Mallon left the club.

=== Sligo Rovers ===
Mallon signed for League of Ireland Premier Division club Sligo Rovers on 4 June 2024, with his contract due to begin from 1 July. He made his debut for the club in a 2–1 win against Derry City on 4 July 2024. In a follow–up match, Mallon was sent–off for a second bookable offence, in a 2–0 win against Bohemians. After serving a one match ban, he returned to the starting line–up, in a 3–2 loss against St Patrick's Athletic on 4 July 2024. However, his return was short–lived when Mallon suffered an injury that saw him out for one match. After just 8 appearances for the club, he suffered a hip injury in a 4–0 loss away to Shamrock Rovers on 13 September 2024 that would rule him out for the rest of the season. On 2 July 2025, it was announced that Mallon had left the club by mutual consent.

=== Glenavon ===
On 3 July 2025, it was announced that Mallon had signed for NIFL Premiership club Glenavon on a multi-year contract. He made his debut in a 2-0 defeat to Ballymena United.

== International career ==
Mallon represented Northern Ireland at youth level, starting out with Northern Ireland U15 where he played four times. Mallon was then called up for the Northern Ireland U16 in April 2015.

Mallon then switched allegiances to play for the Republic of Ireland's youth teams, starting with the Republic of Ireland U17. He made his debut for the U17 side, starting a match, in a 1–0 win against Finland U17 on 24 September 2015. Mallon then scored his goal for Republic of Ireland U17, in a 3–0 win against Montenegro U17 on 30 March 2016. He came on as a 64th-minute substitute, as the U17 side went on to lose 4–3 on penalties against Poland U17 following a 0–0 draw. Mallon went on to make six appearances and scoring once for Republic of Ireland U17.

In November 2016, Mallon was called up to the Republic of Ireland U18 squad. He made his debut for the U18 side, starting the whole game, in a 0–0 draw against Netherlands U18 on 11 November 2016. Mallon went on to make two appearances for Republic of Ireland U18. In March 2017, he was called up to the Republic of Ireland U19 for the first time. Mallon had to wait until on 24 March 2018 to make his debut for the U19 side, starting the match, in a 3–0 win against Kosovo U19.

In March 2019, Mallon was called up to the Republic of Ireland U21 for the first time, but he appeared as an unused substitute. Two months later, Mallon was called up to the squad for the Toulon Tournament. He made his debut for the U21 squad, starting the match, in a 2–0 loss against Brazil U23 on 12 June 2019 in the semi–finals of the Toulon Tournament. Mallon made his second appearance for the Republic of Ireland U21 against Mexico U23 in the third place playoff, as the U21 loss 4–3 on penalties. In September 2020, he announced his intention to switch allegiances back to Northern Ireland.

== Career statistics ==
As of match played 30 December 2025

Appearances and goals by club, season and competition
Club	Season	League			National cup (Note: Includes FA Cup, Australia Cup, FAI Cup & Irish Cup)		League cup (Note: Includes EFL Cup & Irish League Cup)		Continental		Other		Total	
Club	Season	Division	Apps	Goals	Apps	Goals	Apps	Goals	Apps	Goals	Apps	Goals	Apps	Goals
Sheffield United	2018-19	Championship	0	0	0	0	0	0	—		—		0	0
Sheffield United	2019-20	Premier League	0	0	0	0	0	0	—		—		0	0
Sheffield United	Total		0	0	0	0	0	0	—		—		0	0
Central Coast Mariners (loan)	2018-19	A-League	8	1	0	0	—		—		—		8	1
Derry City (loan)	2020	LOI Premier Division	14	2	2	1	—		1 (Note: Appearance(s) in UEFA Europa League)	0	—		17	3
Bohemians	2021	LOI Premier Division	5	0	1	0	—		1 (Note: Appearance(s) in UEFA Europa Conference League)	0	—		7	0
Bohemians	2022	LOI Premier Division	10	1	0	0	—		—		—		10	1
Bohemians	Total		15	1	1	0	—		1	0	—		17	1
Cliftonville	2022-23	NIFL Premiership	3	0	0	0	0	0	2	0	0	0	5	0
Cliftonville	2023-24	NIFL Premiership	21	2	4	0	1	0	—		—		26	2
Cliftonville	Total		24	2	4	0	1	0	2	0	0	0	31	2
Sligo Rovers	2024	LOI Premier Division	6	0	2	0	—		—		—		8	0
Sligo Rovers	2025	LOI Premier Division	14	0	—		—		—		—		14	0
Sligo Rovers	Total		20	0	2	0	—		—		—		22	0
Glenavon	2025-26	NIFL Premiership	10	0	0	0	1	0	—		1	0	12	0
Career total			91	6	9	1	2	0	4	0	1	0	107	7

== Honours ==
Bohemians

- FAI Cup runner-up: 2021

Cliftonville

- Irish Cup: 2023–24
