= Peter Kekeris =

Australian soccer player

Personal information
- Full name: Peter Kekeris
- Date of birth: 7 May 1999 (age 27)
- Place of birth: Australia
- Position: Winger

Team information
- Current team: Blacktown Spartans
- Number: 99

Youth career
- 2013–2015: FNSW NTC
- 2016: Western Sydney Wanderers
- 2016–2019: Central Coast Mariners

Senior career*
Years	Team	Apps	(Gls)
2014–2015	FFA CoE	22	(3)
2016–2019	CCM Academy	53	(9)
2018–2019	Central Coast Mariners	6	(0)
2019–2021	Sydney Olympic	33	(2)
2021	APIA Leichhardt	8	(3)
2022–2023	Rockdale Ilinden	37	(1)
2023	North West Sydney Spirit	10	(1)
2024–2025	Manly United	43	(6)
2025	St George City	9	(0)
2026	Bankstown City	20	(2)
2026–	Blacktown Spartans	1	(0)

International career^{‡}
2016	Australia U17	7	(0)
- * Club domestic league appearances and goals as of 27 June 2026 ‡ National team caps and goals as of 7 April 2018

Peter Kekeris (born 7 May 1999) is an Australian professional soccer player who plays as a winger for Blacktown Spartans in NSW League One.

== International career ==
Kekeris was born in Australia and is of Greek descent. Despite being one of the youngest players in his then National team, he played for Australia U-17s on 7 occasions.
