= Jaden Casella =

Australian soccer player

- Casella playing for Central Coast Mariners in 2020

Personal information
- Date of birth: 10 March 2000 (age 26)
- Place of birth: Sydney, Australia
- Position: Winger

Team information
- Current team: St George FC

Youth career
- Sutherland Sharks

Senior career*
Years	Team	Apps	(Gls)
2020	Rockdale City Suns	11	(4)
2020–2021	Central Coast Mariners	20	(1)
2021	CCM Academy	1	(0)
2022–2024	Rockdale Ilinden	49	(14)
2024	Sydney Olympic	10	(1)
2024–2026	St George FC	62	(19)
2026–	Sutherland Sharks	0	(0)
- * Club domestic league appearances and goals as of 17 September 2026

Jaden Casella (born 10 March 2000) is an Australian professional footballer who plays as a winger for Sutherland Sharks in the Australian Championship and NPL NSW.

== Club career ==
On 18 December 2020, Casella signed his first professional contract with the Central Coast Mariners after a season with Rockdale City Suns where he featured in the NPL NSW Grand Final. He later returned to Rockdale after playing two years with the Mariners' senior and NPL squads.
