= Stefan Janković (footballer) =

Serbian footballer

Personal information
- Full name: Stefan Janković
- Date of birth: 11 November 1997 (age 28)
- Place of birth: Leskovac, FR Yugoslavia
- Height: 1.76 m (5 ft 9 1/2 in)
- Position: Central midfielder

Team information
- Current team: Żebbuġ Rangers

Youth career
- 2006–2013: Partizan
- 2013–: OFK Beograd

Senior career*
Years	Team	Apps	(Gls)
2014–2016	OFK Beograd	19	(0)
2016–2017	BSK Borča	2	(0)
2017–2018	Borac Čačak	1	(0)
2019–2020	OFK Beograd	28	(6)
2020–2021	Central Coast Mariners	1	(0)
2021–2022	Pembroke Athleta	20	(9)
2022–	Żebbuġ Rangers	19	(0)

International career
2013	Serbia U16	3	(0)
2013–2014	Serbia U17	11	(1)
2014–2015	Serbia U18	15	(3)
2015–2016	Serbia U19	7	(0)
- * Club domestic league appearances and goals as of 16 April 2023

Stefan Janković (Serbian Cyrillic: Стефан Јанковић; born 11 November 1997) is a Serbian professional footballer who plays as a midfielder for Maltese club Żebbuġ Rangers.

== Club career ==
=== OFK Beograd ===
Janković initially played in Partizan's youth system, but ultimately joined OFK Beograd along with former Partizan teammates Dejan Dražić, Milan Savić, Nemanja Belaković, and Nikola Aksentijević. On 25 May 2014, he made his professional debut with OFK Beograd under coach Zlatko Krmpotić in a 4–2 loss against Red Star Belgrade. On 11 January 2019, Janković returned to OFK Beograd after two years.

=== Central Coast Mariners ===
Stefan signed with Australian A-League side Central Coast Mariners in December 2020. His first and only competitive appearance for the Mariners came as a late substitute in a 3–2 win over Melbourne City in the 2020–21 A-League on 3 February 2021.

=== Pembroke Athleta ===
In September 2021, Janković signed for Maltese Challenge League side Pembroke Athleta. He made his debut for the side in their opening game of the 2021–22 Maltese Challenge League against Vittoriosa Stars. He scored his first goal for the side in their next league game, a win over Melita.
